= List of birds of Italy =

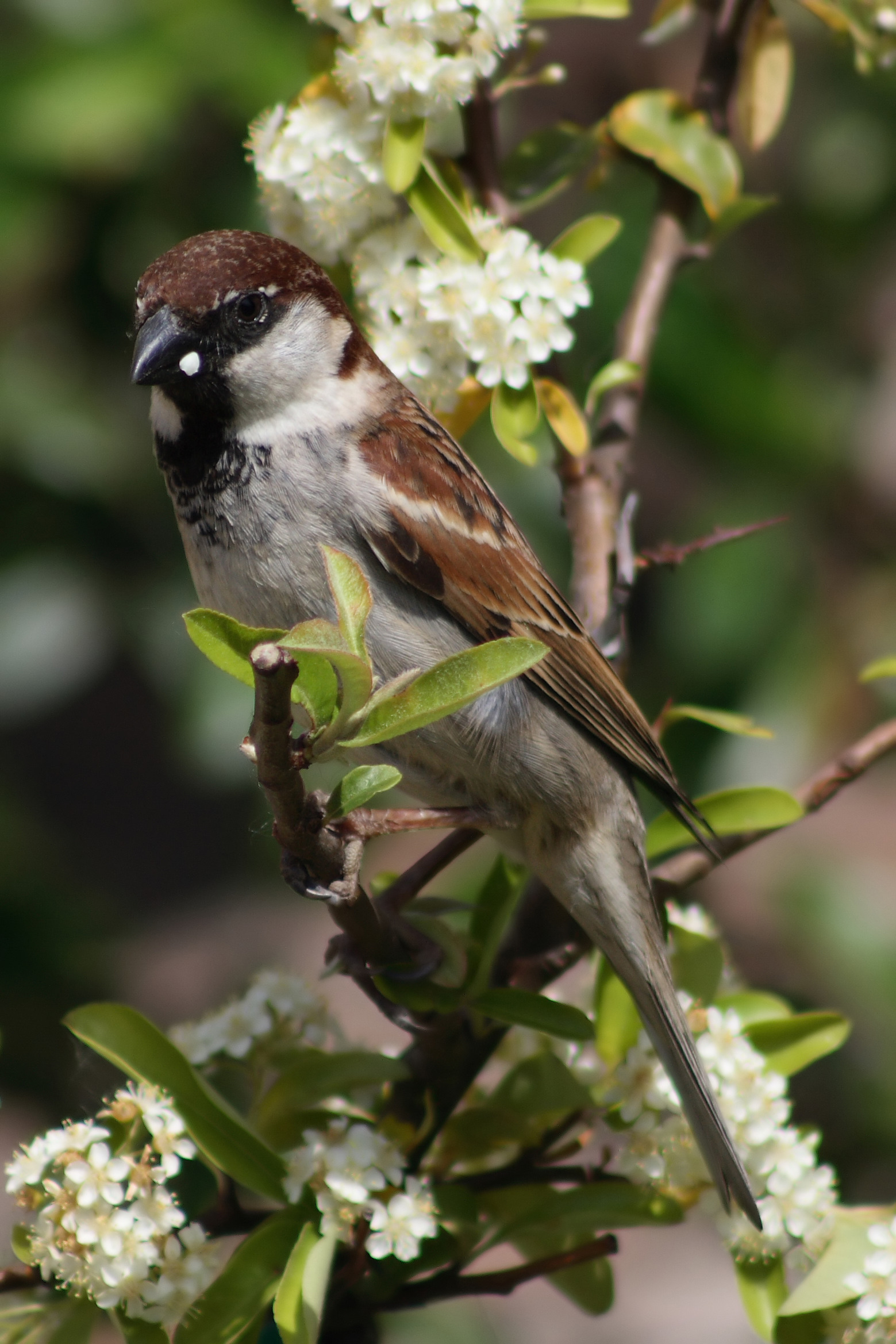
The Italian sparrow is the national bird of Italy.

This is a list of the bird species recorded in Italy. This list's taxonomic treatment (designation and sequence of orders, families and species) and nomenclature (English, scientific, and Italian names) follow those of the Handbook of the Birds of the World & BirdLife International Checklist. The Italian sparrow is unofficially considered the national bird of Italy.

Bird species admitted to the Italian List are included in the following categories A, B or C, with the same definitions as the British and other Western Palaearctic bird lists:

- A: species that have been recorded in an apparently natural state at least once since 1 January 1950.
- B: species that were recorded in an apparently natural state at least once between 1 January 1800 and 31 December 1949, but have not been recorded subsequently.
- C: species introduced by humans, and have established breeding populations derived from introduced stock, which maintain themselves without necessary recourse to further introduction.

== New World quail ==
Order: Galliformes Family: Odontophoridae

The Odontophoridae are a family of terrestrial birds. In general, they are plump and have broad, relatively short wings. One introduced species in Italy.

- Northern bobwhite Colinus virginianus Colino della Virginia – C

== Pheasants, grouse, and allies ==
Order: Galliformes Family: Phasianidae

The Phasianidae are a family of terrestrial birds. In general, they are plump (although they vary in size) and have broad, relatively short wings.

- Common quail Coturnix coturnix Quaglia – A
- Rock partridge Alectoris graeca Coturnice – AC
- Chukar partridge Alectoris chukar Coturnice orientale – C
- Barbary partridge Alectoris barbara Pernice sarda – C
- Red-legged partridge Alectoris rufa Pernice rossa – AC
- Erckel's francolin Pternistis erckelii Francolino di Erckel – C
- Black francolin Francolinus francolinus Francolino nero – C
- Common pheasant Phasianus colchicus Fagiano comune – C
- Grey partridge Perdix perdix Starna – AC
- Hazel grouse Tetrastes bonasia Francolino di monte – A
- Rock ptarmigan Lagopus muta Pernice bianca – A
- Western capercaillie Tetrao urogallus Gallo cedrone – A
- Black grouse Lyrurus tetrix Fagiano di monte – A
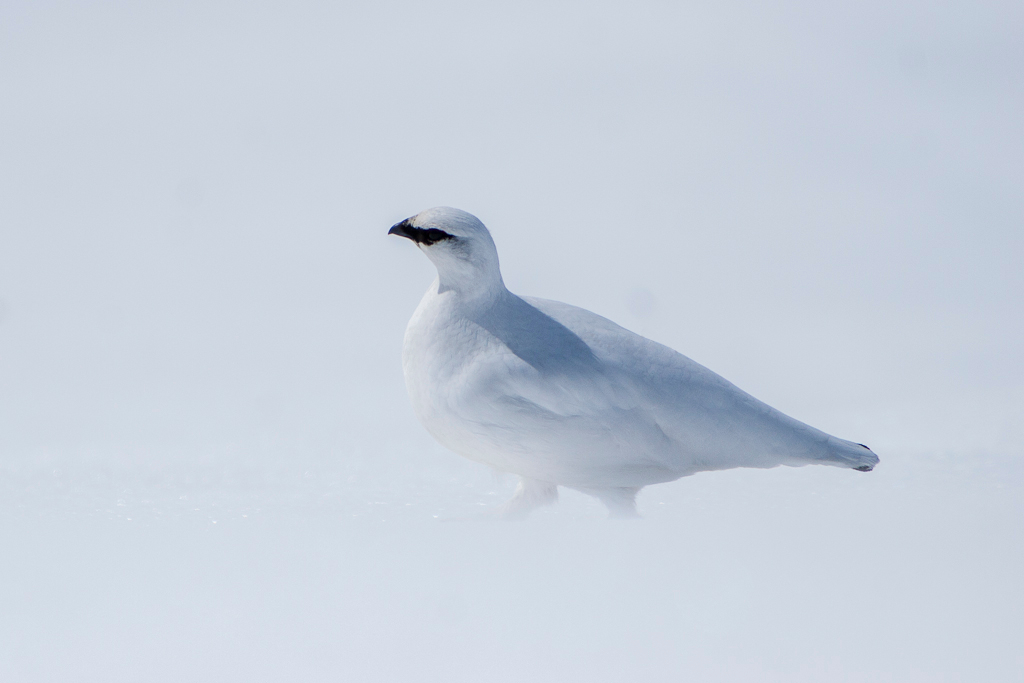
Rock ptarmigan, Stelvio National Park

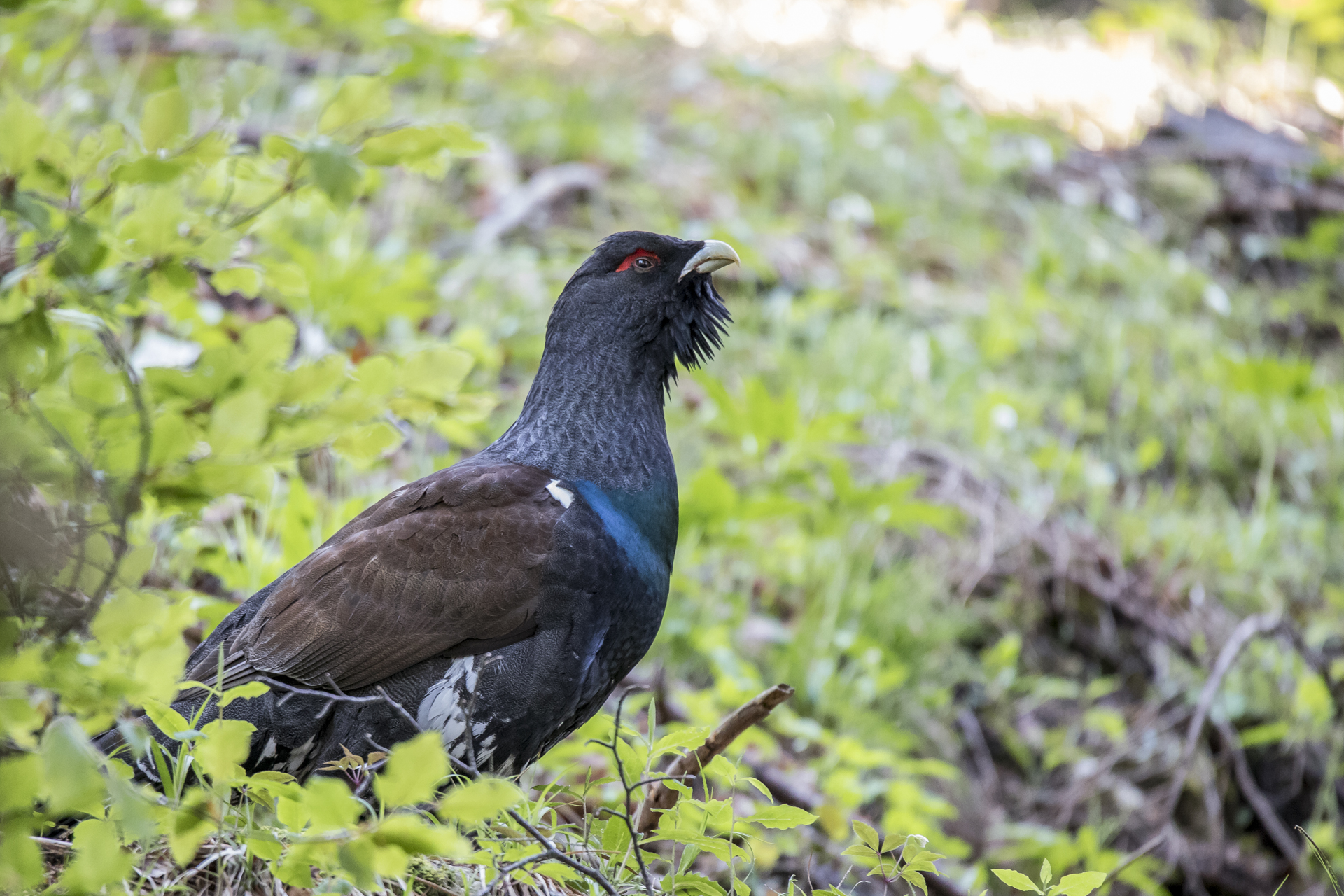
Western capercaillie, Belluno

== Ducks, geese, and waterfowl ==
Order: Anseriformes Family: Anatidae

Anatidae includes the ducks and most duck-like waterfowl, such as geese and swans. These birds are adapted to an aquatic existence with webbed feet, flattened bills, and feathers that are excellent at shedding water due to an oily coating.

- Ruddy duck Oxyura jamaicensis Gobbo della Giamaica – C
- White-headed duck Oxyura leucocephala Gobbo rugginoso – A
- Black swan Cygnus atratus Cigno nero – C
- Mute swan Cygnus olor Cigno reale – AC
- Whooper swan Cygnus cygnus Cigno selvatico – A
- Tundra swan Cygnus columbianus Cigno minore – A
- Brent goose Branta bernicla Oca colombaccio – A
- Barnacle goose Branta leucopsis Oca facciabianca – AC
- Red-breasted goose Branta ruficollis Oca collorosso – A
- Canada goose Branta canadensis Oca del Canada – C
- Snow goose Anser caerulescens Oca delle nevi – A
- Greylag goose Anser anser Oca selvatica – AC
- Bean goose Anser fabalis Oca granaiola – A
- Pink-footed goose Anser brachyrhynchus Oca zamperosee – A
- Greater white-fronted goose Anser albifrons Oca lombardella – A
- Lesser white-fronted goose Anser erythropus Oca lombardella minore – A
- Long-tailed duck Clangula hyemalis Moretta codona – A
- King eider Somateria spectabilis Re degli edredoni – A
- Common eider Somateria mollissima Edredone – A
- Velvet scoter Melanitta fusca Orco marino – A
- Common scoter Melanitta nigra Orchetto marino – A
- Common goldeneye Bucephala clangula Quattrocchi – A
- Smew Mergellus albellus Pesciaiola – A
- Goosander Mergus merganser Smergo maggiore – A
- Red-breasted merganser Mergus serrator Smergo minore – A
- Harlequin duck Histrionicus histrionicus Moretta arlecchino – B
- Egyptian goose Alopochen aegyptiaca Oca egiziana – C
- Common shelduck Tadorna tadorna Volpoca – AC
- Ruddy shelduck Tadorna ferruginea Casarca – AC
- Mandarin duck Aix galericulata Anatra mandarina – C
- Marbled teal Marmaronetta angustirostris Anatra marmorizzata – A
- Red-crested pochard Netta rufina Fistione turco – A
- Common pochard Aythya ferina Moriglione – AC
- Ferruginous duck Aythya nyroca Moretta tabaccata – A
- Ring-necked duck Aythya collaris Moretta dal collare – A
- Tufted duck Aythya fuligula Moretta – A
- Greater scaup Aythya marila Moretta grigia – A
- Garganey Spatula querquedula Marzaiola – A
- Northern shoveler Spatula clypeata Mestolone – A
- Blue-winged teal Spatula discors Marzaiola americana – A
- Baikal teal Sibirionetta formosa Alzavola asiatica – A
- Gadwall Mareca strepera Canapiglia – A
- Eurasian wigeon Mareca penelope Fischione – A
- Mallard Anas platyrhynchos Germano reale – AC
- Northern pintail Anas acuta Codone – A
- Eurasian teal Anas crecca Alzavola – A
- Green-winged teal Anas carolinensis Alzavola americana – A
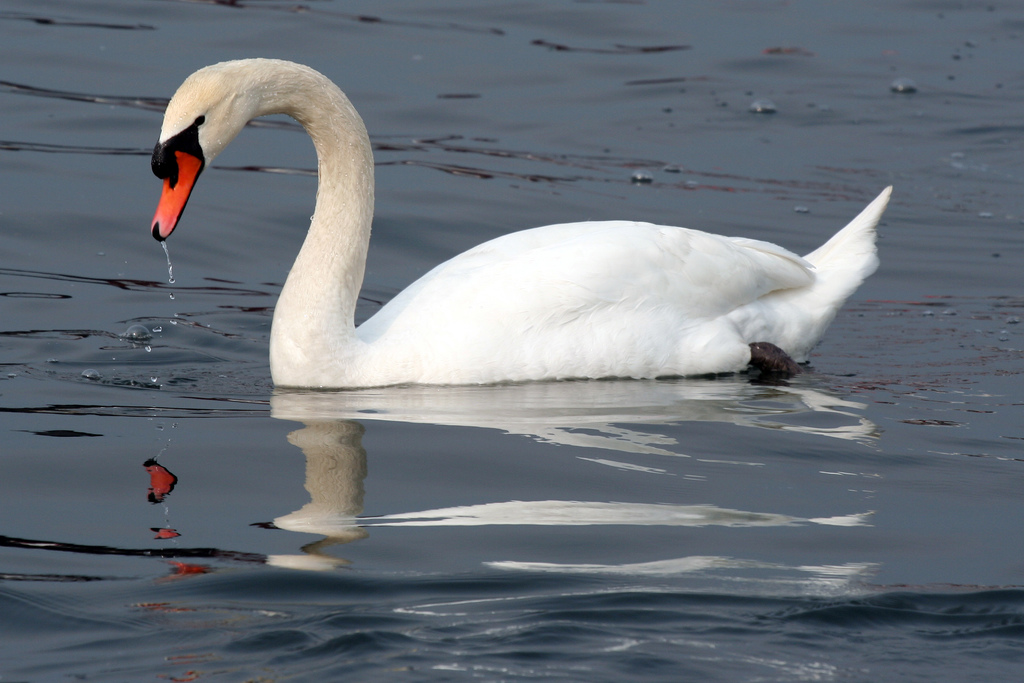
Mute swan, Lake Maggiore

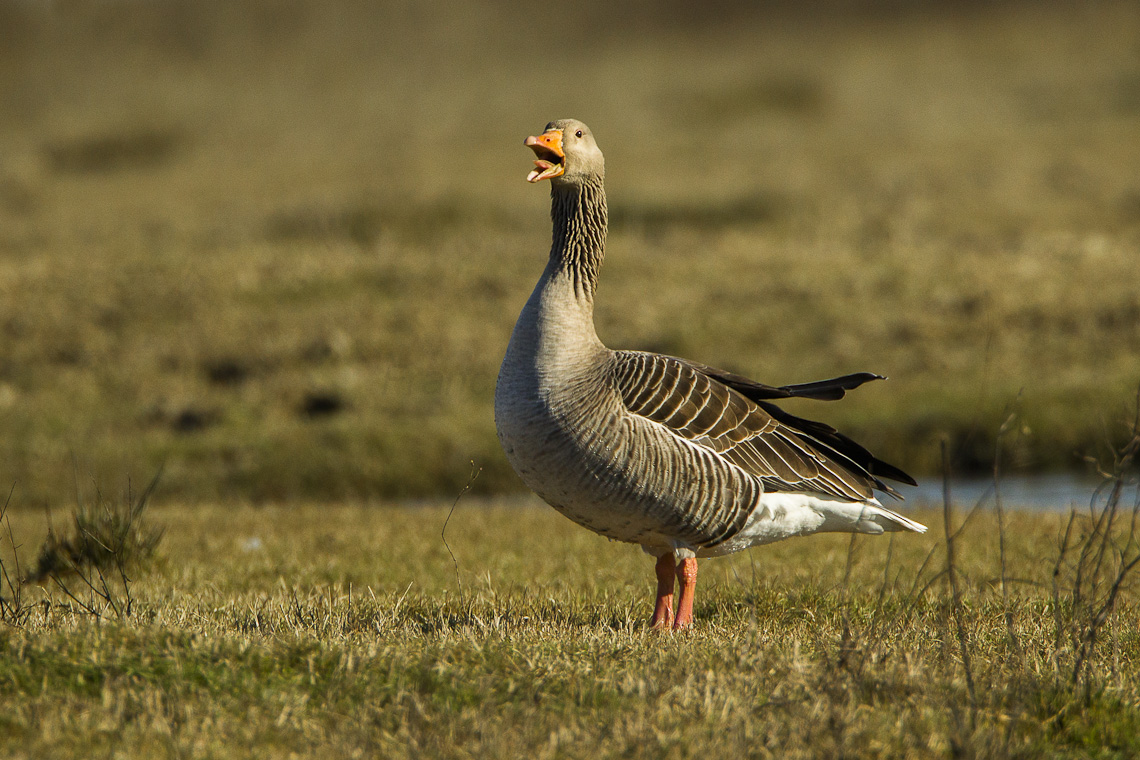
Greylag goose, Cona

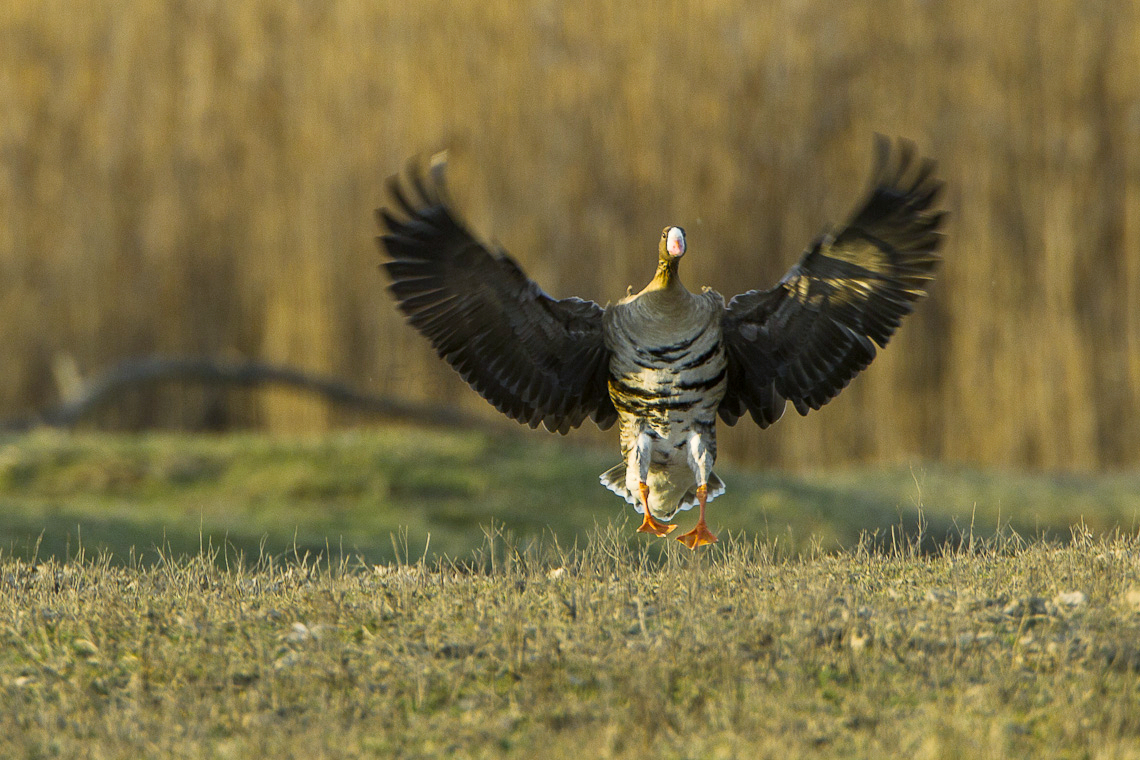
Greater white-fronted goose, Cona

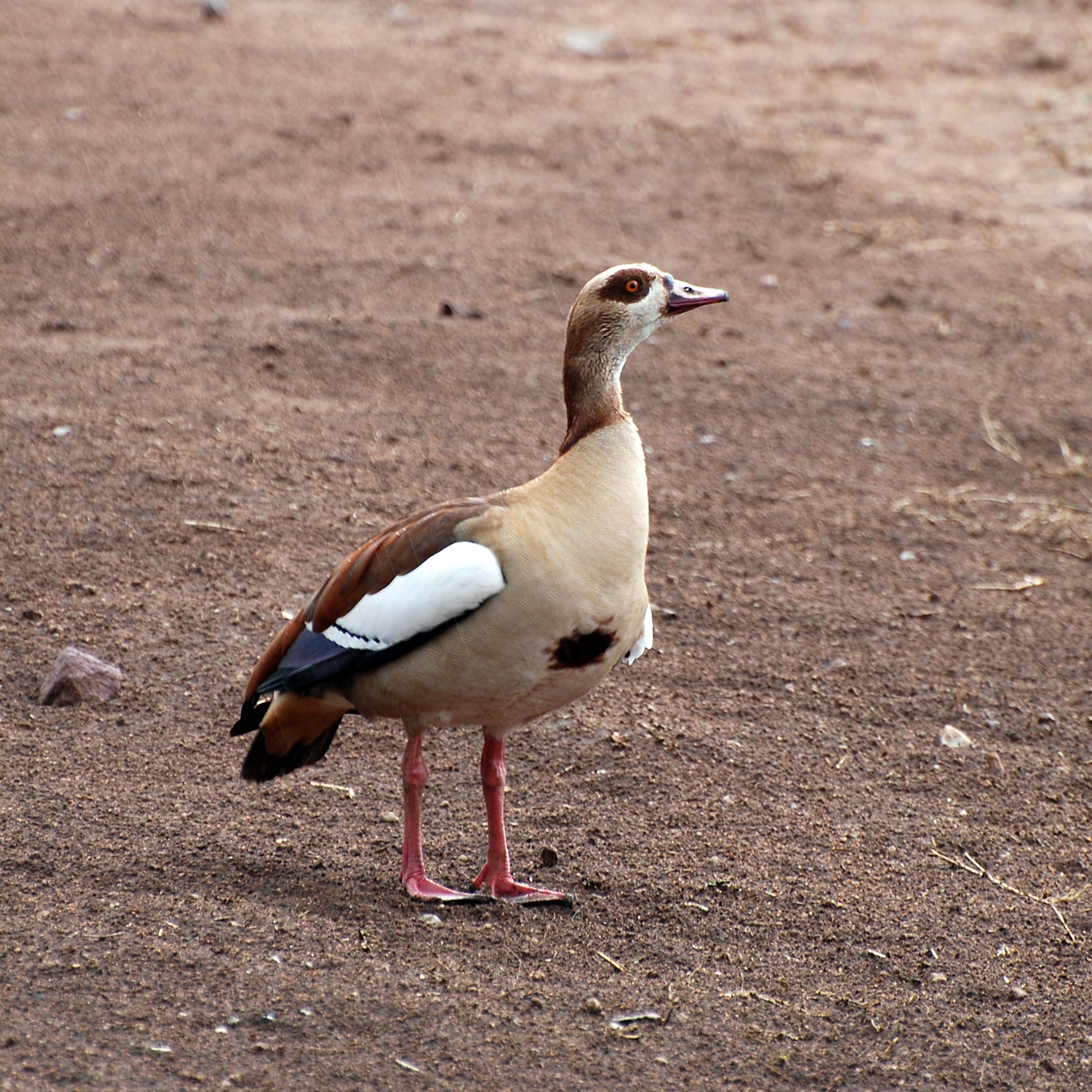
Egyptian goose, Italy

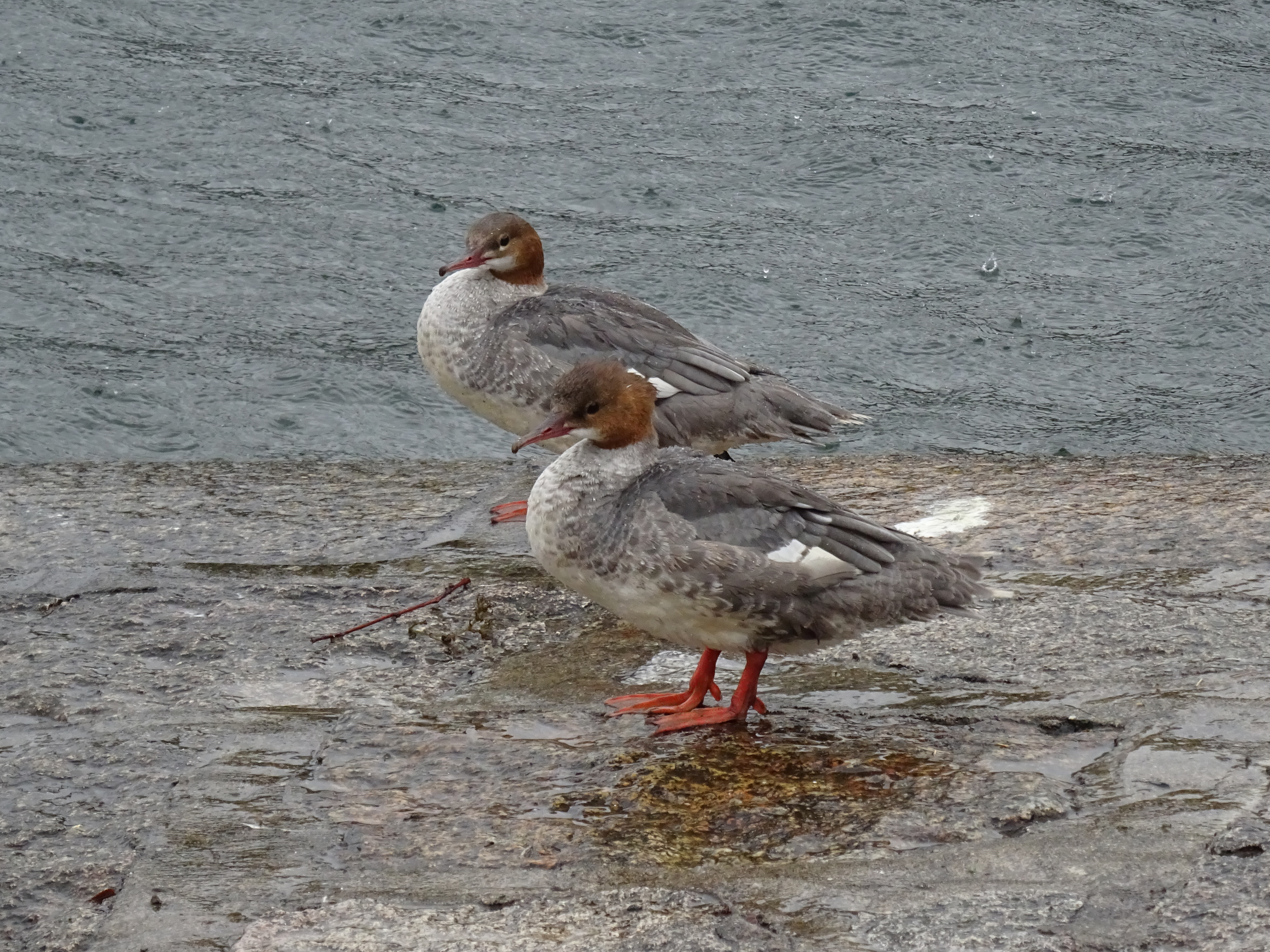
Goosander, Verbania, Piedmont

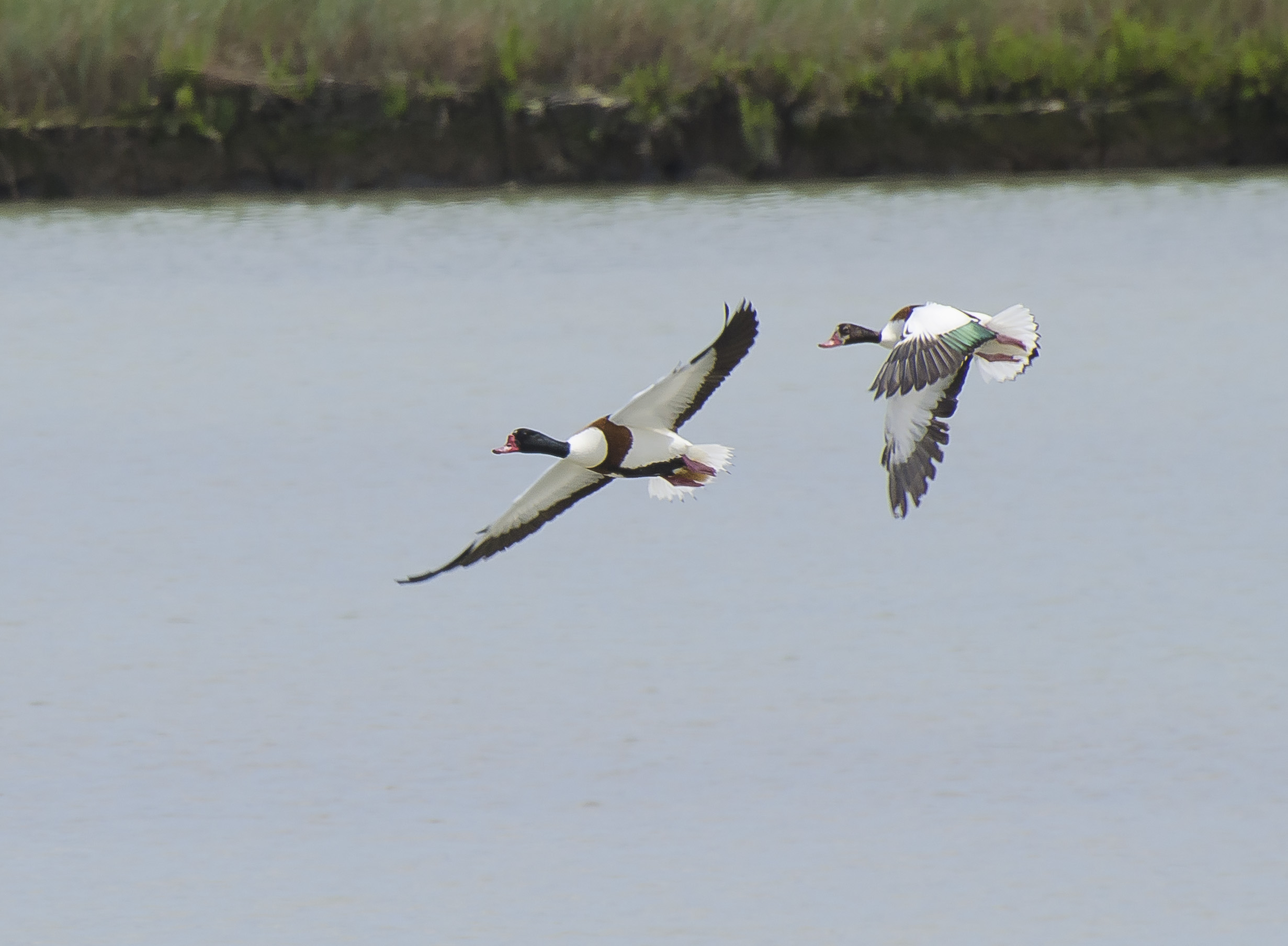
Common shelduck, Venice

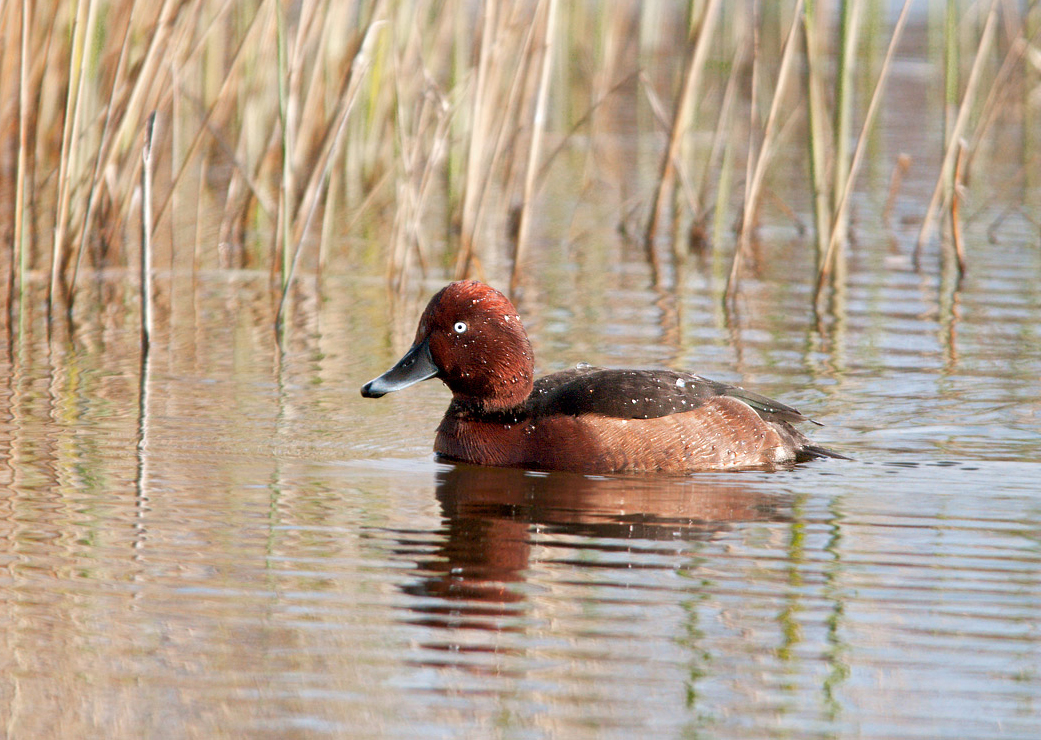
Ferruginous duck, Rome

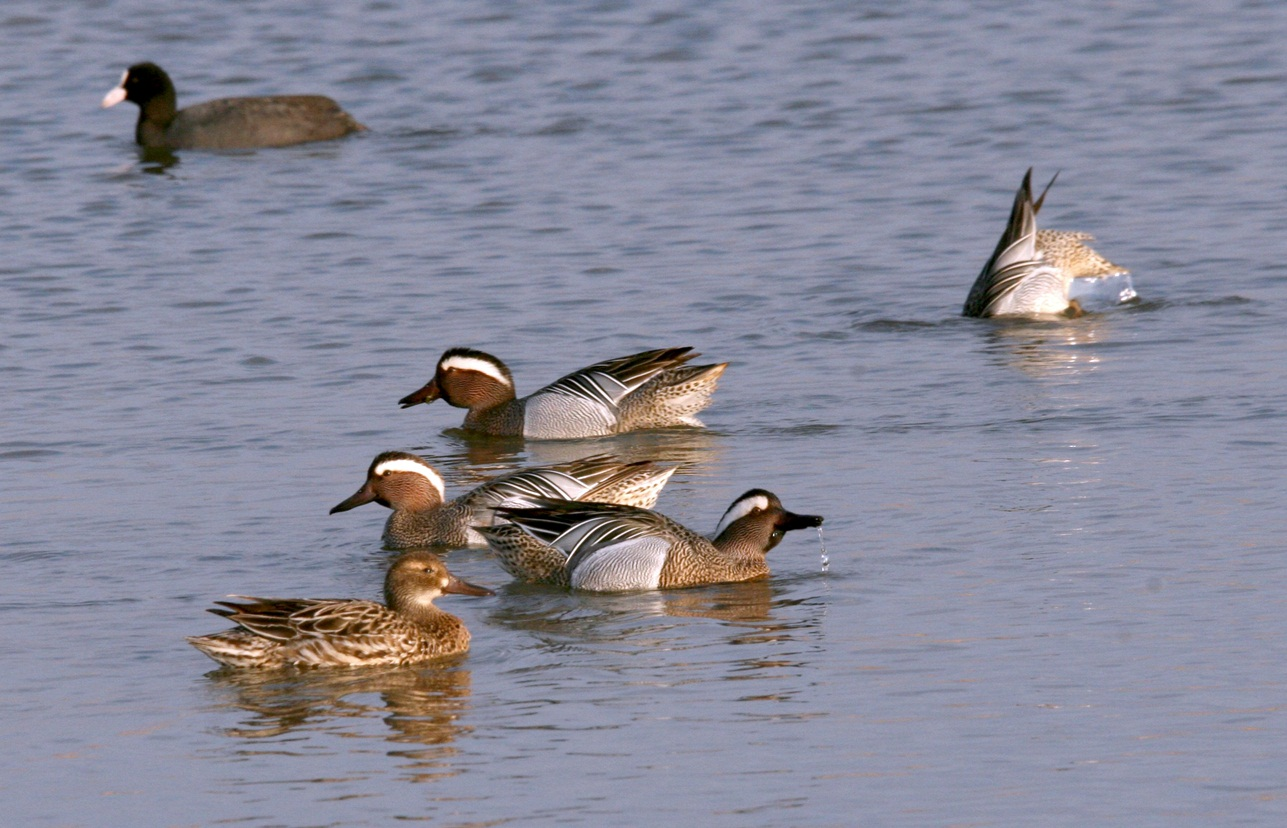
Garganeys (with Eurasian coot), Maremma, Toscana

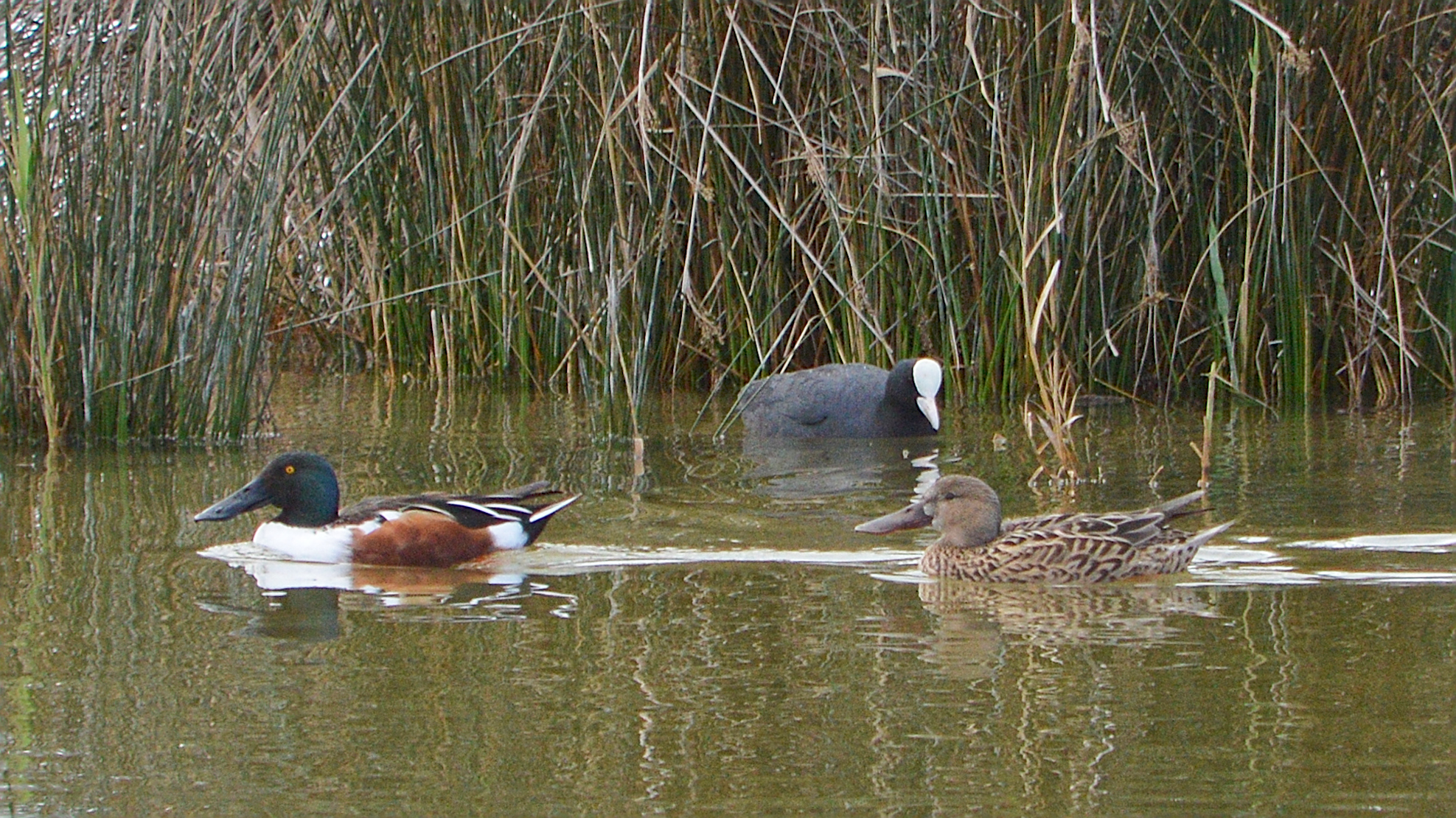
Northern shovelers (with Eurasian coot), Rome

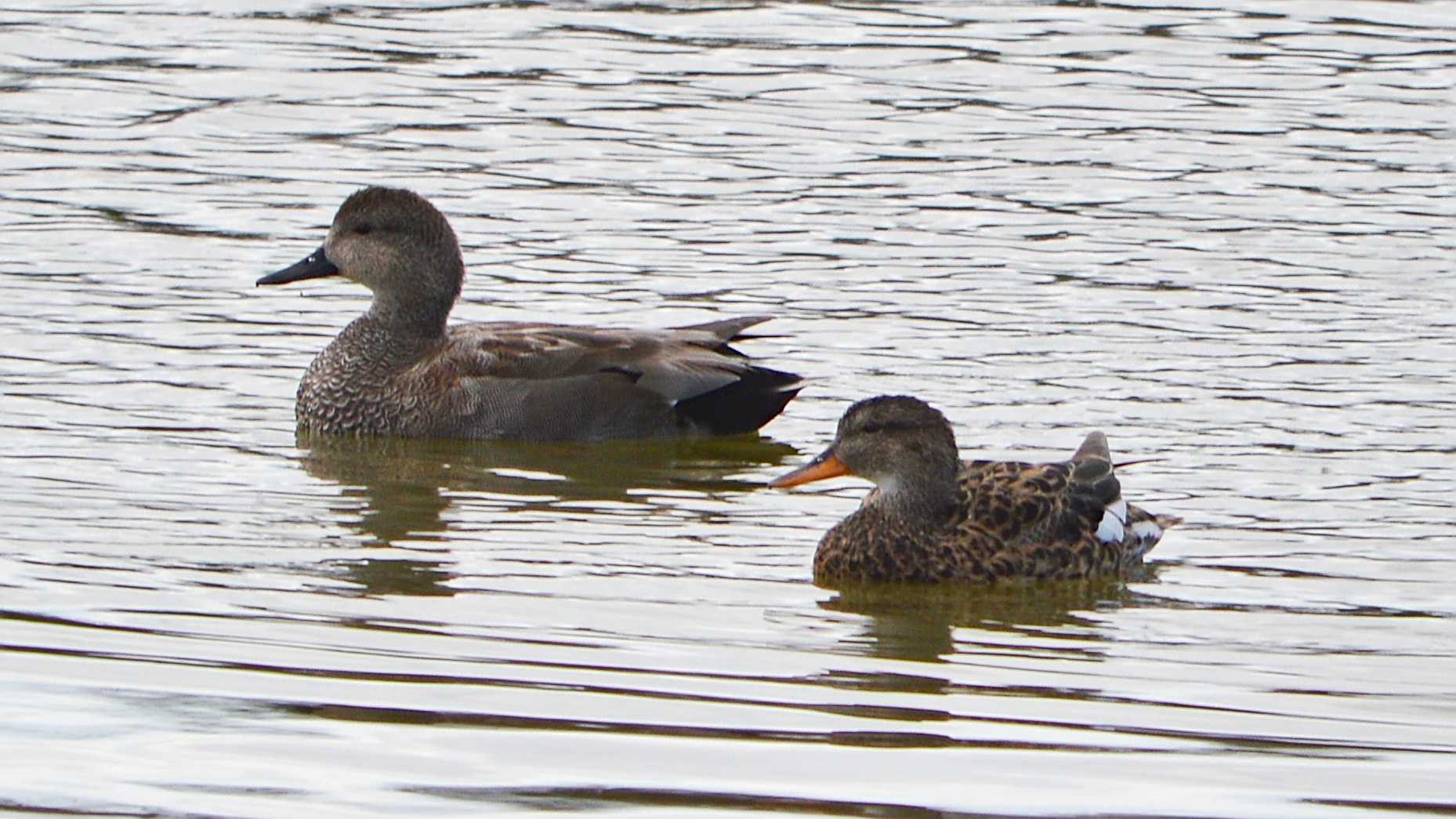
Gadwall, Rome

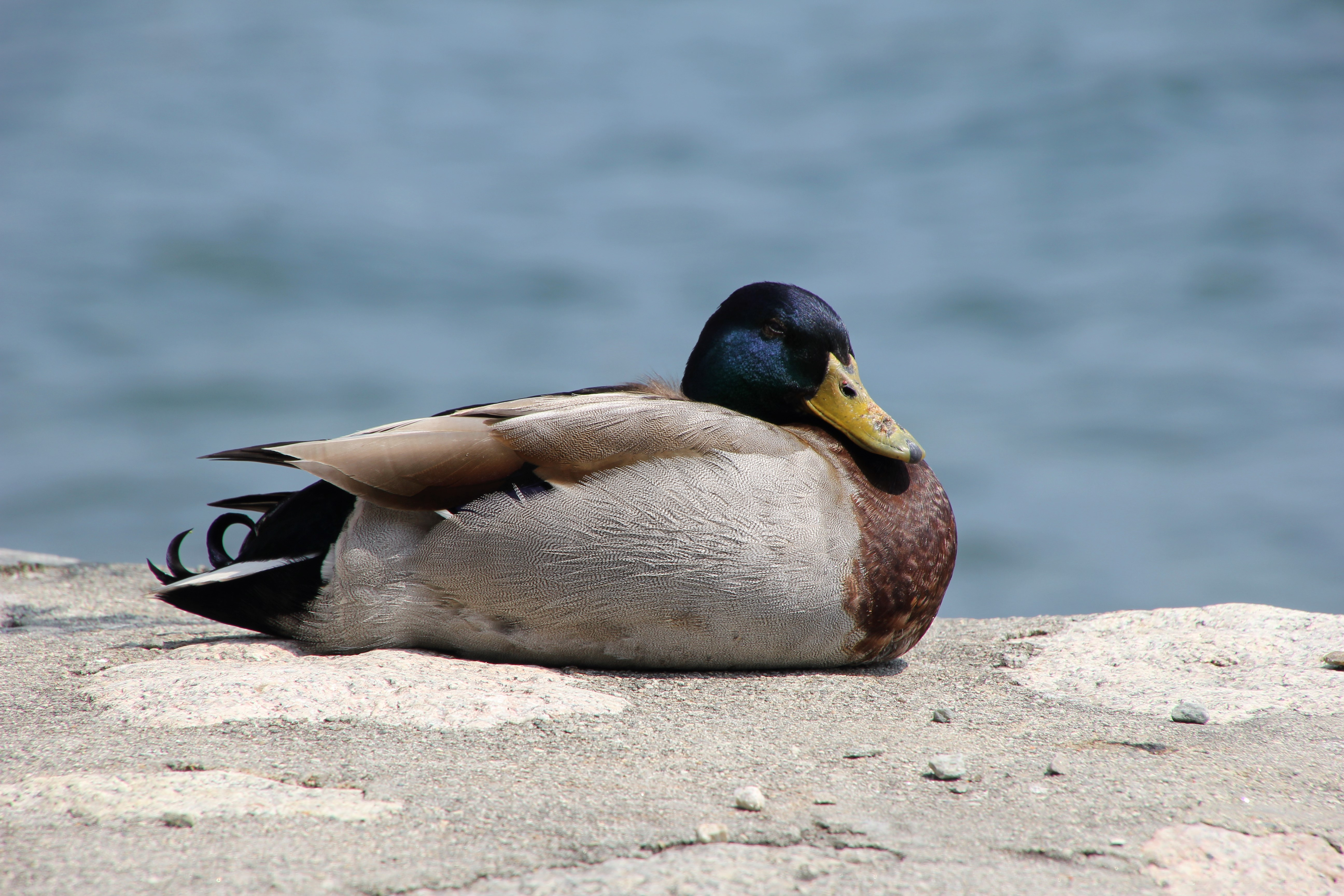
Mallard, Turin

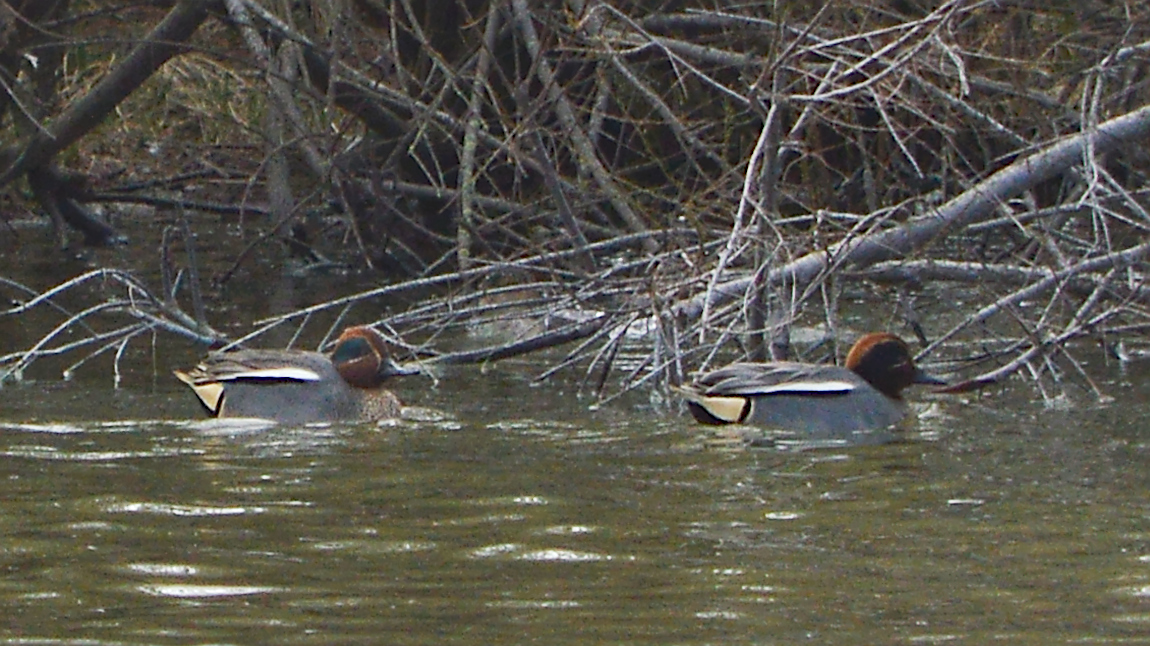
Eurasian teal, Rome

== Grebes ==
Order: Podicipediformes Family: Podicipedidae

Grebes are small to medium-large freshwater diving birds. They have lobed toes and are excellent swimmers and divers. However, they have their feet placed far back on the body, making them ungainly on land.

- Little grebe Tachybaptus ruficollis Tuffetto – A
- Red-necked grebe Podiceps grisegena Svasso collorosso – A
- Great crested grebe Podiceps cristatus Svasso maggiore – A
- Horned grebe Podiceps auritus Svasso cornuto – A
- Black-necked grebe Podiceps nigricollis Svasso piccolo – A
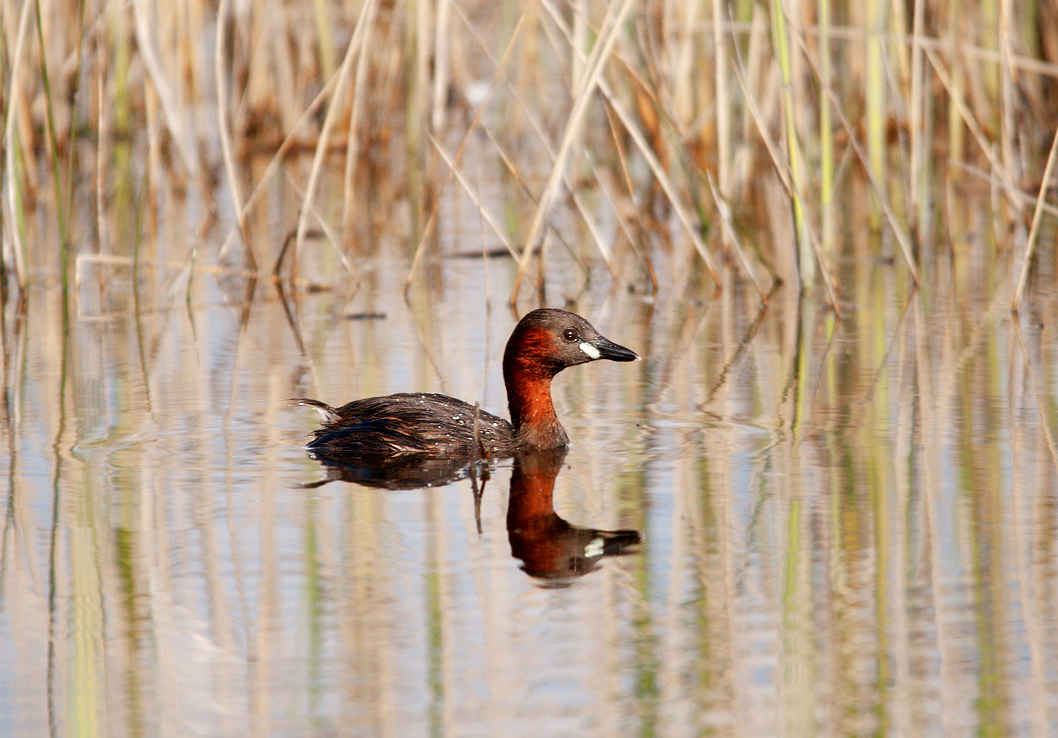
Little grebe, Ostia, Rome

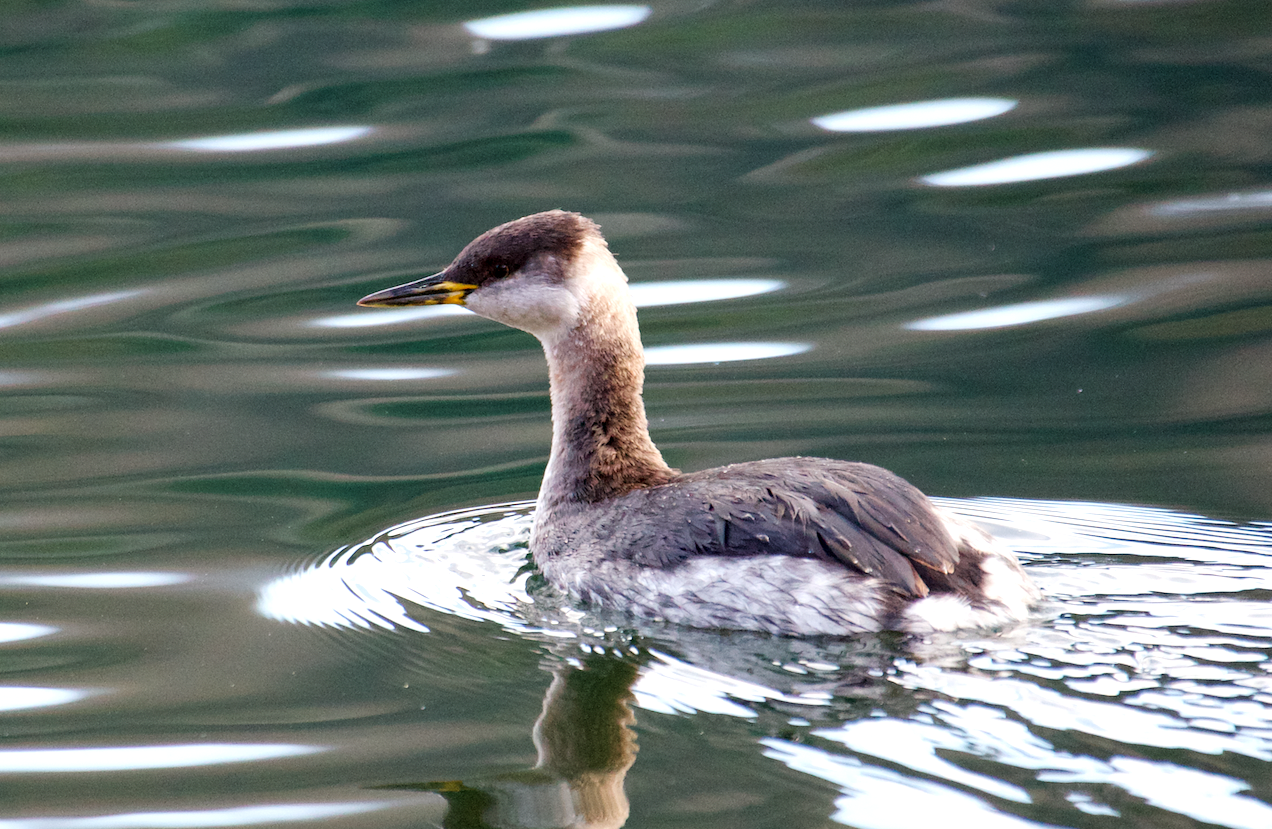
Red-necked grebe, Lago di Monticolo Grande, Montiggler Seen, Bolzano

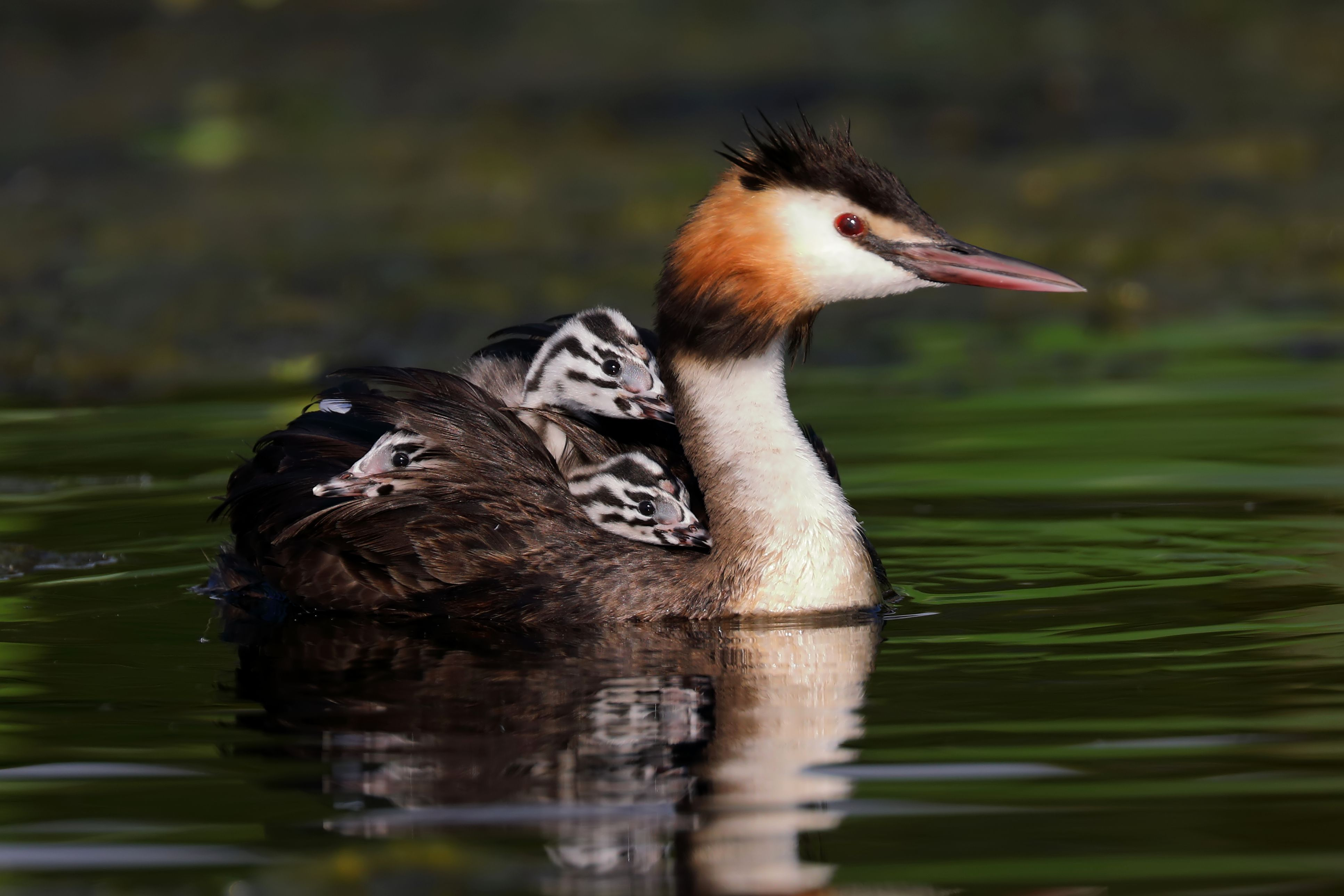
Great crested grebe, Po

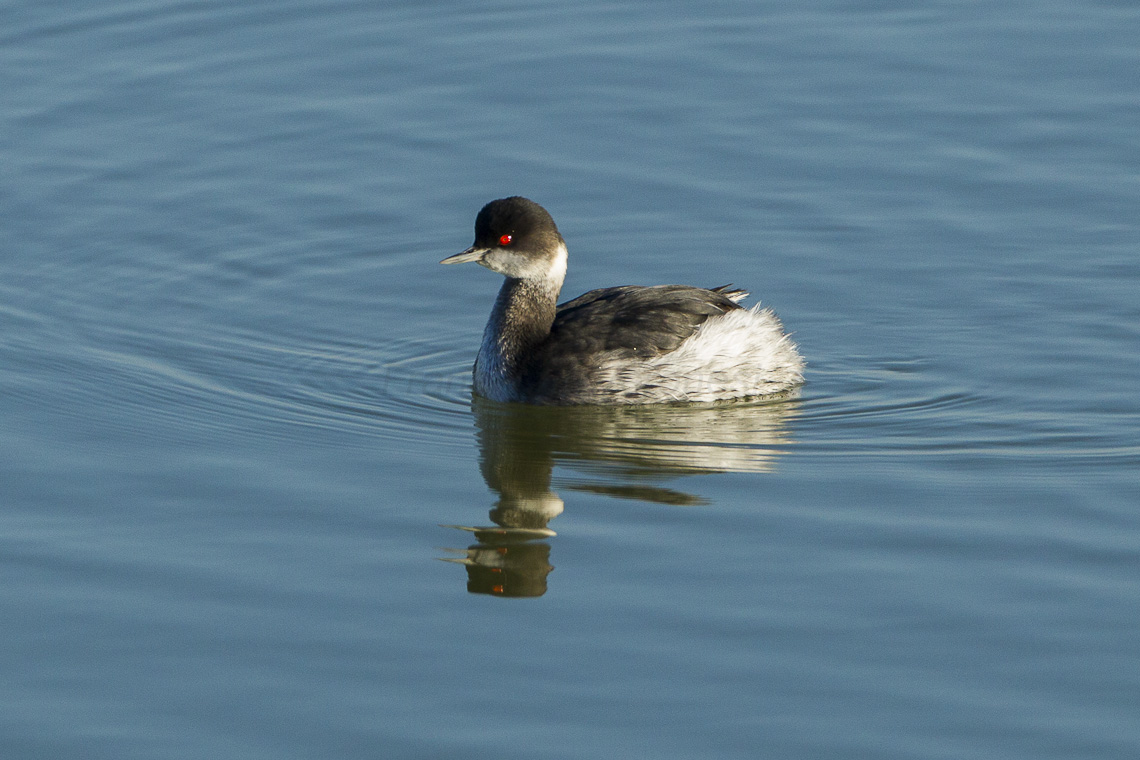
Eared grebe, Po Delta

== Flamingos ==
Order: Phoenicopteriformes Family: Phoenicopteridae

Flamingos are gregarious wading birds, usually 1 to 1.5 metres (3 ft 3 in to 4 ft 11 in) tall, found in both the Western and Eastern Hemispheres. Flamingos filter-feed on shellfish and algae. Their oddly shaped beaks are specially adapted to separate mud and silt from the food they consume and, uniquely, are used upside-down.

- Greater flamingo Phoenicopterus roseus Fenicottero – AC
- Lesser flamingo Phoeniconaias minor Fenicottero minore – A
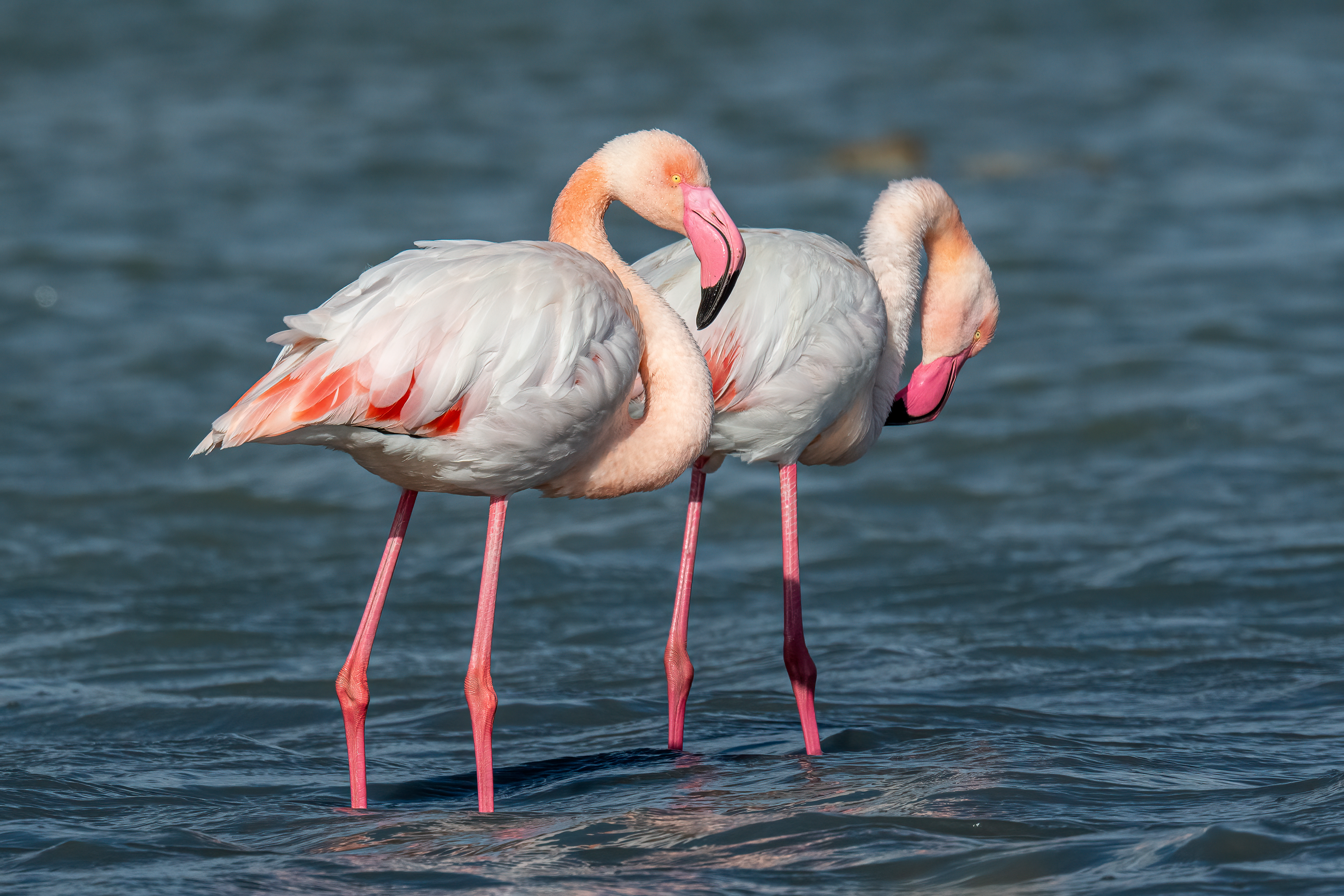
Greater flamingos, Torre Colimena, Taranto

== Pigeons and doves ==
Order: Columbiformes Family: Columbidae

Pigeons and doves are stout-bodied birds with short necks and short slender bills with a fleshy cere.

- Rock dove Columba livia Piccione selvatico – AC
- Stock dove Columba oenas Colombella – A
- Common woodpigeon Columba palumbus Colombaccio – A
- European turtle-dove Streptopelia turtur Tortora selvatica – A
- Oriental turtle-dove, Streptopelia orientalis Tortora orientale – A
- Eurasian collared-dove Streptopelia decaocto Tortora dal collare – A
- Laughing dove Spilopelia senegalensis Tortora delle palme – A
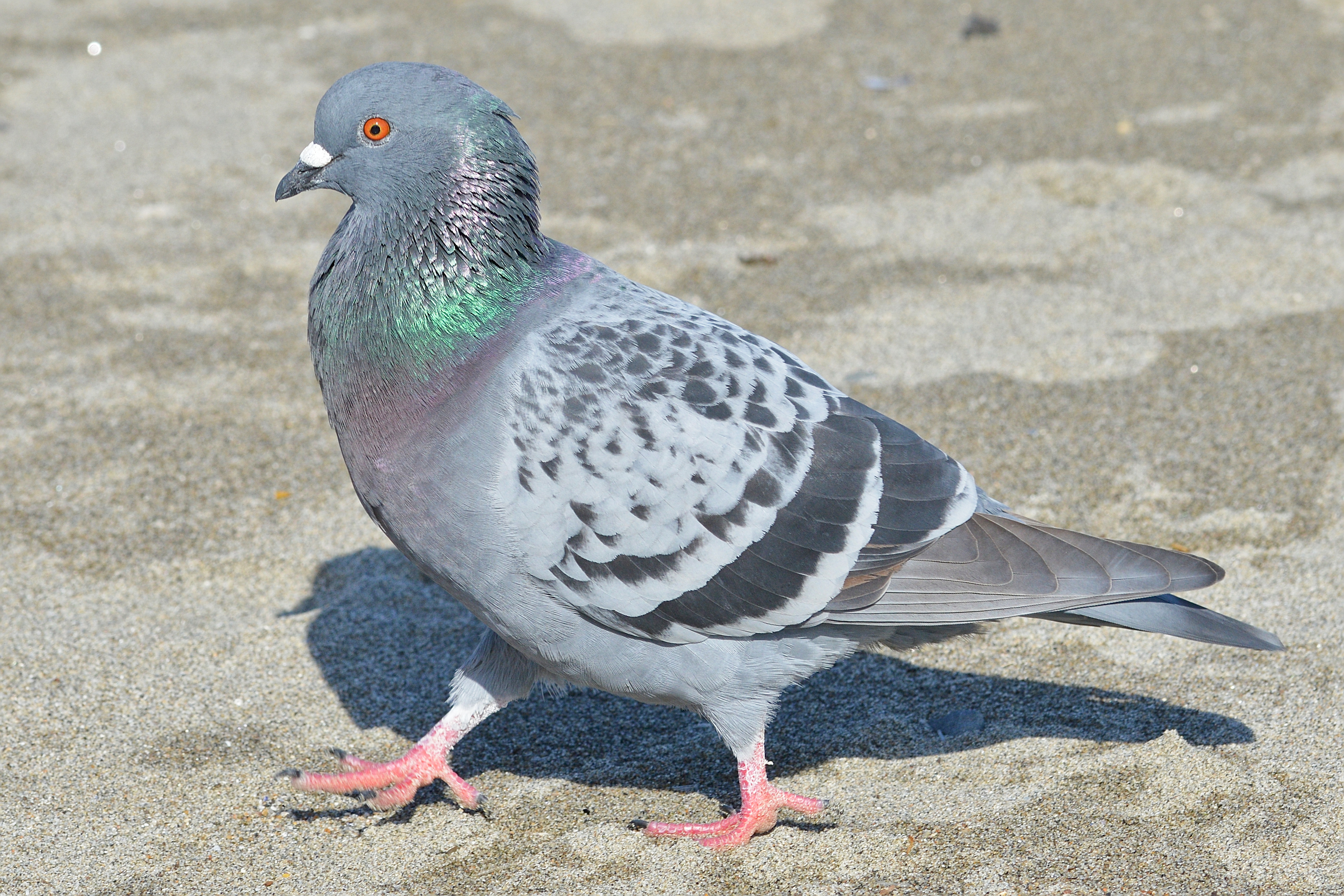
Rock dove, Rome

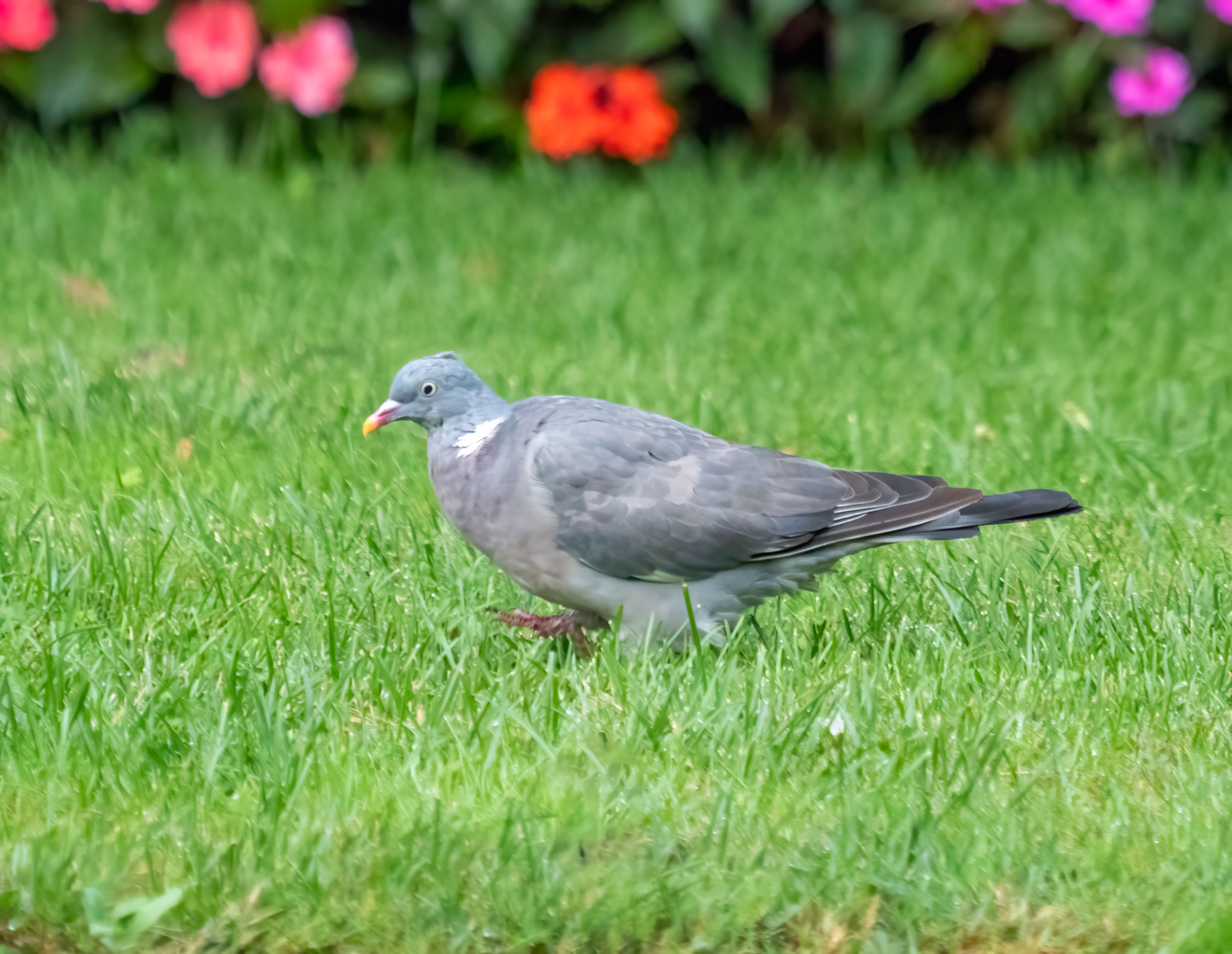
Common woodpigeon, Florence

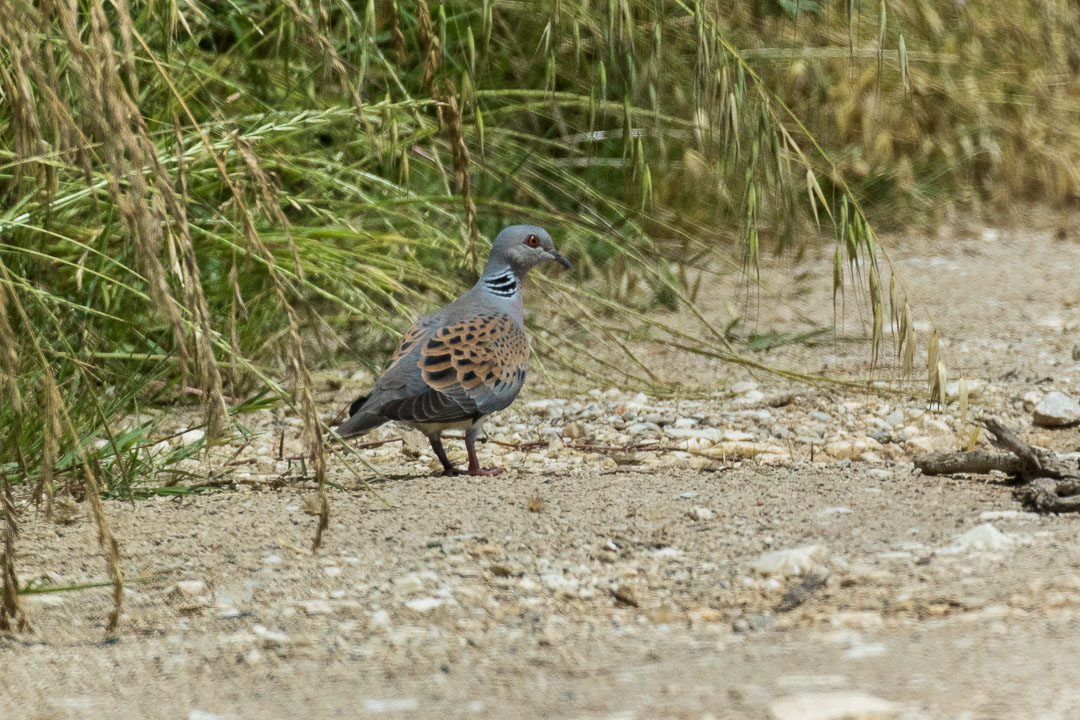
European turtle-dove, Vecchiano, Tuscany

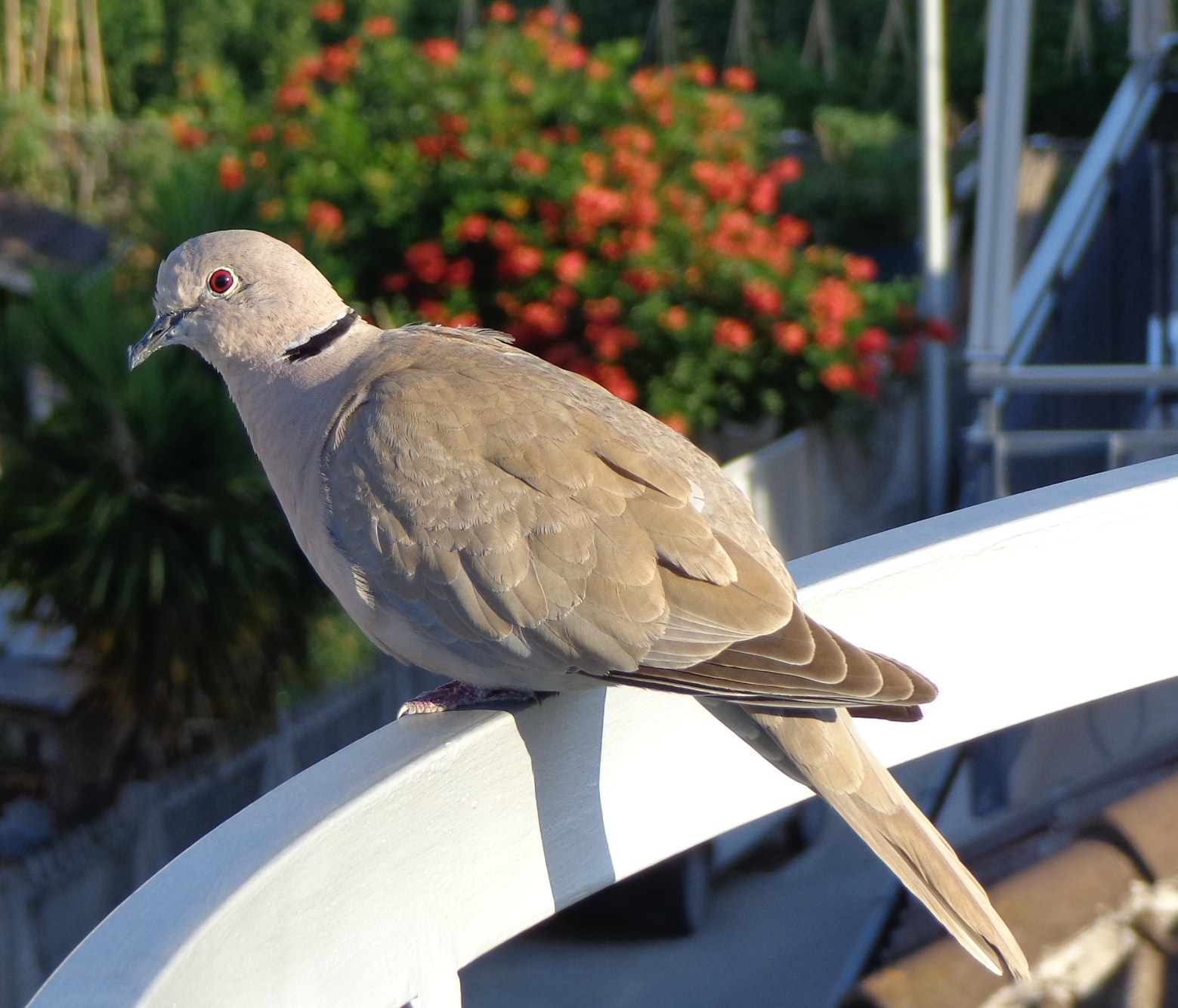
Eurasian collared-dove, Italy

== Sandgrouse ==
Order: Pterocliformes Family: Pteroclidae

Sandgrouse have small, pigeon like heads and necks, but sturdy compact bodies. They have long pointed wings and sometimes tails and a fast direct flight. Flocks fly to watering holes at dawn and dusk. Their legs are feathered down to the toes. All the species recorded in Italy are vagrants.

- Pallas's sandgrouse Syrrhaptes paradoxus Sirratte – A
- Spotted sandgrouse Pterocles senegallus Grandule del Senegal – B
- Pin-tailed sandgrouse Pterocles alchata Grandule – B

== Nightjars and allies ==
Order: Caprimulgiformes Family: Caprimulgidae

Nightjars are medium-sized nocturnal birds that usually nest on the ground. They have long wings, short legs and very short bills. Most have small feet, of little use for walking, and long pointed wings. Their soft plumage is camouflaged to resemble bark or leaves.

- Red-necked nightjar Caprimulgus ruficollis Succiacapre collorosso – A
- Eurasian nightjar Caprimulgus europaeus Succiacapre – A
- Egyptian nightjar Caprimulgus aegyptius Succiacapre isabellino – A

== Swifts ==
Order: Caprimulgiformes Family: Apodidae

Swifts are small birds which spend the majority of their lives flying. These birds have very short legs and never settle voluntarily on the ground, perching instead only on vertical surfaces. Many swifts have long swept-back wings which resemble a crescent.

- Alpine swift Tachymarptis melba Rondone maggiore – A
- Little swift Apus affinis Rondone indiano – A
- Pallid swift Apus pallidus Rondone pallido – A
- Common swift Apus apus Rondone comune – A
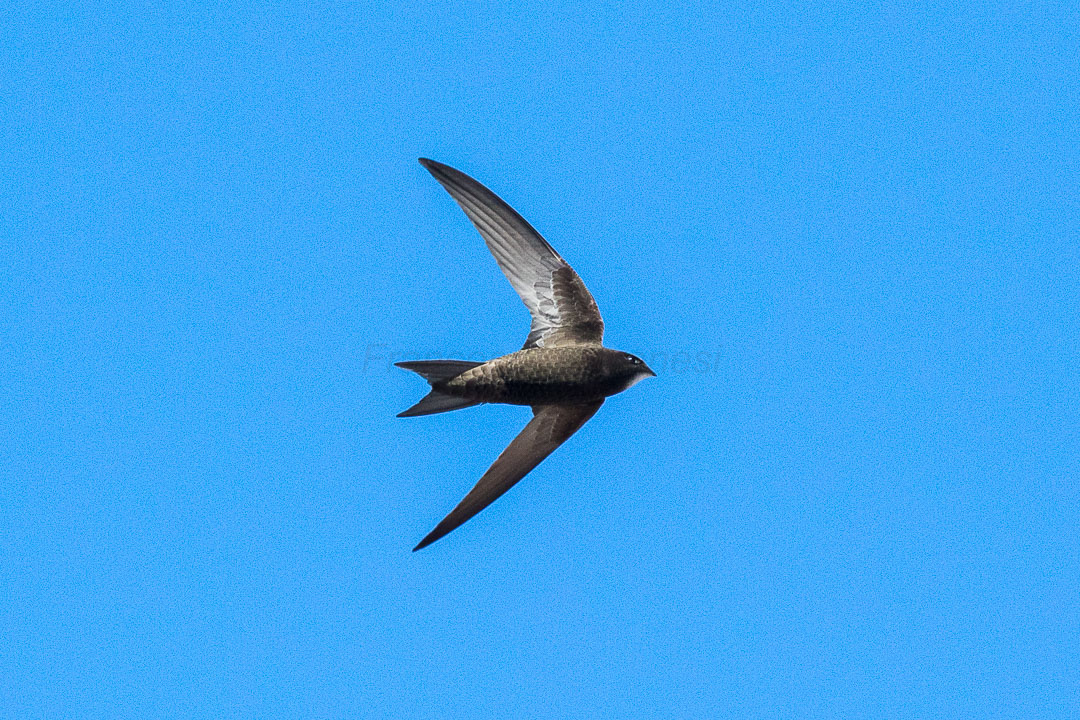
Common swift, Tuscany

== Cuckoos ==
Order: Cuculiformes Family: Cuculidae

The family Cuculidae includes cuckoos and relatives. These birds are of variable size with slender bodies, long tails and strong legs. The Old World cuckoos are brood parasites.

- Great spotted cuckoo Clamator glandarius Cuculo dal ciuffo – A
- Yellow-billed cuckoo Coccyzus americanus Cuculo americano – A
- Black-billed cuckoo Coccyzus erythropthalmus Cuculo occhirossi – B
- Common cuckoo Cuculus canorus Cuculo – A
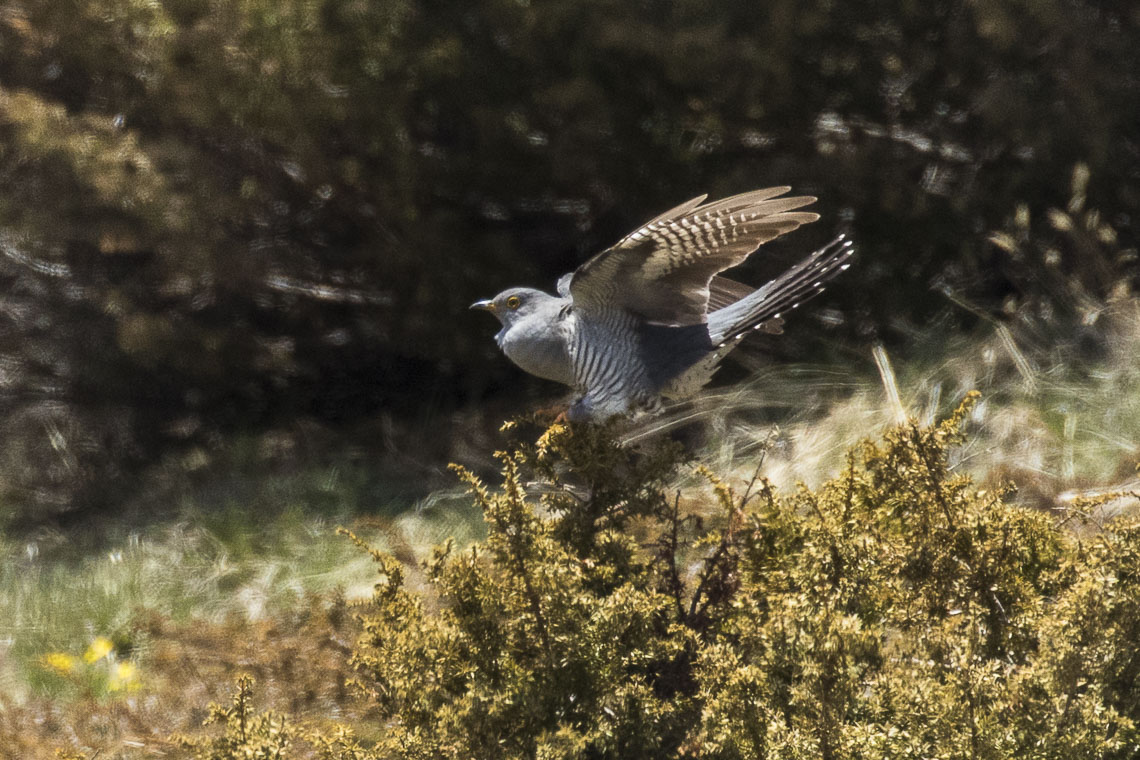
Common cuckoo, Aosta Valley

== Rails, gallinules, and coots ==
Order: Gruiformes Family: Rallidae

Rallidae is a large family of small to medium-sized birds which includes the rails, crakes, coots and moorhens. Typically they inhabit dense vegetation in damp environments near lakes, swamps or rivers. In general they are shy and secretive birds, making them difficult to observe, though some are bold and conspicuous. Most species have strong legs and long toes which are well adapted to soft uneven surfaces. They tend to have short, rounded wings and appear to be weak fliers, though capable of long-distance migration.

- Water rail Rallus aquaticus Porciglione – A
- Corn crake Crex crex Re di quaglie – A
- Spotted crake Porzana porzana Voltolino – A
- Little crake Zapornia parva Schiribilla – A
- Baillon's crake Zapornia pusilla Schiribilla grigiata – A
- Striped crake Aenigmatolimnas marginalis Voltolino striato – A
- Western swamphen Porphyrio porphyrio Pollo sultano – A
- Allen's gallinule Porphyrio alleni Pollo sultano di Allen – A
- Purple gallinule Porphyrio martinica Pollo sultano della Martinica – A
- Common moorhen Gallinula chloropus Gallinella d'acqua – A
- Red-knobbed coot Fulica cristata Folaga crestata – B
- Eurasian coot Fulica atra Folaga – A
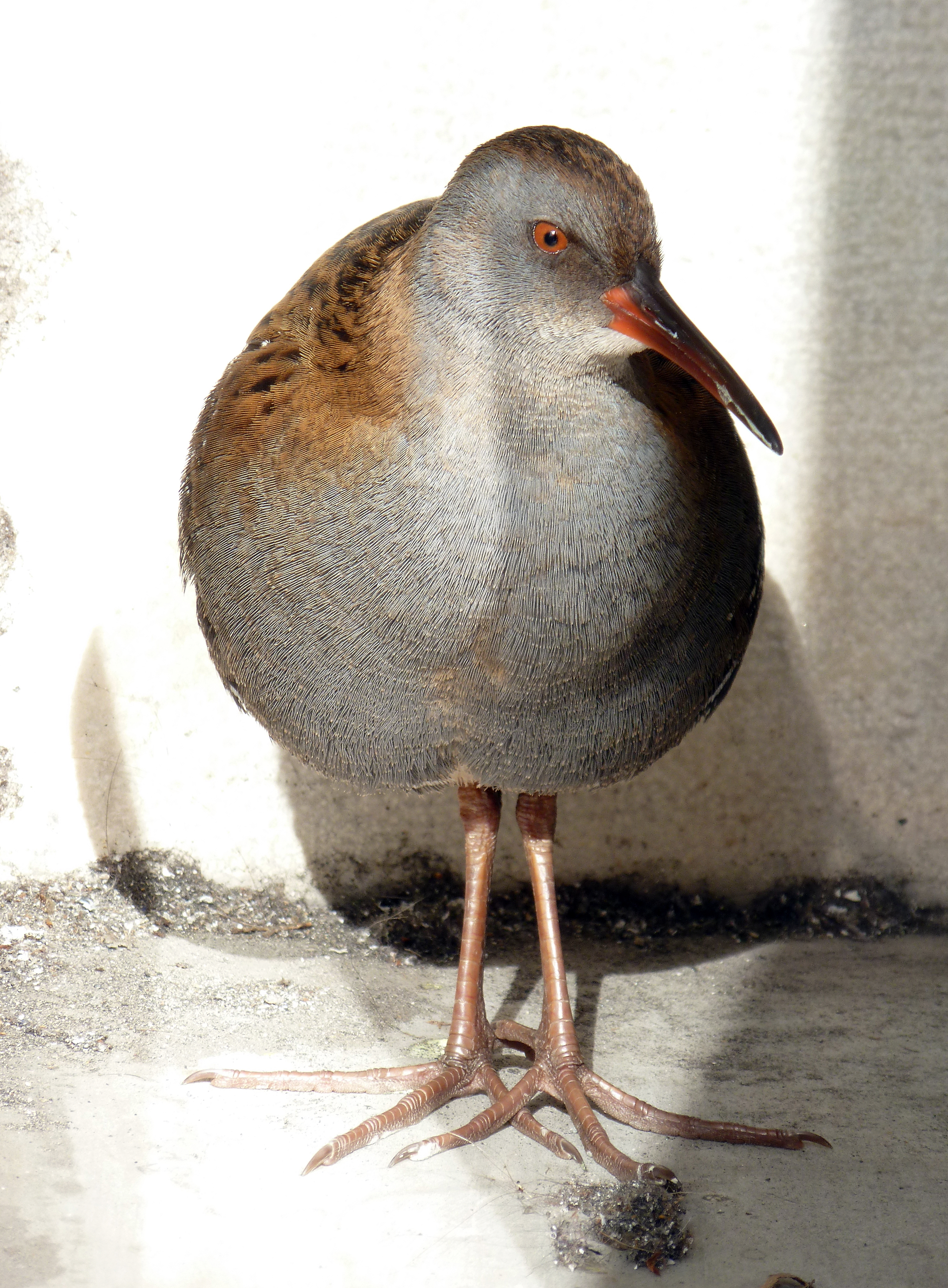
Water rail, Liguria

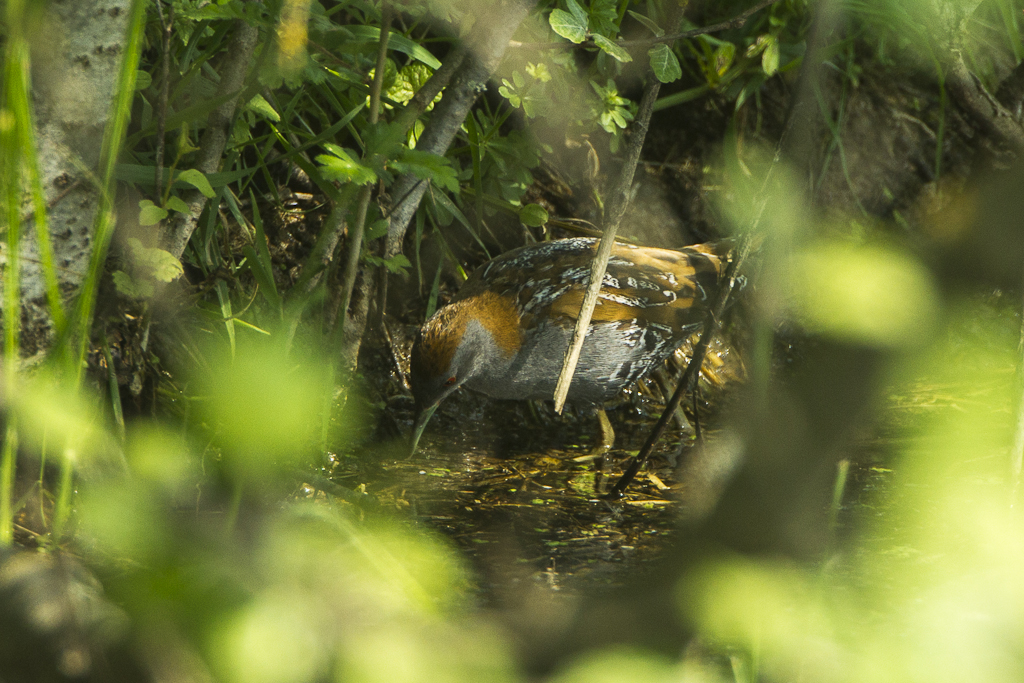
Baillon's crake, Italy

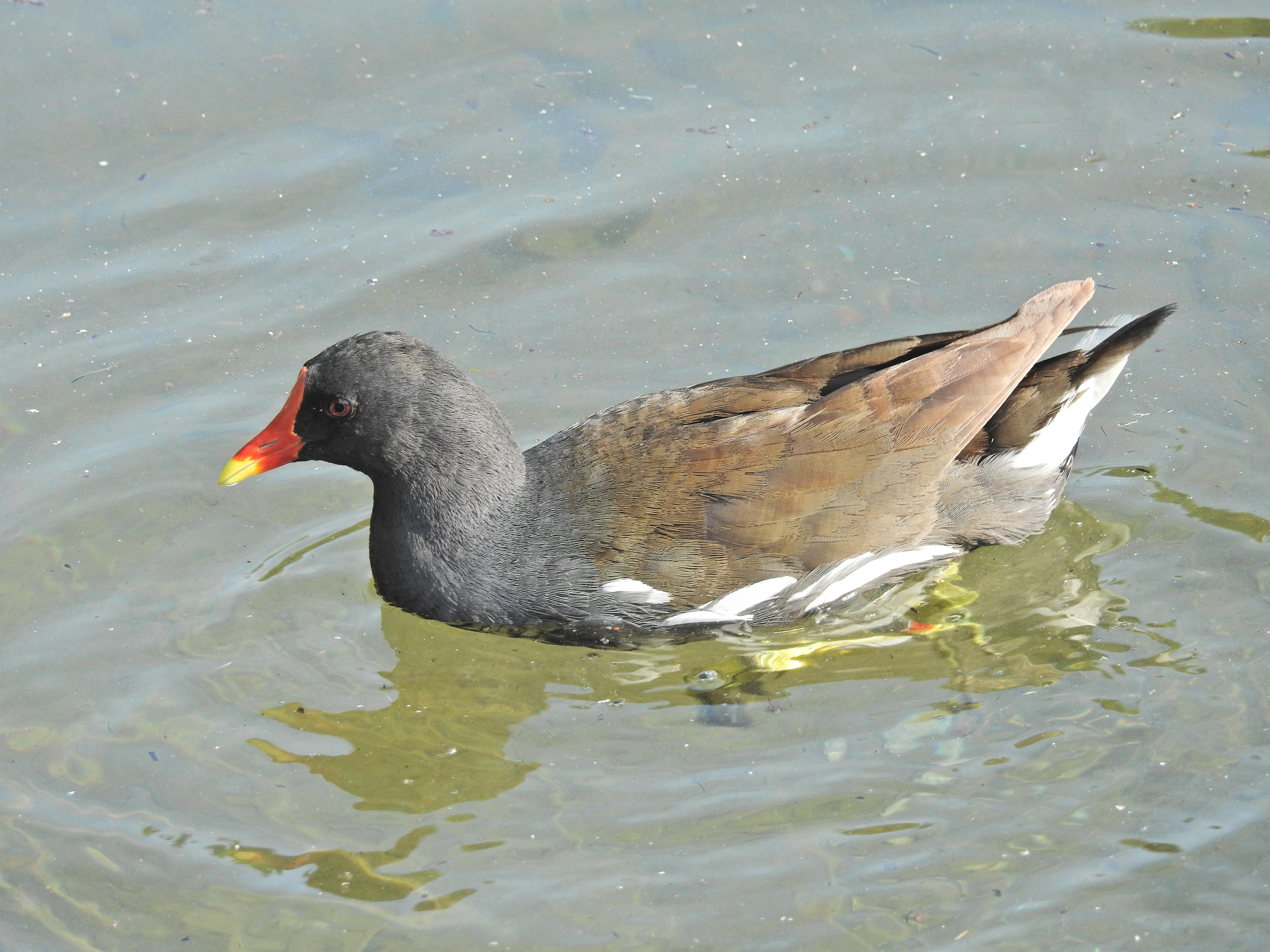
Common moorhen, Milan

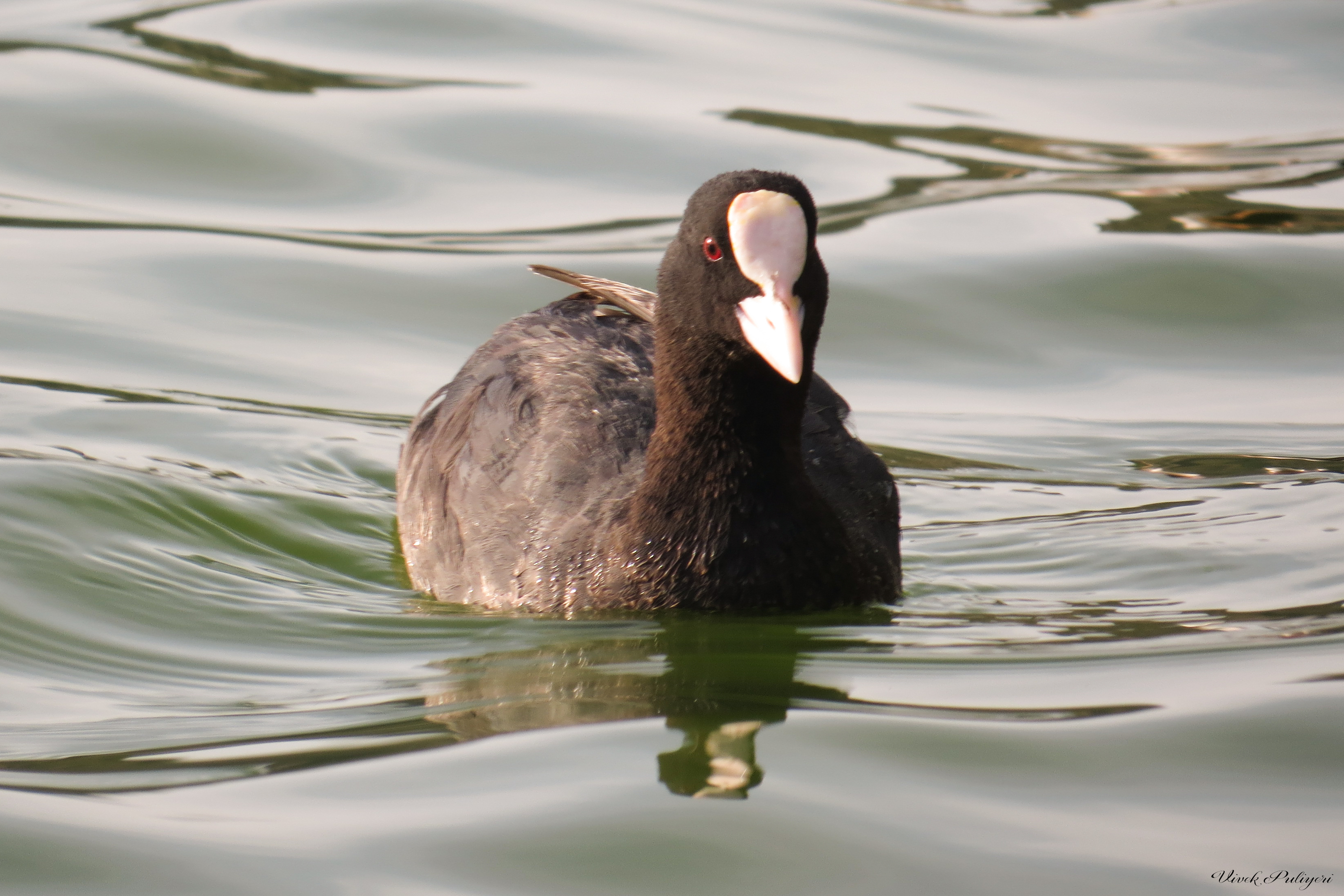
Eurasian coot, Italy

== Cranes ==
Order: Gruiformes Family: Gruidae

Cranes are large, long-legged and long-necked birds. Unlike the similar-looking but unrelated herons, cranes fly with necks outstretched, not pulled back. Most have elaborate and noisy courting displays or "dances".

- Demoiselle crane Grus virgo Damigella della Numidia – A
- Common crane Grus grus Gru – A

== Bustards ==
Order: Otidiformes Family: Otididae

Bustards are large terrestrial birds mainly associated with dry open country and steppes in the Old World. They are omnivorous and nest on the ground. They walk steadily on strong legs and big toes, pecking for food as they go. They have long broad wings with "fingered" wingtips and striking patterns in flight. Many have interesting mating displays.

- Little bustard Tetrax tetrax Gallina prataiola – A
- Great bustard Otis tarda Otarda – A
- Houbara bustard Chlamydotis undulata Ubara africana – B
- MacQueen's bustard Chlamydotis macqueenii Ubara asiatica – A

== Loons ==
Order: Gaviiformes Family: Gaviidae

Loons, known as divers in Europe, are a group of aquatic birds found in many parts of North America and northern Europe. They are the size of a large duck or small goose, which they somewhat resemble when swimming, but to which they are completely unrelated.

- Red-throated loon Gavia stellata Strolaga minore – A
- Arctic loon Gavia arctica Strolaga mezzana – A
- Common loon Gavia immer Strolaga maggiore – A
- Yellow-billed loon Gavia adamsii Strolaga beccogiallo – A

== Southern storm petrels ==
Order: Procellariiformes Family: Oceanitidae

Southern storm petrels, are seabirds in the family Oceanitidae, part of the order Procellariiformes. These very small seabirds feed on planktonic crustaceans and small fish picked from the surface, typically while hovering. Their flight is fluttering and sometimes bat-like.

- Wilson's storm petrel Oceanites oceanicus Uccello delle tempeste di Wilson – A

== Northern storm petrels ==
Order: Procellariiformes Family: Hydrobatidae

The northern storm petrels are relatives of the petrels and are very small seabirds. They feed on planktonic crustaceans and small fish picked from the surface, typically while hovering. The flight is fluttering and sometimes bat-like.

- European storm petrel Hydrobates pelagicus Uccello delle tempeste – A
- Leach's storm petrel Hydrobates leucorhous Uccello delle tempeste codaforcuta – A
- Swinhoe's storm petrel Hydrobates monorhis Uccello delle tempeste di Swinhoe – A

== Albatrosses ==
Order: Procellariiformes Family: Diomedeidae

The albatrosses are among the largest flying birds, with long, narrow wings for gliding. The majority are found in the Southern Hemisphere with only vagrants occurring in the North Atlantic.

- Tristan albatross Diomedea dabbenena Albatro urlatore atlantico – A
- Black-browed albatross Thalassarche melanophris Albatro sopracciglineri – A

== Shearwaters and petrels ==
Order: Procellariiformes Family: Procellariidae

The procellariids are the main group of medium-sized petrels and shearwaters, characterised by united nostrils with medium septum and a functional long outer primary.

- Southern giant petrel Macronectes giganteus Ossifraga – A
- Northern fulmar Fulmarus glacialis Fulmaro – A
- Cape petrel Daption capense Procellaria del Capo – A
- Sooty shearwater Ardenna grisea Berta grigia – A
- Great shearwater Ardenna gravis Berta dell'Atlantico – A
- Scopoli's shearwater Calonectris diomedea Berta maggiore – A
- Cory's shearwater Calonectris borealis Berta maggiore atlantica – A
- Yelkouan shearwater Puffinus yelkouan Berta minore – A
- Balearic shearwater Puffinus mauretanicus Berta balearica – A
- Barolo shearwater Puffinus baroli Berta minore fosca – A
- Bulwer's petrel Bulweria bulwerii Berta di Bulwer – A

== Storks ==
Order: Ciconiiformes Family: Ciconiidae

Storks are large, long-legged, long-necked, wading birds with long, stout bills. Storks are mute, but bill-clattering is an important mode of communication at the nest. Their nests can be large and may be reused for many years. Many species are migratory.

- Black stork Ciconia nigra Cicogna nera – A
- White stork Ciconia ciconia Cicogna bianca – AC
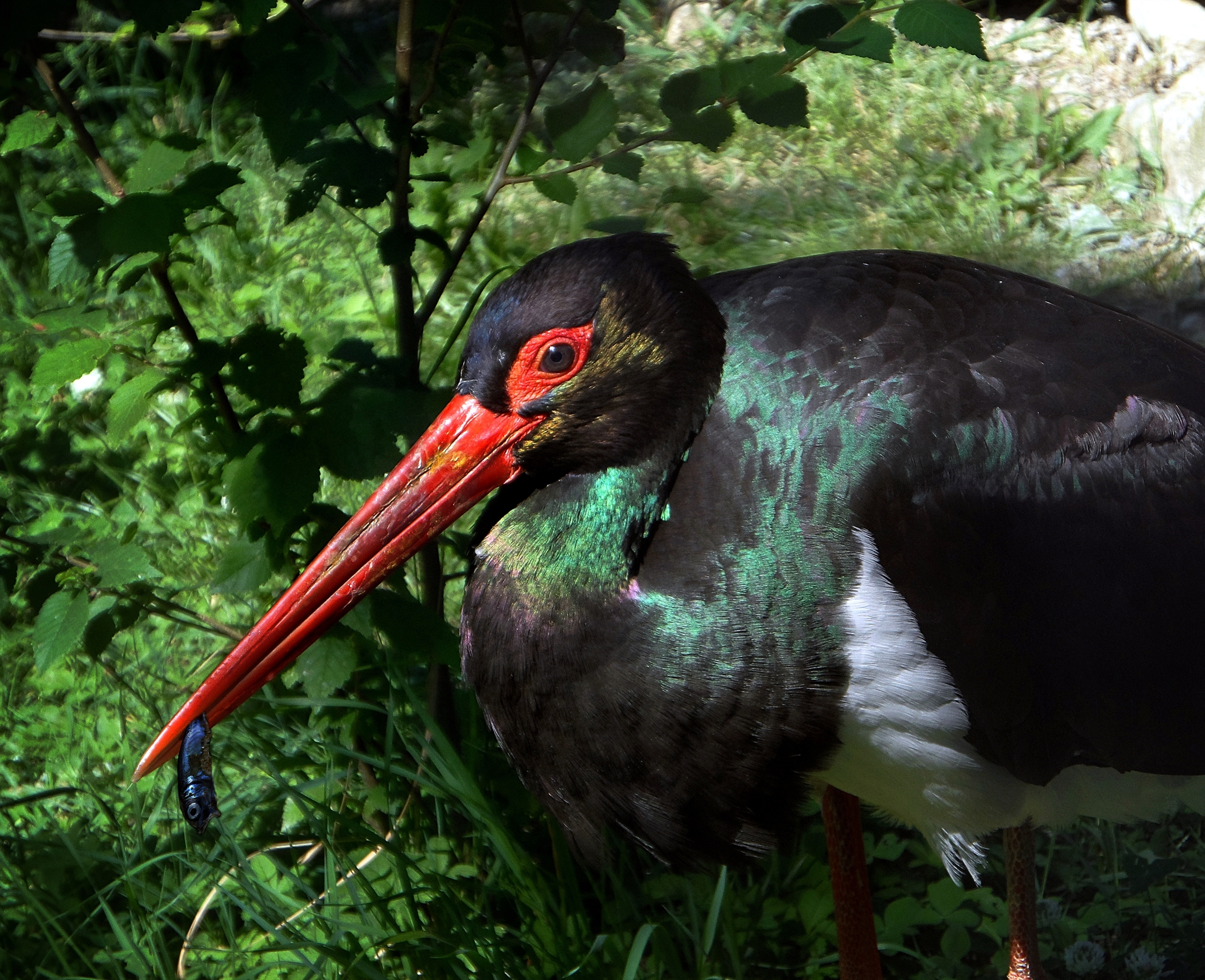
Black stork, Jesi, Marche

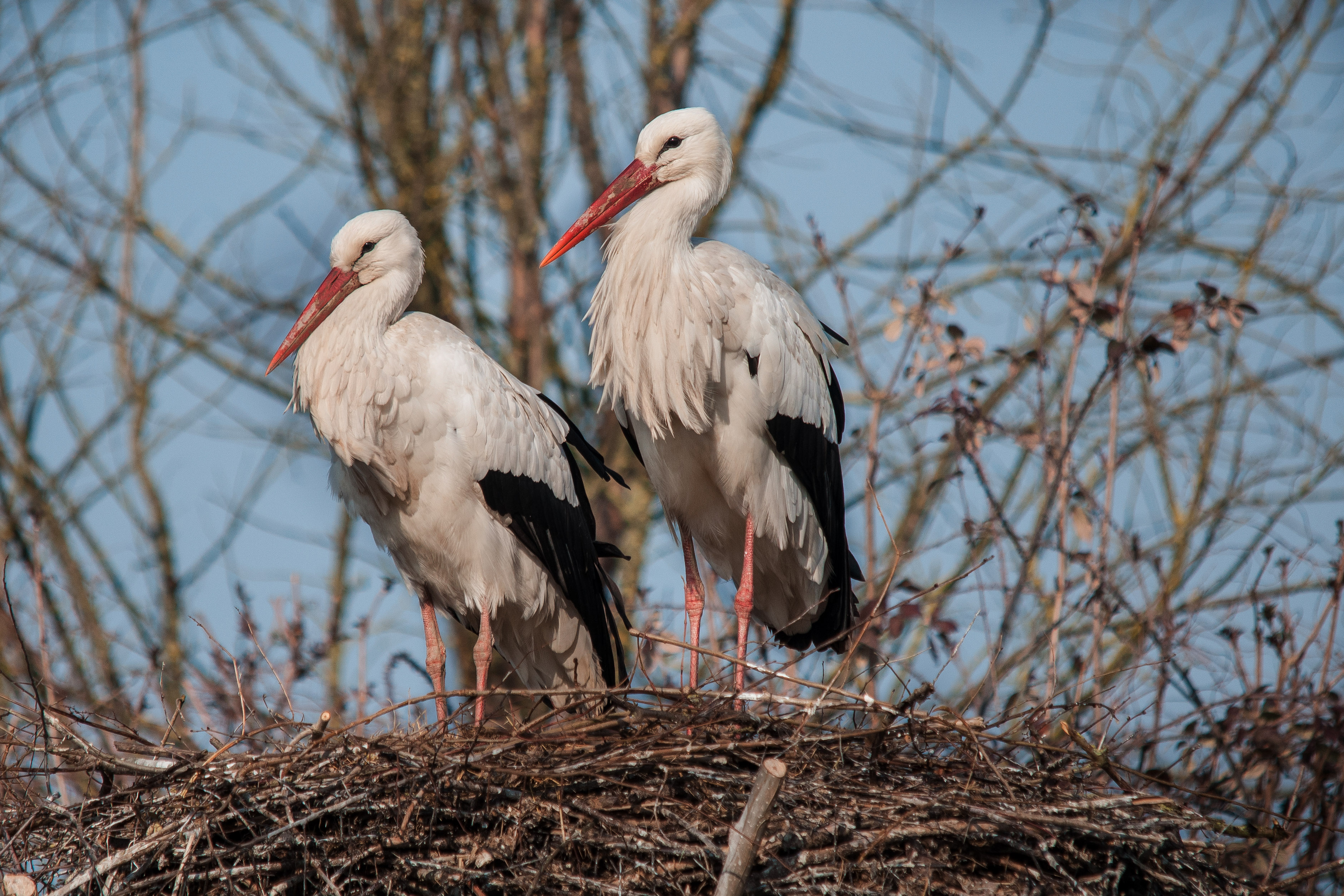
White storks, near Bologna

== Ibises and spoonbills ==
Order: Pelecaniformes Family: Threskiornithidae

Threskiornithidae is a family of large terrestrial and wetland birds which includes the ibises and spoonbills. They have long, broad wings with 11 primary and about 20 secondary feathers. They are strong fliers and despite their size and weight, very capable soarers. Northern bald ibis Geronticus eremita (Ibis eremita) is in the process of being reintroduced after 15th or 16th century local extinction, but is not established yet.

- Eurasian spoonbill Platalea leucorodia Spatola – A
- African sacred ibis Threskiornis aethiopicus Ibis sacro – C
- Glossy ibis Plegadis falcinellus Mignattaio – A
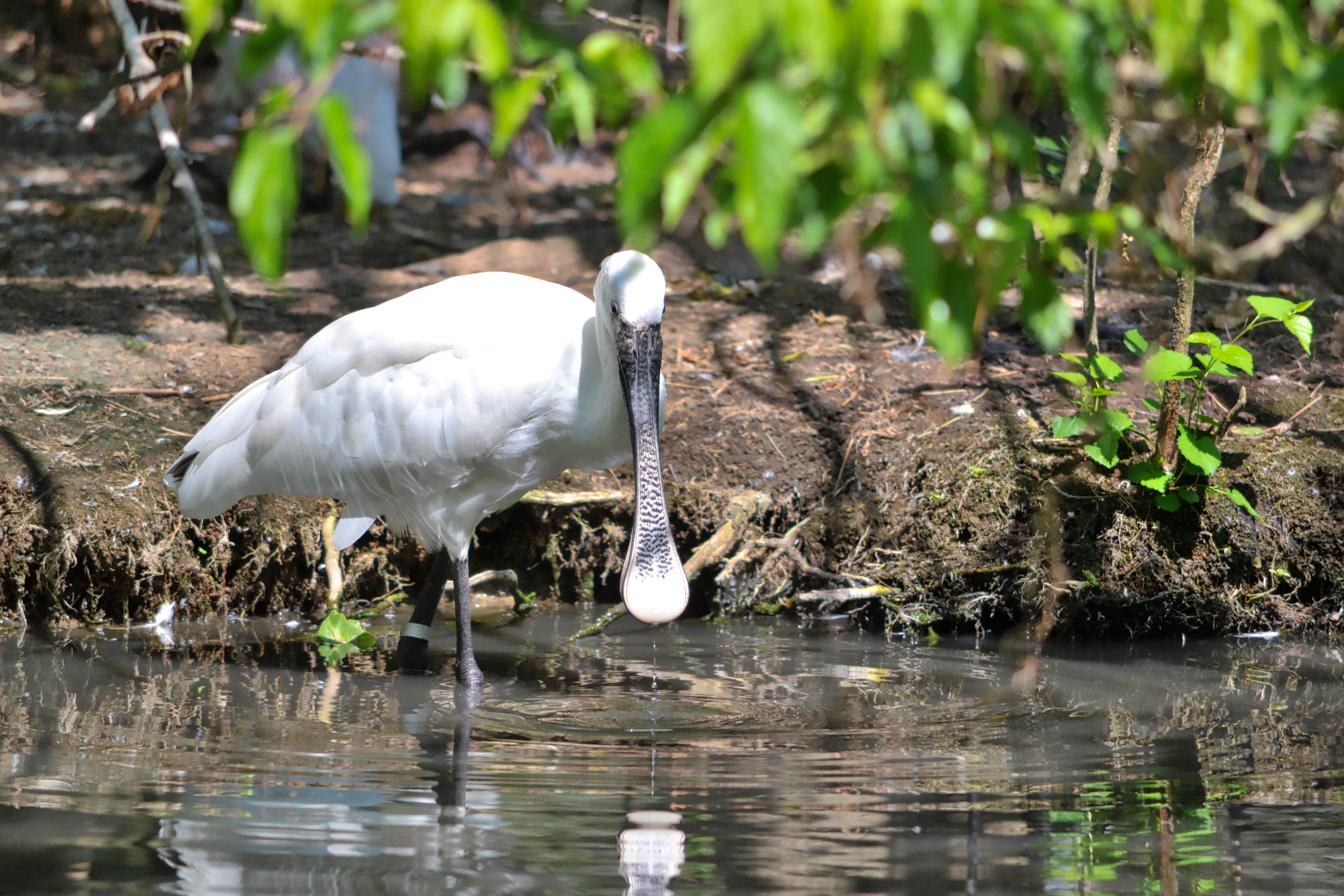
Eurasian spoonbill, Sant'Alessio Siculo

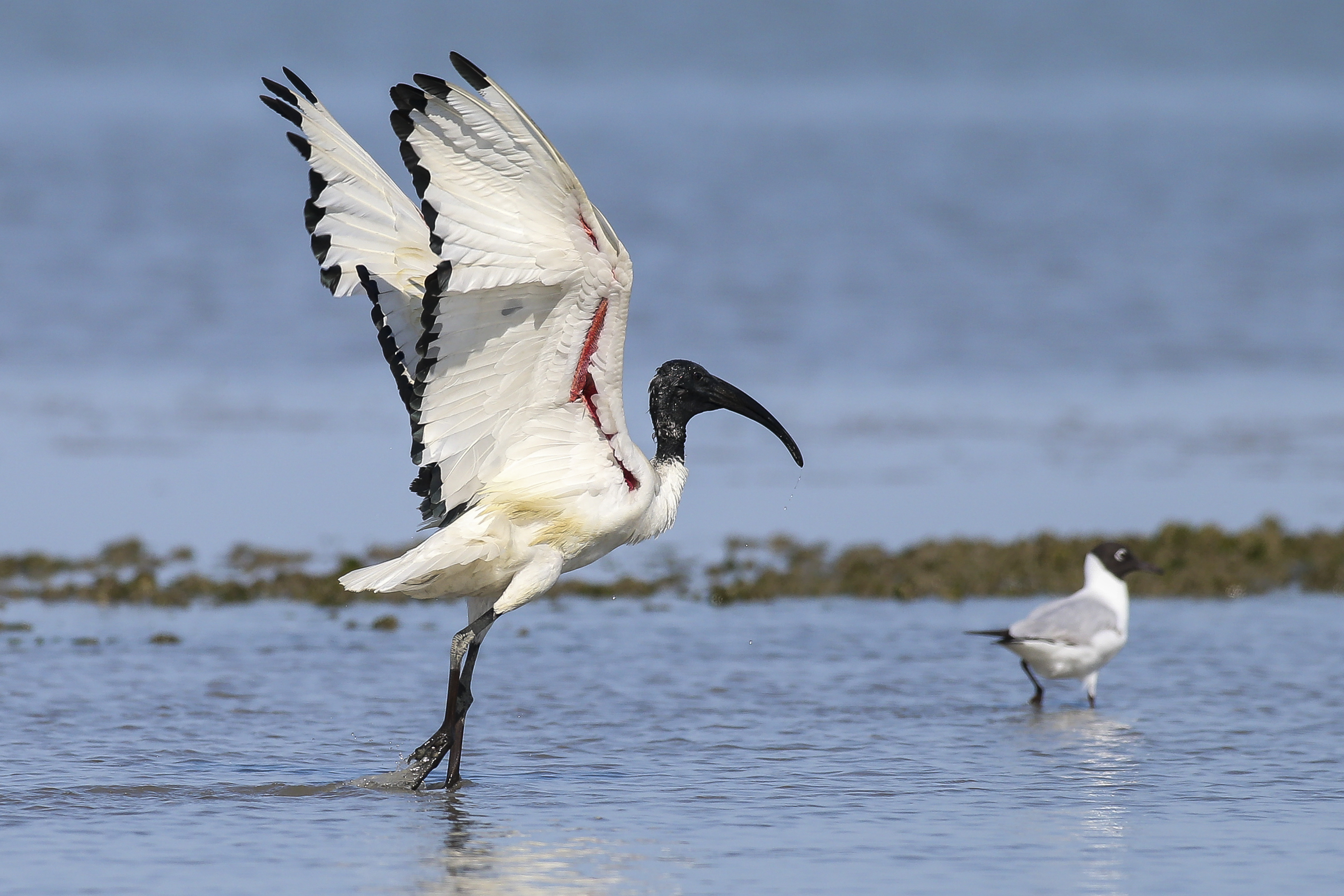
African sacred ibis, Goro, Ferrara

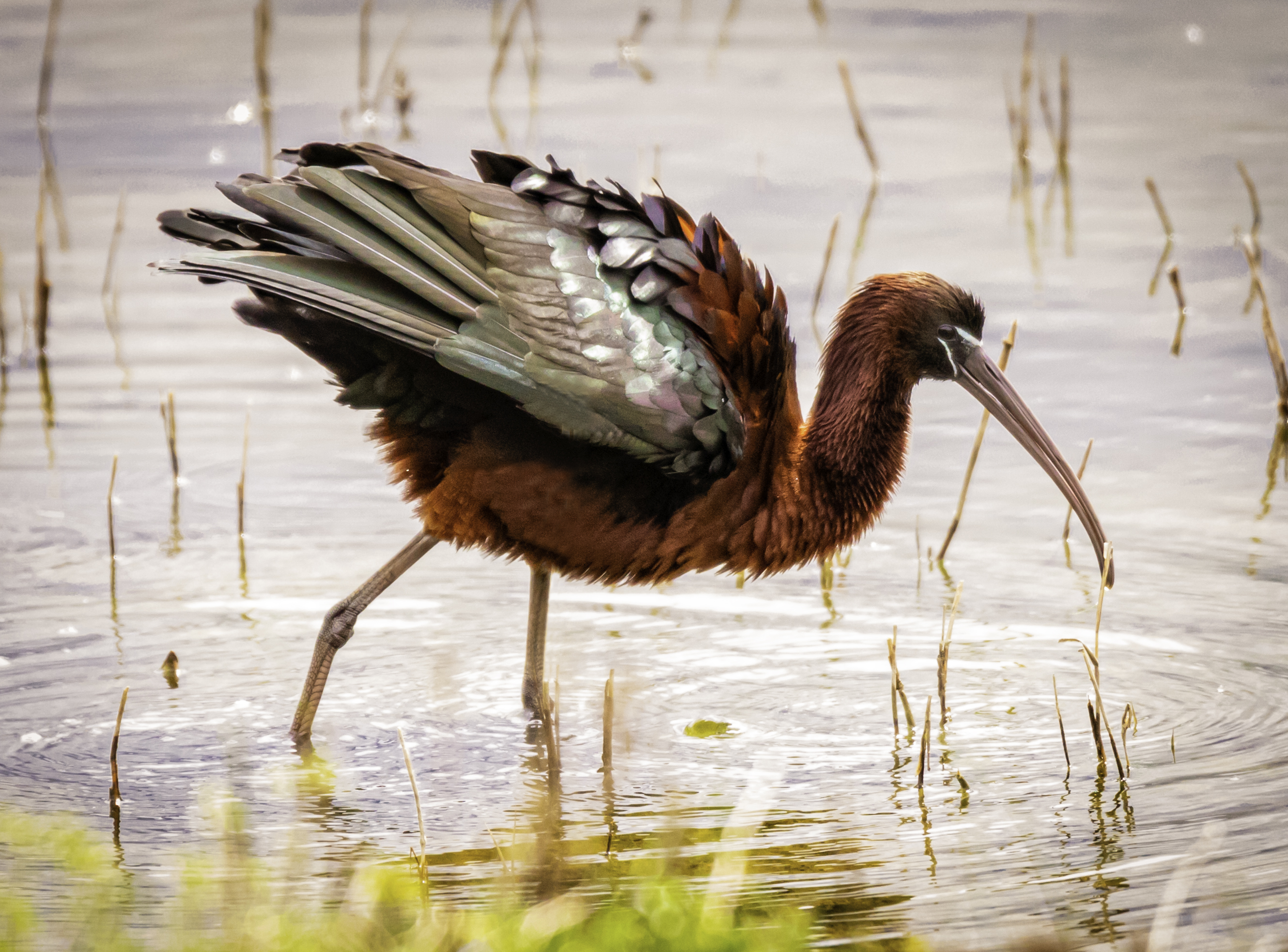
Glossy ibis, Alviano

== Herons, egrets, and bitterns ==
Order: Pelecaniformes Family: Ardeidae

The family Ardeidae contains the bitterns, herons and egrets. Herons and egrets are medium to large wetland birds with long necks and legs. Bitterns tend to be shorter necked and more wary. Members of Ardeidae fly with their necks retracted, unlike other long-necked birds such as storks, ibises and spoonbills.

- Great bittern Botaurus stellaris Tarabuso – A
- Little bittern Botaurus minutus Tarabusino – A
- Schrenck's bittern Botaurus eurhythmus Tarabusino orientale – B
- Black-crowned night heron Nycticorax nycticorax Nitticora – A
- Squacco heron Ardeola ralloides Sgarza ciuffetto – A
- Western cattle egret Ardea ibis Airone guardabuoi – A
- Grey heron Ardea cinerea Airone cenerino – A
- Purple heron Ardea purpurea Airone rosso – A
- Great egret Ardea alba Airone bianco maggiore – A
- Yellow-billed egret Ardea brachyrhyncha Airone bianco intermedio – A
- Black heron Egretta ardesiaca Airone ardesia – A
- Little egret Egretta garzetta Garzetta – A
- Western reef heron Egretta gularis Airone schistaceo – A
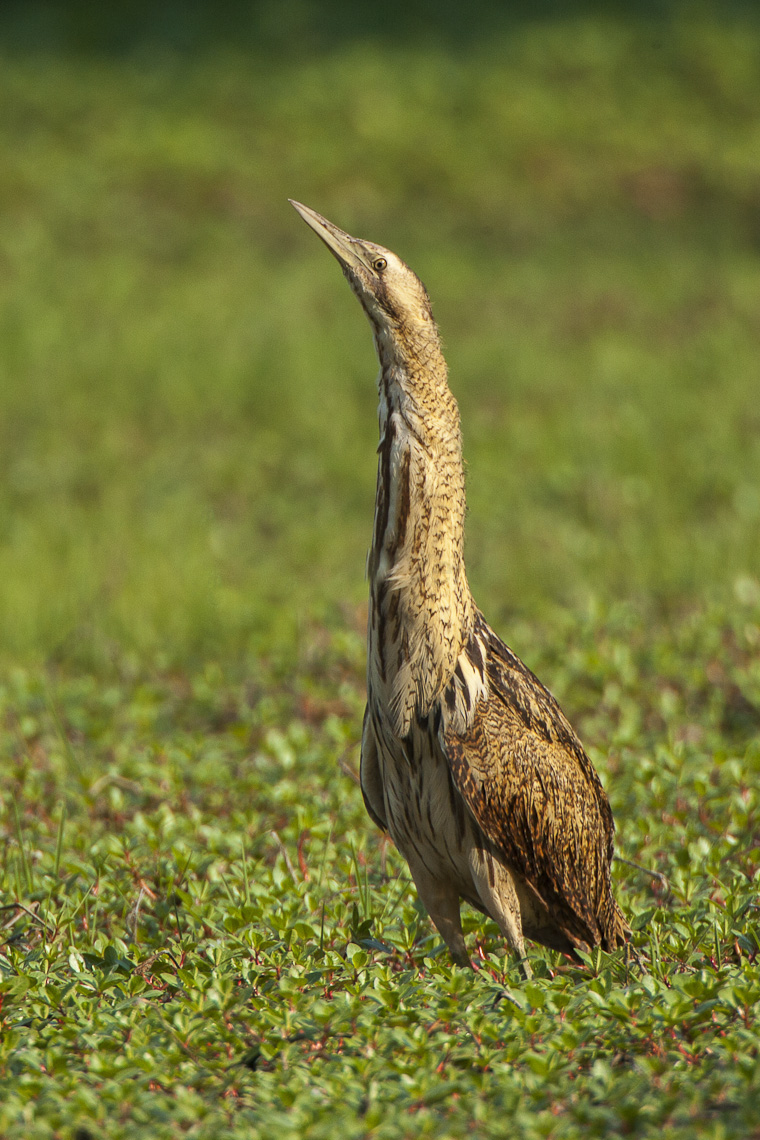
Great bittern, Torrile

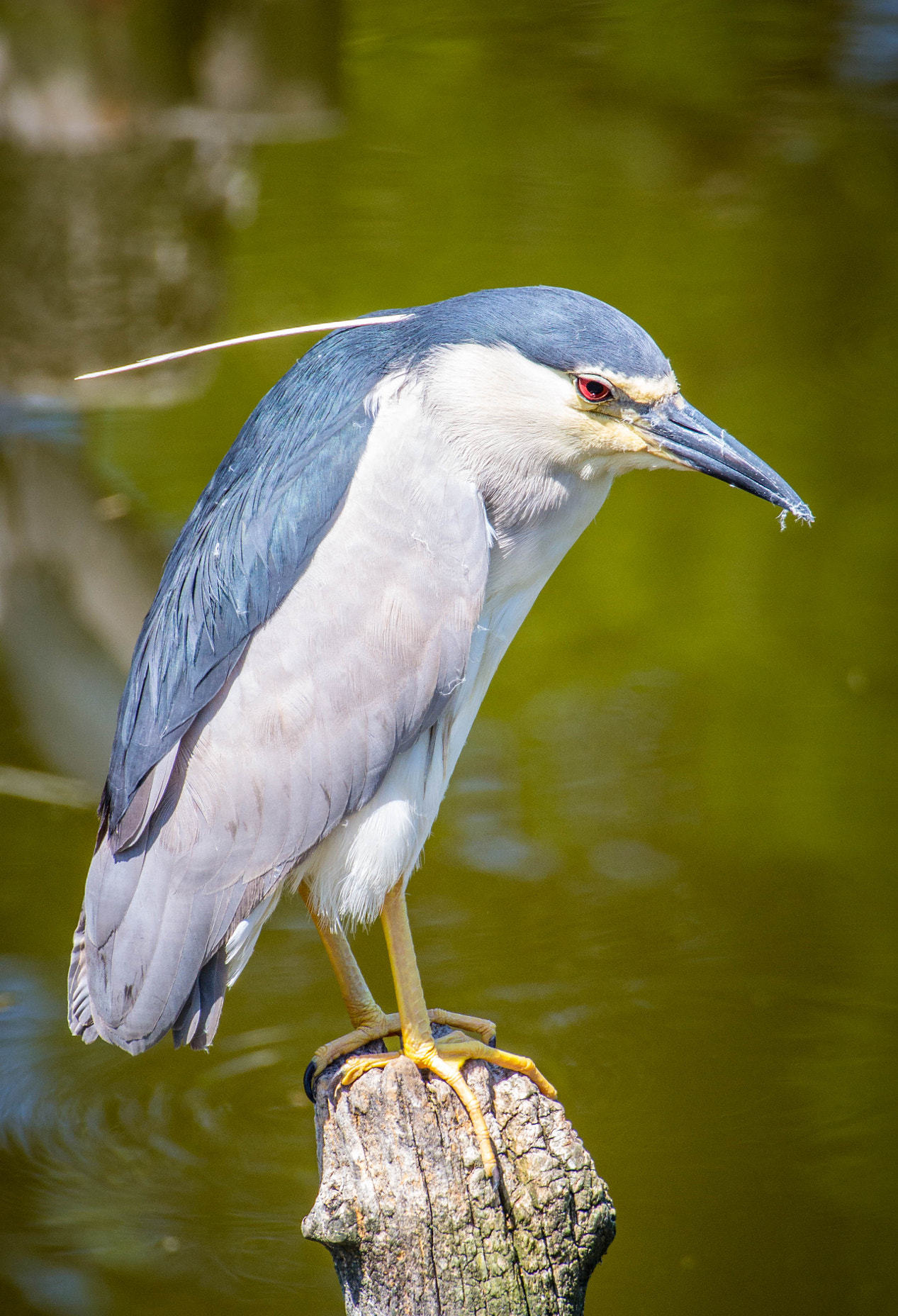
Black-crowned night heron, Lignano Sabbiadoro

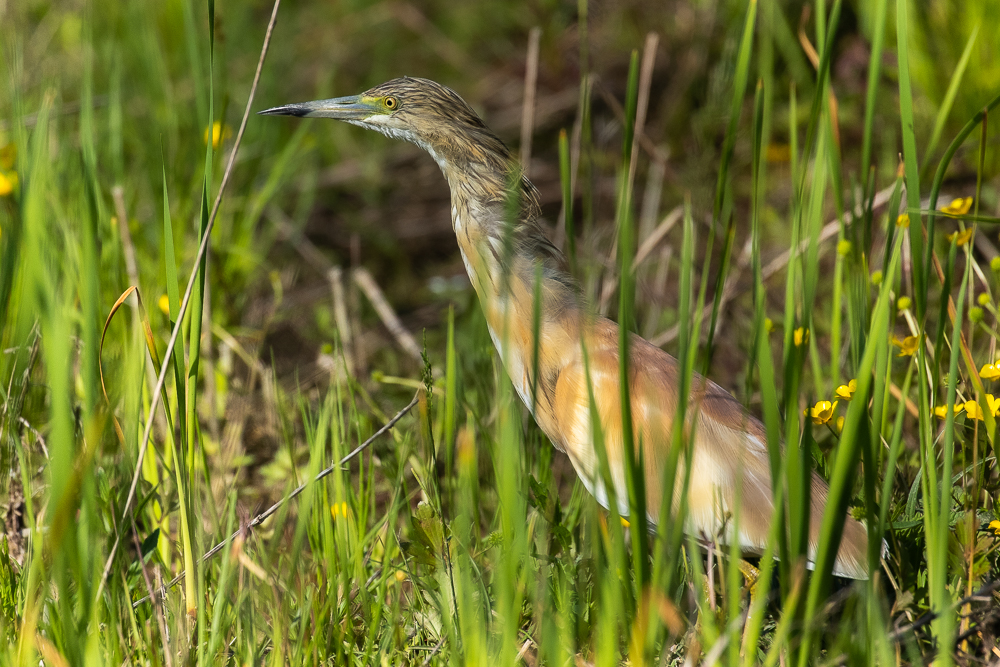
Squacco heron, near Parma

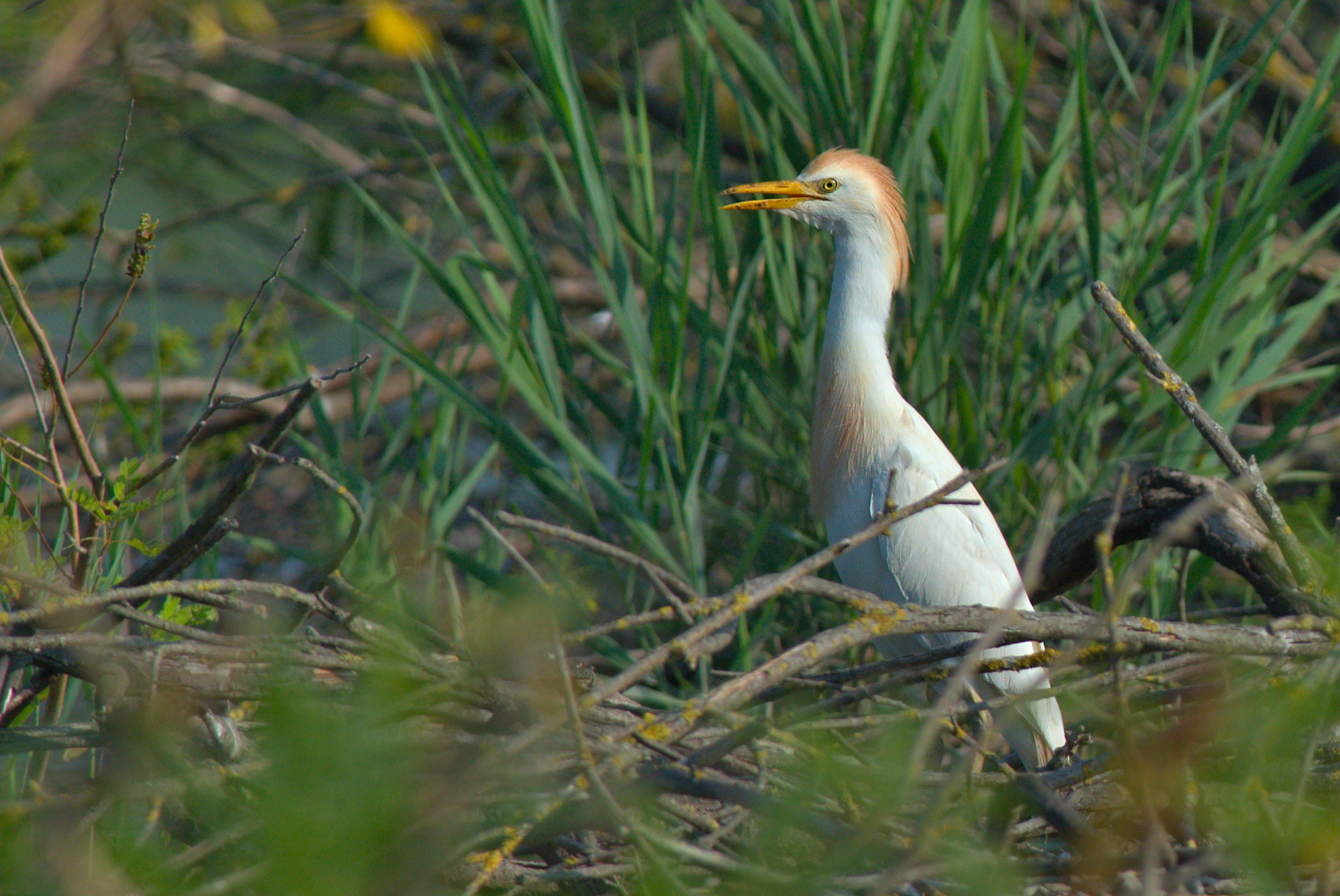
Western cattle egret, Italy

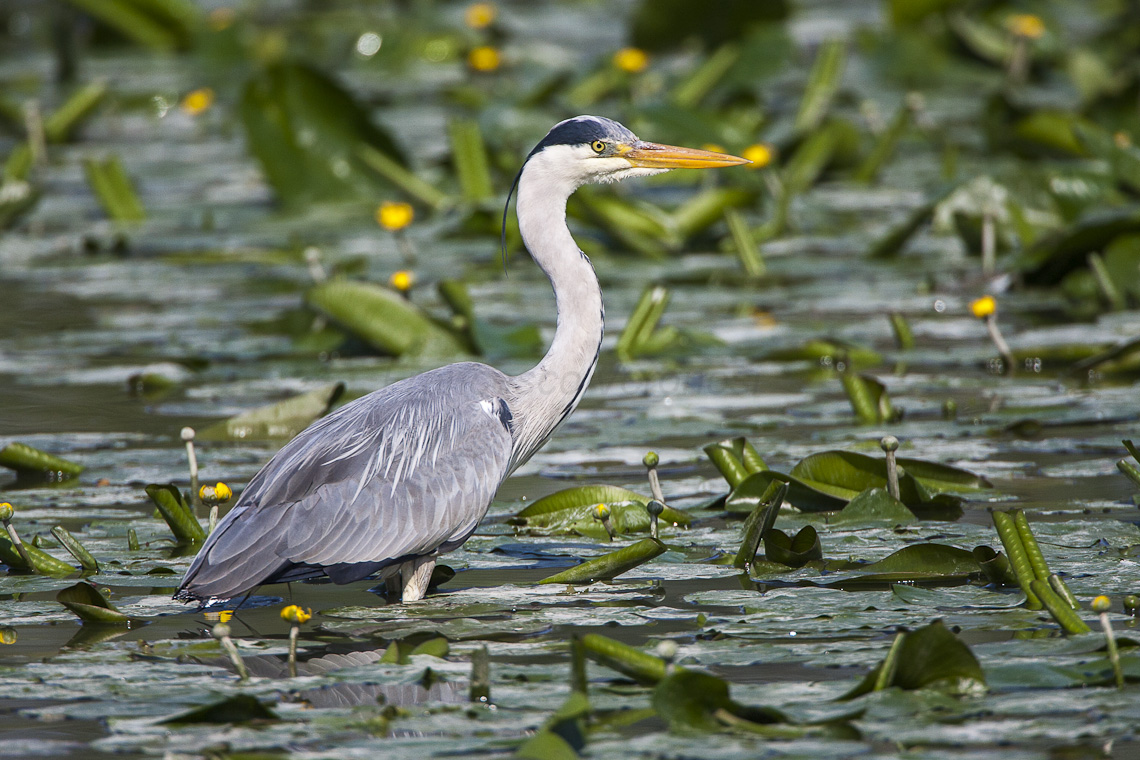
Grey heron, Torrile

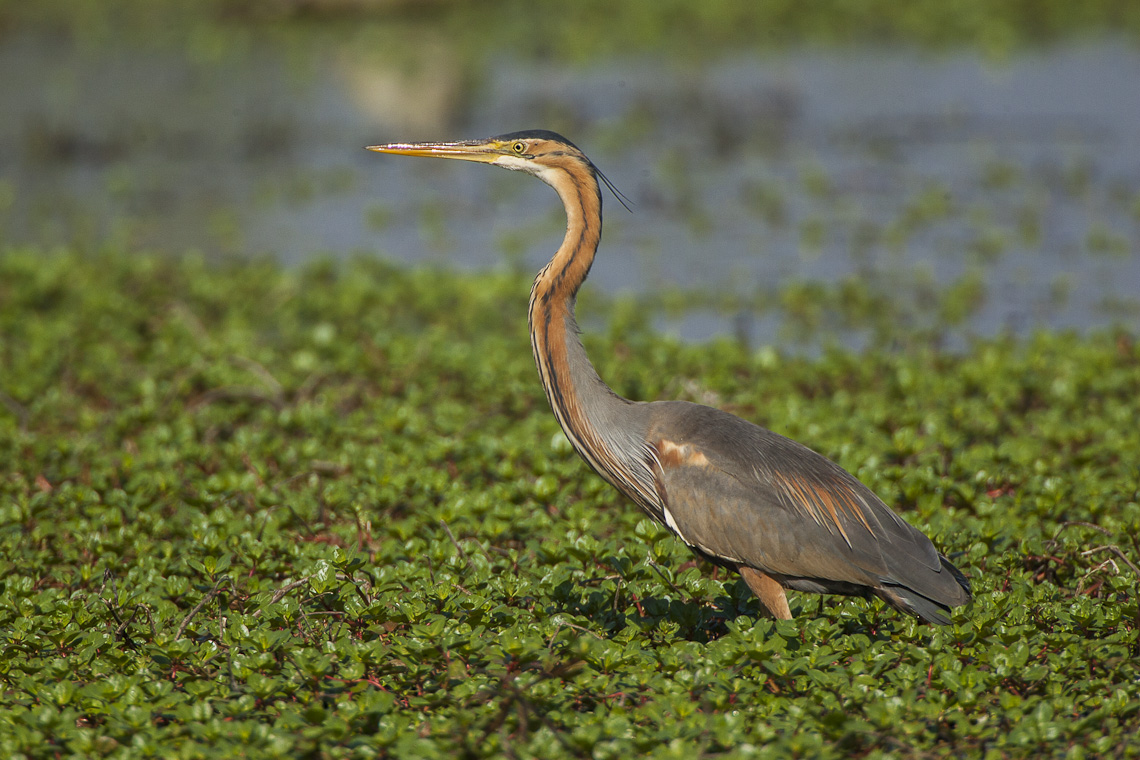
Purple heron, Torrile

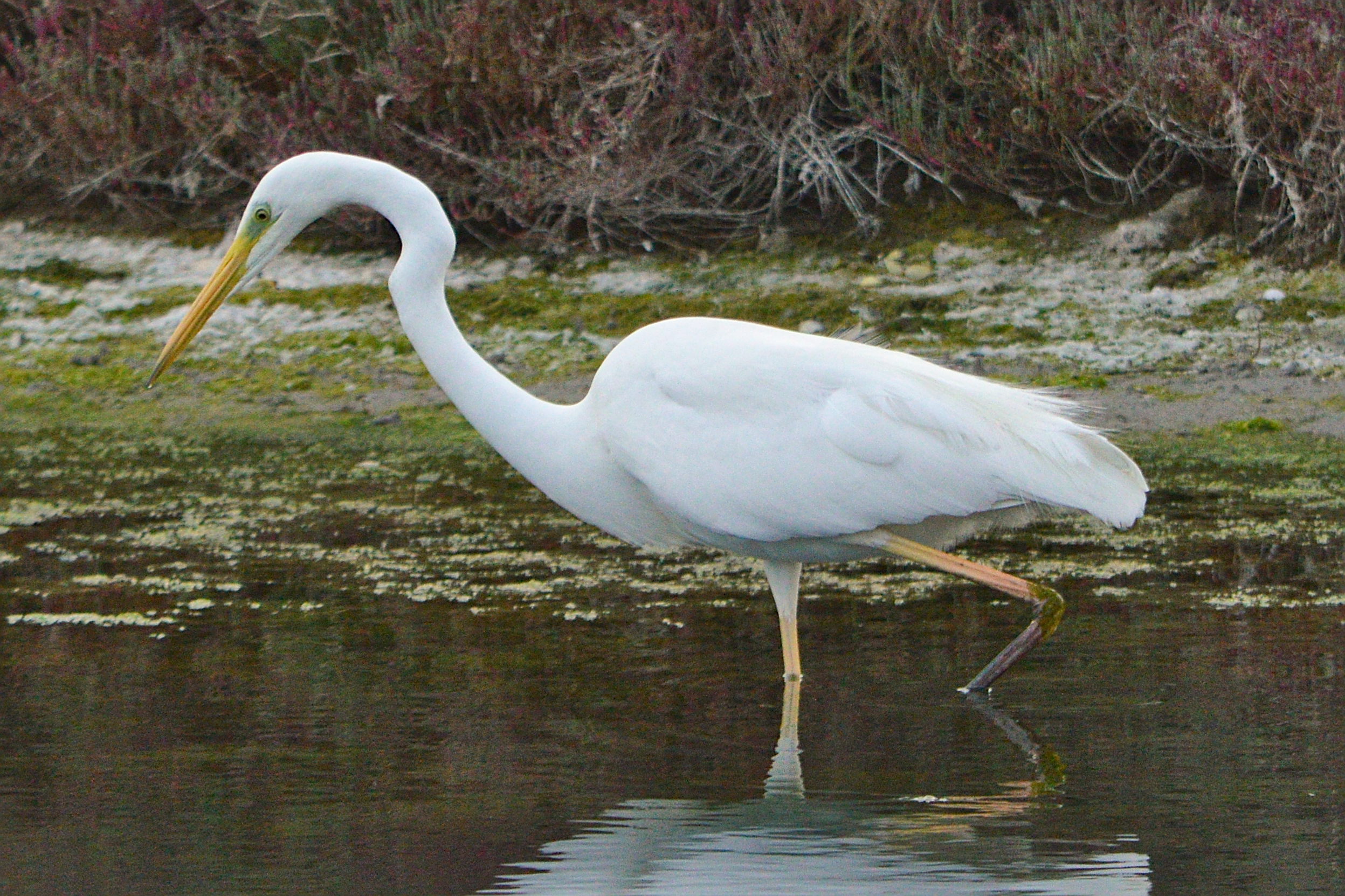
Great egret, Cagliari

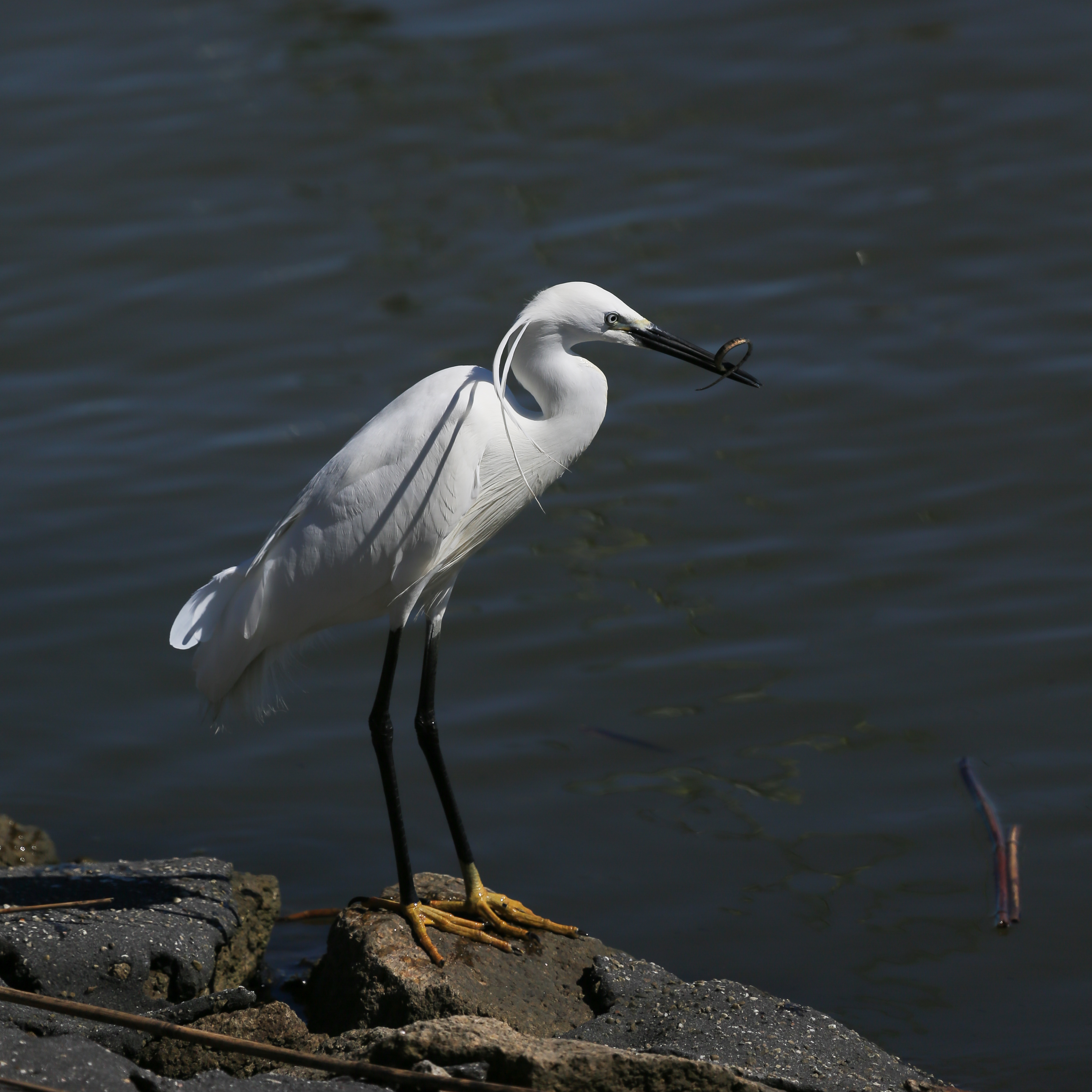
Little egret, Comacchio

== Pelicans ==
Order: Pelecaniformes Family: Pelecanidae

Pelicans are large water birds with a distinctive pouch under their beak. As with other members of the order Pelecaniformes, they have webbed feet with four toes.

- Dalmatian pelican Pelecanus crispus Pellicano riccio – A
- Great white pelican Pelecanus onocrotalus Pellicano comune – A
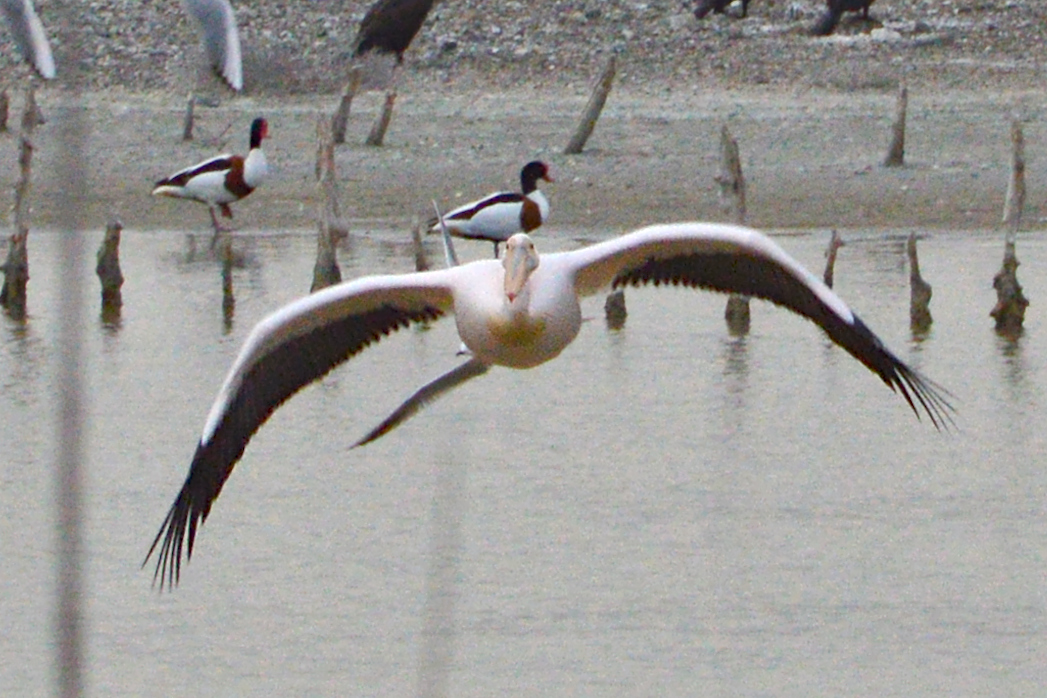
Great white pelican, Cagliari

== Boobies and gannets ==
Order: Suliformes Family: Sulidae

The sulids comprise the gannets and boobies. Both groups are medium to large coastal seabirds that plunge-dive for fish.

- Northern gannet Morus bassanus Sula – A
- Brown booby Sula leucogaster Sula fosca – A

== Cormorants and shags ==
Order: Suliformes Family: Phalacrocoracidae

Phalacrocoracidae is a family of medium to large fish-eating waterbirds that includes cormorants and shags.

- Pygmy cormorant Microcarbo pygmeus Marangone minore – A
- European shag Gulosus aristotelis Marangone dal ciuffo – A
- Great cormorant Phalacrocorax carbo Cormorano – A
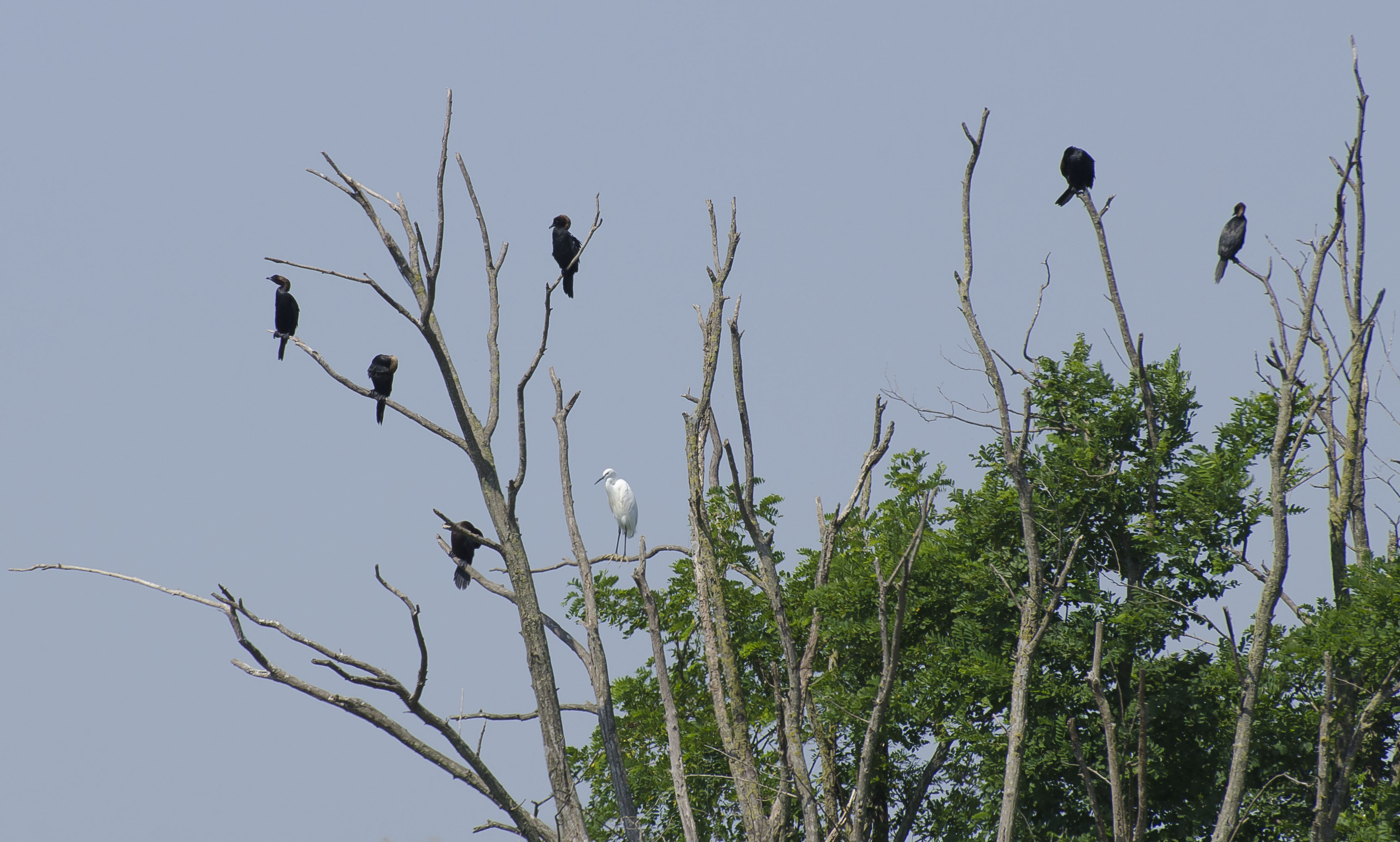
Pygmy cormorants and little egret, Venetian Lagoon

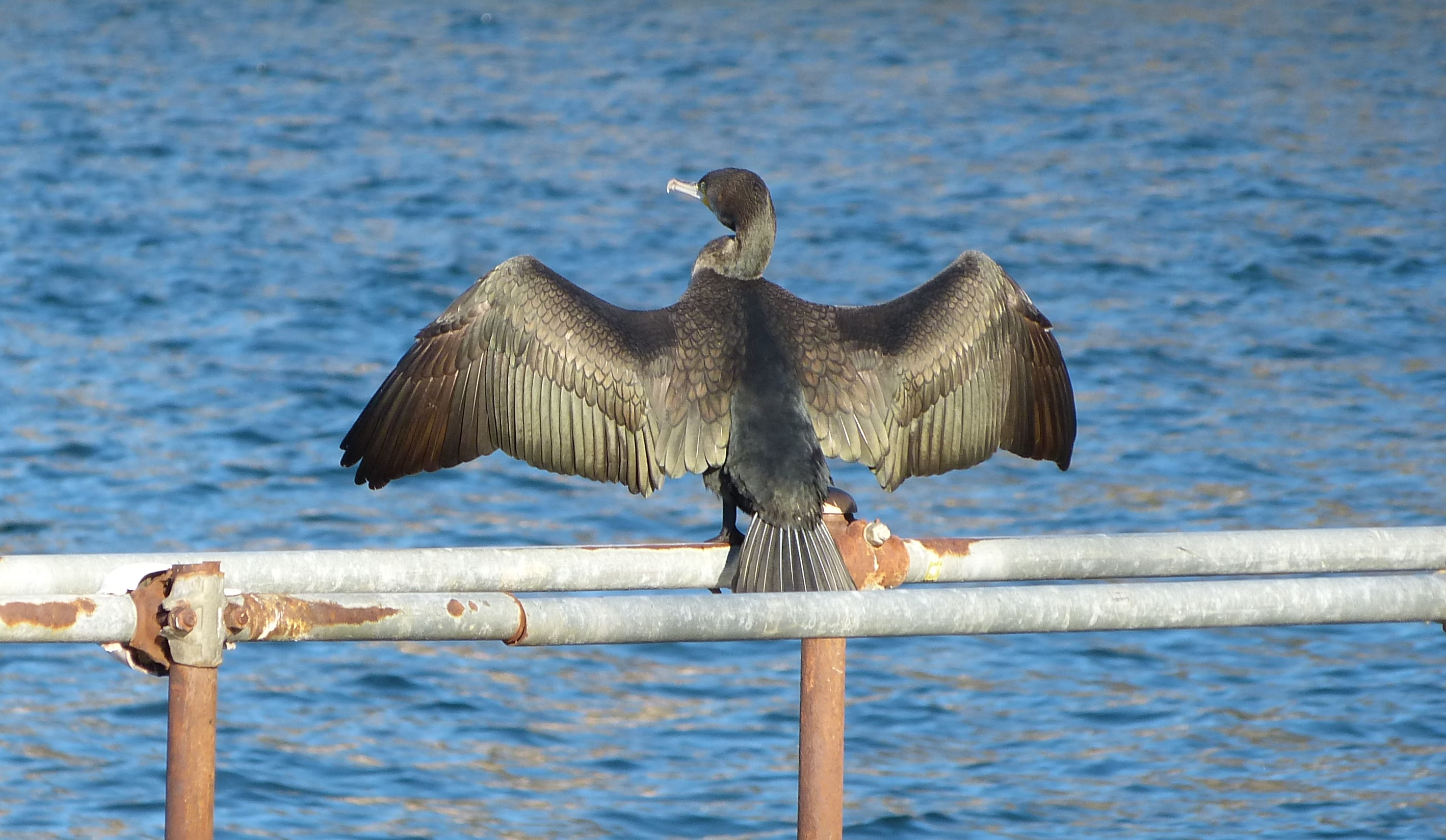
Great cormorant, Lake Como, Lombardy

== Thick-knees ==
Order: Charadriiformes Family: Burhinidae

The thick-knees are a group of largely tropical waders in the family Burhinidae. They are found worldwide within the tropical zone, with some species also breeding in temperate Europe and Australia. They are medium to large waders with strong black or yellow-black bills, large yellow eyes and cryptic plumage. Despite being classed as waders, most species have a preference for arid or semi-arid habitats.

- Eurasian thick-knee Burhinus oedicnemus Occhione – A
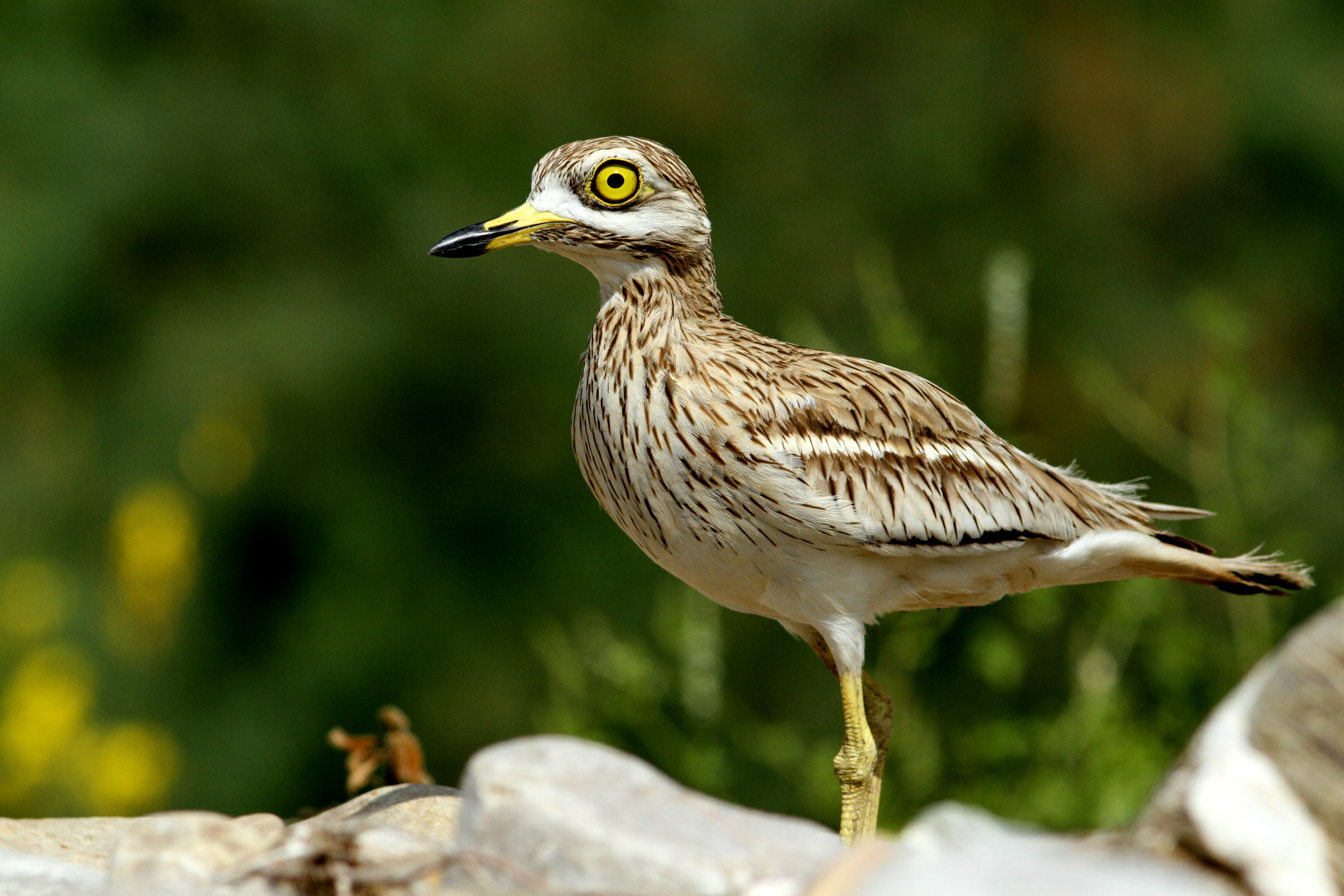
Eurasian thick-knee, Lazio

== Oystercatchers ==
Order: Charadriiformes Family: Haematopodidae

The oystercatchers are large and noisy plover-like birds, with strong bills used for smashing or prising open molluscs.

- Eurasian oystercatcher Haematopus ostralegus Beccaccia di mare – A
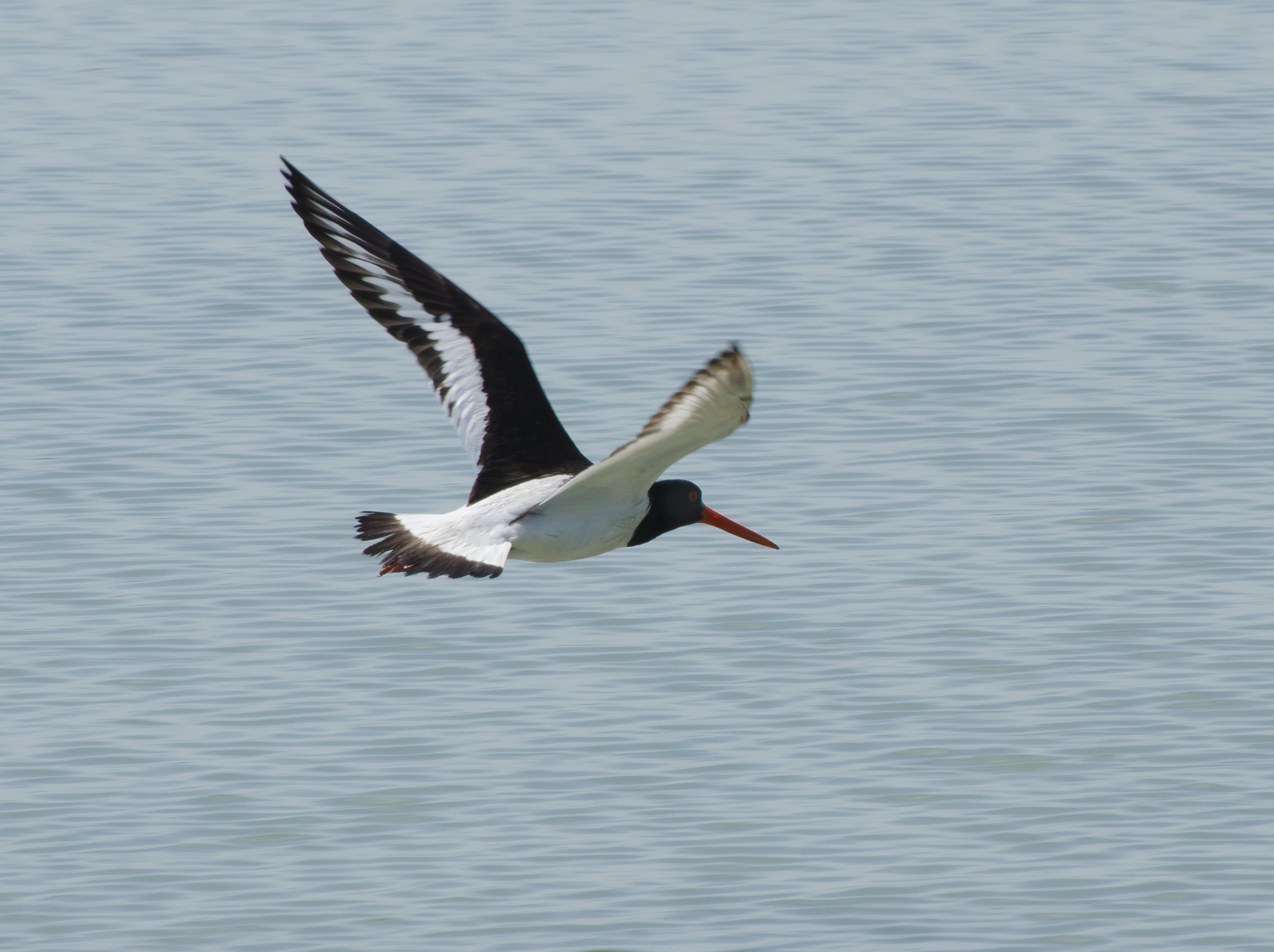
Eurasian oystercatcher, Venetian Lagoon

== Stilts and avocets ==
Order: Charadriiformes Family: Recurvirostridae

Recurvirostridae is a family of large wading birds, which includes the avocets and stilts. The avocets have long legs and long up-curved bills. The stilts have extremely long legs and long, thin, straight bills.

- Pied avocet Recurvirostra avosetta Avocetta – A
- Black-winged stilt Himantopus himantopus Cavaliere d'Italia – A
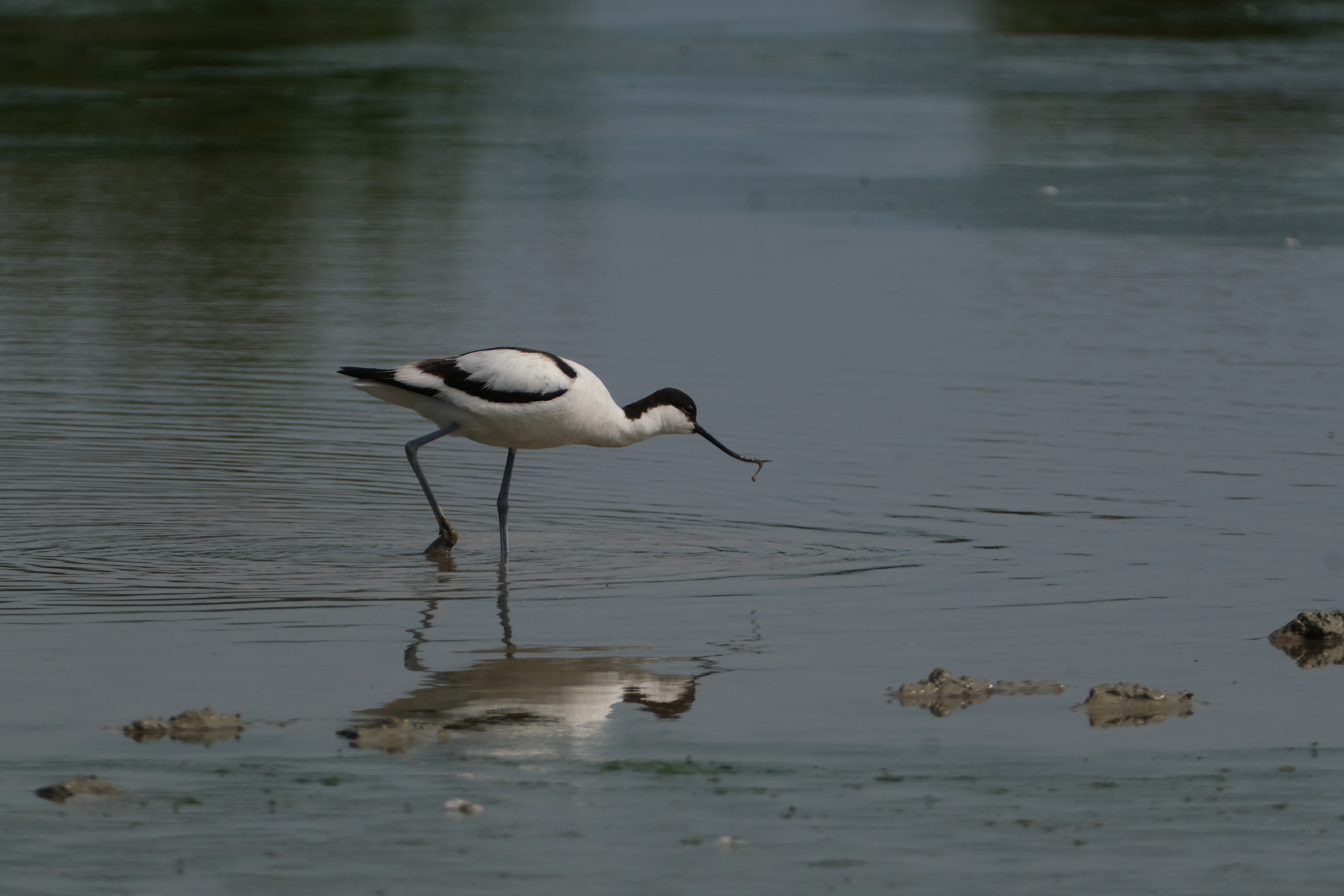
Pied avocet, Friuli-Venezia Giulia

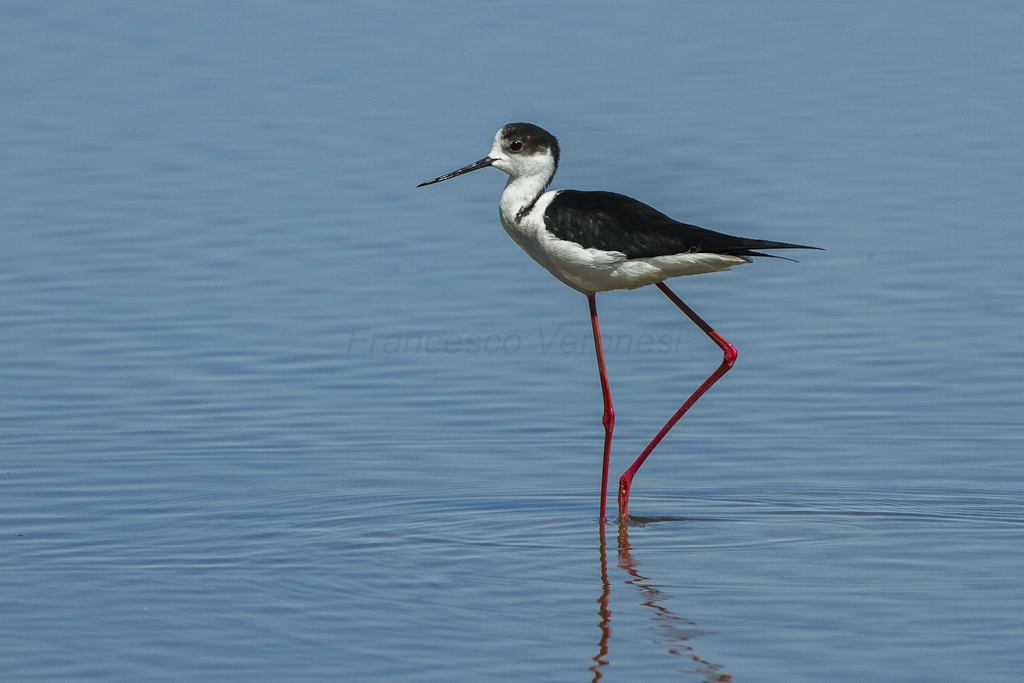
Black-winged stilt, Italy

== Plovers and lapwings ==
Order: Charadriiformes Family: Charadriidae

The family Charadriidae includes the plovers, dotterels and lapwings. They are small to medium-sized birds with compact bodies, short, thick necks and long, usually pointed, wings. They are found in open country worldwide, mostly in habitats near water.

- Grey plover Pluvialis squatarola Pivieressa – A
- European golden plover Pluvialis apricaria Piviere dorato – A
- Pacific golden plover Pluvialis fulva Piviere orientale – A
- American golden plover Pluvialis dominica Piviere americano – A
- Eurasian dotterel Eudromias morinellus Piviere tortolino – A
- Common ringed plover Charadrius hiaticula Corriere grosso – A
- Little ringed plover Charadrius dubius Corriere piccolo – A
- Kittlitz's plover Anarhynchus pecuarius Corriere di Kittlitz – B
- Kentish plover Anarhynchus alexandrinus Fratino – A
- Lesser sand plover Anarhynchus mongolus Corriere mongolo – A
- Greater sand plover Anarhynchus leschenaultii Corriere di Leschenault – A
- Caspian plover Anarhynchus asiaticus Corriere asiatico – A
- Northern lapwing Vanellus vanellus Pavoncella – A
- Spur-winged lapwing Vanellus spinosus Pavoncella armata – A
- Sociable lapwing Vanellus gregarius Pavoncella gregaria – A
- White-tailed lapwing Vanellus leucurus Pavoncella codabianca – A
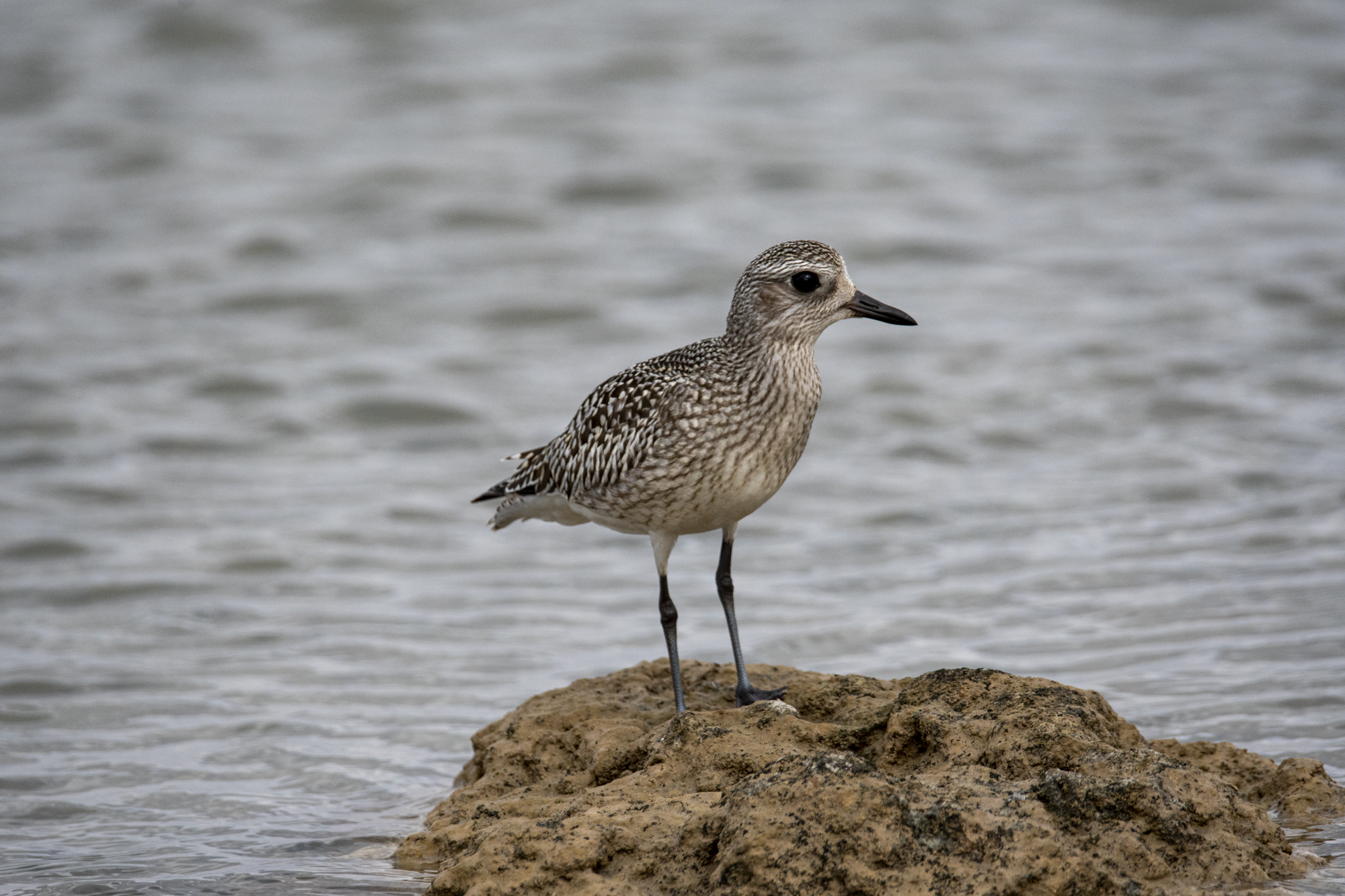
Grey plover, Porto Cesareo, Apulia

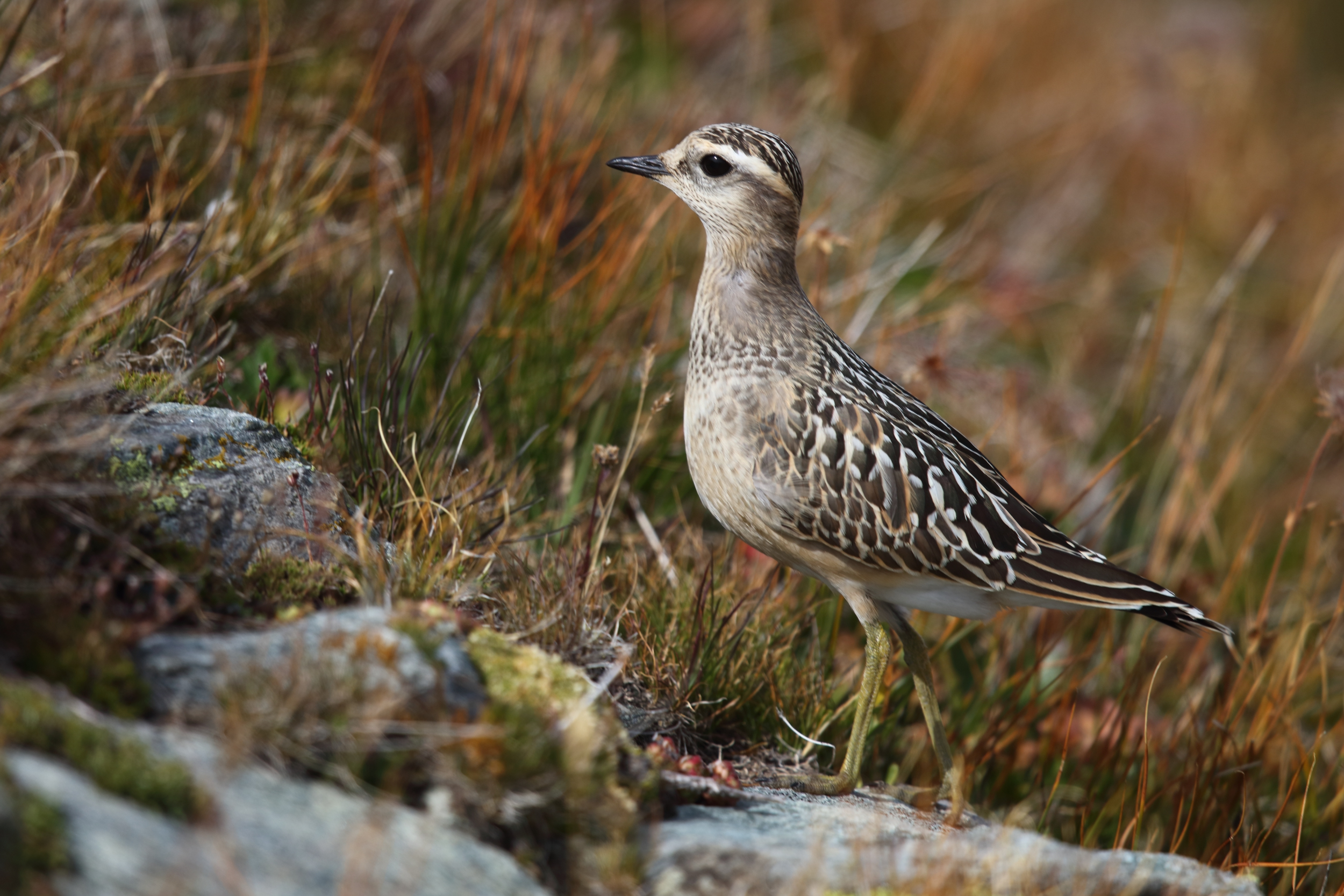
Eurasian dotterel, Gran Paradiso National Park, Graian Alps

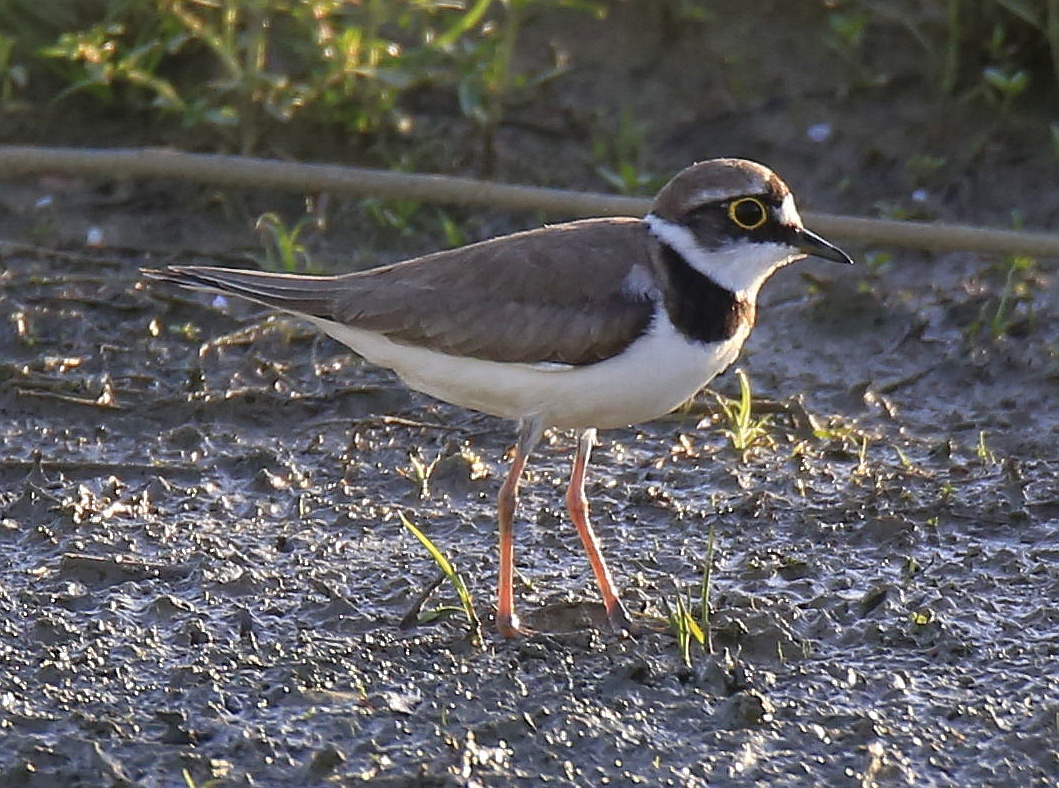
Little ringed plover, Florence

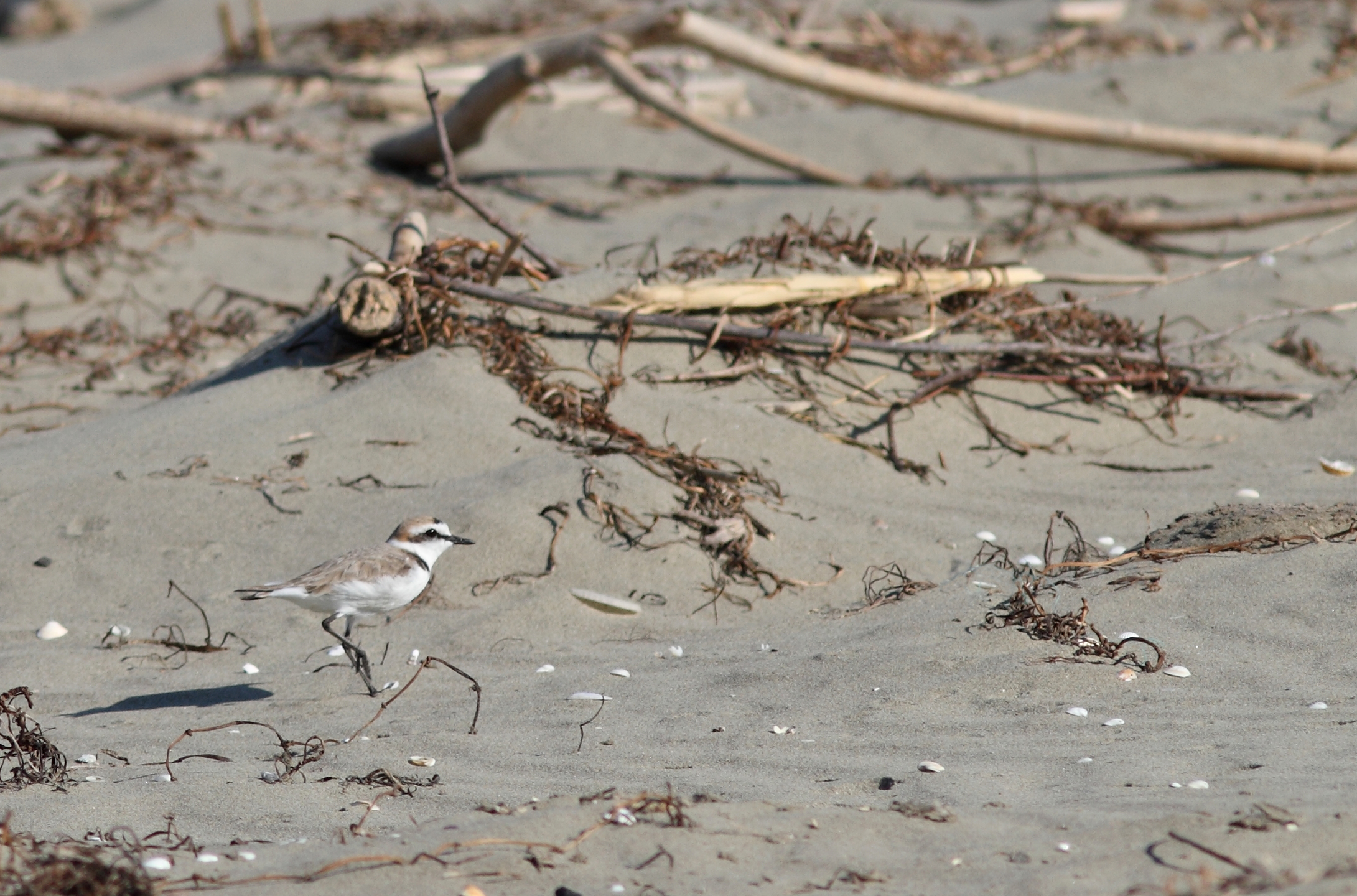
Kentish plover, Maremma Regional Park, Tuscany

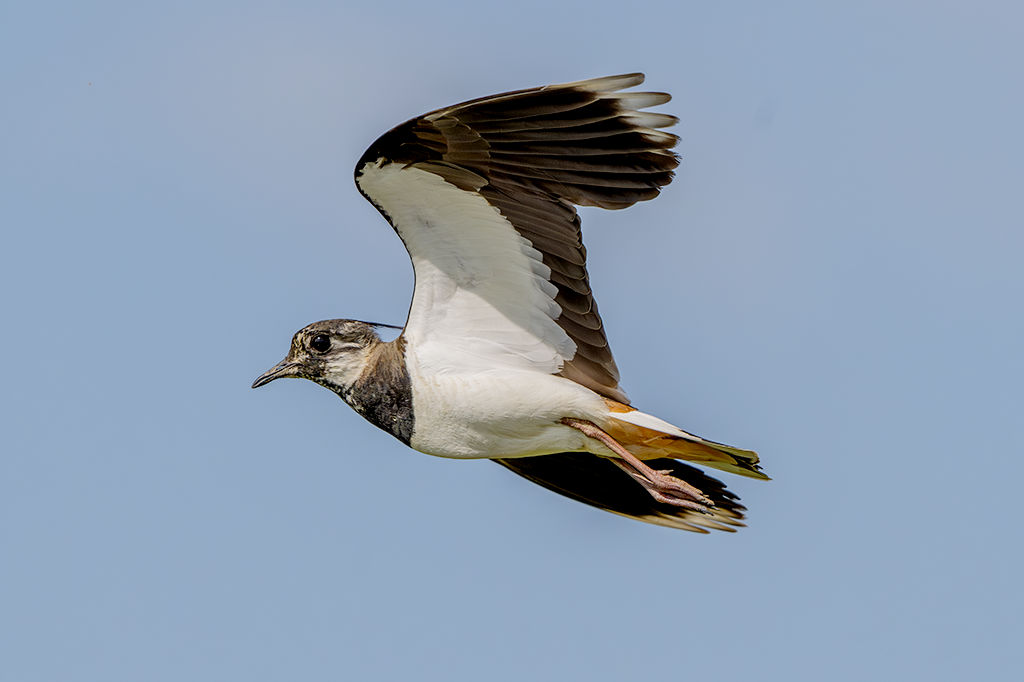
Northern lapwing, Casalbeltrame, Piedmont

== Sandpipers and allies ==
Order: Charadriiformes Family: Scolopacidae

Scolopacidae is a large diverse family of small to medium-sized shorebirds including the sandpipers, curlew, godwits, shanks, woodcock, snipe, dowitchers and phalaropes. The majority of these species eat small invertebrates picked out of the mud or soil. Variation in length of legs and bills enables multiple species to feed in the same habitat, particularly on the coast, without direct competition for food.

- Upland sandpiper Bartramia longicauda Piro piro codalunga – A
- Eurasian whimbrel Numenius phaeopus Chiurlo piccolo – A
- Slender-billed curlew Numenius tenuirostris Chiurlottello – A
- Eurasian curlew Numenius arquata Chiurlo maggiore – A
- Bar-tailed godwit Limosa lapponica Pittima minore – A
- Black-tailed godwit Limosa limosa Pittima reale – A
- Ruddy turnstone Arenaria interpres Voltapietre – A
- Red knot Calidris canutus Piovanello maggiore – A
- Ruff Calidris pugnax Combattente – A
- Broad-billed sandpiper Calidris falcinellus Gambecchio frullino – A
- Curlew sandpiper Calidris ferruginea Piovanello comune – A
- Temminck's stint Calidris temminckii Gambecchio nano – A
- Red-necked stint Calidris ruficollis Gambecchio collorosso – A
- Sanderling Calidris alba Piovanello tridattilo – A
- Dunlin Calidris alpina Piovanello pancianera – A
- Purple sandpiper Calidris maritima Piovanello violetto – A
- Baird's sandpiper Calidris bairdii Gambecchio di Baird – A
- Little stint Calidris minuta Gambecchio comune – A
- Least sandpiper Calidris minutilla Gambecchio americano – A
- White-rumped sandpiper Calidris fuscicollis Gambecchio di Bonaparte – A
- Buff-breasted sandpiper Calidris subruficollis Piro piro fulvo – A
- Pectoral sandpiper Calidris melanotos Piovanello pettorale – A
- Long-billed dowitcher Limnodromus scolopaceus Limnodromo pettorossiccio – A
- Eurasian woodcock Scolopax rusticola Beccaccia – A
- Pin-tailed snipe Gallinago stenura Beccaccino stenuro – A
- Great snipe Gallinago media Croccolone – A
- Common snipe Gallinago gallinago Beccaccino – A
- Jack snipe Lymnocryptes minimus Frullino – A
- Wilson's phalarope Phalaropus tricolor Falaropo di Wilson – A
- Red-necked phalarope Phalaropus lobatus Falaropo beccosottile – A
- Red phalarope Phalaropus fulicarius Falaropo beccolargo – A
- Terek sandpiper Xenus cinereus Piro piro del Terek – A
- Common sandpiper Actitis hypoleucos Piro piro piccolo – A
- Spotted sandpiper Actitis macularius Piro piro macchiato – A
- Green sandpiper Tringa ochropus Piro piro culbianco – A
- Willet Tringa semipalmata Piro piro semipalmato – A
- Lesser yellowlegs Tringa flavipes Totano zampegialle minore – A
- Spotted redshank Tringa erythropus Totano moro – A
- Common greenshank Tringa nebularia Pantana – A
- Common redshank Tringa totanus Pettegola – A
- Wood sandpiper Tringa glareola Piro piro boschereccio – A
- Marsh sandpiper Tringa stagnatilis Albastrello – A
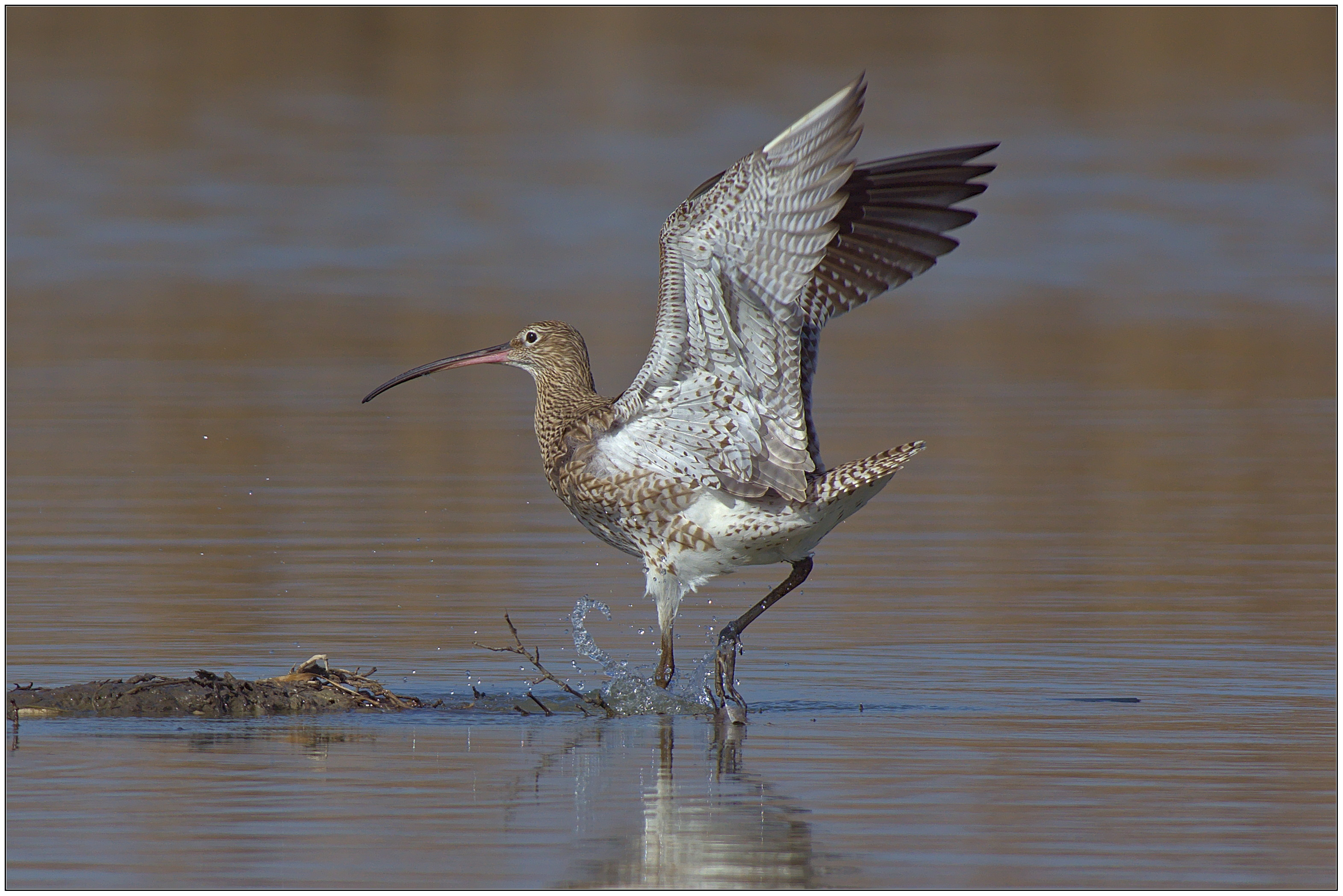
Eurasian whimbrel, Italy

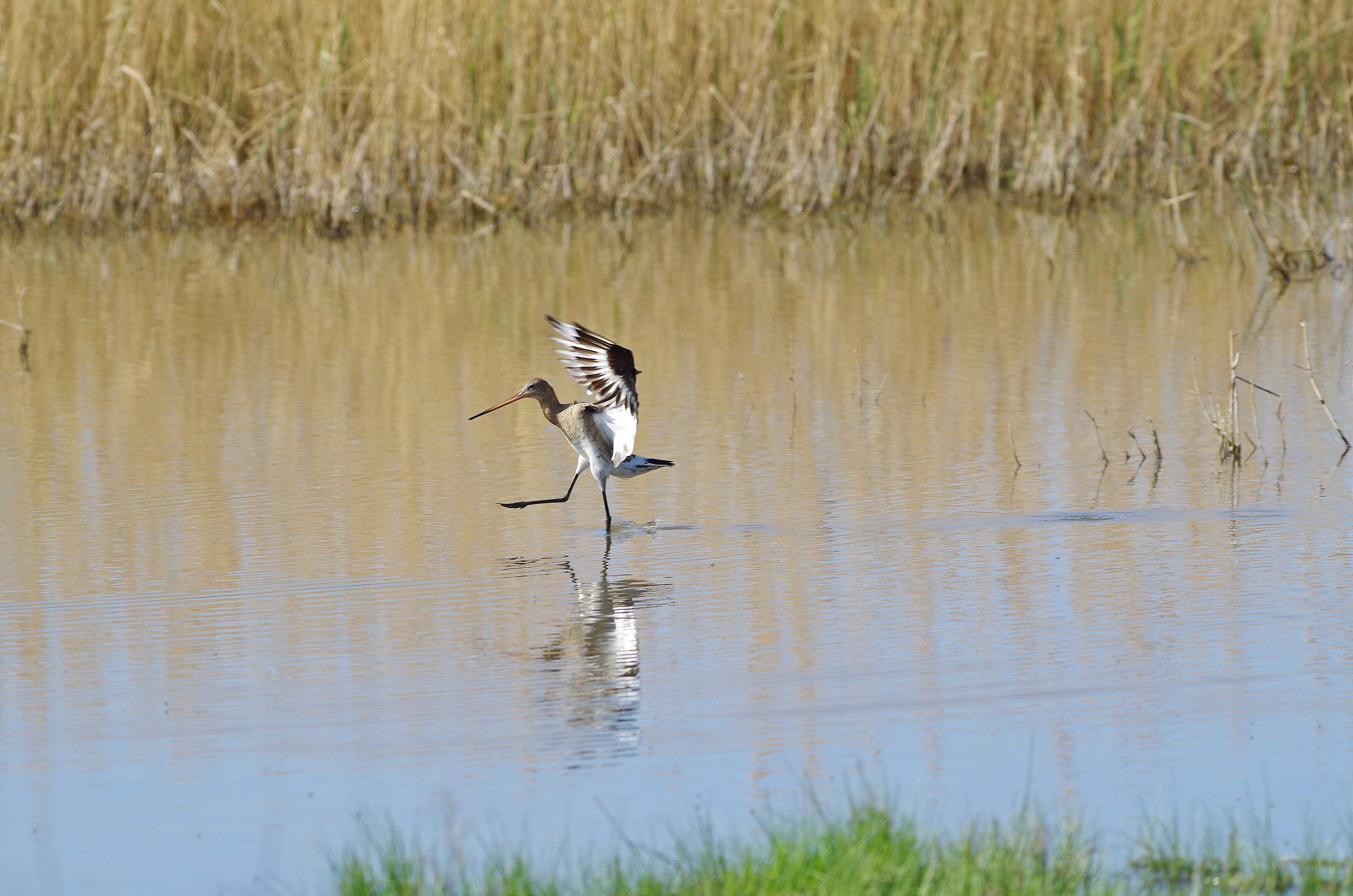
Black tailed godwit, Riserva naturale di Torre Flavia, Ladispoli

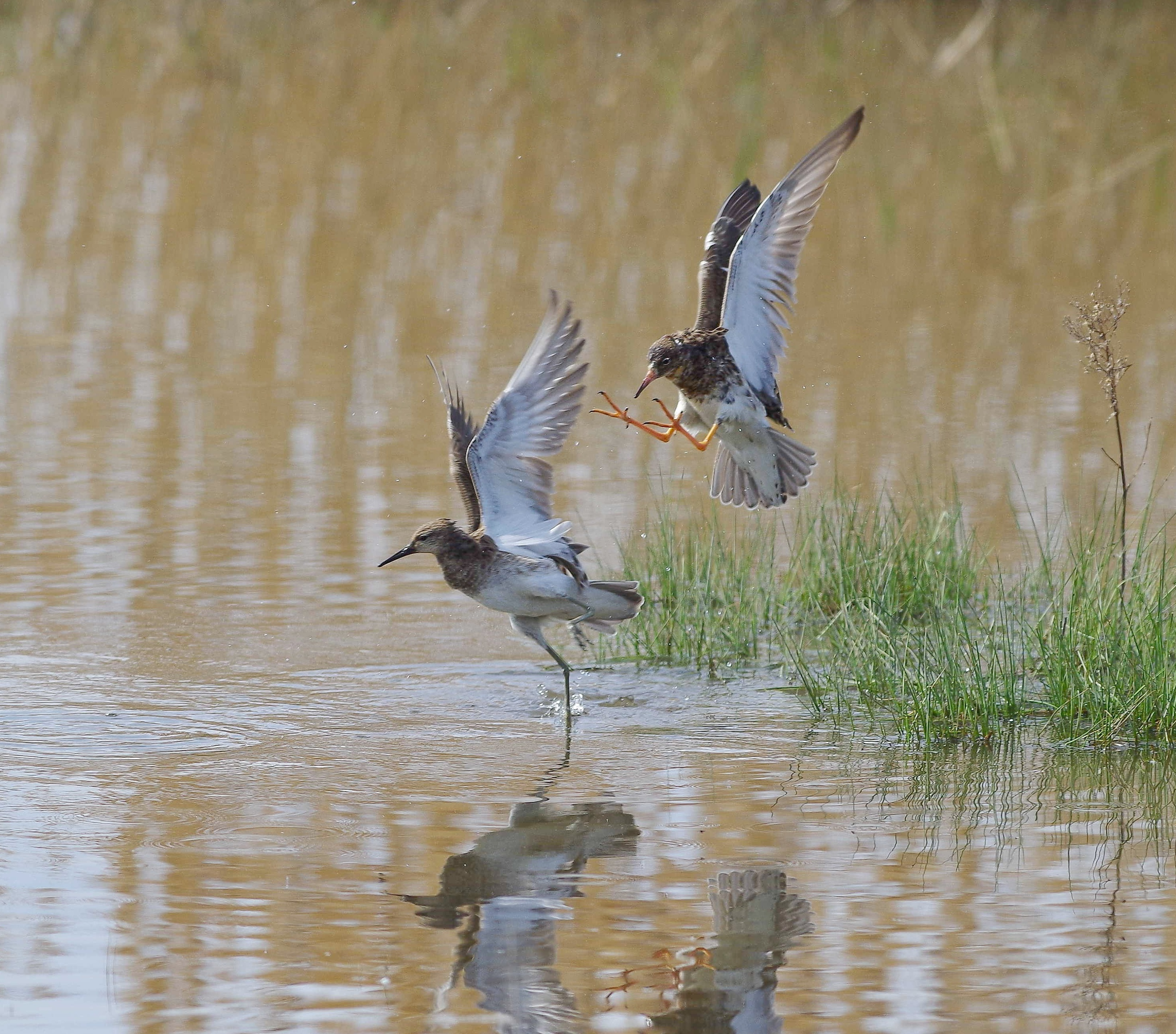
Ruff, Riserva naturale di Torre Flavia, Ladispoli

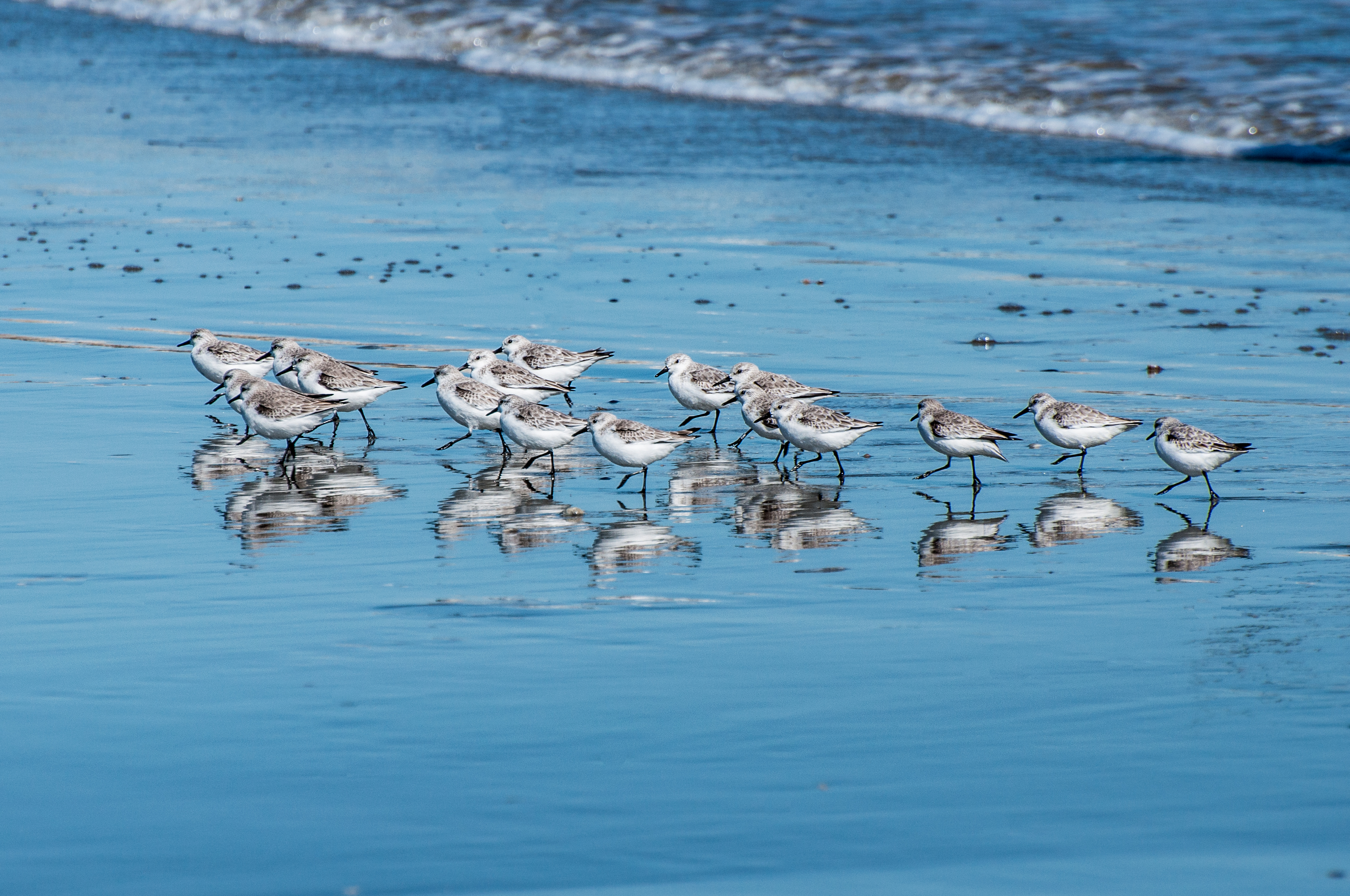
Sanderlings, Italy

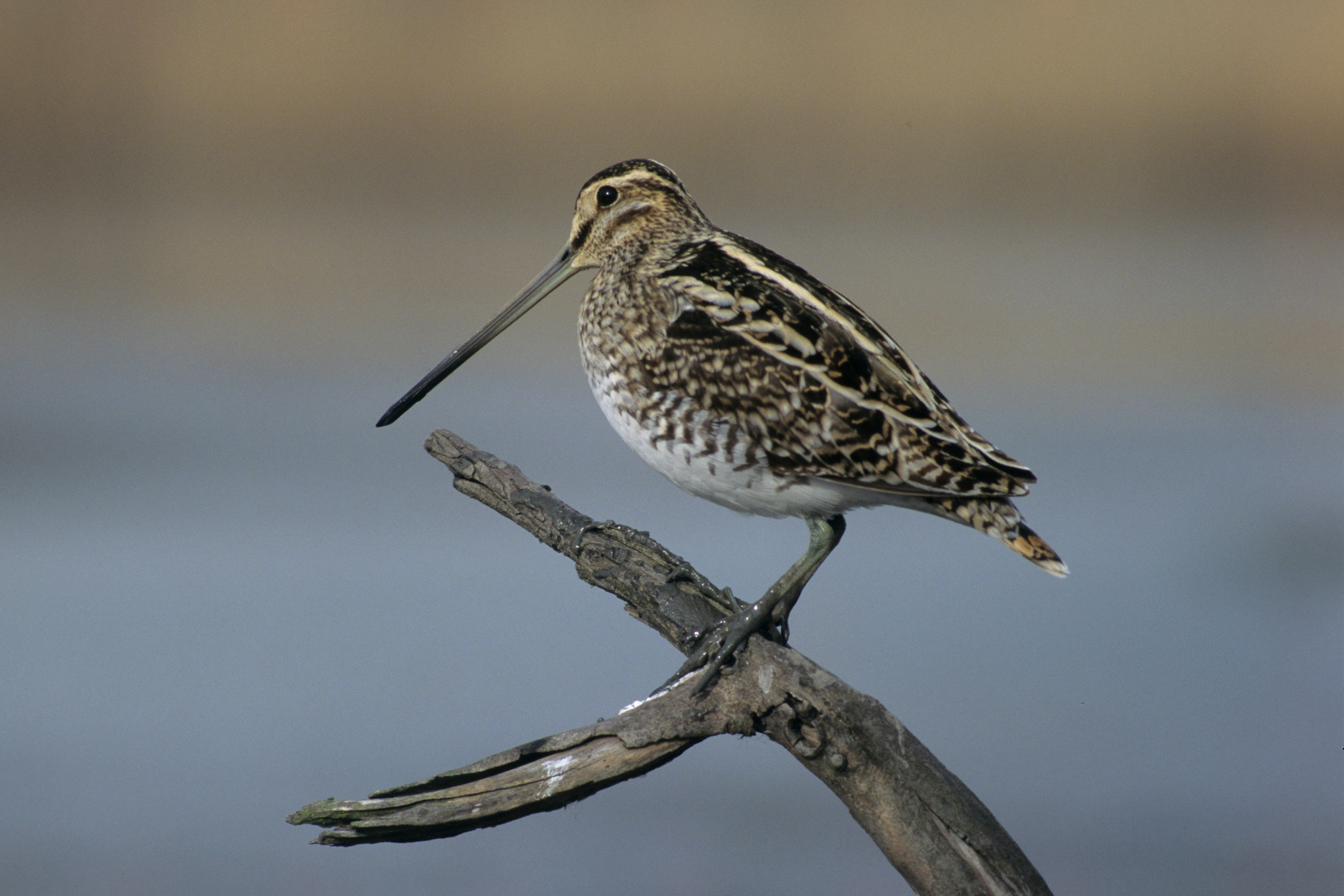
Common snipe, Litorale Romano State Nature Reserve, Fiumicino

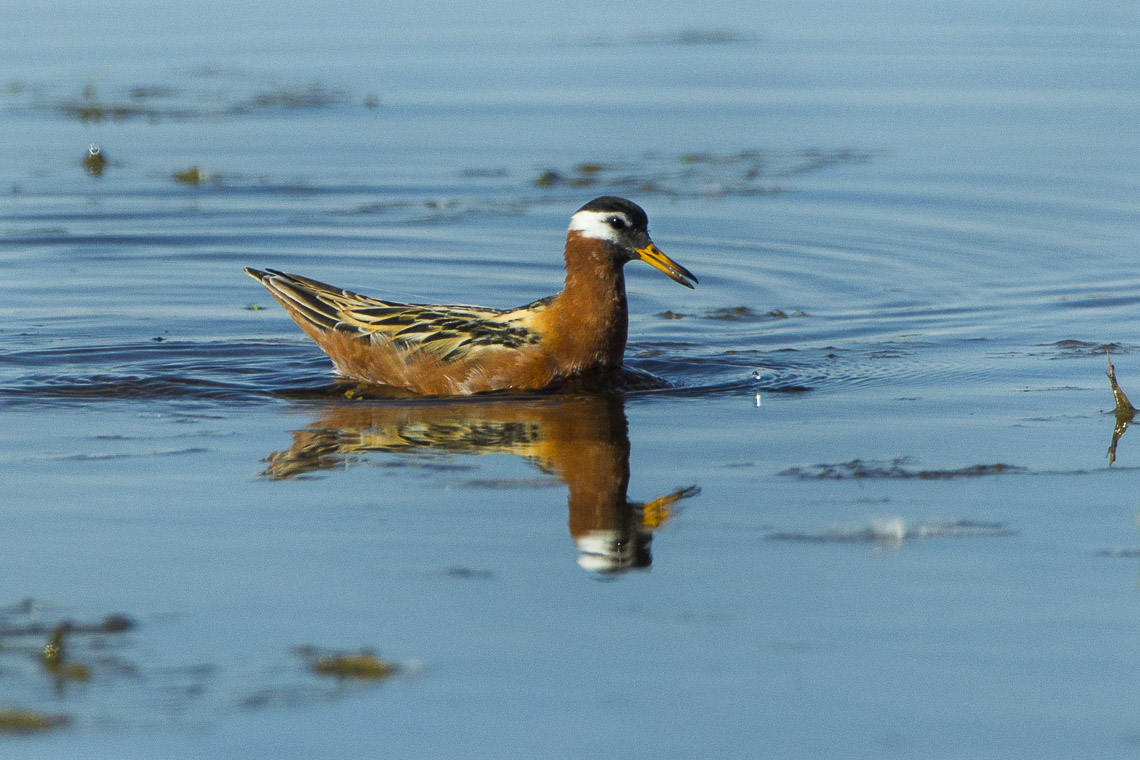
Red phalarope, Vercelli

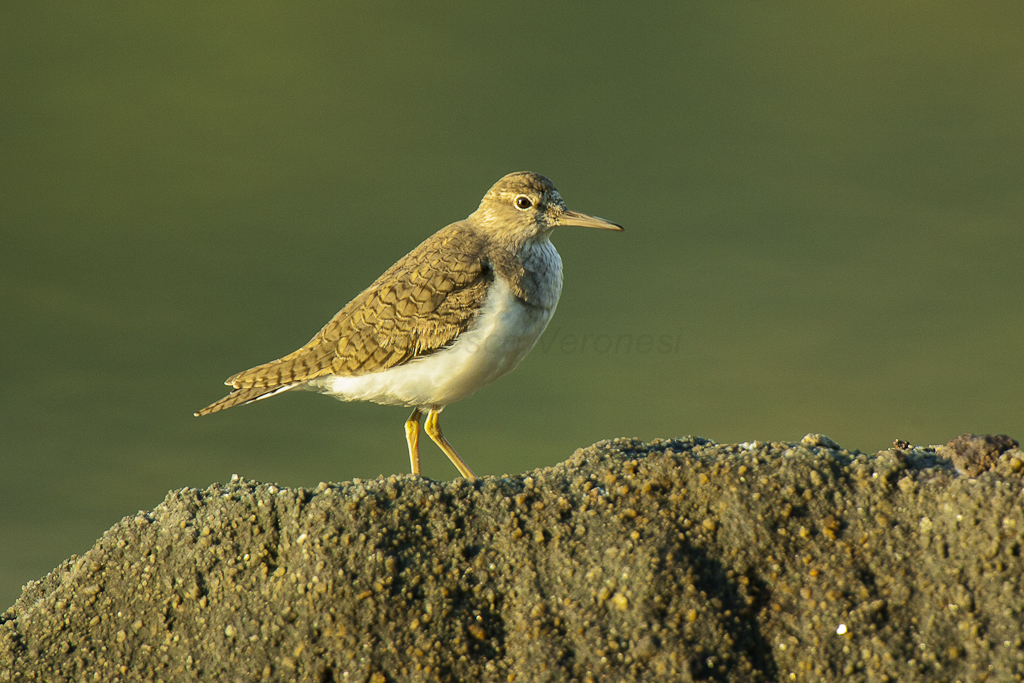
Common sandpiper, Pantelleria

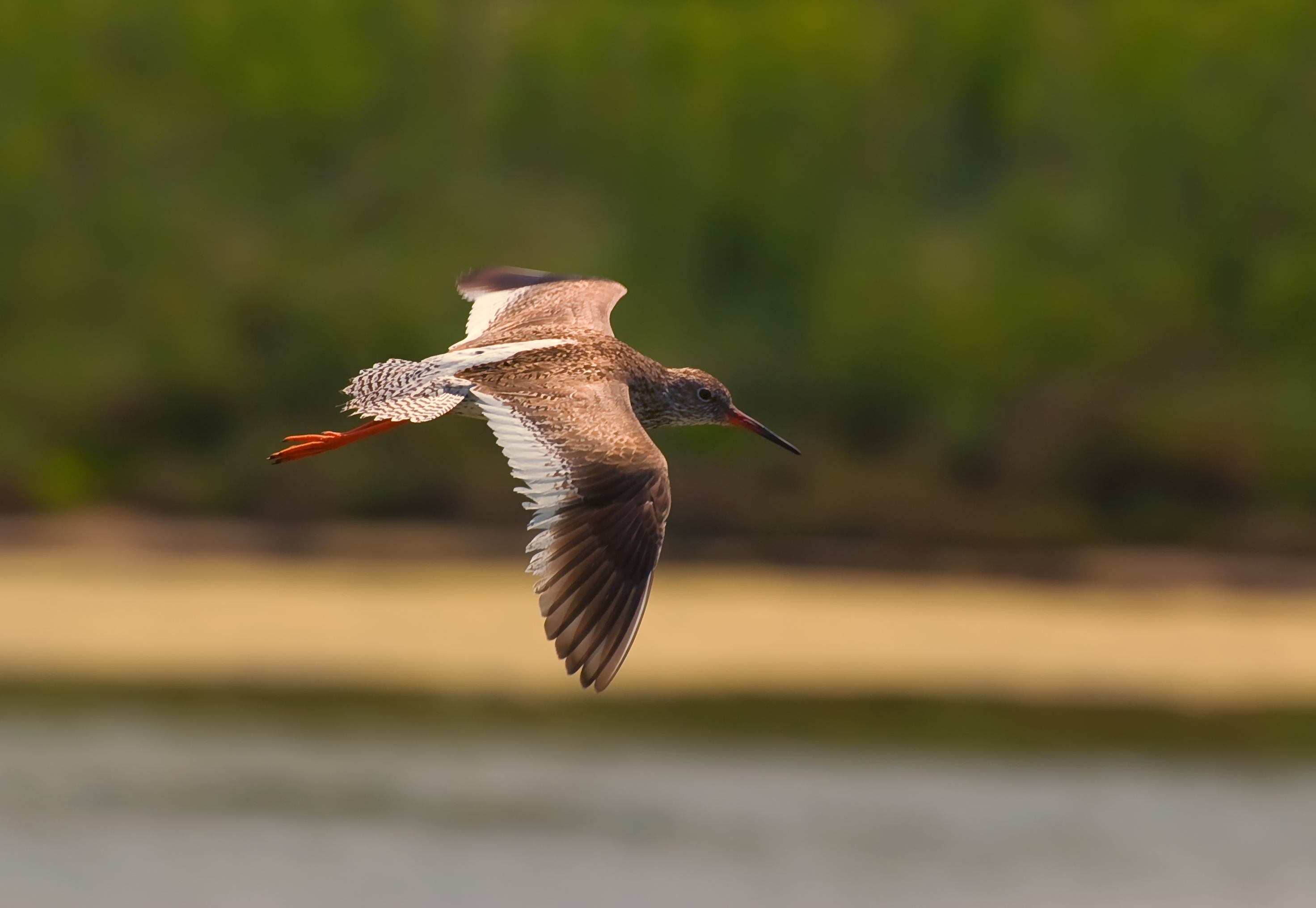
Common redshank, Venetian Lagoon

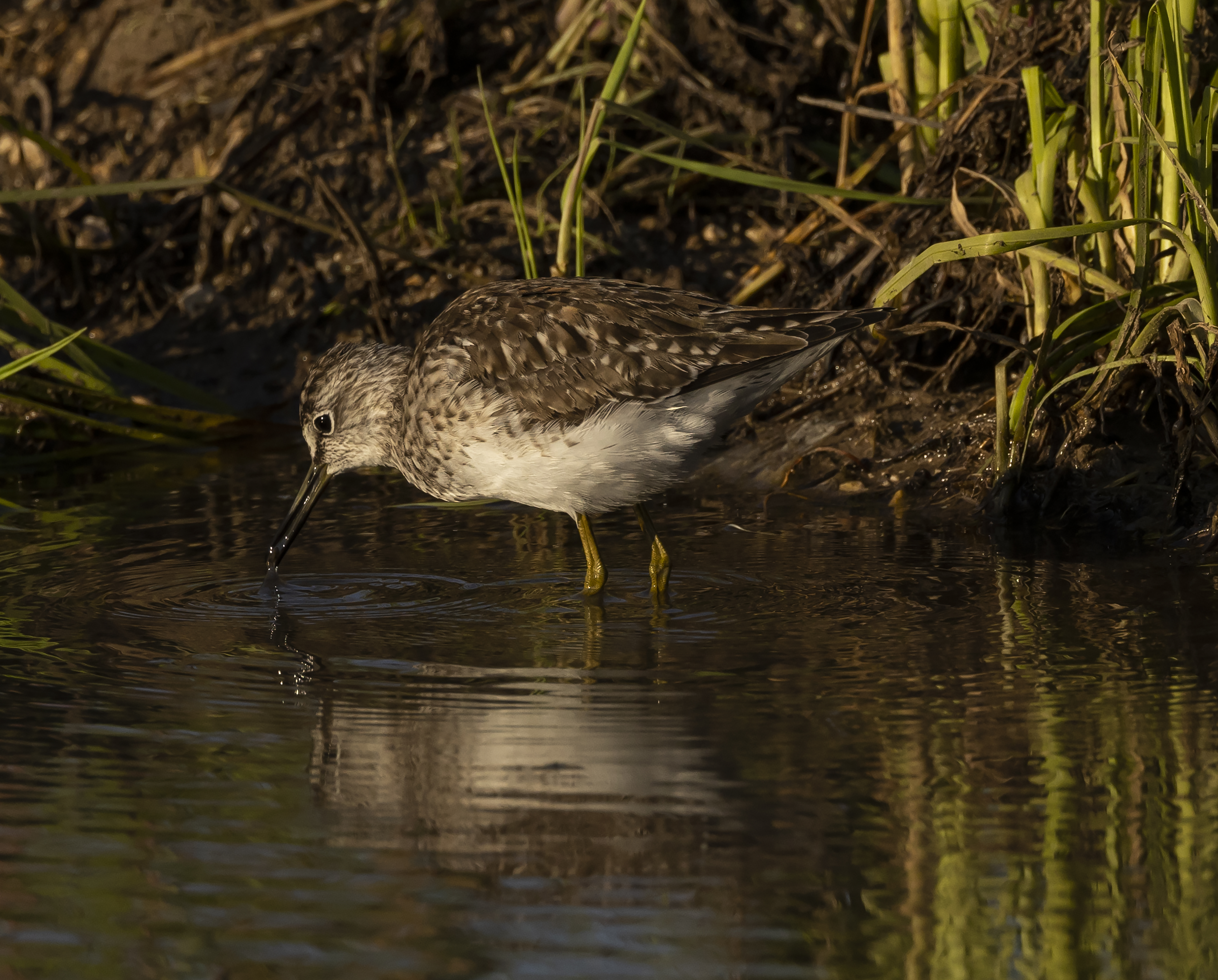
Wood sandpiper, Saline di Margherita di Savoia, Apulia

== Buttonquail ==
Order: Charadriiformes Family: Turnicidae

The buttonquail are small, drab, running birds which superficially resemble quail. The female is the brighter of the sexes and initiates courtship. The male incubates the eggs and tends the young.

- Common buttonquail Turnix sylvaticus Quaglia tridattila – B

== Pratincoles and coursers ==
Order: Charadriiformes Family: Glareolidae

Glareolidae is a family of wading birds comprising the pratincoles, which have short legs, long pointed wings and long forked tails, and the coursers, which have long legs, short wings and longer, pointed bills which curve downwards.

- Cream-coloured courser Cursorius cursor Corrione biondo – A
- Collared pratincole Glareola pratincola Pernice di mare – A
- Black-winged pratincole Glareola nordmanni Pernice di mare orientale – A

== Gulls, terns, and skimmers ==
Order: Charadriiformes Family: Laridae

Laridae is a family of medium to large seabirds, including the gulls and terns. Gulls are typically grey or white, often with black markings on the head or wings. They have longish, stout bills and webbed feet. Terns are a group of generally medium to small seabirds typically with grey or white plumage, often with black markings on the head, slender bills and webbed feet. Most terns hunt fish by diving but some pick insects off the surface of fresh water. Gulls and terns are generally long-lived birds, with several species known to live in excess of 30 years.

- Little gull Hydrocoloeus minutus Gabbianello – A
- Ross's gull Rhodostethia rosea Gabbiano di Ross – A
- Sabine's gull Xema sabini Gabbiano di Sabine – A
- Ivory gull Pagophila eburnea Gabbiano eburneo – A
- Black-legged kittiwake Rissa tridactyla Gabbiano tridattilo – A
- Slender-billed gull Chroicocephalus genei Gabbiano roseo – A
- Black-headed gull Chroicocephalus ridibundus Gabbiano comune – A
- Grey-headed gull Chroicocephalus cirrocephalus Gabbiano testagrigia – A
- Franklin's gull Leucophaeus pipixcan Gabbiano di Franklin – A
- Laughing gull Leucophaeus atricilla Gabbiano sghignazzante – A
- Pallas's gull Ichthyaetus ichthyaetus Gabbiano di Pallas – A
- Mediterranean gull Ichthyaetus melanocephalus Gabbiano corallino – A
- Audouin's gull Ichthyaetus audouinii Gabbiano corso – A
- Ring-billed gull Larus delawarensis Gavina americana – A
- Common gull Larus canus Gavina – A
- Lesser black-backed gull Larus fuscus Zafferano – A
- European herring gull Larus argentatus Gabbiano reale nordico – A
- Yellow-legged gull Larus michahellis Gabbiano reale – A
- Caspian gull Larus cachinnans Gabbiano reale pontico – A
- Iceland gull Larus glaucoides Gabbiano d'Islanda – A
- Glaucous gull Larus hyperboreus Gabbiano glauco – A
- Great black-backed gull Larus marinus Mugnaiaccio – A
- Sooty tern Onychoprion fuscatus Sterna scura – B
- Little tern Sternula albifrons Fraticello – A
- Gull-billed tern Gelochelidon nilotica Sterna zampenere – A
- Caspian tern Hydroprogne caspia Sterna maggiore – A
- Whiskered tern Chlidonias hybrida Mignattino piombato – A
- White-winged tern Chlidonias leucopterus Mignattino alibianche – A
- Black tern Chlidonias niger Mignattino comune – A
- Roseate tern Sterna dougallii Sterna di Dougall – A
- Common tern Sterna hirundo Sterna comune – A
- Arctic tern Sterna paradisaea Sterna codalunga – A
- Lesser crested tern Thalasseus bengalensis Sterna di Rueppell – A
- Sandwich tern Thalasseus sandvicensis Beccapesci – A
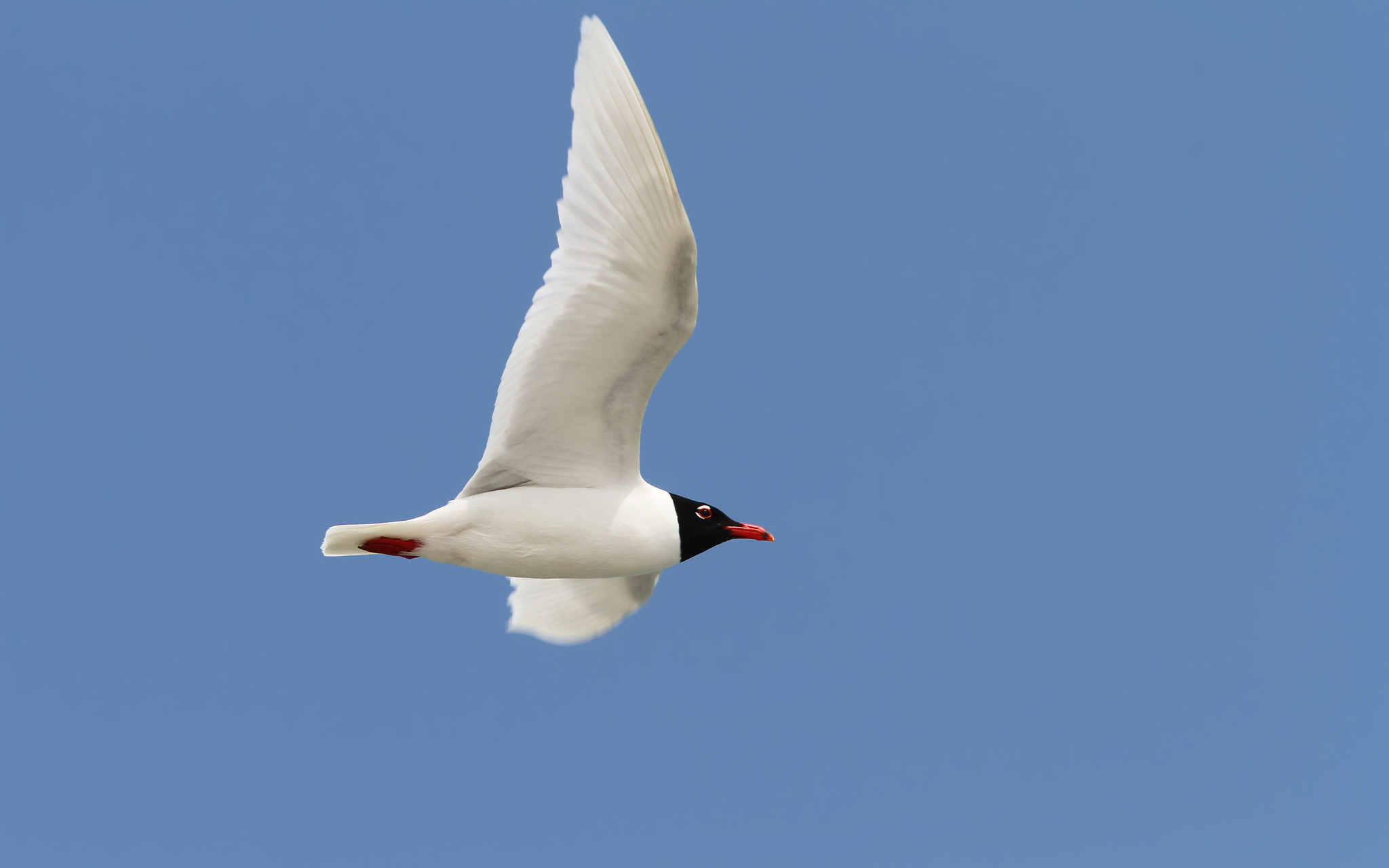
Mediterranean gull, Ferrara, Ravenna

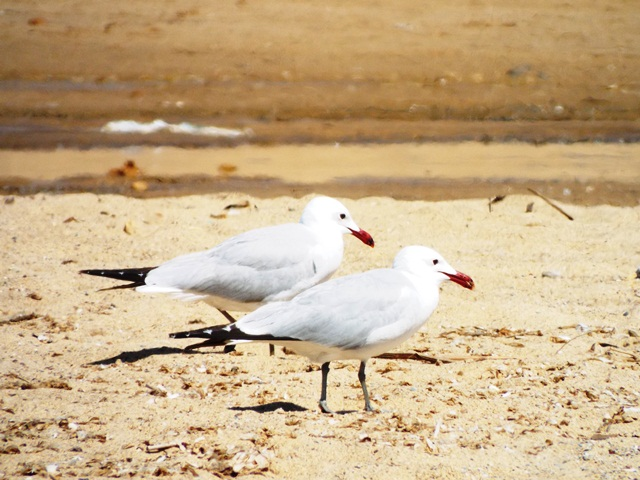
Audouin's gull, Sardinia

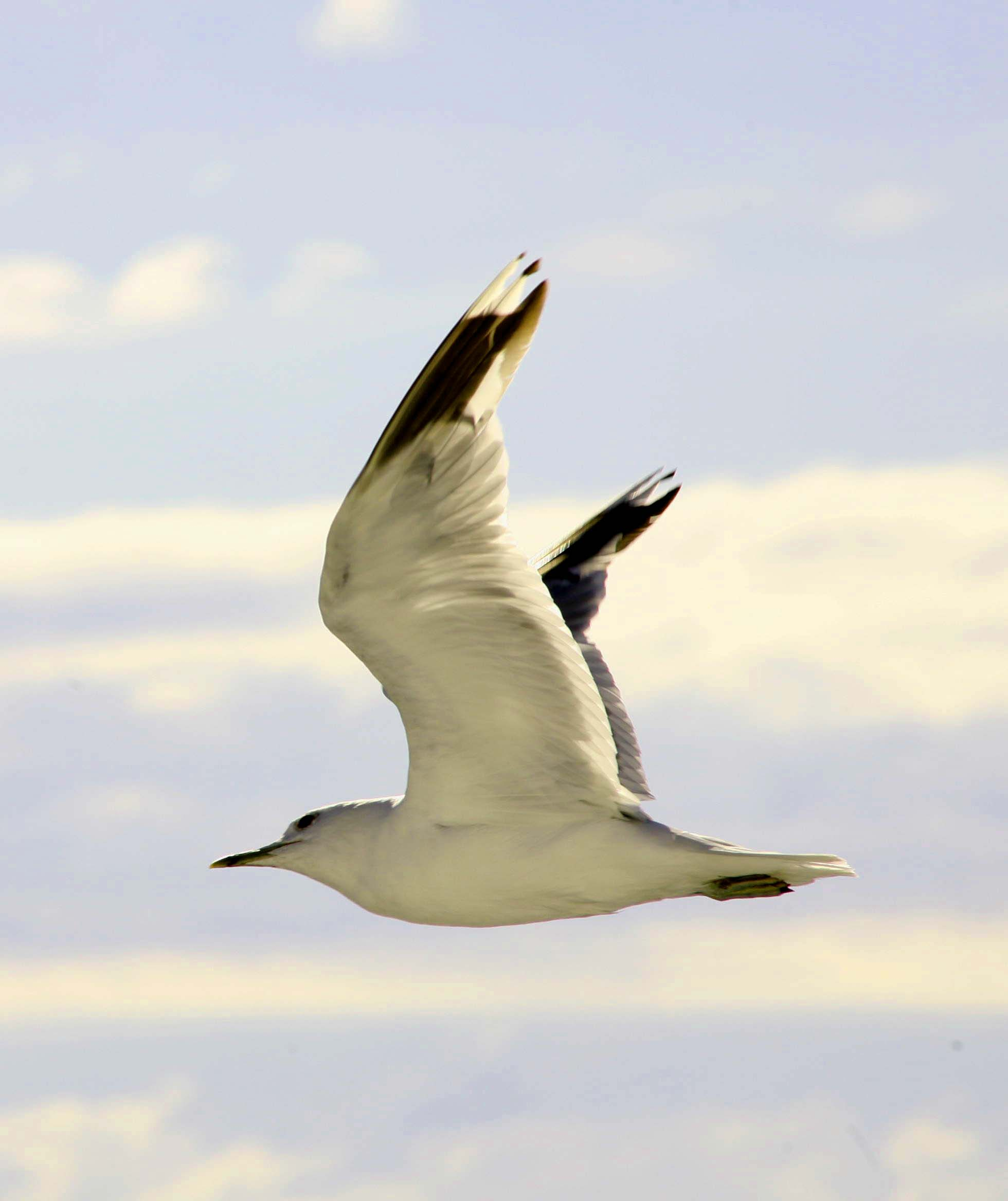
Common gull

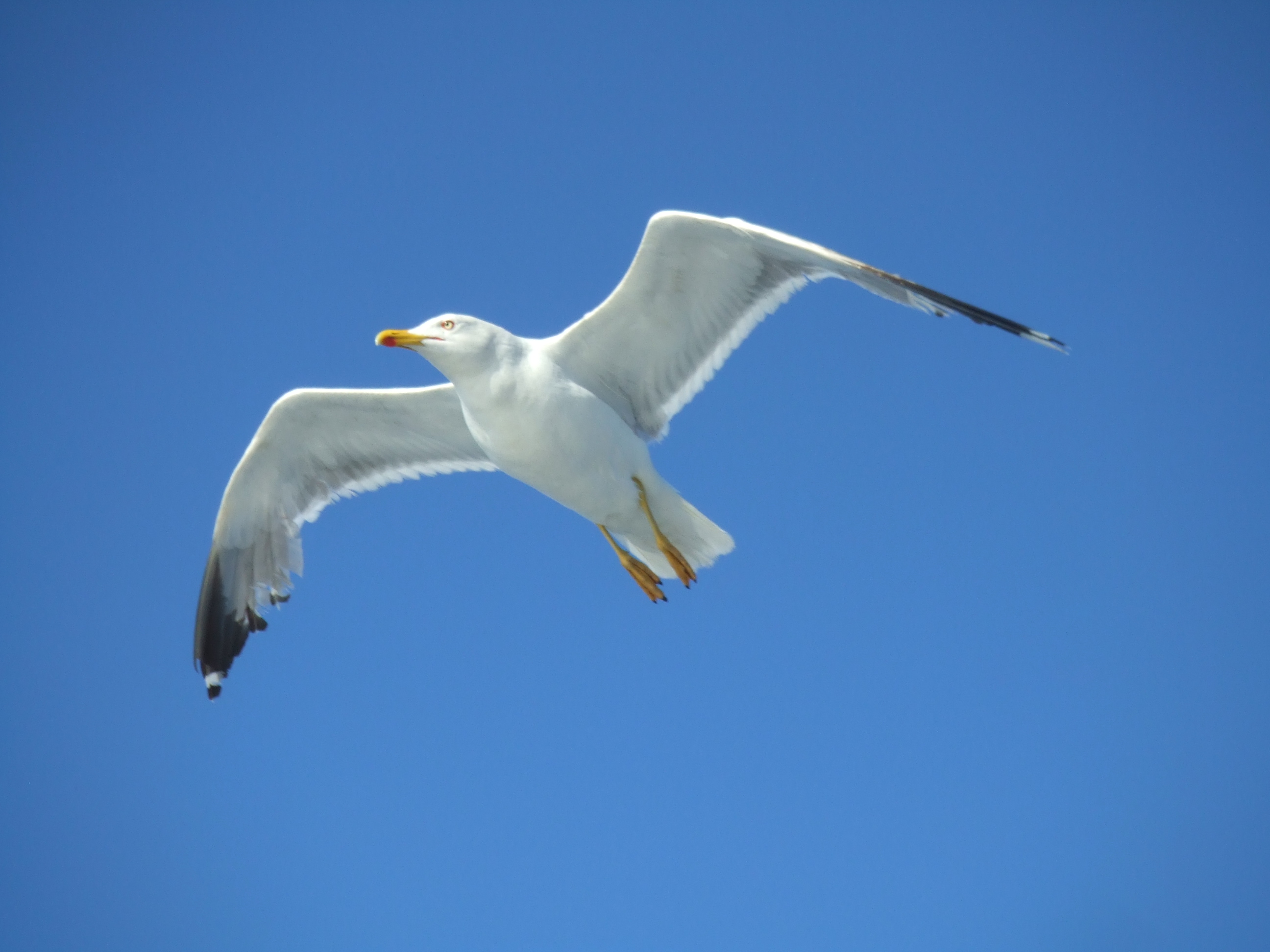
Yellow-legged gull, Elba

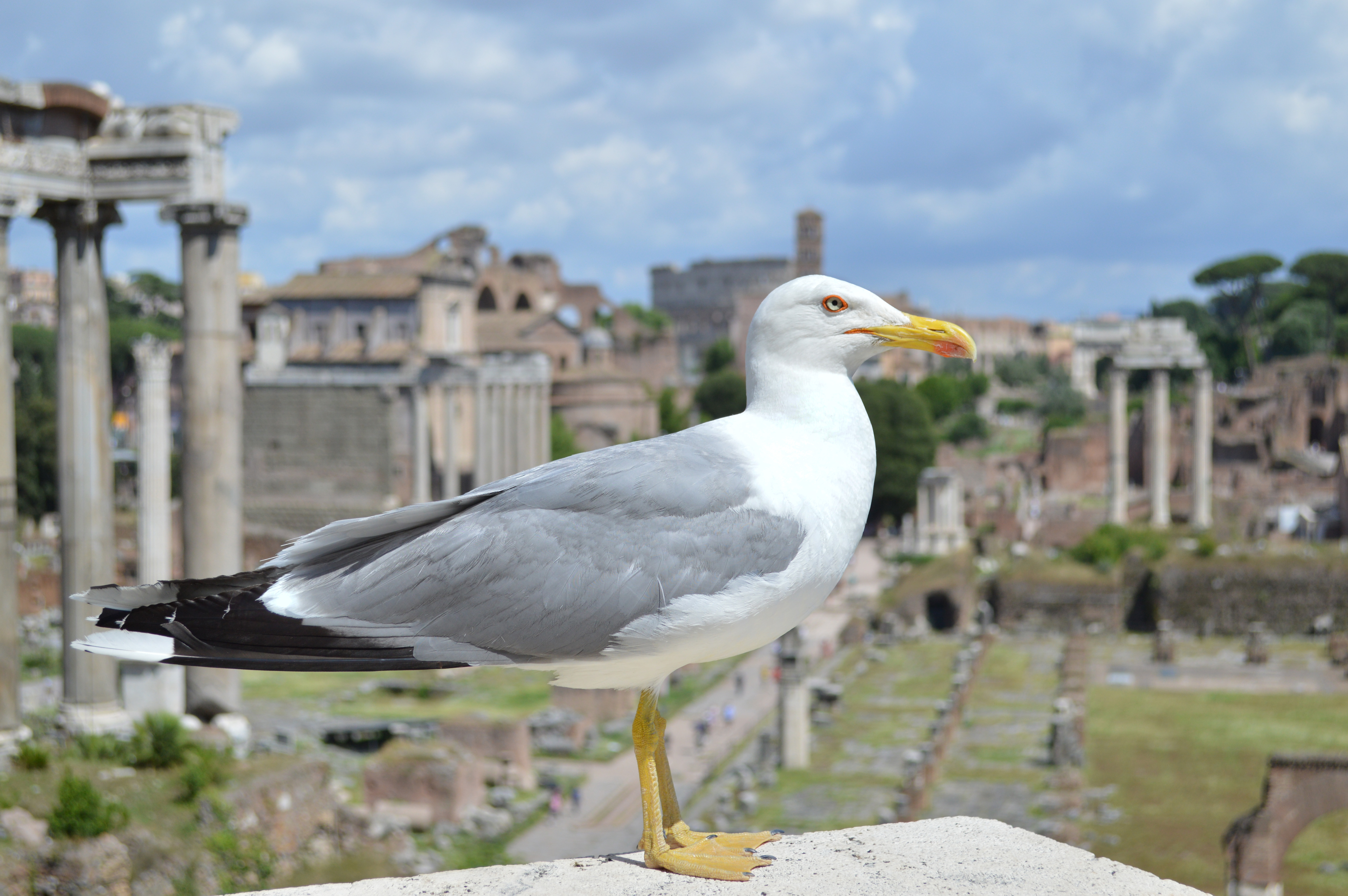
Yellow-legged gull, Rome

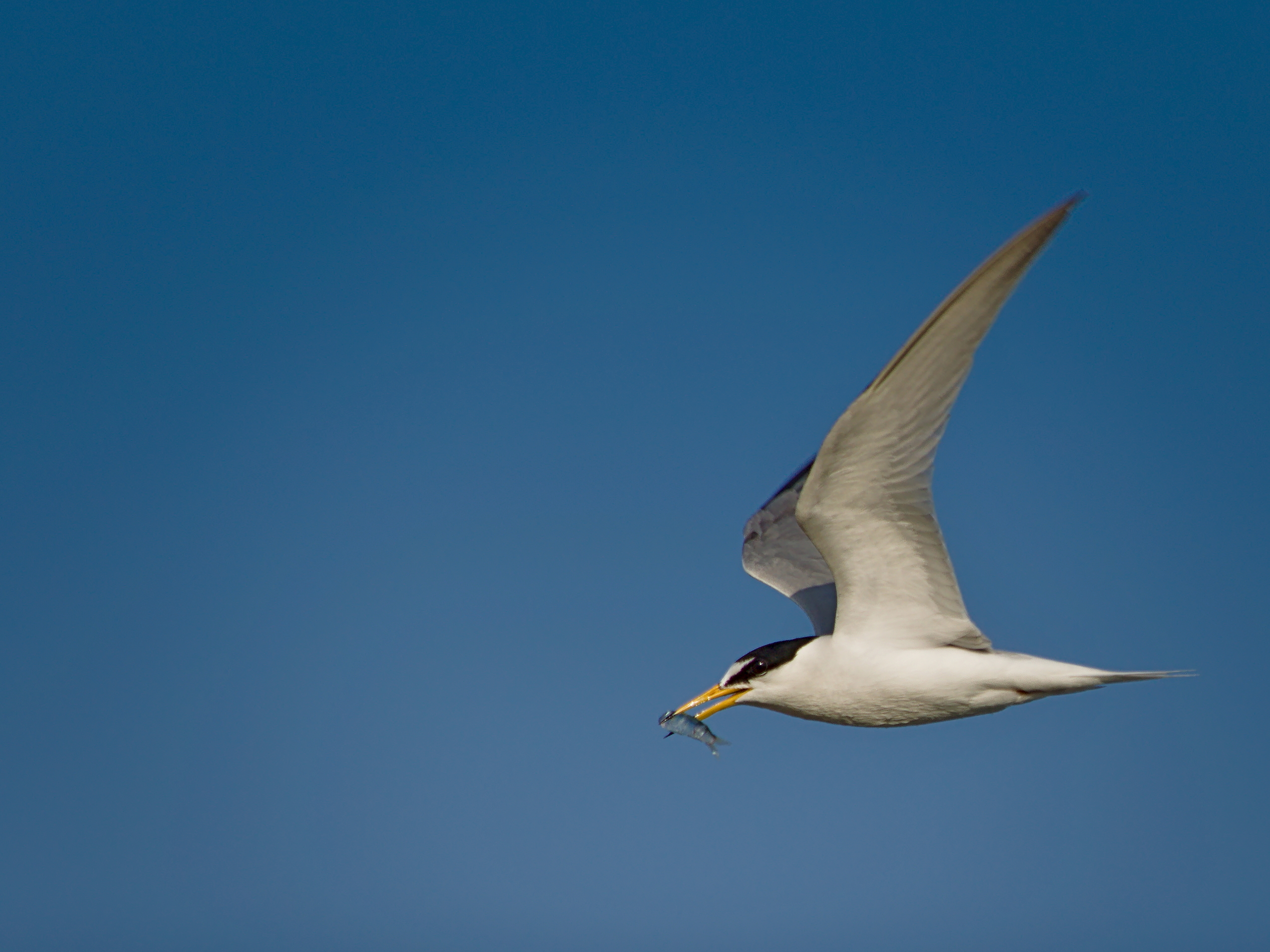
Little tern, Saline di Augusta, Sicily

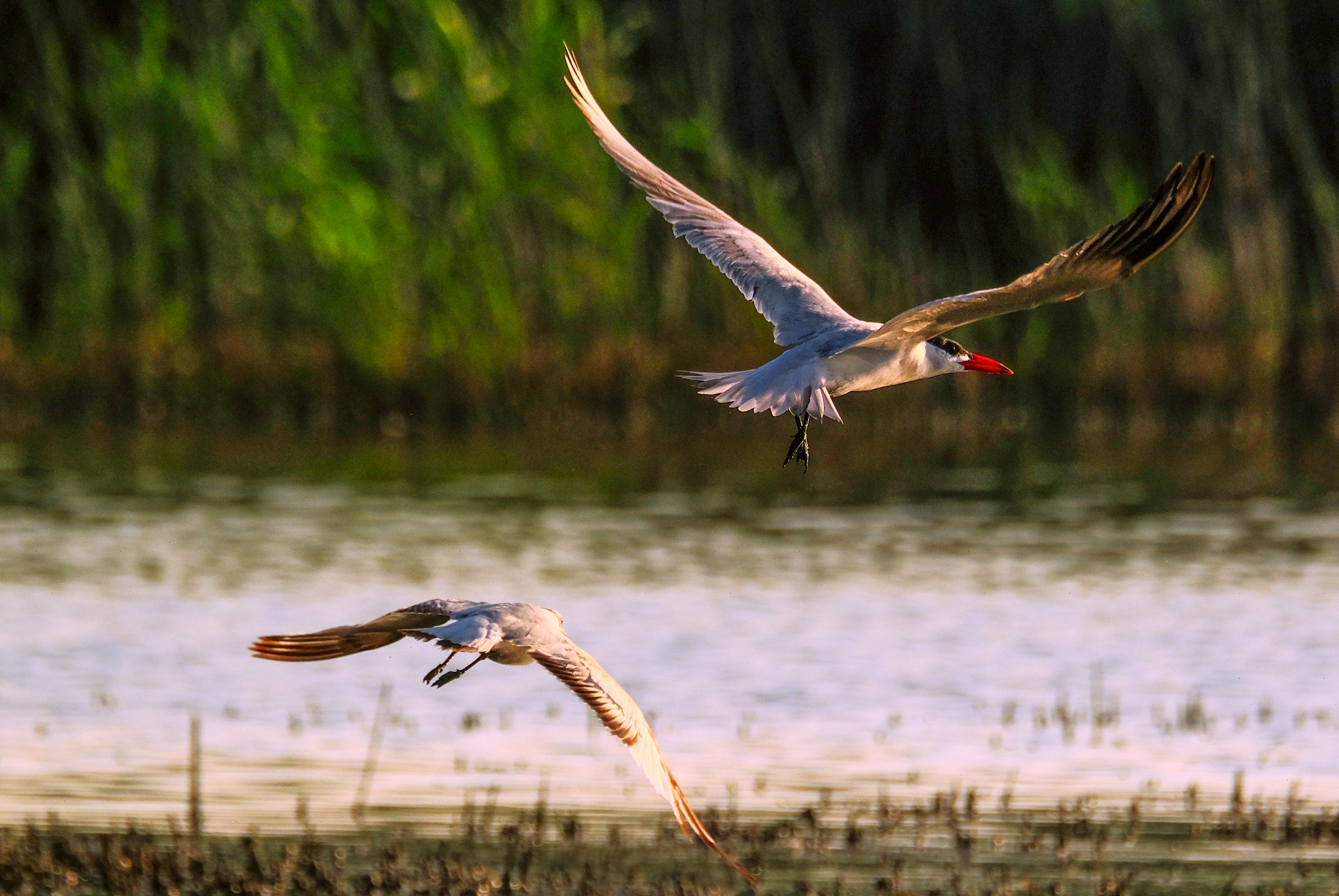
Caspian tern (above) and black-headed gull (below), Livorno

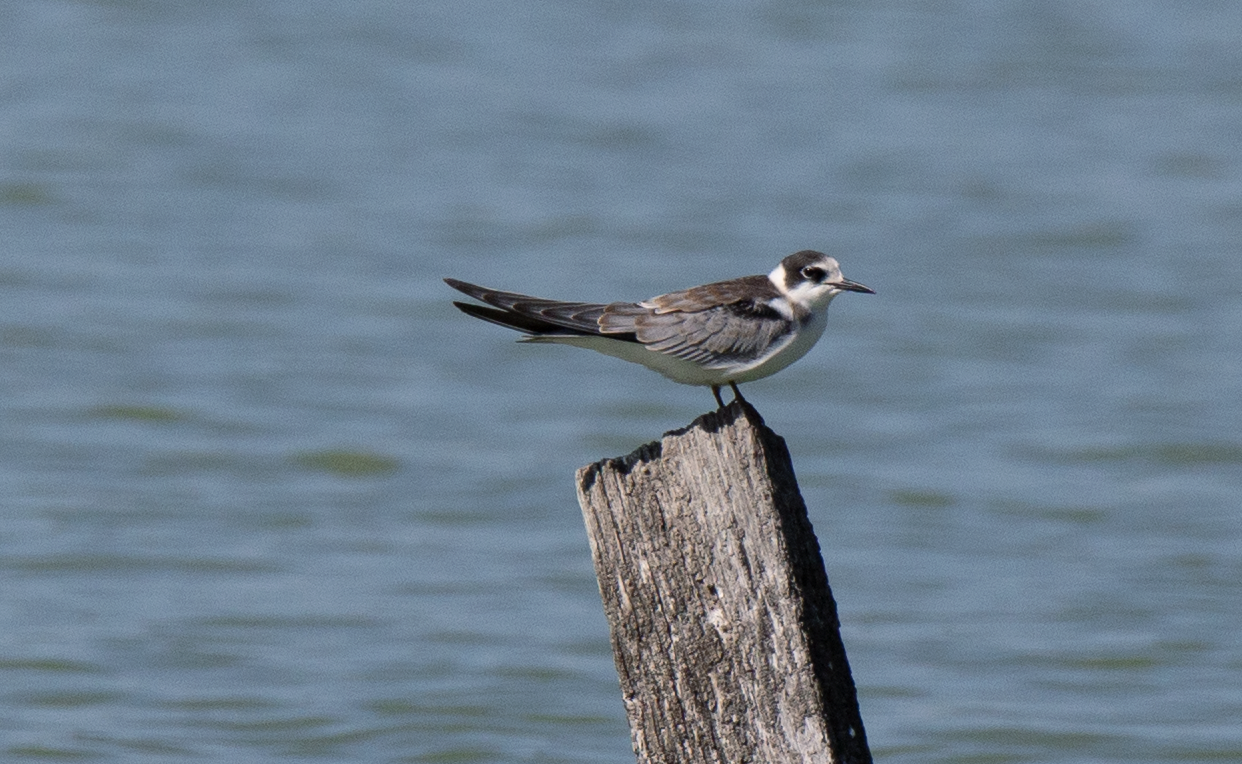
Black tern, Torrile, Parma, Emilia-Romagna

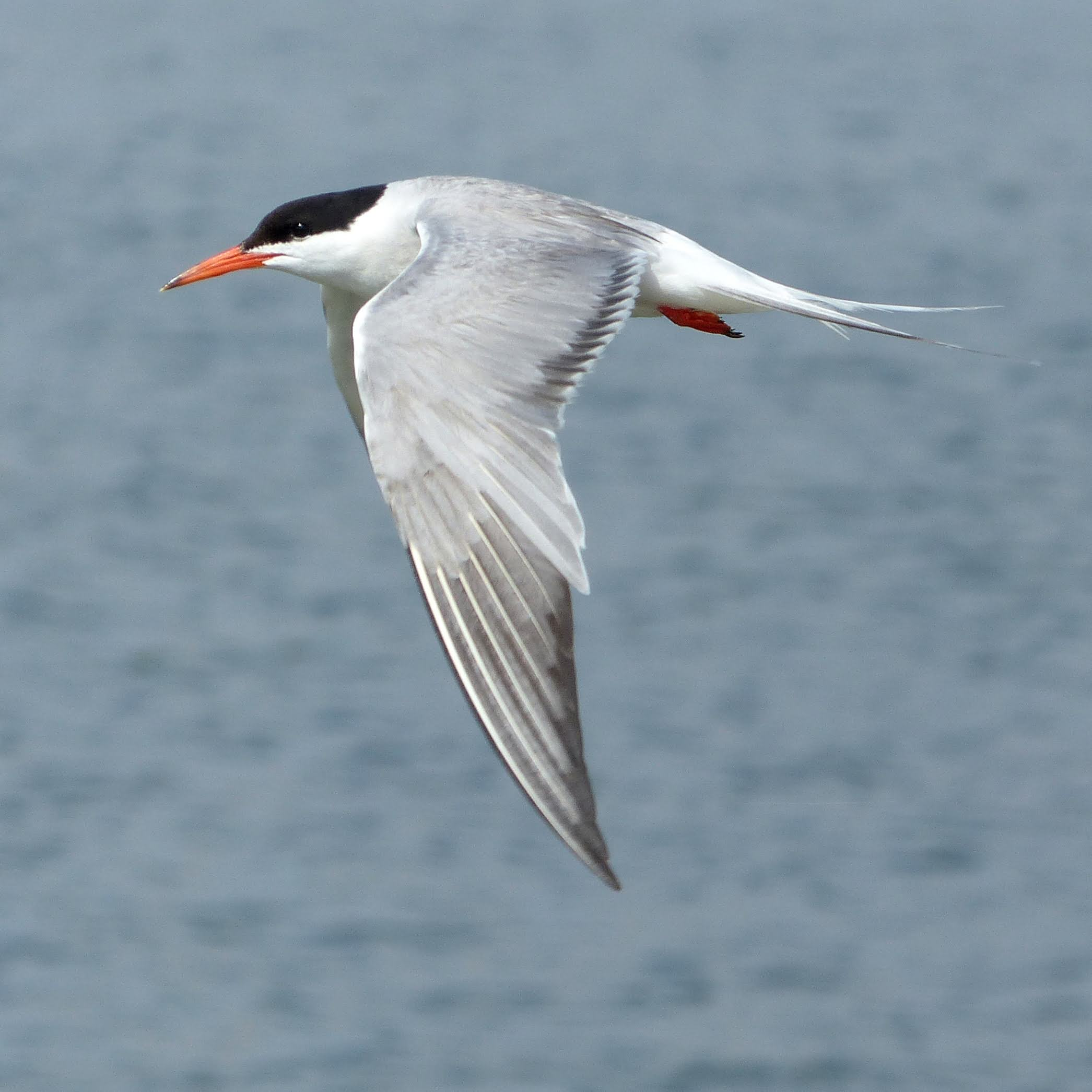
Common tern, Molentargius - Saline Regional Park, Sardinia

== Skuas ==
Order: Charadriiformes Family: Stercorariidae

The family Stercorariidae are, in general, medium to large birds, typically with grey or brown plumage, often with white markings on the wings. They nest on the ground in temperate and arctic regions and are long-distance migrants.

- Long-tailed skua Stercorarius longicaudus Labbo codalunga – A
- Arctic skua Stercorarius parasiticus Labbo – A
- Pomarine skua Stercorarius pomarinus Stercorario mezzano – A
- Great skua Stercorarius skua Stercorario maggiore – A

== Auks, guillemots, and puffins ==
Order: Charadriiformes Family: Alcidae

Auks are superficially similar to penguins due to their black-and-white colour, their upright posture and some of their habits, however they are not related to the penguins and differ in being able to fly. Auks live on the open sea, normally only coming ashore to nest.

- Atlantic puffin Fratercula arctica Pulcinella di mare – A
- Razorbill Alca torda Gazza marina – A
- Little auk Alle alle Gazza marina minore – A
- Common guillemot Uria aalge Uria – A

== Barn owls ==
Order: Strigiformes Family: Tytonidae

Barn owls are medium to large owls with large heads and characteristic heart-shaped faces. They have long strong legs with powerful talons.

- Western barn owl Tyto alba Barbagianni – A

== Owls ==
Order: Strigiformes Family: Strigidae

The typical owls are small to large solitary nocturnal birds of prey. They have large forward-facing eyes, a hawk-like beak and a conspicuous circle of feathers around each eye called a facial disk.

- Eurasian pygmy owl Glaucidium passerinum Civetta nana – A
- Little owl Athene noctua Civetta – A
- Boreal owl Aegolius funereus Civetta capogrosso – A
- Eurasian scops owl Otus scops Assiolo – A
- Long-eared owl Asio otus Gufo comune – A
- Short-eared owl Asio flammeus Gufo di palude – A
- Tawny owl Strix aluco Allocco – A
- Ural owl Strix uralensis Allocco degli Urali – A
- Eurasian eagle-owl Bubo bubo Gufo reale – A
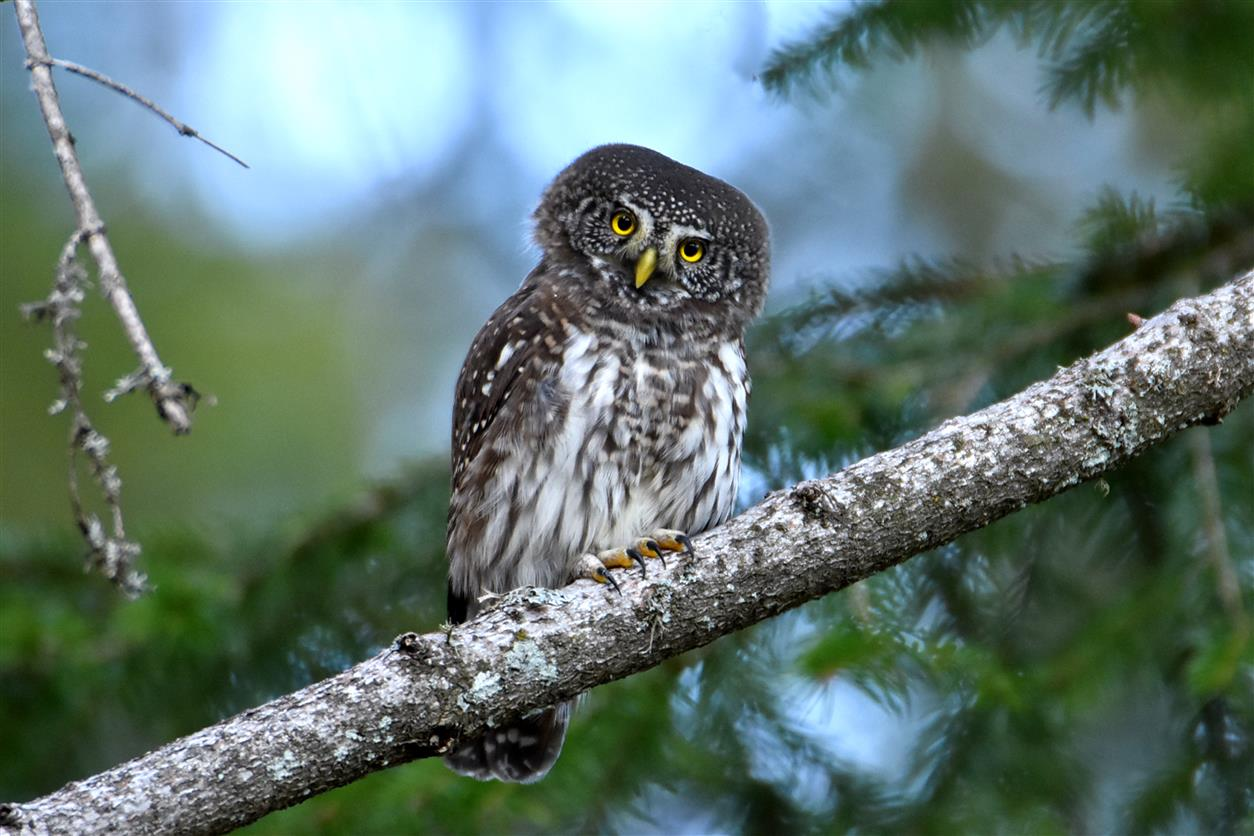
Eurasian pygmy-owl, Valtellina Orobic Alps Regional Park, Lombardy

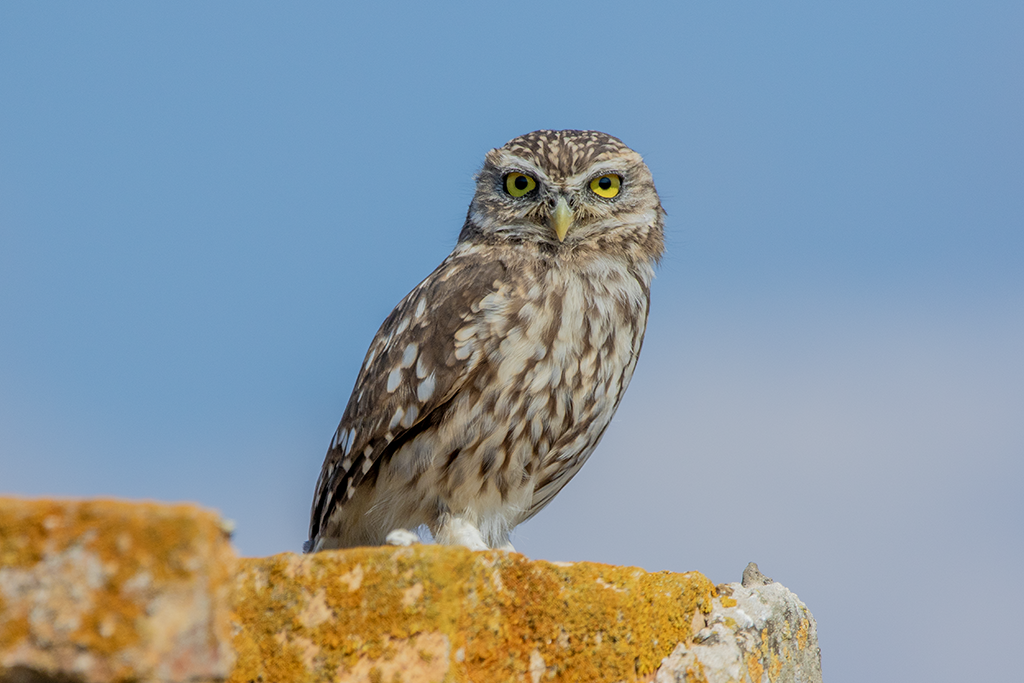
Little owl, Giba, Sardinia

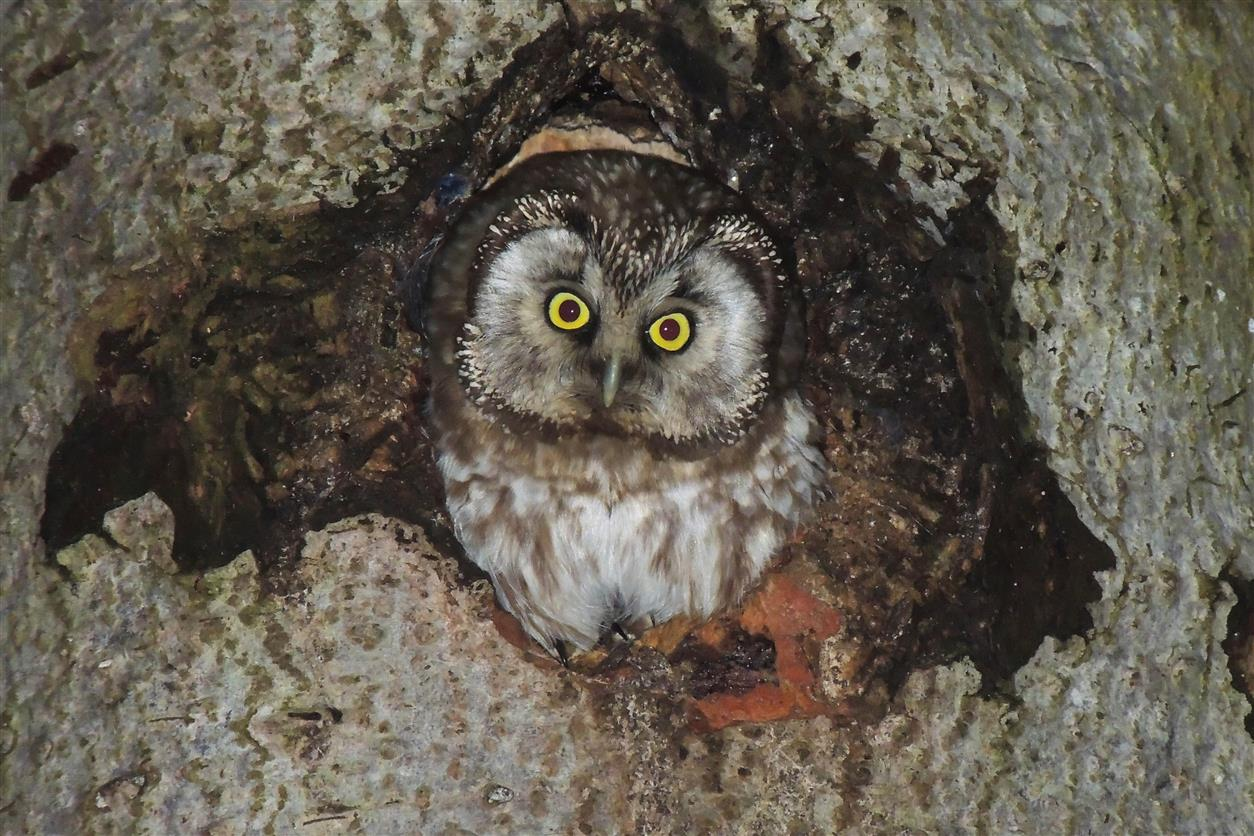
Boreal owl, Valtellina Orobic Alps Regional Park, Lombardy

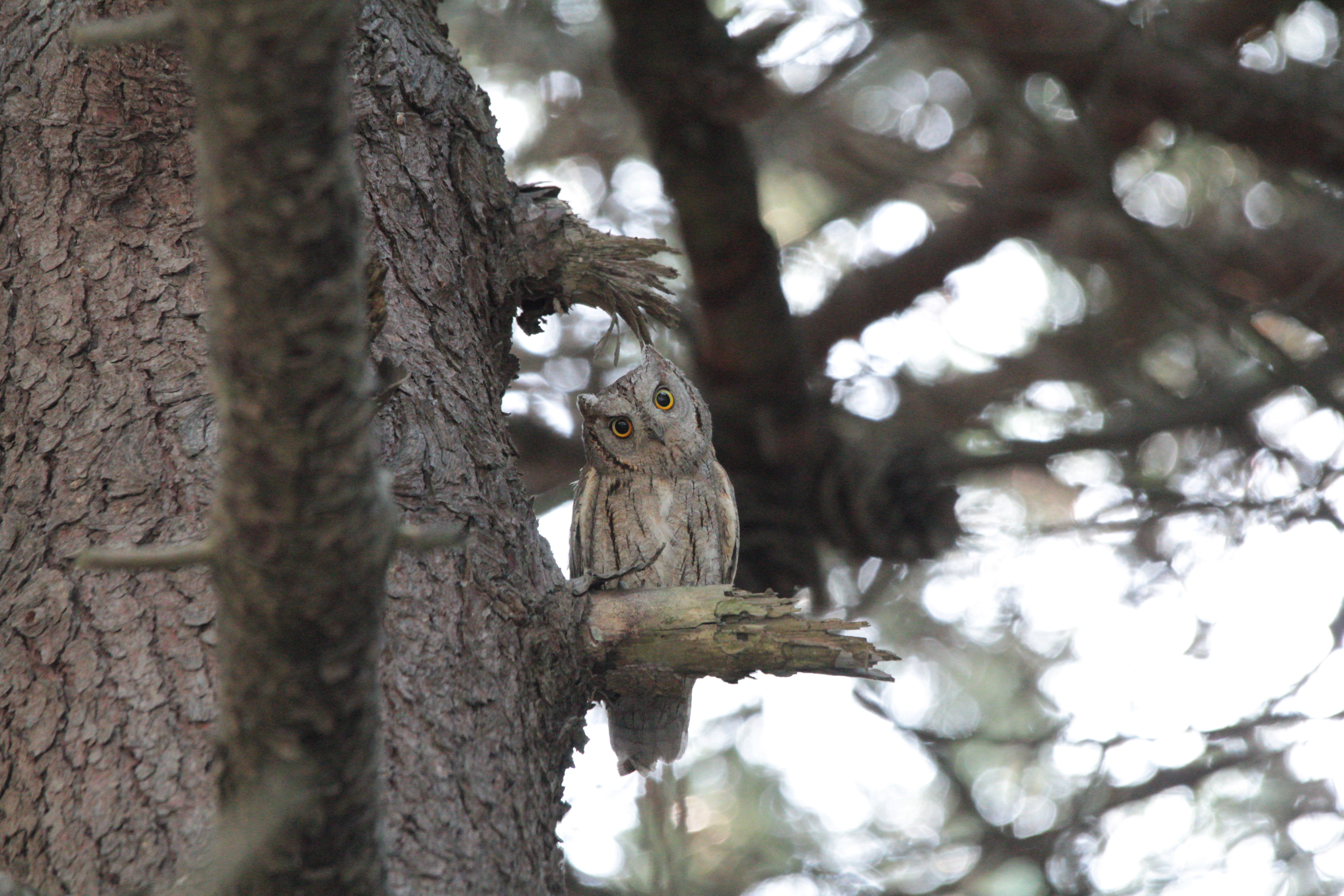
Eurasian scops-owl, Ferrera

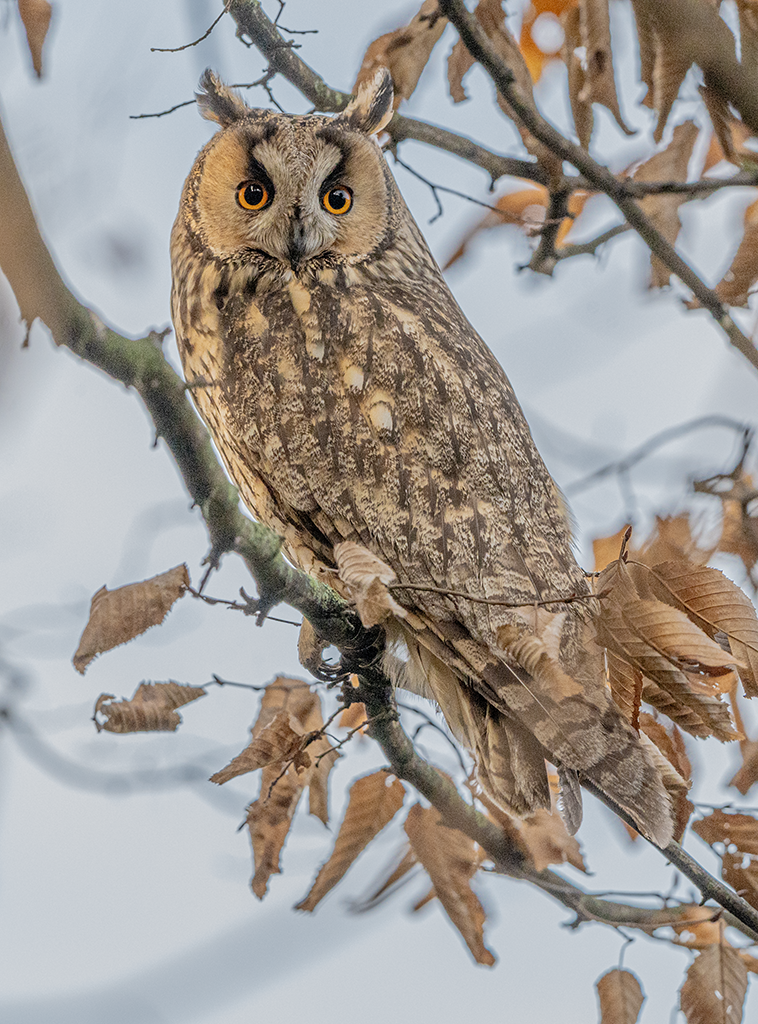
Long-eared owl, Cerro Maggiore, Lombardy

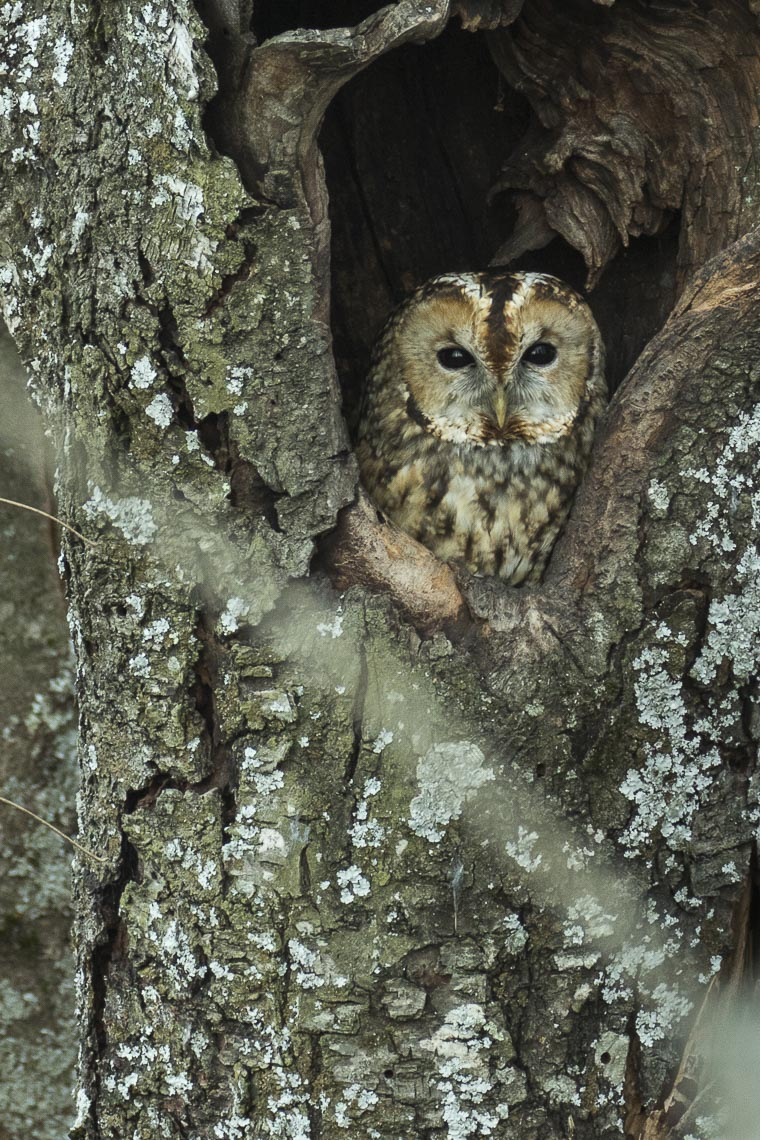
Tawny owl, Apennine Mountains

== Osprey ==
Order: Accipitriformes Family: Pandionidae

The family Pandionidae contains only one species, the osprey. The osprey is a medium-large raptor which is a specialist fish-eater with a worldwide distribution.

- Osprey Pandion haliaetus Falco pescatore – A

== Hawks, eagles, and kites ==
Order: Accipitriformes Family: Accipitridae

Accipitridae is a family of birds of prey, which includes hawks, eagles, kites, harriers and Old World vultures. These birds have powerful hooked beaks for tearing flesh from their prey, strong legs, powerful talons and keen eyesight.

- Black-winged kite Elanus caeruleus Nibbio bianco – A
- European honey-buzzard Pernis apivorus Falco pecchiaiolo – A
- Oriental honey-buzzard Pernis ptilorhynchus Falco pecchiaiolo orientale – A
- Bearded vulture Gypaetus barbatus Gipeto – AC
- Egyptian vulture Neophron percnopterus Capovaccaio – A
- Short-toed snake eagle Circaetus gallicus Biancone – A
- Rüppell's vulture Gyps rueppelli Grifone di Rueppell – A
- Griffon vulture Gyps fulvus Grifone – A
- Eurasian black vulture Aegypius monachus Avvoltoio monaco – A
- Lesser spotted eagle Clanga pomarina Aquila anatraia minore – A
- Greater spotted eagle Clanga clanga Aquila anatraia maggiore – A
- Tawny eagle Aquila rapax Aquila rapace – B
- Steppe eagle Aquila nipalensis Aquila delle steppe – A
- Eastern imperial eagle Aquila heliaca Aquila imperiale – A
- Golden eagle Aquila chrysaetos Aquila reale – A
- Bonelli's eagle Aquila fasciata Aquila di Bonelli – A
- Booted eagle Hieraaetus pennatus Aquila minore – A
- Western marsh harrier Circus aeruginosus Falco di palude – A
- Hen harrier Circus cyaneus Albanella reale – A
- Pallid harrier Circus macrourus Albanella pallida – A
- Montagu's harrier Circus pygargus Albanella minore – A
- Levant sparrowhawk Tachyspiza brevipes Sparviere levantino – A
- Eurasian sparrowhawk Accipiter nisus Sparviere – A
- Eurasian goshawk Astur gentilis Astore – A
- White-tailed eagle Haliaeetus albicilla Aquila di mare – A
- Red kite Milvus milvus Nibbio reale – A
- Black kite Milvus migrans Nibbio bruno – A
- Rough-legged buzzard Buteo lagopus Poiana calzata – A
- Common buzzard Buteo buteo Poiana – A
- Long-legged buzzard Buteo rufinus Poiana codabianca – A
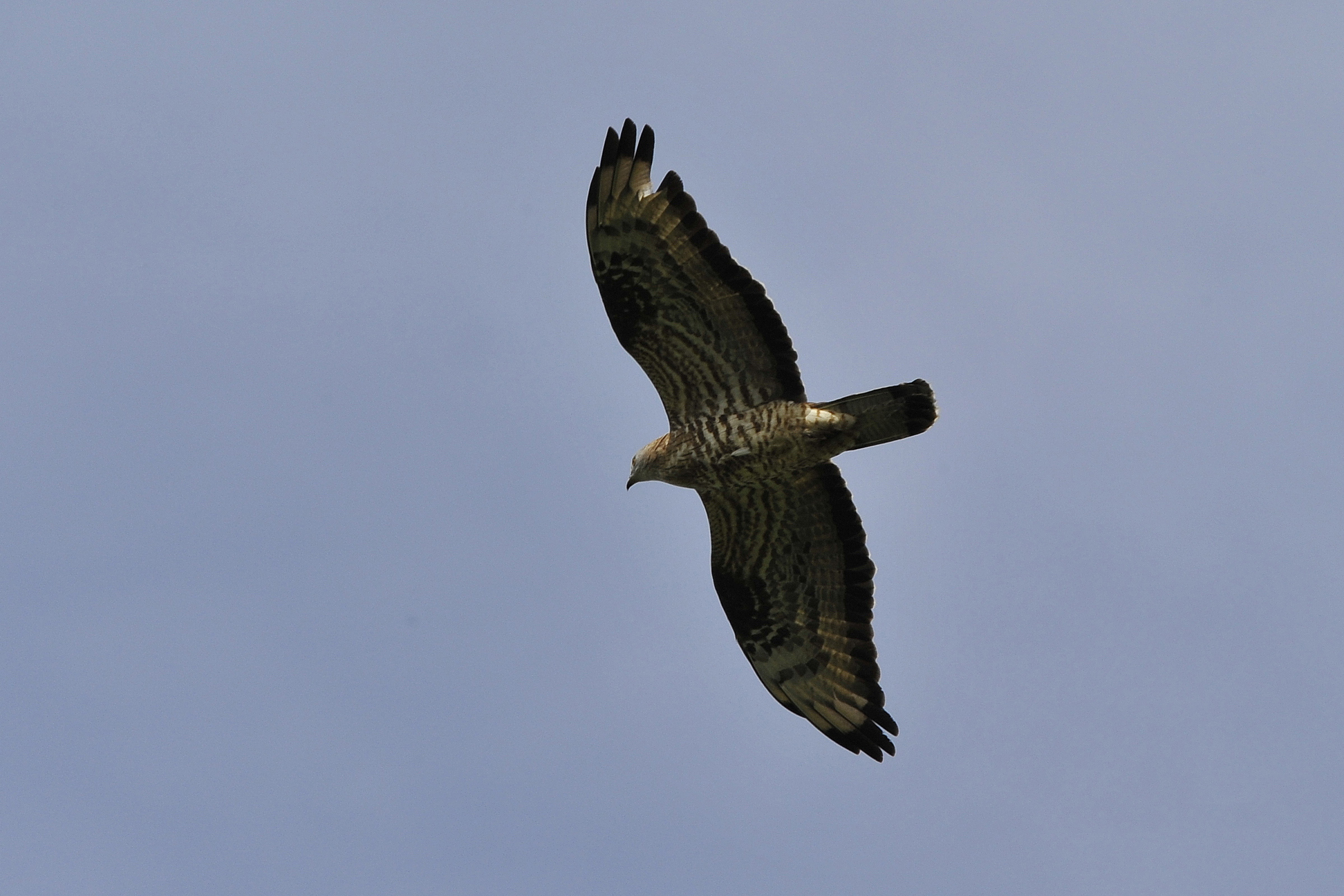
European honey-buzzard, Palude Brabbia Nature Reserve, Inarzo, Lombardy

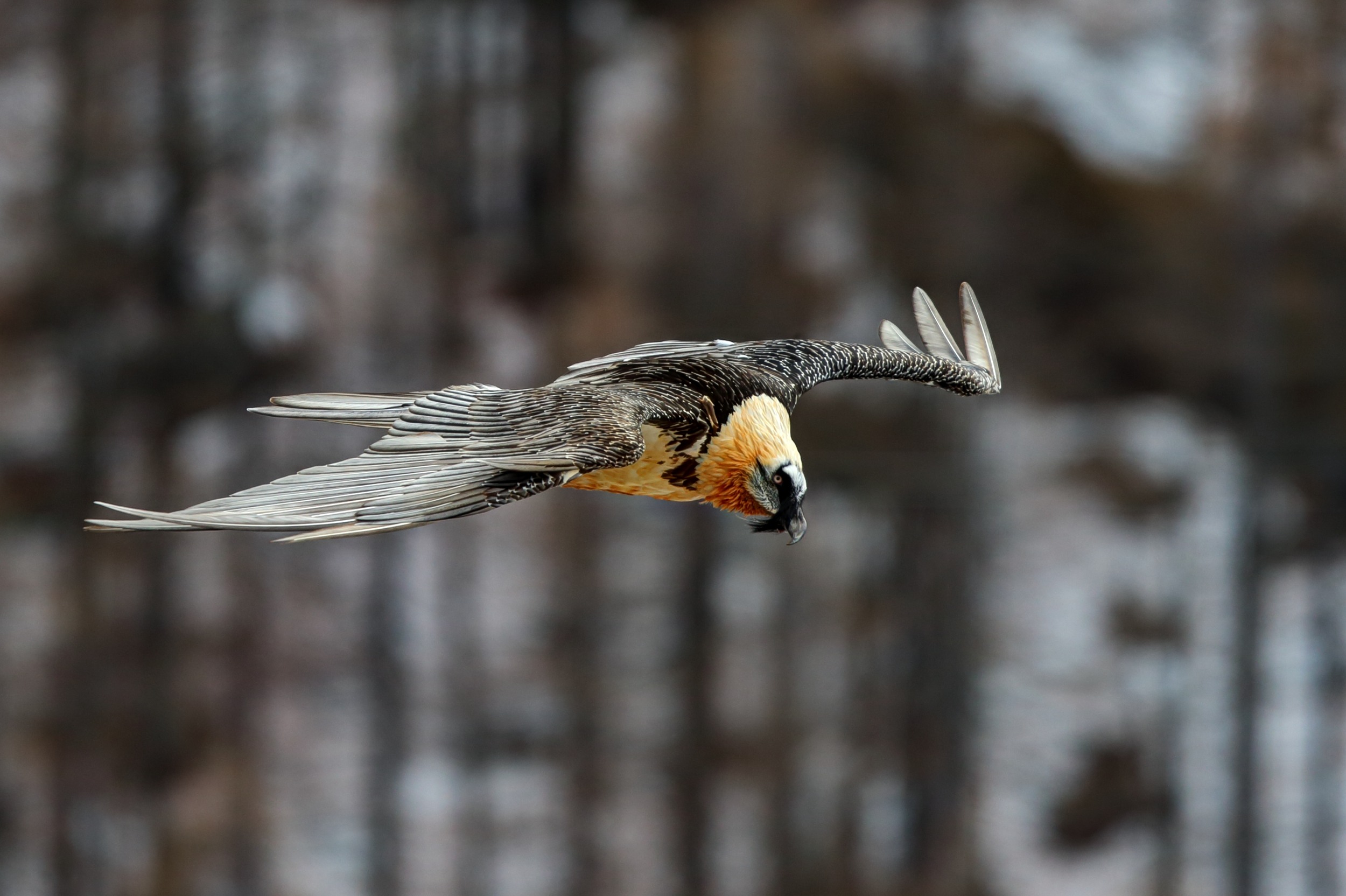
Bearded vulture, Gran Paradiso National Park

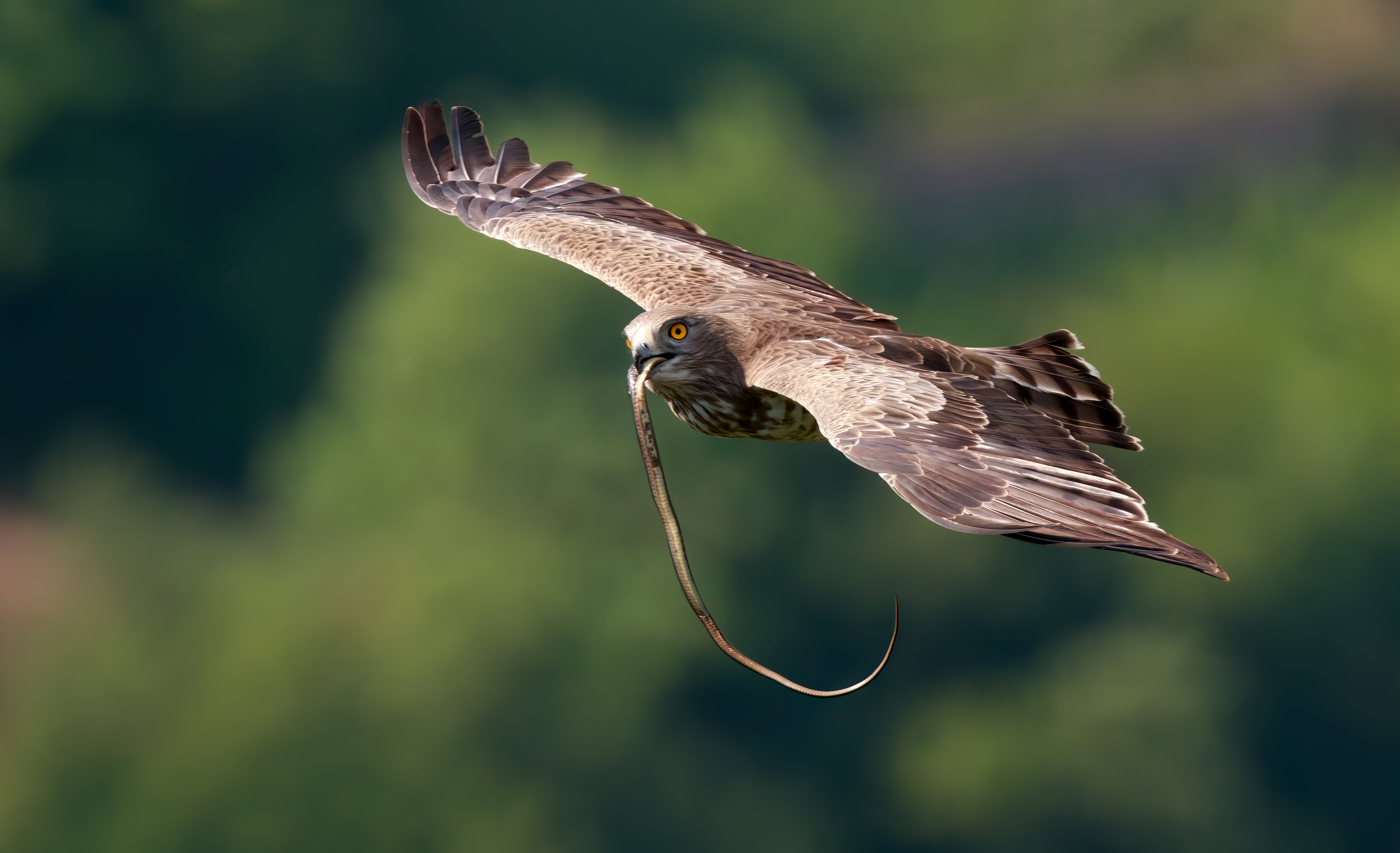
Short-toed snake-eagle, Trentino-South Tyrol

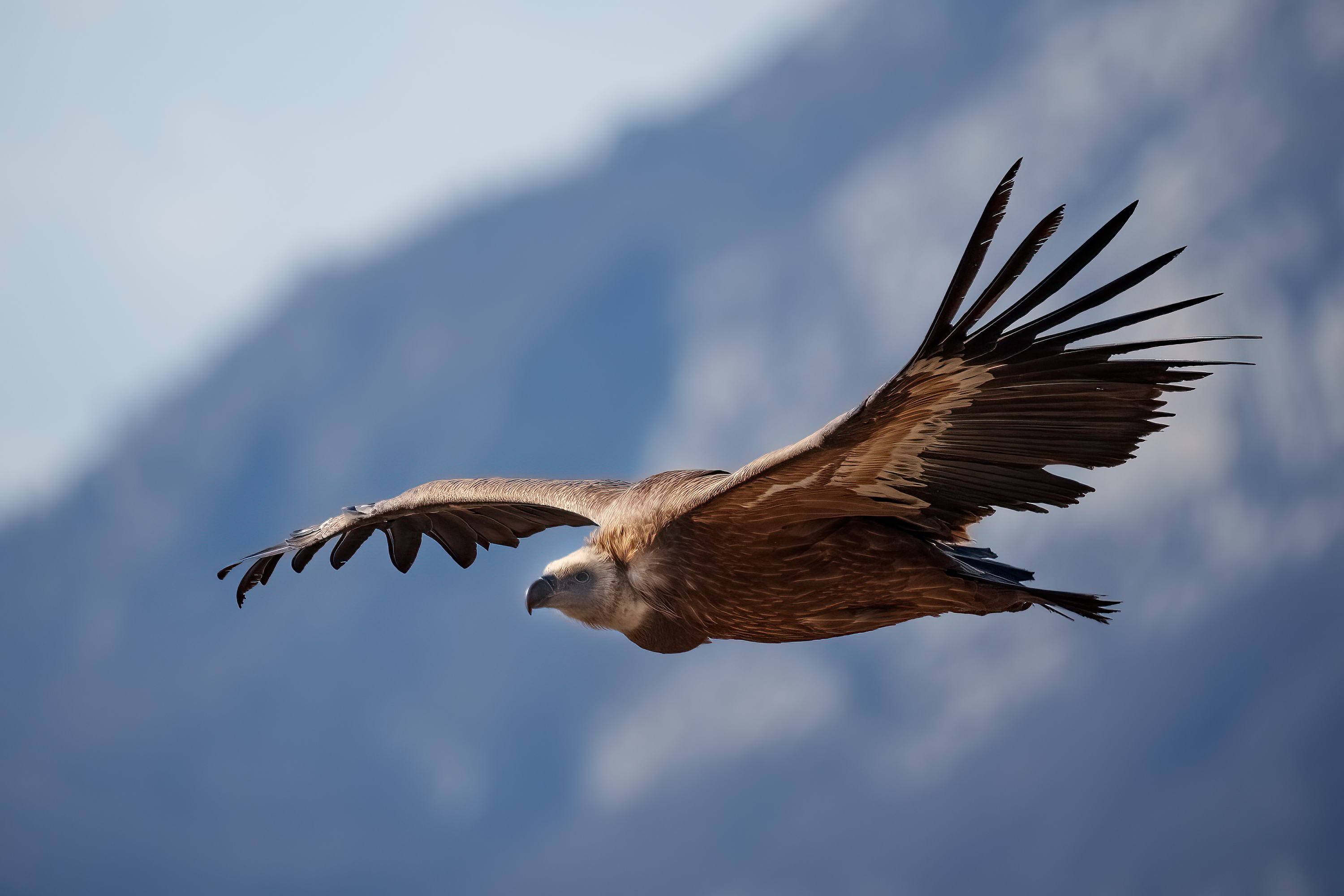
Griffon vulture, Julian Prealps Natural Park

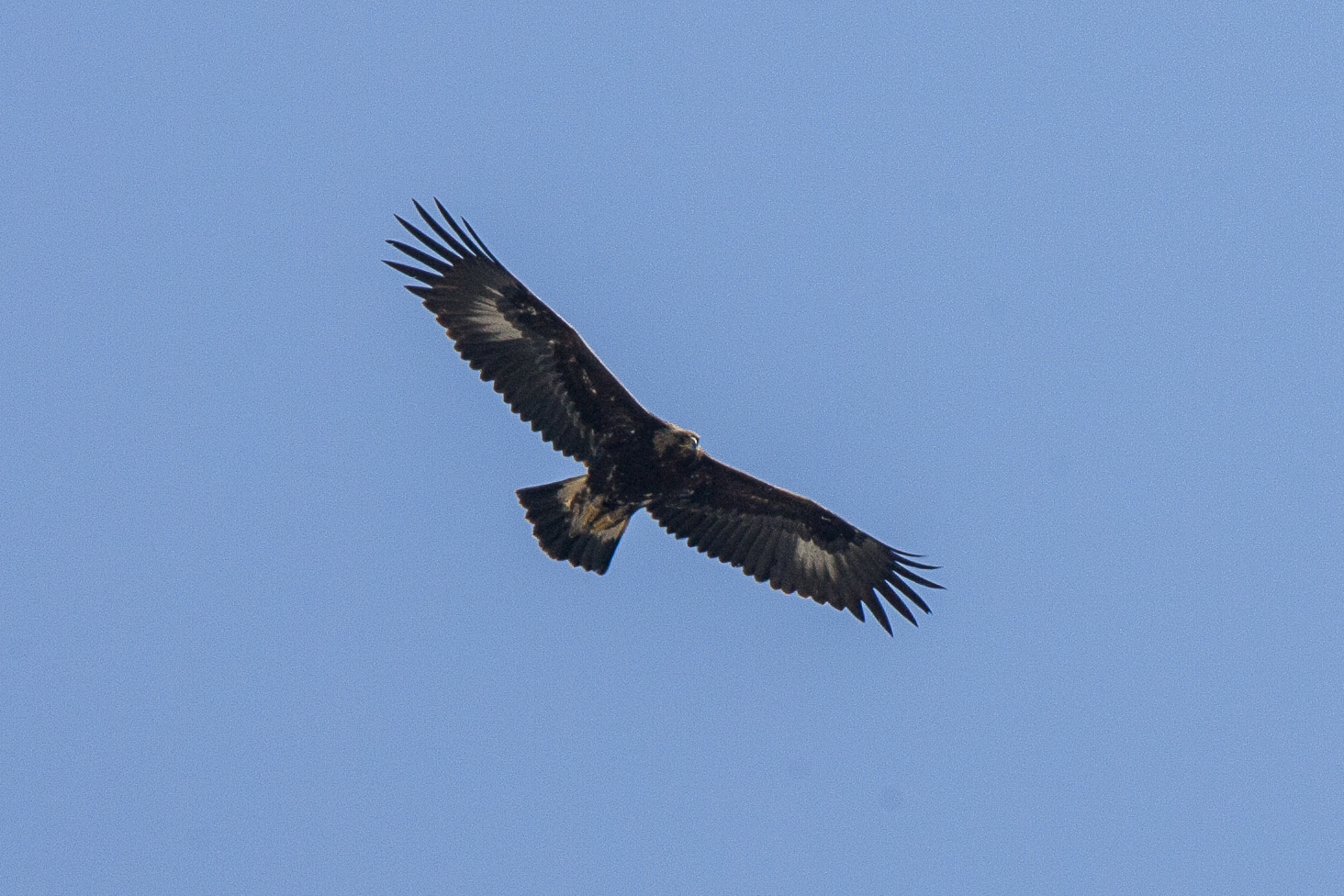
Golden eagle, Aosta Valley

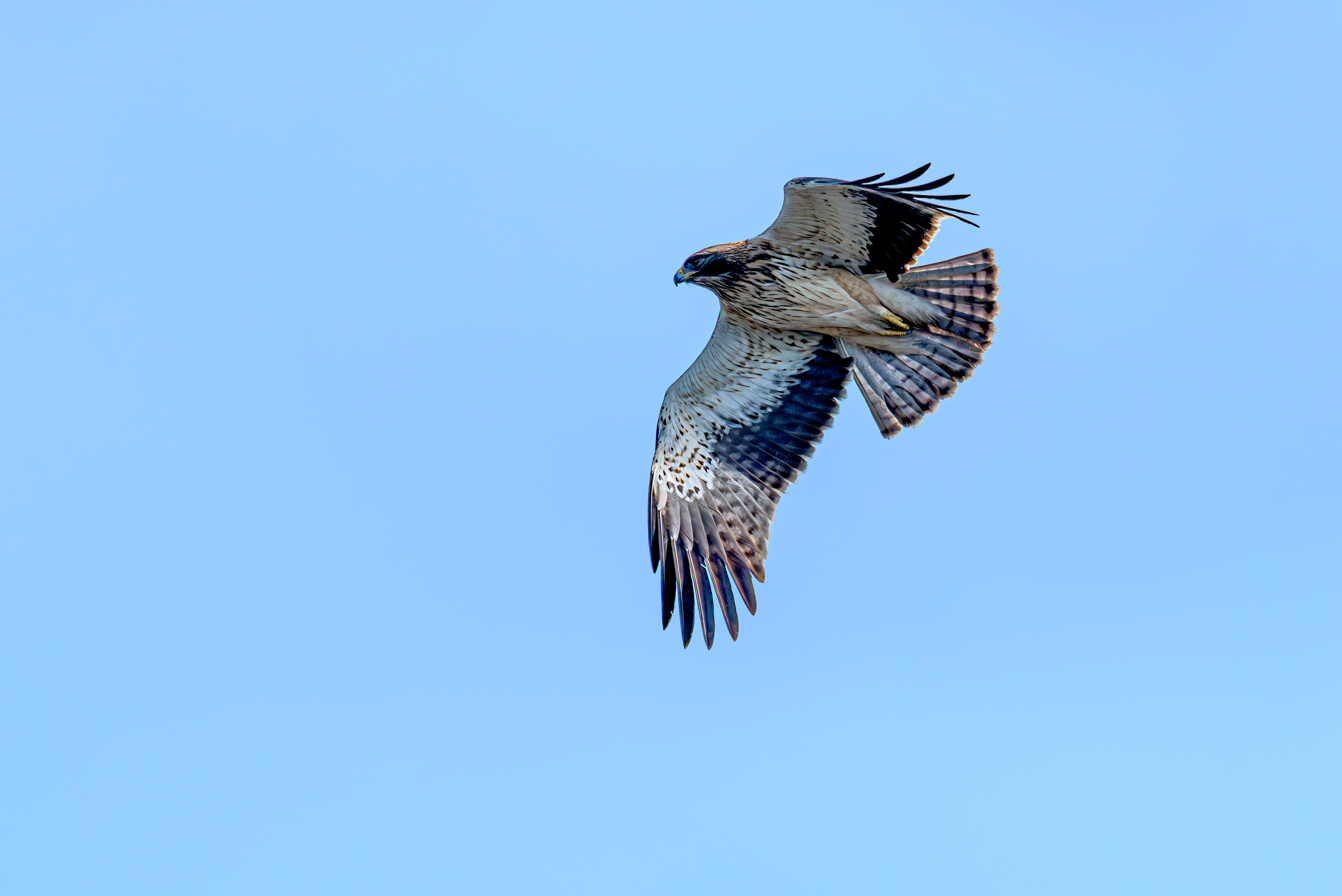
Booted eagle, Riserva naturale San Cataldo, Apulia

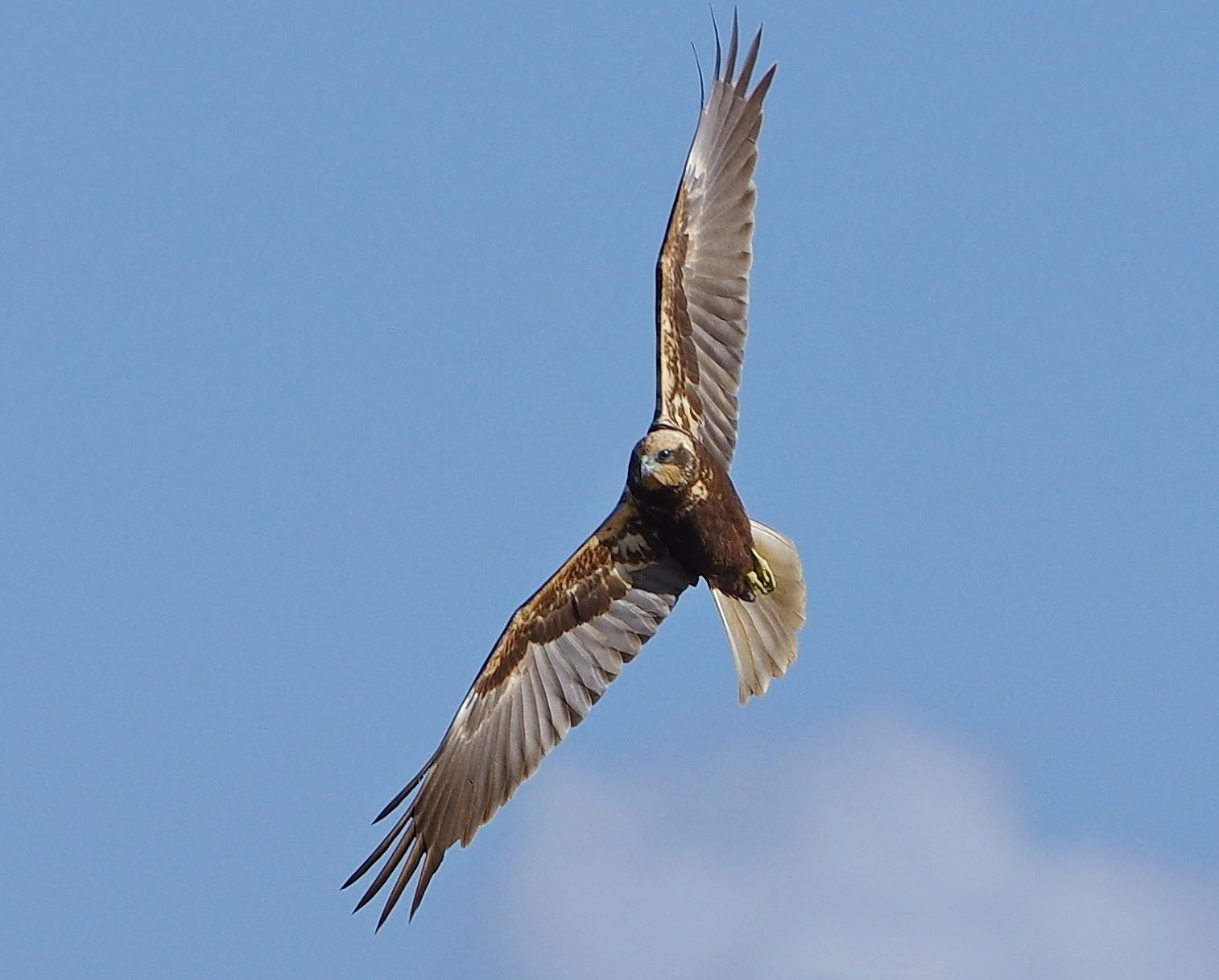
Western marsh harrier, Riserva naturale di Torre Flavia, Ladispoli

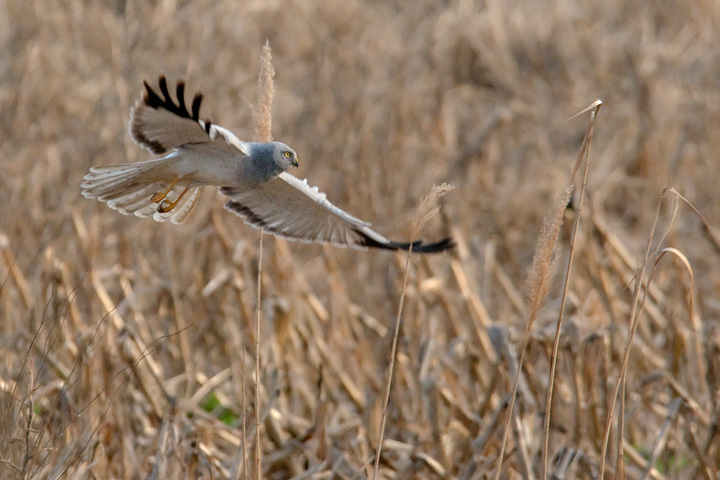
Hen harrier

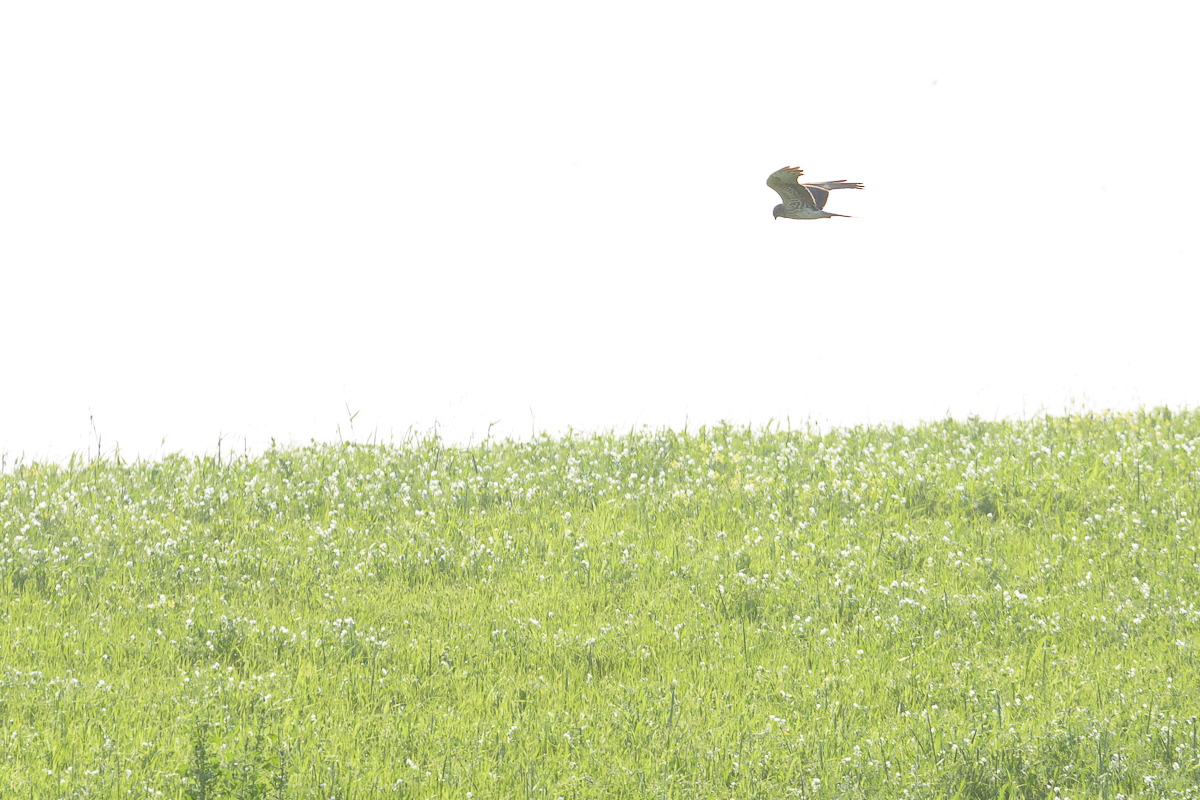
Montagu's harrier, Mignone, Lazio

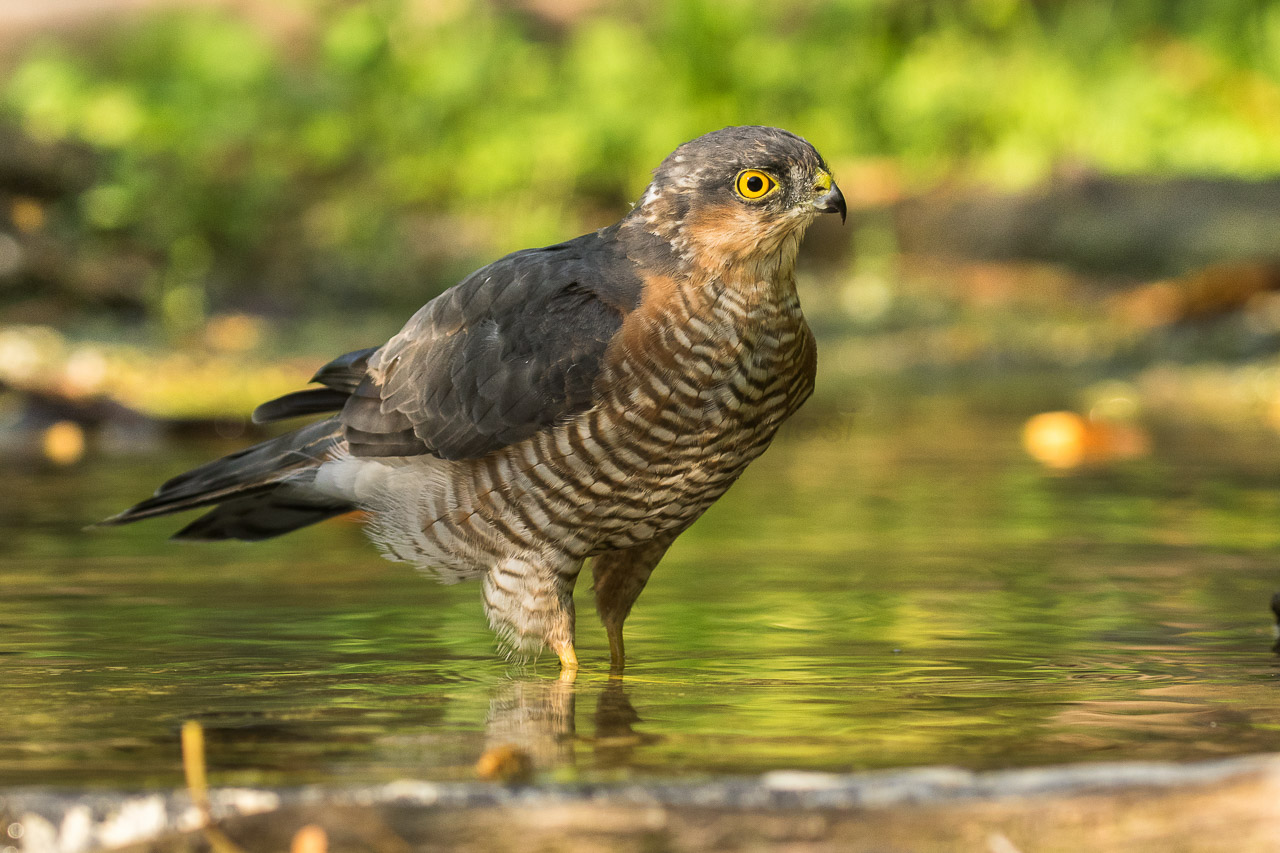
Eurasian sparrowhawk, Castelletto Merli, Piedmont

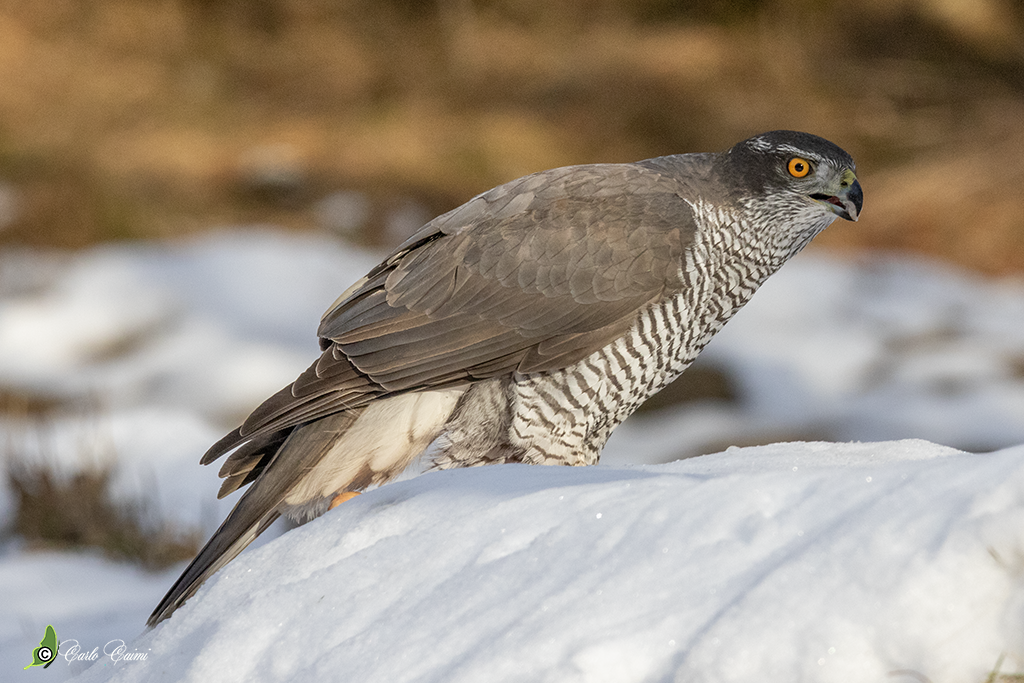
Eurasian goshawk, Veneto

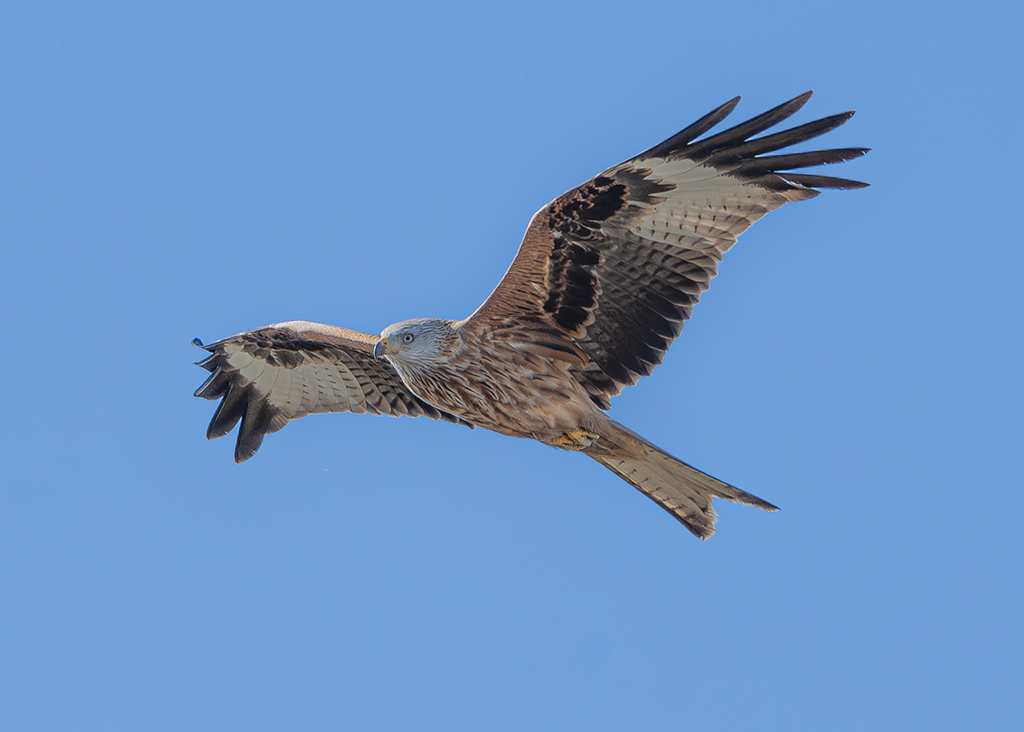
Red kite, Novara, Piedmont

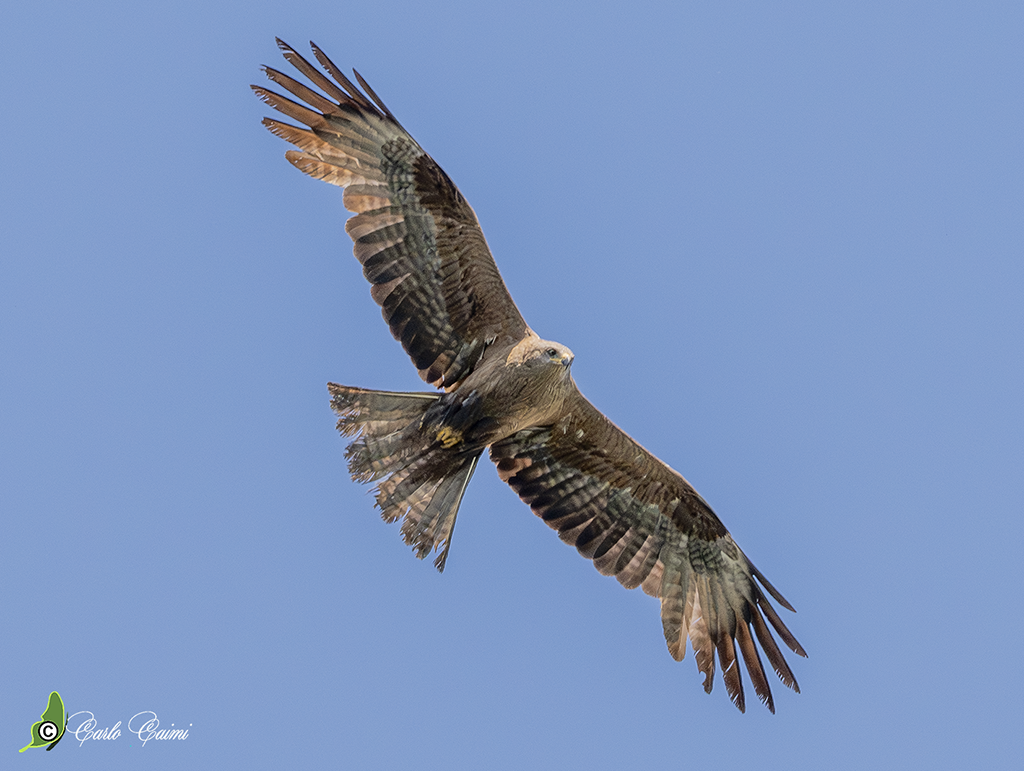
Black kite, Gorla Maggiore, Lombardy

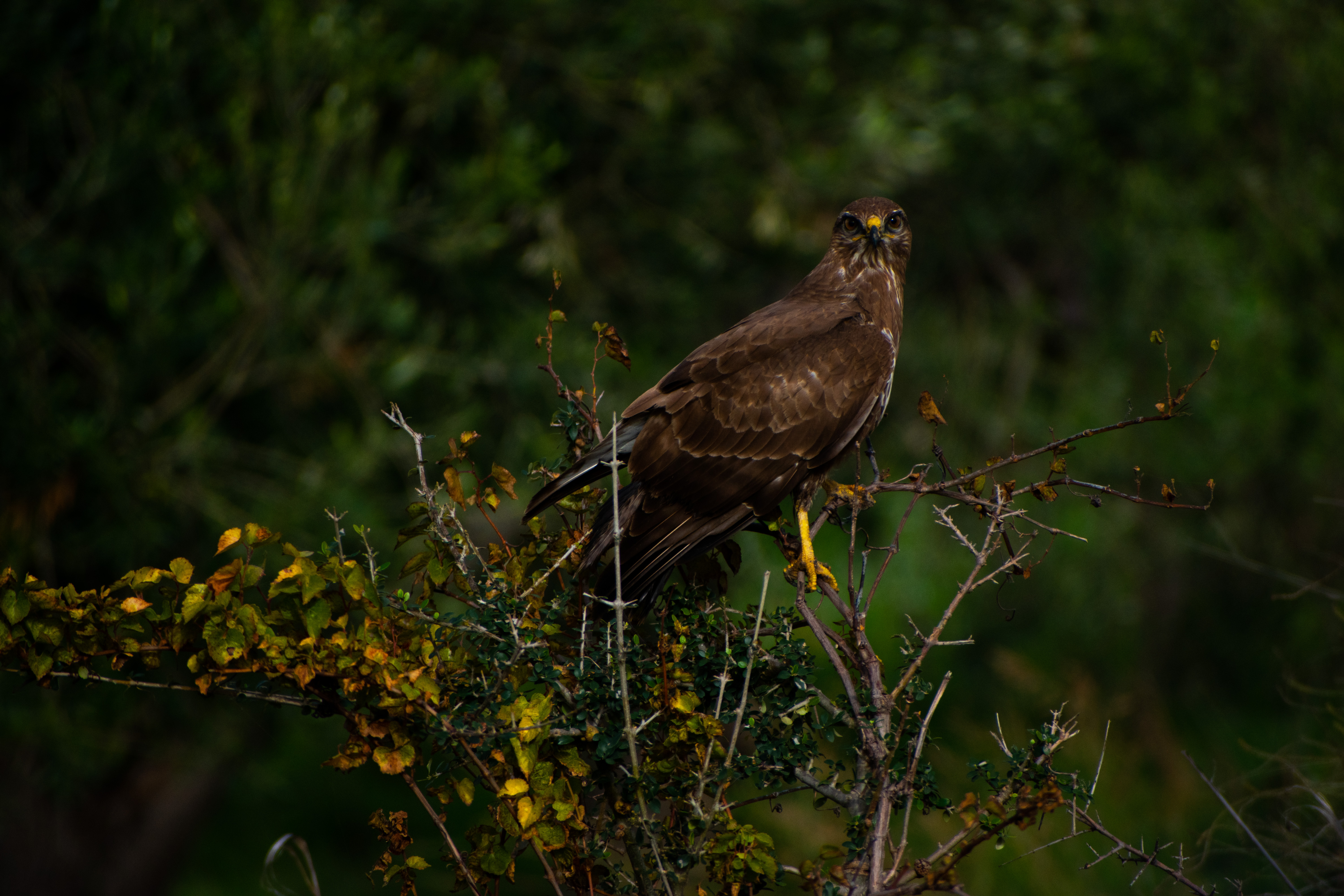
Common buzzard, Geloi Wetland, Gela, Sicily

== Hoopoes ==
Order: Bucerotiformes Family: Upupidae

Hoopoes have black, white and orangey-pink colours with a large erectile crest on their head.

- Eurasian hoopoe Upupa epops Upupa – A
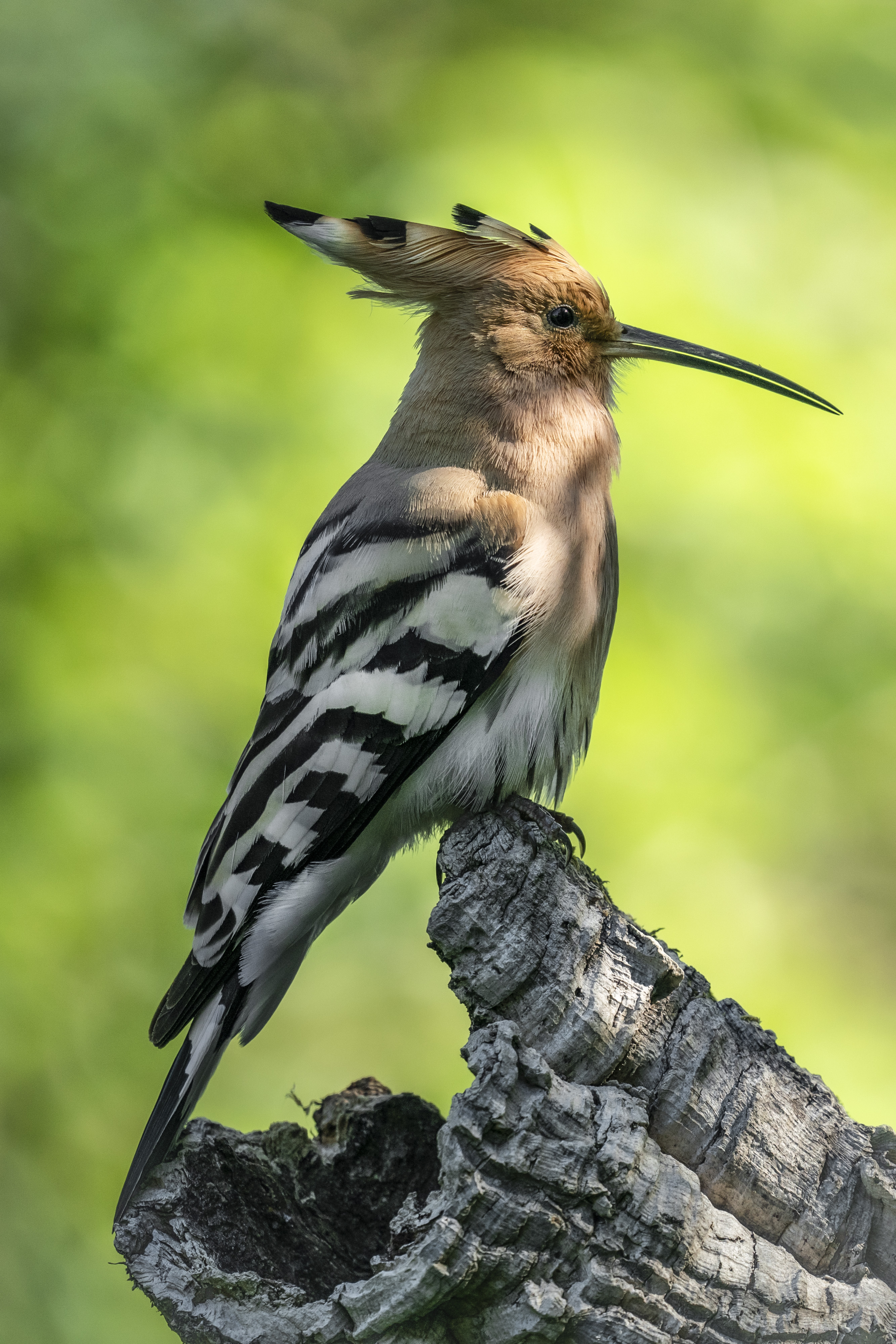
Eurasian hoopoe, Tuscany

== Bee-eaters ==
Order: Coraciiformes Family: Meropidae

The bee-eaters are a group of coraciiform birds in the family Meropidae. The species are found in Africa, southern Europe, Madagascar, Australia and New Guinea. They are characterised by richly coloured plumage, slender bodies and usually elongated central tail feathers. All have long downturned bills and pointed wings, which give them a swallow-like appearance when seen from afar.

- Blue-cheeked bee-eater Merops persicus Gruccione egiziano – A
- European bee-eater Merops apiaster Gruccione – A
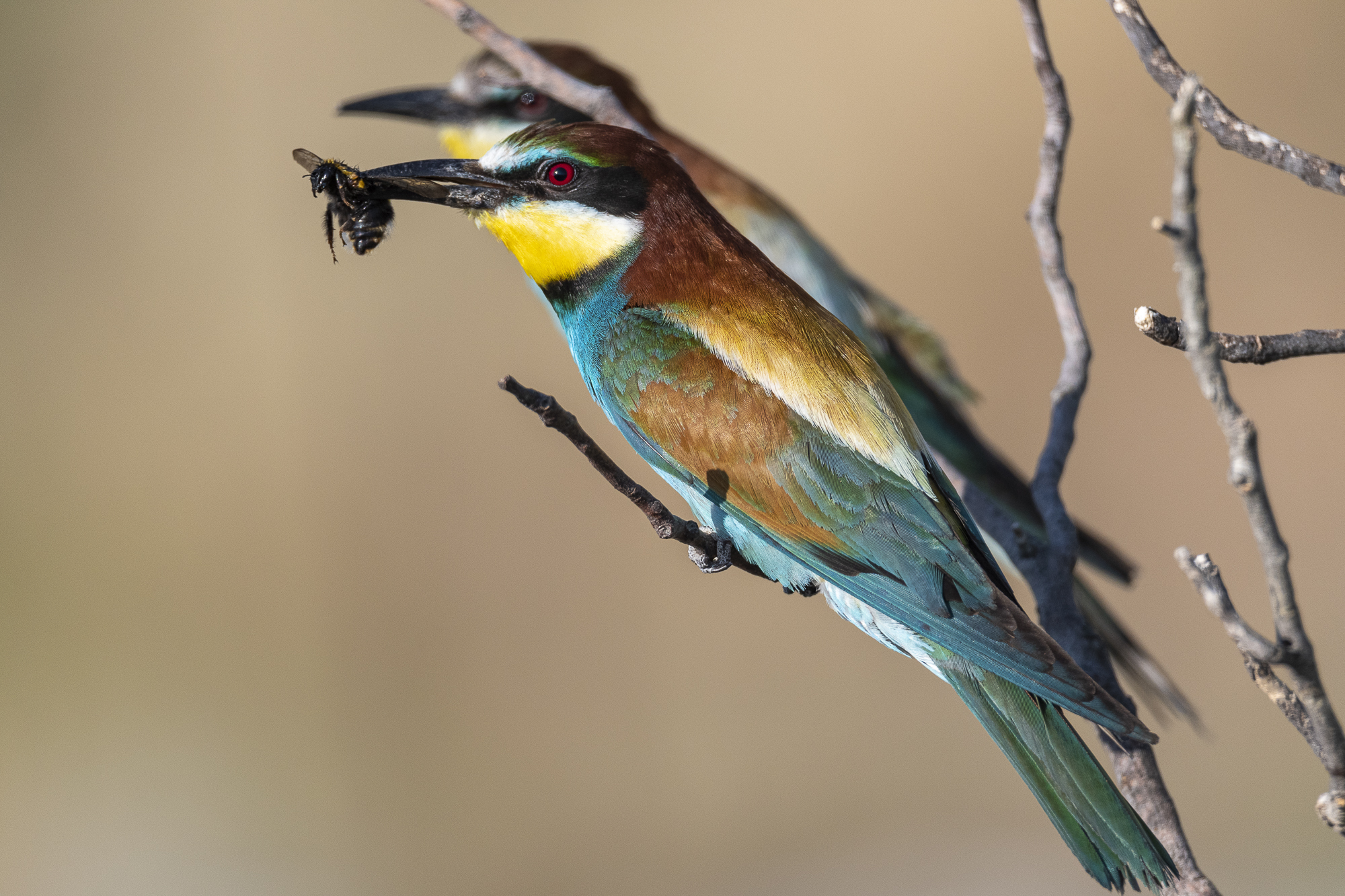
European bee-eaters, National Park, Matera

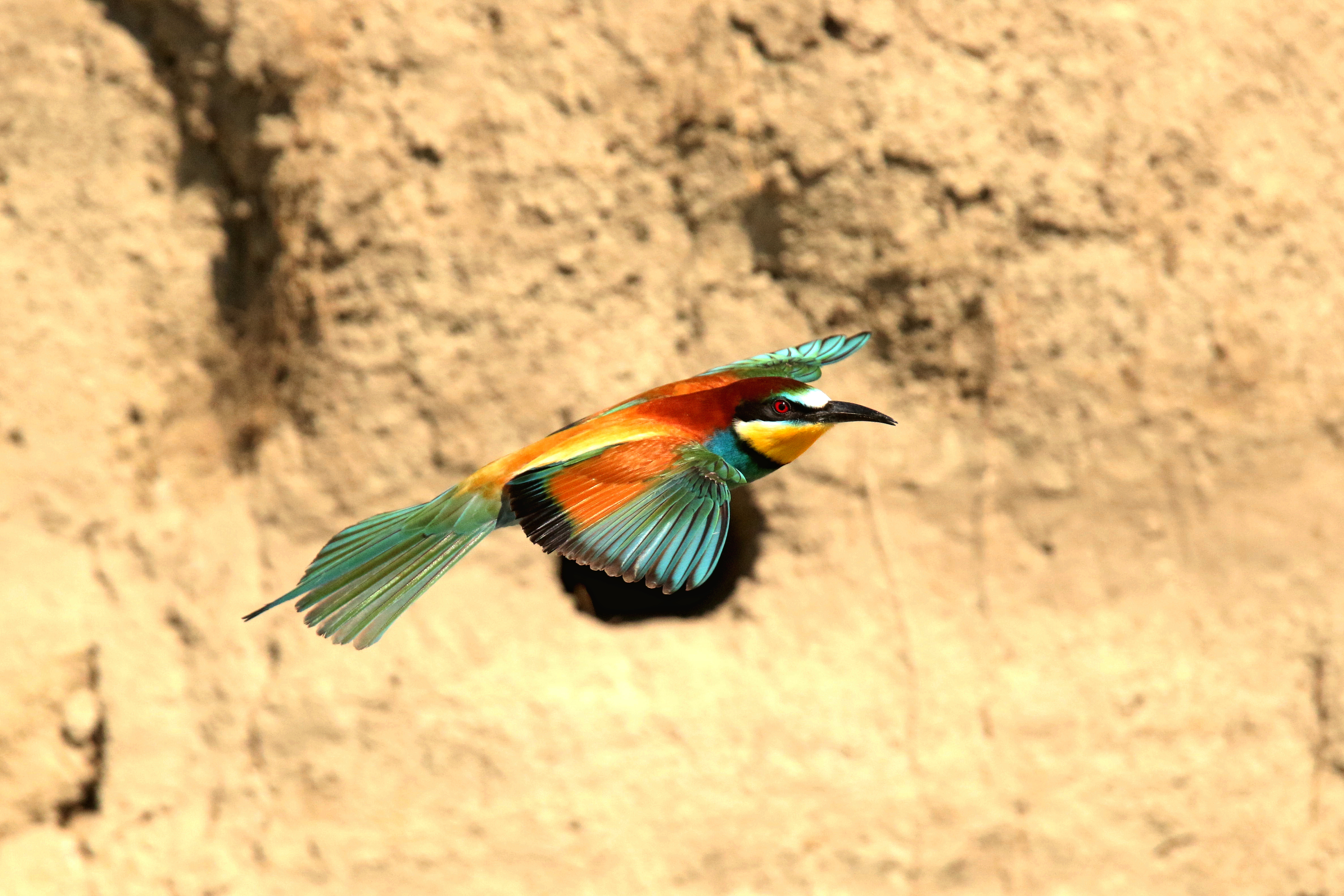
European bee-eater, Scrivia

== Rollers ==
Order: Coraciiformes Family: Coraciidae

Rollers resemble jays in size and build, but are more closely related to the kingfishers and bee-eaters. They share the colourful appearance of those groups with blues and browns predominating. The two inner front toes are connected, but the outer toe is not.

- European roller Coracias garrulus Ghiandaia marina – A
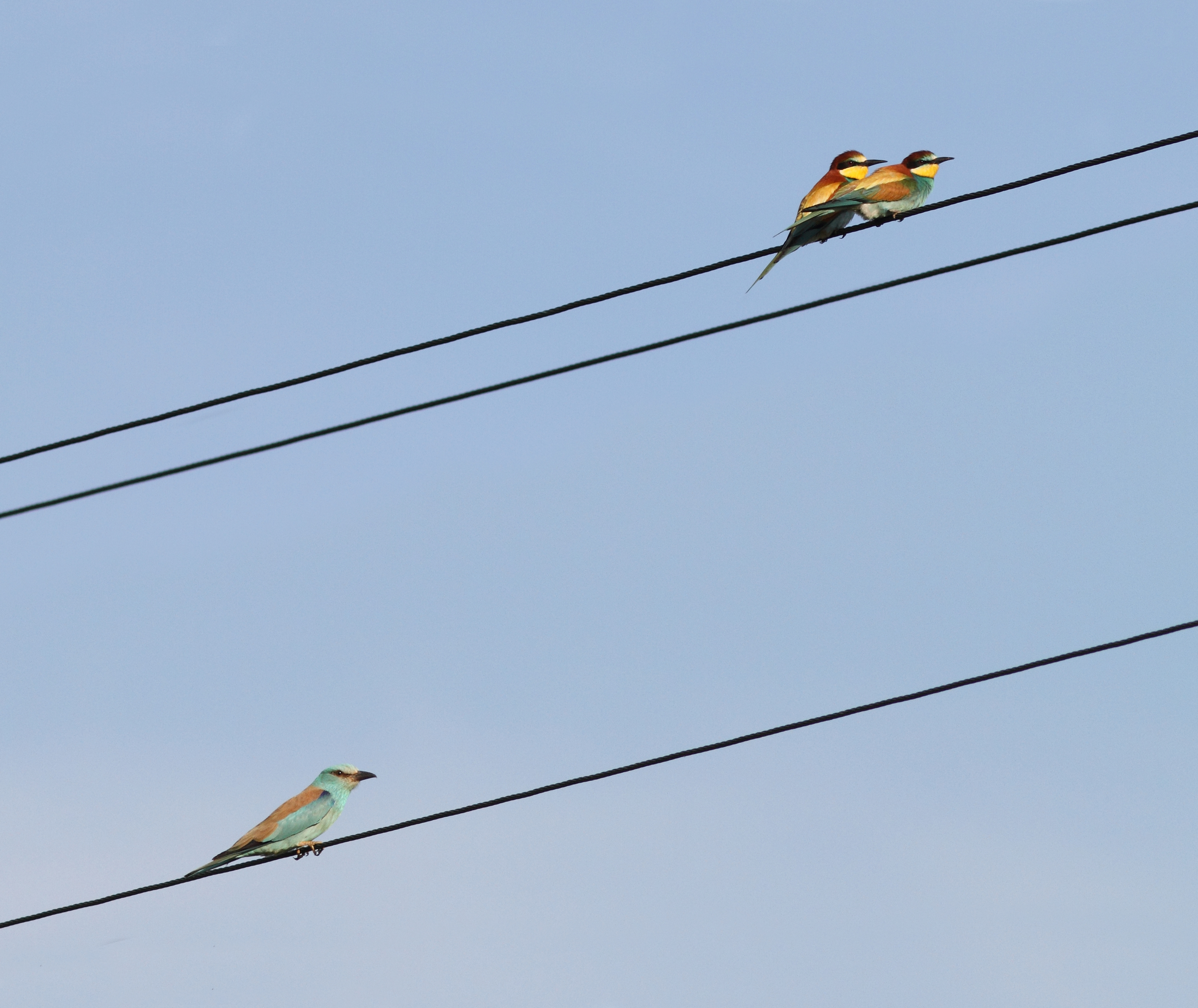
European roller with European bee-eaters, Maremma Regional Park, Tuscany

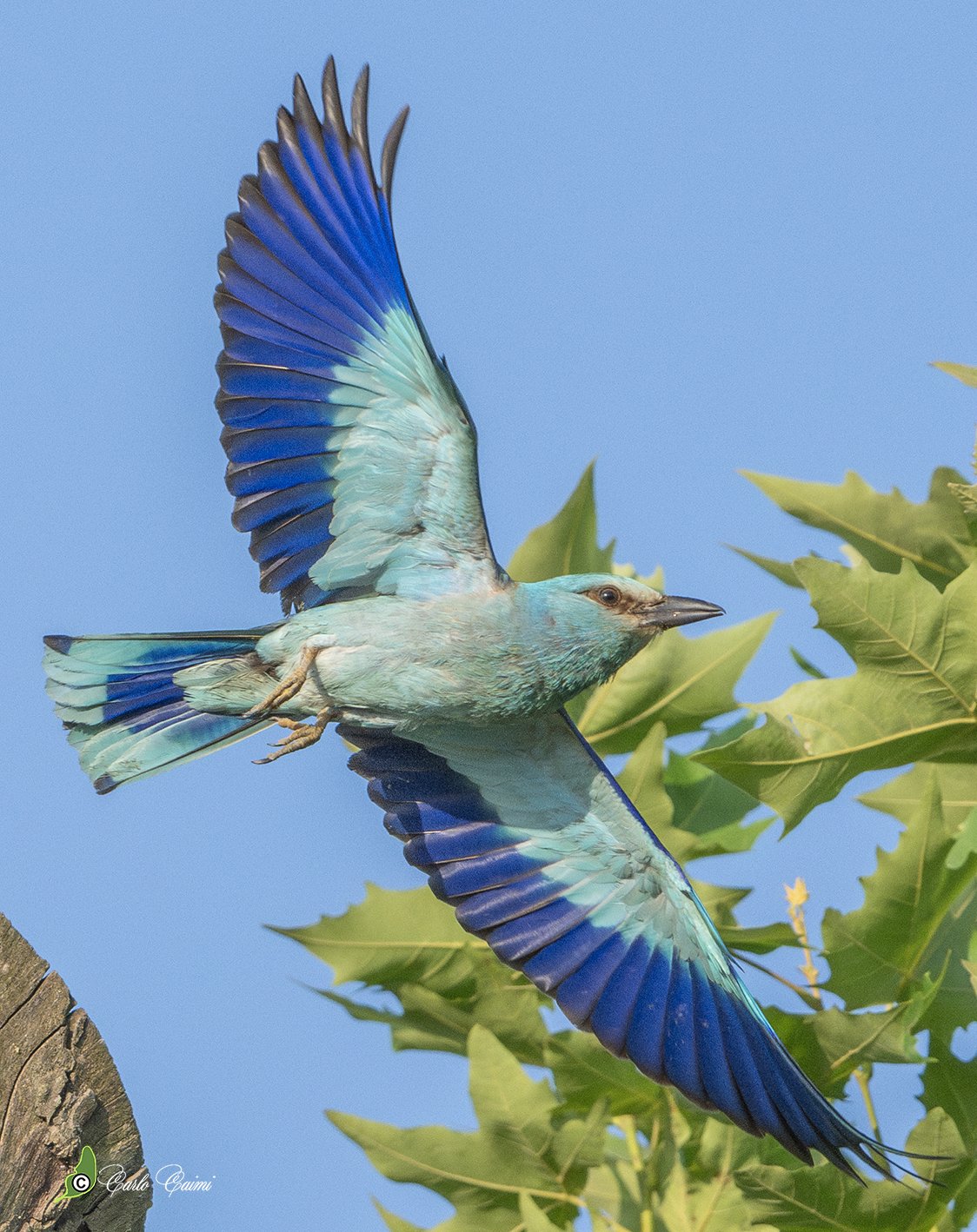
European roller, Padua, Veneto

== Kingfishers ==
Order: Coraciiformes Family: Alcedinidae

Kingfishers are small to medium-sized birds with large heads, long, pointed bills, short legs and stubby tails. The two inner front toes are connected, but the outer toe is not.

- Common kingfisher Alcedo atthis Martin pescatore – A
- Pied kingfisher Ceryle rudis Martin pescatore bianconero – A
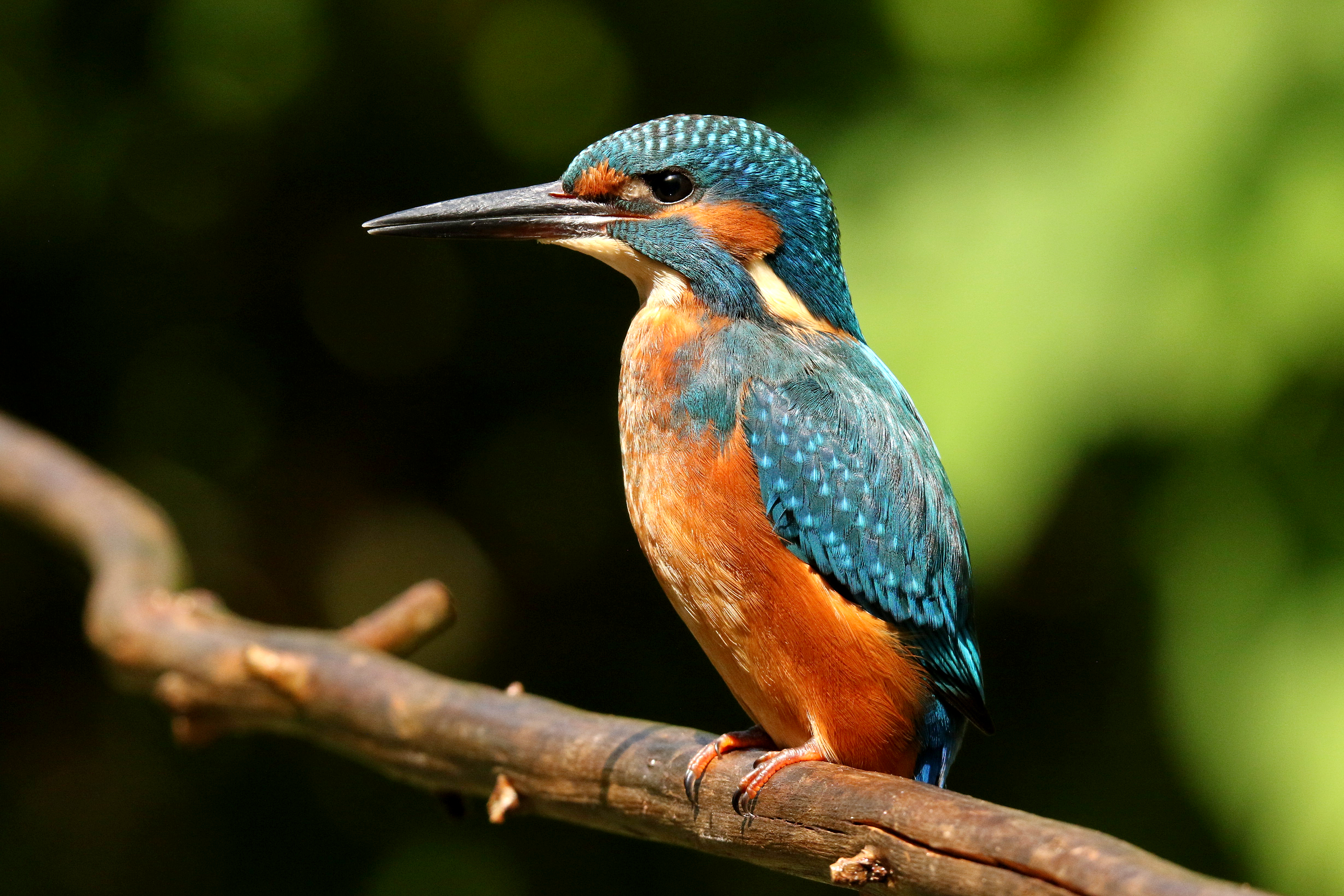
Common kingfisher, Scrivia

== Woodpeckers ==
Order: Piciformes Family: Picidae

Woodpeckers are small to medium-sized birds with chisel-like beaks, short legs, stiff tails and long tongues used for capturing insects in holes. Most have feet with two toes pointing forward and two backward, but a few have only three toes. Many woodpeckers have the habit of "drumming" noisily on tree trunks with their beaks.

- Eurasian wryneck Jynx torquilla Torcicollo – A
- Grey-headed woodpecker Picus canus Picchio cenerino – A
- Eurasian green woodpecker Picus viridis Picchio verde – A
- Black woodpecker Dryocopus martius Picchio nero – A
- Eurasian three-toed woodpecker Picoides tridactylus Picchio tridattilo – A
- Middle spotted woodpecker Dendrocoptes medius Picchio rosso mezzano – A
- Lesser spotted woodpecker Dryobates minor Picchio rosso minore – A
- White-backed woodpecker Dendrocopos leucotos Picchio dorsobianco – A
- Great spotted woodpecker Dendrocopos major Picchio rosso maggiore – A
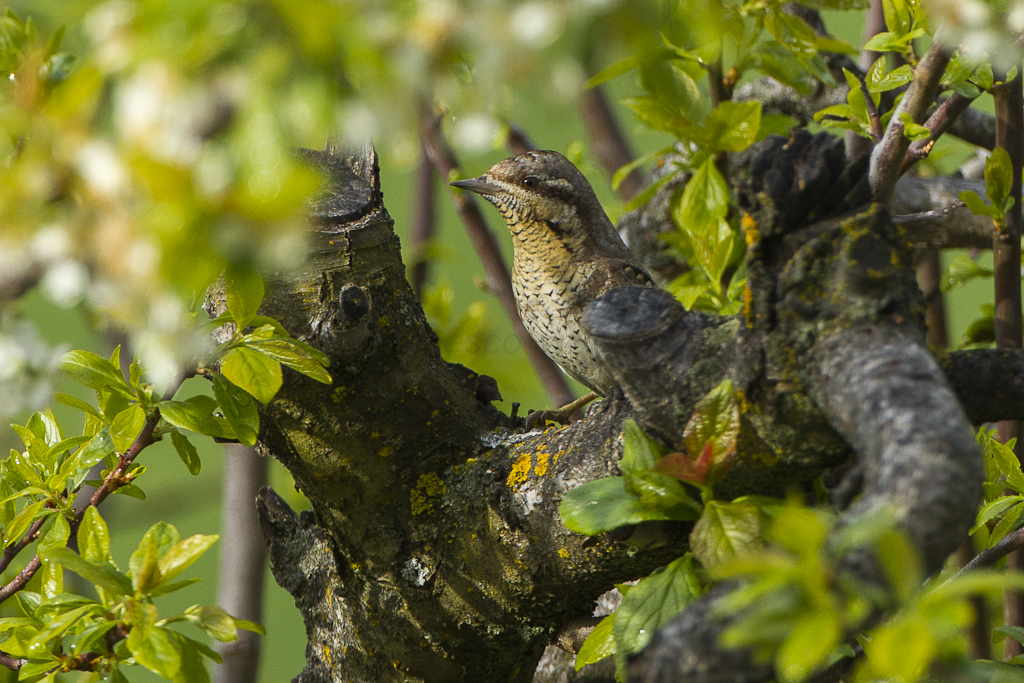
Eurasian wryneck, Aosta Valley

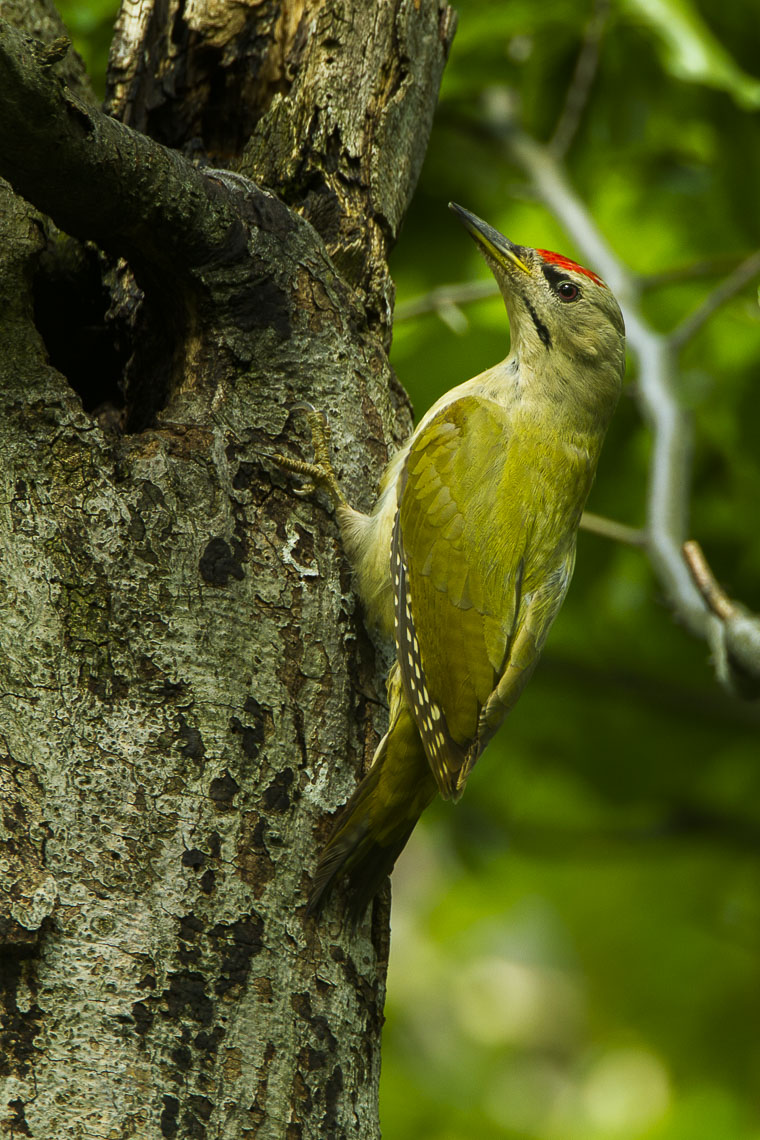
Grey-headed woodpecker, Italy

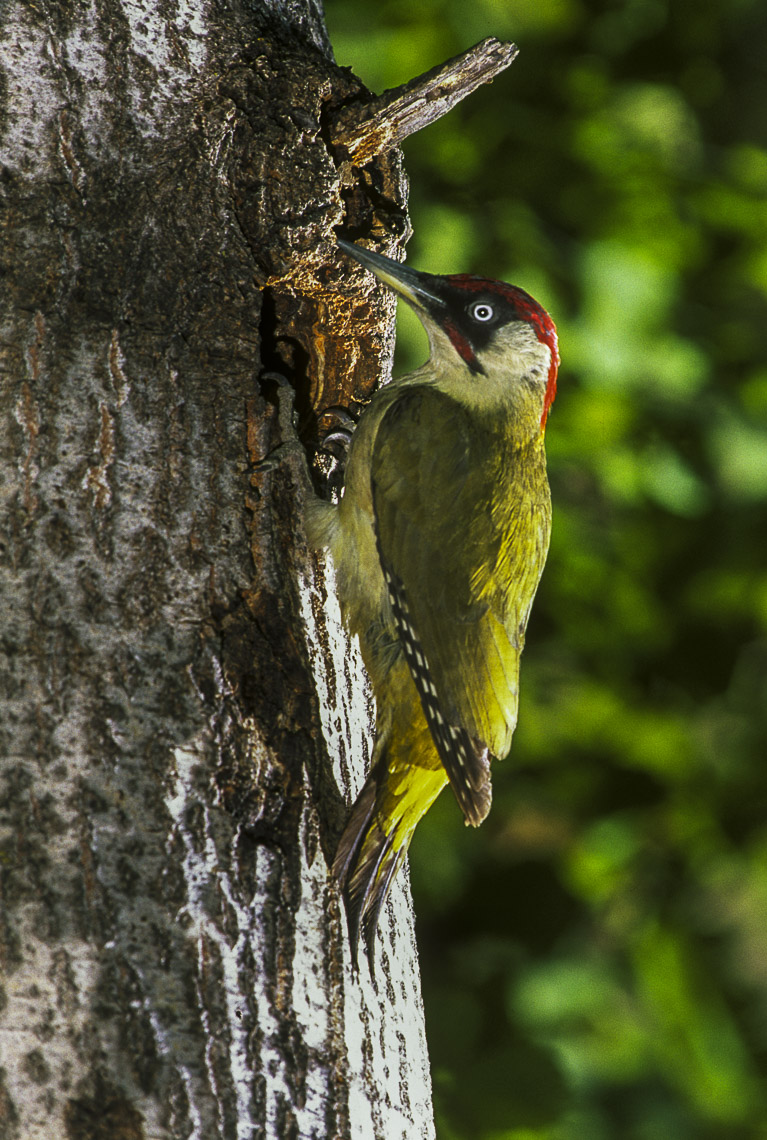
Eurasian green woodpecker, Aosta Valley

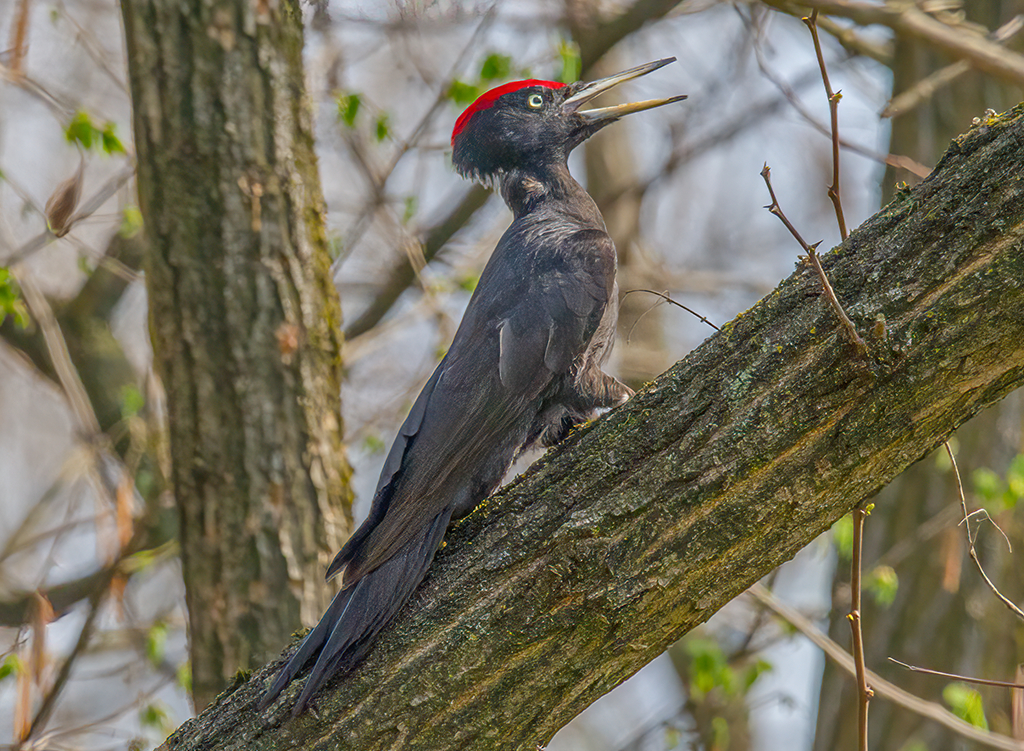
Black woodpecker, Origgio, Lombardy

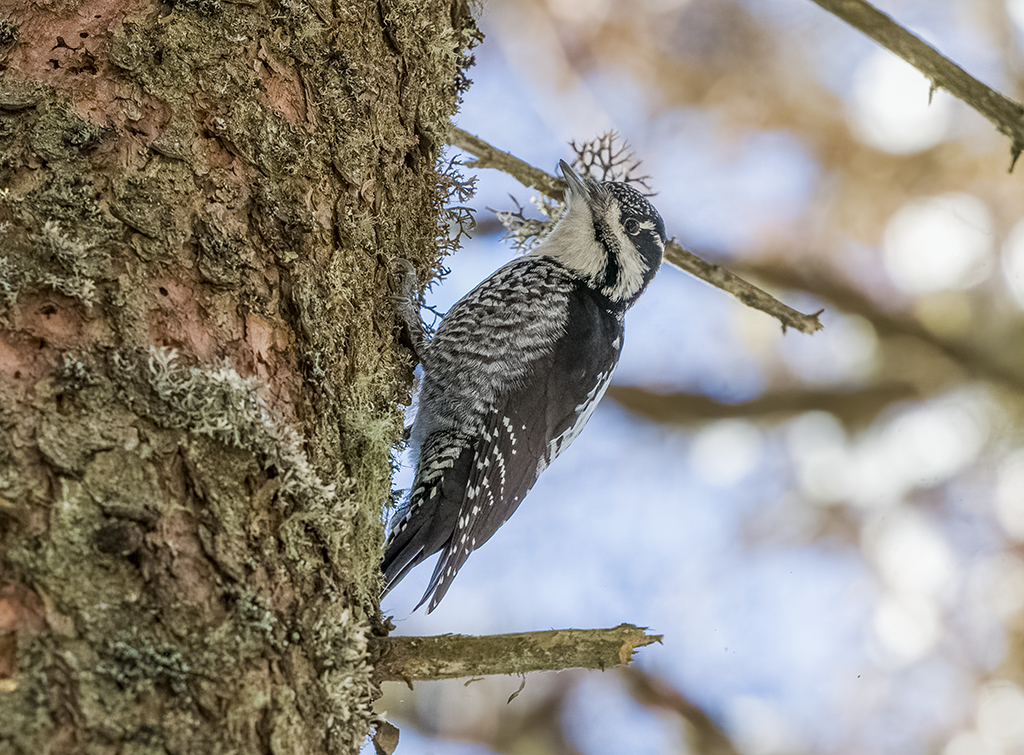
Eurasian three-toed woodpecker, Puster Valley

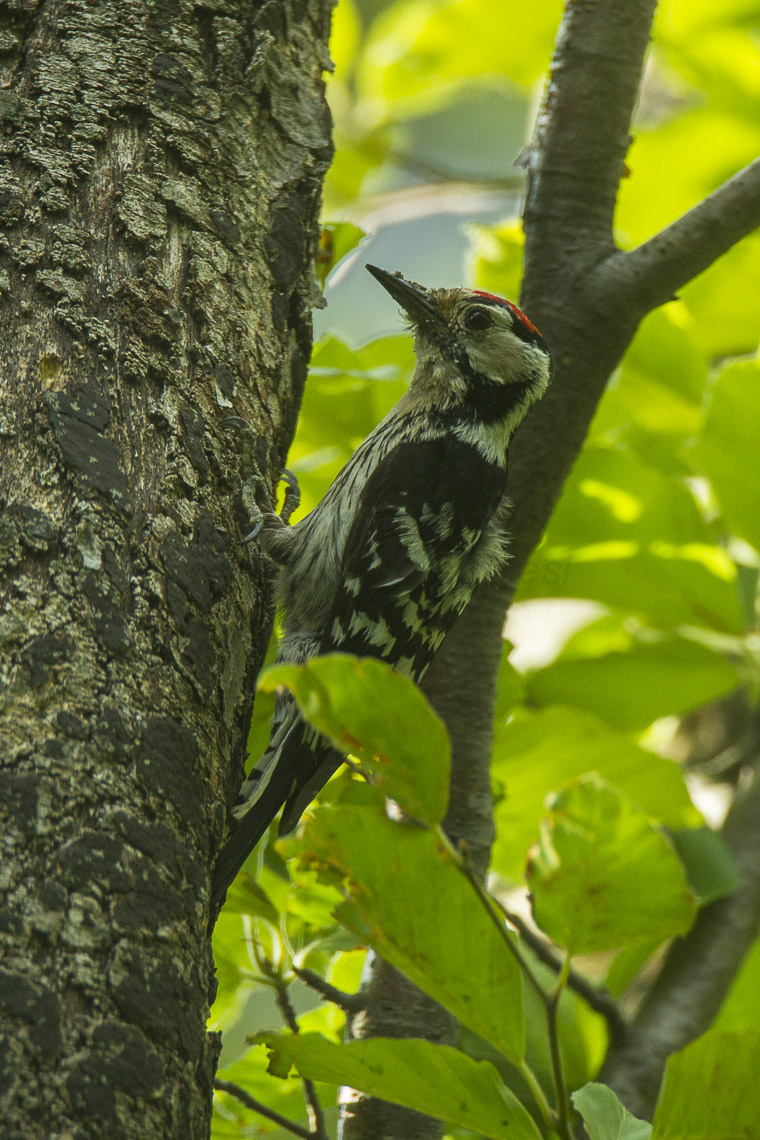
Lesser spotted woodpecker, Italy

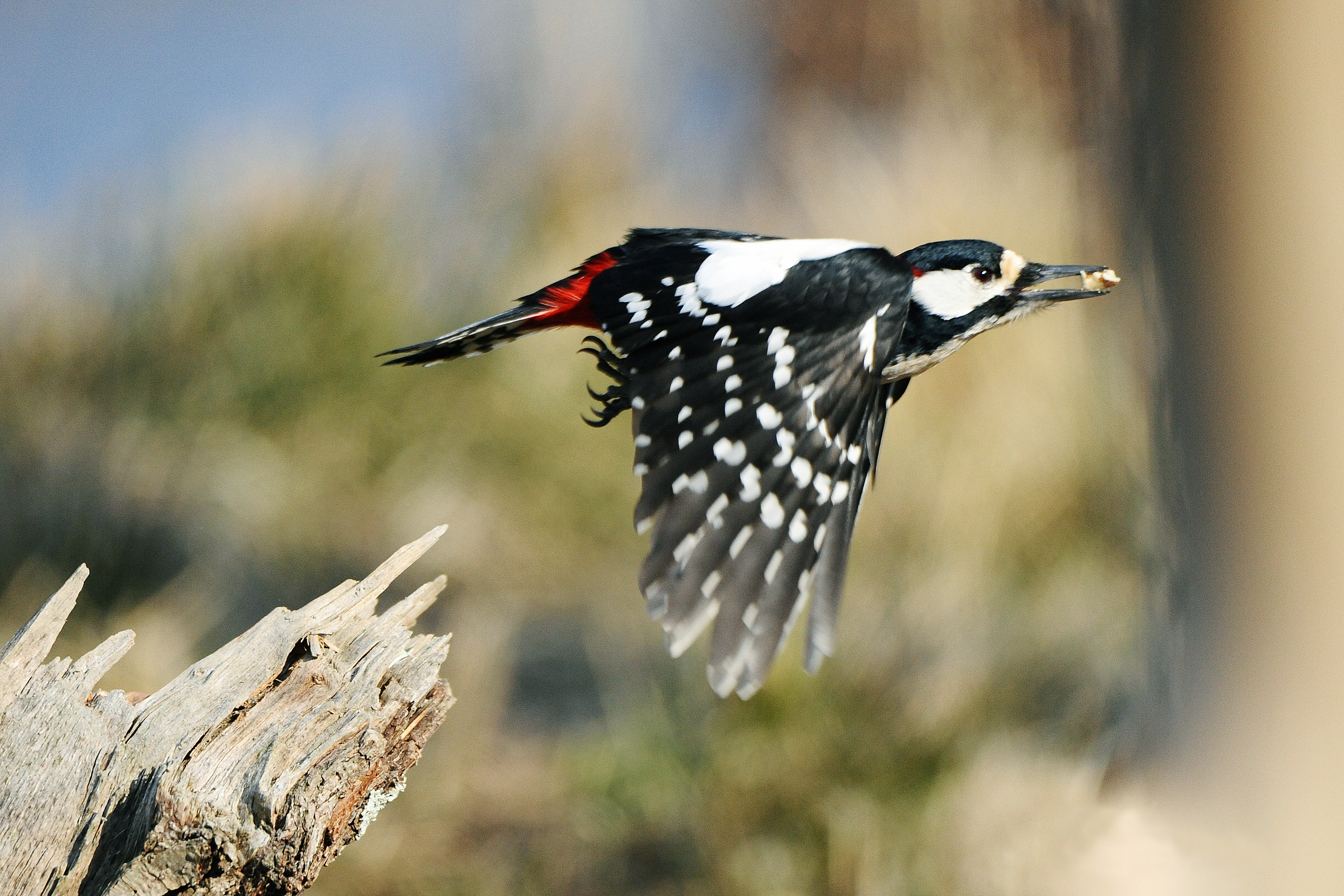
Great spotted woodpecker (subspecies Dendrocopos major italiae)

== Falcons ==
Order: Falconiformes Family: Falconidae

Falconidae is a family of diurnal birds of prey. They differ from hawks, eagles and kites in that they have a tomial notch on the bill, and other structural differences; they are not closely related.

- Lesser kestrel Falco naumanni Grillaio – A
- Eurasian kestrel Falco tinnunculus Gheppio – A
- Red-footed falcon Falco vespertinus Falco cuculo – A
- Amur falcon Falco amurensis Falco dell'Amur – A
- Eleonora's falcon Falco eleonorae Falco della regina – A
- Sooty falcon Falco concolor Falco unicolore – A
- Merlin Falco columbarius Smeriglio – A
- Eurasian hobby Falco subbuteo Lodolaio – A
- Lanner falcon Falco biarmicus Lanario – A
- Saker falcon Falco cherrug Sacro – A
- Peregrine falcon Falco peregrinus Falco pellegrino – A
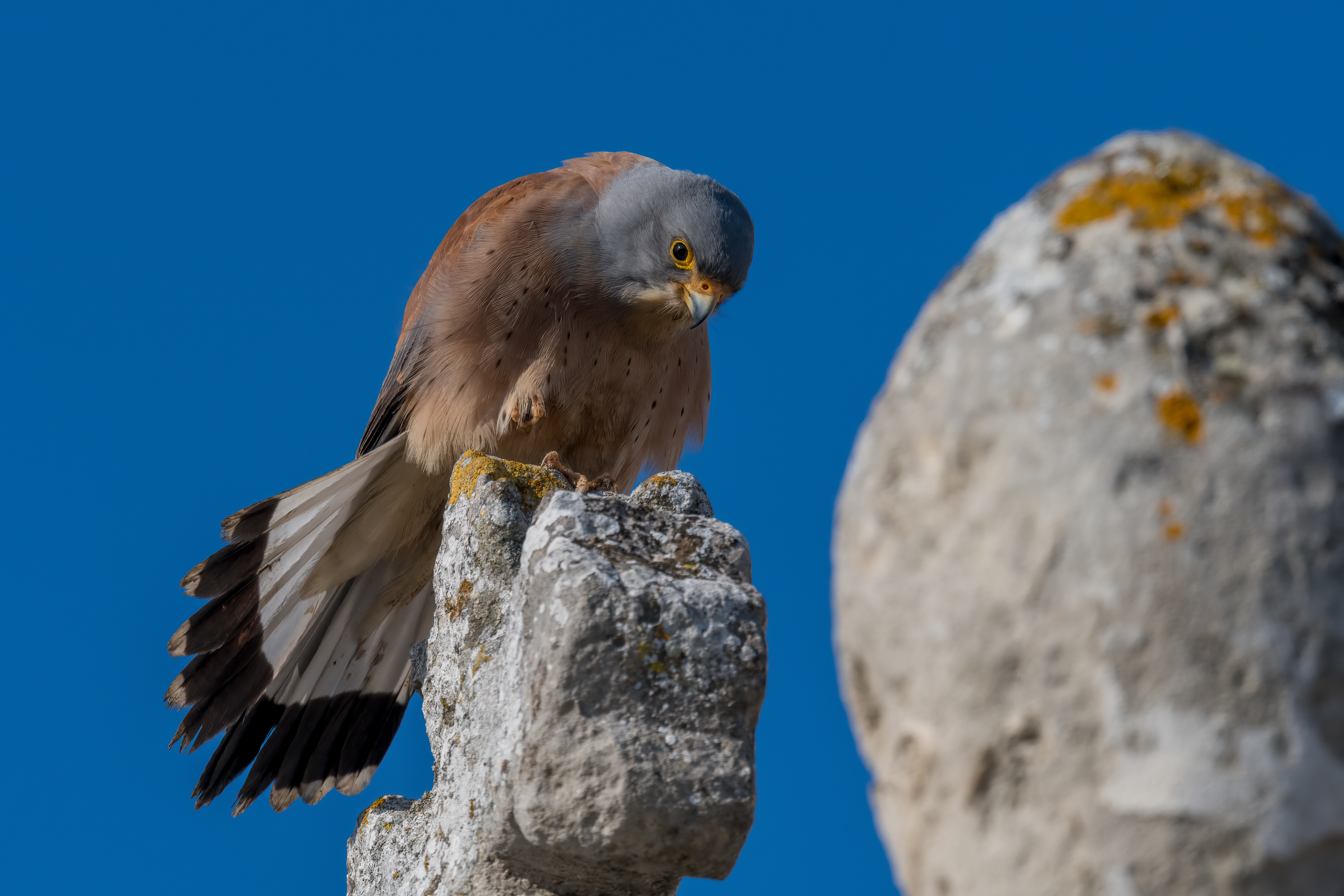
Lesser kestrel, Matera

Eurasian kestrel, Inghiaie, Trentino

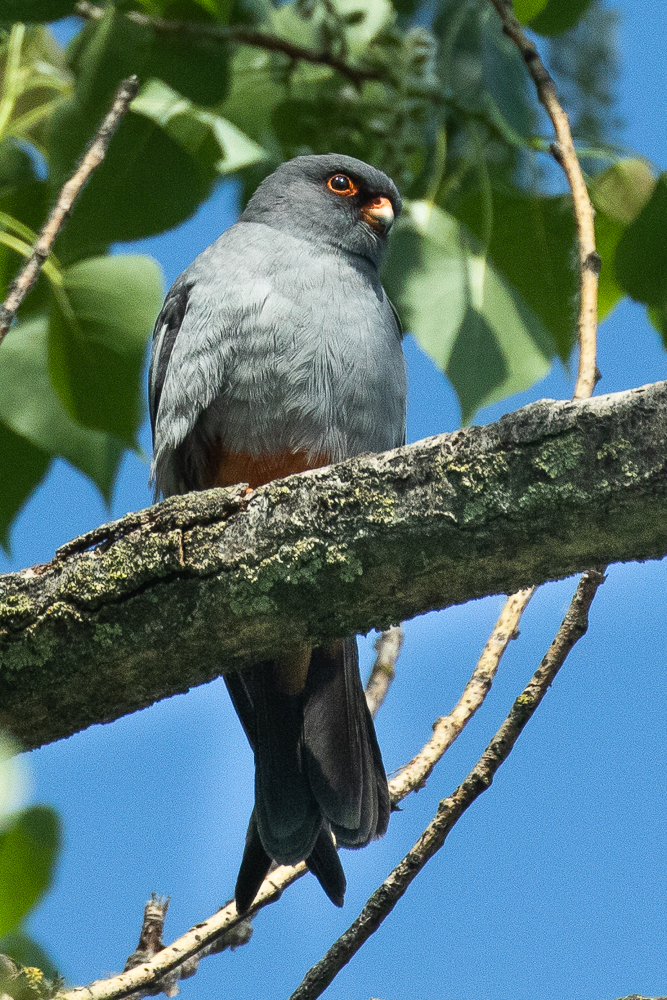
Red-footed falcon, near Parma

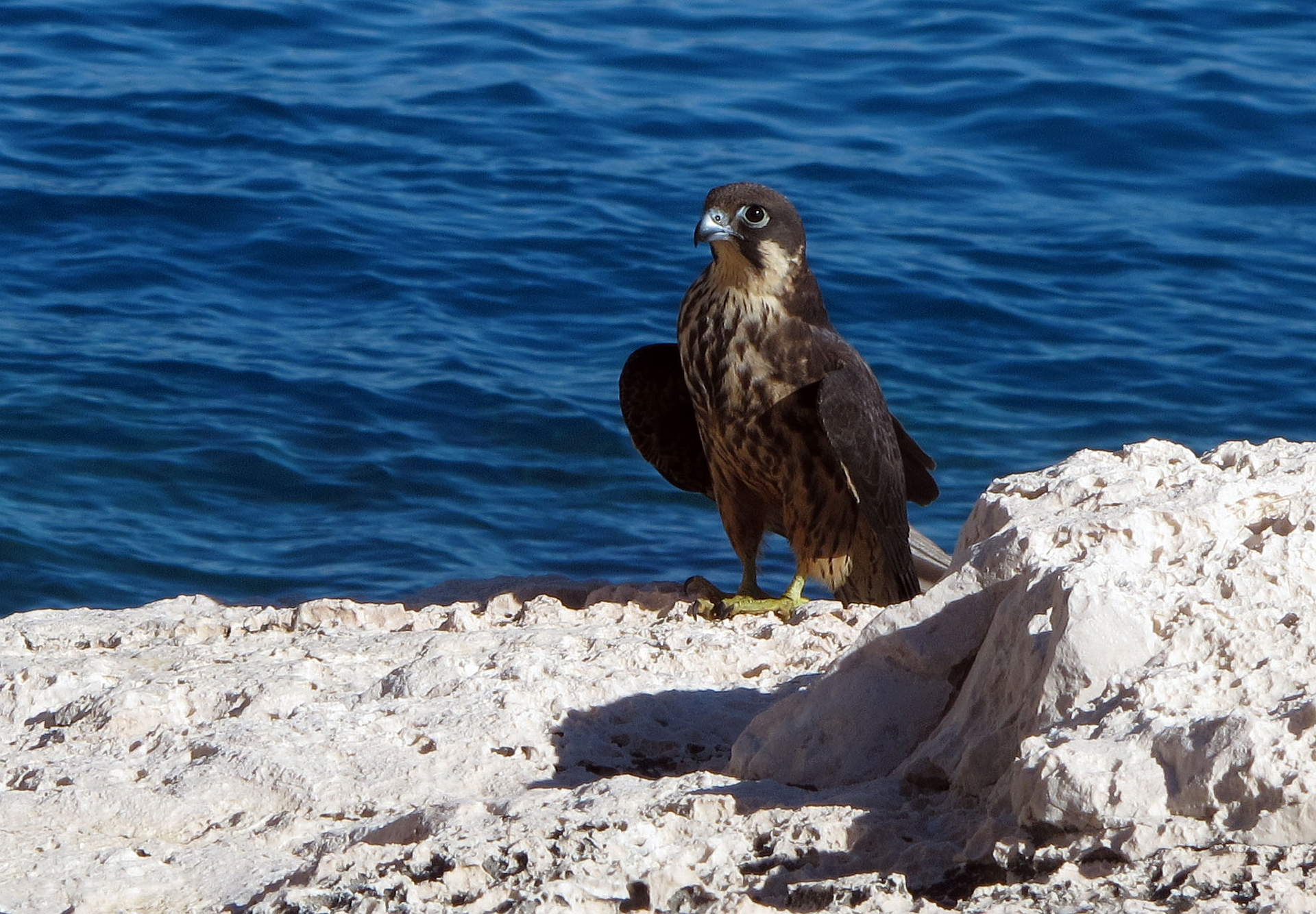
Eleonora's falcon, Sardinia

== Parrots ==
Order: Psittaciformes Family: Psittacidae (including Psittaculidae)

Characteristic features of parrots include a strong curved bill, strong legs, and clawed zygodactyl feet. Many parrots are vividly coloured, and some are multi-coloured. In size they range from 8 cm (3.1 in) to 1 m (3.3 ft) in length. None are native in Italy, but two species have expanding feral populations derived from escaped pets. Note: in the HBW/BLI taxonomy, Psittaculidae is included in Psittacidae.

- Monk parakeet Myiopsitta monachus Parrocchetto monaco – C
- Rose-ringed parakeet Psittacula krameri Parrocchetto dal collare – C
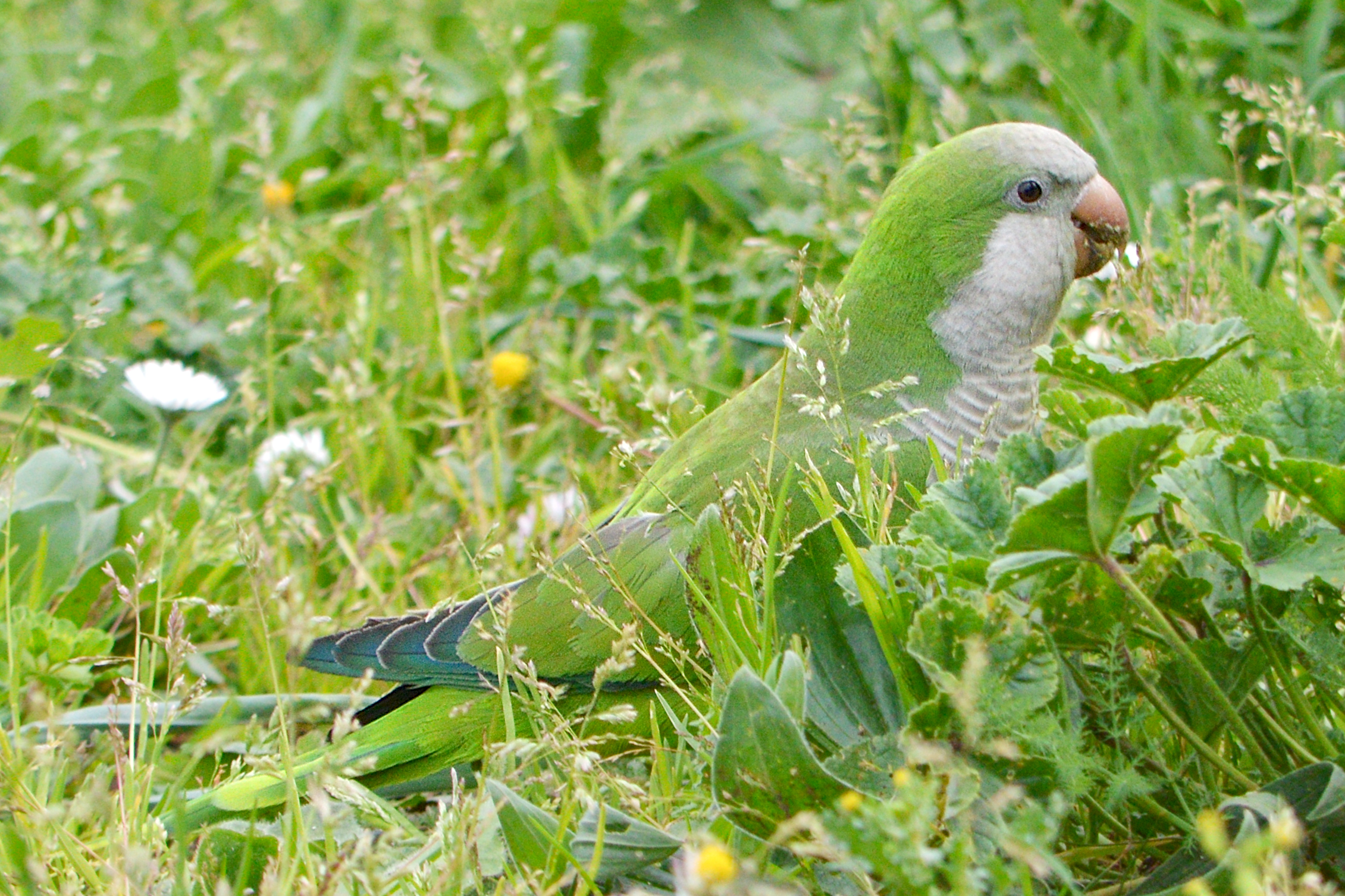
Monk parakeet, Rome

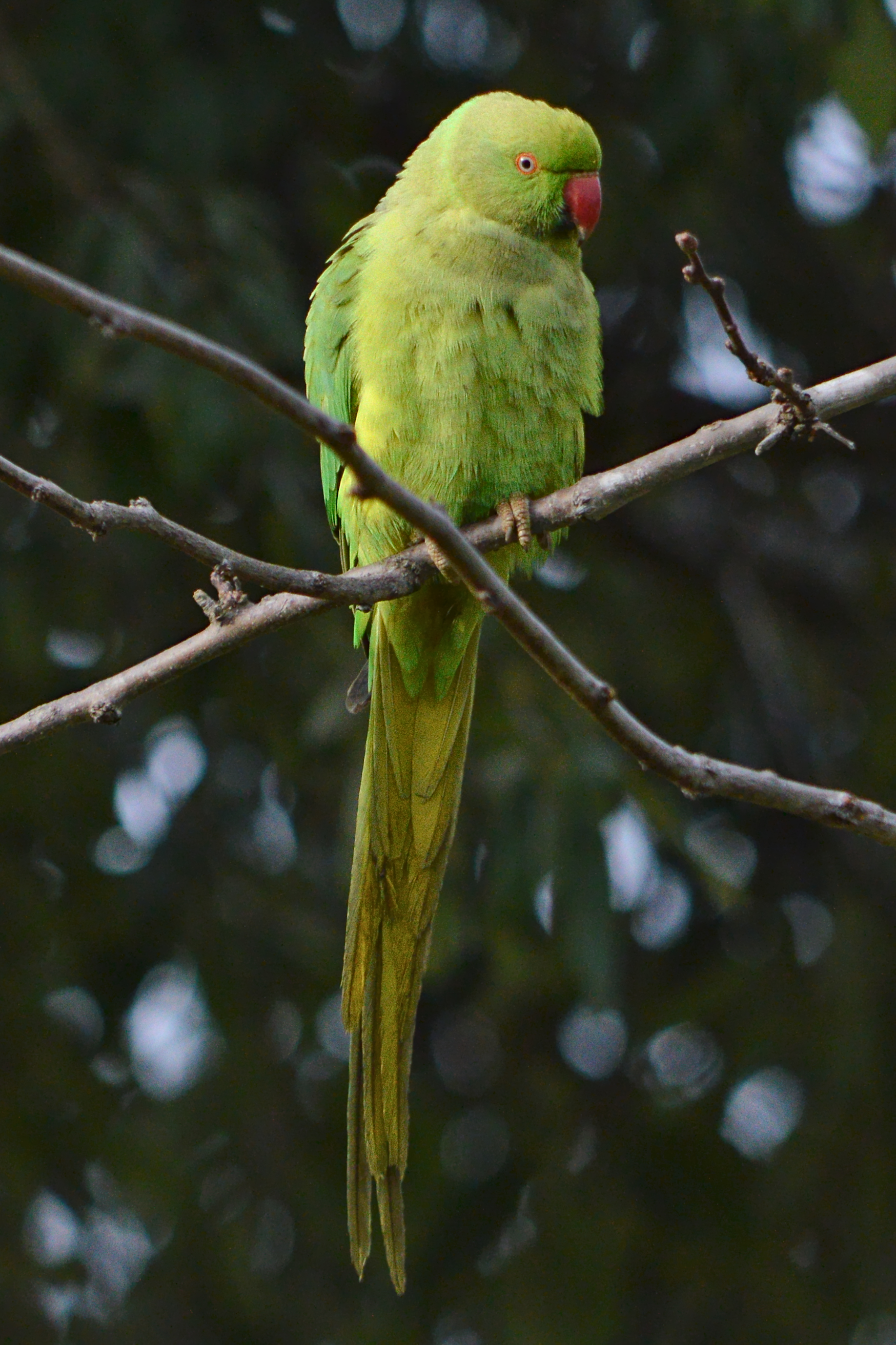
Rose-ringed parakeet, Rome

== Old World orioles ==
Order: Passeriformes Family: Oriolidae

The Old World orioles are colourful passerine birds. They are not related to the New World orioles.

- Eurasian golden oriole Oriolus oriolus Rigogolo – A
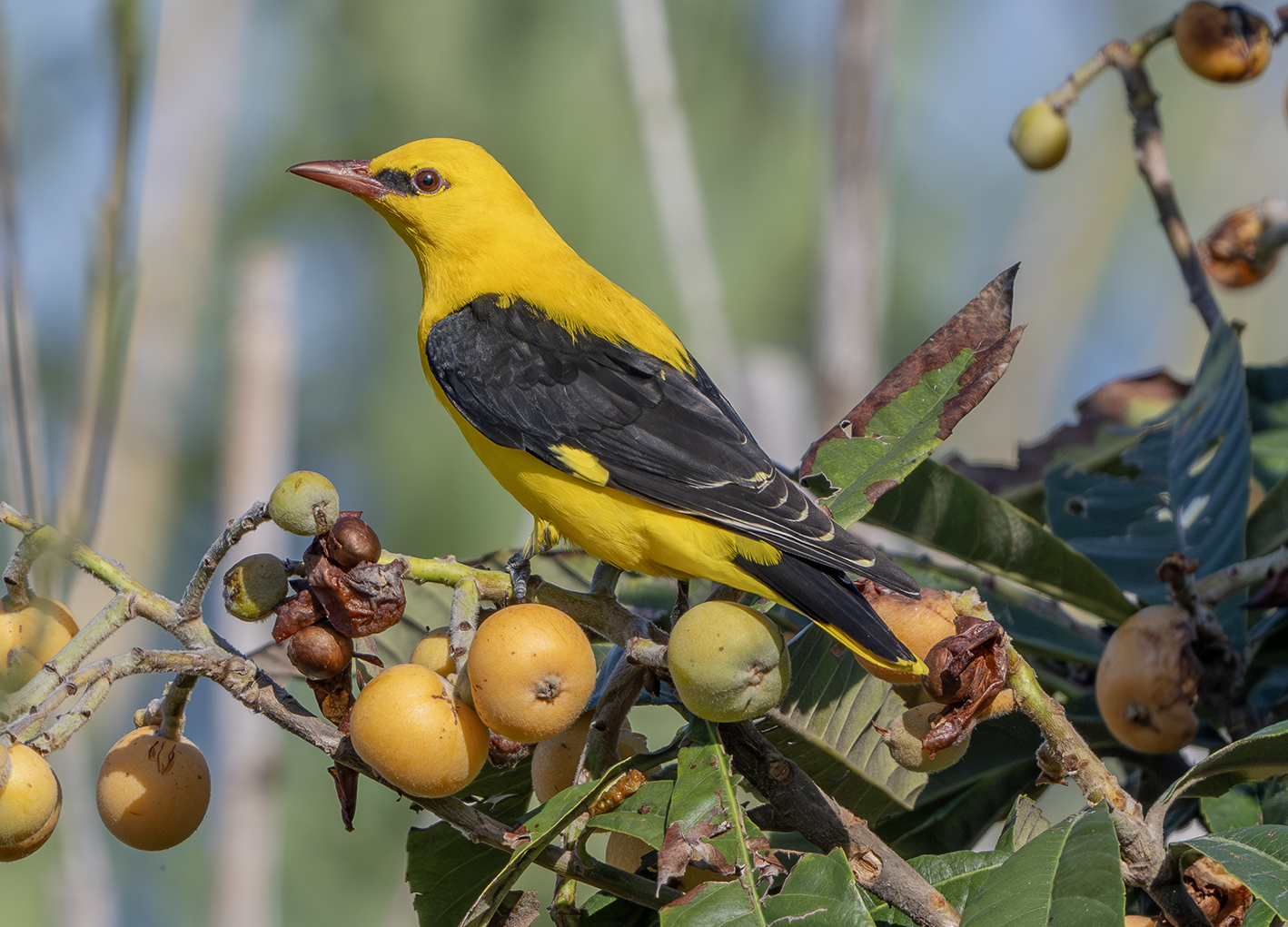
Eurasian golden oriole, Ventotene, Lazio

== Vireos, shrike-babblers, and erpornis ==
Order: Passeriformes Family: Vireonidae

The vireos are a group of small to medium-sized passerine birds restricted to the New World and southeast Asia; one New World species is a vagrant in Italy.

- Red-eyed vireo Vireo olivaceus Vireo occhirossi – A

== Shrikes ==
Order: Passeriformes Family: Laniidae

Shrikes are passerine birds known for their habit of catching other birds, mice, and large insects, and impaling the uneaten portions on thorns. Shrikes have hooked beaks, like that of a typical bird of prey.

- Brown shrike Lanius cristatus Averla bruna – A
- Red-backed shrike Lanius collurio Averla piccola – A
- Isabelline shrike Lanius isabellinus Averla isabellina – A
- Lesser grey shrike Lanius minor Averla cenerina – A
- Great grey shrike Lanius excubitor Averla maggiore – A
- Iberian grey shrike Lanius meridionalis Averla meridionale – A
- Woodchat shrike Lanius senator Averla capirossa – A
- Masked shrike Lanius nubicus Averla mascherata – A
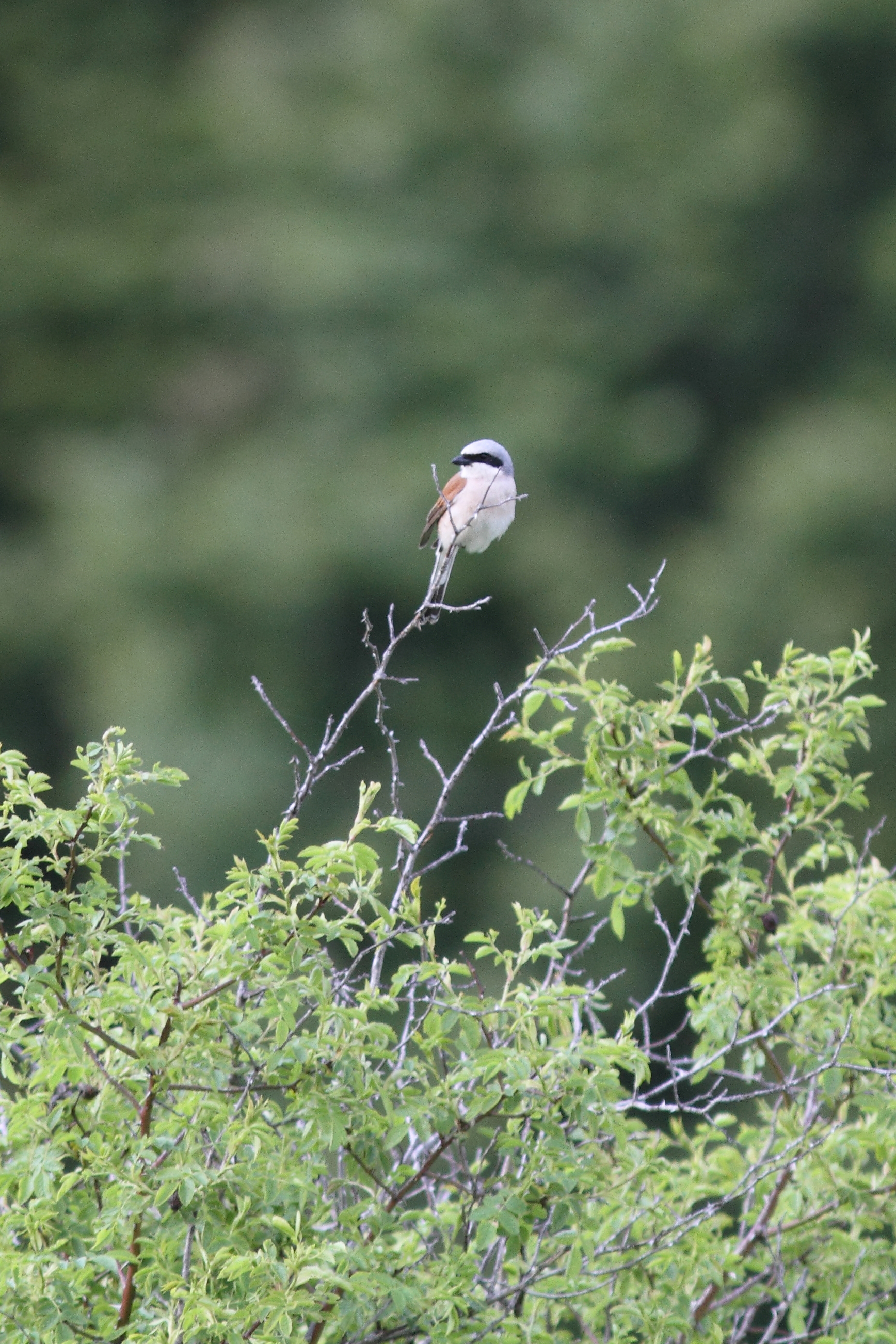
Red-backed shrike, Abruzzo, near Pescasseroli

== Crows, jays, and magpies ==
Order: Passeriformes Family: Corvidae

The family Corvidae includes crows, ravens, jays, choughs, magpies, and nutcrackers. Corvids are above average in size among the Passeriformes, and some of the larger species show high levels of intelligence and exceptional spatial memory.

- Red-billed chough Pyrrhocorax pyrrhocorax Gracchio corallino – A
- Yellow-billed chough Pyrrhocorax graculus Gracchio alpino – A
- Eurasian jay Garrulus glandarius Ghiandaia – A
- Eurasian magpie Pica pica Gazza – A
- Northern nutcracker Nucifraga caryocatactes Nocciolaia – A
- Eurasian jackdaw Coloeus monedula Taccola – A
- Rook Corvus frugilegus Corvo comune – A
- Common raven Corvus corax Corvo imperiale – A
- Brown-necked raven Corvus ruficollis Corvo collobruno – A
- Carrion crow Corvus corone Cornacchia – A
  - (including hooded crow as Corvus corone cornix)
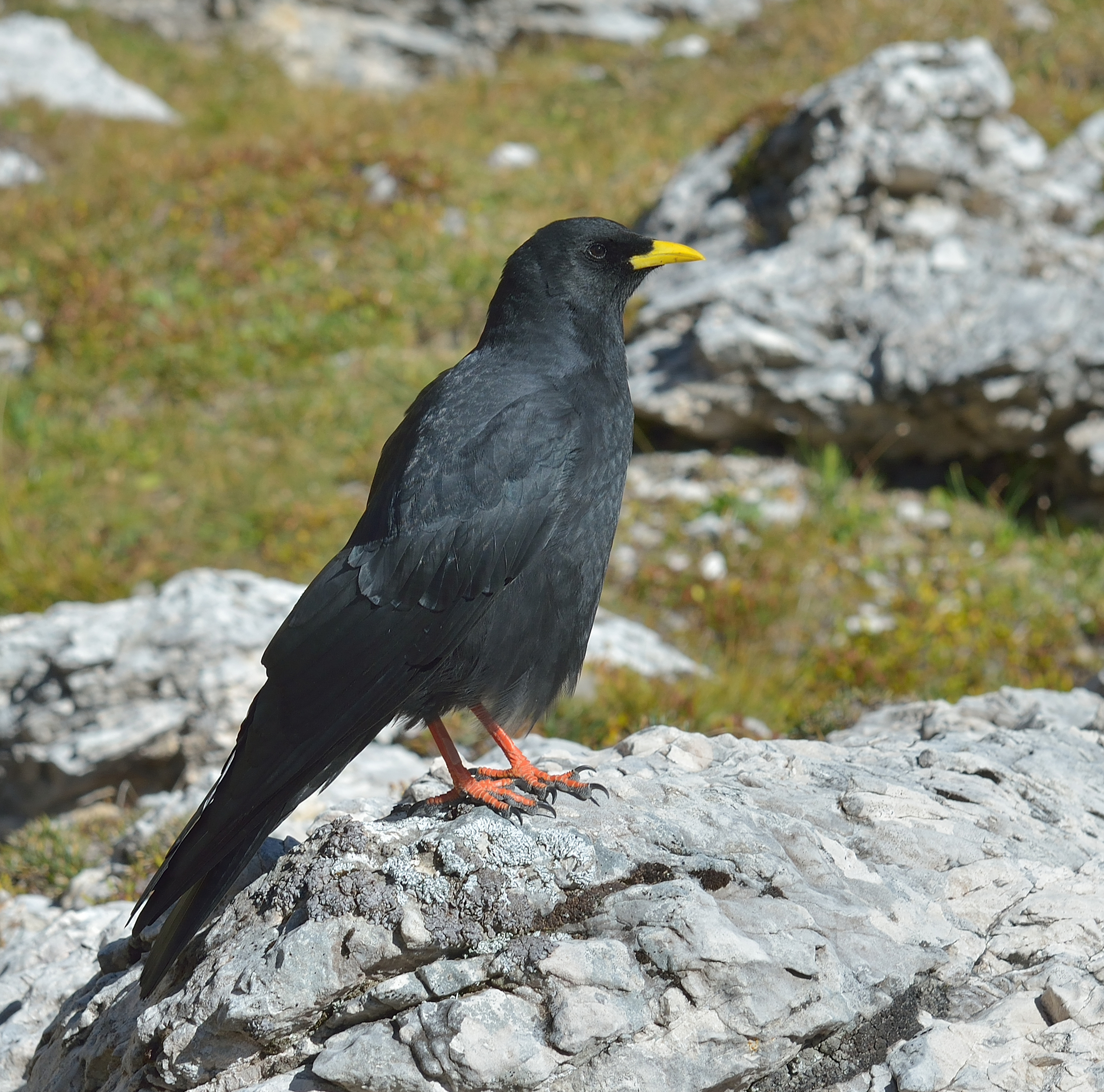
Yellow-billed chough, Val Gardena

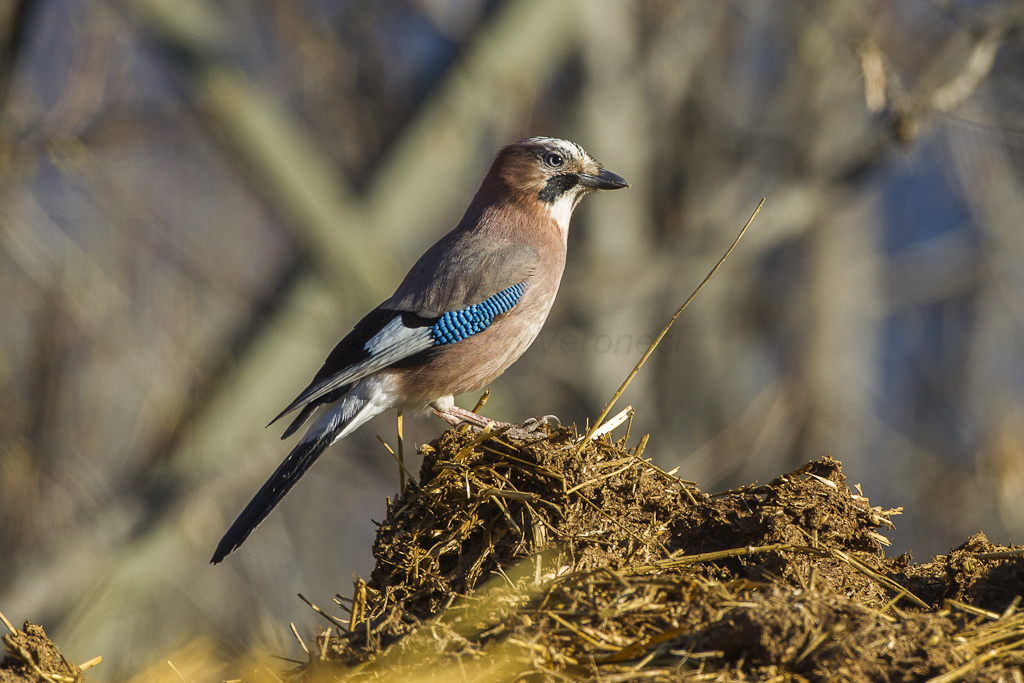
Eurasian jay, Aosta Valley

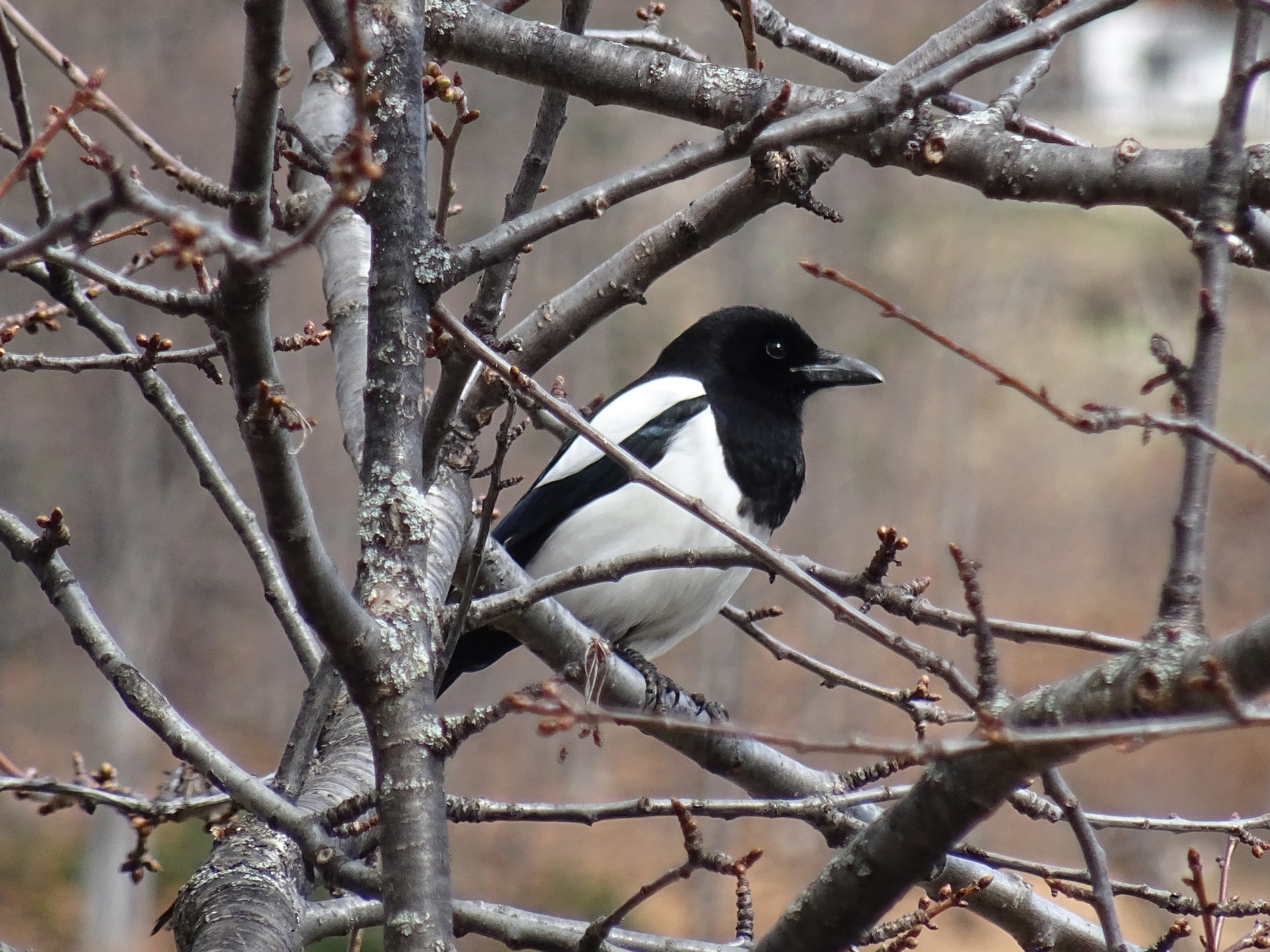
Eurasian magpie, South Tyrol

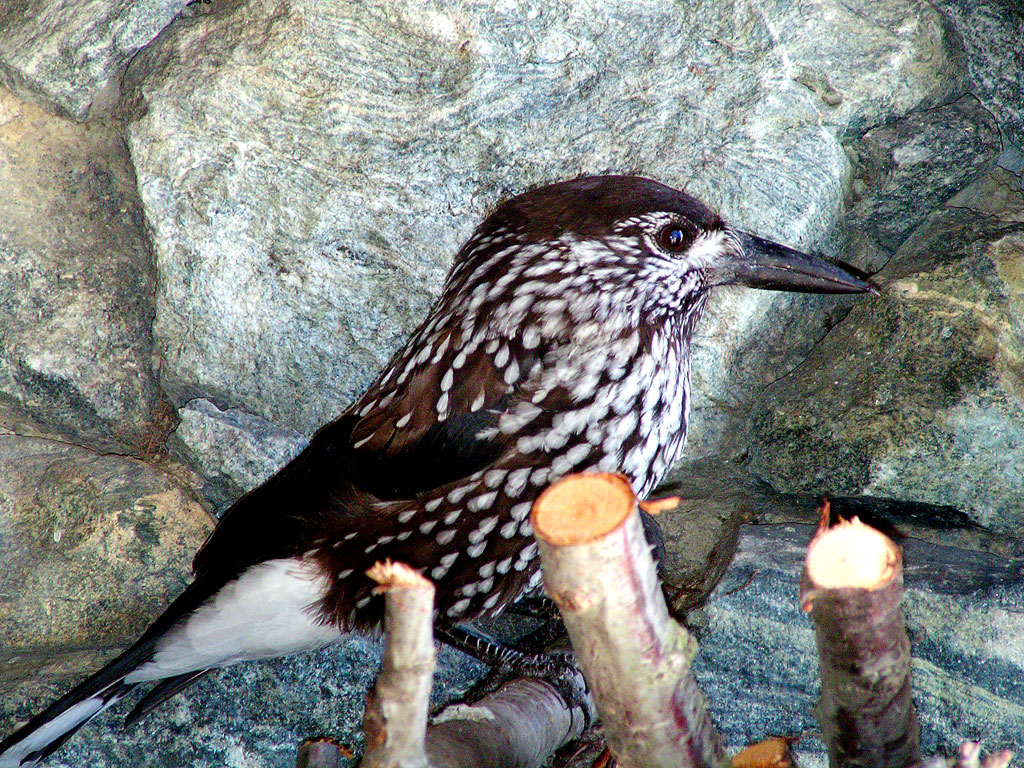
Northern nutcracker, Aosta Valley

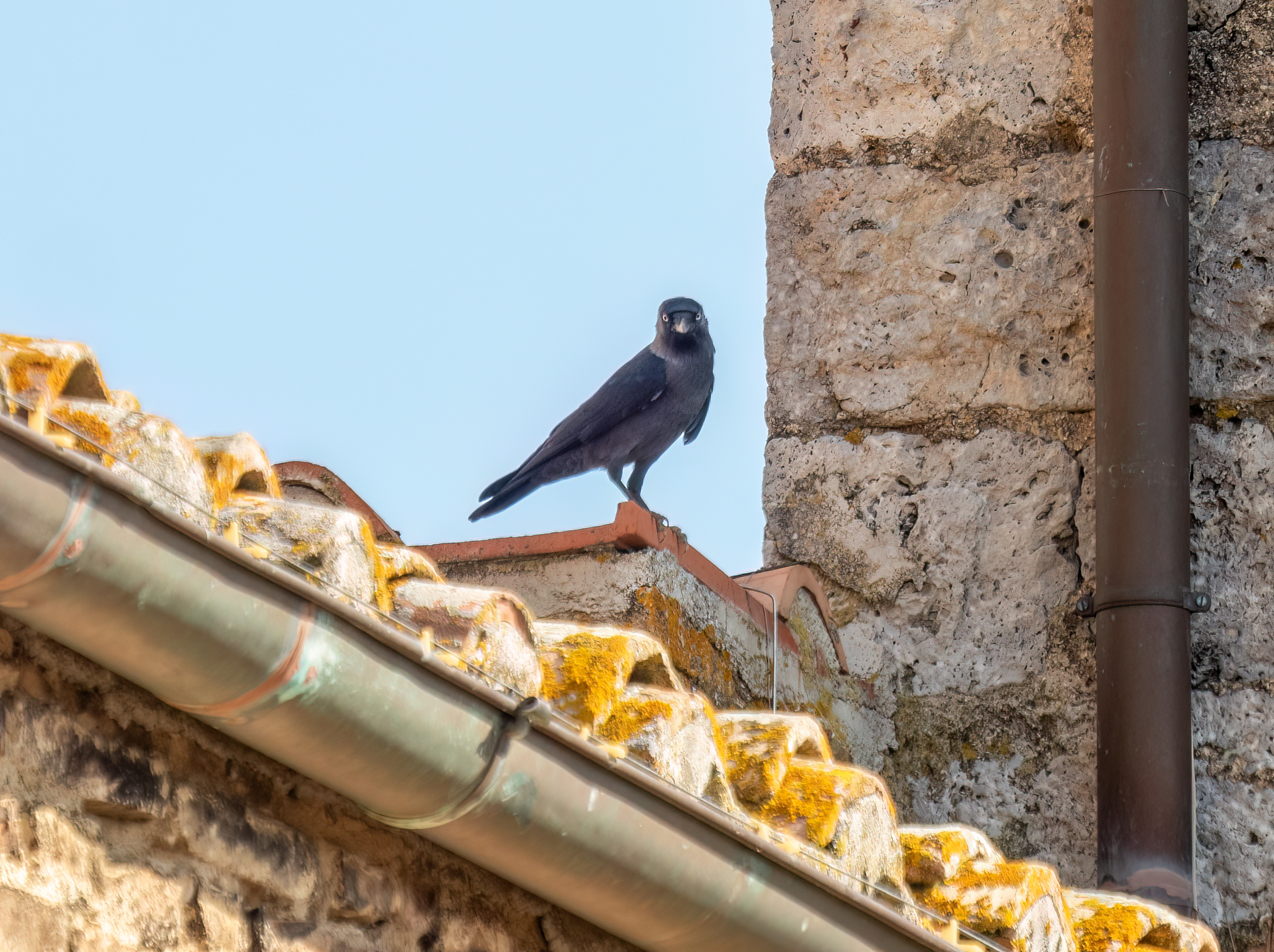
Eurasian jackdaw, San Gimignano

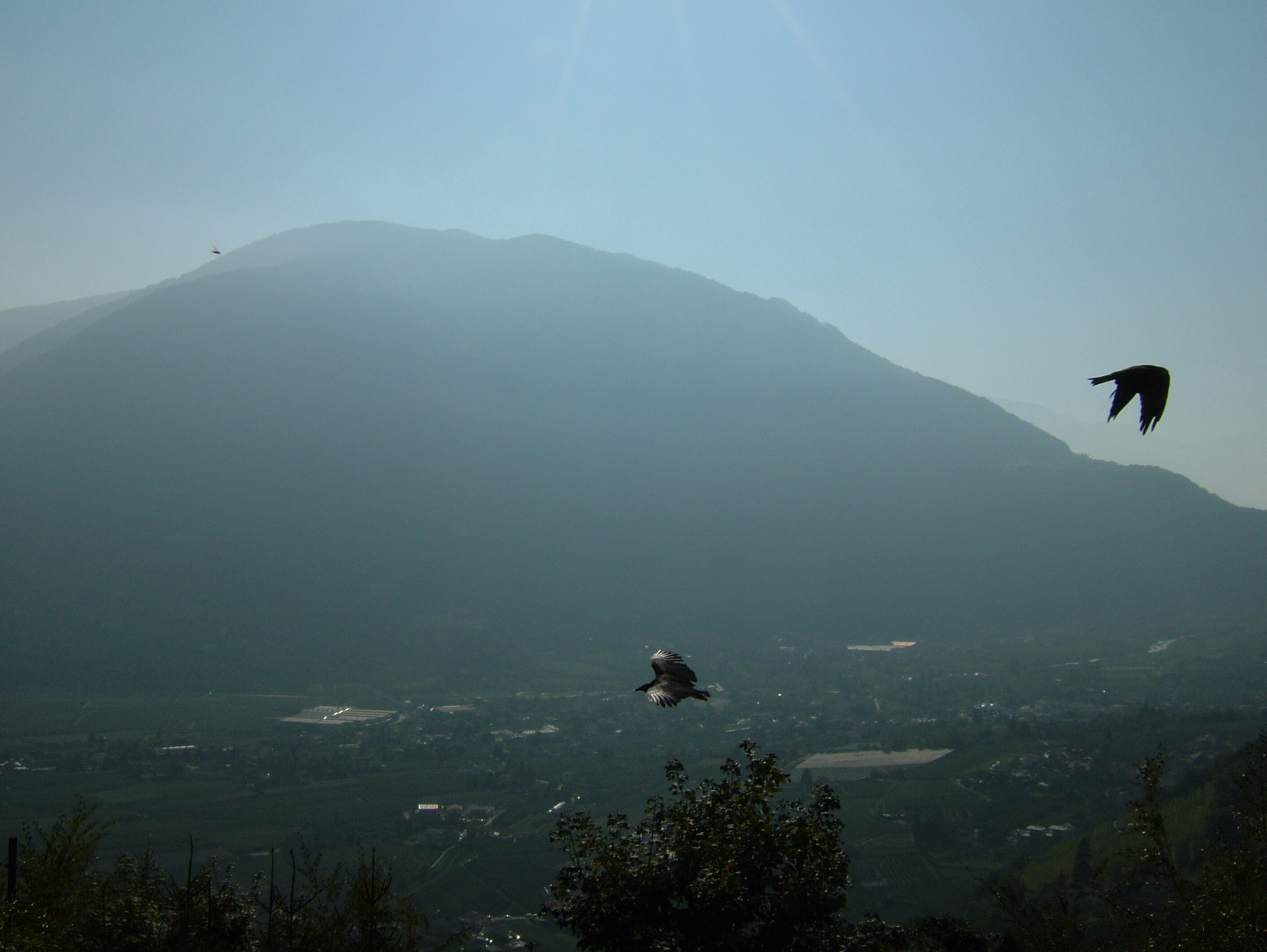
Common raven (left) with unknown acciptrid (right), Tyrol Castle

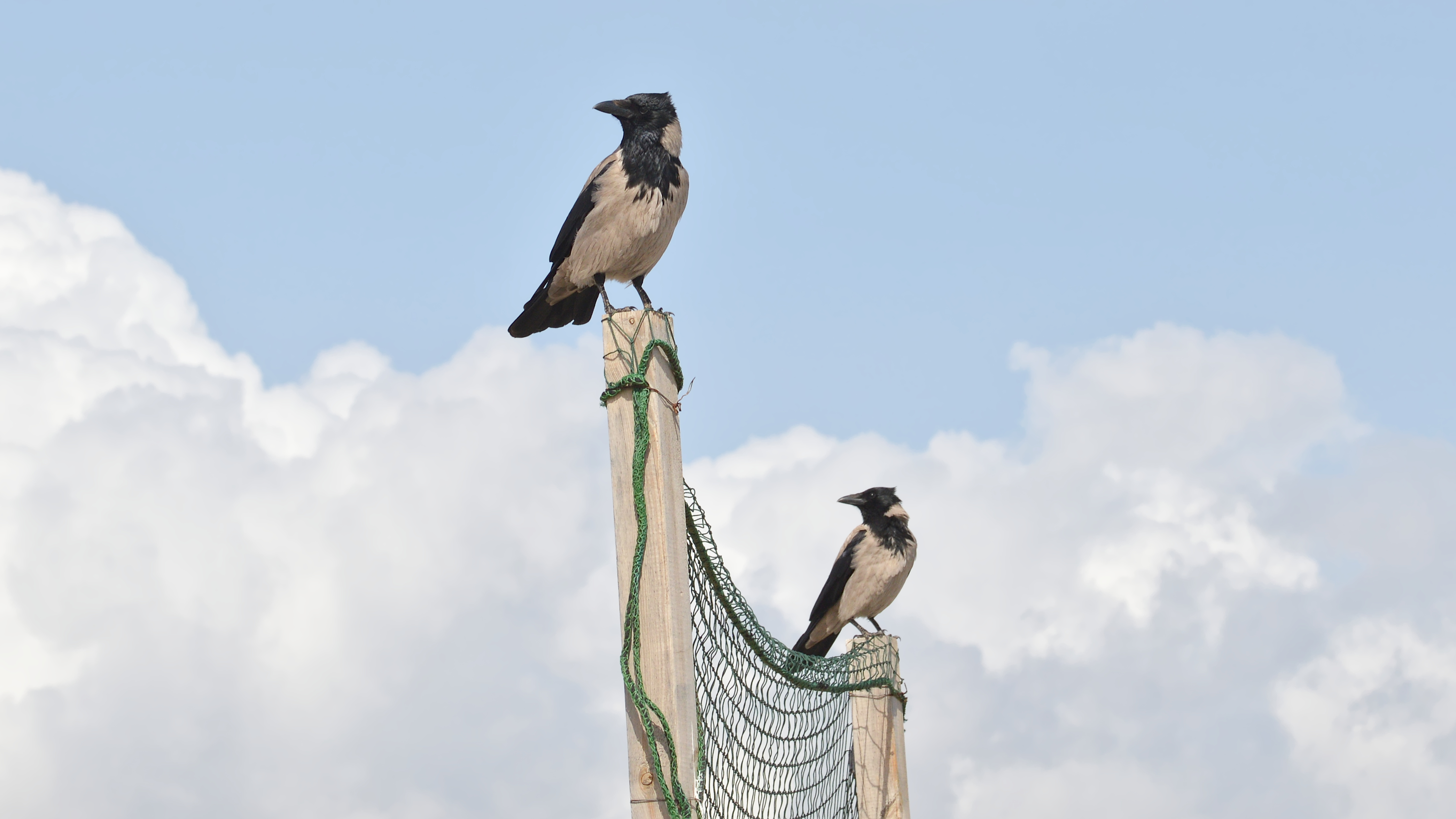
Hooded crows, Cagliari, Sardinia

== Tits ==
Order: Passeriformes Family: Paridae

The Paridae are mainly small stocky woodland species with short stout bills. Some have crests. They are adaptable birds, with a mixed diet including seeds and insects.

- Coal tit Periparus ater Cincia mora – A
- Crested tit Lophophanes cristatus Cincia dal ciuffo – A
- Sombre tit Poecile lugubris Cincia dalmatina – B
- Marsh tit Poecile palustris Cincia bigia – A
- Willow tit Poecile montanus Cincia alpestre – A
- Eurasian blue tit Cyanistes caeruleus Cinciarella – A
- African blue tit Cyanistes teneriffae Cinciarella algerina – A
- Great tit Parus major Cinciallegra – A
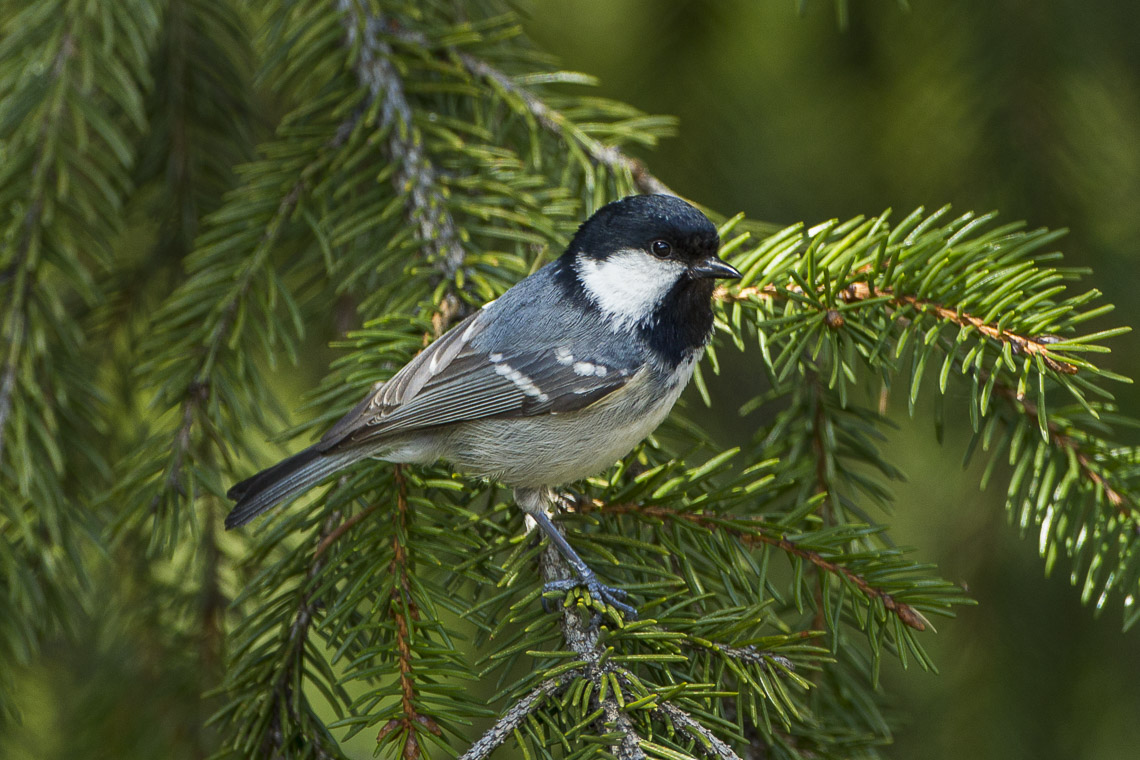
Coal tit, Aosta Valley

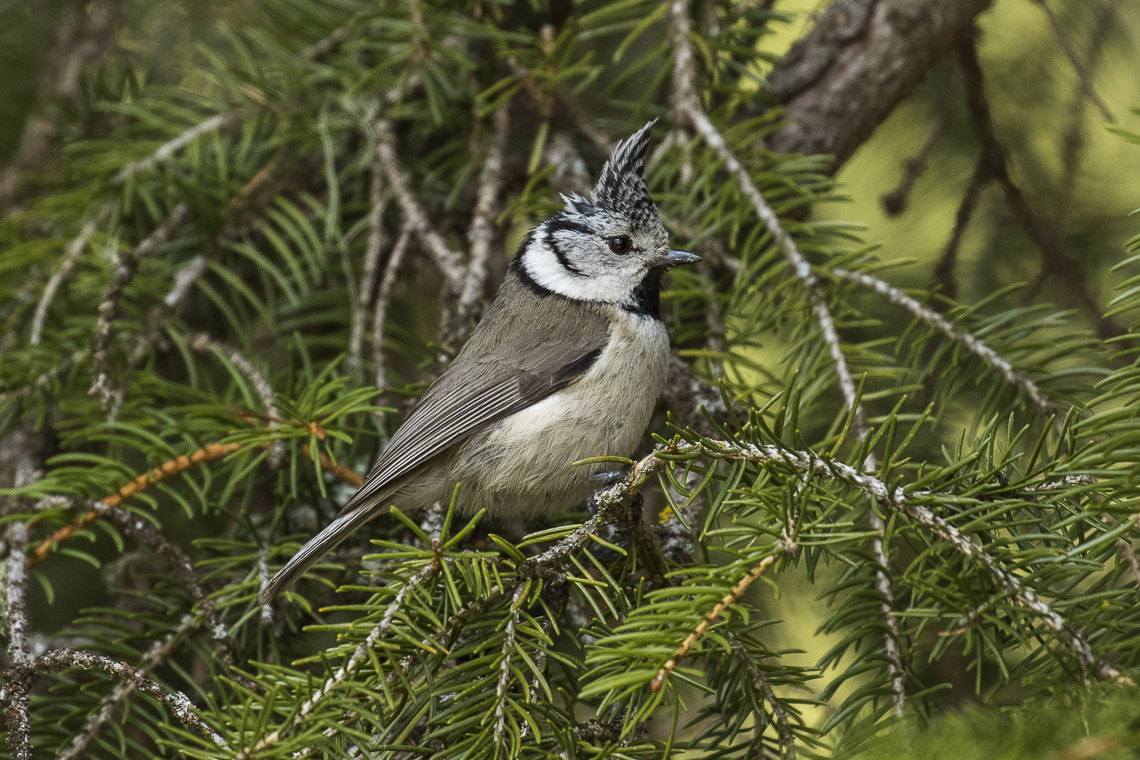
Crested tit, Aosta Valley

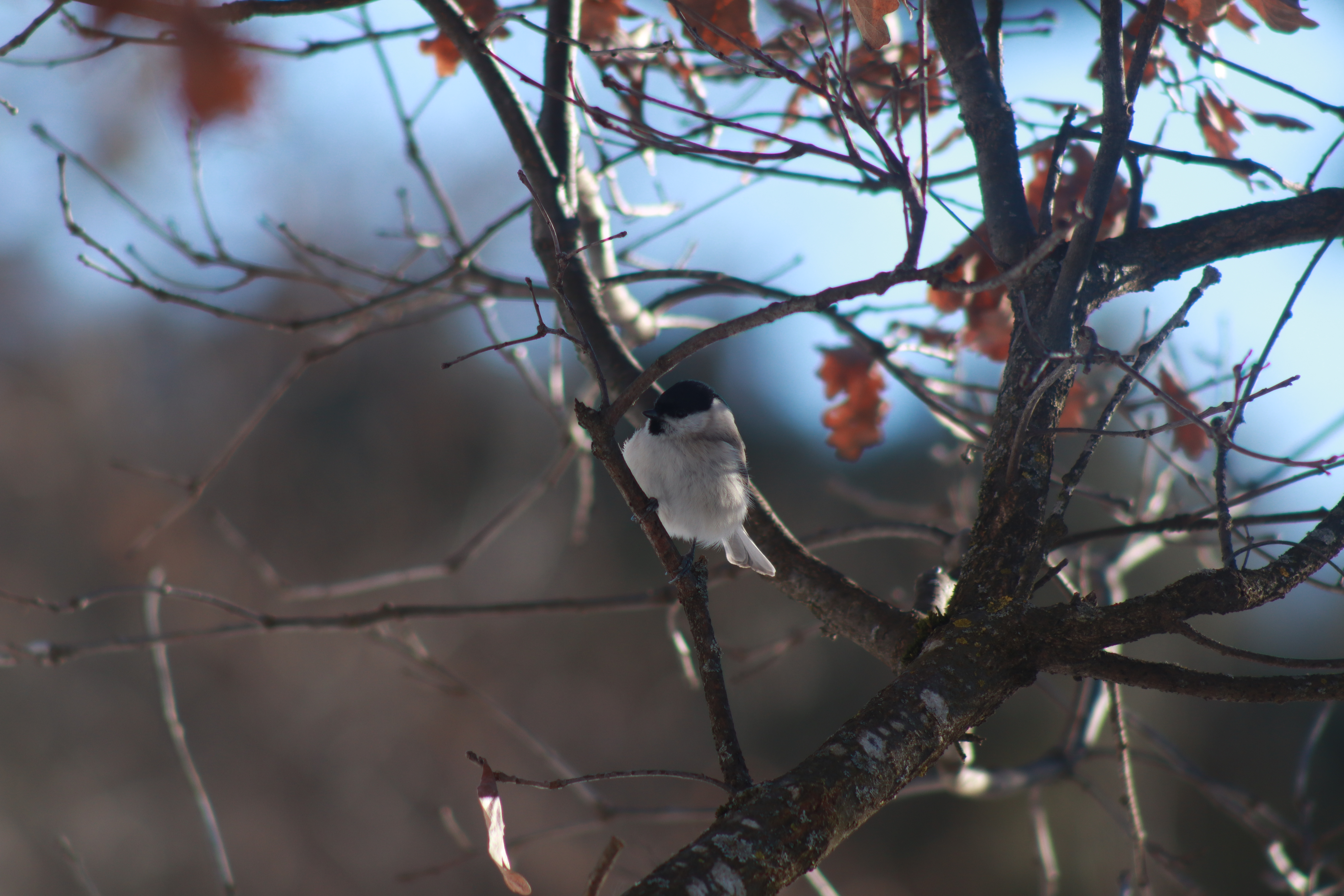
Marsh tit, presumably in Italy

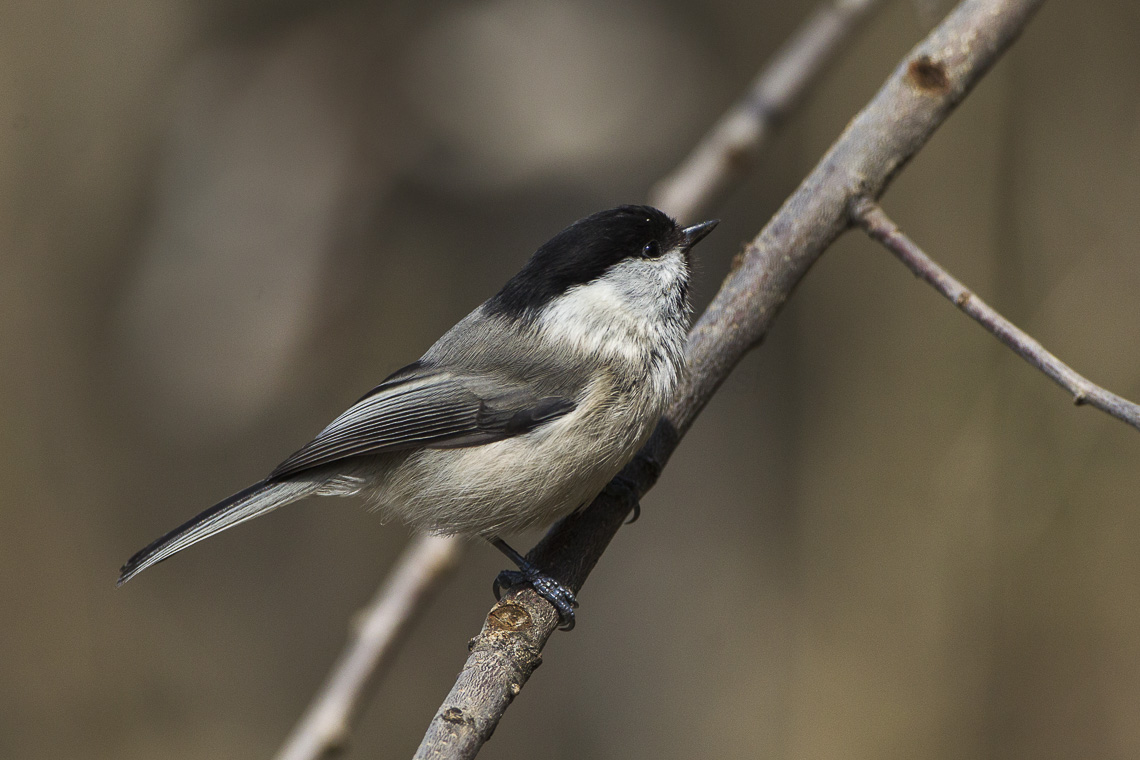
Willow tit, Aosta Valley

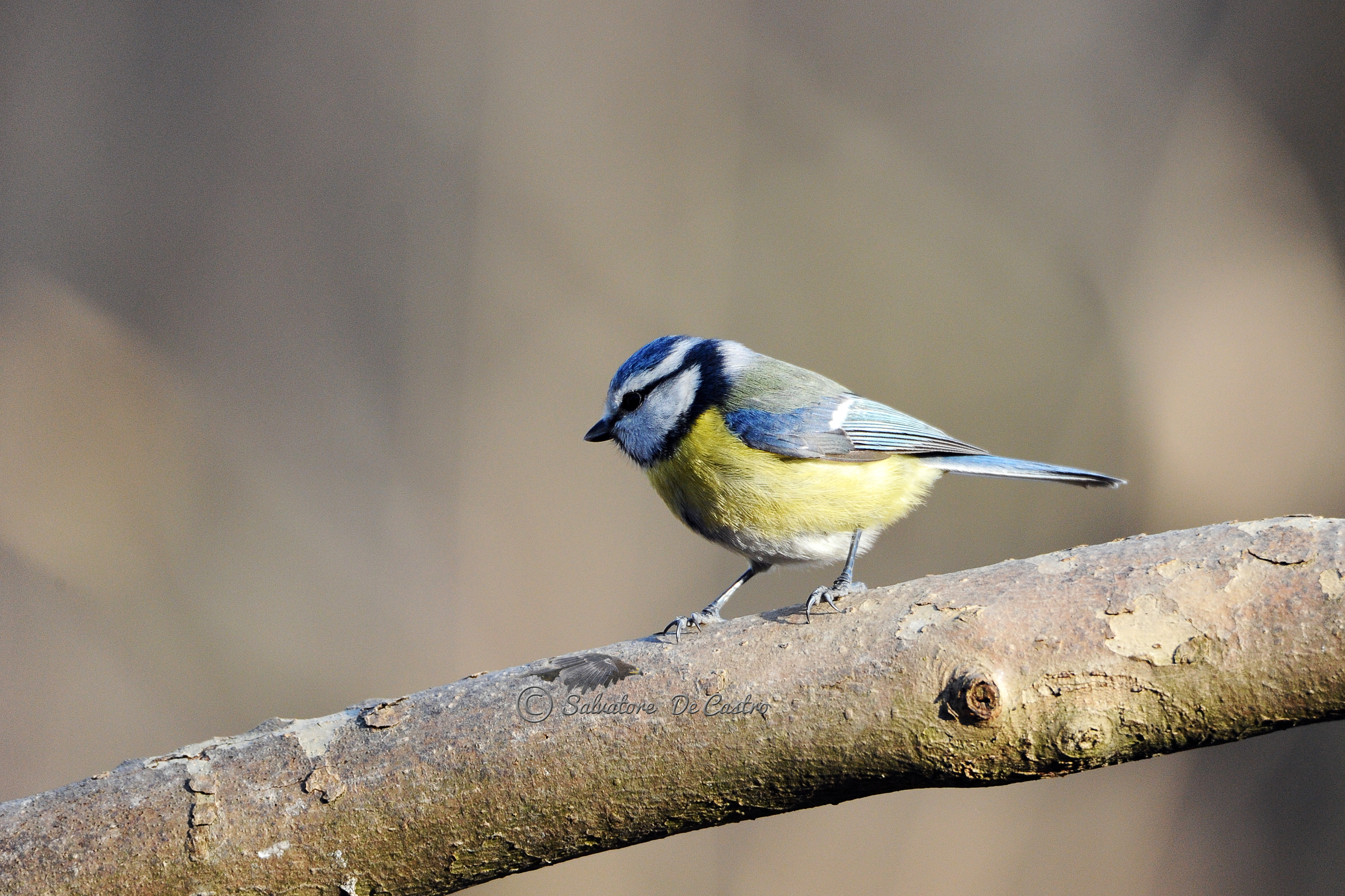
Eurasian blue tit, Palude Brabbia Nature Reserve, Inarzo, Lombardy

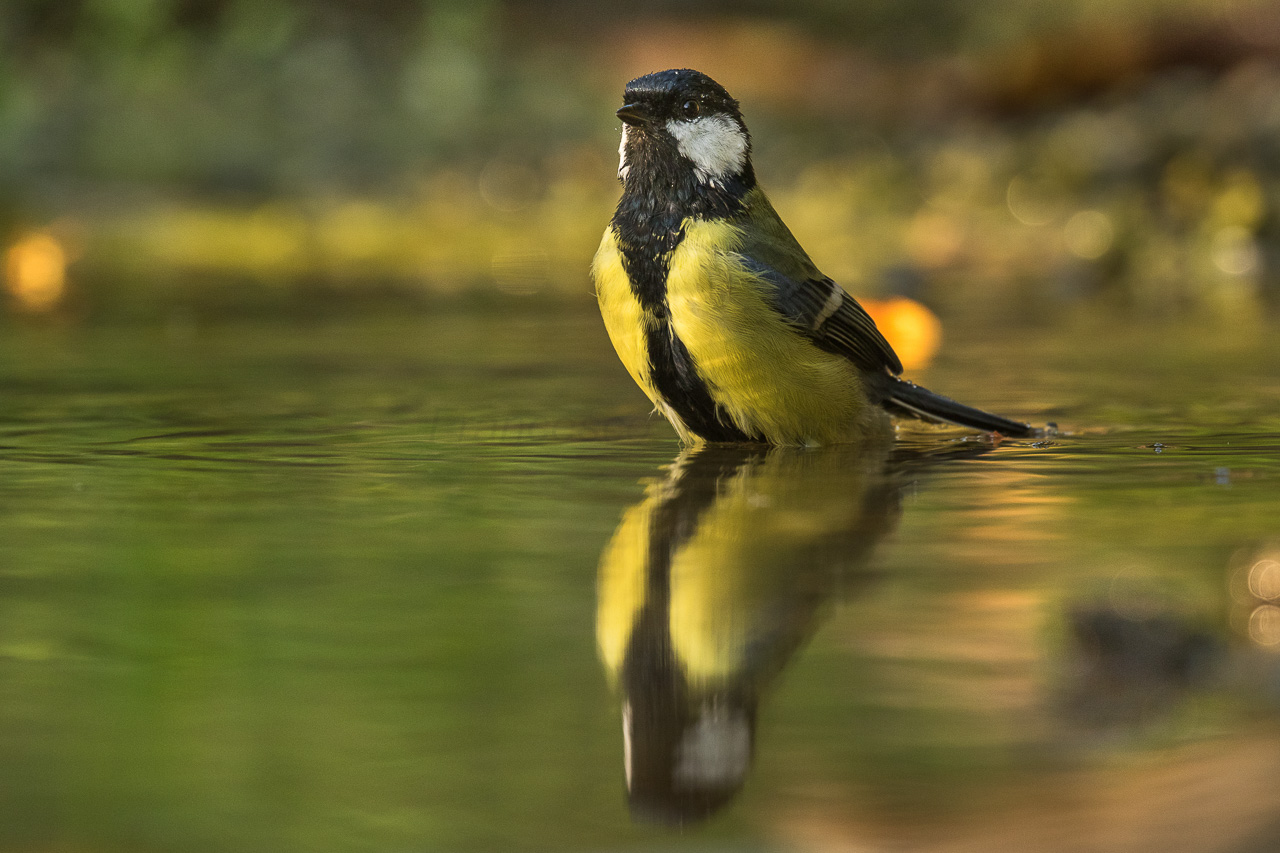
Great tit, Castelletto Merli, Piedmont

== Penduline tits ==
Order: Passeriformes Family: Remizidae

The penduline tits are a group of small passerine birds related to the true tits. They are insectivores.

- Eurasian penduline tit Remiz pendulinus Pendolino – A

== Larks ==
Order: Passeriformes Family: Alaudidae

Larks are small terrestrial birds with often extravagant songs and display flights. Most larks are fairly dull in appearance. Their food is insects and seeds.

- Greater hoopoe-lark Alaemon alaudipes Allodola beccocurvo – A
- Bar-tailed lark Ammomanes cinctura Allodola del deserto minore – A
- Dupont's lark Chersophilus duponti Allodola di Dupont – A
- Lesser short-toed lark Alaudala rufescens Calandrina – A
- Bimaculated lark Melanocorypha bimaculata Calandra asiatica – A
- Calandra lark Melanocorypha calandra Calandra – A
- Black lark Melanocorypha yeltoniensis Calandra nera – A
- Greater short-toed lark Calandrella brachydactyla Calandrella – A
- Horned lark Eremophila alpestris Allodola golagialla – A
- Wood lark Lullula arborea Tottavilla – A
- White-winged lark Alauda leucoptera Calandra siberiana – A
- Eurasian skylark Alauda arvensis Allodola – A
- Crested lark Galerida cristata Cappellaccia – A
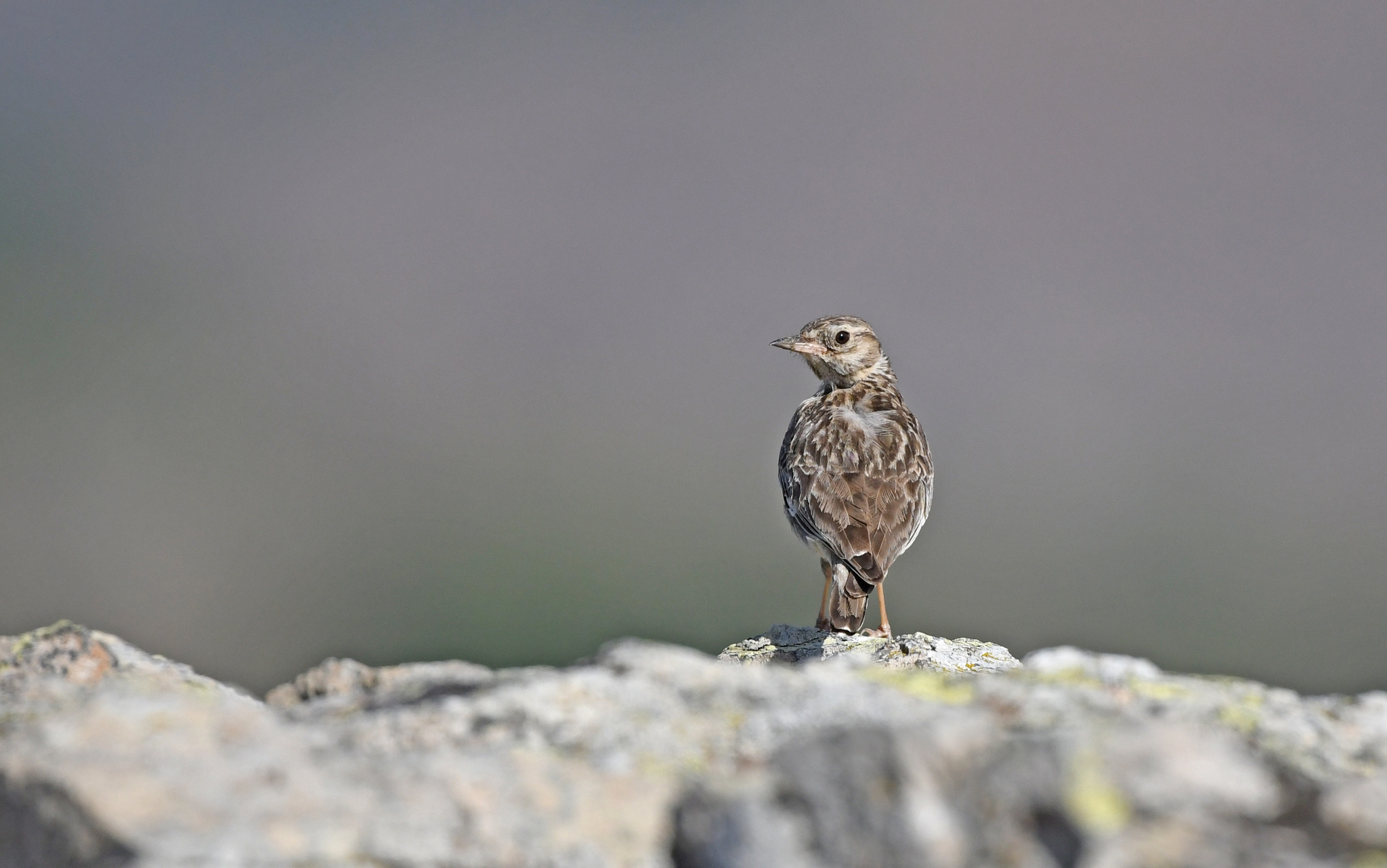
Wood lark, Sardinia

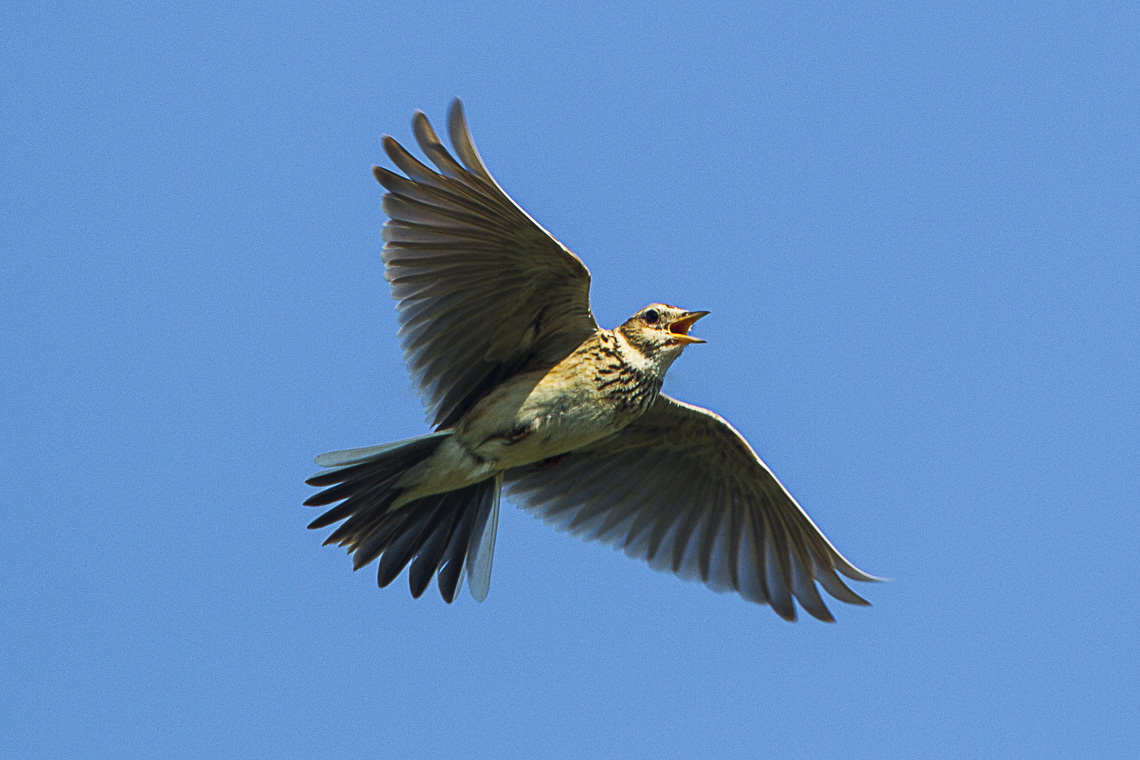
Eurasian skylark, Karst Plateau

== Bearded reedling ==
Order: Passeriformes Family: Panuridae

This species, the only one in its family, is found in reed beds throughout temperate Europe and Asia.

- Bearded reedling Panurus biarmicus Basettino – A

== Cisticolas and allies ==
Order: Passeriformes Family: Cisticolidae

The Cisticolidae are warblers found mainly in warmer southern regions of the Old World. They are generally very small birds of drab brown or grey appearance found in open country such as grassland or scrub.

- Zitting cisticola Cisticola juncidis Beccamoschino – A
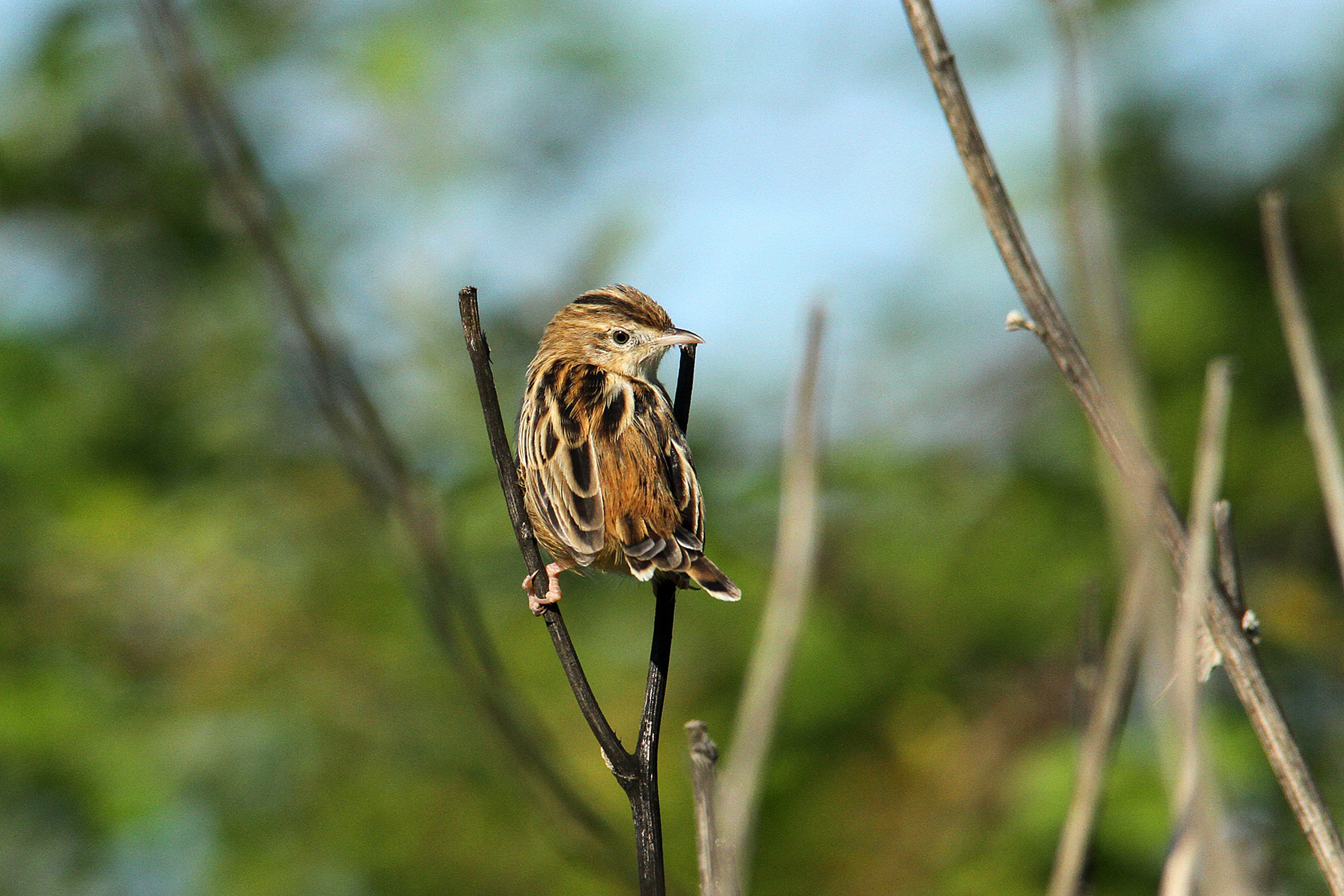
Zitting cisticola, Appian Way Regional Park, Rome

== Reed and tree warblers ==
Order: Passeriformes Family: Acrocephalidae

The members of this family are medium-sized to large for "warblers". Most are rather plain olivaceous brown above and buffy to yellowish below. They are usually found in open woodland, reedbeds, or tall grass. The family occurs mostly in Eurasia, but it also ranges far into the Pacific, and several species in Africa.

- Booted warbler Iduna caligata Canapino asiatico – A
- Eastern olivaceous warbler Iduna pallida Canapino pallido orientale – A
- Western olivaceous warbler Iduna opaca Canapino pallido occidentale – A
- Olive-tree warbler Hippolais olivetorum Canapino levantino – A
- Melodious warbler Hippolais polyglotta Canapino comune – A
- Icterine warbler Hippolais icterina Canapino maggiore – A
- Aquatic warbler Acrocephalus paludicola Pagliarolo – A
- Moustached warbler Acrocephalus melanopogon Forapaglie castagnolo – A
- Sedge warbler Acrocephalus schoenobaenus Forapaglie comune – A
- Blyth's reed warbler Acrocephalus dumetorum Cannaiola di Blyth – A
- Marsh warbler Acrocephalus palustris Cannaiola verdognola – A
- Eurasian reed warbler Acrocephalus scirpaceus Cannaiola comune – A
- Paddyfield warbler Acrocephalus agricola Cannaiola di Jerdon – A
- Great reed warbler Acrocephalus arundinaceus Cannareccione – A
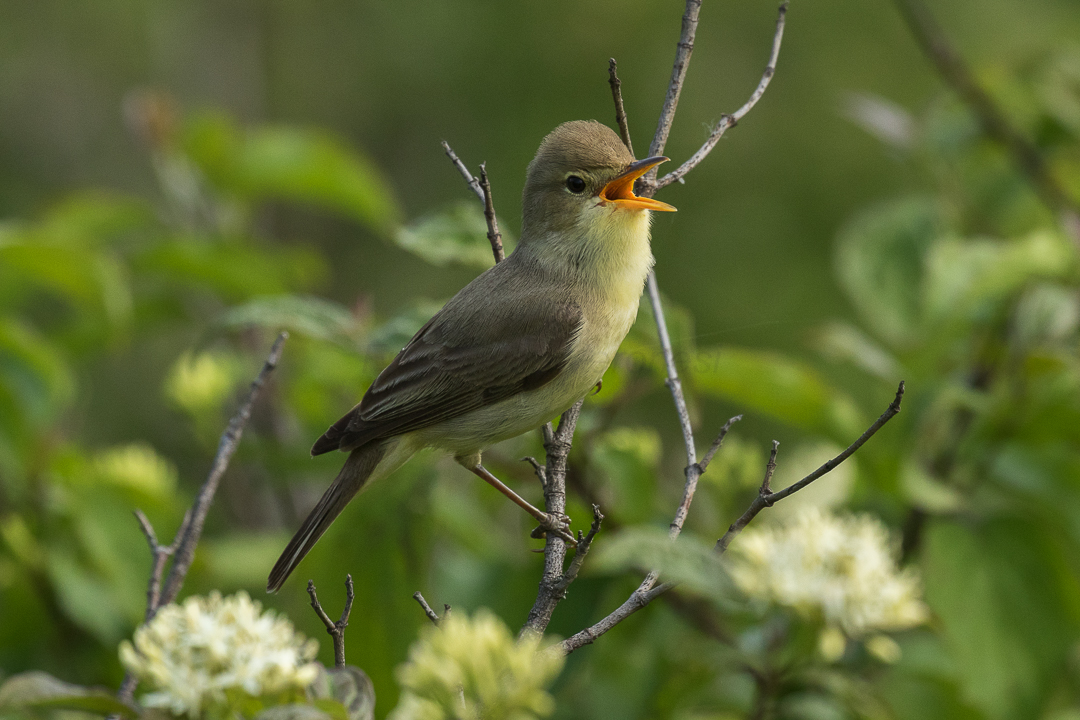
Melodious warbler, Pavia, Lombardy

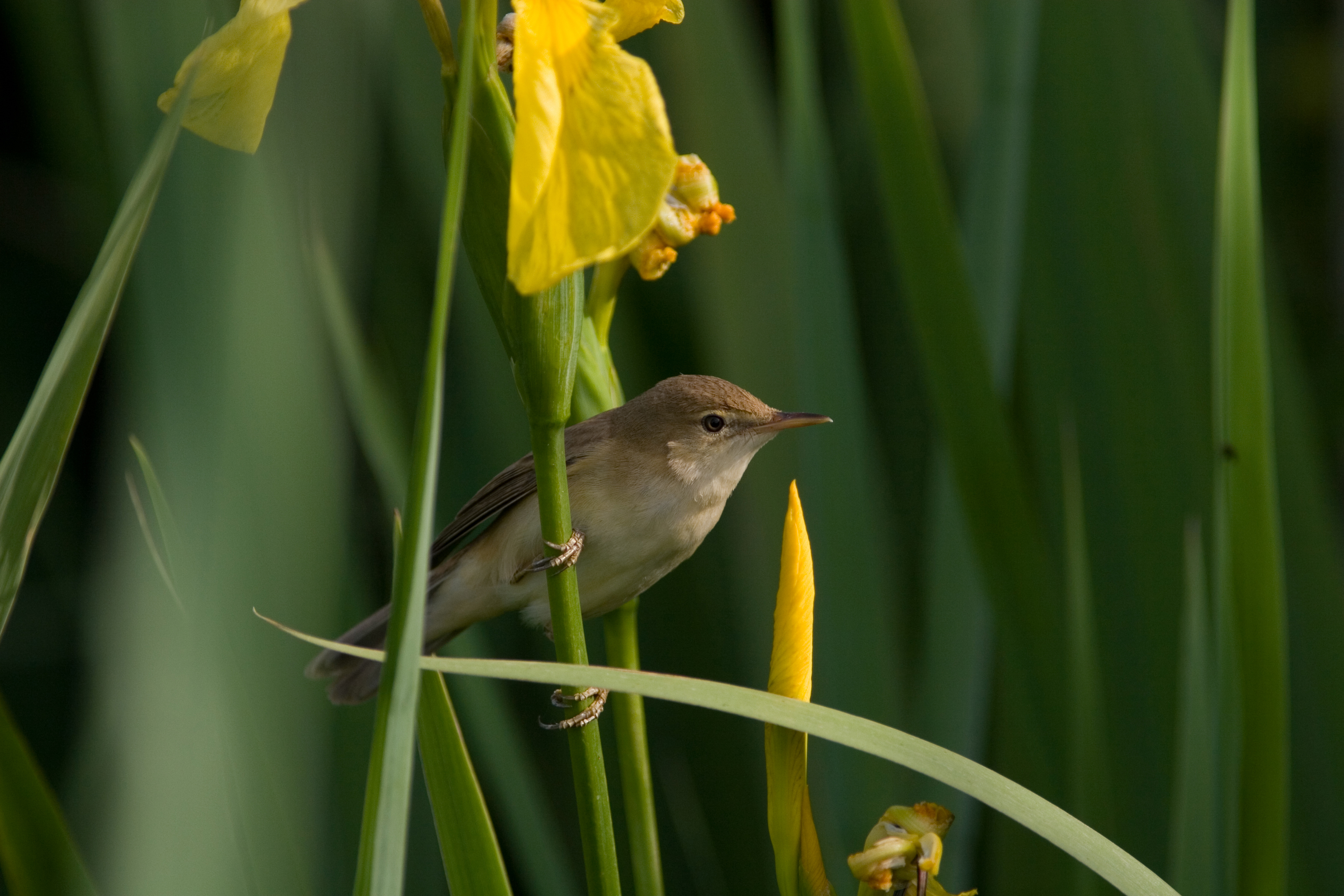
Eurasian reed warbler, Litorale Romano State Nature Reserve, Lazio

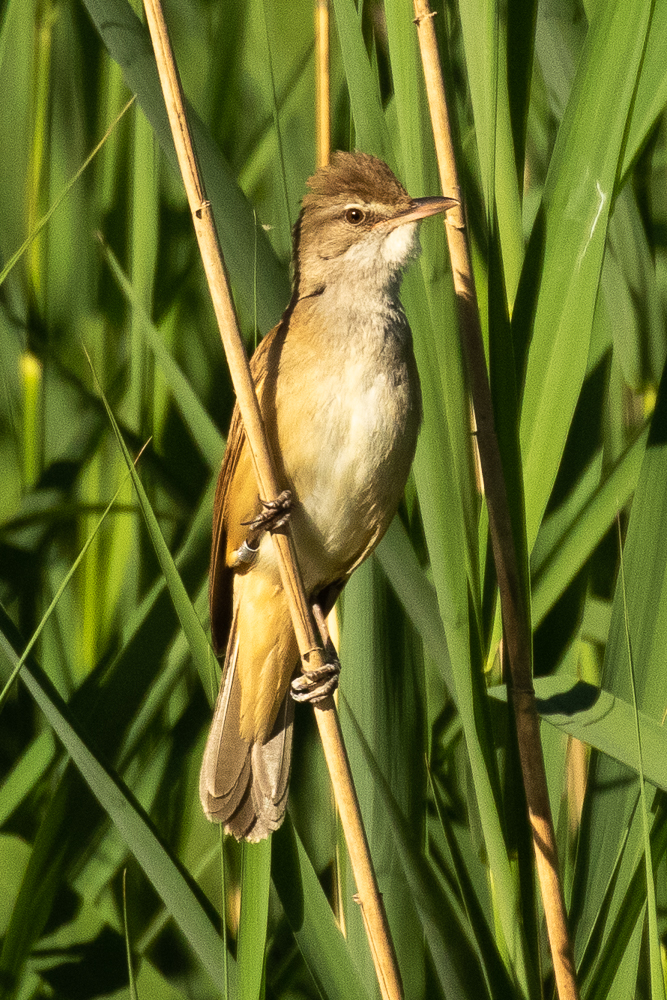
Great reed warbler, Vercelli, Piedmont

== Grassbirds and allies ==
Order: Passeriformes Family: Locustellidae

Locustellidae are a family of small insectivorous songbirds found mainly in Eurasia, Africa, and the Australian region. They are smallish birds with tails that are usually long and pointed, and tend to be drab brownish or buffy all over.

- Savi's warbler Locustella luscinioides Salciaiola – A
- River warbler Locustella fluviatilis Locustella fluviatile – A
- Common grasshopper warbler Locustella naevia Forapaglie macchiettato – A

== Swallows ==
Order: Passeriformes Family: Hirundinidae

The family Hirundinidae is adapted to aerial feeding. They have a slender streamlined body, long pointed wings and a short bill with a wide gape. The feet are adapted to perching rather than walking, and the front toes are partially joined at the base.

- Western house martin Delichon urbicum Balestruccio – A
- European red-rumped swallow Cecropis rufula Rondine rossiccia – A
- Barn swallow Hirundo rustica Rondine – A
- Eurasian crag martin Ptyonoprogne rupestris Rondine montana – A
- Sand martin Riparia riparia Topino – A
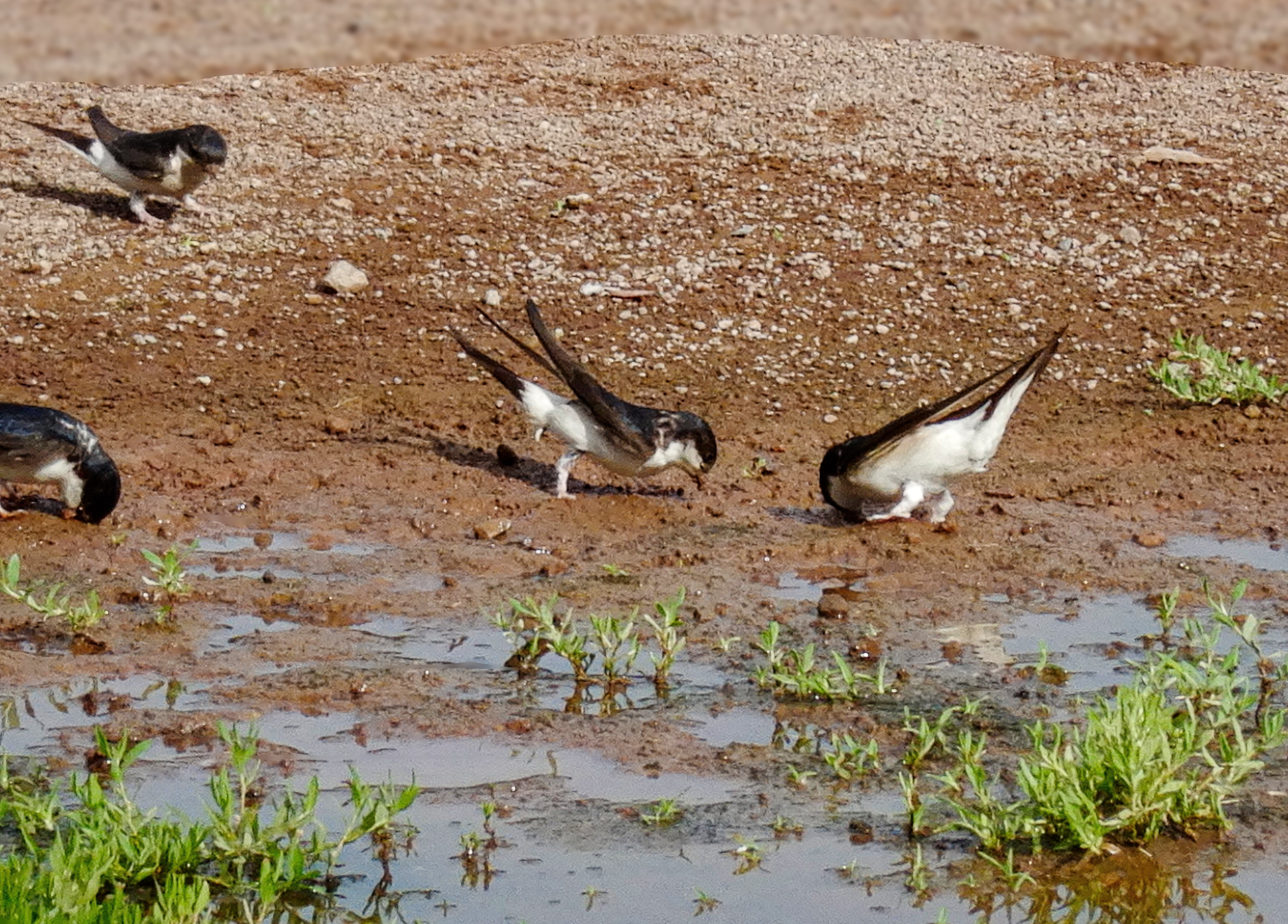
Western house martins, Trevignano Romano, Lazio

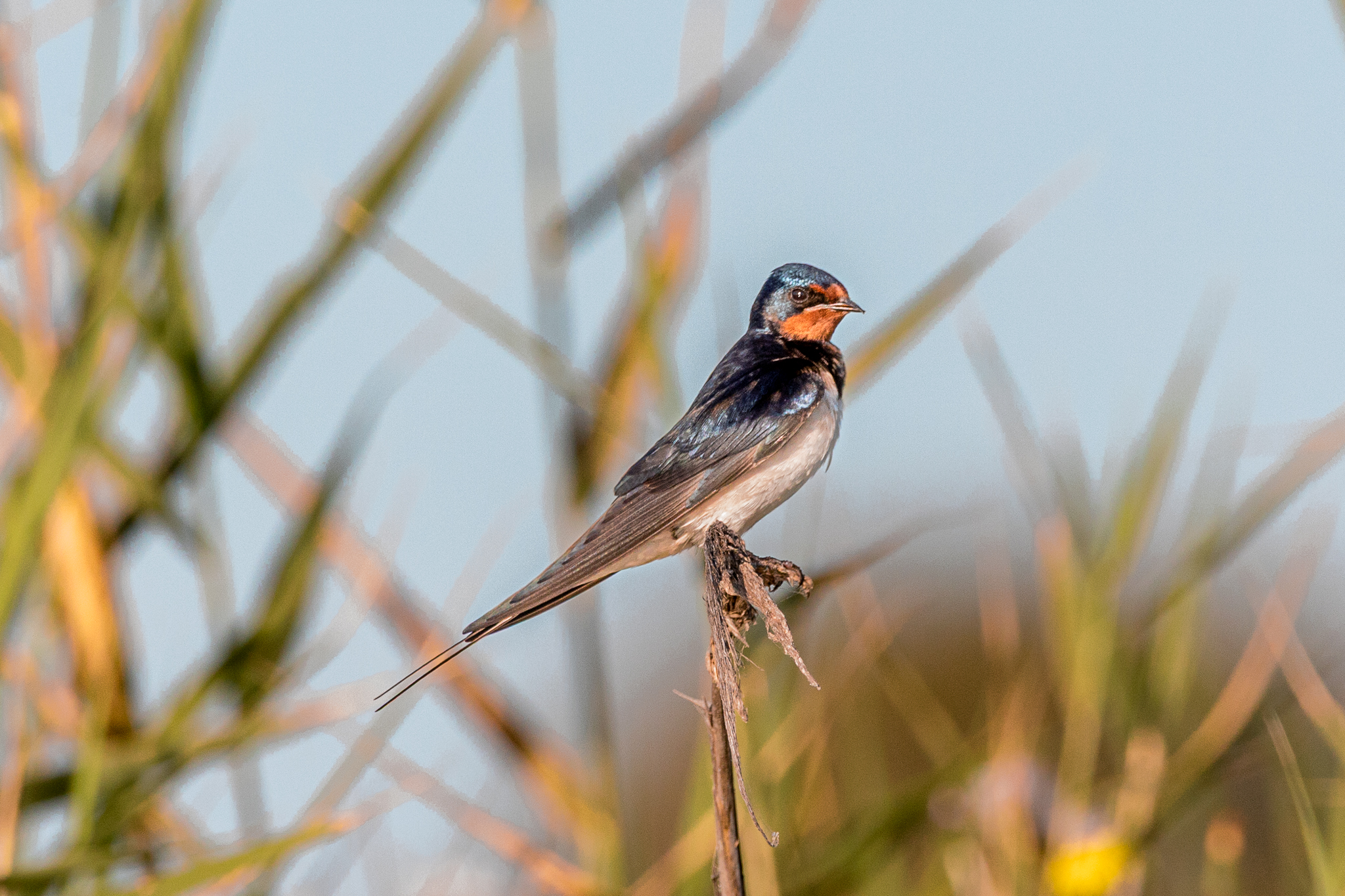
Barn swallow, Saline di Augusta, Sicily

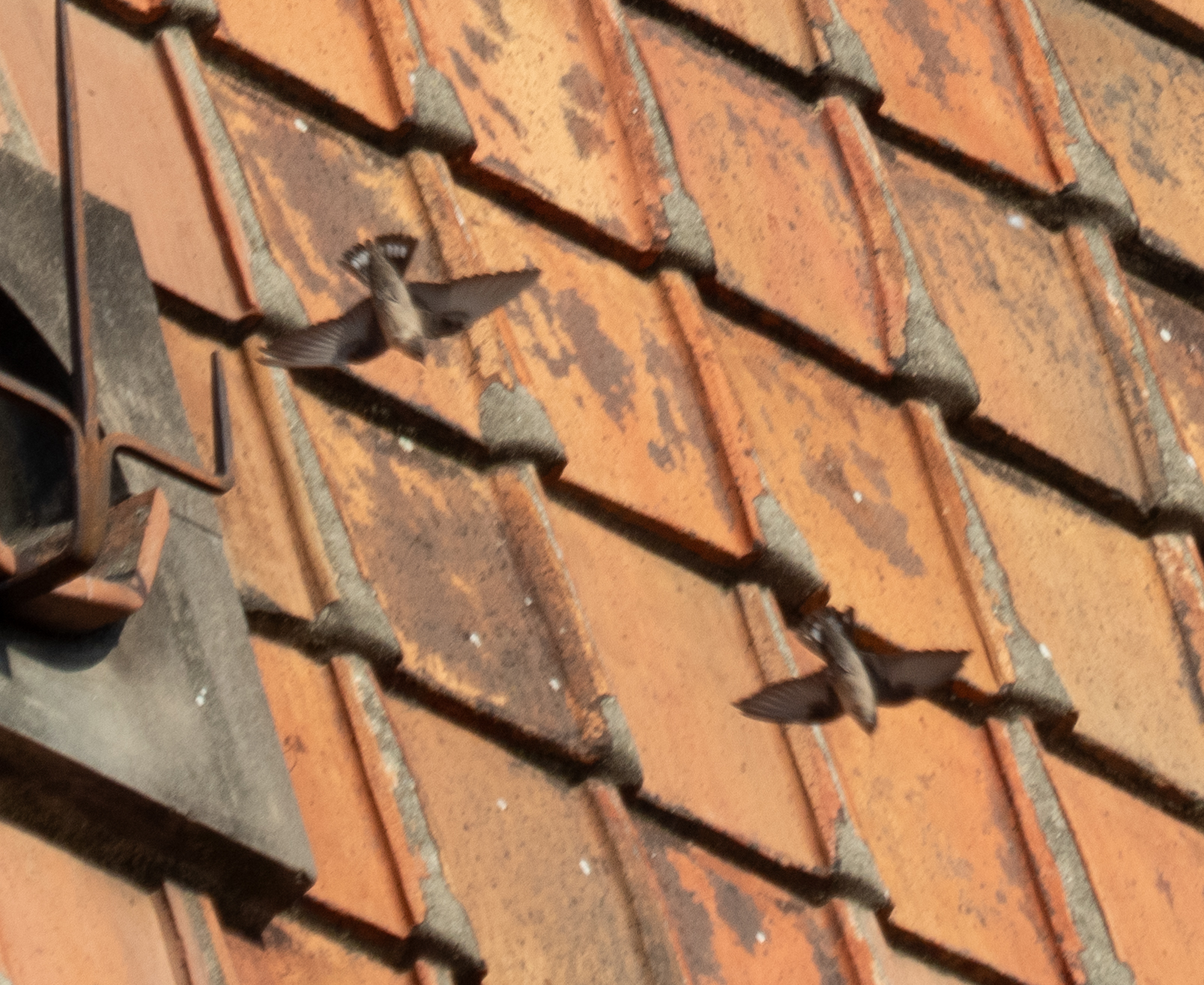
Eurasian crag martin, Florence Cathedral

== Leaf warblers ==
Order: Passeriformes Family: Phylloscopidae

Leaf warblers are a family of small insectivorous birds found mostly in Eurasia and ranging into Wallacea and Africa. The species are small to very small, often green-plumaged above and yellow or white below, or more subdued greyish-green to greyish-brown.

- Eastern Bonelli's warbler Phylloscopus orientalis Luì bianco orientale – A
- Western Bonelli's warbler Phylloscopus bonelli Luì bianco – A
- Wood warbler Phylloscopus sibilatrix Luì verde – A
- Yellow-browed warbler Phylloscopus inornatus Luì forestiero – A
- Hume's warbler Phylloscopus humei Luì di Hume – A
- Pallas's leaf warbler Phylloscopus proregulus Luì di Pallas – A
- Dusky warbler Phylloscopus fuscatus Luì scuro – A
- Willow warbler Phylloscopus trochilus Luì grosso – A
- Iberian chiffchaff Phylloscopus ibericus Luì iberico – A
- Common chiffchaff Phylloscopus collybita Luì piccolo – A
- Siberian chiffchaff Phylloscopus tristis Luì siberiano – A
- Radde's warbler Phylloscopus schwarzi Luì di Radde – A
- Greenish warbler Phylloscopus trochiloides Luì verdastro – A
- Arctic warbler Phylloscopus borealis Luì boreale – A
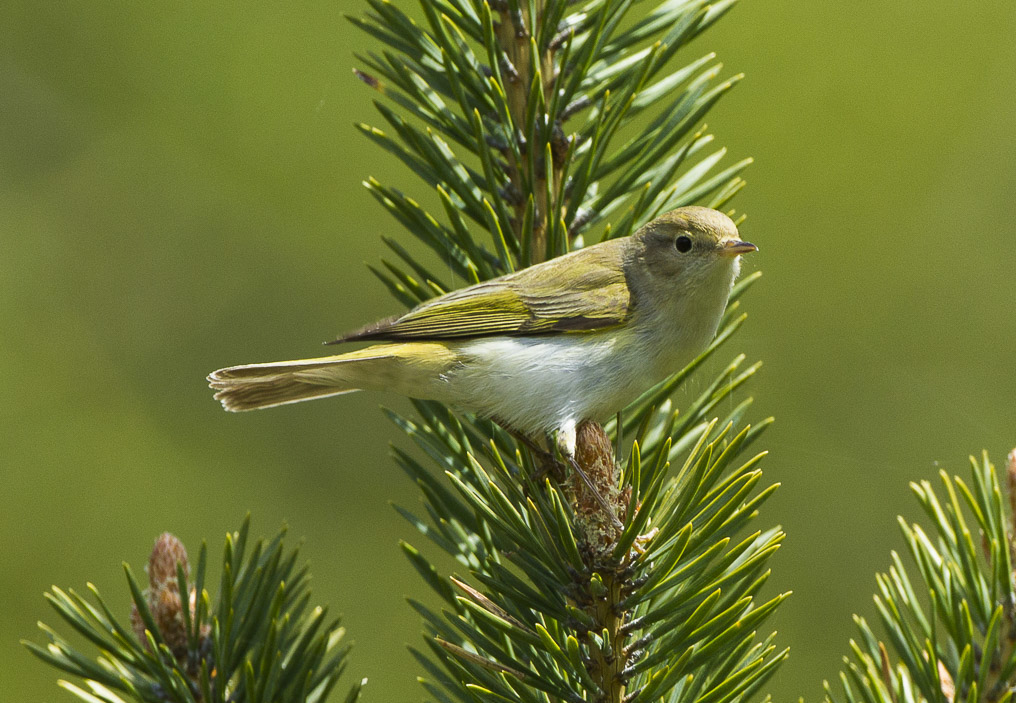
Western Bonelli's warbler, Gran Paradiso National Park

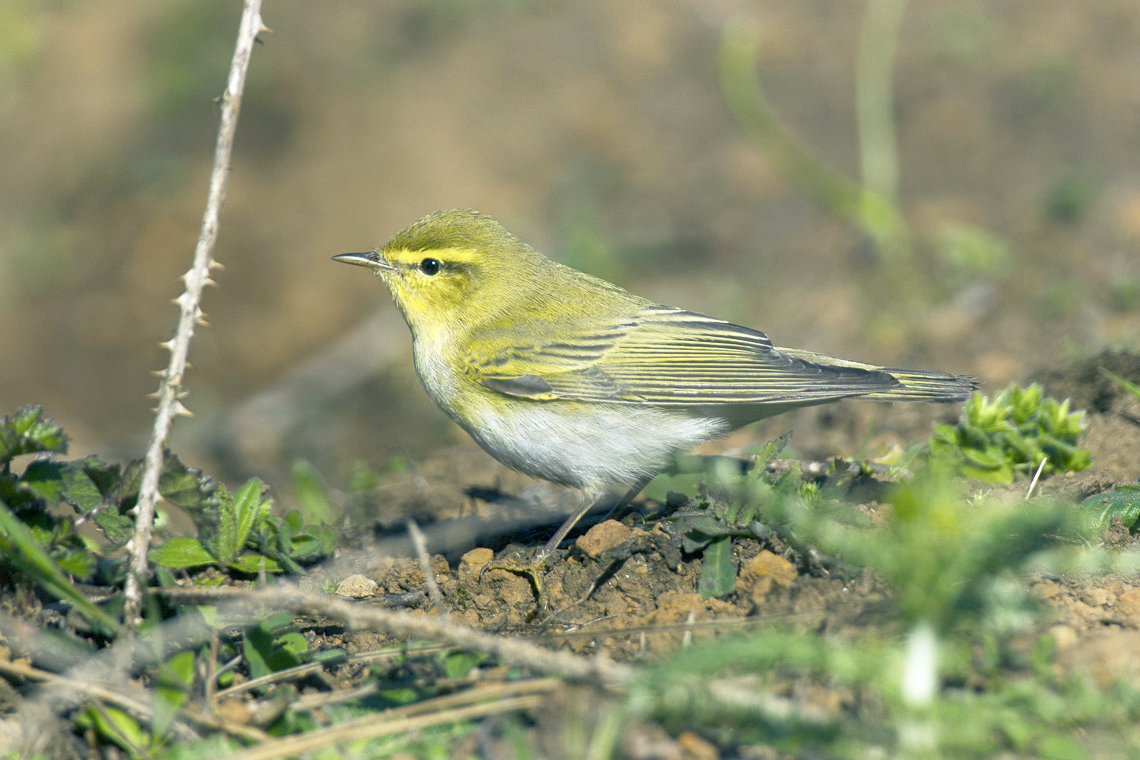
Wood warbler, Pantelleria

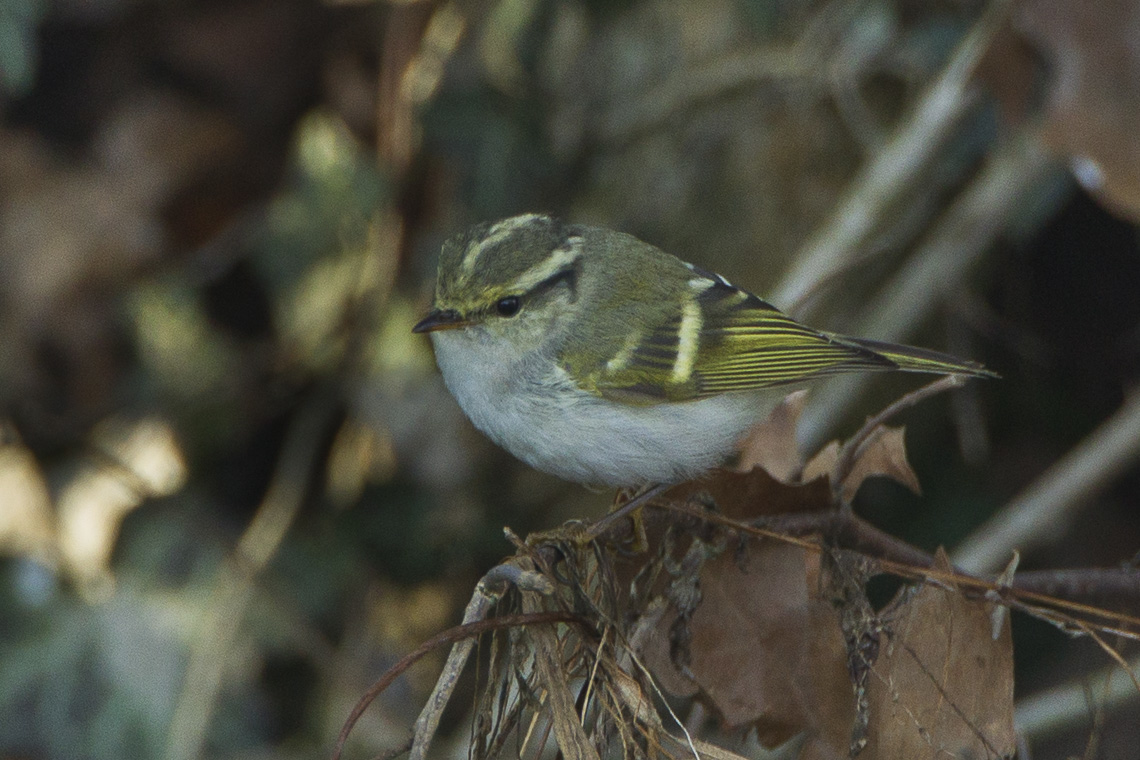
Pallas's leaf warbler, Treviso, Veneto

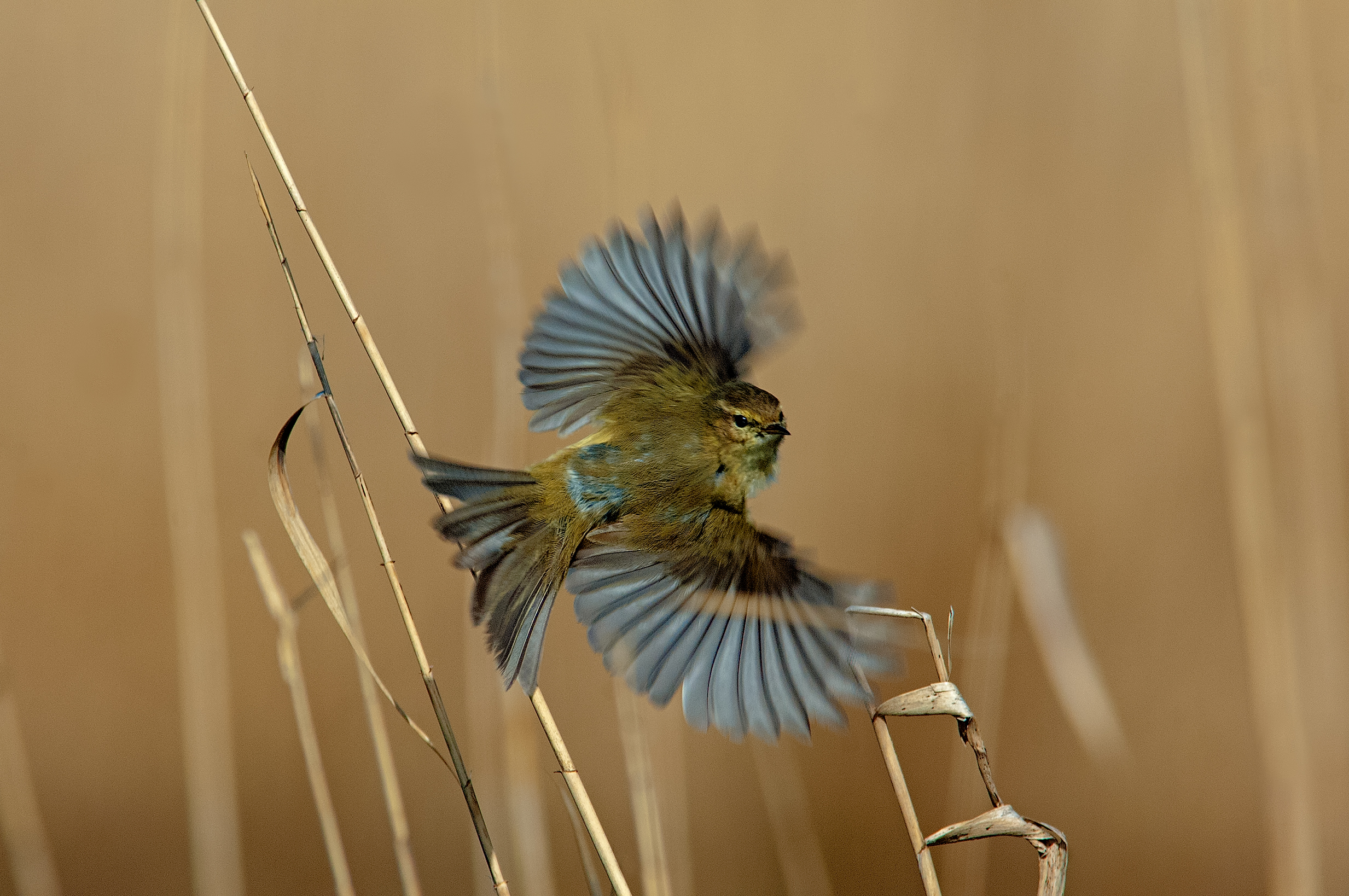
Common chiffchaff, Livorno

== Bush warblers and allies ==
Order: Passeriformes Family: Cettiidae

The members of this family are found throughout Africa, Asia, and Polynesia. Their taxonomy is in flux, and some authorities place most of the genera, including the genus below, in the family Cettiidae.

- Cetti's warbler Cettia cetti Usignolo di fiume – A
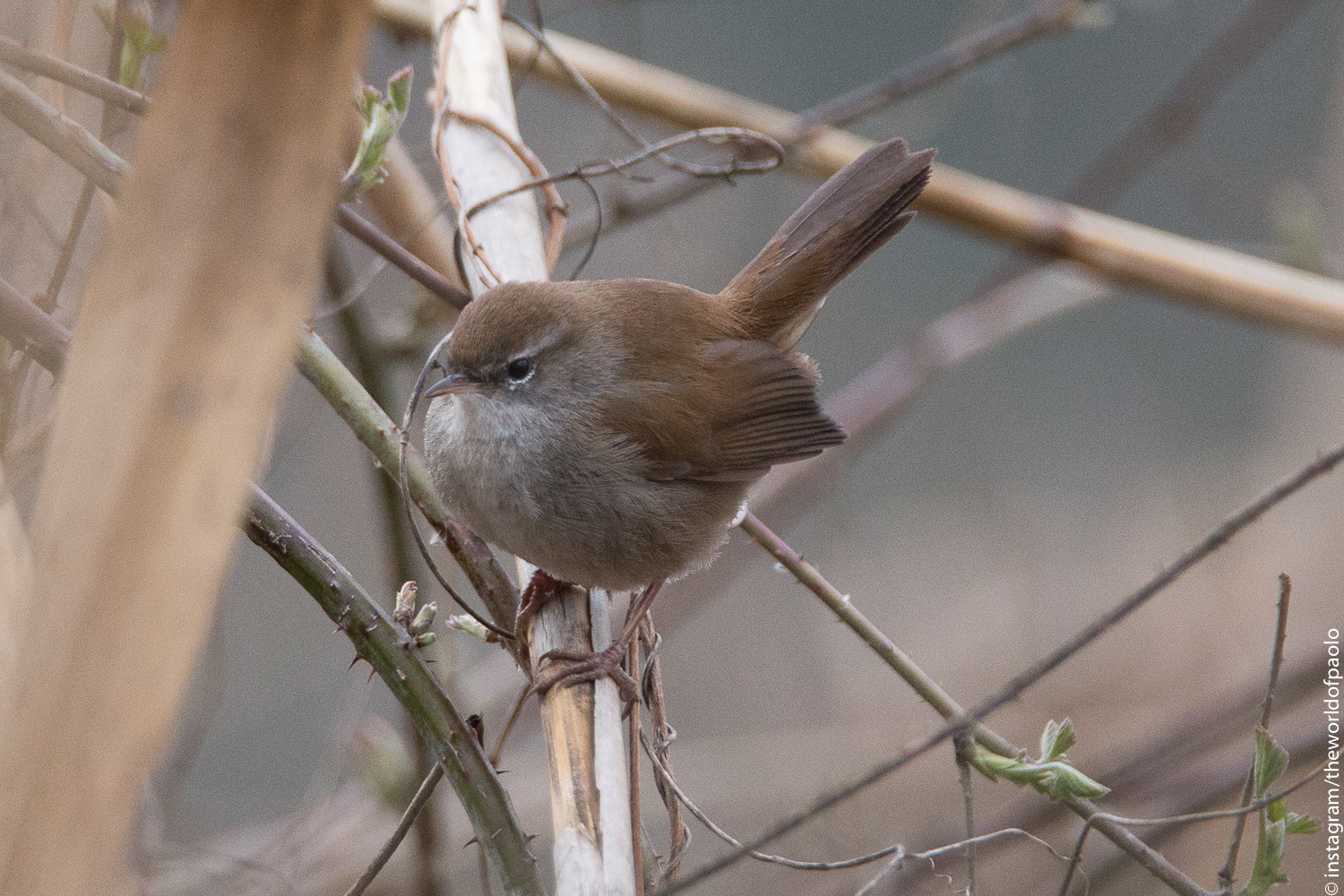
Cetti's warbler, Bergamo, Lombardy

== Long-tailed tits ==
Order: Passeriformes Family: Aegithalidae

Long-tailed tits are a group of small passerine birds with medium to long tails. They make woven bag nests in trees. Most eat a mixed diet which includes insects.

- Long-tailed tit, Aegithalos caudatus Codibugnolo – A
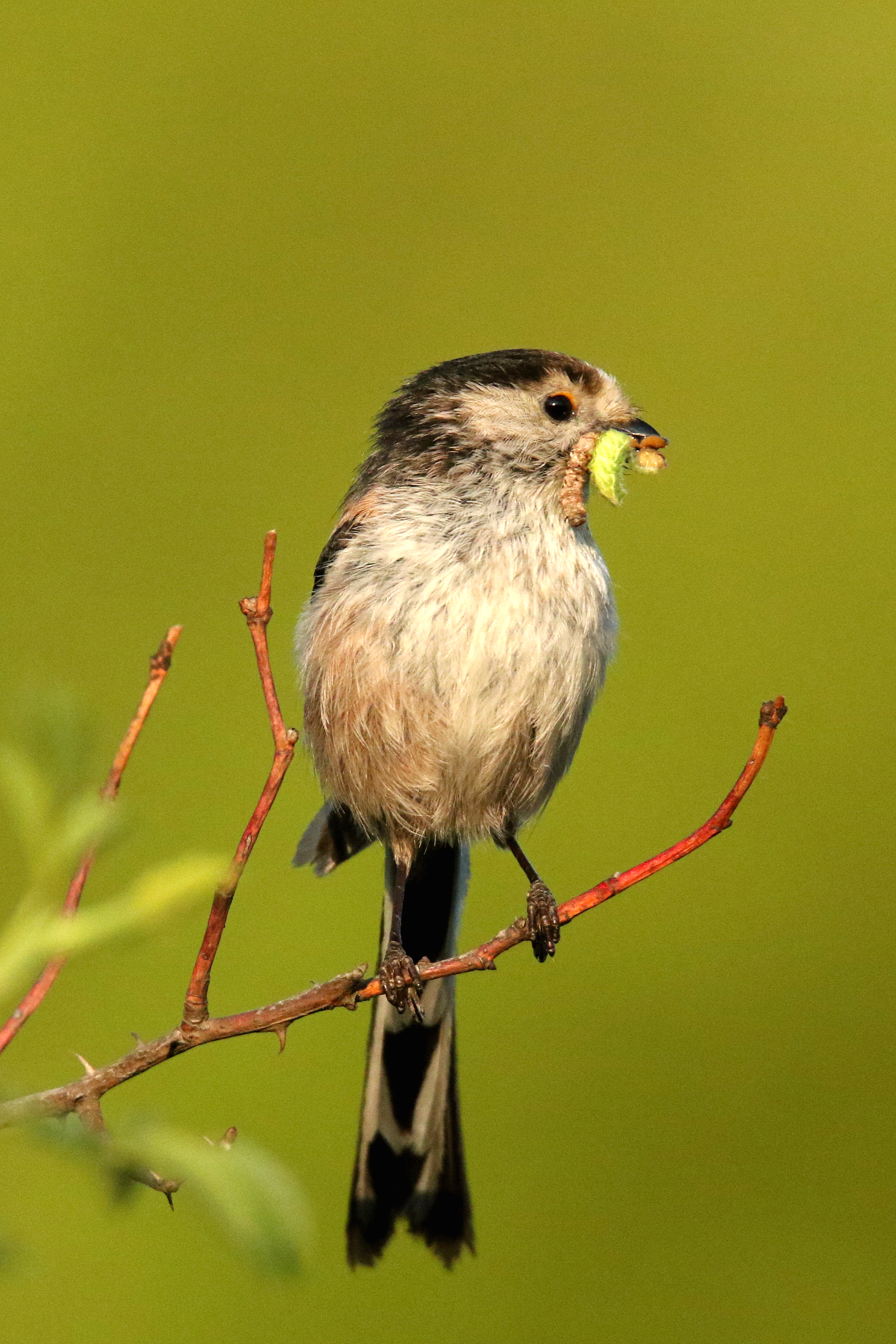
Long-tailed tit, near Villalvernia, Alessandria, Piedmont

== Sylviid warblers ==
Order: Passeriformes Family: Sylviidae

The family Sylviidae is a group of small insectivorous passerine birds. They mainly occur as breeding species in Europe, Asia and Africa. Most are of generally undistinguished appearance, but many have distinctive songs.

- Eurasian blackcap Sylvia atricapilla Capinera – A
- Garden warbler Sylvia borin Beccafico – A
- African desert warbler Curruca deserti Sterpazzola del deserto – A
- Asian desert warbler Curruca nana Sterpazzola nana – A
- Barred warbler Curruca nisoria Bigia padovana – A
- Western Orphean warbler Curruca hortensis Bigia grossa occidentale – A
- Eastern Orphean warbler Curruca crassirostris Bigia grossa orientale – A
- Lesser whitethroat Curruca curruca Bigiarella – A
- Menetries's warbler Curruca mystacea Occhiocotto di Ménétries – A
- Cyprus warbler Curruca melanothorax Occhiocotto di Cipro – A
- Sardinian warbler Curruca melanocephala Occhiocotto – A
- Eastern subalpine warbler Curruca cantillans Sterpazzolina – A
  - (including western subalpine warbler C. iberiae, treated as subspecies in HBW/BLI taxonomy)
- Moltoni's warbler Curruca subalpina Sterpazzolina di Moltoni – A
- Rüppell's warbler Curruca ruppeli Bigia di Rueppell – A
- Greater whitethroat Curruca communis Sterpazzola – A
- Spectacled warbler Curruca conspicillata Sterpazzola della Sardegna – A
- Marmora's warbler Curruca sarda Magnanina sarda – A
- Dartford warbler Curruca undata Magnanina – A
- Tristram's warbler Curruca deserticola Magnanina di Tristram – A
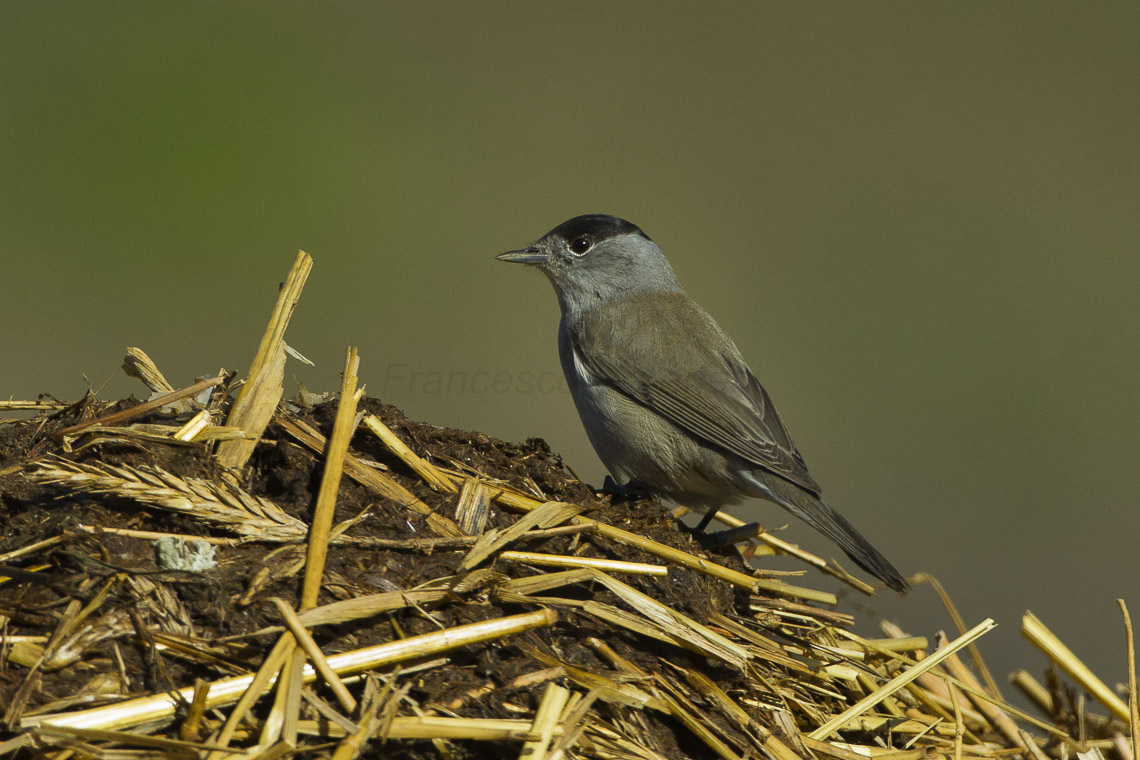
Eurasian blackcap, Aosta Valley

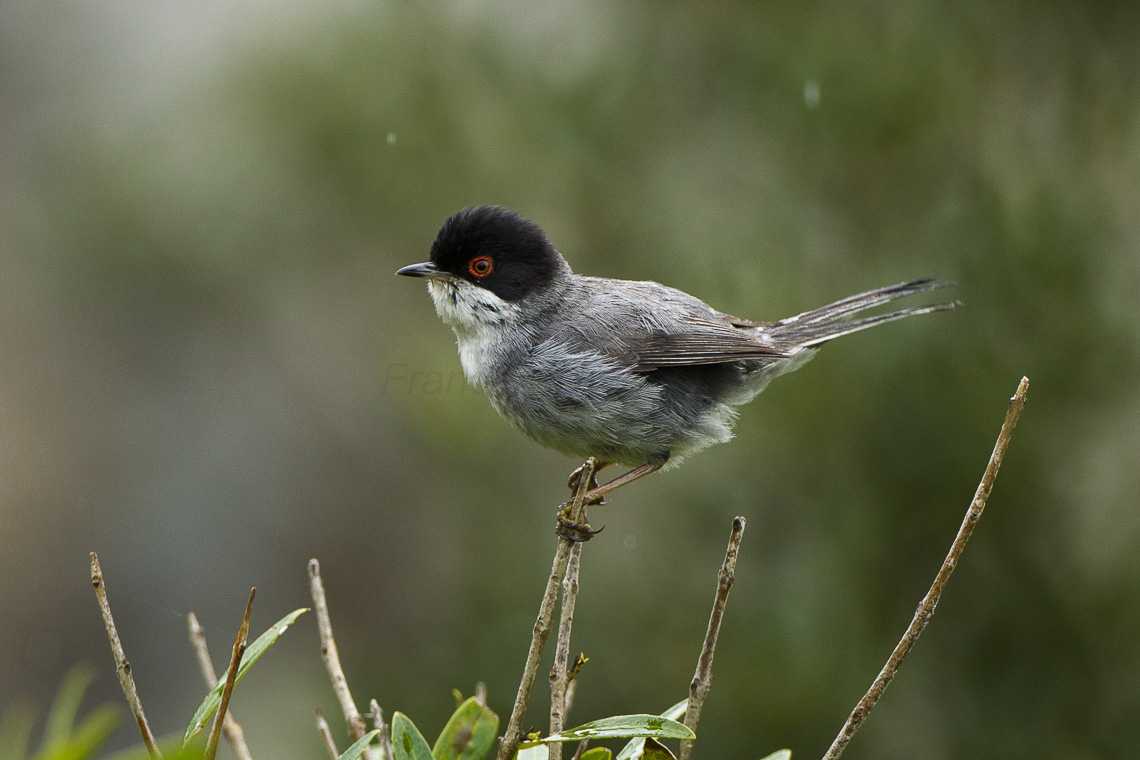
Sardinian Warbler, Sardinia

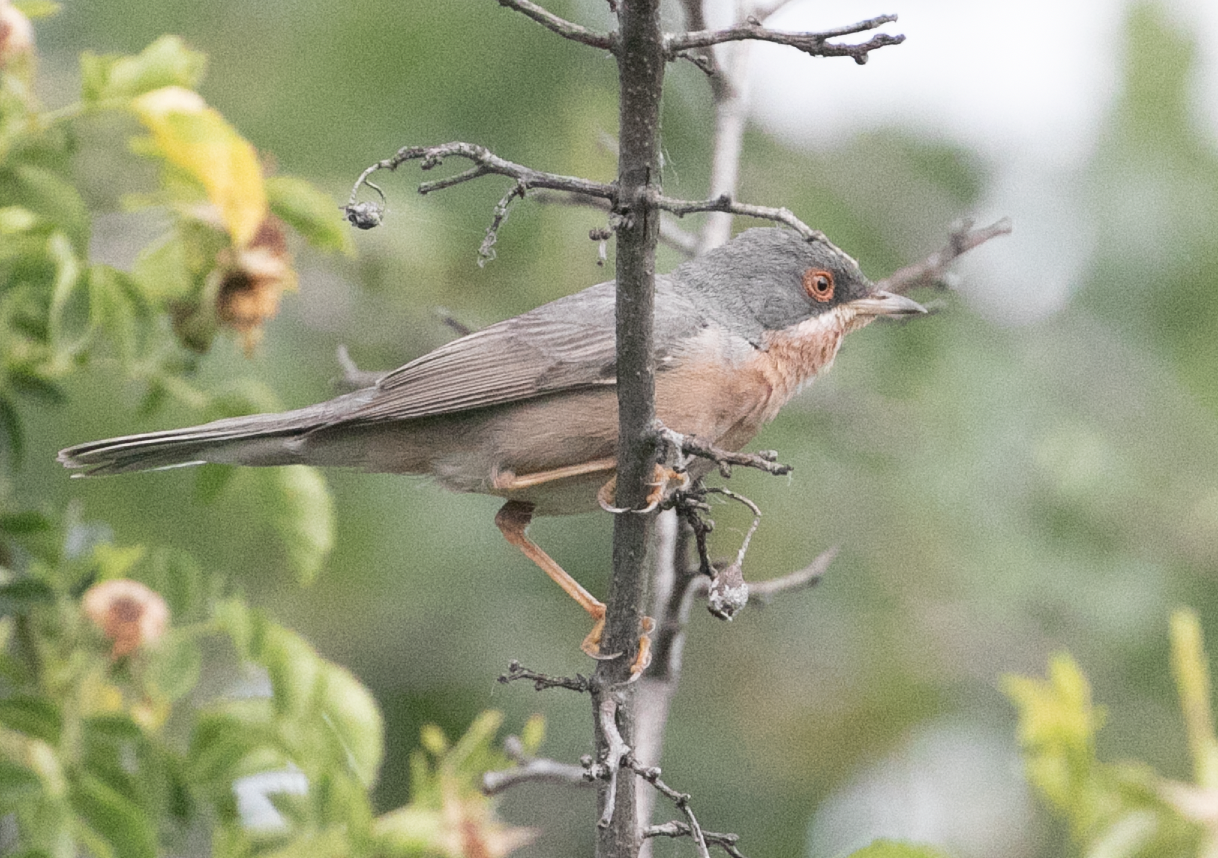
Moltoni's warbler, Piedmont

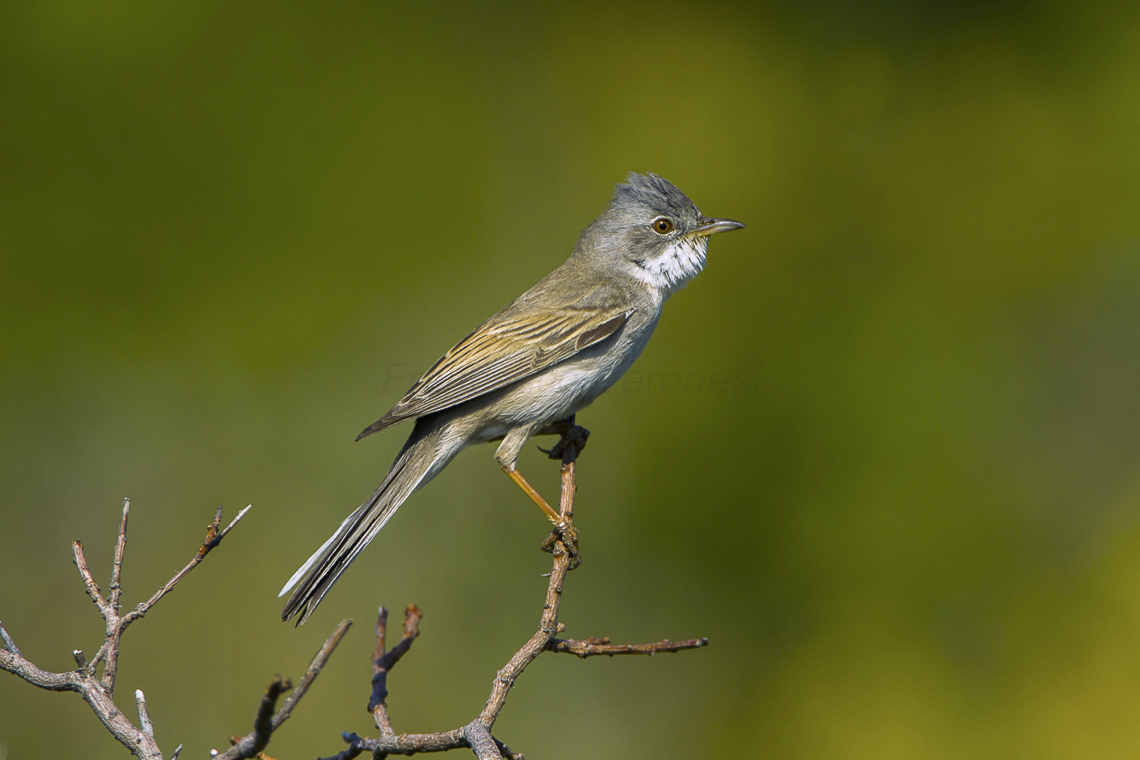
Greater whitethroat, Carso

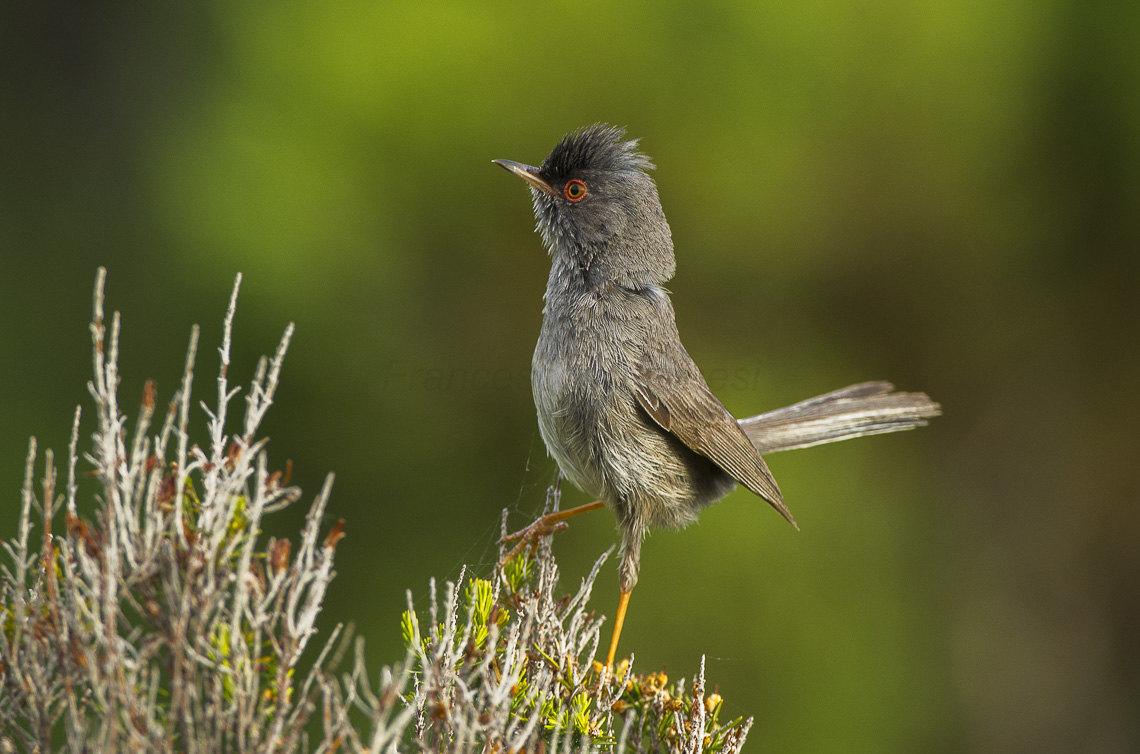
Marmora's warbler, Sardinia

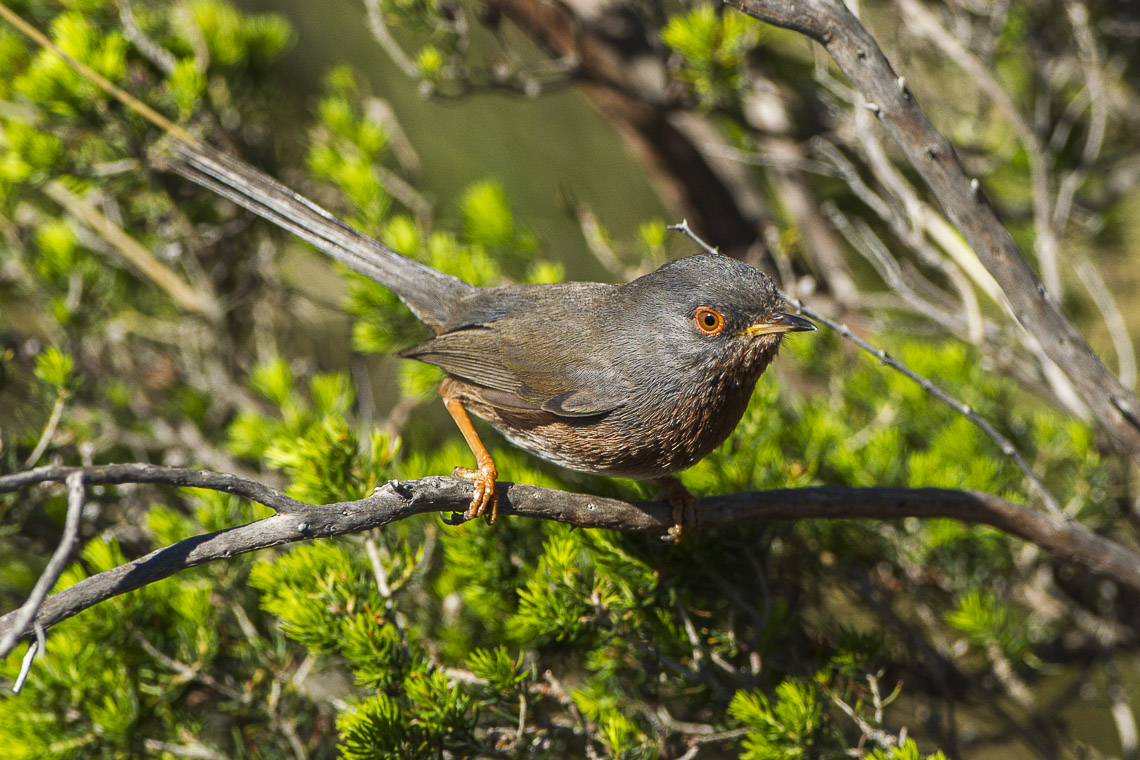
Dartford warbler, Arenzano

== Parrotbills ==
Order: Passeriformes Family: Paradoxornithidae

These two parrotbills, from eastern Asia, have become established locally in northern Italy from escaped cagebirds.

- Vinous-throated parrotbill Suthora webbiana Panuro di Webb – C
- Ashy-throated parrotbill Suthora alphonsiana Panuro golacenerina – C
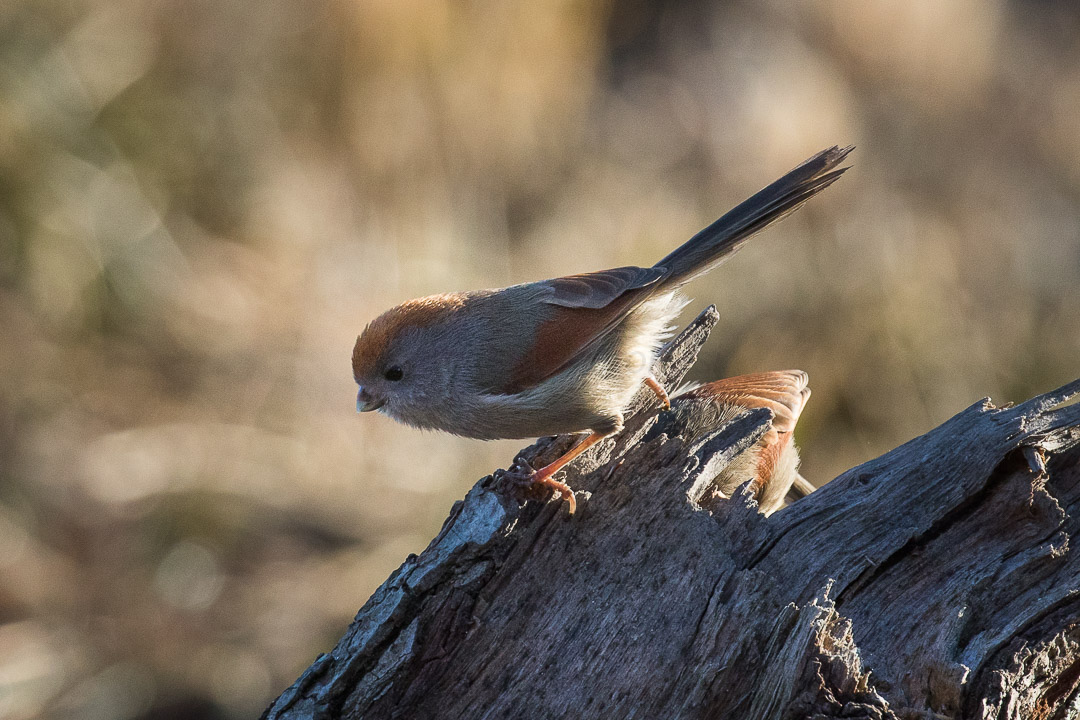
Vinous-throated parrotbill, Palude Brabbia Nature Reserve, Inarzo, Lombardy

== Laughingthrushes and allies ==
Order: Passeriformes Family: Leiothrichidae

The laughingthrushes are a family of Asian passerine birds, diverse in size and colour. One species has become established in Italy from escaped cagebirds.

- Red-billed leiothrix Leiothrix lutea Usignolo del Giappone – C
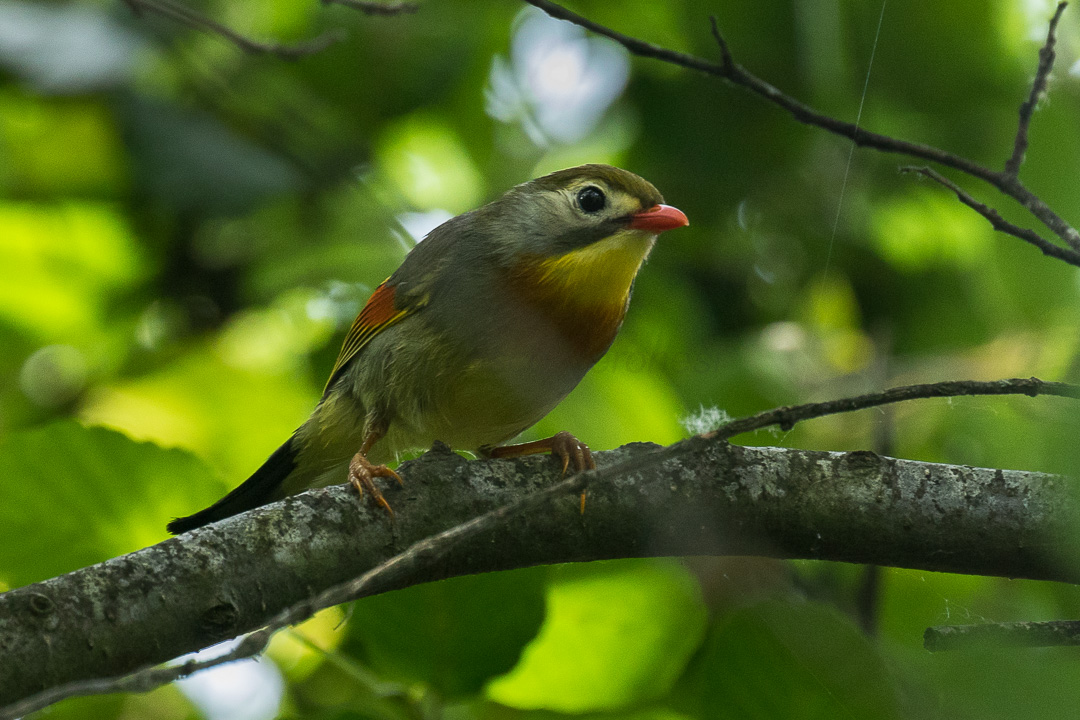
Red-billed leiothrix, Massaciuccoli

== Treecreepers ==
Order: Passeriformes Family: Certhiidae

Treecreepers are small woodland birds, brown above and white below. They have thin pointed down-curved bills, which they use to extract insects from bark. They have stiff tail feathers, like woodpeckers, which they use to support themselves on vertical trees.

- Short-toed treecreeper Certhia brachydactyla Rampichino comune – A
- Eurasian treecreeper Certhia familiaris Rampichino alpestre – A
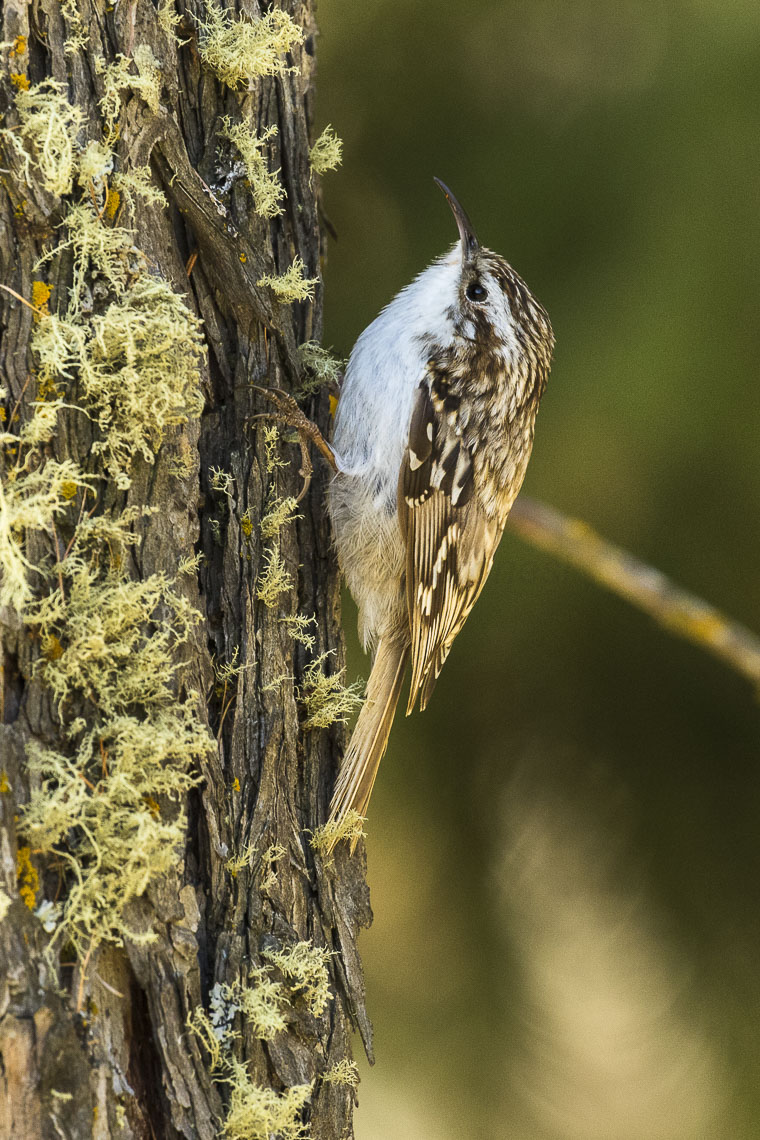
Short-toed treecreeper, Aosta Valley

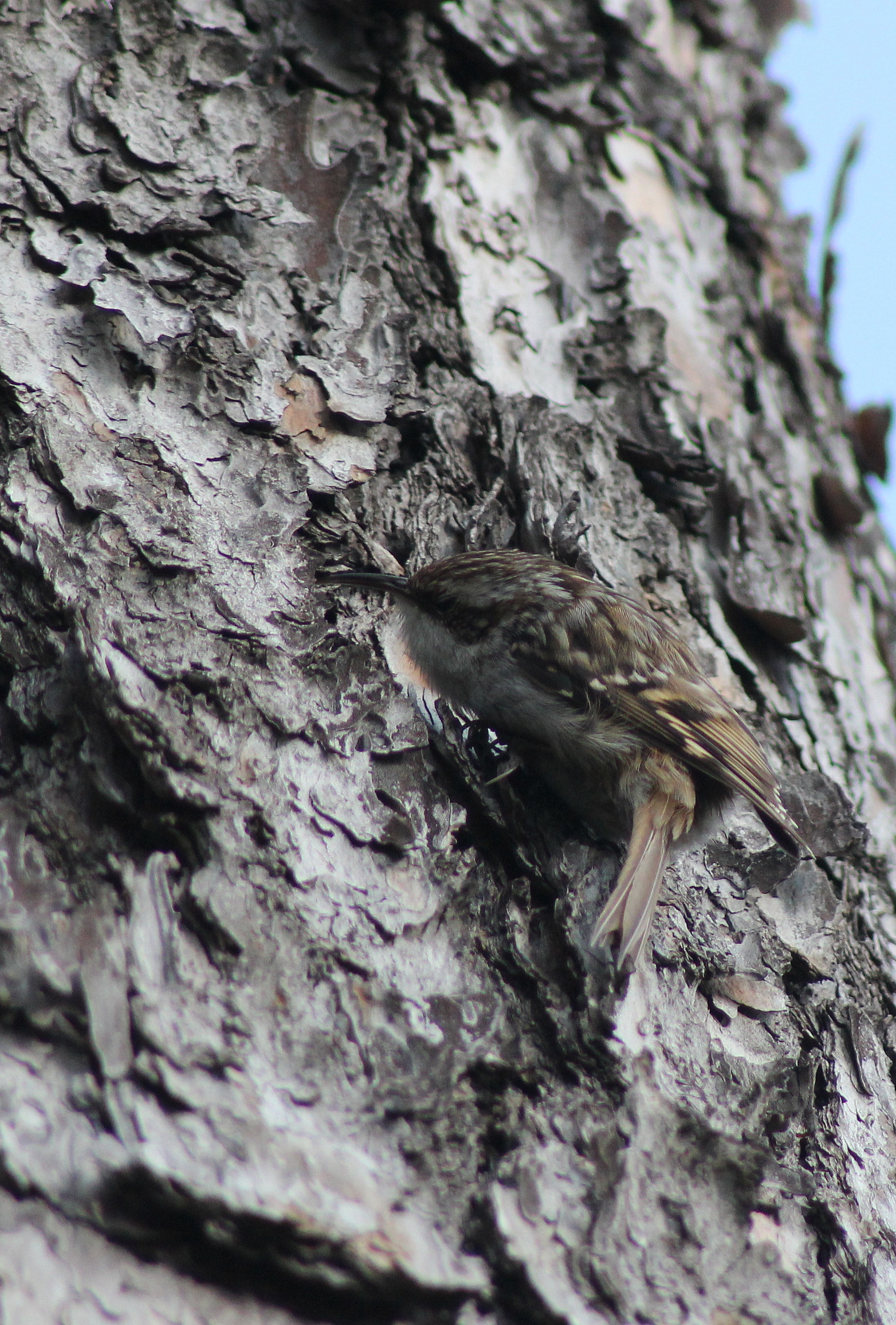
Eurasian treecreeper, Rome

== Nuthatches ==
Order: Passeriformes Family: Sittidae

Nuthatches are small woodland birds. They have the unusual ability to climb down trees head first, unlike other birds which can only go upwards. Nuthatches have big heads, short tails and powerful bills and feet. The wallcreeper, treated in the family Tichodromidae by other authorities, is included in the related Sittidae by the HBW/BLI taxonomy.

- Eurasian nuthatch Sitta europaea Picchio muratore – A
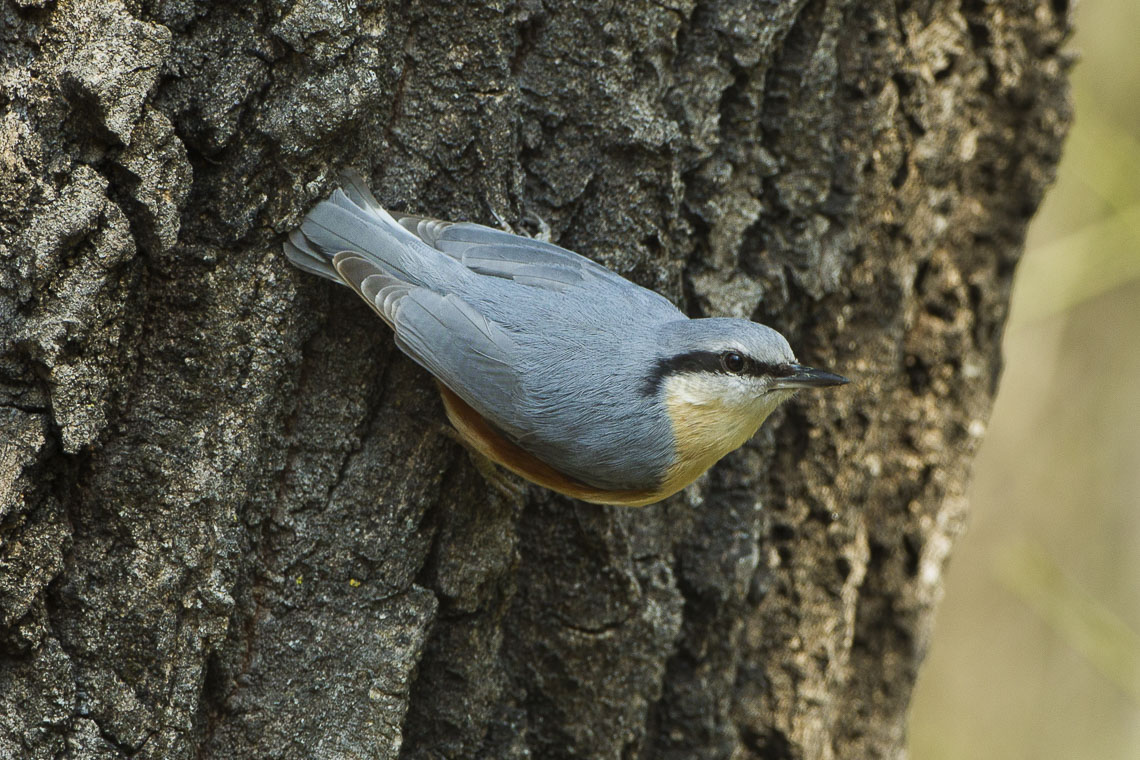
Eurasian nuthatch, Aosta Valley

== Wallcreeper ==
Order: Passeriformes Family: Tichodromidae

This species, the only extant one in its family, is found in high mountains of the Palearctic from southern Europe to central China.

- Wallcreeper Tichodroma muraria Picchio muraiolo – A
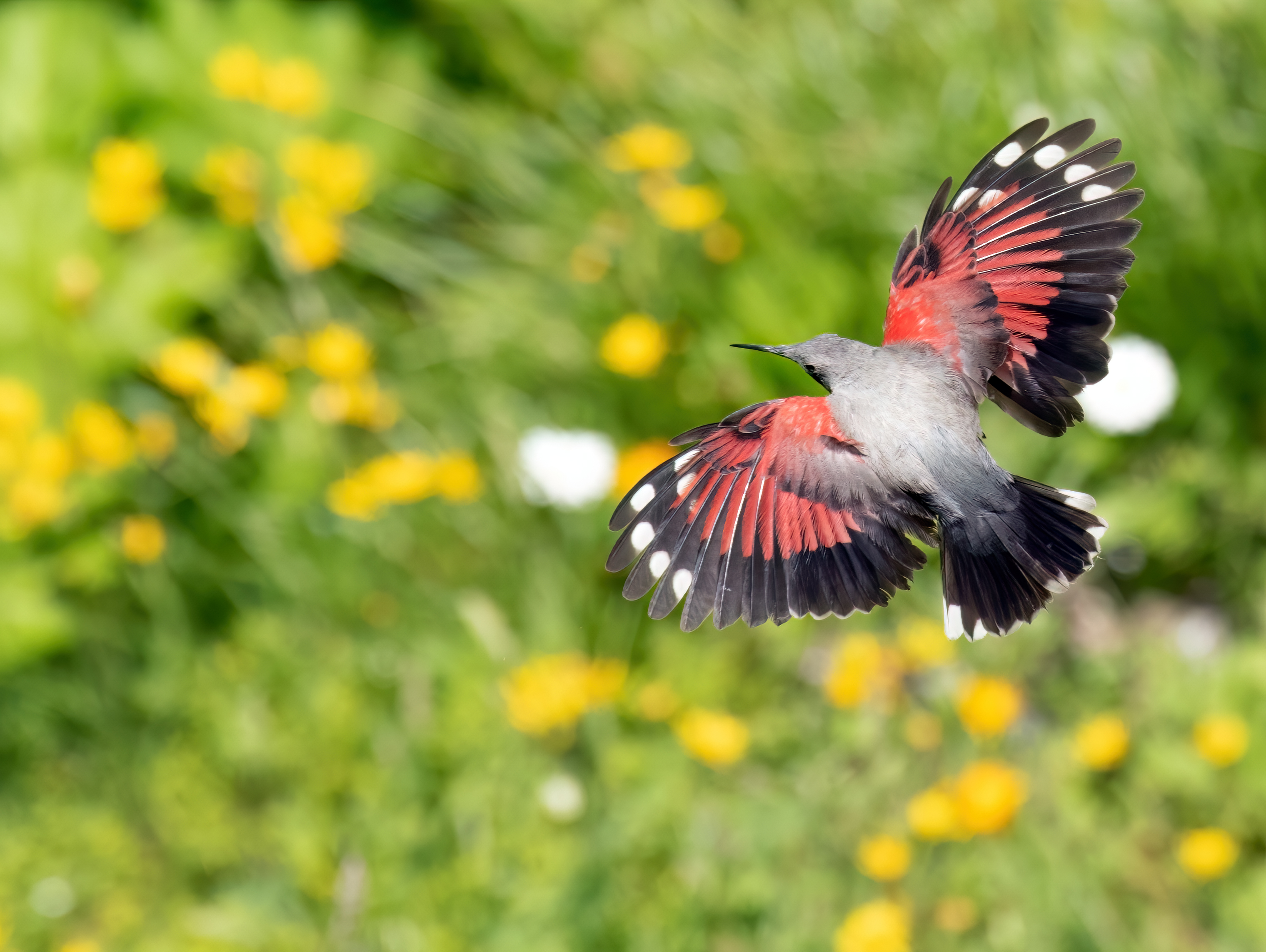
Wallcreeper

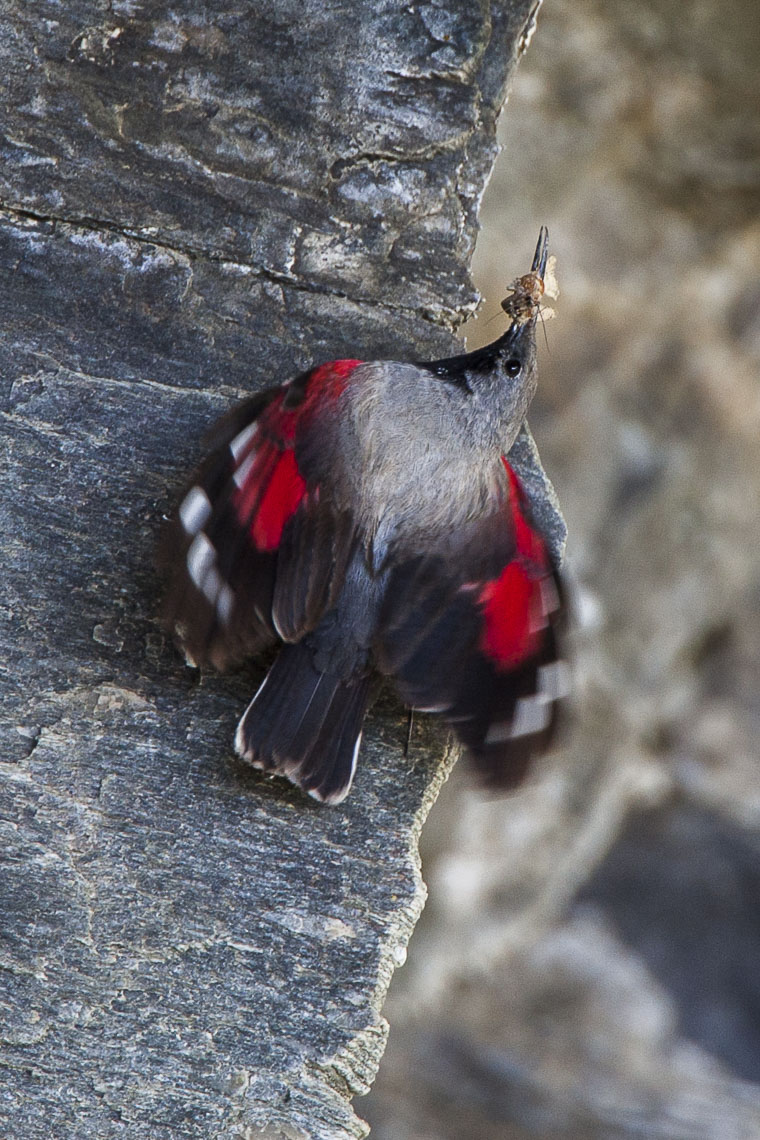
Wallcreeper, Aosta Valley

== Wrens ==
Order: Passeriformes Family: Troglodytidae

The wrens are mainly small and inconspicuous except for their loud songs. These birds have short wings and thin down-turned bills. Several species often hold their tails upright. All are insectivorous. All but one species, the Eurasian wren, are found in the Americas.

- Eurasian wren Troglodytes troglodytes Scricciolo – A

== Dippers ==
Order: Passeriformes Family: Cinclidae

Dippers are a group of perching birds of fast-flowing river environments in the Americas, Europe and Asia. They are named from their bobbing or dipping movements.

- White-throated dipper Cinclus cinclus Merlo acquaiolo – A
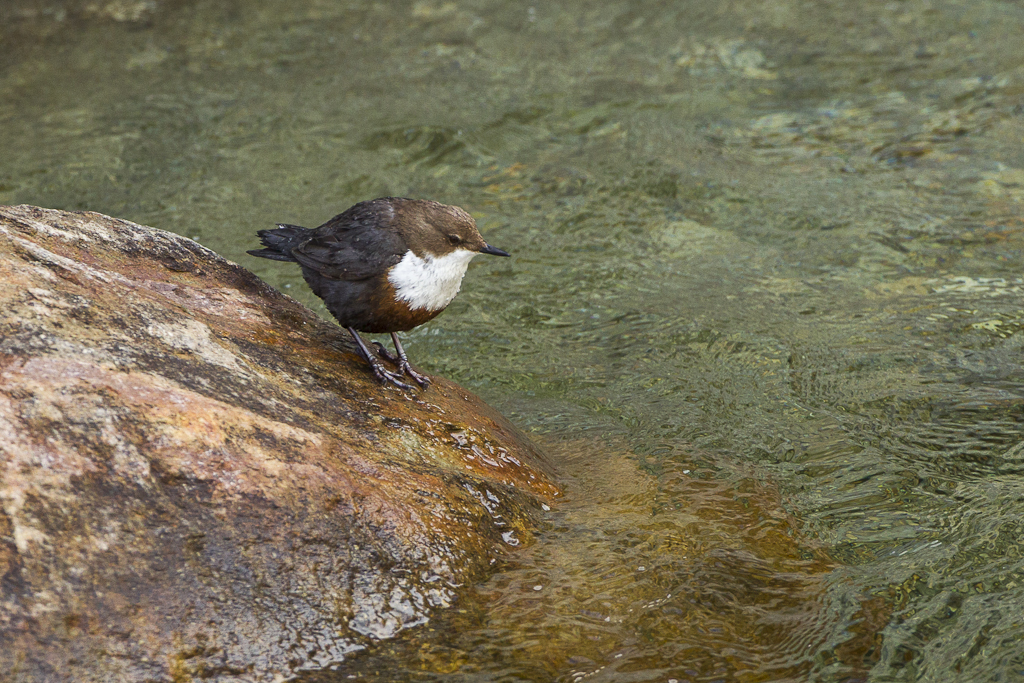
White-throated dipper, Aosta Valley

== Starlings ==
Order: Passeriformes Family: Sturnidae

Starlings are small to medium-sized passerine birds. Their flight is strong and direct and they are very gregarious. Their preferred habitat is fairly open country. They eat insects and fruit. Plumage is typically dark with a metallic sheen.

- Common starling Sturnus vulgaris Storno – A
- Spotless starling Sturnus unicolor Storno nero – A
- Rosy starling Pastor roseus Storno roseo – A
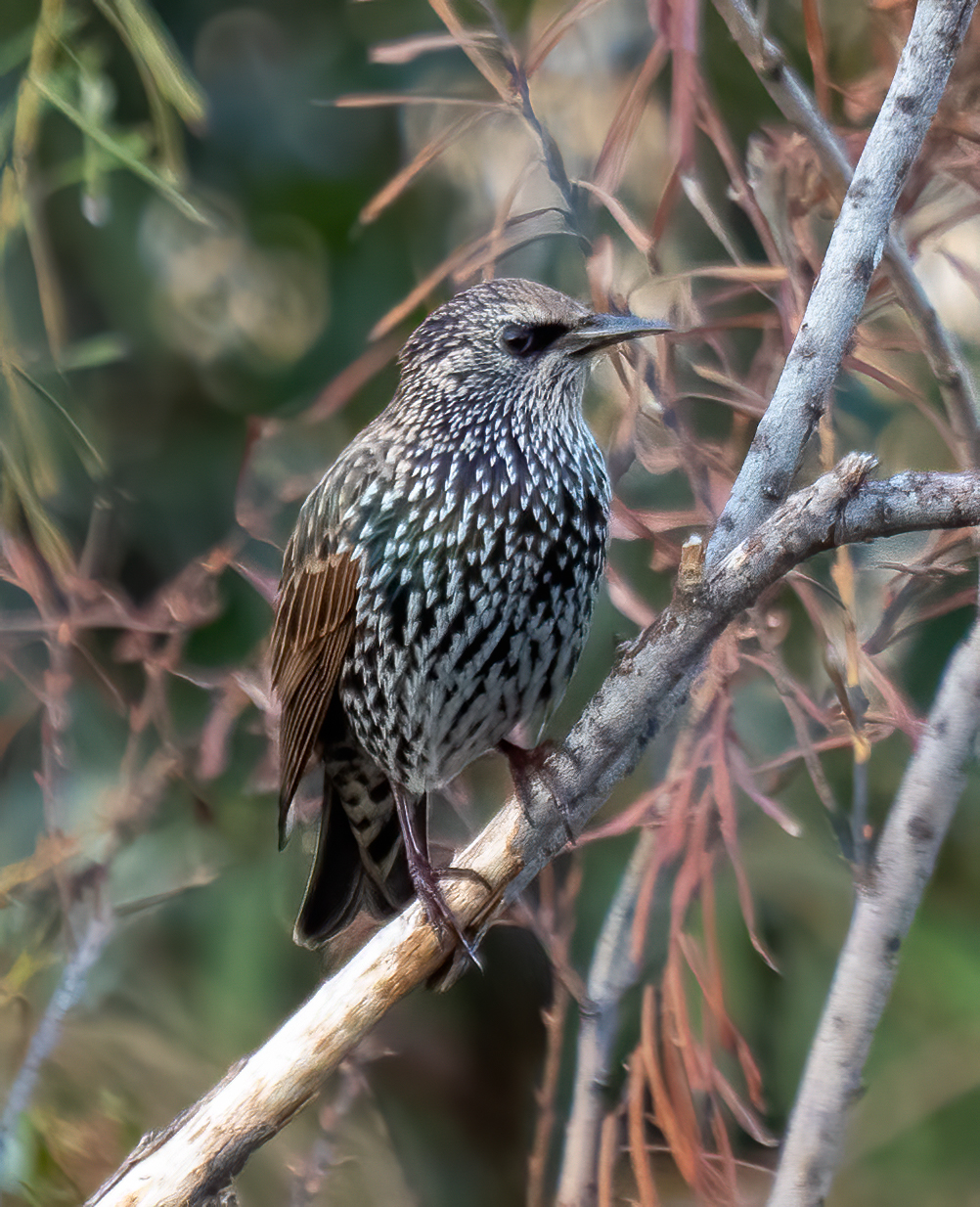
European starling, Florence

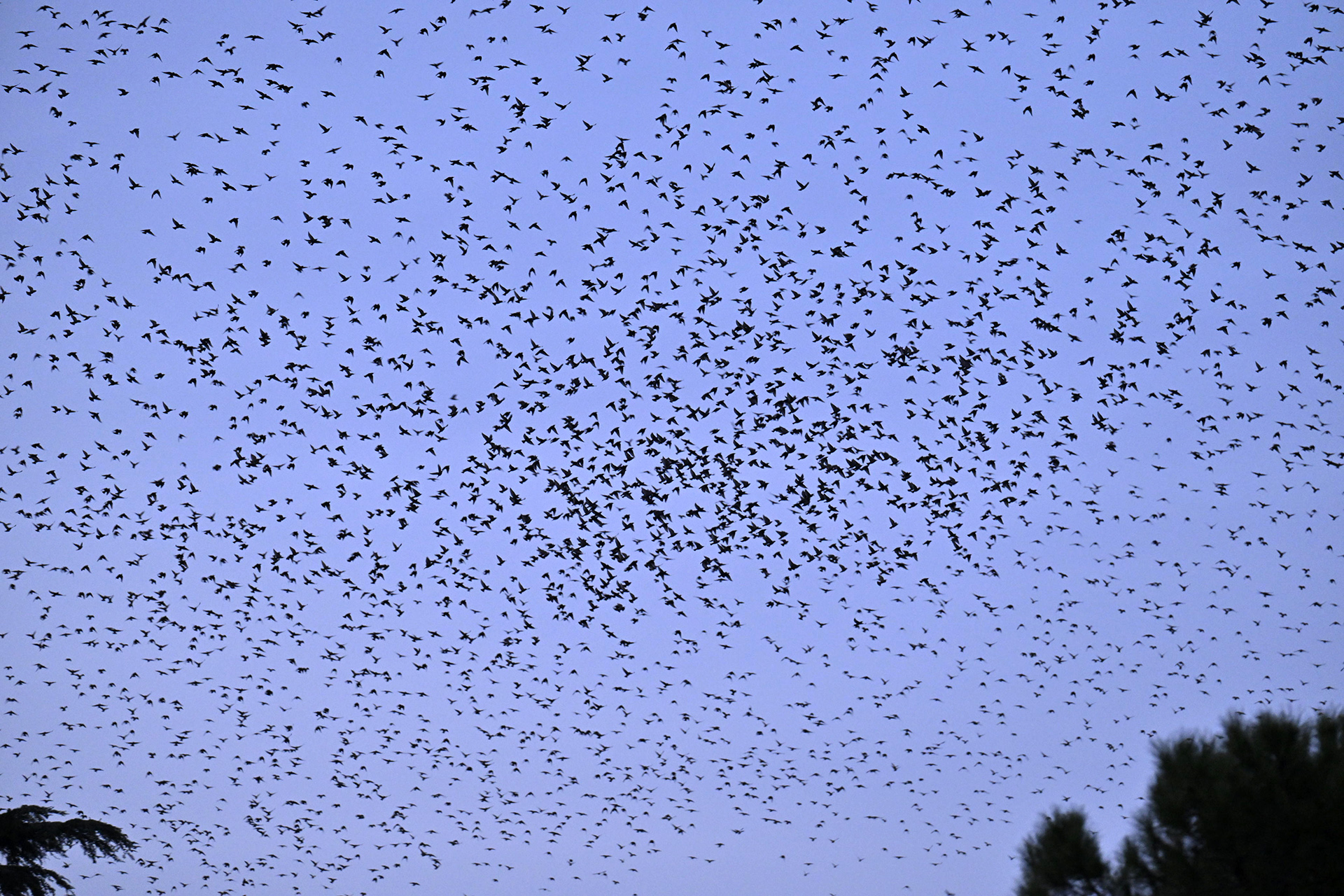
European starlings, Roma Termini railway station, Rome

== Thrushes and allies ==
Order: Passeriformes Family: Turdidae

The thrushes are a group of passerine birds that occur mainly in the Old World. They are plump, soft plumaged, small to medium-sized insectivores or sometimes omnivores, often feeding on the ground. Many have attractive songs.

- White's thrush Zoothera aurea Tordo dorato – A
- Swainson's thrush Catharus swainsoni Tordo di Swainson – A
- Gray-cheeked thrush Catharus minimus Tordo di Baird – B
- Hermit thrush Catharus guttatus Tordo di Pallas – B
- Siberian thrush Geokichla sibirica Tordo siberiano – B
- Mistle thrush Turdus viscivorus Tordela – A
- Song thrush Turdus philomelos Tordo bottaccio – A
- Redwing Turdus iliacus Tordo sassello – A
- Eurasian blackbird Turdus merula Merlo – A
- Eyebrowed thrush Turdus obscurus Tordo oscuro – A
- Fieldfare Turdus pilaris Cesena – A
- Ring ouzel Turdus torquatus Merlo dal collare – A
- Naumann's thrush Turdus naumanni Cesena di Naumann – A
- Dusky thrush Turdus eunomus Cesena fosca – A
- Black-throated thrush Turdus atrogularis Tordo golanera – A
- Red-throated thrush Turdus ruficollis Tordo golarossa – A
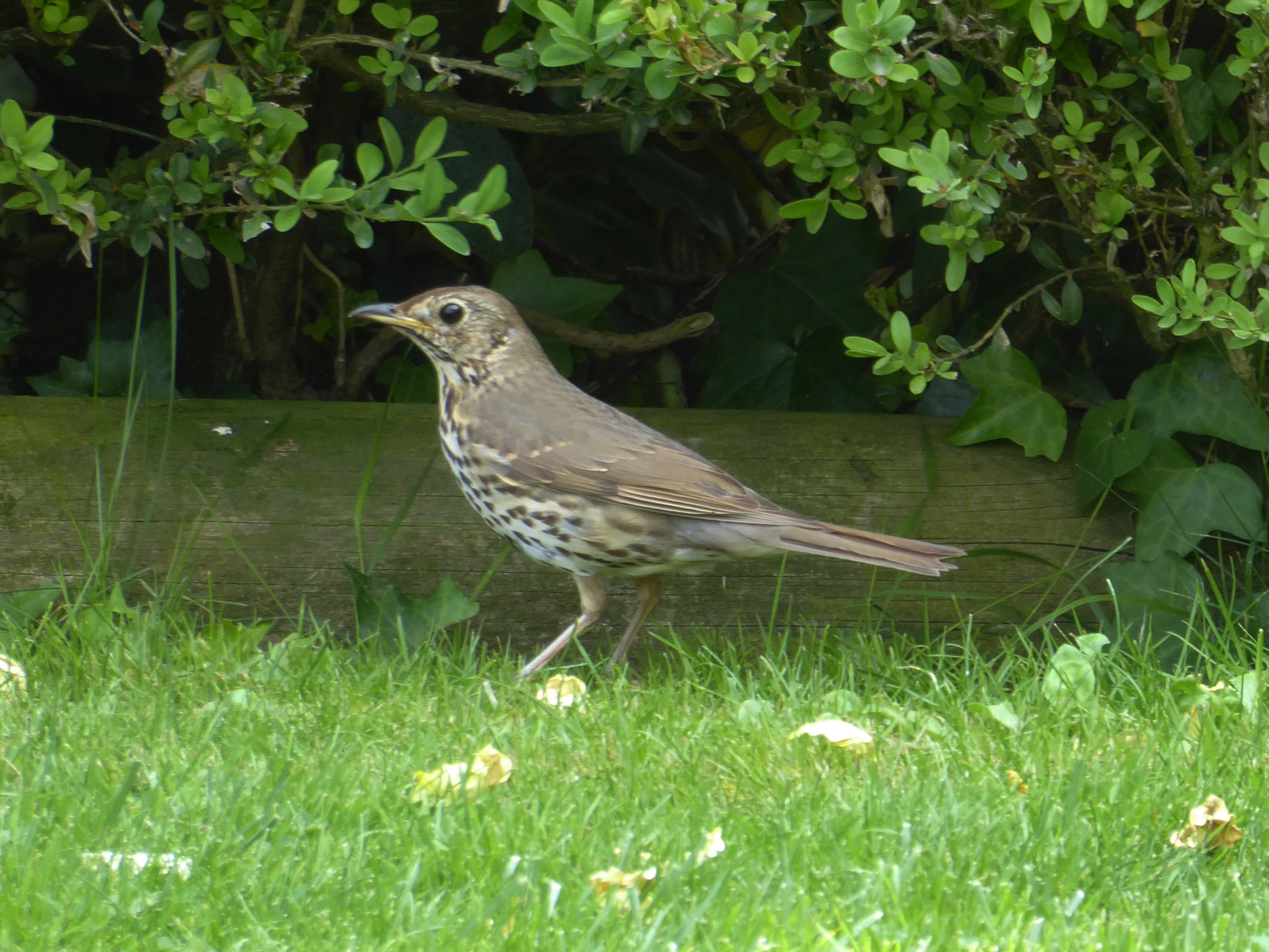
Song thrush, Villa Margone, Trento

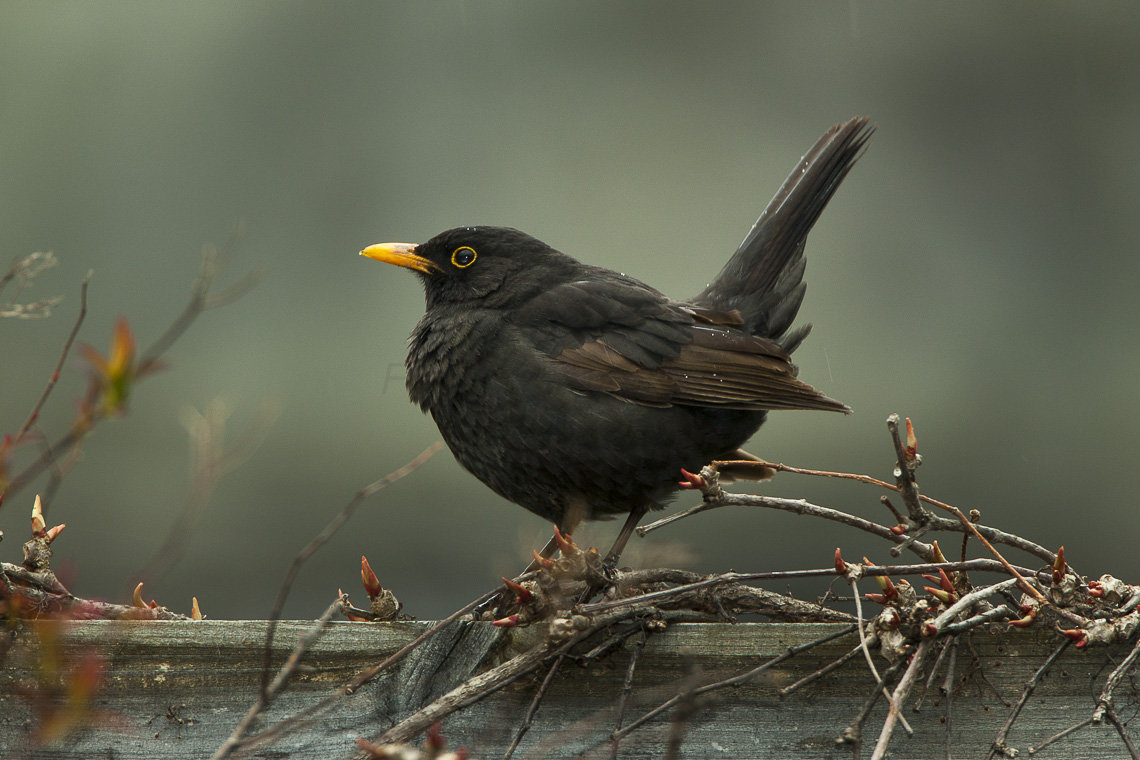
Eurasian blackbird, Italy

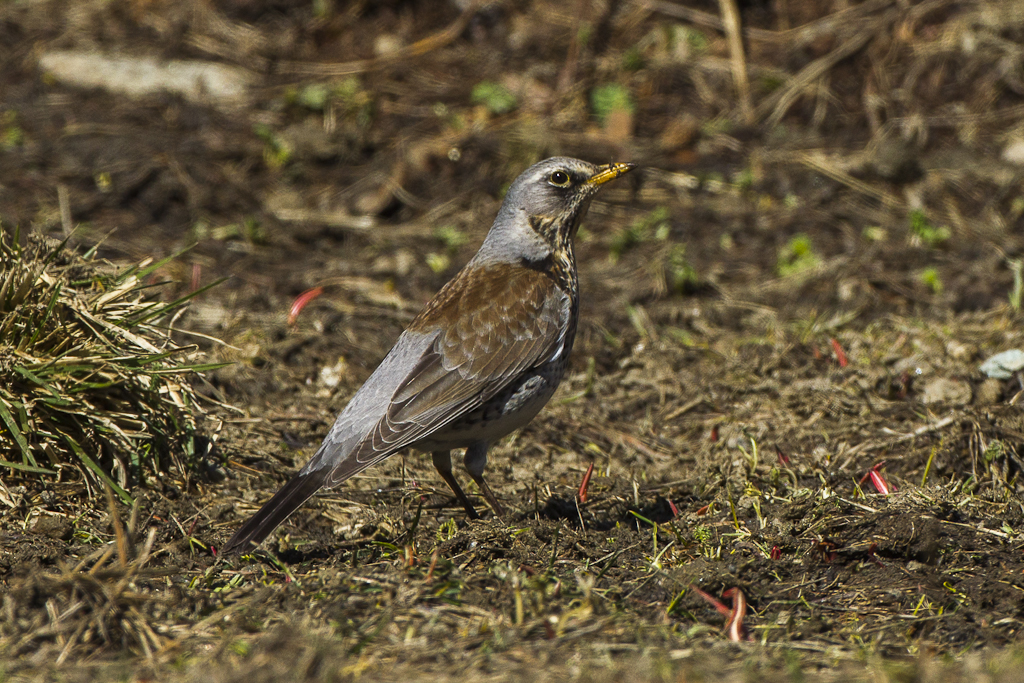
Fieldfare, Aosta Valley

== Chats and Old World flycatchers ==
Order: Passeriformes Family: Muscicapidae

The chats and Old World flycatchers are a large group of small passerine birds native to the Old World. They are mainly small insectivores, arboreal or from open habitats. The appearance of these birds is highly varied, but they mostly have musical songs and harsh calls.

- Rufous-tailed scrub robin Cercotrichas galactotes Usignolo d'Africa – A
- Spotted flycatcher Muscicapa striata Pigliamosche
  - (including Mediterranean flycatcher Muscicapa tyrrhenica as a subspecies per HBW/BLI taxonomy) – A
- European robin Erithacus rubecula Pettirosso – A
- Bluethroat Luscinia svecica Pettazzurro – A
- Thrush nightingale Luscinia luscinia Usignolo maggiore – A
- Common nightingale Luscinia megarhynchos Usignolo – A
- Siberian rubythroat Calliope calliope Calliope – B
- Red-flanked bluetail Tarsiger cyanurus Codazzurro – A
- Mugimaki flycatcher Ficedula mugimaki Pigliamosche mugimaki – A
- Red-breasted flycatcher Ficedula parva Pigliamosche pettirosso – A
- Semicollared flycatcher Ficedula semitorquata Balia caucasica – A
- European pied flycatcher Ficedula hypoleuca Balia nera
  - (including Atlas flycatcher Ficedula speculigera as a subspecies per HBW/BLI taxonomy) – A
- Collared flycatcher Ficedula albicollis Balia dal collare – A
- Black redstart Phoenicurus ochruros Codirosso spazzacamino – A
- Common redstart Phoenicurus phoenicurus Codirosso – A
- Moussier's redstart Phoenicurus moussieri Codirosso algerino – A
- Rufous-tailed rock thrush Monticola saxatilis Codirossone – A
- Blue rock thrush Monticola solitarius Passero solitario – A
- Whinchat Saxicola rubetra Stiaccino – A
- Pied bushchat Saxicola caprata Saltimpalo bianconero – A
- European stonechat Saxicola rubicola Saltimpalo comune – A
- Siberian stonechat Saxicola maurus Saltimpalo siberiano – A
- Northern wheatear Oenanthe oenanthe Culbianco – A
- Isabelline wheatear Oenanthe isabellina Culbianco isabellino – A
- Desert wheatear Oenanthe deserti Monachella del deserto – A
- Western black-eared wheatear Oenanthe hispanica Monachella occidentale – A
- Eastern black-eared wheatear Oenanthe melanoleuca Monachella orientale – A
- Pied wheatear Oenanthe pleschanka Monachella dorsonero – A
- Black wheatear Oenanthe leucura Monachella nera – A
- White-crowned wheatear Oenanthe leucopyga Monachella testabianca – A
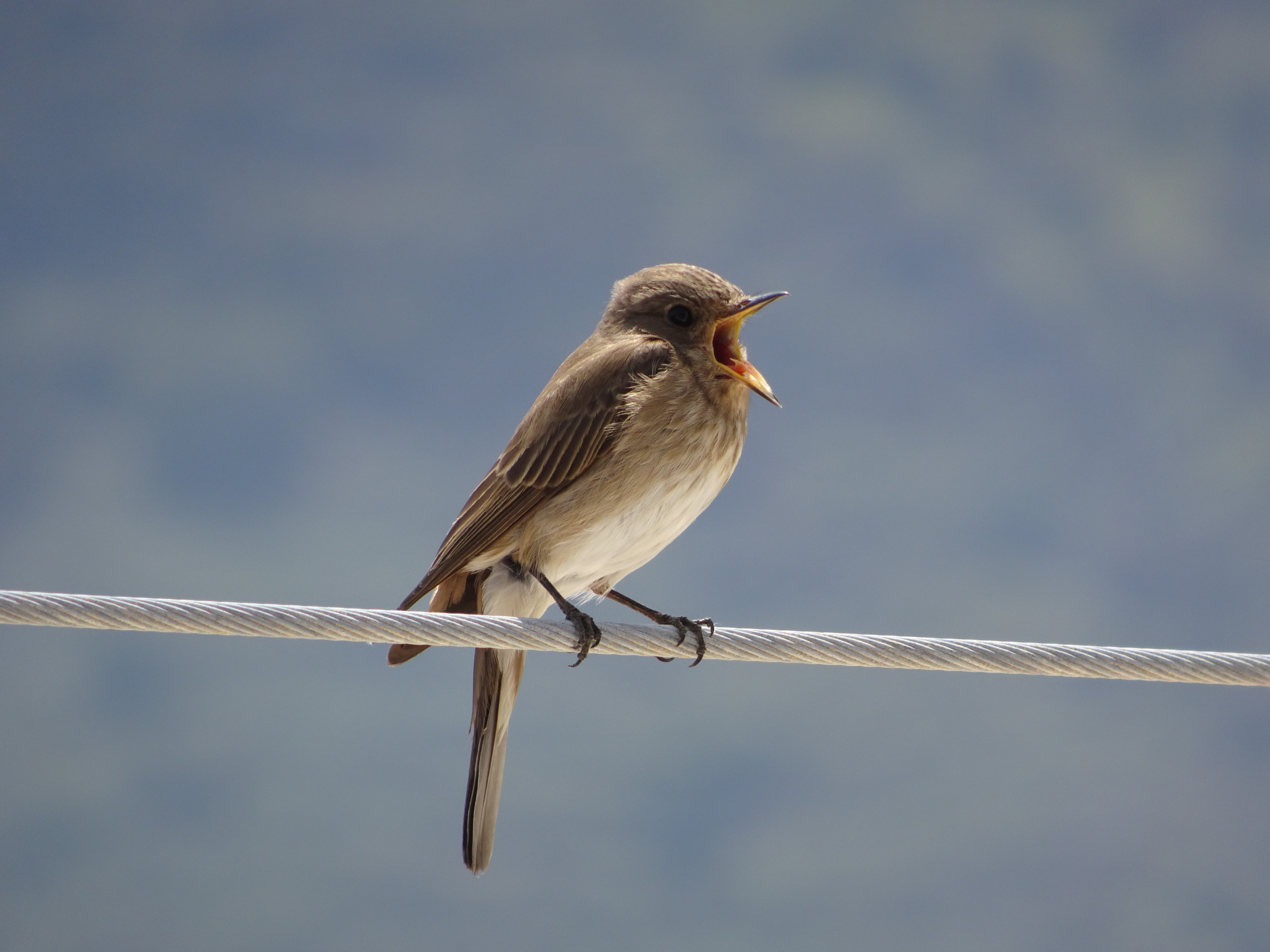
Spotted flycatcher, Lipari

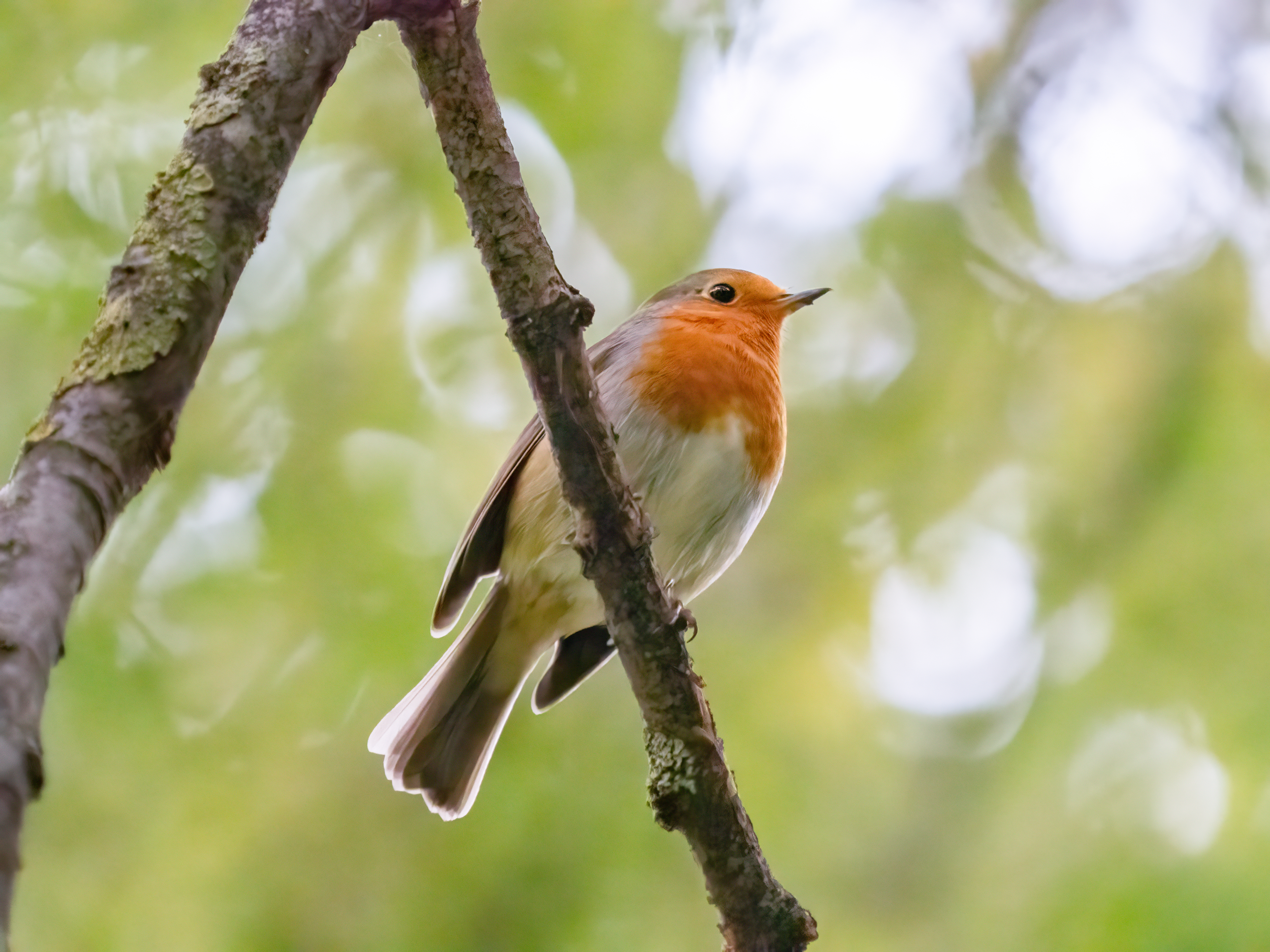
European robin, Florence

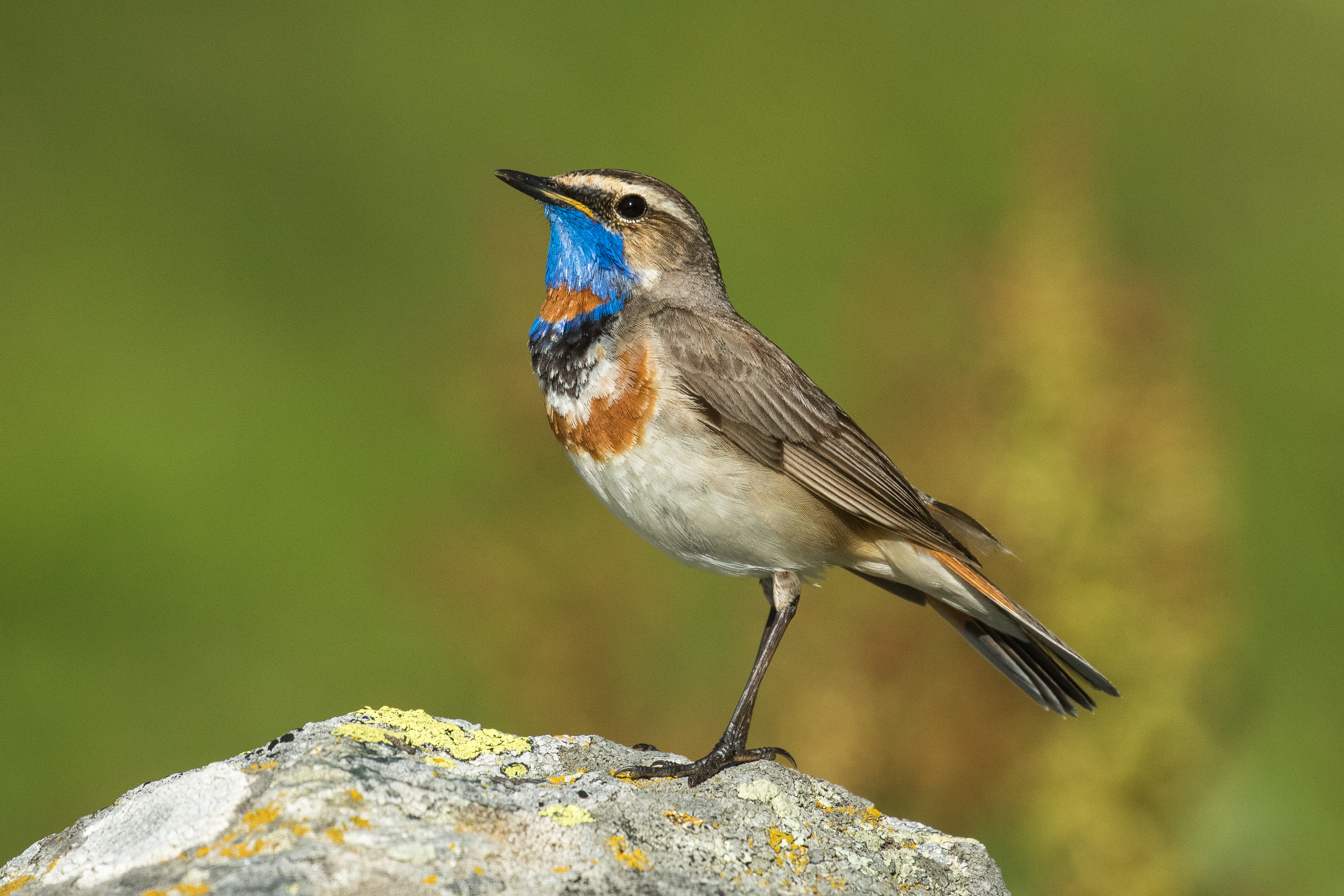
Bluethroat (subspecies Luscinia svecica svecica), Montespluga, Italian Alps

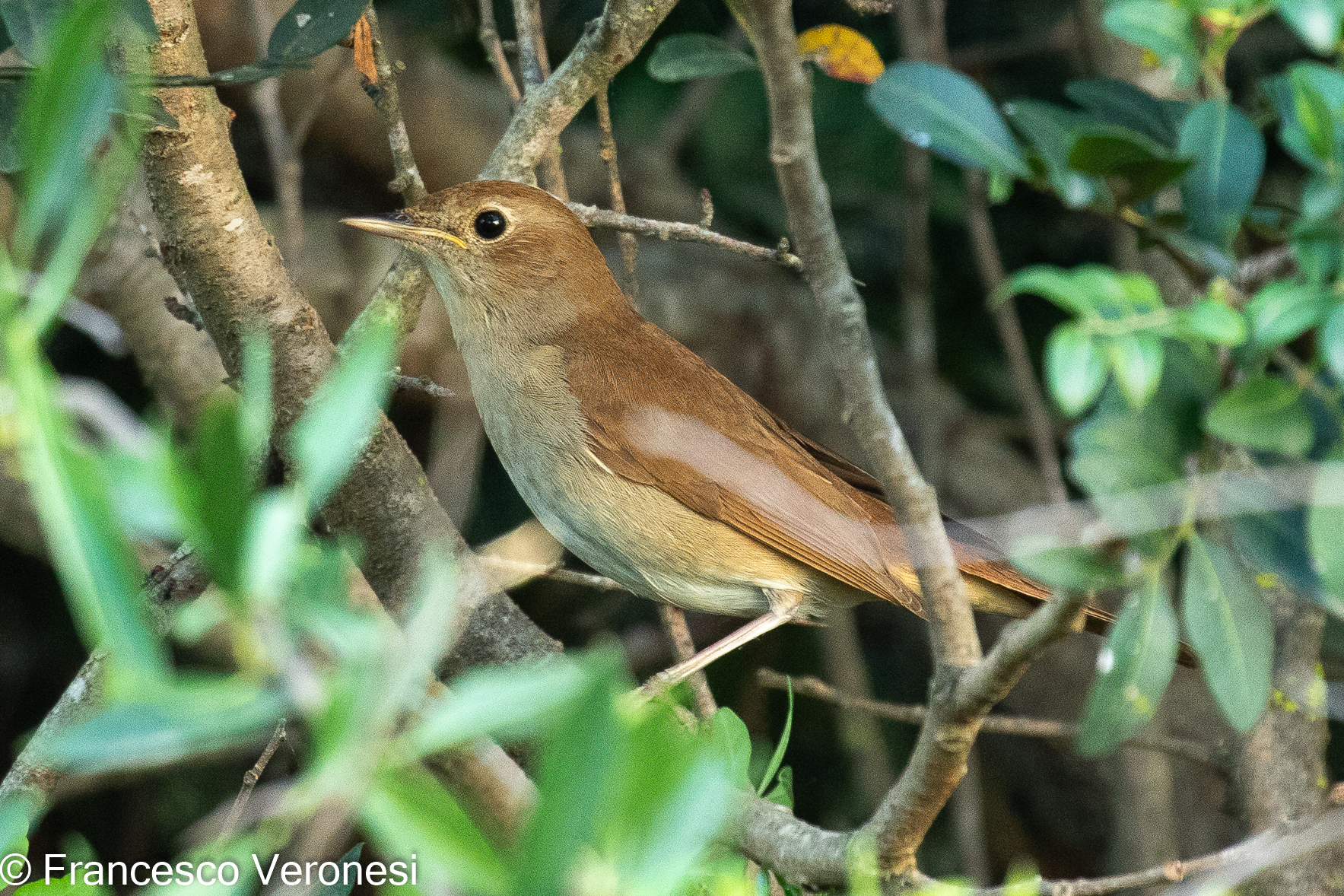
Common nightingale, San Teodoro, Sardinia

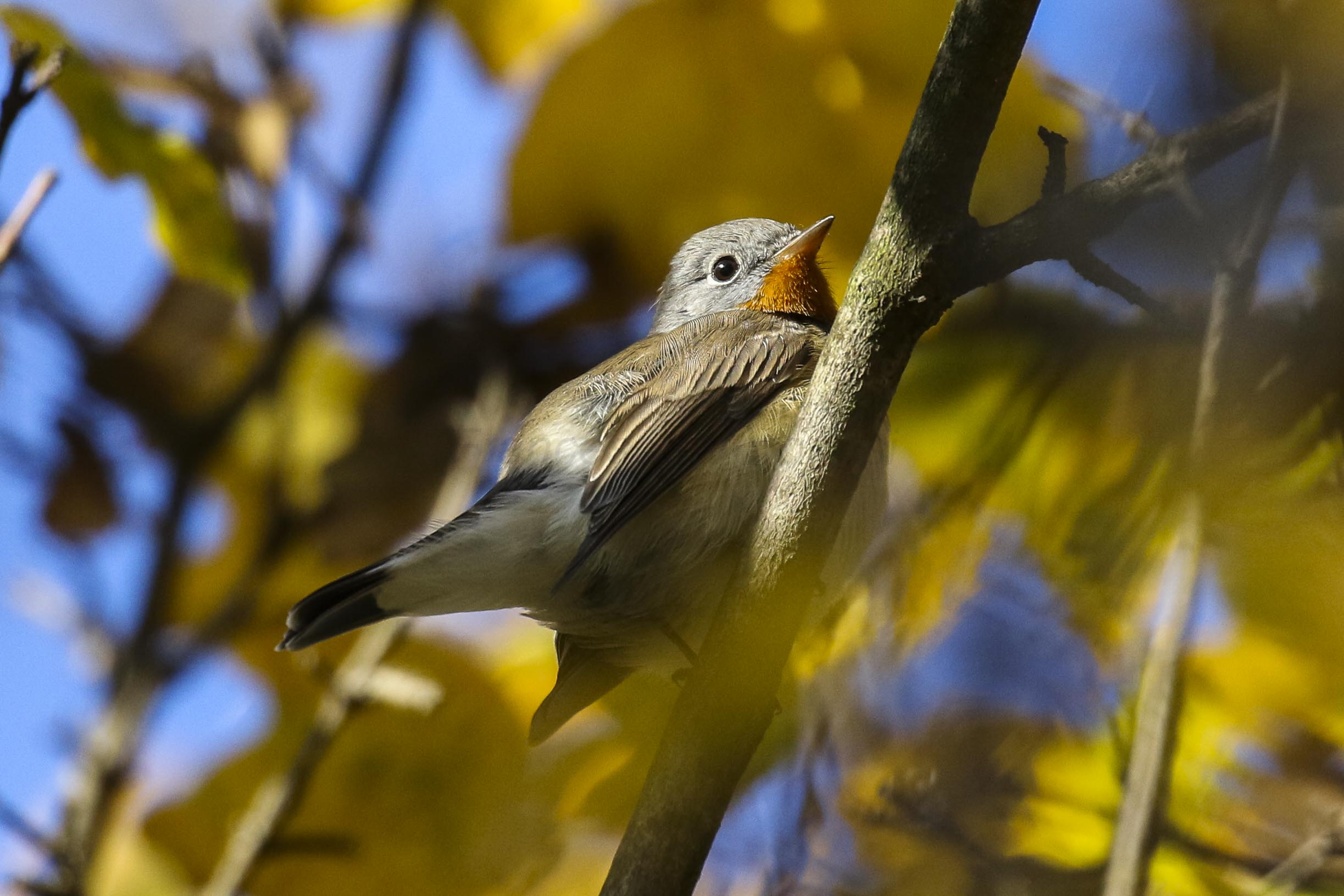
Red-breasted flycatcher, Veneto

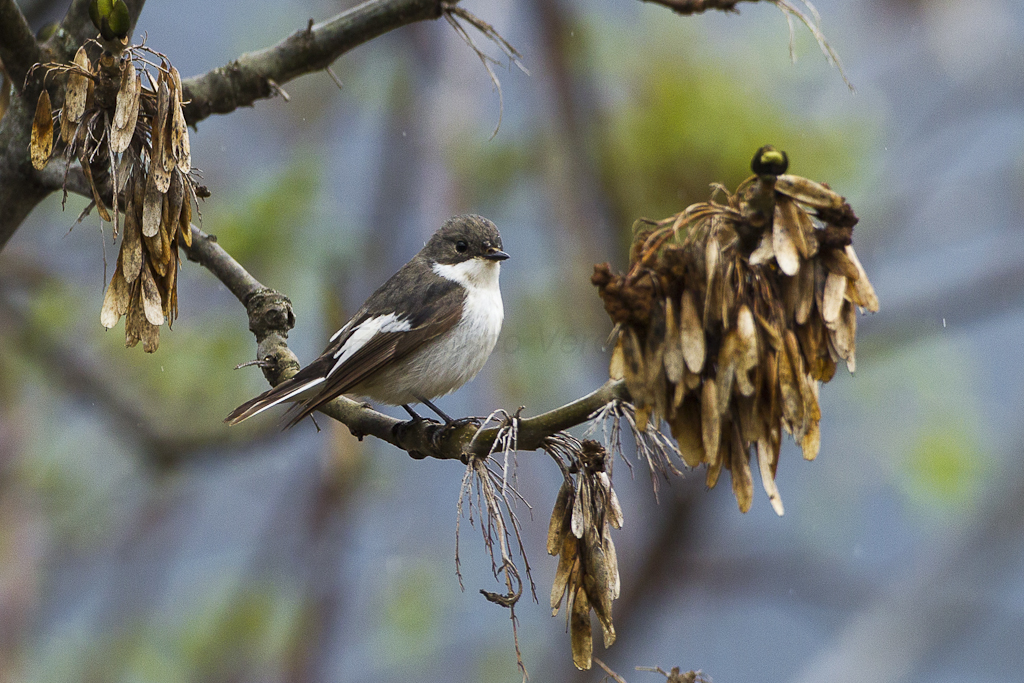
European pied flycatcher, Aosta Valley

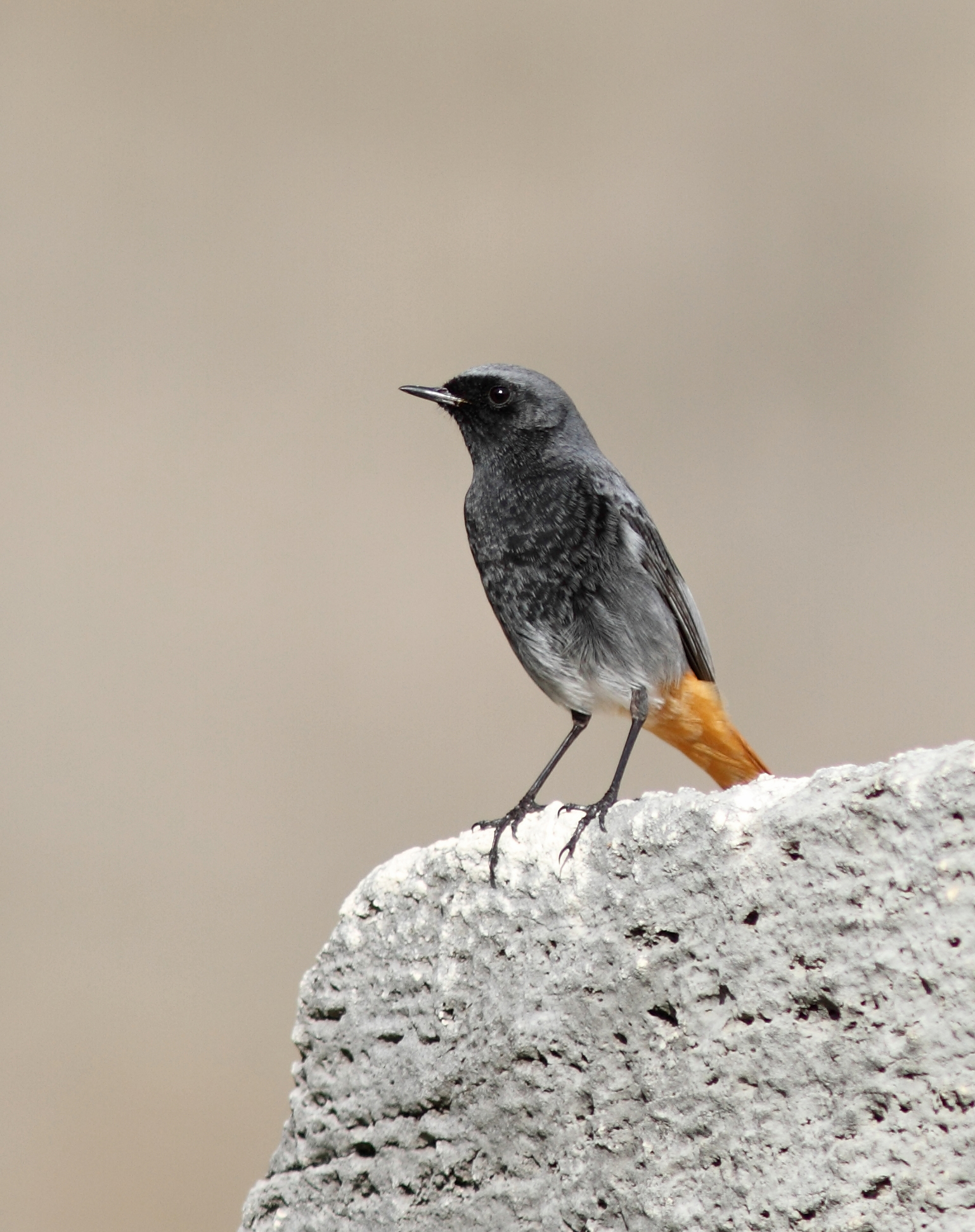
Black redstart, Roman Forum, Rome

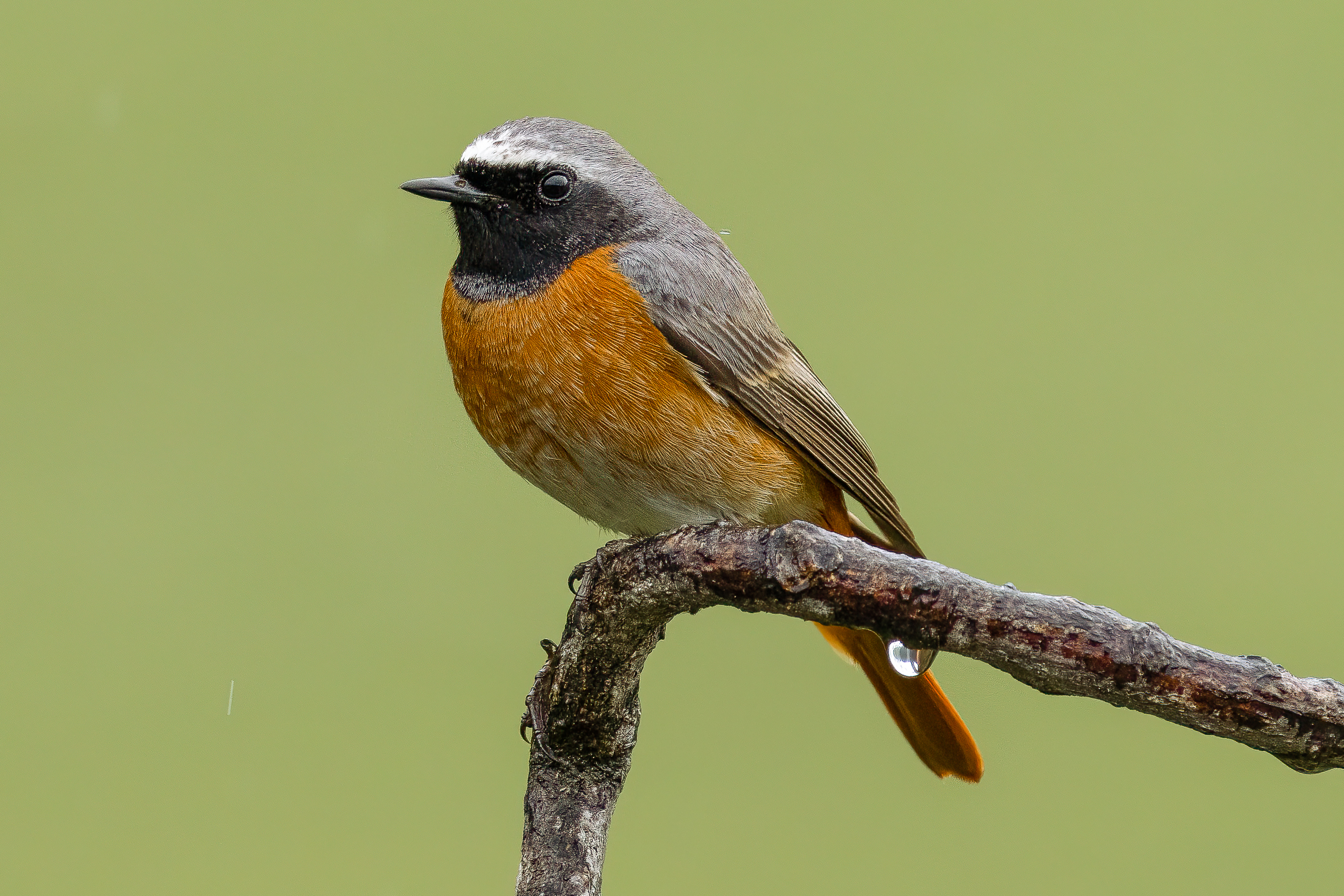
Common redstart, Malga Natura, Veneto

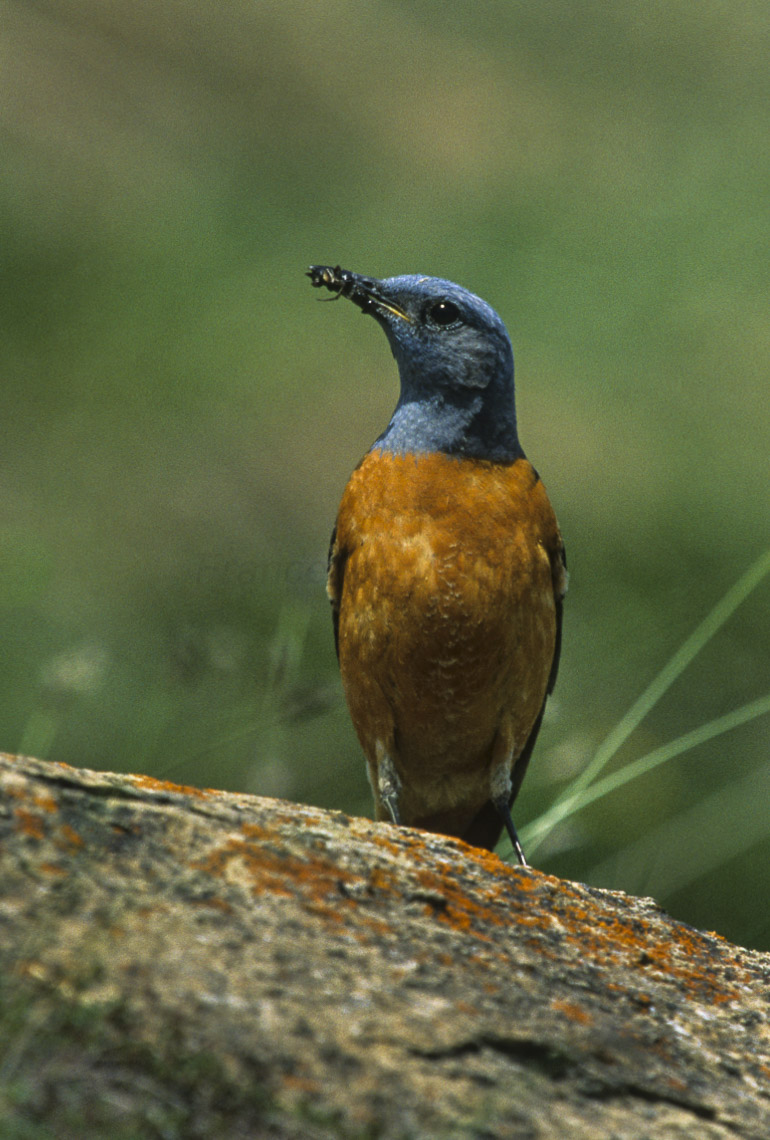
Rufous-tailed rock thrush, Aosta Valley

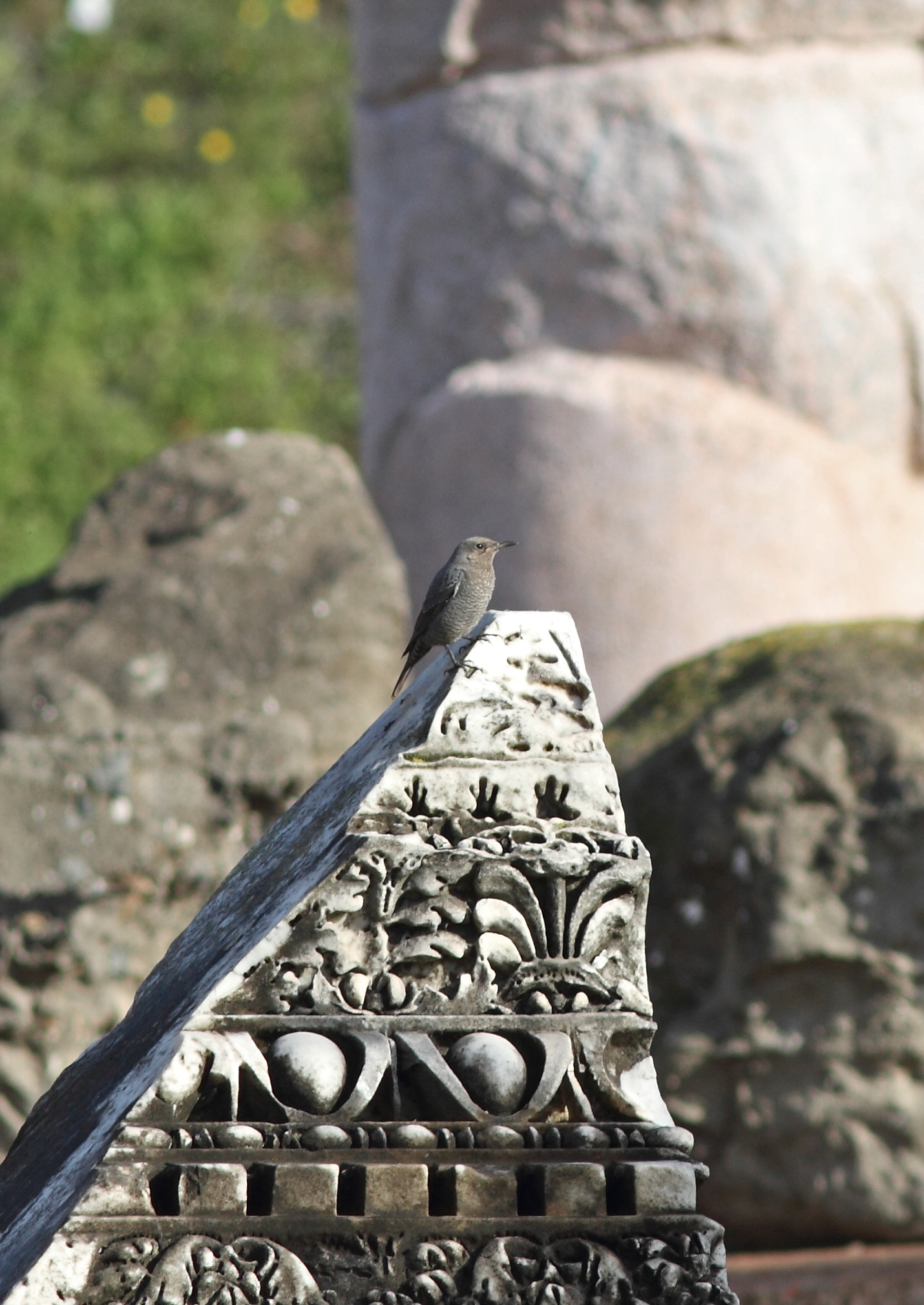
Blue rock thrush, Roman Forum, Rome

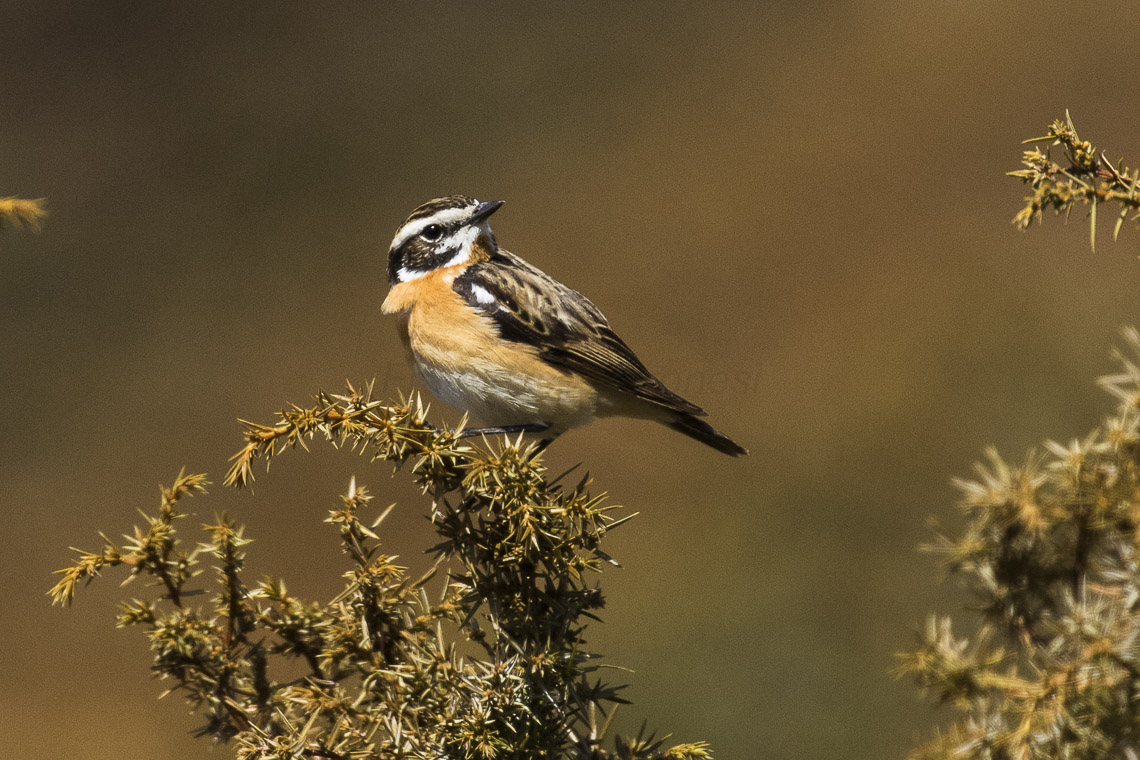
Whinchat, Aosta Valley

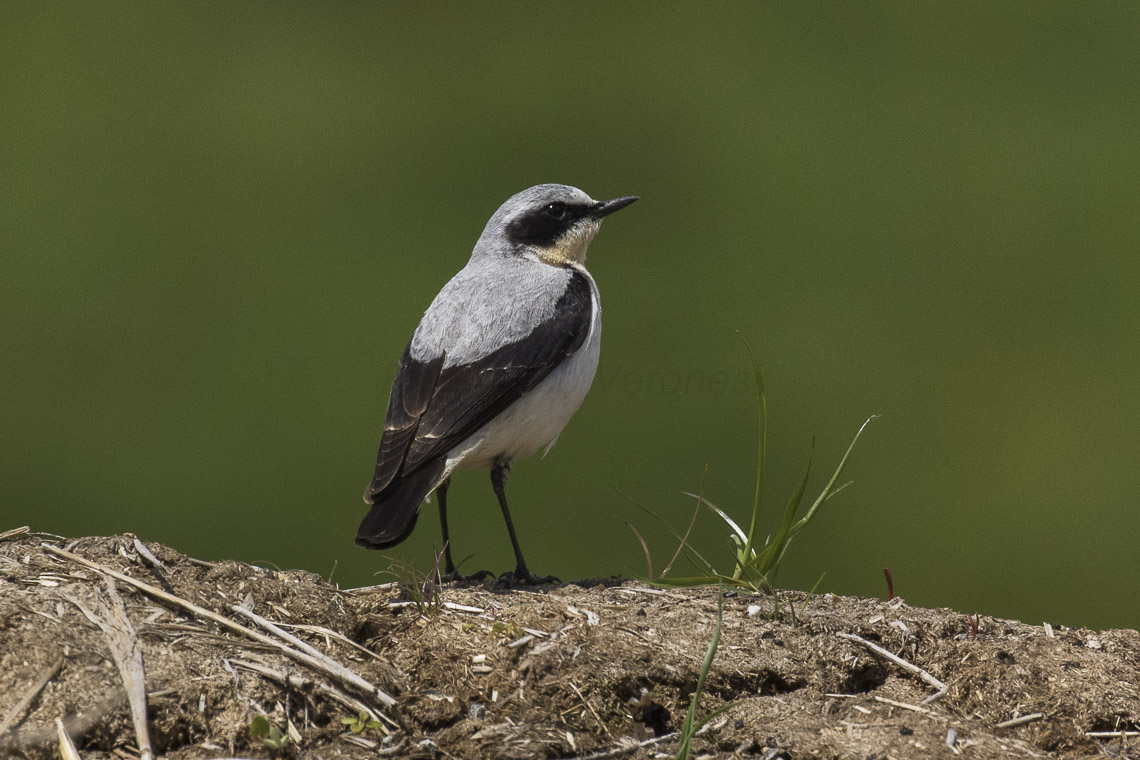
Northern wheatear, Aosta Valley

== Crests and kinglets ==
Order: Passeriformes Family: Regulidae

The crests, also called kinglets, are a small group of birds formerly included in the Old World warblers, but now given family status as they are not related genetically.

- Goldcrest Regulus regulus Regolo – A
- Common firecrest Regulus ignicapilla Fiorrancino – A
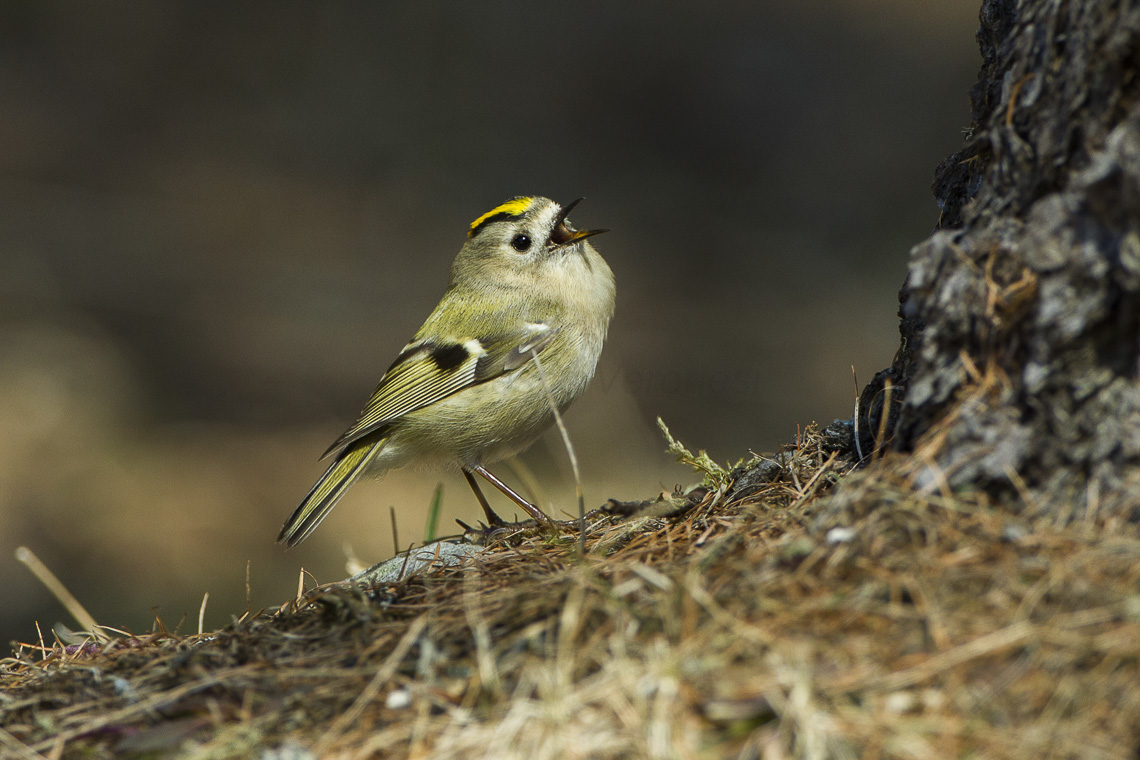
Goldcrest, Aosta Valley

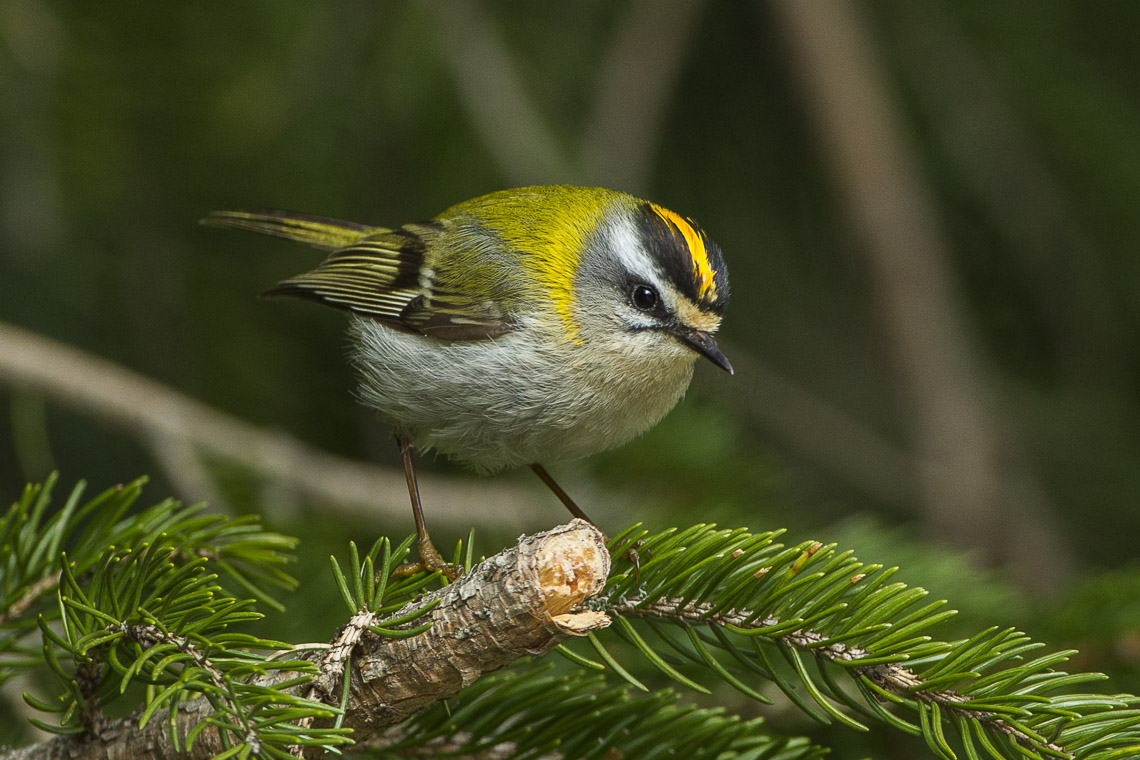
Common firecrest, Apennine Mountains

== Waxwings ==
Order: Passeriformes Family: Bombycillidae

The waxwings are a group of birds with soft silky plumage and unique red tips to some of the wing feathers. In the Bohemian and cedar waxwings, these tips look like sealing wax and give the group its name. These are arboreal birds of northern forests. They live on insects in summer and berries in winter.

- Bohemian waxwing Bombycilla garrulus Beccofrusone – A
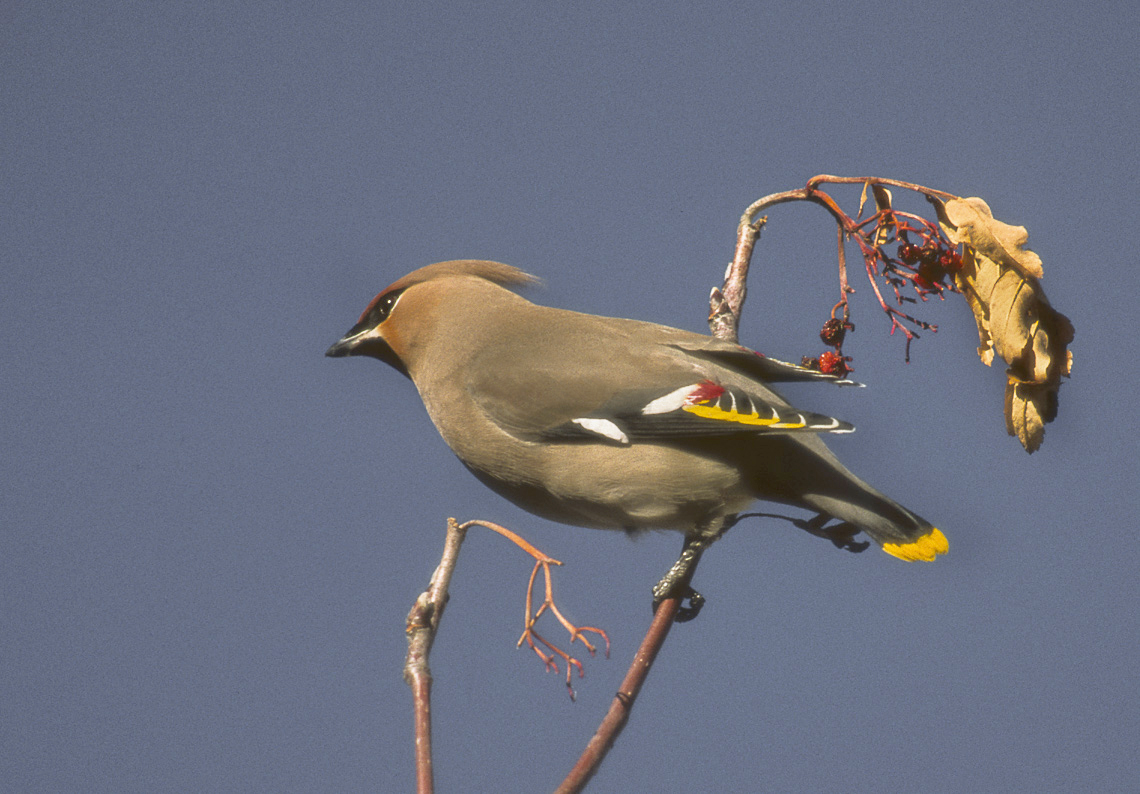
Bohemian waxwing, Aosta Valley

== Accentors ==
Order: Passeriformes Family: Prunellidae

The accentors or dunnocks are the only bird family which is completely endemic to the Palearctic. They are small, fairly drab species superficially similar to sparrows but with slender bills.

- Alpine accentor Prunella collaris Sordone – A
- Siberian accentor Prunella montanella Passera scopaiola asiatica – B
- Dunnock Prunella modularis Passera scopaiola – A
- Black-throated accentor Prunella atrogularis Passera scopaiola golanera – A
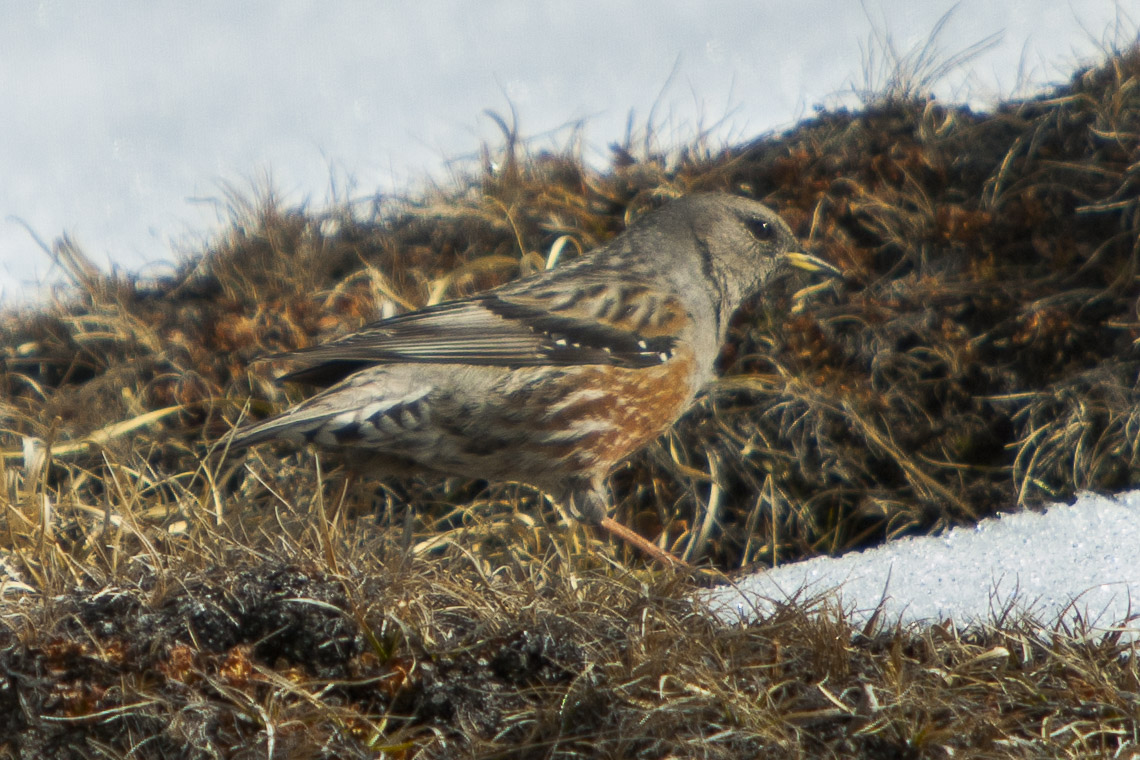
Alpine accentor, Stelvio National Park

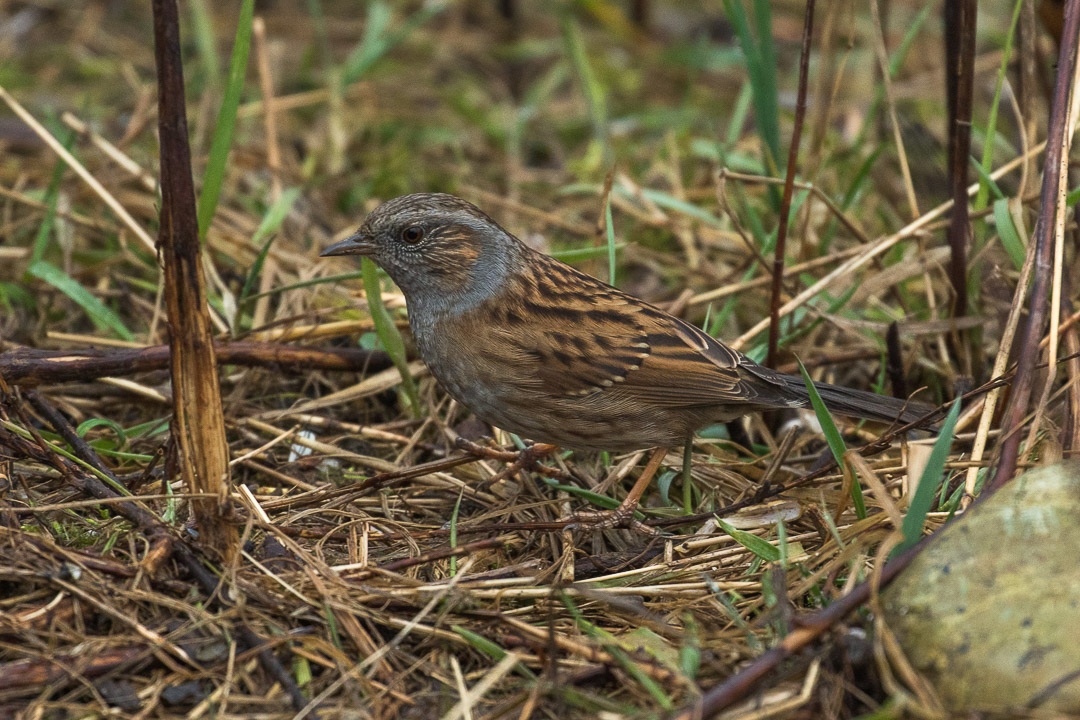
Dunnock, Agrate Brianza

== Waxbills and allies ==
Order: Passeriformes Family: Estrildidae

The estrildid finches are small passerine birds of the Old World tropics and Australasia. They are gregarious and often colonial seed eaters with short thick but pointed bills. They are all similar in structure and habits, but have wide variation in plumage colour and patterns. Many are popular cagebirds, and it is escapes from this source from which the single species in Italy derives.

- Red avadavat Amandava amandava Bengalino comune – C

== Old World sparrows ==
Order: Passeriformes Family: Passeridae

Old World sparrows are small passerine birds. In general, sparrows tend to be small, plump, brown or grey birds with short tails and short powerful beaks. Sparrows are seed eaters, but they also consume small insects.

- House sparrow Passer domesticus Passera oltremontana – A
- Italian sparrow Passer italiae Passera d'Italia – A
- Spanish sparrow Passer hispaniolensis Passera sarda – A
- Eurasian tree sparrow Passer montanus Passera mattugia – A
- Rock sparrow Petronia petronia Passera lagia – A
- White-winged snowfinch Montifringilla nivalis Fringuello – A
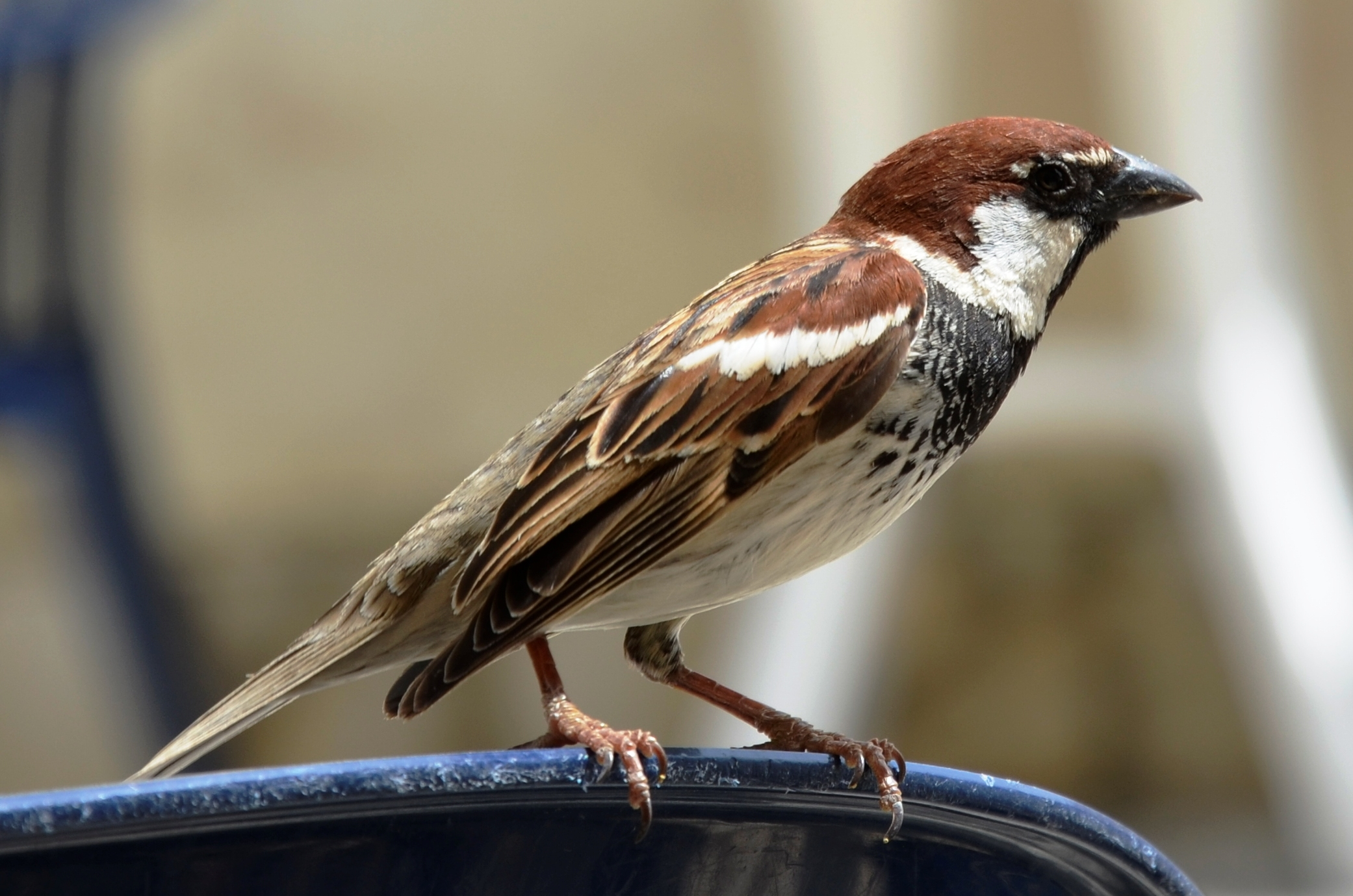
Italian sparrow, Florence

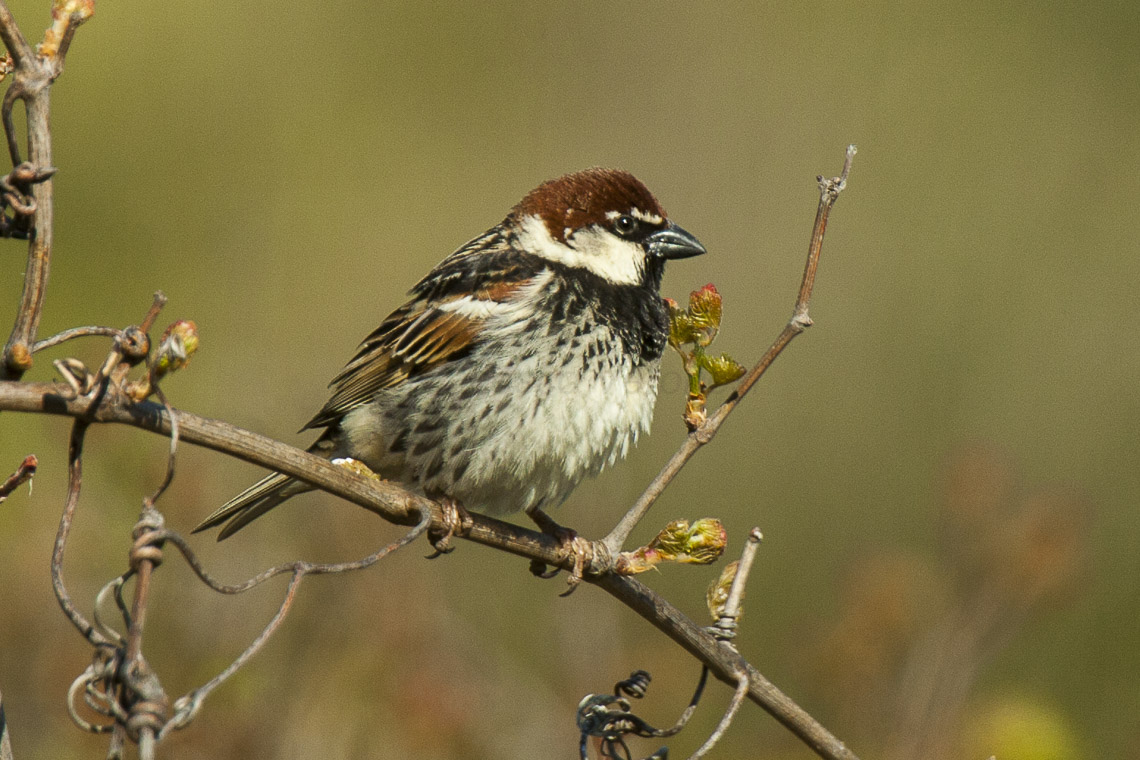
Spanish sparrow, Pantelleria

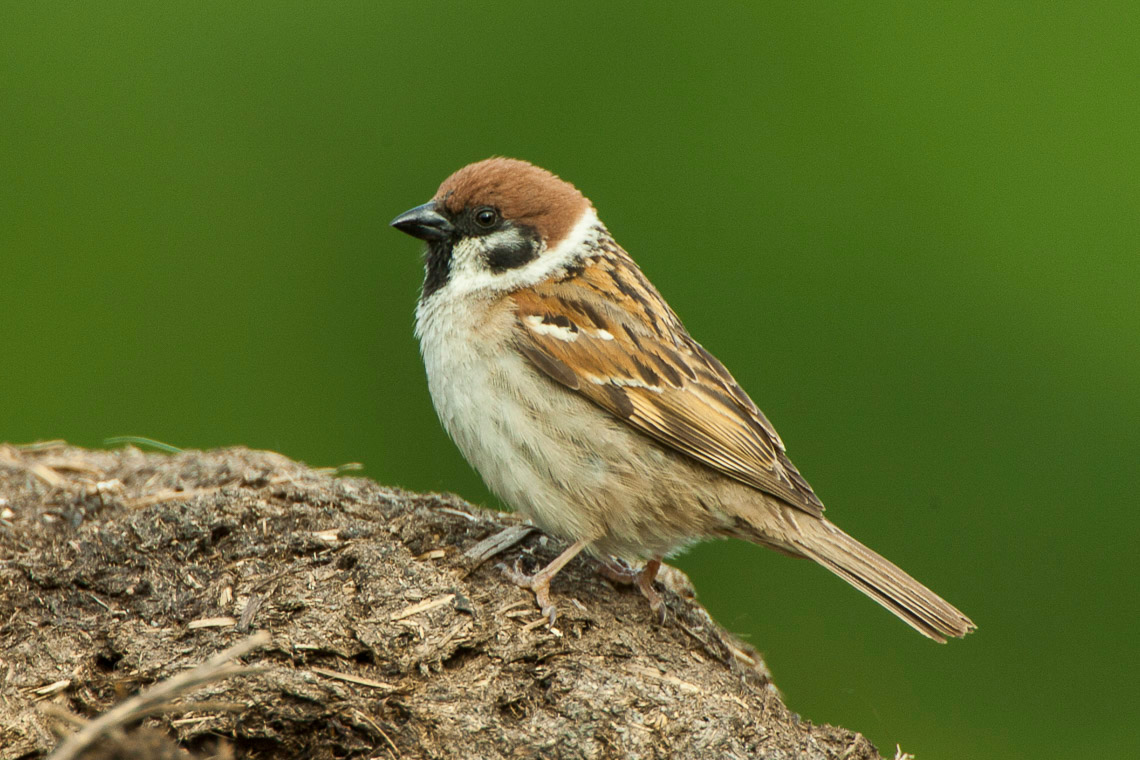
Eurasian tree sparrow, La Salle, Aosta Valley

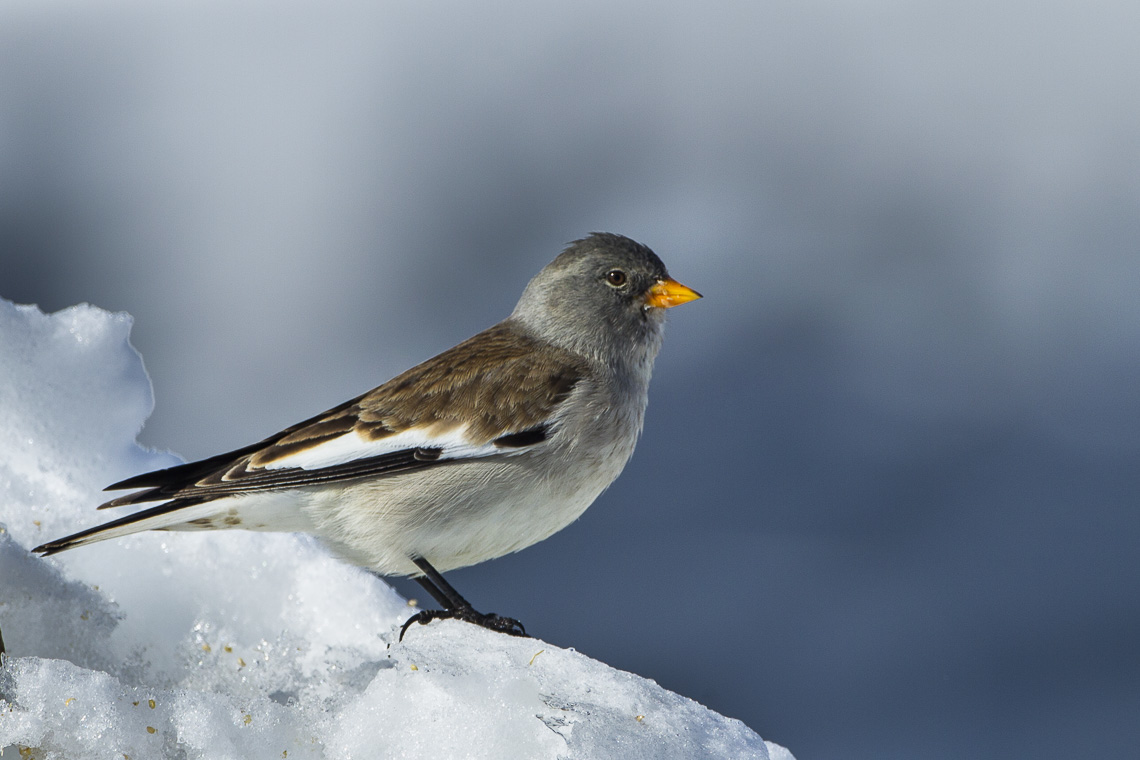
White-winged snowfinch, Lessinia, Veneto

== Wagtails and pipits ==
Order: Passeriformes Family: Motacillidae

Motacillidae is a family of small passerine birds with medium to long tails. They include the wagtails and pipits. They are slender, ground feeding insectivores of open country.

- Tree pipit Anthus trivialis Prispolone – A
- Olive-backed pipit Anthus hodgsoni Prispolone indiano – A
- Red-throated pipit Anthus cervinus Pispola golarossa – A
- Buff-bellied pipit Anthus rubescens Spioncello del Pacifico – A
- Meadow pipit Anthus pratensis Pispola – A
- Water pipit Anthus spinoletta Spioncello – A
- European rock pipit Anthus petrosus Spioncello marino – A
- Richard's pipit Anthus richardi Calandro maggiore – A
- Blyth's pipit Anthus godlewskii Calandro di Blyth – A
- Tawny pipit Anthus campestris Calandro – A
- Western yellow wagtail Motacilla flava Cutrettola – A
- Grey wagtail Motacilla cinerea Ballerina gialla – A
- Citrine wagtail Motacilla citreola Cutrettola testagialla – A
- White wagtail Motacilla alba Ballerina bianca – A
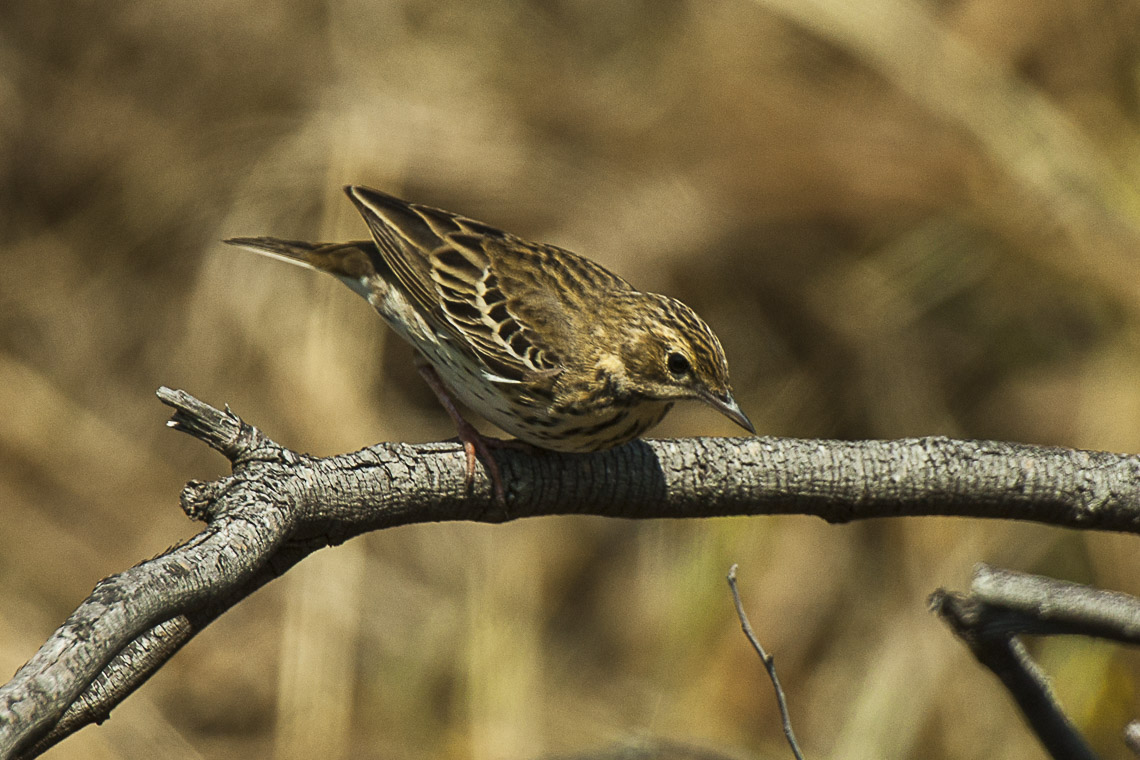
Tree pipit, Pantelleria

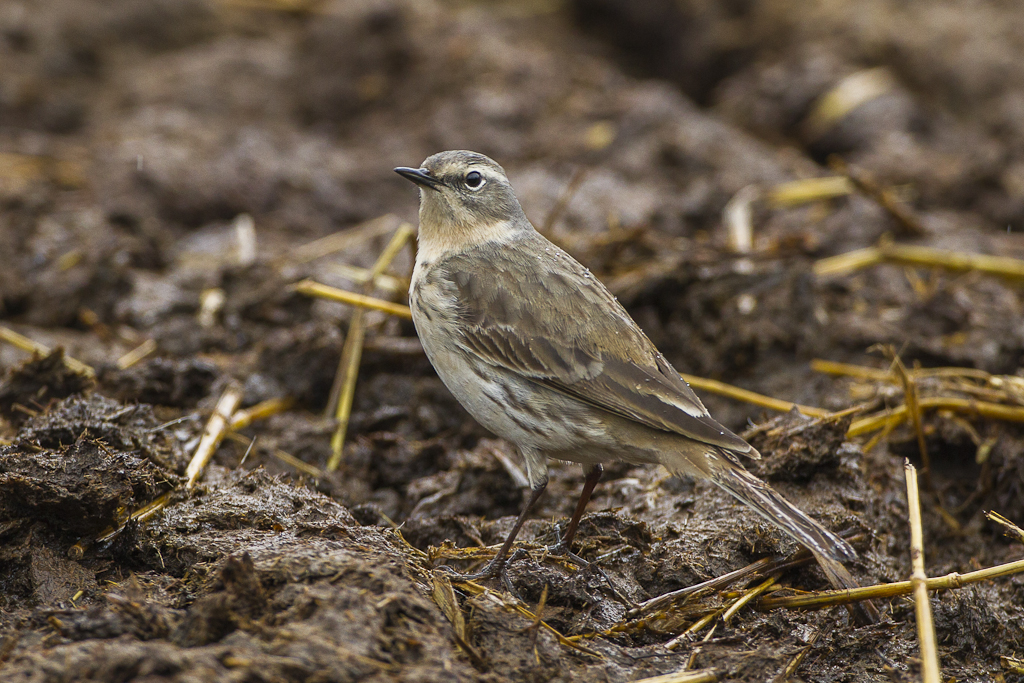
Water pipit, Aosta Valley

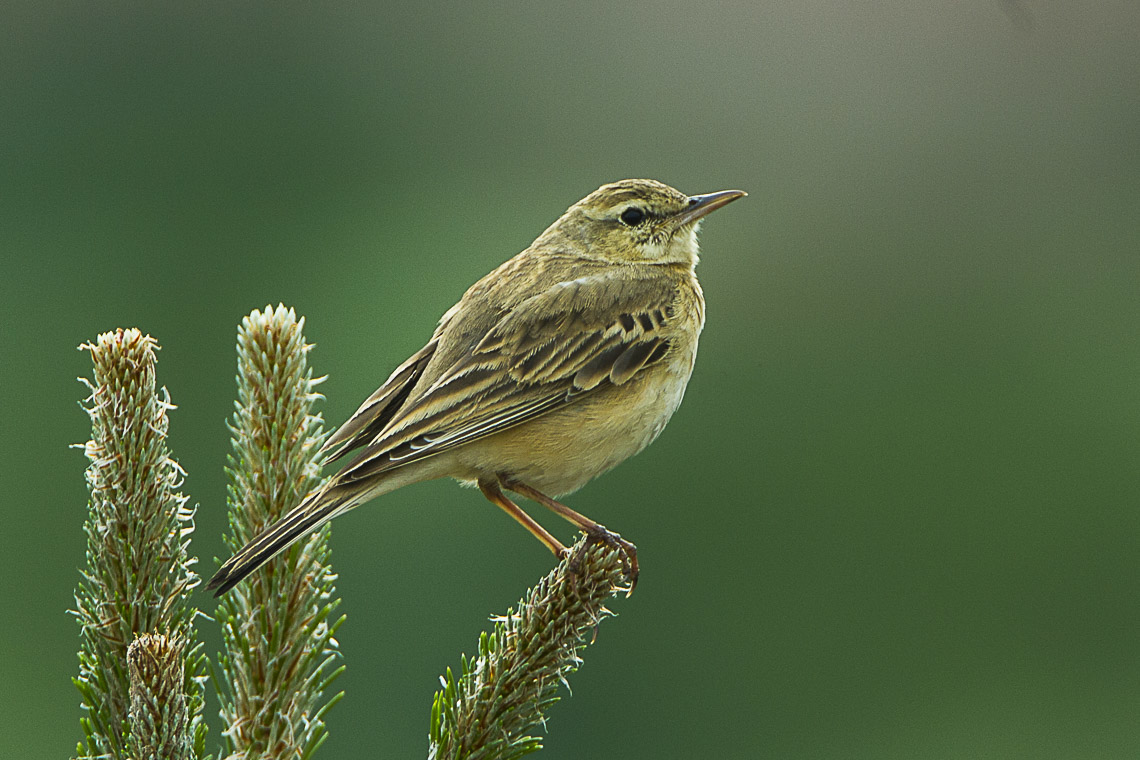
Tawny pipit, Karst Plateau

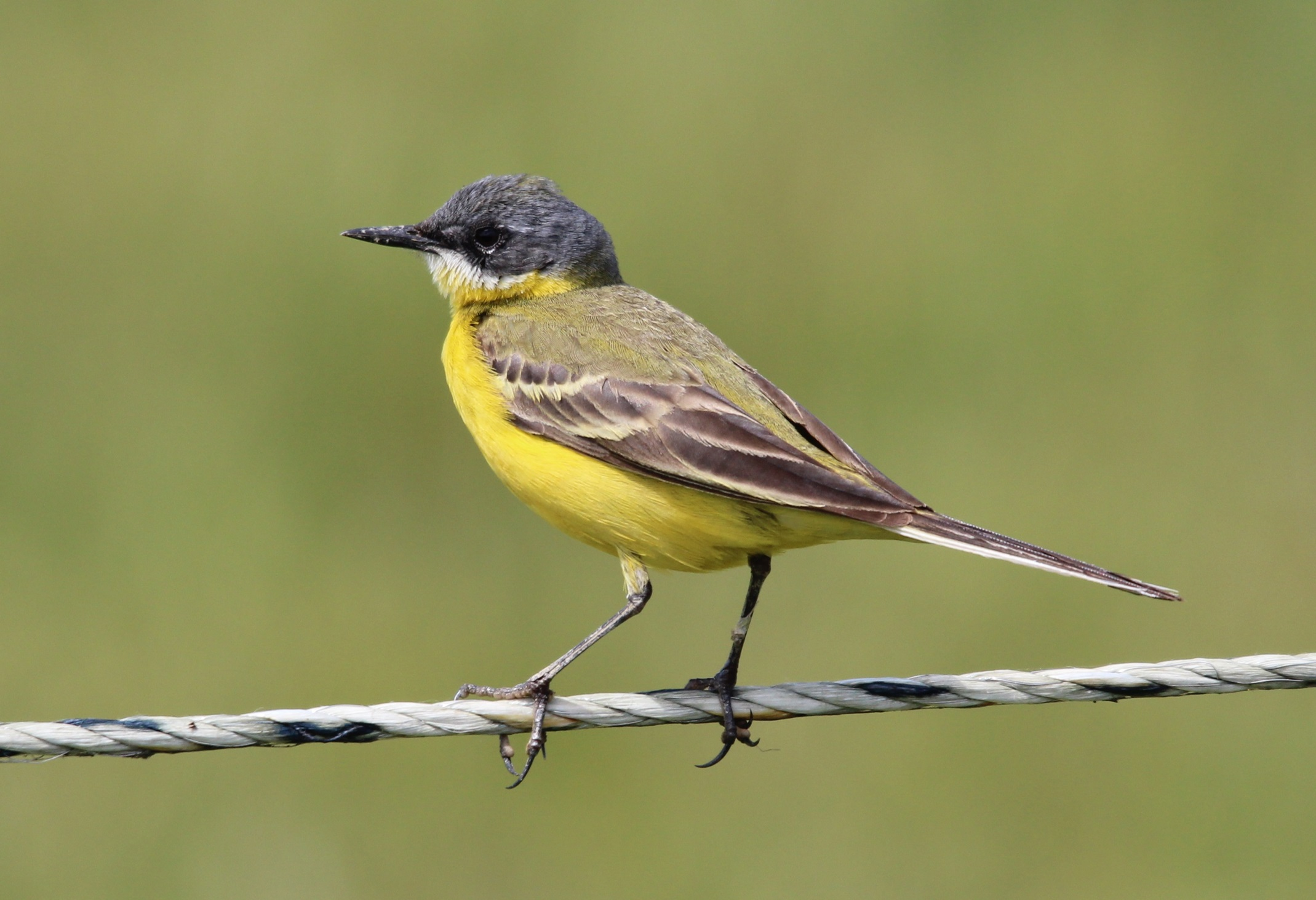
Western yellow wagtail (subspecies Motacilla flava cinereocapilla), Nomadelfia

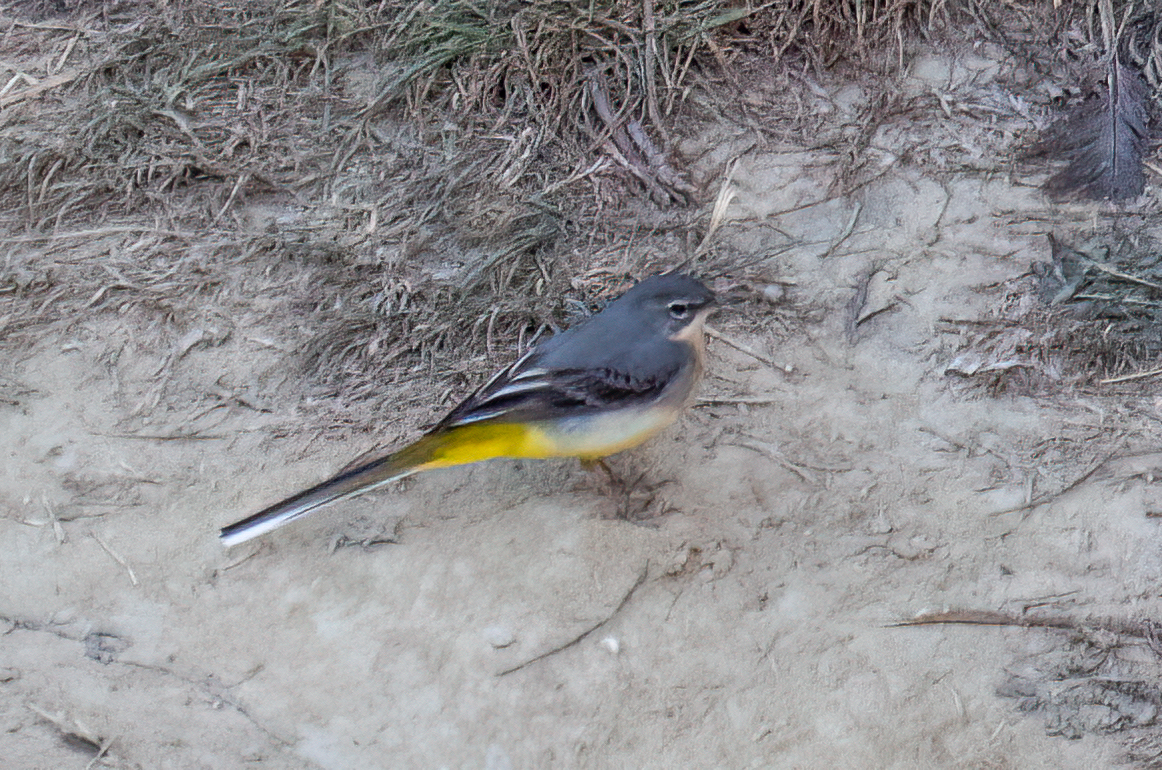
Grey wagtail, Florence

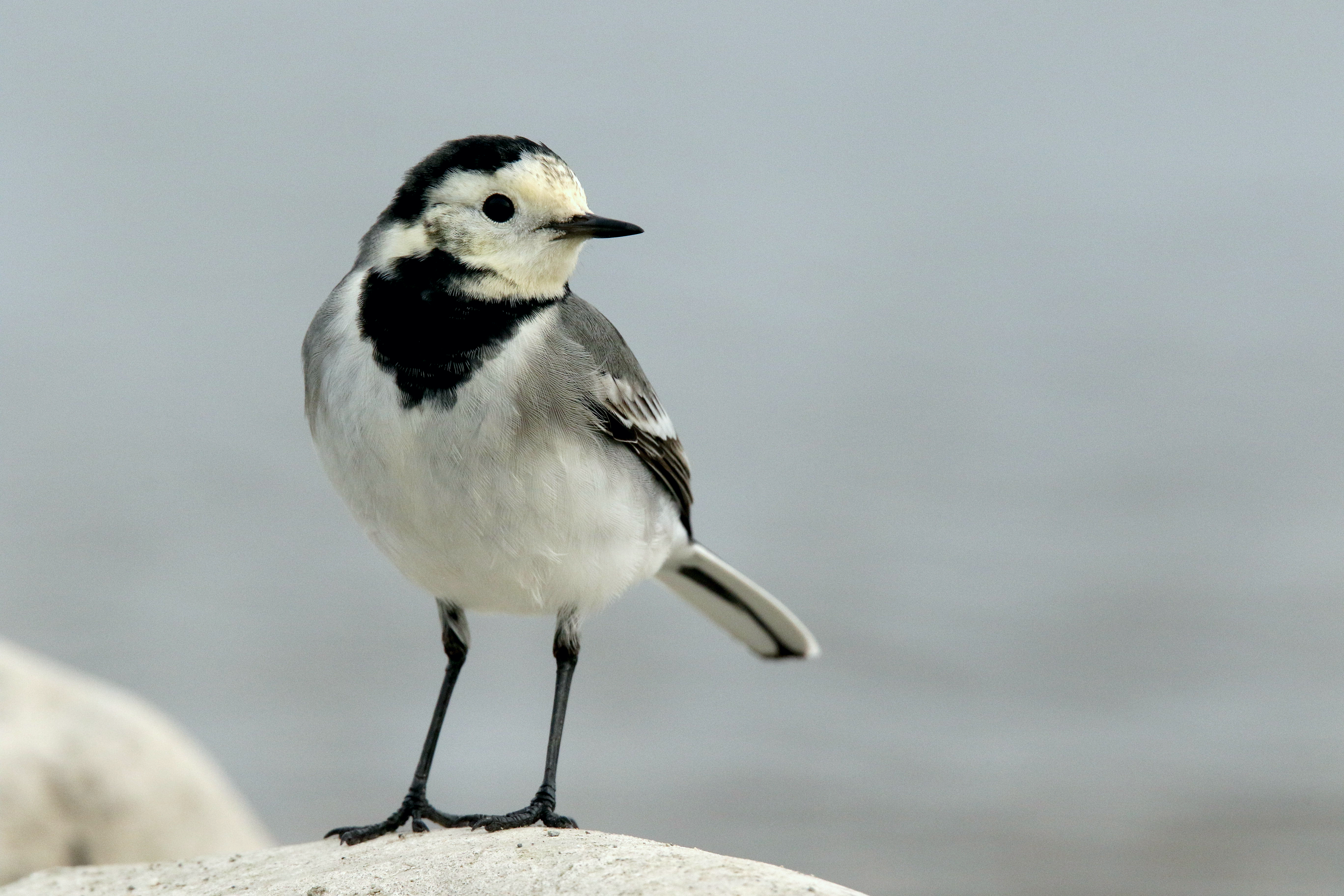
White wagtail, Novi Ligure, Piedmont

== Finches and allies ==
Order: Passeriformes Family: Fringillidae

Finches are seed-eating passerine birds, that are small to moderately large and have a strong beak, usually conical and in some species very large. All have twelve tail feathers and nine primaries. These birds have a bouncing flight with alternating bouts of flapping and gliding on closed wings, and most sing well.

- Common chaffinch Fringilla coelebs Fringuello – A
- Brambling Fringilla montifringilla Peppola – A
- Hawfinch Coccothraustes coccothraustes Frosone – A
- Common rosefinch Carpodacus erythrinus Ciuffolotto scarlatto – A
- Pine grosbeak Pinicola enucleator Ciuffolotto delle pinete – A
- Eurasian bullfinch Pyrrhula pyrrhula Ciuffolotto – A
- Trumpeter finch Bucanetes githagineus Trombettiere – A
- European greenfinch Chloris chloris Verdone – A
- Twite Linaria flavirostris Fanello nordico – A
- Common linnet Linaria cannabina Fanello – A
- Redpoll Acanthis flammea Organetto – A
- Parrot crossbill Loxia pytyopsittacus Crociere delle pinete – A
- Red crossbill Loxia curvirostra Crociere – A
- Two-barred crossbill Loxia leucoptera Crociere fasciato – A
- European goldfinch Carduelis carduelis Cardellino – A
- Citril finch Carduelis citrinella Venturone alpino – A
- Corsican finch Carduelis corsicana Venturone corso – A
- European serin Serinus serinus Verzellino – A
- Eurasian siskin Spinus spinus Lucherino – A
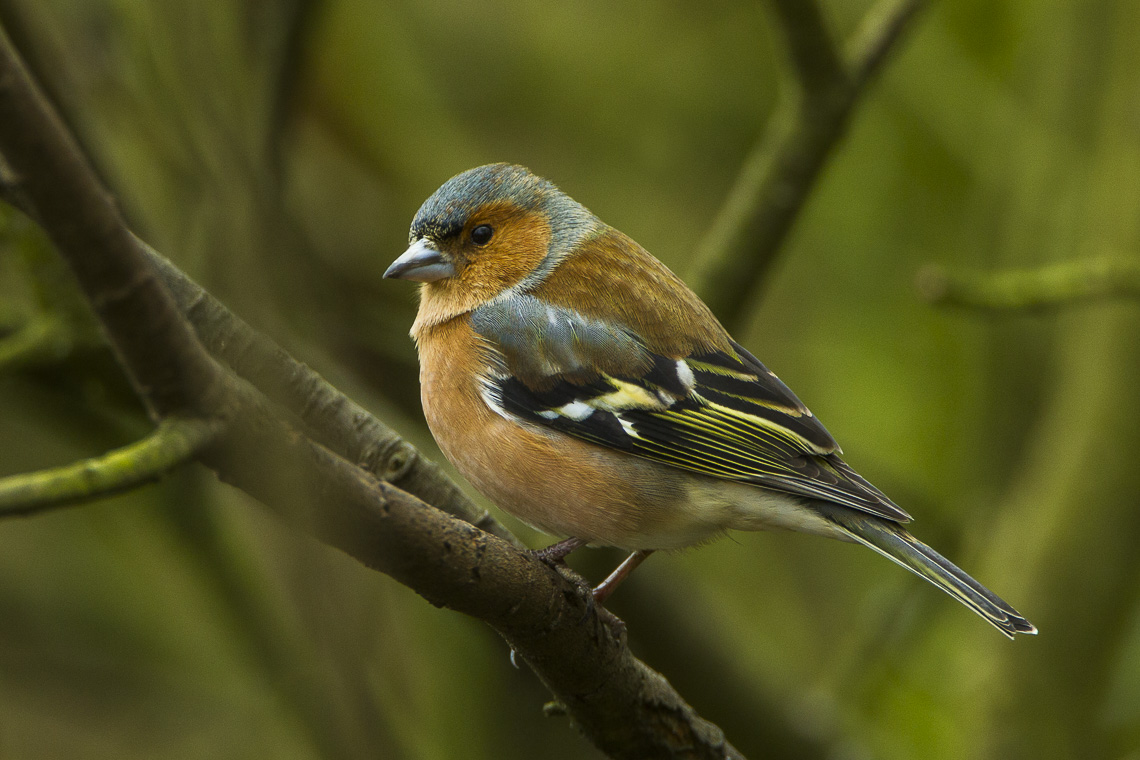
Common chaffinch, Italy

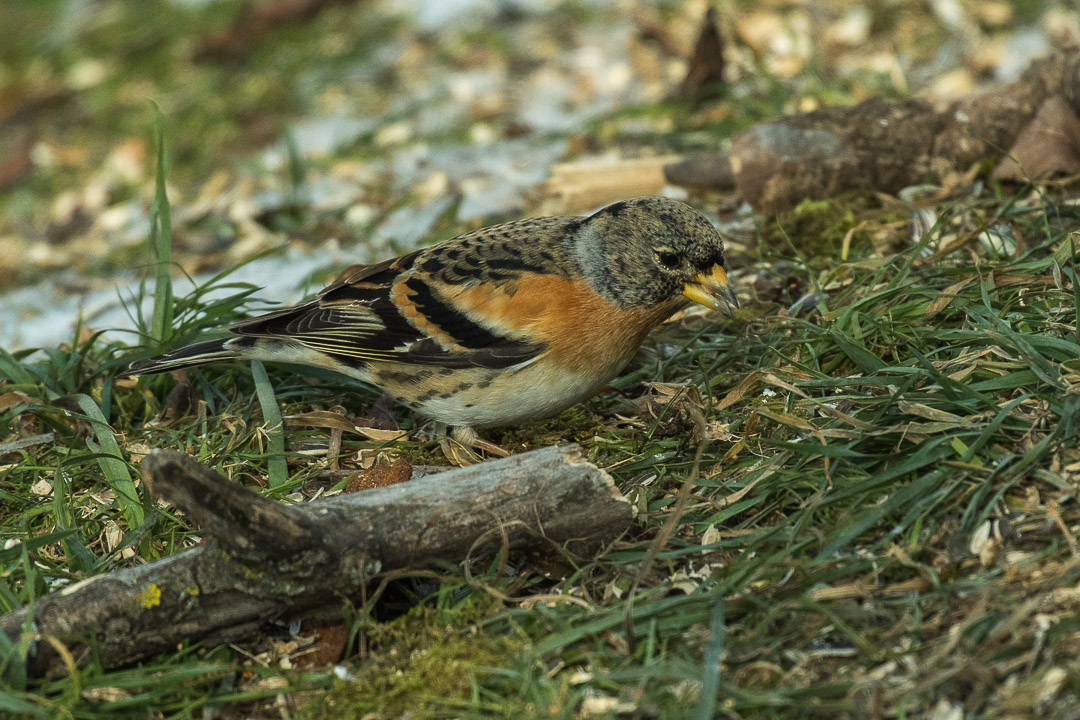
Brambling, Montevecchia, Lombardy

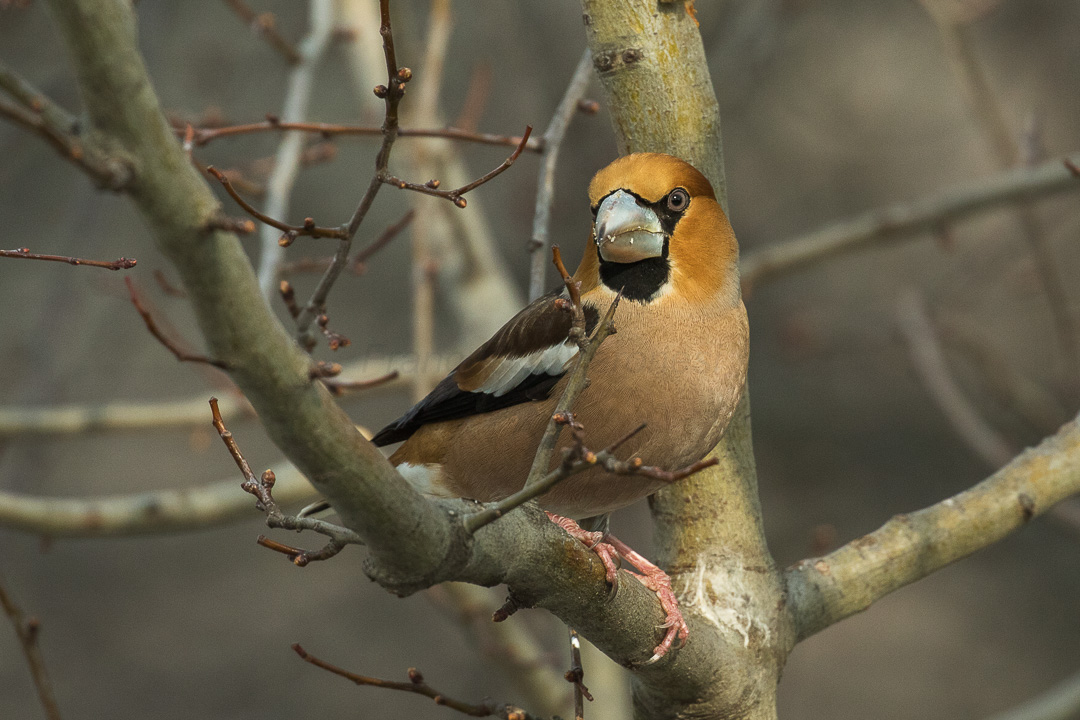
Hawfinch, Montevecchia, Lombardy

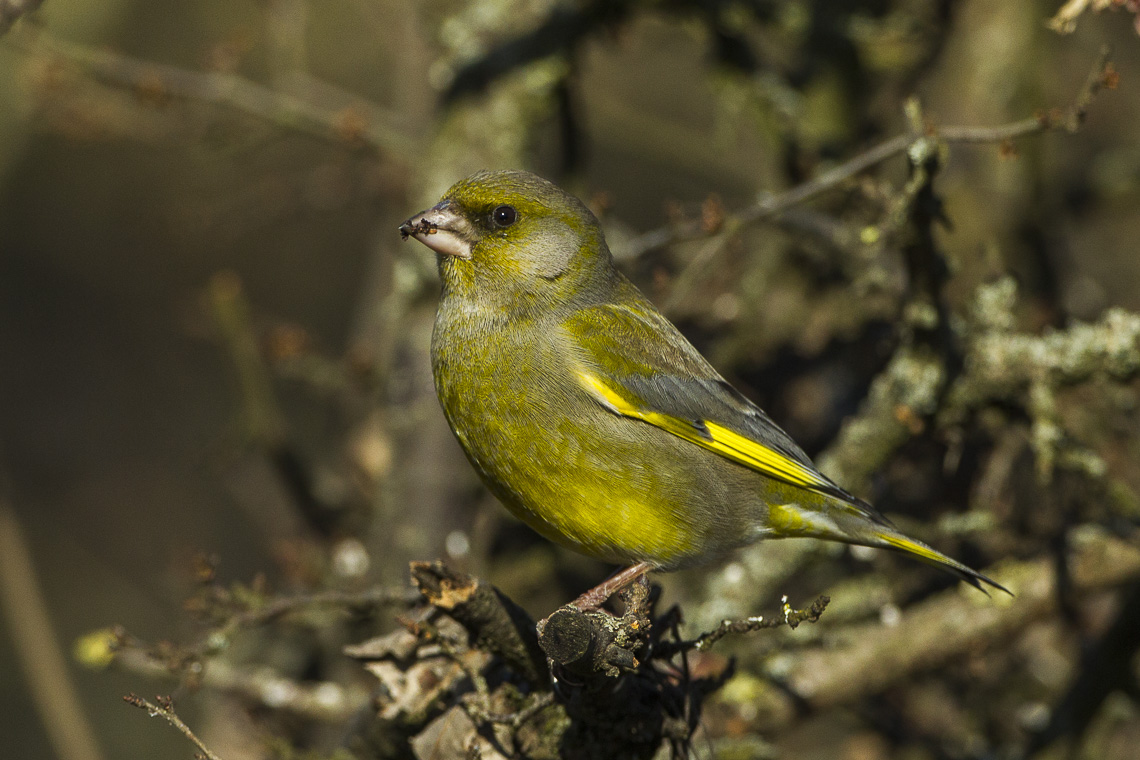
European greenfinch, Italy

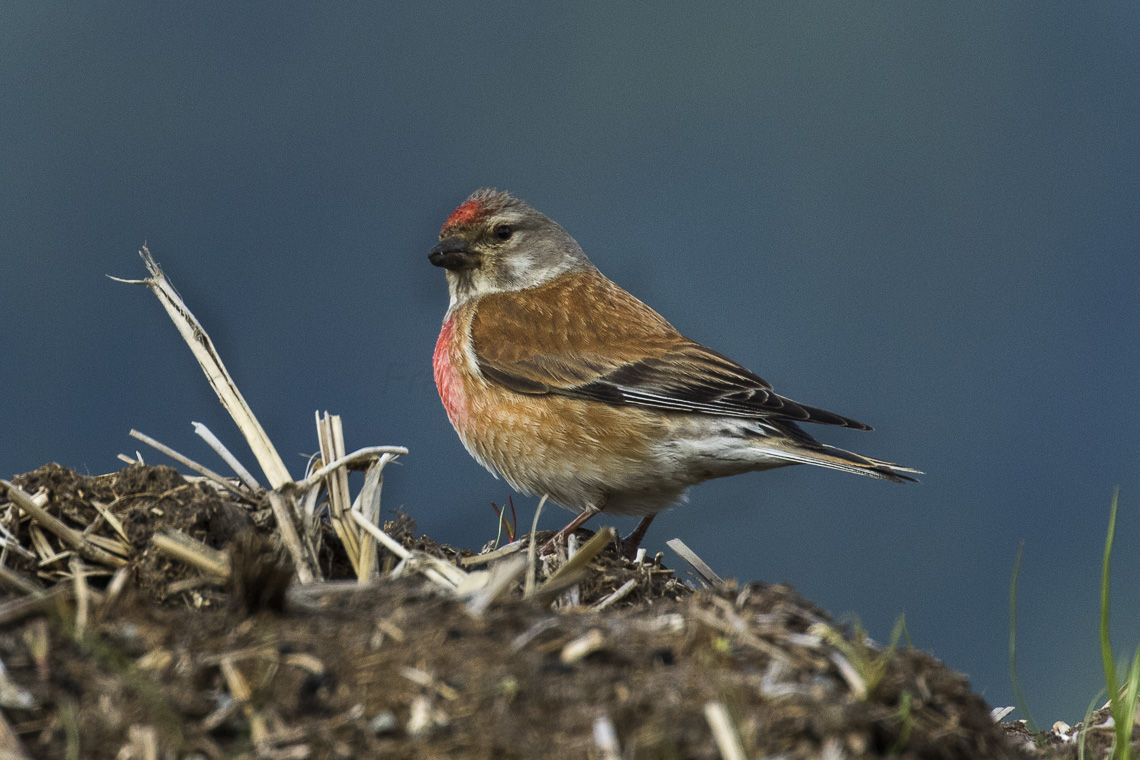
Eurasian linnet, Aosta Valley

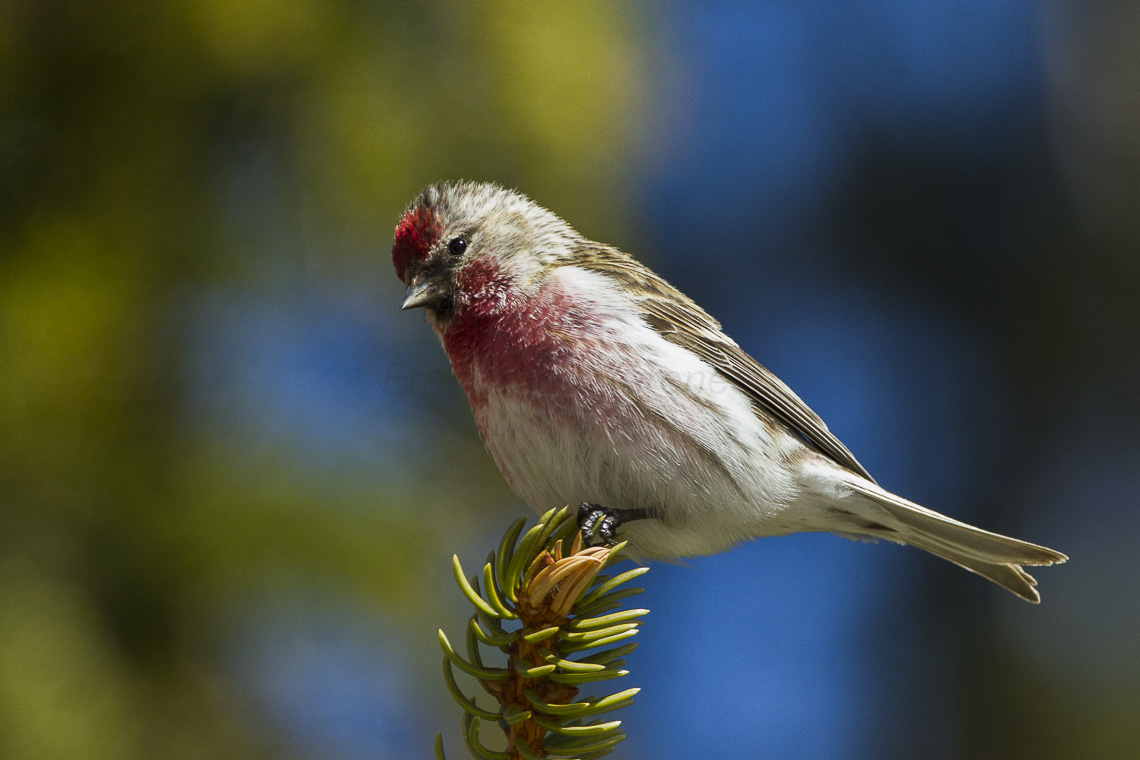
Redpoll, Aosta Valley

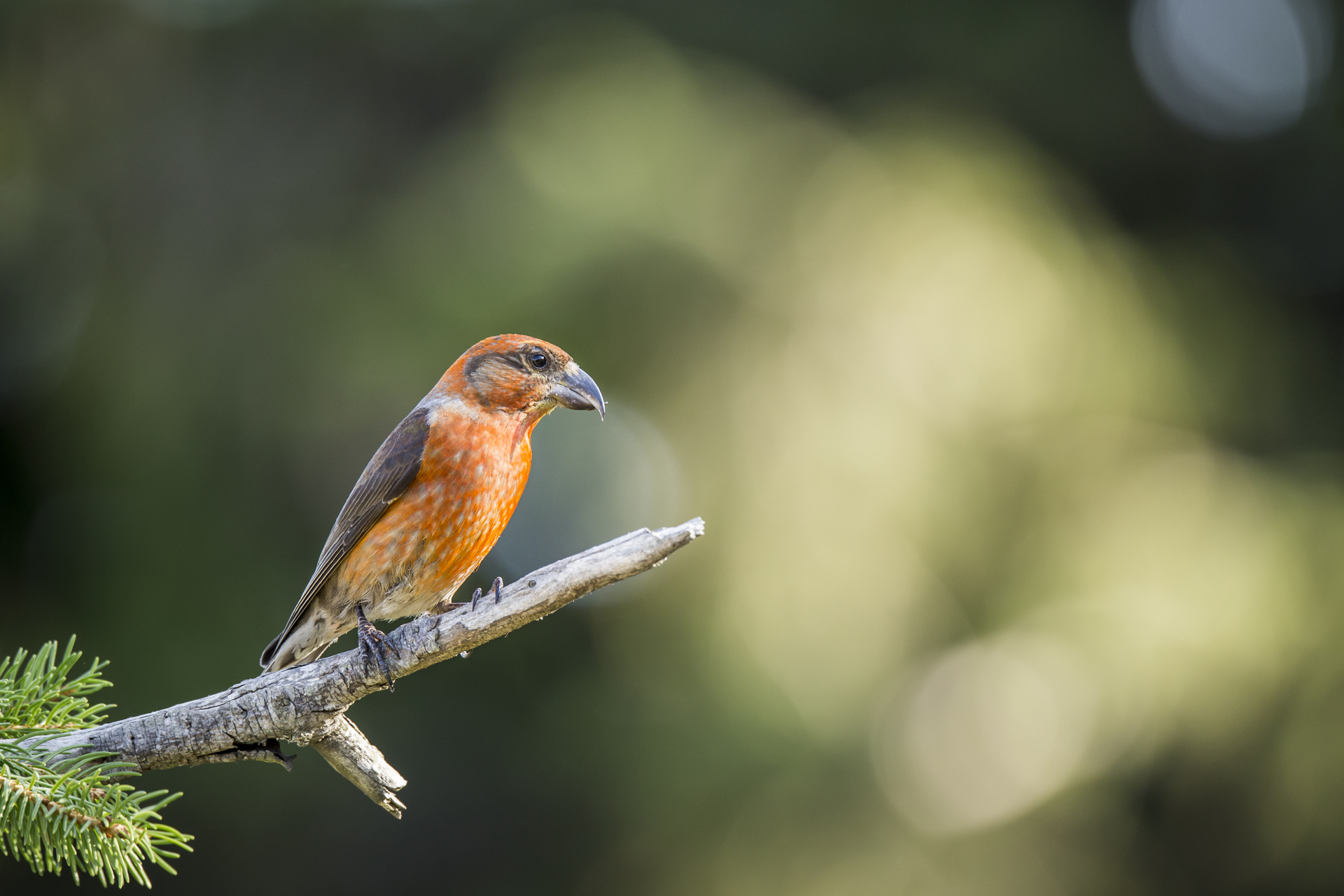
Red crossbill, Province of Verona

European goldfinch, Trentino

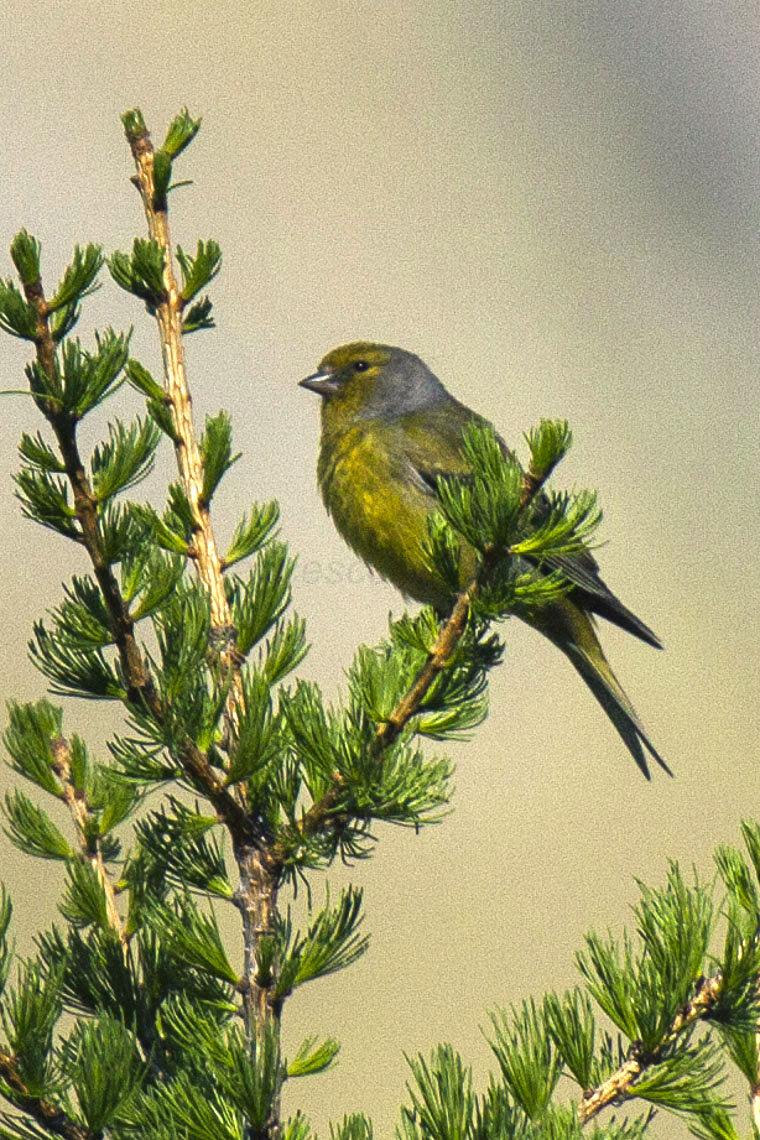
Citril finch, Aosta Valley

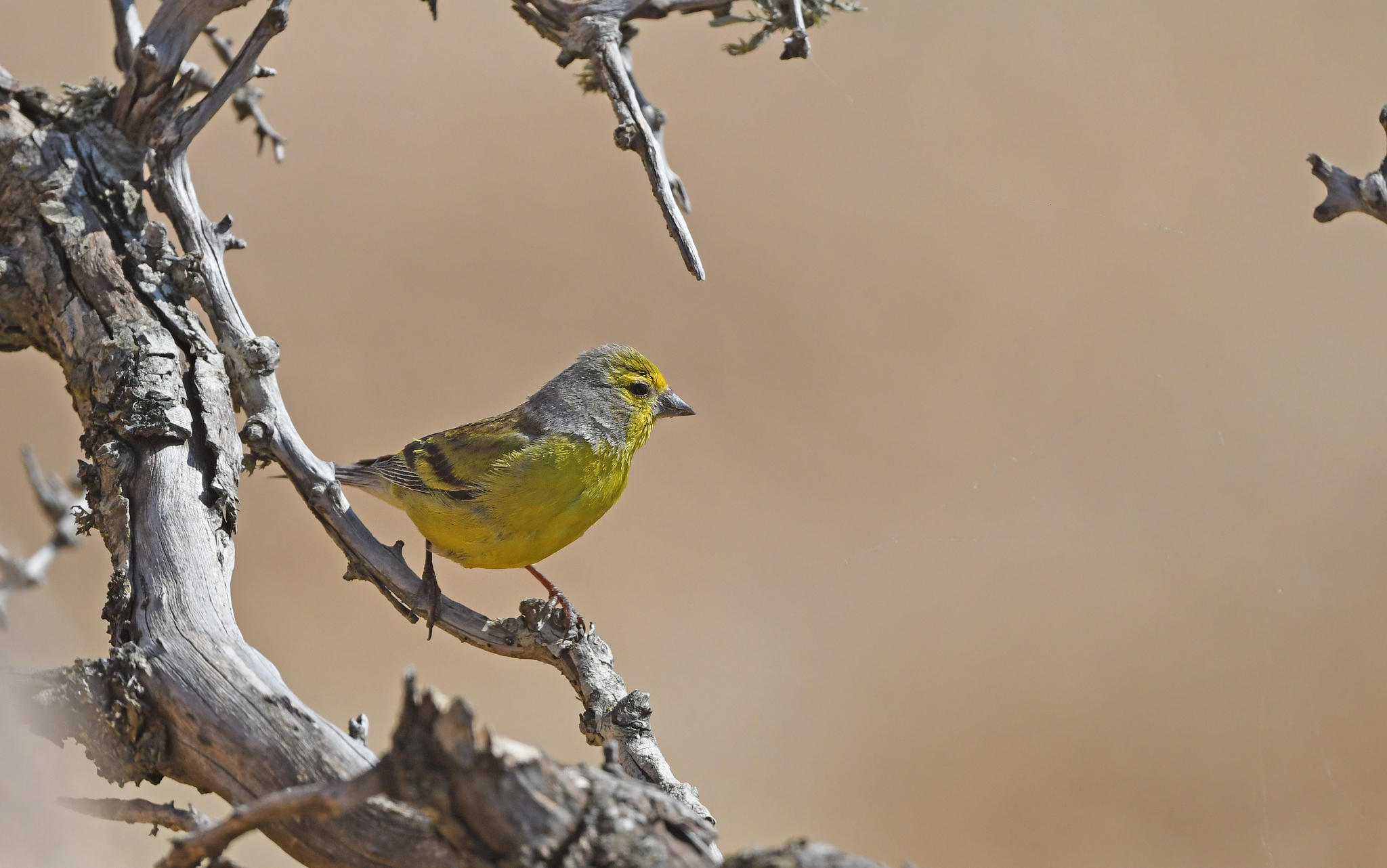
Corsican finch, Sardinia

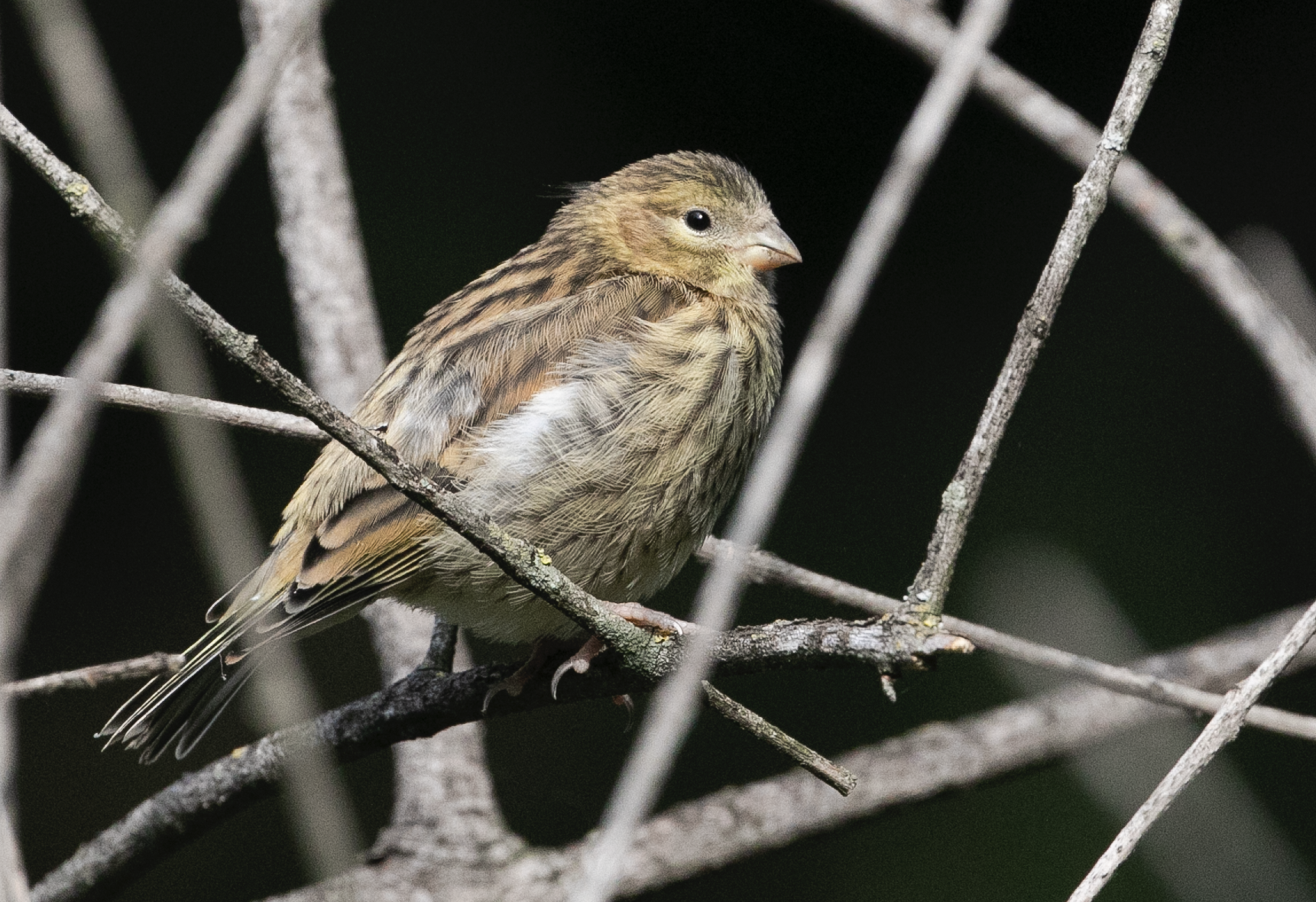
European serin, Sirmione

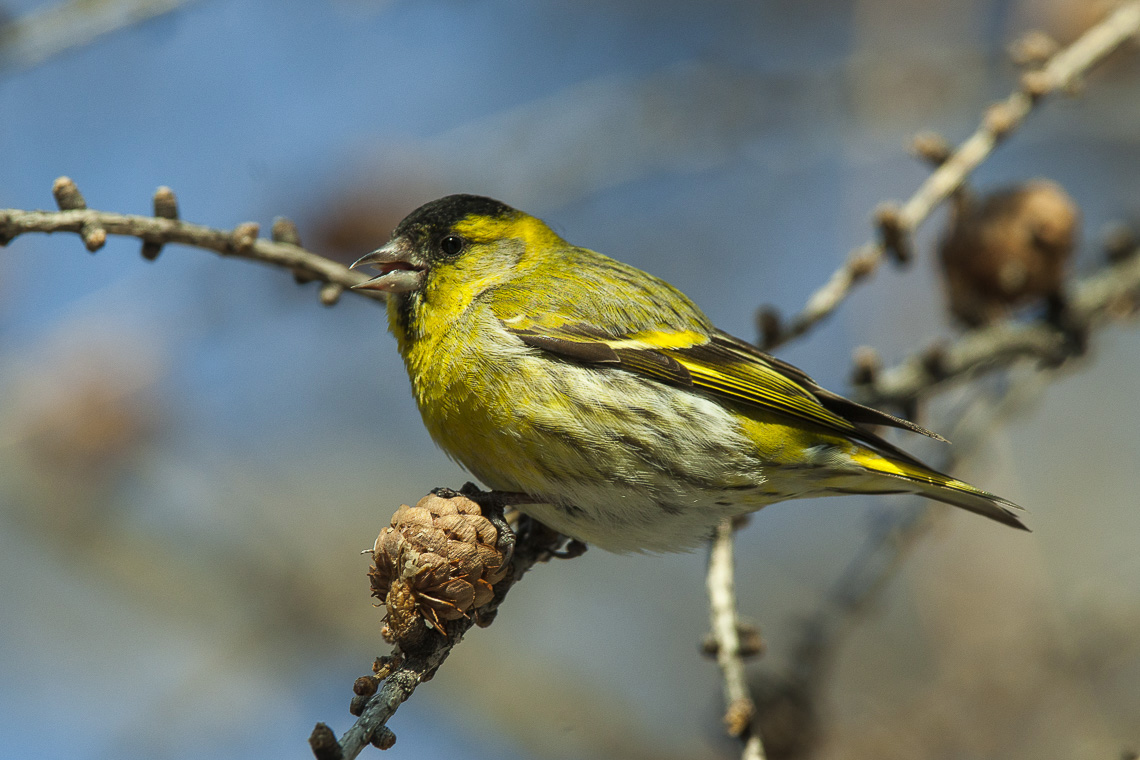
Eurasian siskin, Italy

== Longspurs and snow buntings ==
Order: Passeriformes Family: Calcariidae

The Calcariidae are a group of passerine birds which had been traditionally grouped with the buntings, but differ in a number of respects and are usually found in open grassy areas.

- Lapland longspur Calcarius lapponicus Zigolo della Lapponia – A
- Snow bunting Plectrophenax nivalis Zigolo delle nevi – A

== Old World buntings ==
Order: Passeriformes Family: Emberizidae

The buntings are a large family of passerine birds native to the Old World. They are seed and insect eating birds with distinctively shaped bills. Many emberizid species have distinctive head patterns.

- Black-headed bunting Emberiza melanocephala Zigolo capinero – A
- Red-headed bunting Emberiza bruniceps Zigolo testaranciata – A
- Corn bunting Emberiza calandra Strillozzo – A
- Rock bunting Emberiza cia Zigolo muciatto – A
- Ortolan bunting Emberiza hortulana Ortolano – A
- Cretzschmar's bunting Emberiza caesia Ortolano grigio – A
- Cirl bunting Emberiza cirlus Zigolo nero – A
- Yellowhammer Emberiza citrinella Zigolo giallo – A
- Pine bunting Emberiza leucocephalos Zigolo golarossa – A
- Reed bunting Emberiza schoeniclus Migliarino di palude – A
- Pallas's bunting Emberiza pallasi Migliarino di Pallas – A
- Yellow-breasted bunting Emberiza aureola Zigolo dal collare – A
- Rustic bunting Emberiza rustica Zigolo boschereccio – A
- Little bunting Emberiza pusilla Zigolo minore – A
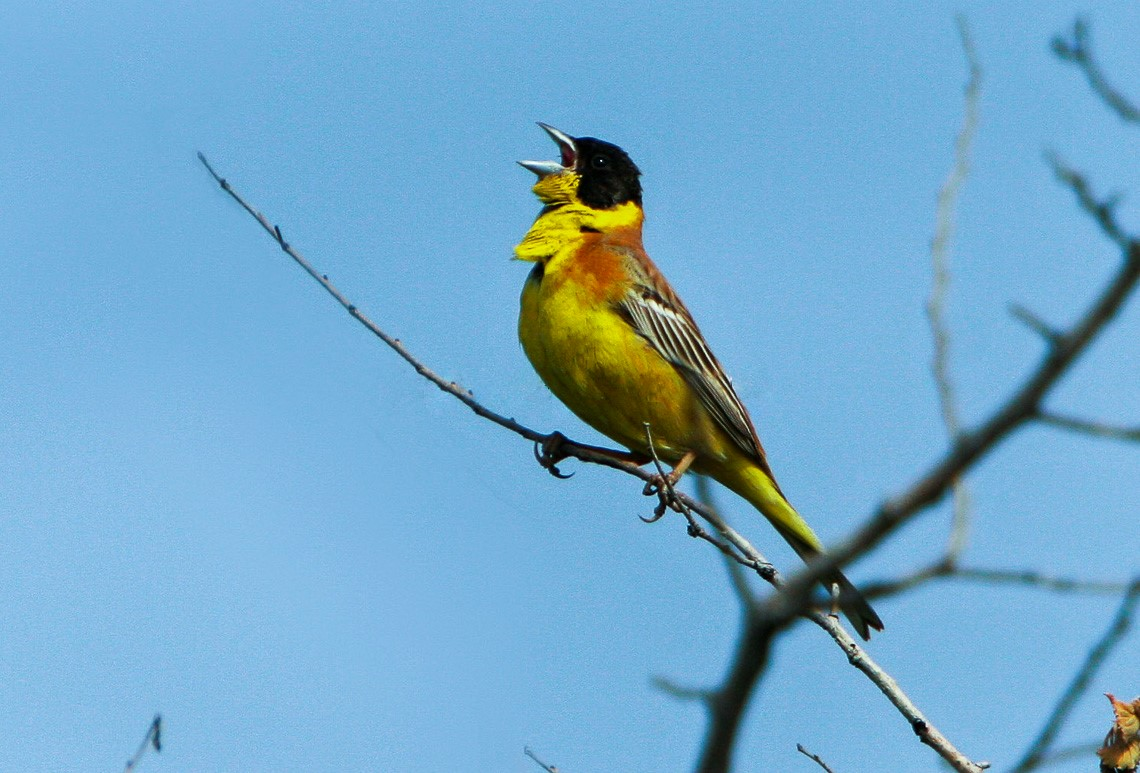
Black-headed bunting, Momperone, Piedmont

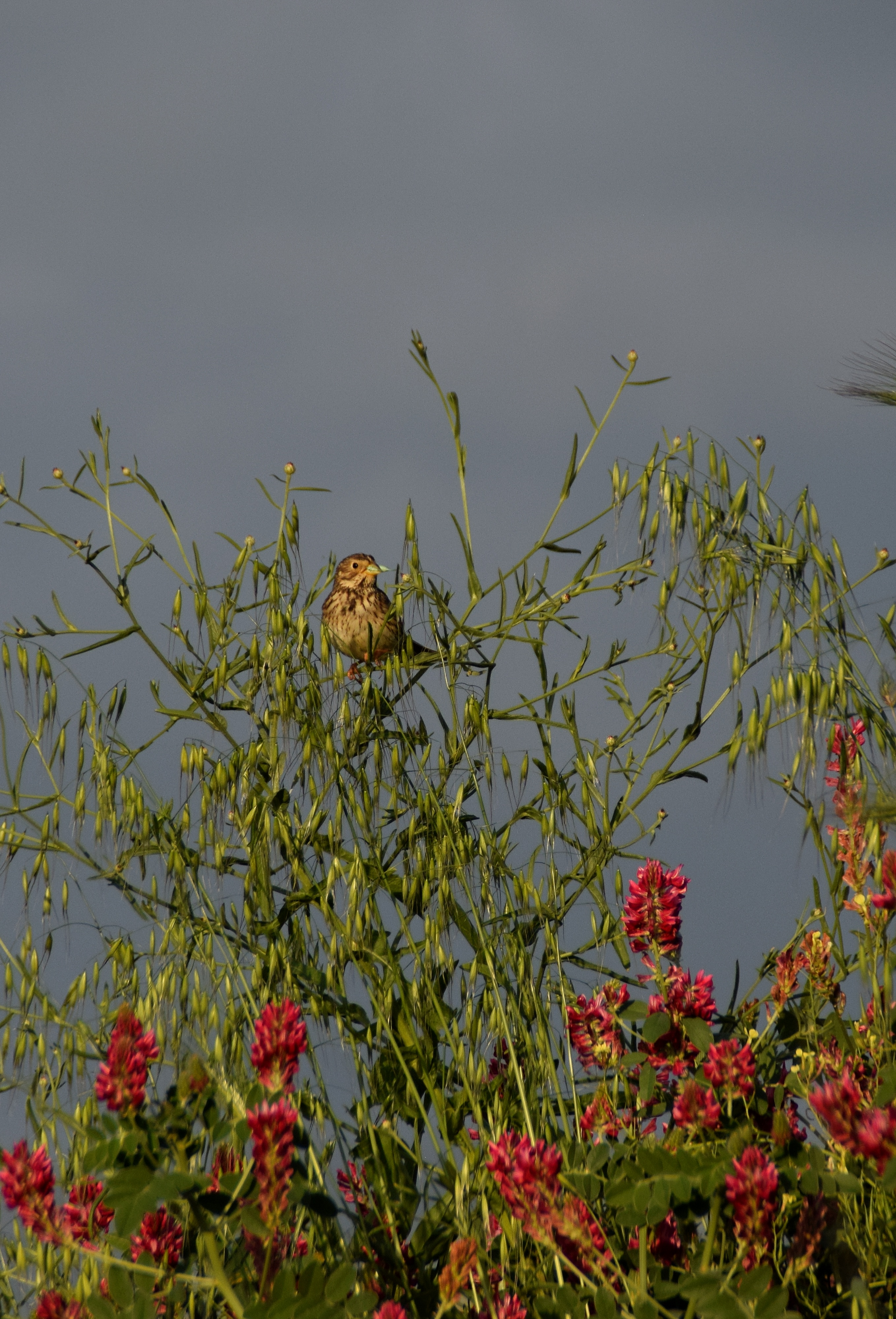
Corn bunting, Sicily

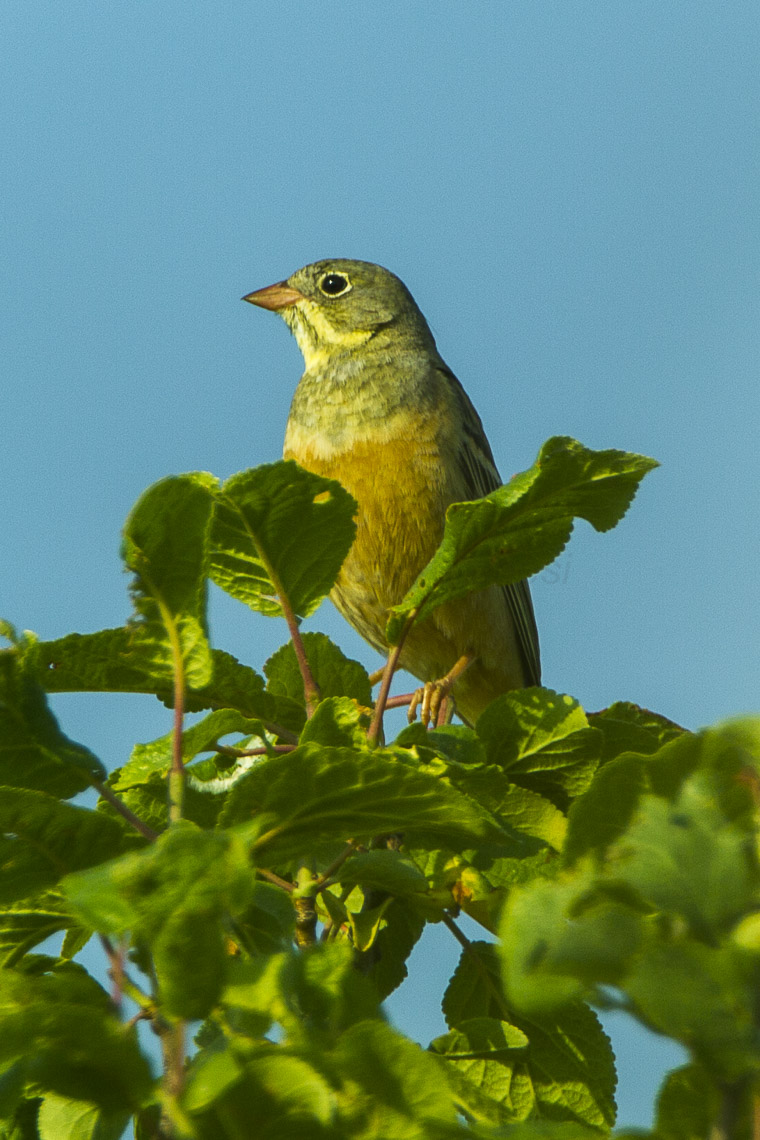
Ortolan bunting, Lombardy

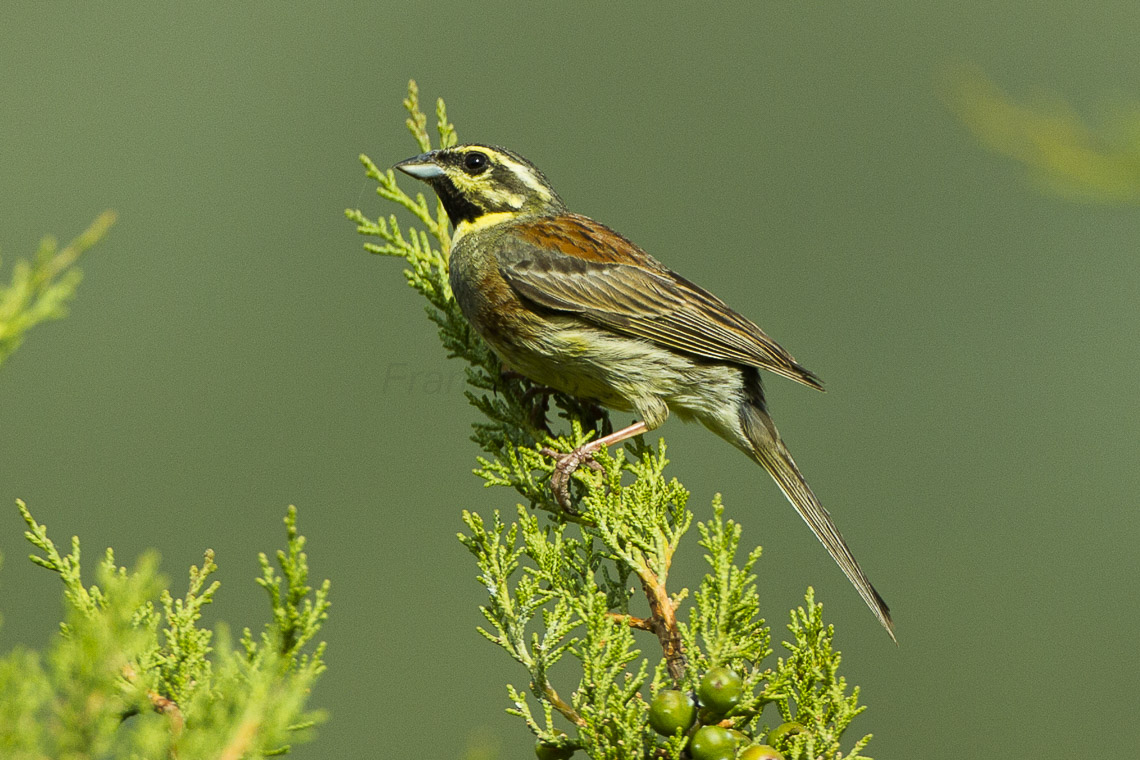
Cirl bunting, Sardinia

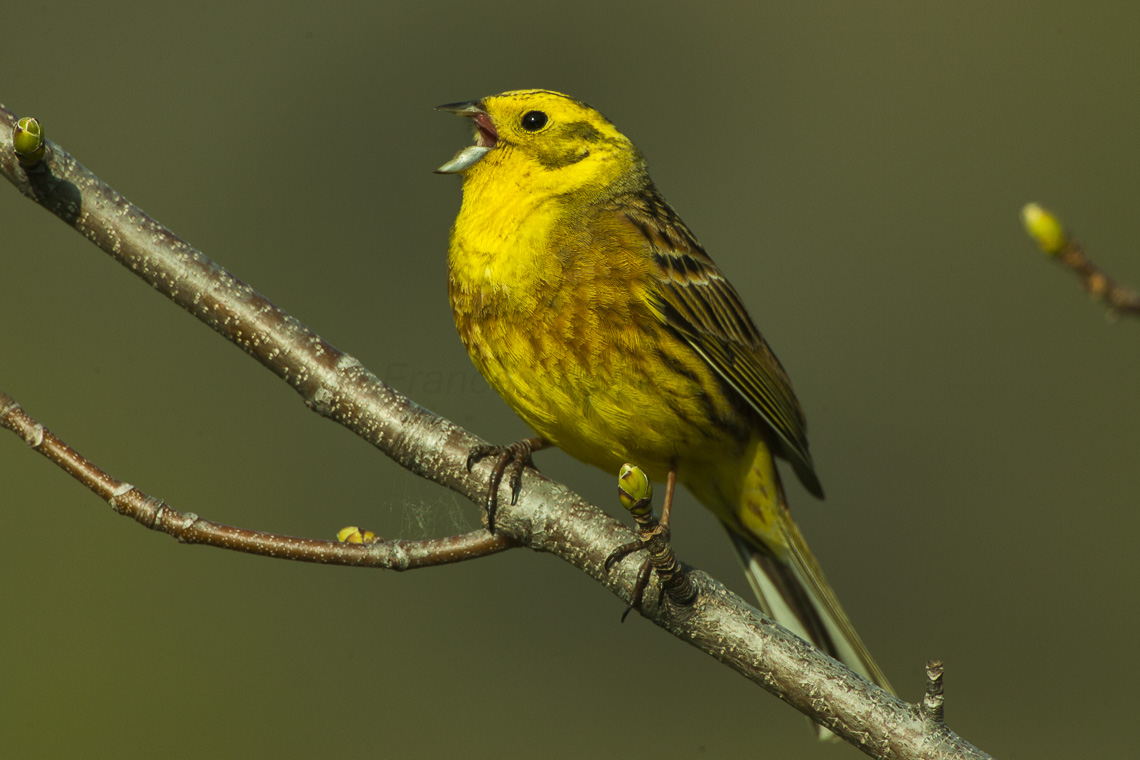
Yellowhammer, Aosta Valley

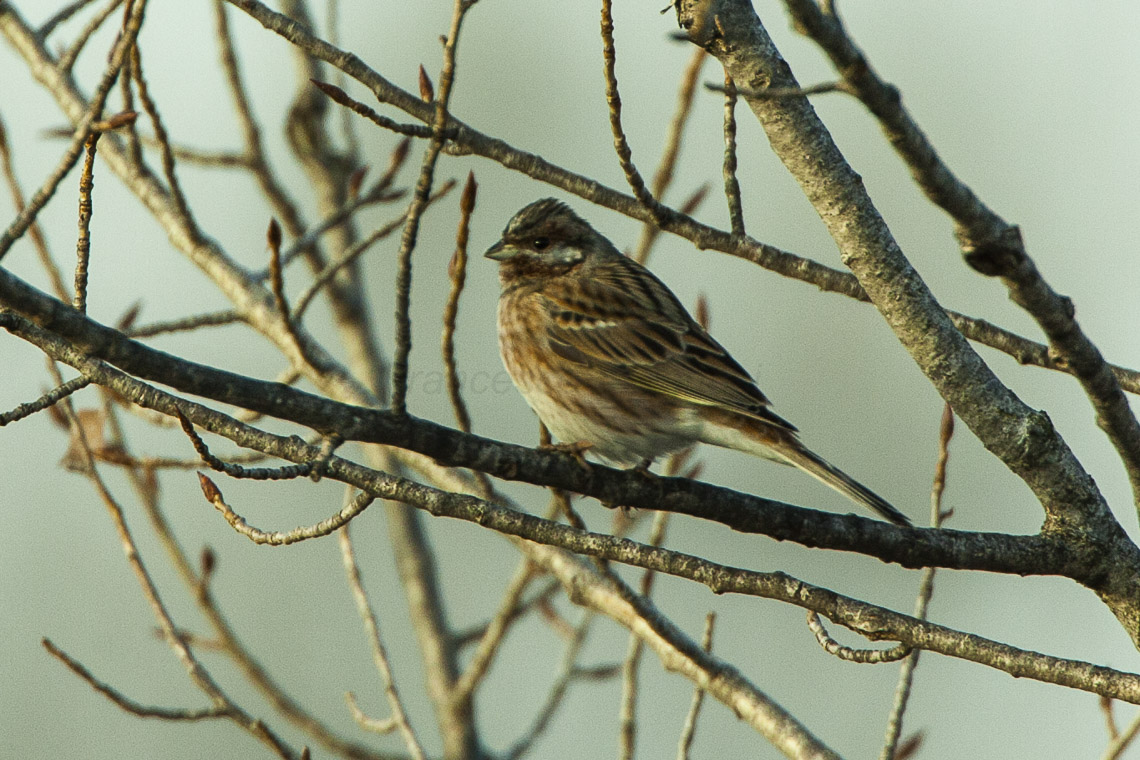
Pine bunting, Vivaro

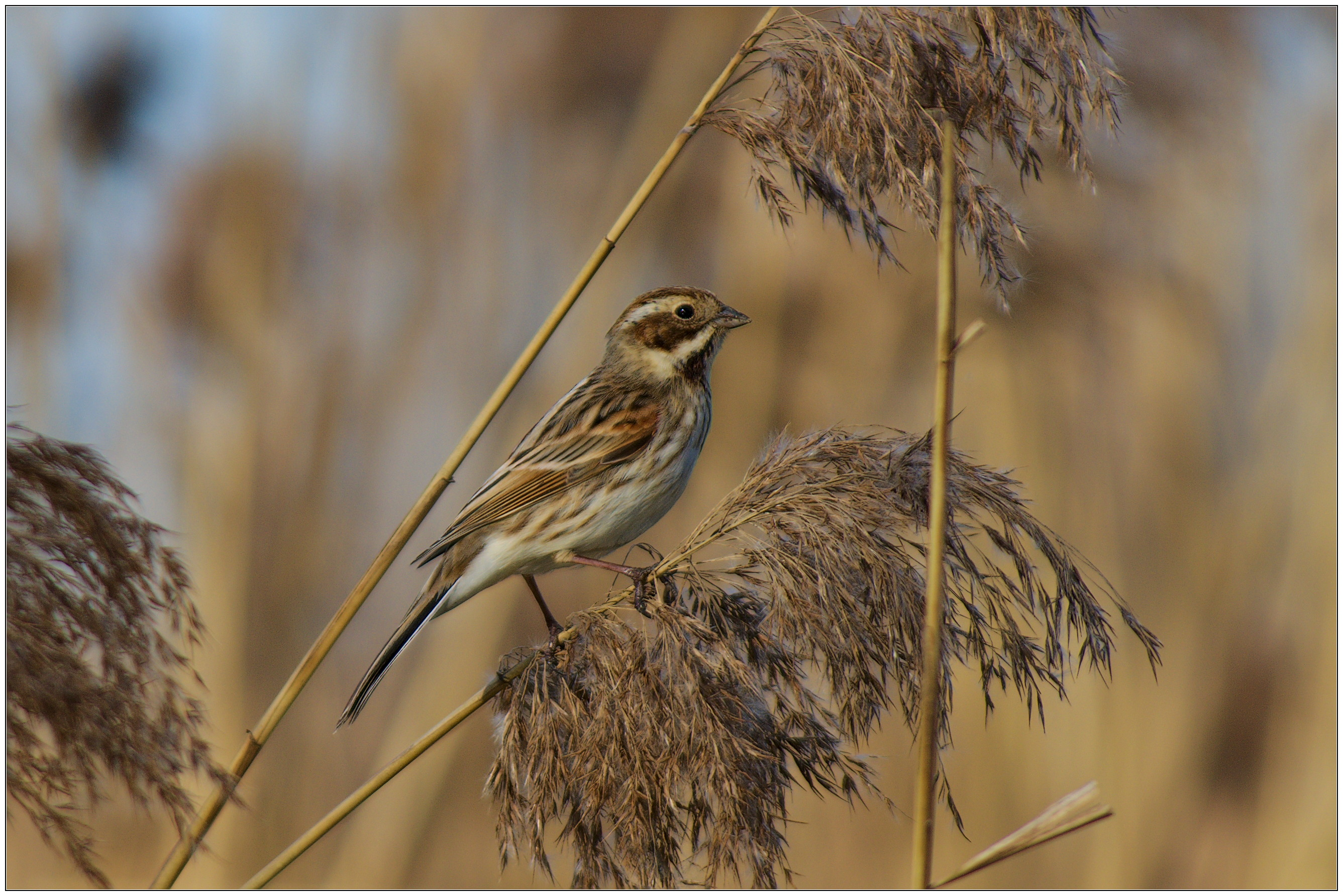
Reed bunting, Italy

== Troupials and allies ==
Order: Passeriformes Family: Icteridae

Icteridae is a family of small- to medium-sized, often brightly coloured, New World passerine birds. Most species have black as a predominant plumage colour, often enlivened by yellow, orange or red. Several have been recorded as vagrants in western Europe, with one species with an Italian record.

- Bobolink Dolichonyx oryzivorus Bobolink – A
