= List of birds of Algeria =

This is a list of the bird species recorded in Algeria. The avifauna of Algeria includes a total of 445 species.

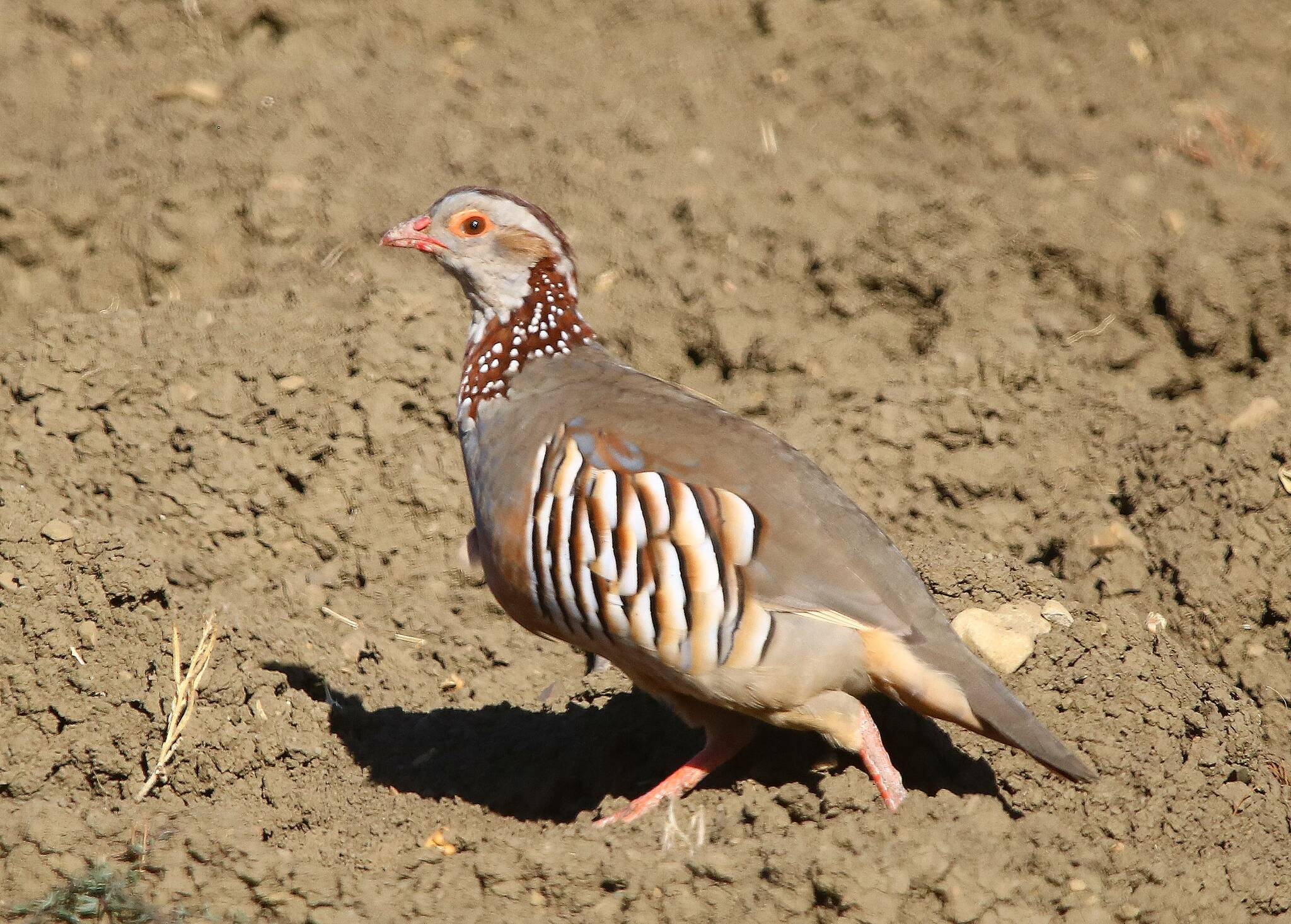
The Barbary partridge is the national bird of Algeria

This list's taxonomic treatment (designation and sequence of orders, families and species) and nomenclature (common and scientific names) follow the conventions of The Clements Checklist of Birds of the World, 2022 edition. The family accounts at the beginning of each heading reflect this taxonomy, as do the species counts found in each family account. Introduced and accidental species are included in the total counts for Algeria.

The following tags have been used to highlight several categories. The commonly occurring native species do not fall into any of these categories.

- (A) Accidental - a species that rarely or accidentally occurs in Algeria
- (E) Endemic - a species endemic to Algeria
- (I) Introduced - a species introduced to Algeria as a consequence, direct or indirect, of human actions
- (Ex) Extirpated - a species that no longer occurs in Algeria although populations exist elsewhere

== Ostriches ==
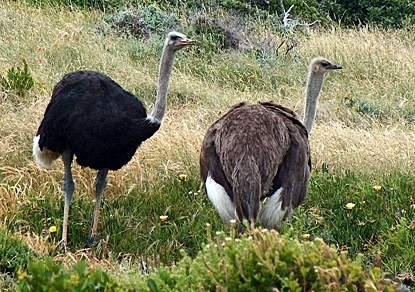
Common ostrich

Order: Struthioniformes Family: Struthionidae

The ostrich is a flightless bird native to Africa. It is the largest living species of bird. It is distinctive in its appearance, with a long neck and legs and the ability to run at high speeds.

- Common ostrich, Struthio camelus LC

== Ducks, geese, and waterfowl ==
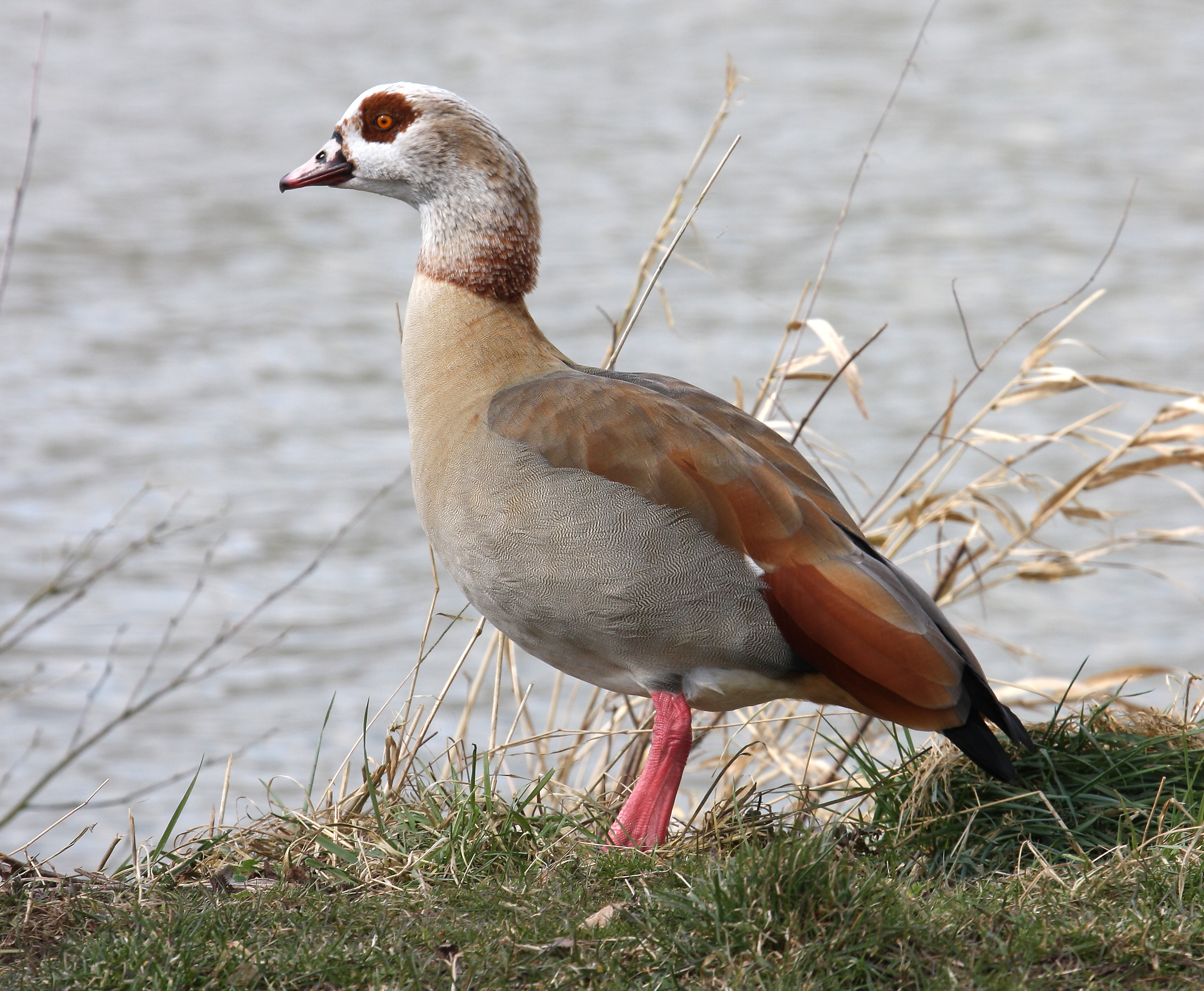
Egyptian goose

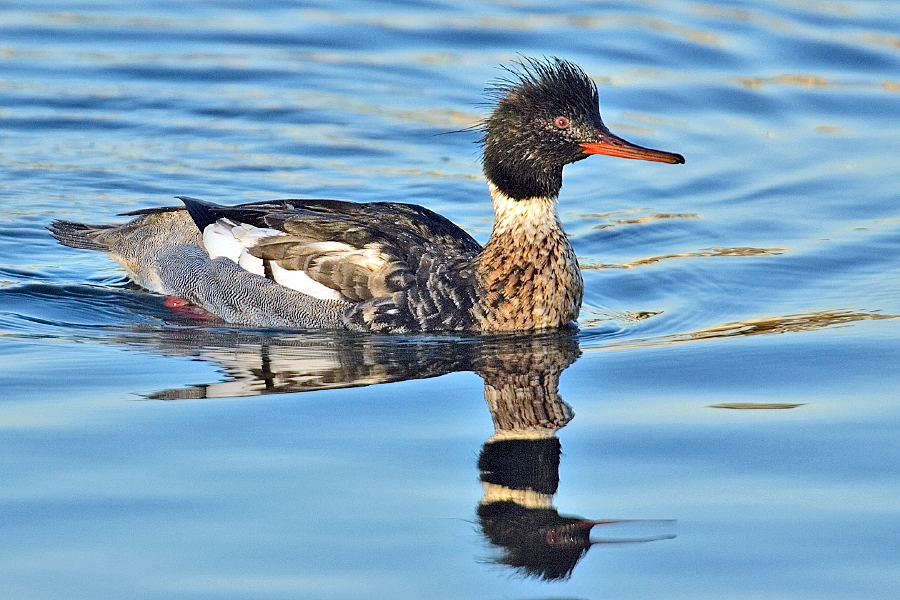
Red-breasted merganser

Order: Anseriformes Family: Anatidae

Anatidae includes the ducks and most duck-like waterfowl, such as geese and swans. These birds are adapted to an aquatic existence with webbed feet, flattened bills, and feathers that are excellent at shedding water due to an oily coating.

- Graylag goose, Anser anser LC
- Greater white-fronted goose, Anser albifrons (A) LC
- Lesser white-fronted goose, Anser erythropus (A) VU
- Taiga bean-goose, Anser fabalis (A) LC
- Brant, Branta bernicla LC
- Barnacle goose, Branta leucopsis (A) LC
- Red-breasted goose, Branta ruficollis (A) VU
- Mute swan, Cygnus olor LC
- Tundra swan, Cygnus columbianus LC
- Whooper swan, Cygnus cygnus LC
- Egyptian goose, Alopochen aegyptiacus (A) LC
- Ruddy shelduck, Tadorna ferruginea LC
- Common shelduck, Tadorna tadorna LC
- Garganey, Spatula querquedula LC
- Blue-winged teal, Spatula discors (A) LC
- Northern shoveler, Spatula clypeata LC
- Gadwall, Mareca strepera LC
- Eurasian wigeon, Mareca penelope LC
- Mallard, Anas platyrhynchos LC
- Northern pintail, Anas acuta LC
- Green-winged teal, Anas crecca LC
- Marbled teal, Marmaronetta angustirostris NT
- Red-crested pochard, Netta rufina (Ex) LC
- Common pochard, Aythya ferina VU
- Ring-necked duck, Aythya collaris (A) LC
- Ferruginous duck, Aythya nyroca NT
- Tufted duck, Aythya fuligula LC
- Greater scaup, Aythya marila LC
- Lesser scaup, Aythya affinis (A) LC
- Velvet scoter, Melanitta fusca VU
- Common scoter, Melanitta nigra (A) LC
- Common goldeneye, Bucephala clangula (A) LC
- Smew, Mergellus albellus (A) LC
- Common merganser, Mergus merganser LC
- Red-breasted merganser, Mergus serrator LC
- Ruddy duck, Oxyura jamaicensis (I) LC
- White-headed duck, Oxyura leucocephala EN

== Pheasants, grouse, and allies ==
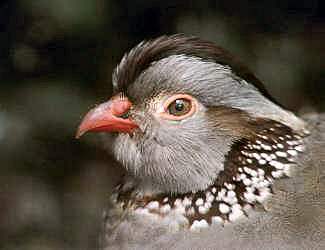
Barbary partridge

Order: Galliformes Family: Phasianidae

The Phasianidae are a family of terrestrial birds which consists of quails, partridges, snowcocks, francolins, spurfowls, tragopans, monals, pheasants, peafowls and jungle fowls. In general, they are plump (although they vary in size) and have broad, relatively short wings.

- Ring-necked pheasant, Phasianus colchicus (I) LC
- Common quail, Coturnix coturnix LC
- Barbary partridge, Alectoris barbara LC
- Red-legged partridge, Alectoris rufa (I) NT

== Flamingos ==
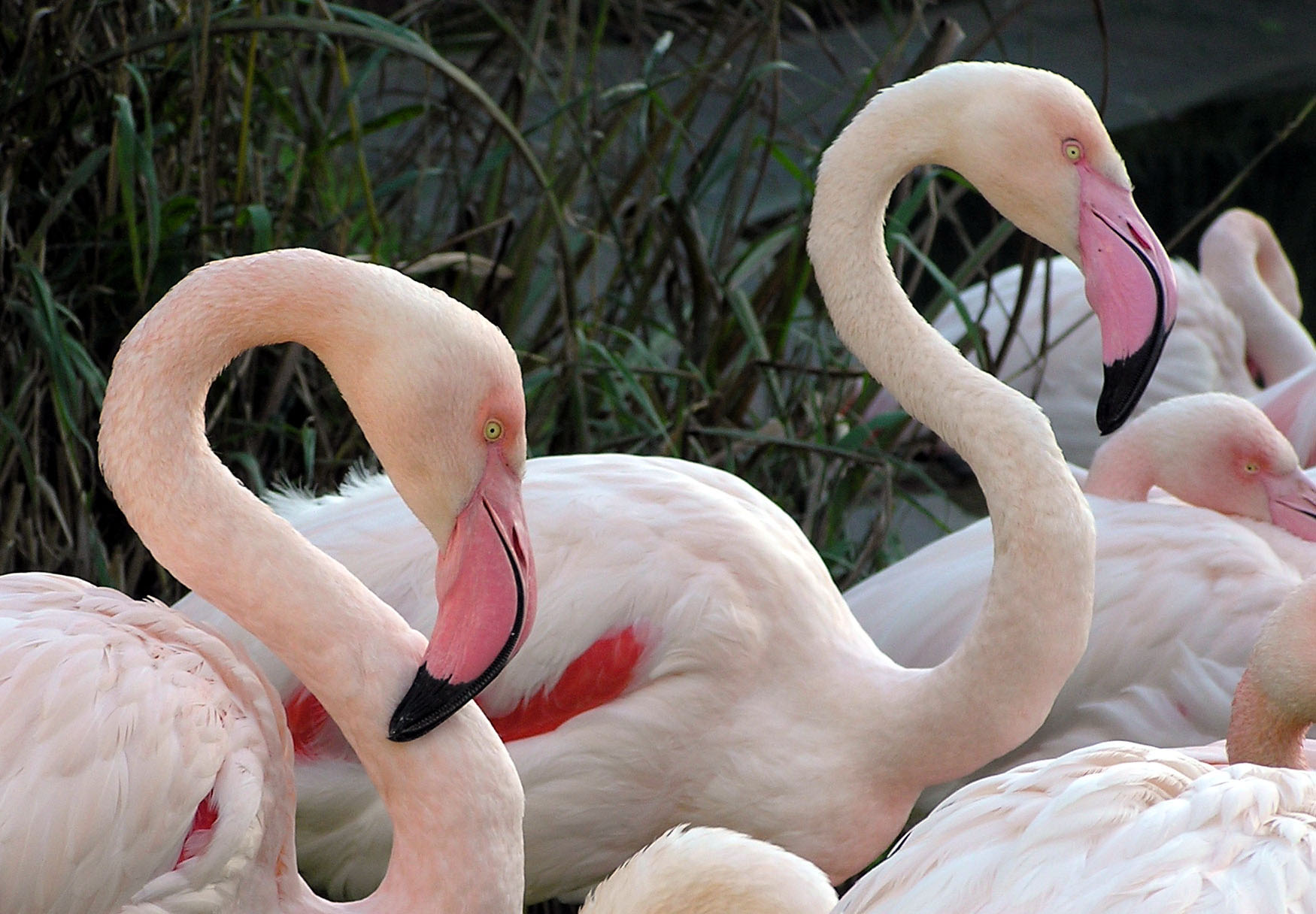
Greater flamingo

Order: Phoenicopteriformes Family: Phoenicopteridae

Flamingos are gregarious wading birds, usually 3 to 5 feet (0.9 to 1.5 m) tall, found in both the Western and Eastern Hemispheres. Flamingos filter-feed on shellfish and algae. Their oddly shaped beaks are specially adapted to separate mud and silt from the food they consume and, uniquely, are used upside-down.

- Greater flamingo, Phoenicopterus roseus LC
- Lesser flamingo, Phoenicopterus minor (A) NT

== Grebes ==
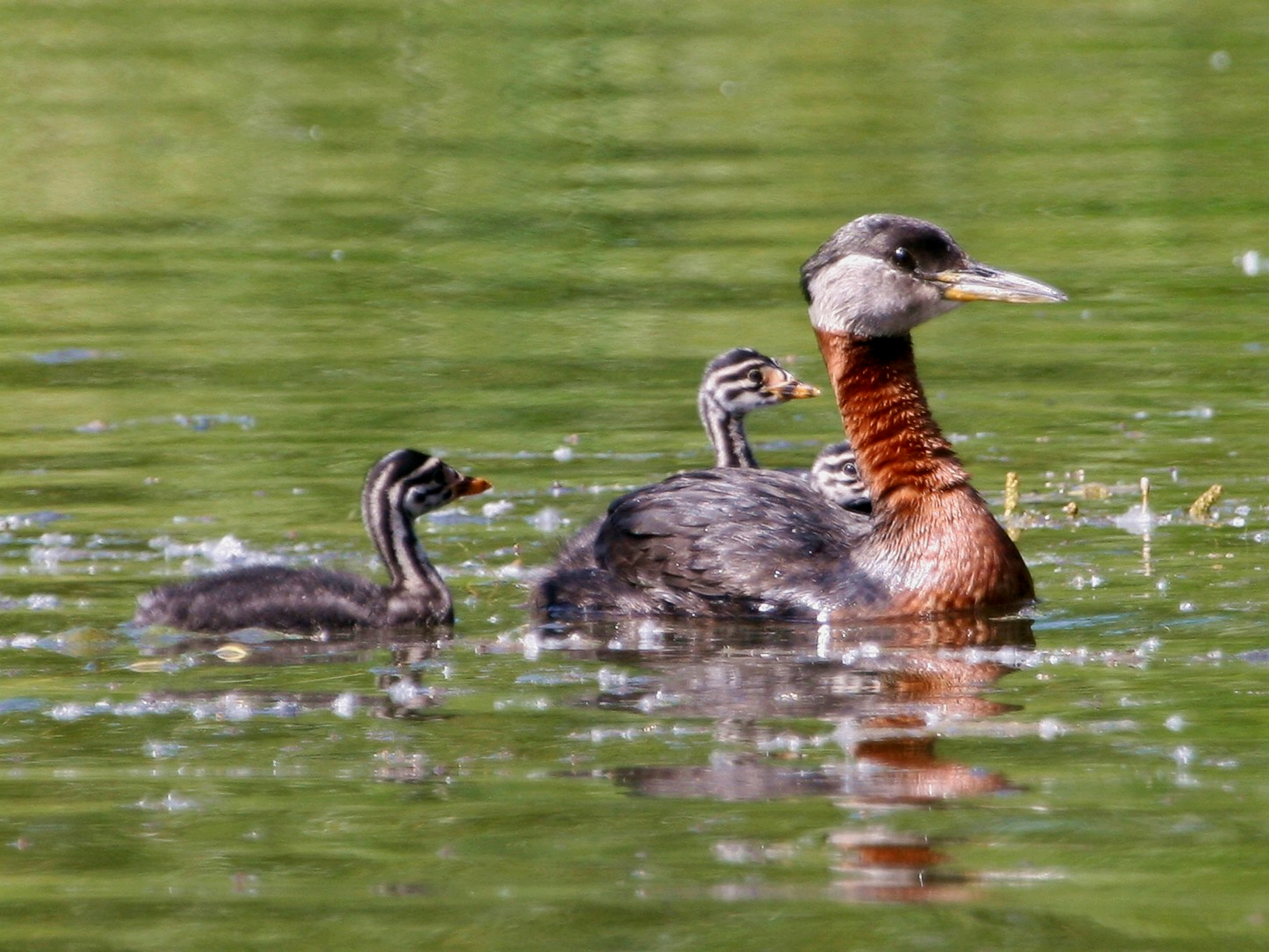
Adult and chick red-necked grebe

Order: Podicipediformes Family: Podicipedidae

Grebes are small to medium-large freshwater diving birds. They have lobed toes and are excellent swimmers and divers. However, they have their feet placed far back on the body, making them quite ungainly on land.

- Little grebe, Tachybaptus ruficollis LC
- Horned grebe, Podiceps auritus VU
- Red-necked grebe, Podiceps grisegena (A) LC
- Great crested grebe, Podiceps cristatus LC
- Eared grebe, Podiceps nigricollis LC

== Pigeons and doves ==
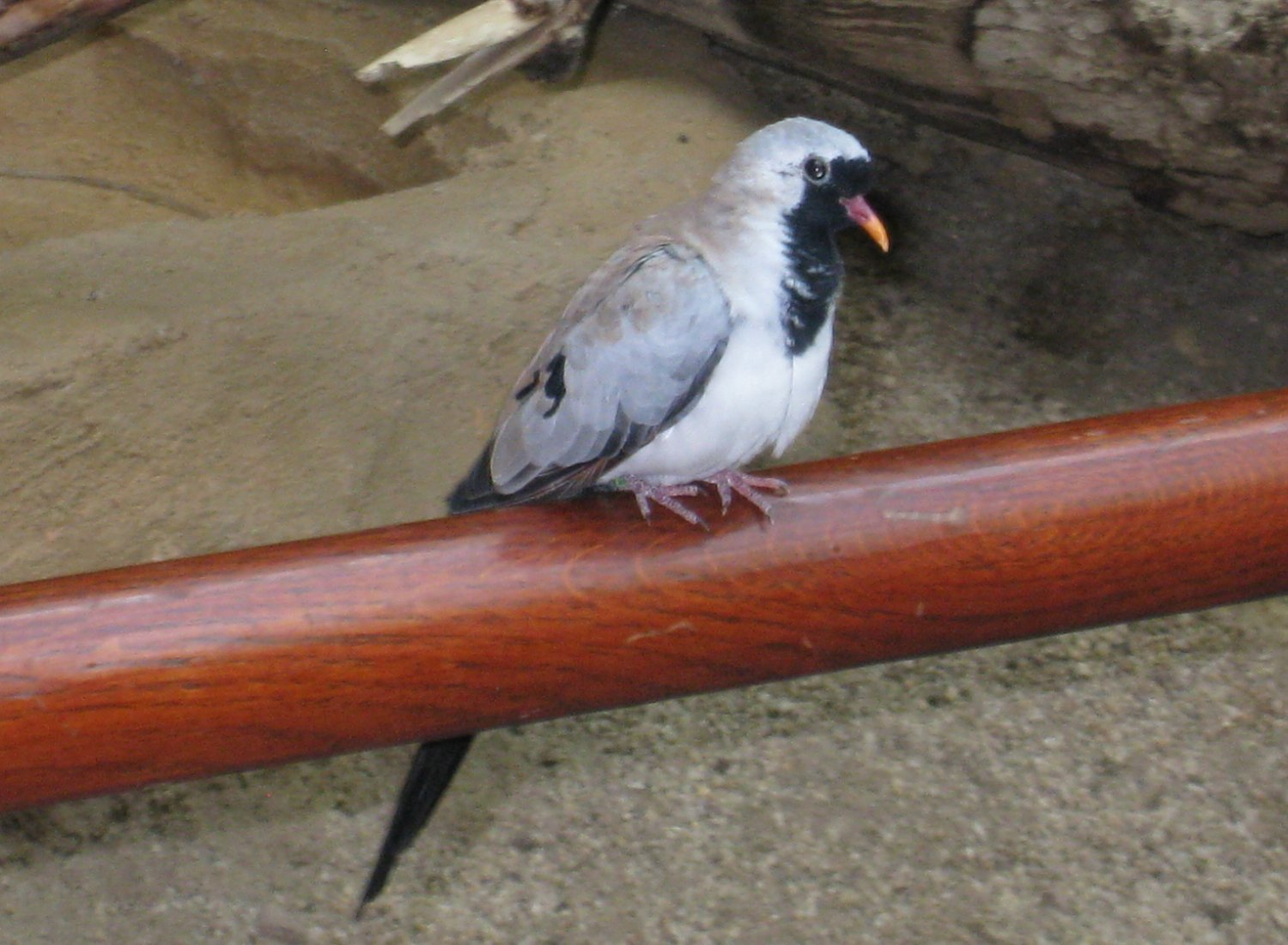
Namaqua dove

Order: Columbiformes Family: Columbidae

Pigeons and doves are stout-bodied birds with short necks and short slender bills with a fleshy cere.

- Rock pigeon, Columba livia LC
- Stock dove, Columba oenas (A) LC
- Common wood-pigeon, Columba palumbus LC
- European turtle-dove, Streptopelia turtur VU
- Eurasian collared-dove, Streptopelia decaocto (I) LC
- African collared-dove, Streptopelia roseogrisea (A) LC
- Laughing dove, Streptopelia senegalensis LC
- Namaqua dove, Oena capensis LC

== Sandgrouse ==
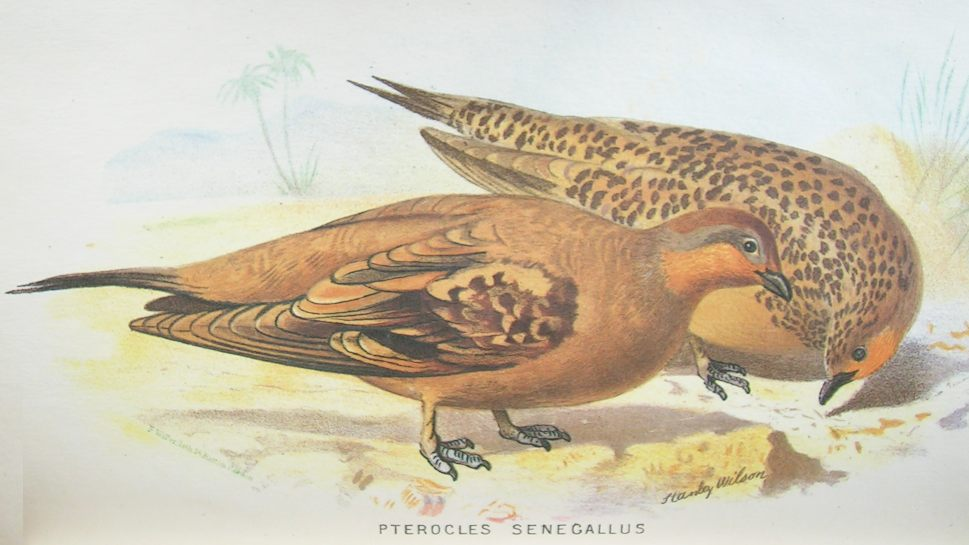
Illustration of spotted sandgrouse

Order: Pterocliformes Family: Pteroclidae

Sandgrouse have small, pigeon like heads and necks, but sturdy compact bodies. They have long pointed wings and sometimes tails and a fast direct flight. Flocks fly to watering holes at dawn and dusk. Their legs are feathered down to the toes.

- Pin-tailed sandgrouse, Pterocles alchata LC
- Chestnut-bellied sandgrouse, Pterocles exustus (A) LC
- Spotted sandgrouse, Pterocles senegallus LC
- Black-bellied sandgrouse, Pterocles orientalis LC
- Crowned sandgrouse, Pterocles coronatus LC
- Lichtenstein's sandgrouse, Pterocles lichtensteinii LC

== Bustards ==
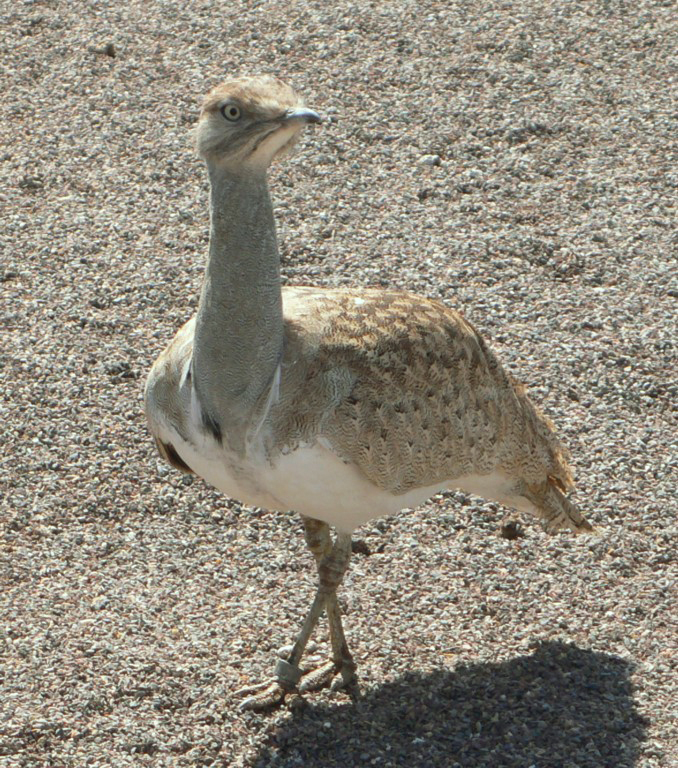
Houbara bustard

Order: Otidiformes Family: Otididae

Bustards are large terrestrial birds mainly associated with dry open country and steppes in the Old World. They are omnivorous and nest on the ground. They walk steadily on strong legs and big toes, pecking for food as they go. They have long broad wings with "fingered" wingtips and striking patterns in flight. Many have interesting mating displays.

- Great bustard, Otis tarda (Ex) EN
- Arabian bustard, Ardeotis arabs NT
- Houbara bustard, Chlamydotis undulata VU
- Little bustard, Tetrax tetrax (Ex) NT

== Cuckoos ==
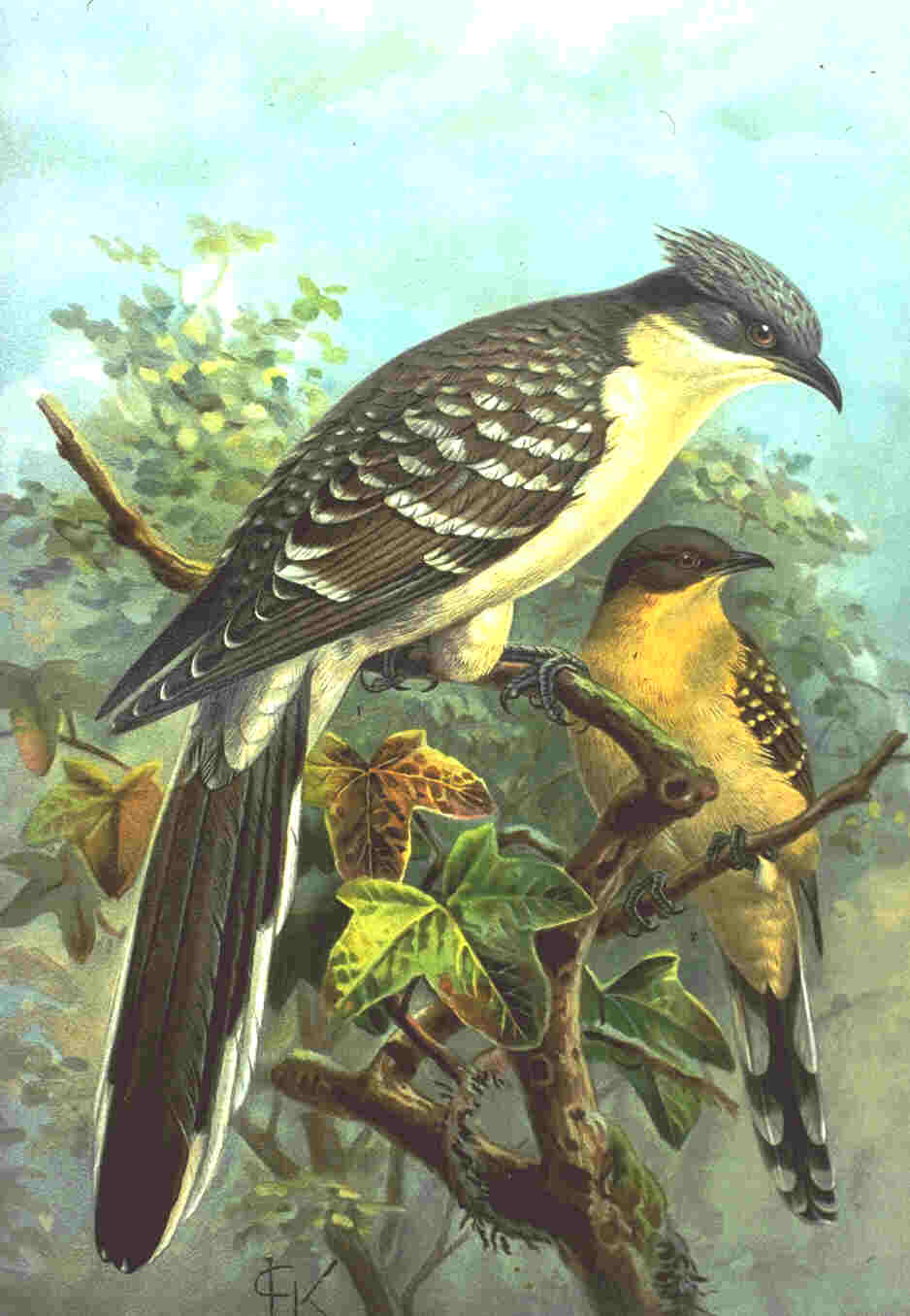
Illustration of a great spotted cuckoo

Order: Cuculiformes Family: Cuculidae

The family Cuculidae includes cuckoos, roadrunners and anis. These birds are of variable size with slender bodies, long tails and strong legs.

- Great spotted cuckoo, Clamator glandarius LC
- Pied cuckoo, Clamator jacobinus (A) LC
- Common cuckoo, Cuculus canorus LC

== Nightjars and allies ==
Order: Caprimulgiformes Family: Caprimulgidae

Nightjars are medium-sized nocturnal birds that usually nest on the ground. They have long wings, short legs and very short bills. Most have small feet, of little use for walking, and long pointed wings. Their soft plumage is camouflaged to resemble bark or leaves.

- Red-necked nightjar, Caprimulgus ruficollis NT
- Eurasian nightjar, Caprimulgus europaeus LC
- Egyptian nightjar, Caprimulgus aegyptius LC

== Swifts ==
Order: Caprimulgiformes Family: Apodidae

Swifts are small birds which spend the majority of their lives flying. These birds have very short legs and never settle voluntarily on the ground, perching instead only on vertical surfaces. Many swifts have long swept-back wings which resemble a crescent or boomerang.

- Alpine swift, Apus melba LC
- Common swift, Apus apus LC
- Pallid swift, Apus pallidus LC
- Little swift, Apus affinis LC

== Rails, gallinules, and coots ==
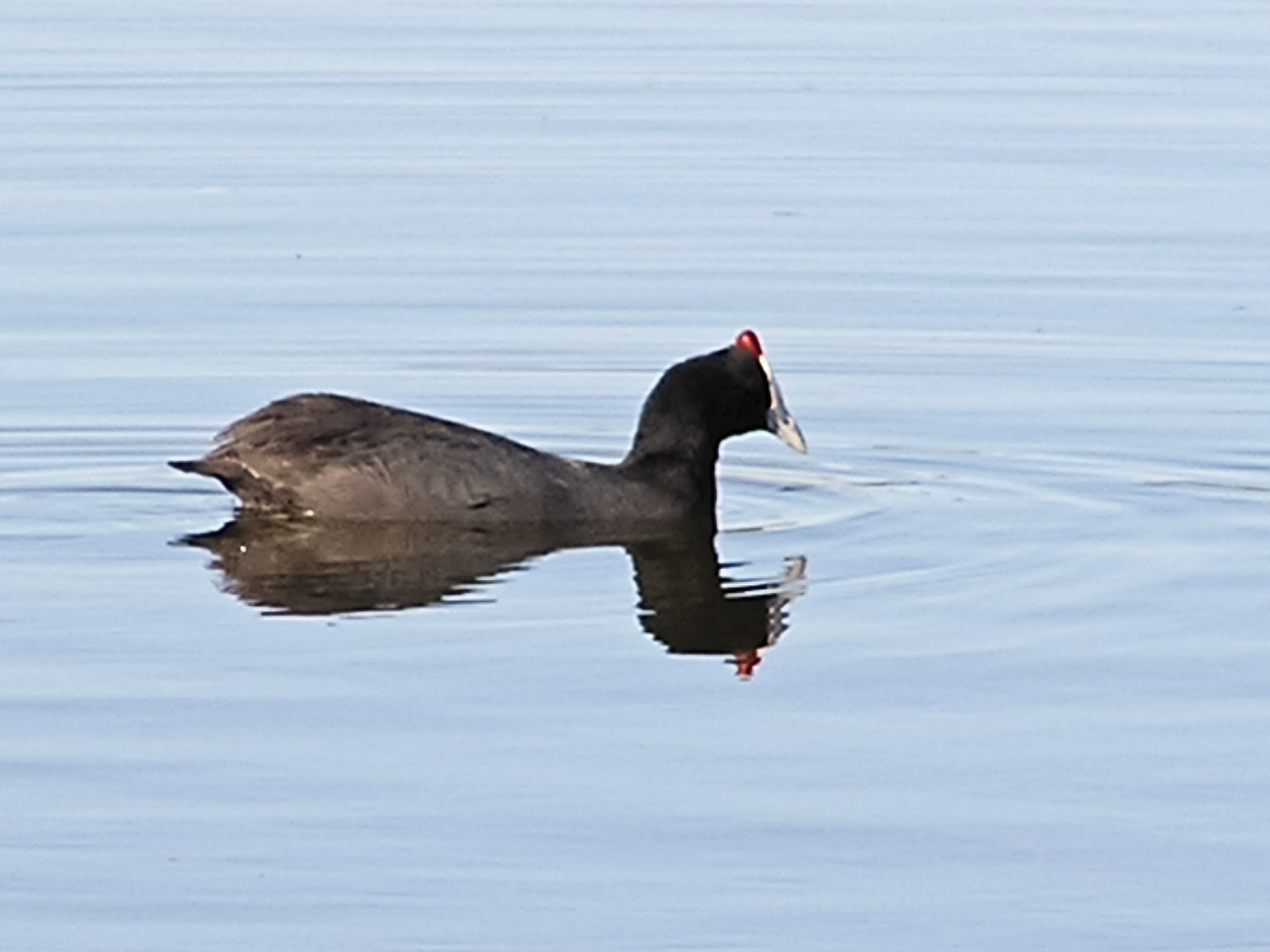
Red-knobbed coot

Order: Gruiformes Family: Rallidae

Rallidae is a large family of small to medium-sized birds which includes the rails, crakes, coots and gallinules. Typically they inhabit dense vegetation in damp environments near lakes, swamps or rivers. In general they are shy and secretive birds, making them difficult to observe. Most species have strong legs and long toes which are well adapted to soft uneven surfaces. They tend to have short, rounded wings and to be weak fliers.

- Water rail, Rallus aquaticus LC
- Corn crake, Crex crex LC
- African crake, Crex egregia (A) LC
- Spotted crake, Porzana porzana LC
- Eurasian moorhen, Gallinula chloropus LC
- Eurasian coot, Fulica atra LC
- Red-knobbed coot, Fulica cristata LC
- Allen's gallinule, Porphyrio alleni (A) LC
- Western swamphen, Porphyrio porphyrio LC
- Striped crake, Aenigmatolimnas marginalis (A) LC
- Little crake, Zapornia parva LC
- Baillon's crake, Zapornia pusilla LC

== Cranes ==
Order: Gruiformes Family: Gruidae

Cranes are large, long-legged and long-necked birds. Unlike the similar-looking but unrelated herons, cranes fly with necks outstretched, not pulled back. Most have elaborate and noisy courting displays or "dances".

- Demoiselle crane, Anthropoides virgo (Ex) LC
- Common crane, Grus grus LC

== Thick-knees ==
Order: Charadriiformes Family: Burhinidae

The thick-knees are a group of largely tropical waders in the family Burhinidae. They are found worldwide within the tropical zone, with some species also breeding in temperate Europe and Australia. They are medium to large waders with strong black or yellow-black bills, large yellow eyes and cryptic plumage. Despite being classed as waders, most species have a preference for arid or semi-arid habitats.

- Eurasian thick-knee, Burhinus oedicnemus LC

== Stilts and avocets ==
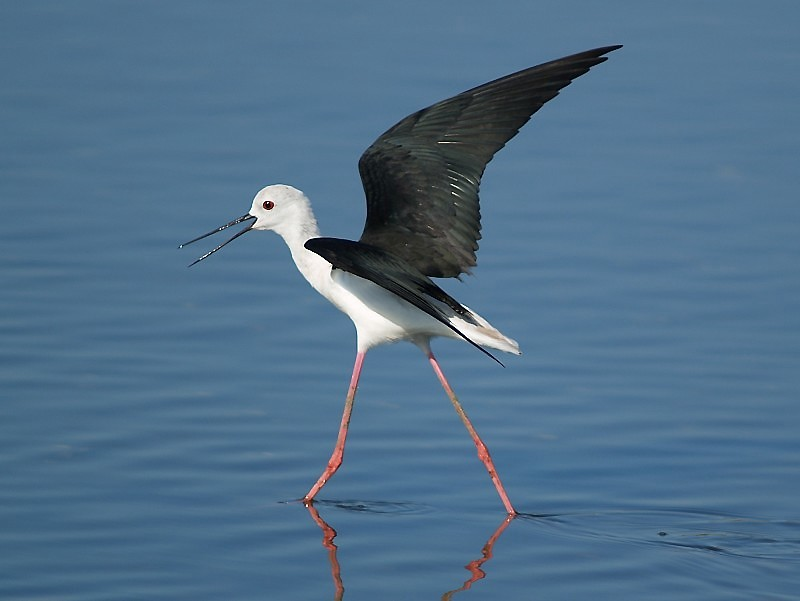
Black-winged stilt

Order: Charadriiformes Family: Recurvirostridae

Recurvirostridae is a family of large wading birds, which includes the avocets and stilts. The avocets have long legs and long up-curved bills. The stilts have extremely long legs and long, thin, straight bills.

- Black-winged stilt, Himantopus himantopus LC
- Pied avocet, Recurvirostra avosetta LC

== Oystercatchers ==
Order: Charadriiformes Family: Haematopodidae

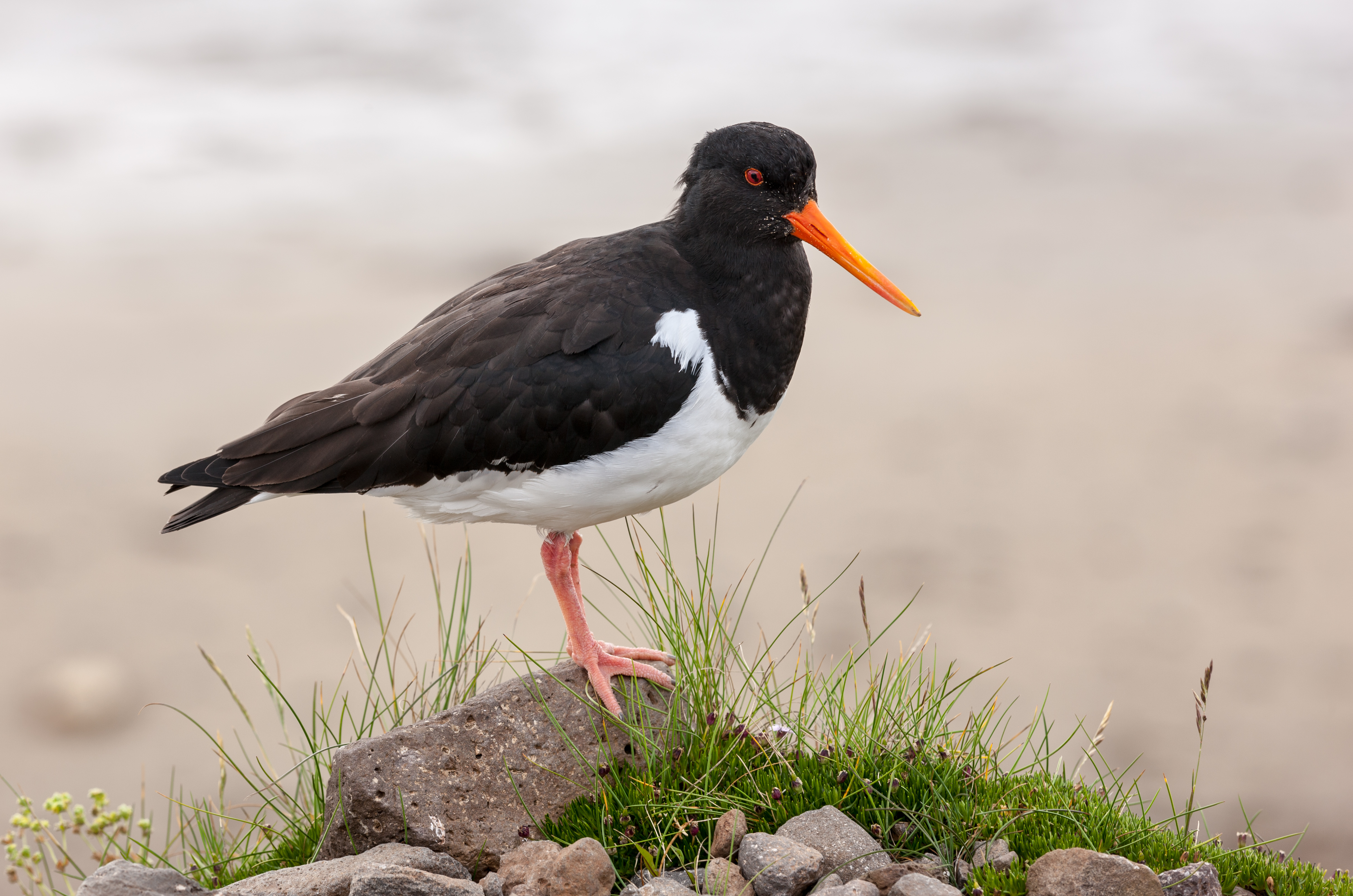
Eurasian oystercatcher, Haematopus ostralegus

The oystercatchers are large and noisy plover-like birds, with strong bills used for smashing or prising open molluscs.

- Eurasian oystercatcher, Haematopus ostralegus NT

== Plovers and lapwings ==
Order: Charadriiformes Family: Charadriidae

The family Charadriidae includes the plovers, dotterels and lapwings. They are small to medium-sized birds with compact bodies, short, thick necks and long, usually pointed, wings. They are found in open country worldwide, mostly in habitats near water.

- Black-bellied plover, Pluvialis squatarola LC
- European golden-plover, Pluvialis apricaria LC
- Pacific golden-plover, Pluvialis fulva (A) LC
- Northern lapwing, Vanellus vanellus NT
- White-tailed lapwing, Vanellus leucurus LC
- Kentish plover, Charadrius alexandrinus LC
- Common ringed plover, Charadrius hiaticula LC
- Little ringed plover, Charadrius dubius LC
- Eurasian dotterel, Charadrius morinellus LC

== Sandpipers and allies ==
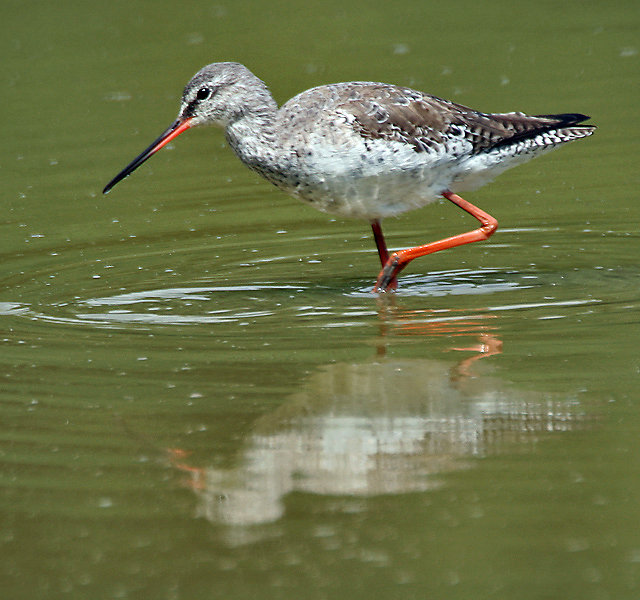
Spotted redshank

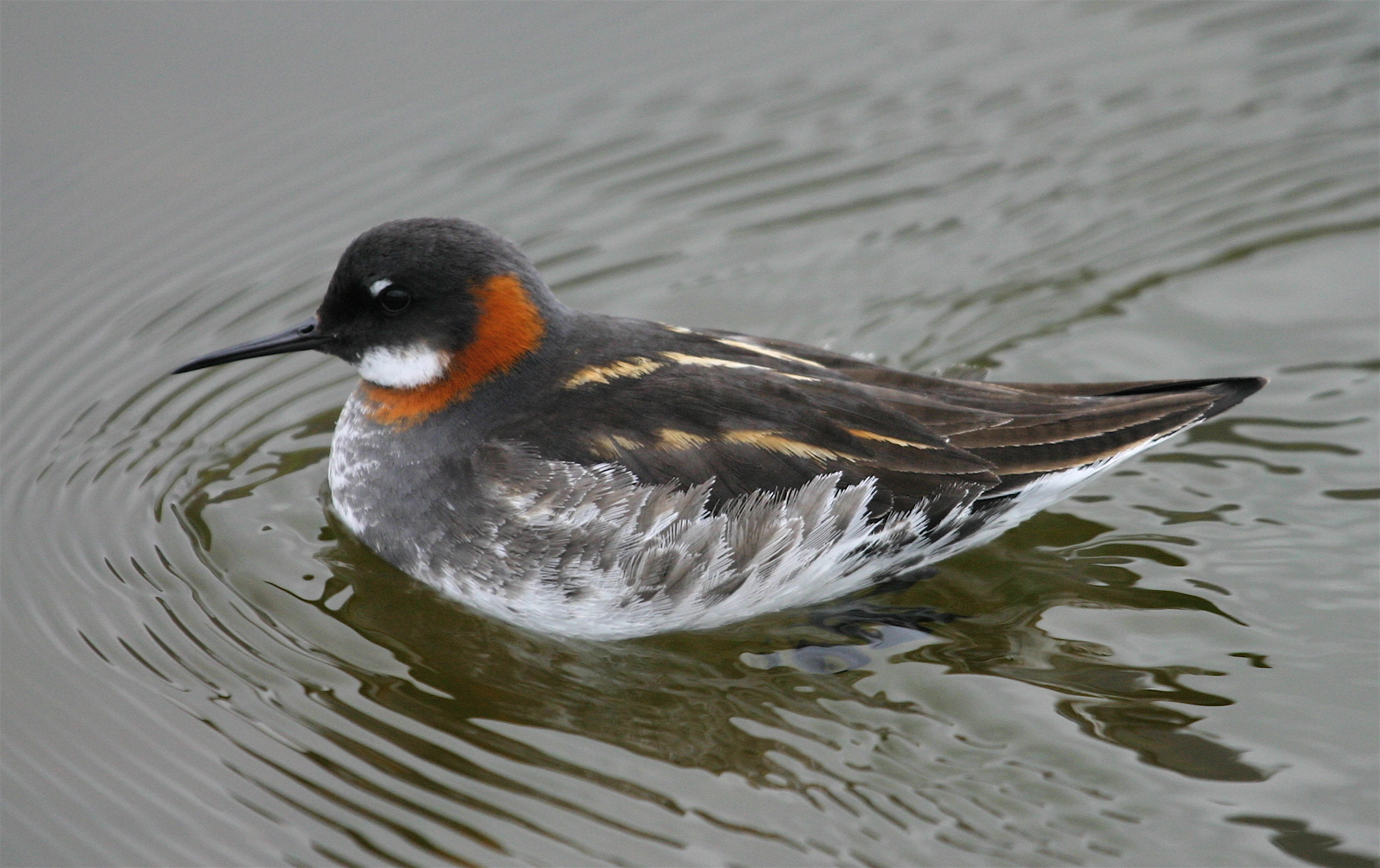
Red-necked phalarope

Order: Charadriiformes Family: Scolopacidae

Scolopacidae is a large diverse family of small to medium-sized shorebirds including the sandpipers, curlews, godwits, shanks, tattlers, woodcocks, snipes, dowitchers and phalaropes. The majority of these species eat small invertebrates picked out of the mud or soil. Variation in length of legs and bills enables multiple species to feed in the same habitat, particularly on the coast, without direct competition for food.

- Whimbrel, Numenius phaeopus LC
- Slender-billed curlew, Numenius tenuirostris CR
- Eurasian curlew, Numenius arquata NT
- Bar-tailed godwit, Limosa lapponica NT
- Black-tailed godwit, Limosa limosa NT
- Ruddy turnstone, Arenaria interpres LC
- Red knot, Calidris canutus NT
- Ruff, Calidris pugnax LC
- Curlew sandpiper, Calidris ferruginea NT
- Temminck's stint, Calidris temminckii LC
- Sanderling, Calidris alba LC
- Dunlin, Calidris alpina LC
- Little stint, Calidris minuta LC
- Pectoral sandpiper, Calidris melanotos (A) LC
- Jack snipe, Lymnocryptes minimus LC
- Eurasian woodcock, Scolopax rusticola LC
- Great snipe, Gallinago media NT
- Common snipe, Gallinago gallinago LC
- Red-necked phalarope, Phalaropus lobatus LC
- Common sandpiper, Actitis hypoleucos LC
- Green sandpiper, Tringa ochropus LC
- Spotted redshank, Tringa erythropus LC
- Common greenshank, Tringa nebularia LC
- Marsh sandpiper, Tringa stagnatilis LC
- Wood sandpiper, Tringa glareola LC
- Common redshank, Tringa totanus LC

== Buttonquails ==
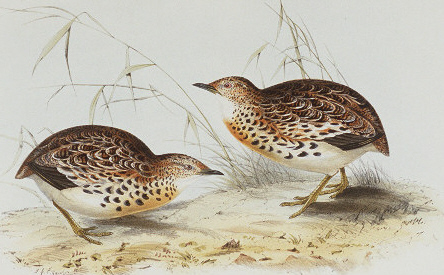
Gould's illustration of small buttonquail

Order: Charadriiformes Family: Turnicidae

The buttonquails are small, drab, running birds which resemble the true quails. The female is the brighter of the sexes and initiates courtship. The male incubates the eggs and tends the young.

- Small buttonquail, Turnix sylvaticus LC

== Pratincoles and coursers ==
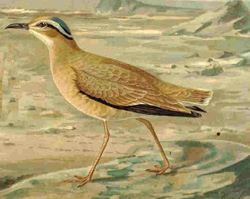
Illustration of cream-colored courser

Order: Charadriiformes Family: Glareolidae

Glareolidae is a family of wading birds comprising the pratincoles, which have short legs, long pointed wings and long forked tails, and the coursers, which have long legs, short wings and long, pointed bills which curve downwards.

- Cream-colored courser, Cursorius cursor LC
- Collared pratincole, Glareola pratincola LC

== Skuas and jaegers ==
Order: Charadriiformes Family: Stercorariidae

The family Stercorariidae are, in general, medium to large birds, typically with grey or brown plumage, often with white markings on the wings. They nest on the ground in temperate and arctic regions and are long-distance migrants.

- Great skua, Stercorarius skua LC
- Pomarine jaeger, Stercorarius pomarinus (A) LC
- Parasitic jaeger, Stercorarius parasiticus LC

== Auks, murres, and puffins ==
Order: Charadriiformes Family: Alcidae

Alcids are superficially similar to penguins due to their black-and-white colours, their upright posture and some of their habits, however they are not related to the penguins and differ in being able to fly. Auks live on the open sea, only deliberately coming ashore to nest.

- Common murre, Uria aalge (A) LC
- Razorbill, Alca torda LC
- Atlantic puffin, Fratercula arctica VU

== Gulls, terns, and skimmers ==
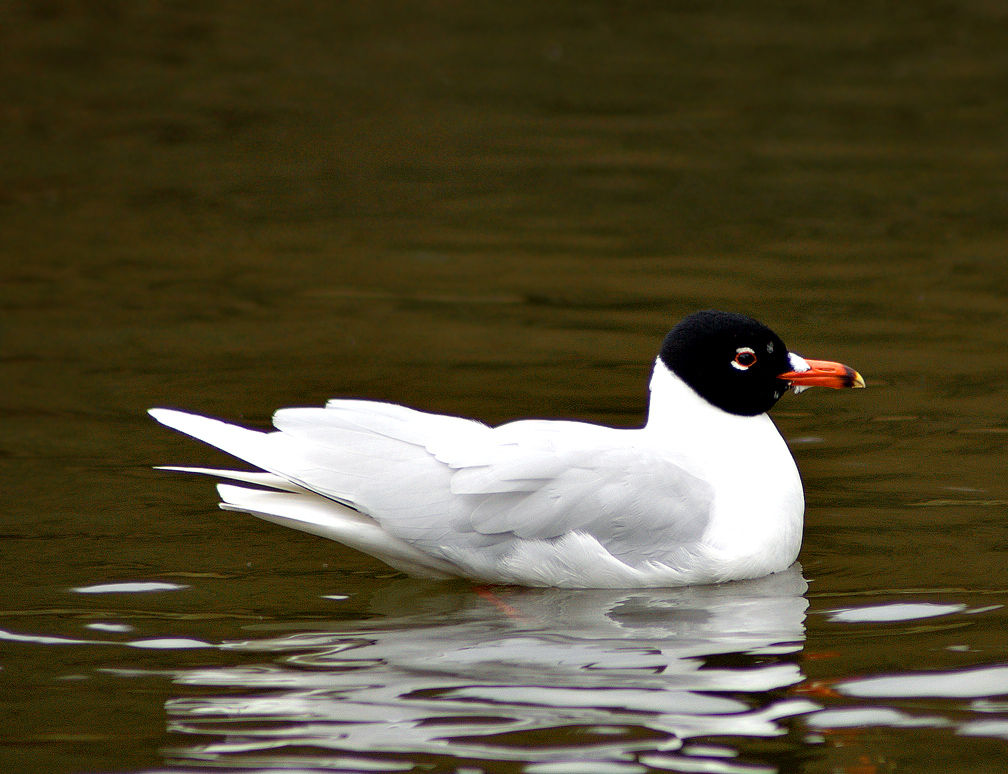
Mediterranean gull

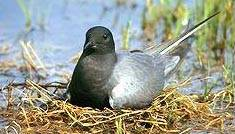
Black tern

Order: Charadriiformes Family: Laridae

Laridae is a family of medium to large seabirds, the gulls, terns, and skimmers. Gulls are typically grey or white, often with black markings on the head or wings. They have stout, longish bills and webbed feet. Terns are a group of generally medium to large seabirds typically with grey or white plumage, often with black markings on the head. Most terns hunt fish by diving but some pick insects off the surface of fresh water. Terns are generally long-lived birds, with several species known to live in excess of 30 years.

- Black-legged kittiwake, Rissa tridactyla VU
- Sabine's gull, Xema sabini (A) LC
- Slender-billed gull, Chroicocephalus genei LC
- Grey-hooded gull, Chroicocephalus cirrocephalus (A) LC
- Black-headed gull, Chroicocephalus ridibundus LC
- Little gull, Hydrocoloeus minutus LC
- Mediterranean gull, Ichthyaetus melanocephalus LC
- Audouin's gull, Ichthyaetus audouinii VU
- Common gull, Larus canus (A) LC
- Yellow-legged gull, Larus michahellis (A) LC
- Caspian gull, Larus cachinnans LC
- Lesser black-backed gull, Larus fuscus LC
- Great black-backed gull, Larus marinus LC
- Little tern, Sternula albifrons LC
- Gull-billed tern, Gelochelidon nilotica LC
- Caspian tern, Hydroprogne caspia LC
- Black tern, Chlidonias niger LC
- White-winged tern, Chlidonias leucopterus LC
- Whiskered tern, Chlidonias hybrida LC
- Roseate tern, Sterna dougallii LC
- Common tern, Sterna hirundo LC
- Arctic tern, Sterna paradisaea LC
- Sandwich tern, Thalasseus sandvicensis LC
- Lesser crested tern, Thalasseus bengalensis LC

== Loons ==
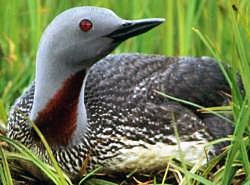
Red-throated loon

Order: Gaviiformes Family: Gaviidae

Loons, known as divers in Europe, are a group of aquatic birds found in many parts of North America and northern Europe. They are the size of a large duck or small goose, which they somewhat resemble when swimming, but to which they are completely unrelated.

- Red-throated loon, Gavia stellata (A) LC
- Arctic loon, Gavia arctica LC
- Common loon, Gavia immer LC

== Southern storm-petrels ==
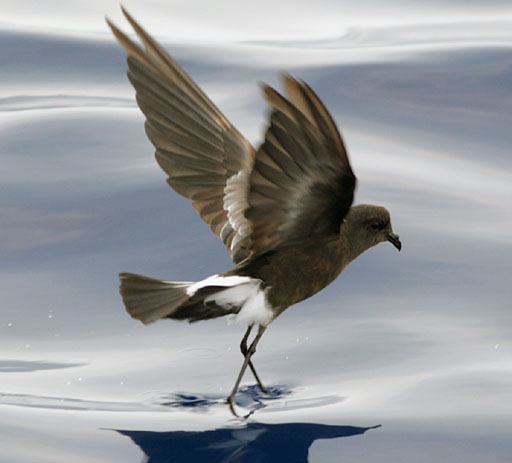
Wilson's storm petrel

Order: Procellariiformes Family: Oceanitidae

The austral storm petrels are relatives of the petrels and are the smallest seabirds. They feed on planktonic crustaceans and small fish picked from the surface, typically while hovering.

- Wilson's storm-petrel, Oceanites oceanicus LC

== Northern storm-petrels ==
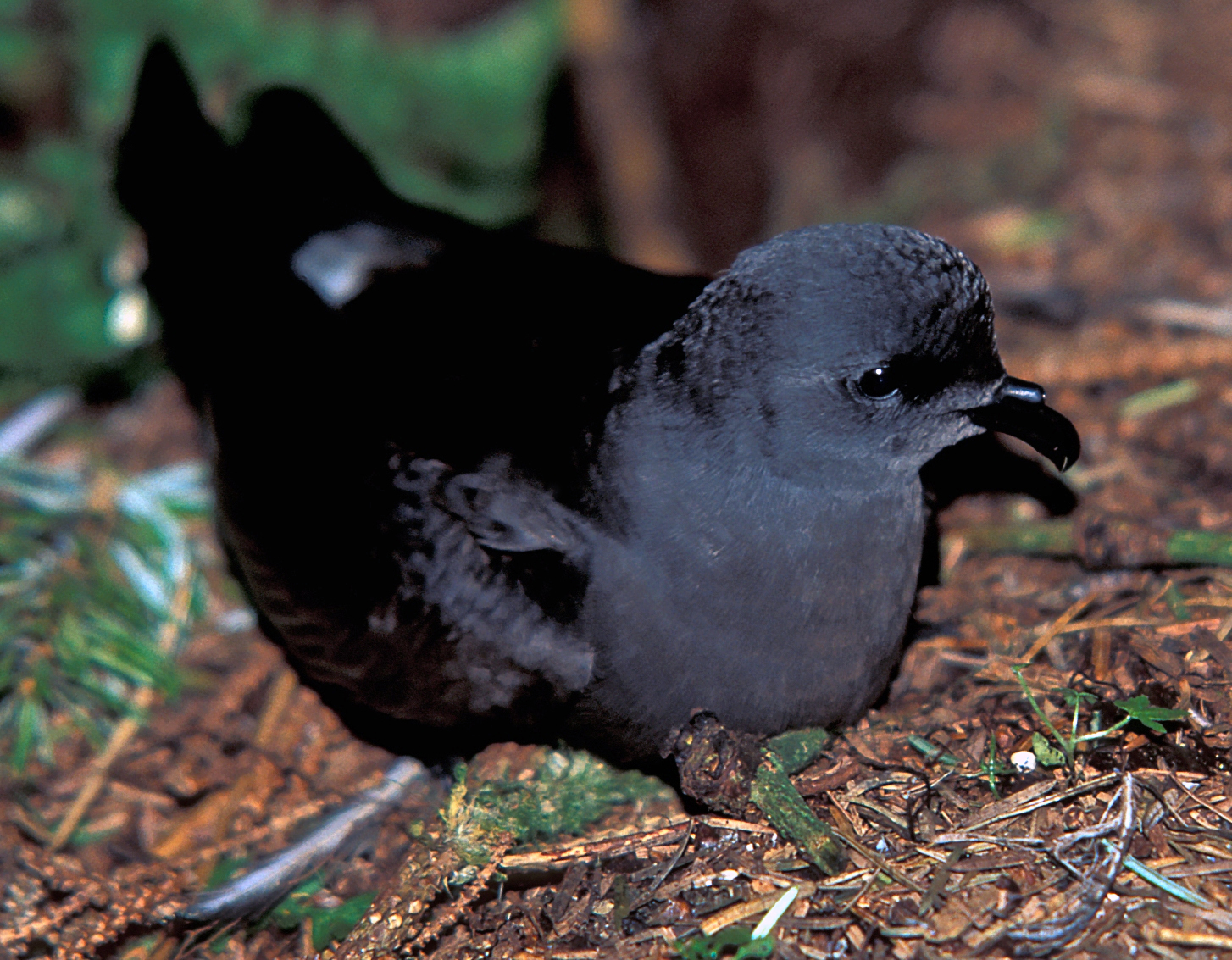
Leach's storm petrel

Order: Procellariiformes Family: Hydrobatidae

Though the members of this family are similar in many respects to the southern storm-petrels, including their general appearance and habits, there are enough genetic differences to warrant their placement in a separate family.

- European storm-petrel, Hydrobates pelagicus (A) LC
- Leach's storm-petrel, Hydrobates leucorhous VU

== Shearwaters and petrels ==
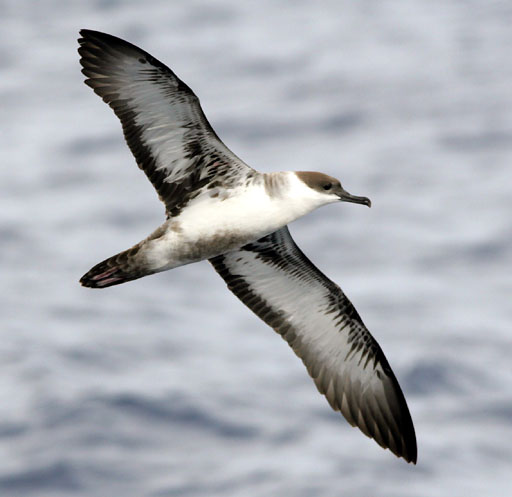
Great shearwater

Order: Procellariiformes Family: Procellariidae

The procellariids are the main group of medium-sized "true petrels", characterised by united nostrils with medium septum and a long outer functional primary.

- Cory's shearwater, Calonectris diomedea LC
- Great shearwater, Ardenna gravis LC
- Sooty shearwater, Ardenna griseus NT
- Yelkouan shearwater, Puffinus yelkouan VU
- Balearic shearwater, Puffinus mauretanicus CR

== Storks ==
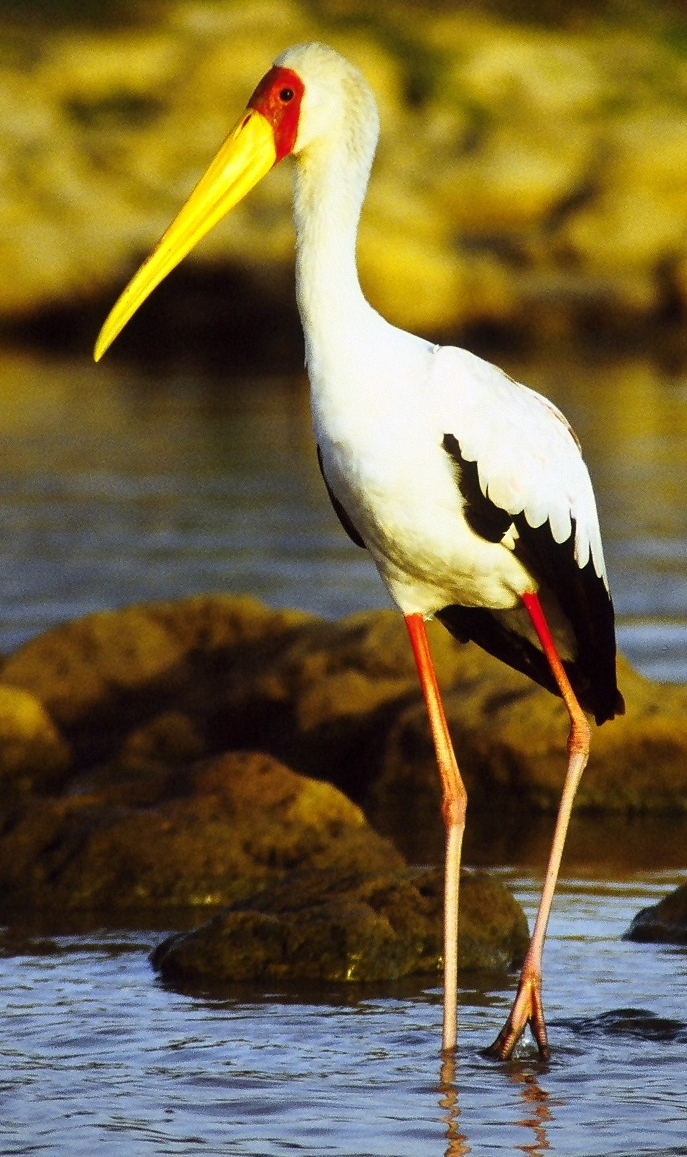
Yellow-billed stork

Order: Ciconiiformes Family: Ciconiidae

Storks are large, long-legged, long-necked, wading birds with long, stout bills. Storks are mute, but bill-clattering is an important mode of communication at the nest. Their nests can be large and may be reused for many years. Many species are migratory.

- Black stork, Ciconia nigra LC
- White stork, Ciconia ciconia LC
- Yellow-billed stork, Mycteria ibis LC

== Boobies and gannets ==
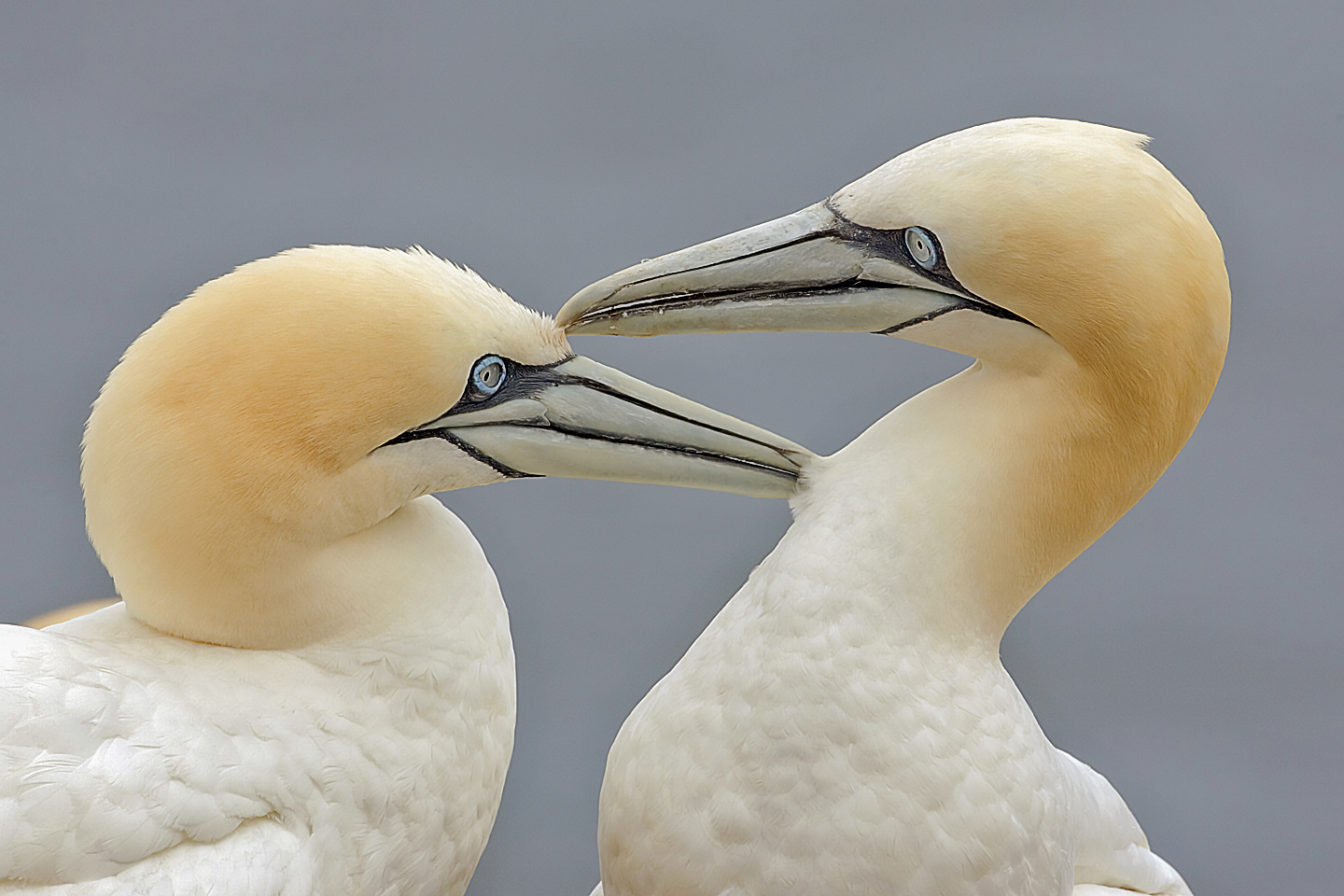
Northern gannet

Order: Suliformes Family: Sulidae

The sulids comprise the gannets and boobies. Both groups are medium to large coastal seabirds that plunge-dive for fish.

- Northern gannet, Morus bassanus LC

== Cormorants and shags ==
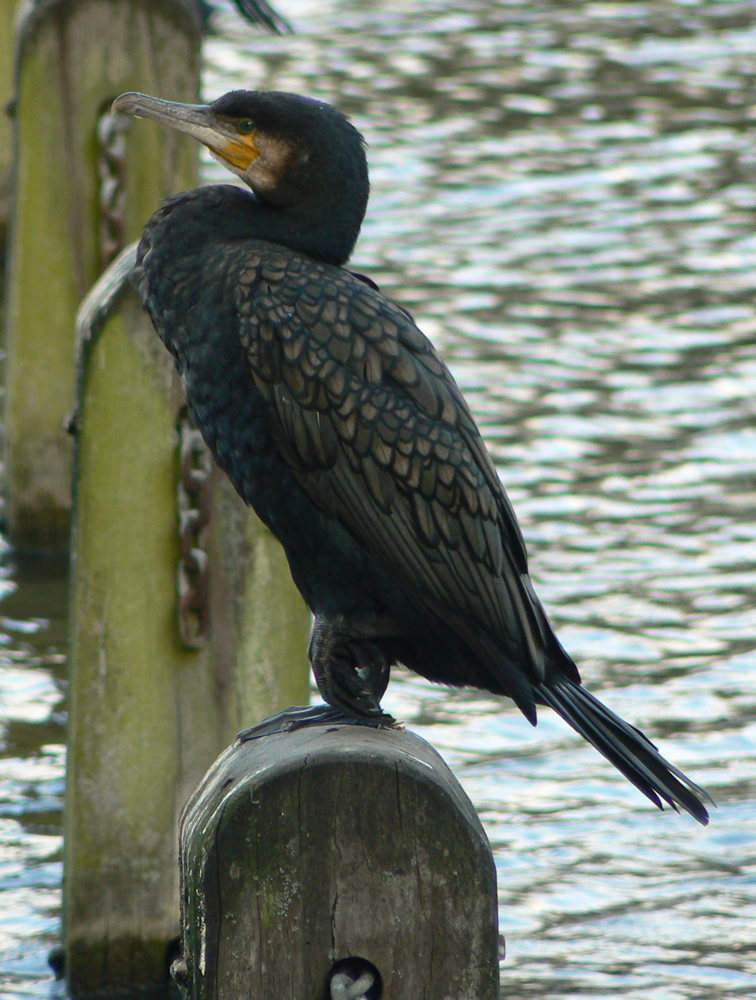
Great cormorant

Order: Suliformes Family: Phalacrocoracidae

Phalacrocoracidae is a family of medium to large coastal, fish-eating seabirds that includes cormorants and shags. Plumage colouration varies, with the majority having mainly dark plumage, some species being black-and-white and a few being colourful.

- Pygmy cormorant, Microcarbo pygmeus LC
- Great cormorant, Phalacrocorax carbo LC
- European shag, Gulosus aristotelis LC

== Pelicans ==
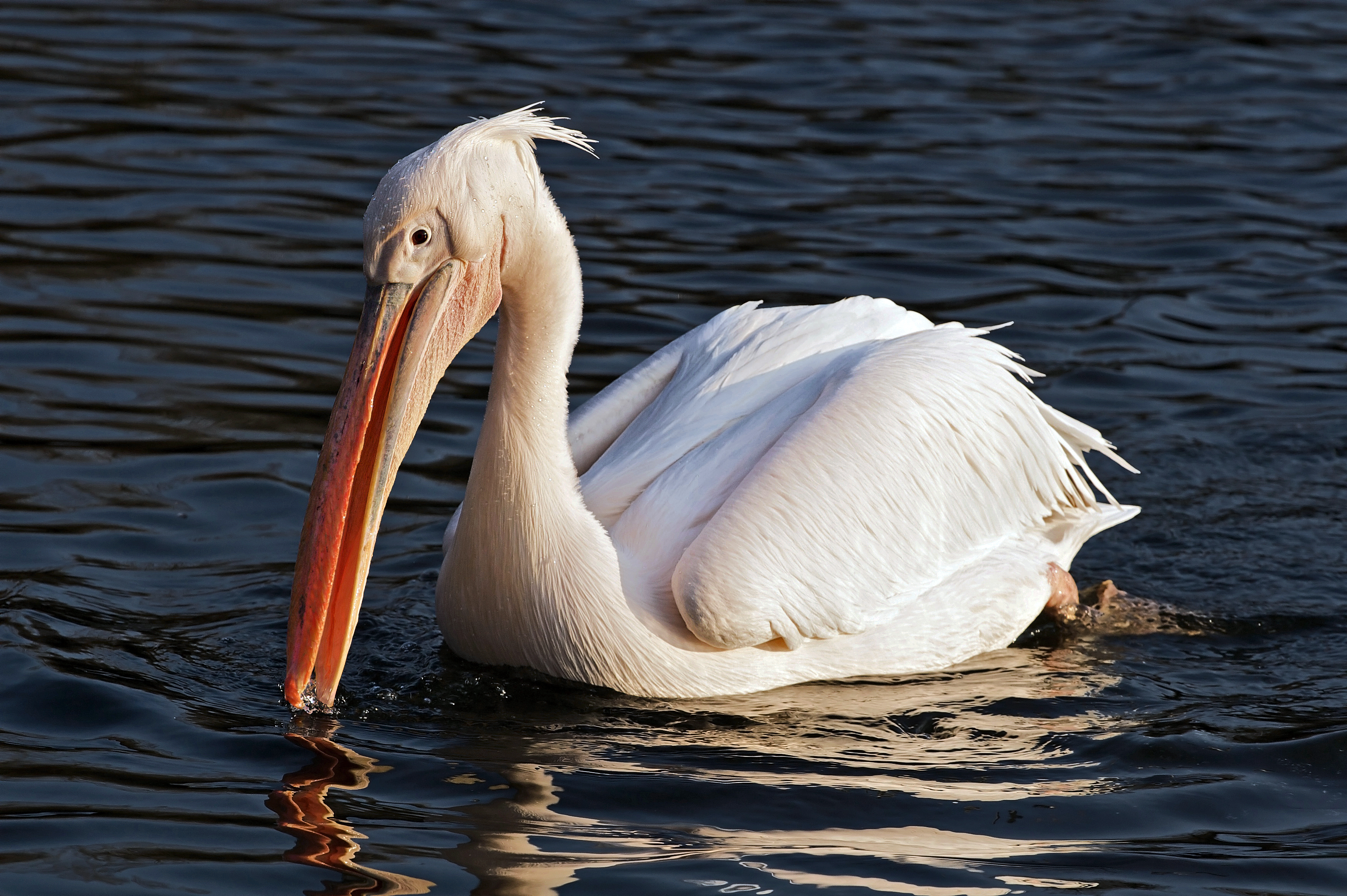
Great white pelican

Order: Pelecaniformes Family: Pelecanidae

Pelicans are large water birds with a distinctive pouch under their beak. As with other members of the order Pelecaniformes, they have webbed feet with four toes.

- Great white pelican, Pelecanus onocrotalus LC
- Dalmatian pelican, Pelecanus crispus NT

== Herons, egrets, and bitterns ==
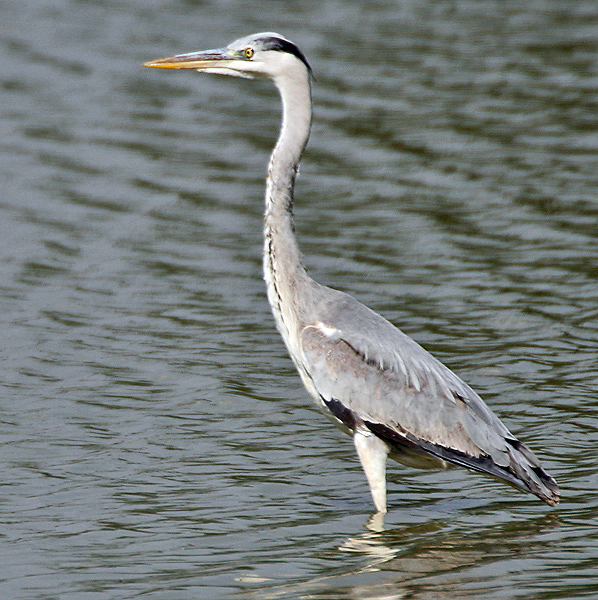
Grey heron

Order: Pelecaniformes Family: Ardeidae

The family Ardeidae contains the bitterns, herons and egrets. Herons and egrets are medium to large wading birds with long necks and legs. Bitterns tend to be shorter necked and more wary. Members of Ardeidae fly with their necks retracted, unlike other long-necked birds such as storks, ibises and spoonbills.

- Great bittern, Botaurus stellaris LC
- Little bittern, Ixobrychus minutus LC
- Gray heron, Ardea cinerea LC
- Black-headed heron, Ardea melanocephala (A) LC
- Purple heron, Ardea purpurea LC
- Great egret, Ardea alba LC
- Little egret, Egretta garzetta LC
- Western reef-heron, Egretta gularis (A) LC
- Cattle egret, Bubulcus ibis LC
- Squacco heron, Ardeola ralloides LC
- Black-crowned night-heron, Nycticorax nycticorax LC

== Ibises and spoonbills ==
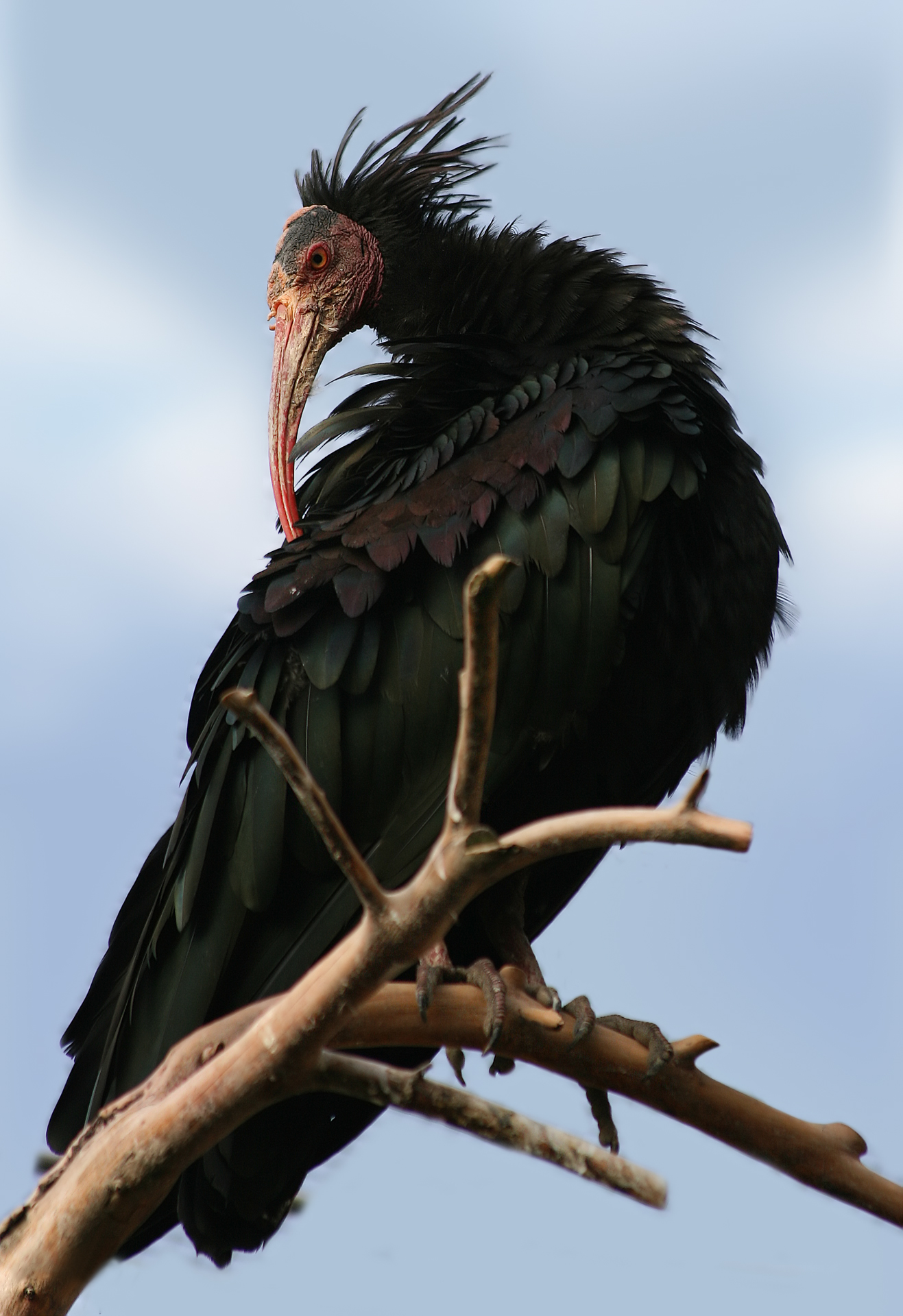
Waldrapp or northern bald ibis

Order: Pelecaniformes Family: Threskiornithidae

Threskiornithidae is a family of large terrestrial and wading birds which includes the ibises and spoonbills. They have long, broad wings with 11 primary and about 20 secondary feathers. They are strong fliers and despite their size and weight, very capable soarers.

- Glossy ibis, Plegadis falcinellus LC
- Northern bald ibis, Geronticus eremita (Ex) EN
- Eurasian spoonbill, Platalea leucorodia LC

== Osprey ==
Order: Accipitriformes Family: Pandionidae

The family Pandionidae contains only one species, the osprey. The osprey is a medium-large raptor which is a specialist fish-eater with a worldwide distribution.

- Osprey, Pandion haliaetus LC

== Hawks, eagles, and kites ==
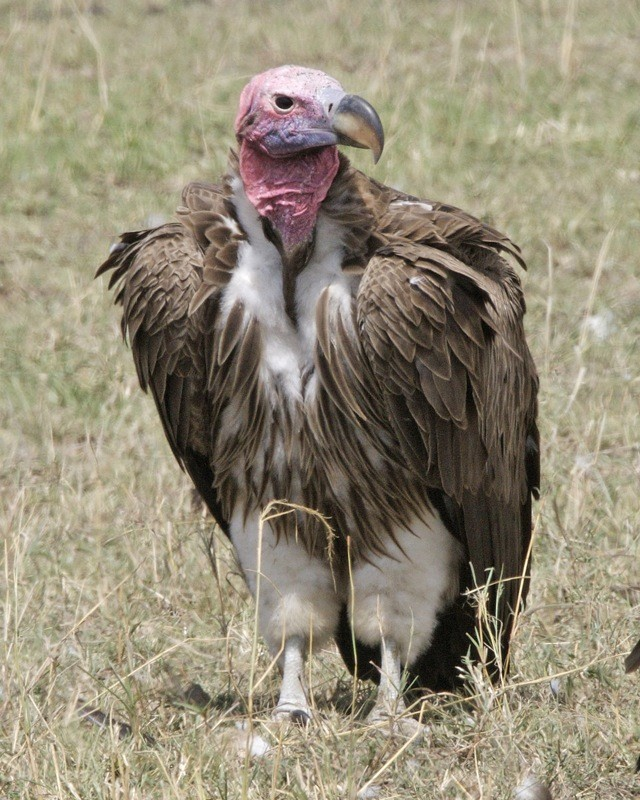
Lappet-faced vulture

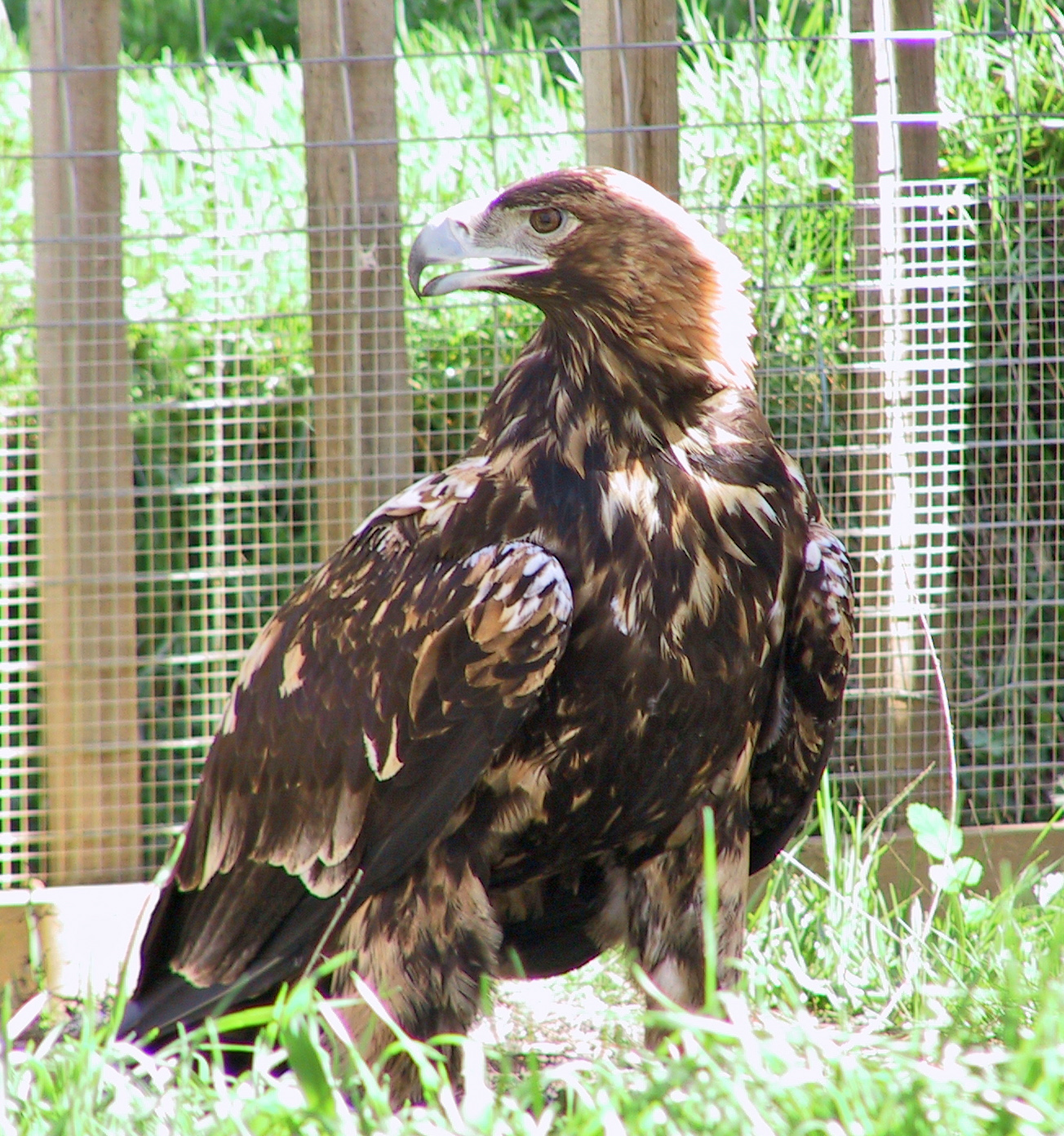
The Spanish imperial eagle, now mostly extirpated from Algeria

Order: Accipitriformes Family: Accipitridae

Accipitridae is a family of birds of prey, which includes hawks, eagles, kites, harriers and Old World vultures. These birds have powerful hooked beaks for tearing flesh from their prey, strong legs, powerful talons and keen eyesight.

- Black-winged kite, Elanus caeruleus LC
- Bearded vulture, Gypaetus barbatus NT
- Egyptian vulture, Neophron percnopterus EN
- European honey-buzzard, Pernis apivorus LC
- Cinereous vulture, Aegypius monachus (A) NT
- Lappet-faced vulture, Torgos tracheliotos EN
- Eurasian griffon, Gyps fulvus LC
- Short-toed snake eagle, Circaetus gallicus LC
- Lesser spotted eagle, Clanga pomarina LC
- Greater spotted eagle, Clanga clanga (A) VU
- Booted eagle, Hieraaetus pennatus LC
- Tawny eagle, Aquila rapax VU
- Spanish eagle, Aquila adalberti (Ex) VU
- Imperial eagle, Aquila heliaca VU
- Golden eagle, Aquila chrysaetos LC
- Verreaux's eagle, Aquila verreauxii (A) LC
- Bonelli's eagle, Aquila fasciata LC
- Eurasian marsh-harrier, Circus aeruginosus LC
- Hen harrier, Circus cyaneus LC
- Pallid harrier, Circus macrourus NT
- Montagu's harrier, Circus pygargus LC
- Eurasian sparrowhawk, Accipiter nisus LC
- Northern goshawk, Accipiter gentilis LC
- Red kite, Milvus milvus LC
- Black kite, Milvus migrans LC
- White-tailed eagle, Haliaeetus albicilla (A)(Ex) LC
- Common buzzard, Buteo buteo LC
- Long-legged buzzard, Buteo rufinus LC

== Barn-owls ==
Order: Strigiformes Family: Tytonidae

Barn-owls are medium to large owls with large heads and characteristic heart-shaped faces. They have long strong legs with powerful talons.

- Western barn owl, Tyto alba LC

== Owls ==
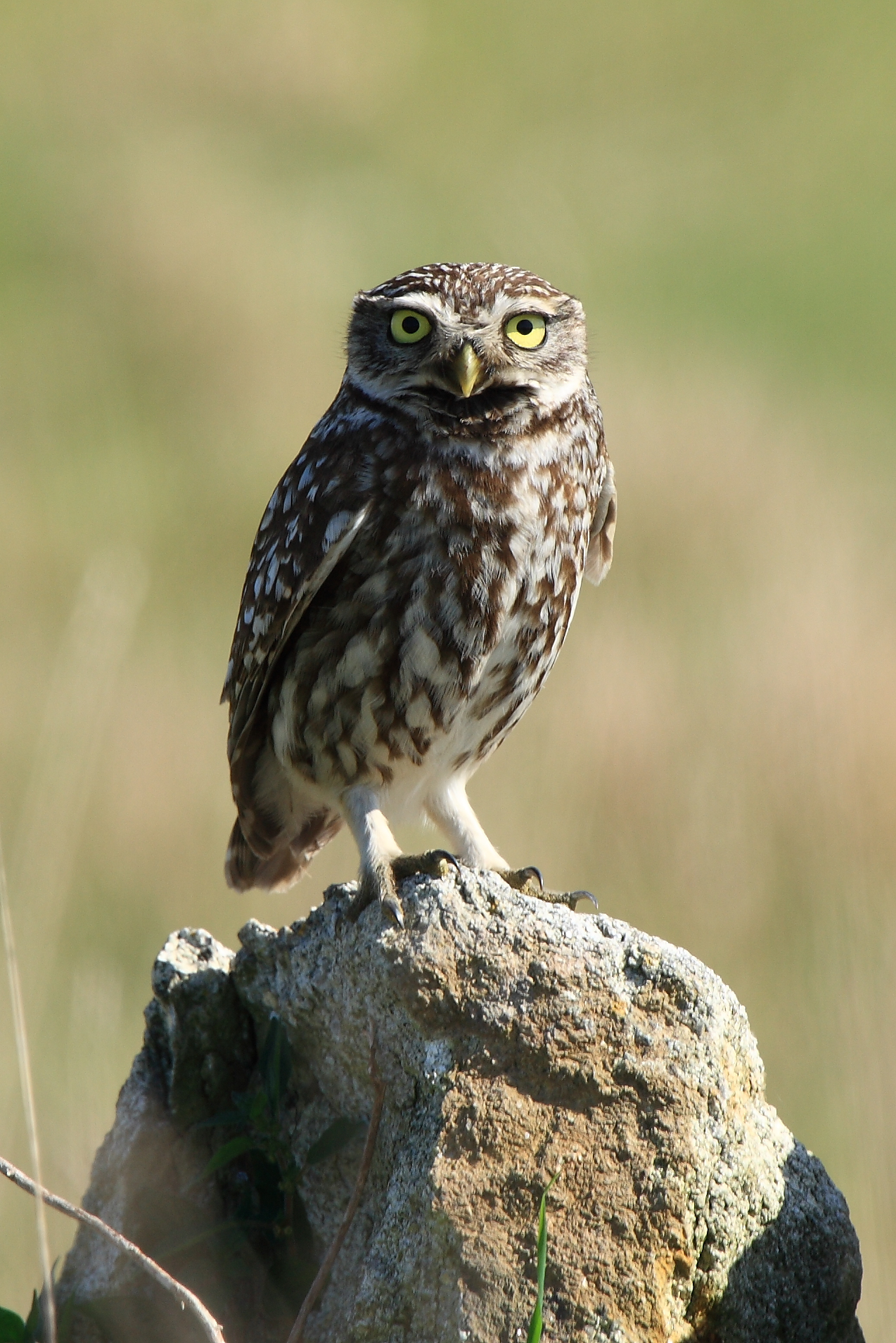
Little owl

Order: Strigiformes Family: Strigidae

The typical owls are small to large solitary nocturnal birds of prey. They have large forward-facing eyes and ears, a hawk-like beak and a conspicuous circle of feathers around each eye called a facial disk.

- Eurasian scops-owl, Otus scops LC
- Eurasian eagle-owl, Bubo bubo LC
- Pharaoh eagle-owl, Bubo ascalaphus LC
- Little owl, Athene noctua LC
- Tawny owl, Strix aluco (A) LC
- Maghreb owl, Strix mauritanica NE
- Long-eared owl, Asio otus LC
- Short-eared owl, Asio flammeus LC
- Marsh owl, Asio capensis (Ex) LC

== Mousebirds ==
Order: Coliiformes Family: Coliidae

The mousebirds are slender grayish or brown birds with soft, hairlike body feathers and very long thin tails. They are arboreal and scurry through the leaves like rodents in search of berries, fruit, and buds. They are acrobatic and can feed upside down. All species have strong claws and reversible outer toes. They also have crests and stubby bills.

- Blue-naped mousebird, Urocolius macrourus (A) LC

== Hoopoes ==
Order: Bucerotiformes Family: Upupidae

Hoopoes have black, white and orangey-pink colouring with a large erectile crest on their head.

- Eurasian hoopoe, Upupa epops LC

== Kingfishers ==
Order: Coraciiformes Family: Alcedinidae

Kingfishers are medium-sized birds with large heads, long, pointed bills, short legs and stubby tails.

- Common kingfisher, Alcedo atthis LC

== Bee-eaters ==
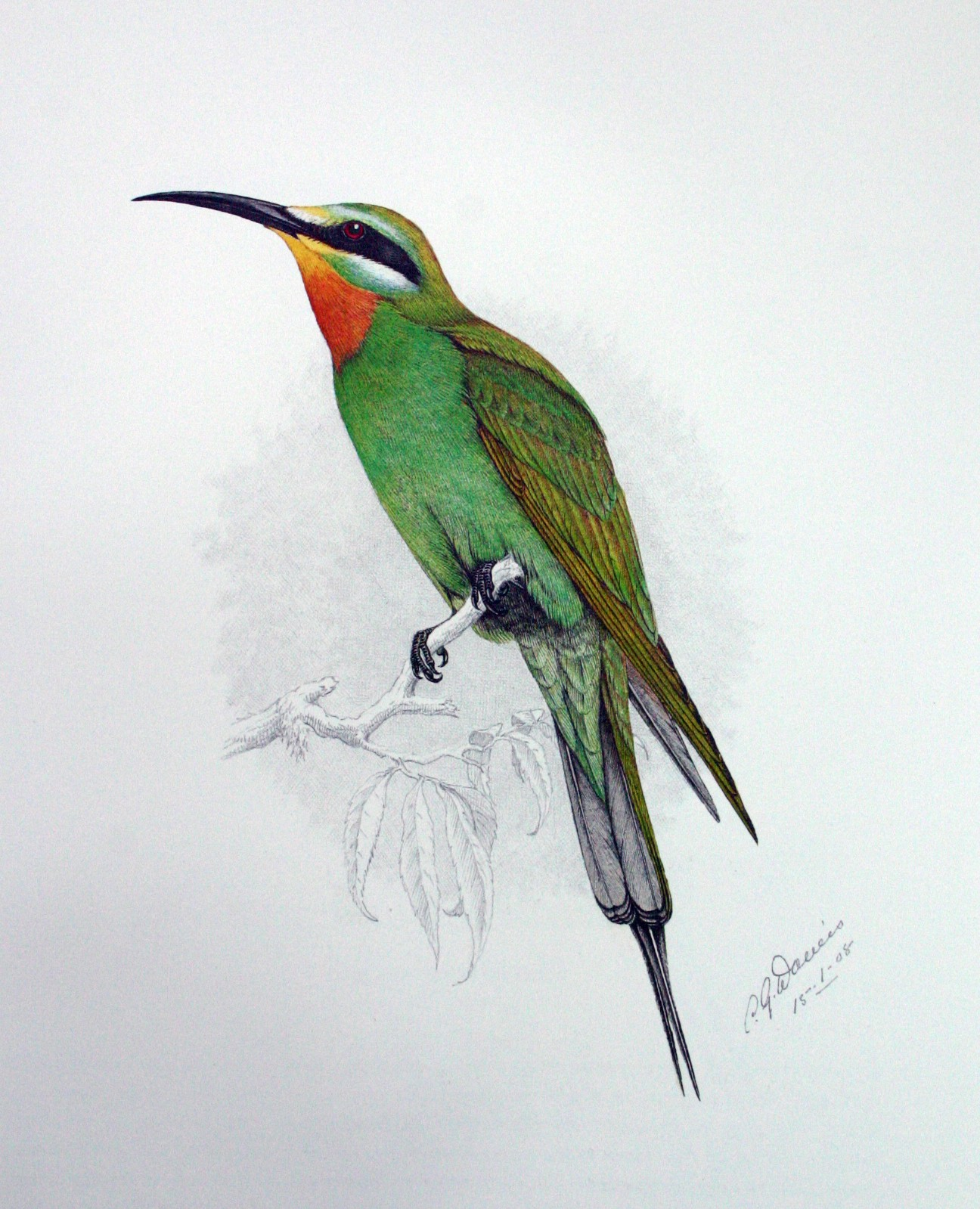
Blue-cheeked bee-eater

Order: Coraciiformes Family: Meropidae

The bee-eaters are a group of coraciiform birds in the family Meropidae. Most species are found in Africa but others occur in southern Europe, Madagascar, Australia and New Guinea. They are characterised by richly coloured plumage, slender bodies and usually elongated central tail feathers. All are colourful and have long downturned bills and pointed wings, which give them a swallow-like appearance when seen from afar.

- White-throated bee-eater, Merops albicollis (A) LC
- Blue-cheeked bee-eater, Merops persicus LC
- European bee-eater, Merops apiaster LC

== Rollers ==
Order: Coraciiformes Family: Coraciidae

Rollers resemble crows in size and build, but are more closely related to the kingfishers and bee-eaters. They share the colourful appearance of those groups with blues and browns predominating. The two inner front toes are connected, but the outer toe is not.

- European roller, Coracias garrulus LC

== Woodpeckers ==
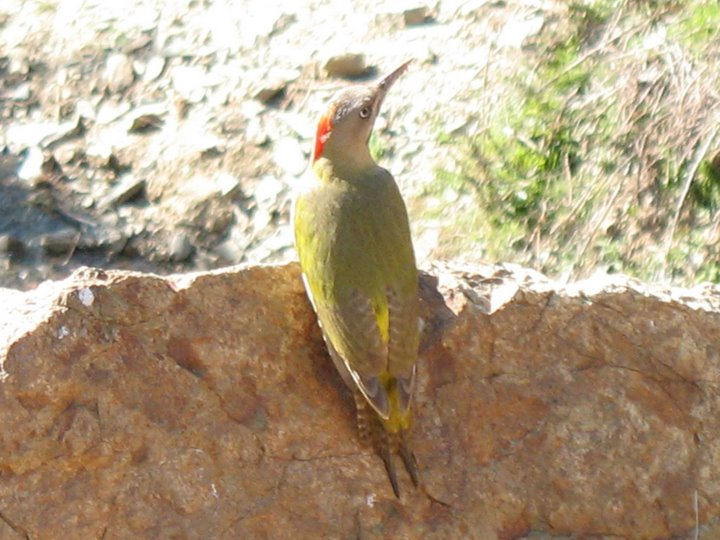
A Levaillant's woodpecker found only in North Africa

Order: Piciformes Family: Picidae

Woodpeckers are small to medium-sized birds with chisel-like beaks, short legs, stiff tails and long tongues used for capturing insects. Some species have feet with two toes pointing forward and two backward, while several species have only three toes. Many woodpeckers have the habit of tapping noisily on tree trunks with their beaks.

- Eurasian wryneck, Jynx torquilla LC
- African grey woodpecker, Chloropicus goertae (A) LC
- Great spotted woodpecker, Dendrocopos major LC
- Lesser spotted woodpecker, Dryobates minor LC
- Levaillant's woodpecker, Picus vaillantii LC

== Falcons and caracaras ==
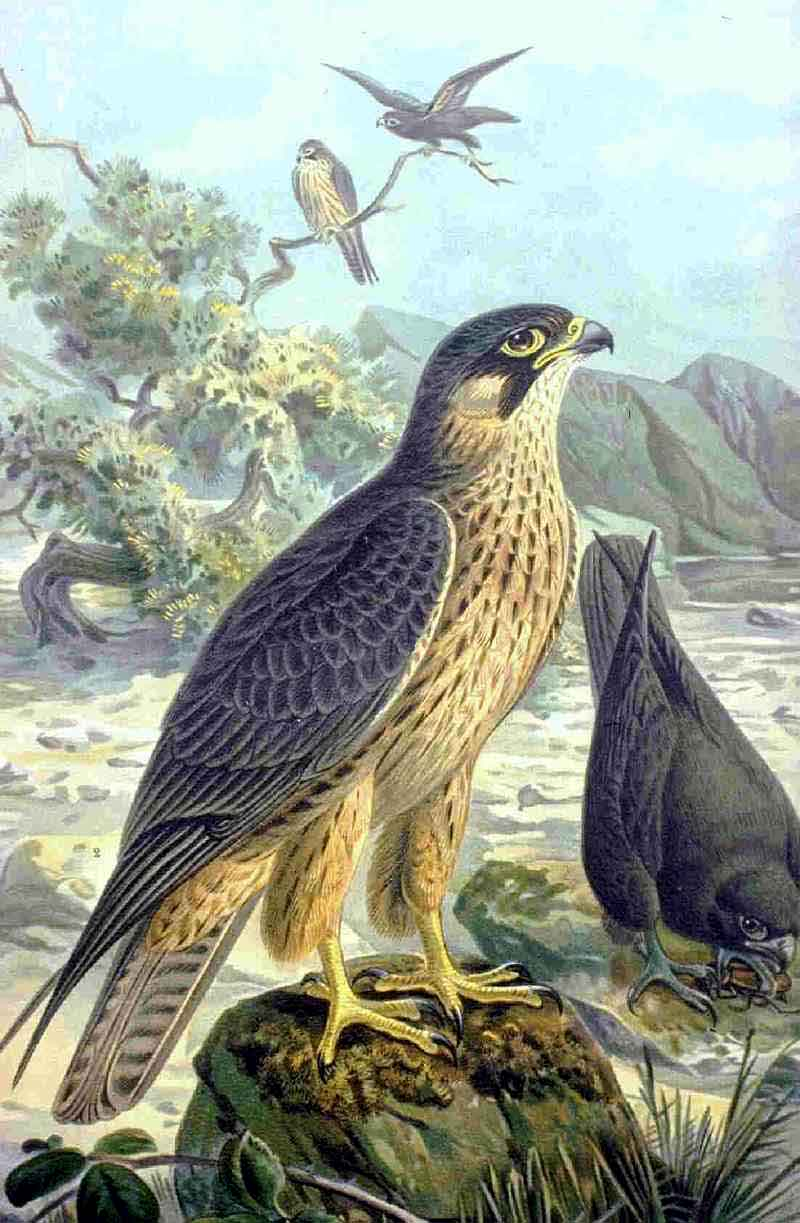
Eleonora's falcon illustration by Naumann

Order: Falconiformes Family: Falconidae

Falconidae is a family of diurnal birds of prey. They differ from hawks, eagles and kites in that they kill with their beaks instead of their talons.

- Lesser kestrel, Falco naumanni LC
- Eurasian kestrel, Falco tinnunculus LC
- Red-footed falcon, Falco vespertinus (A) VU
- Eleonora's falcon, Falco eleonorae LC
- Sooty falcon, Falco concolor (A) VU
- Merlin, Falco columbarius LC
- Eurasian hobby, Falco subbuteo LC
- Lanner falcon, Falco biarmicus LC
- Peregrine falcon, Falco peregrinus LC
  - Barbary falcon, Falco peregrinus pelegrinoides NE

== Old World parrots ==
Order: Psittaciformes Family: Psittaculidae

Characteristic features of parrots include a strong curved bill, an upright stance, strong legs, and clawed zygodactyl feet. Many parrots are vividly colored, and some are multi-colored. In size they range from 8 cm (3.1 in) to 1 m (3.3 ft) in length. Old World parrots are found from Africa east across south and southeast Asia and Oceania to Australia and New Zealand.

- Rose-ringed parakeet, Psittacula krameri (I) LC

== African and New World parrots ==
Order: Psittaciformes Family: Psittacidae

Most of the more than 150 species in this family are found in the New World.

- Dusky parrot, Pionus fuscus (A) LC

== Old World orioles ==
Order: Passeriformes Family: Oriolidae

The Old World orioles are colourful passerine birds. They are not related to the New World orioles.

- Eurasian golden oriole, Oriolus oriolus LC

== Bushshrikes and allies ==
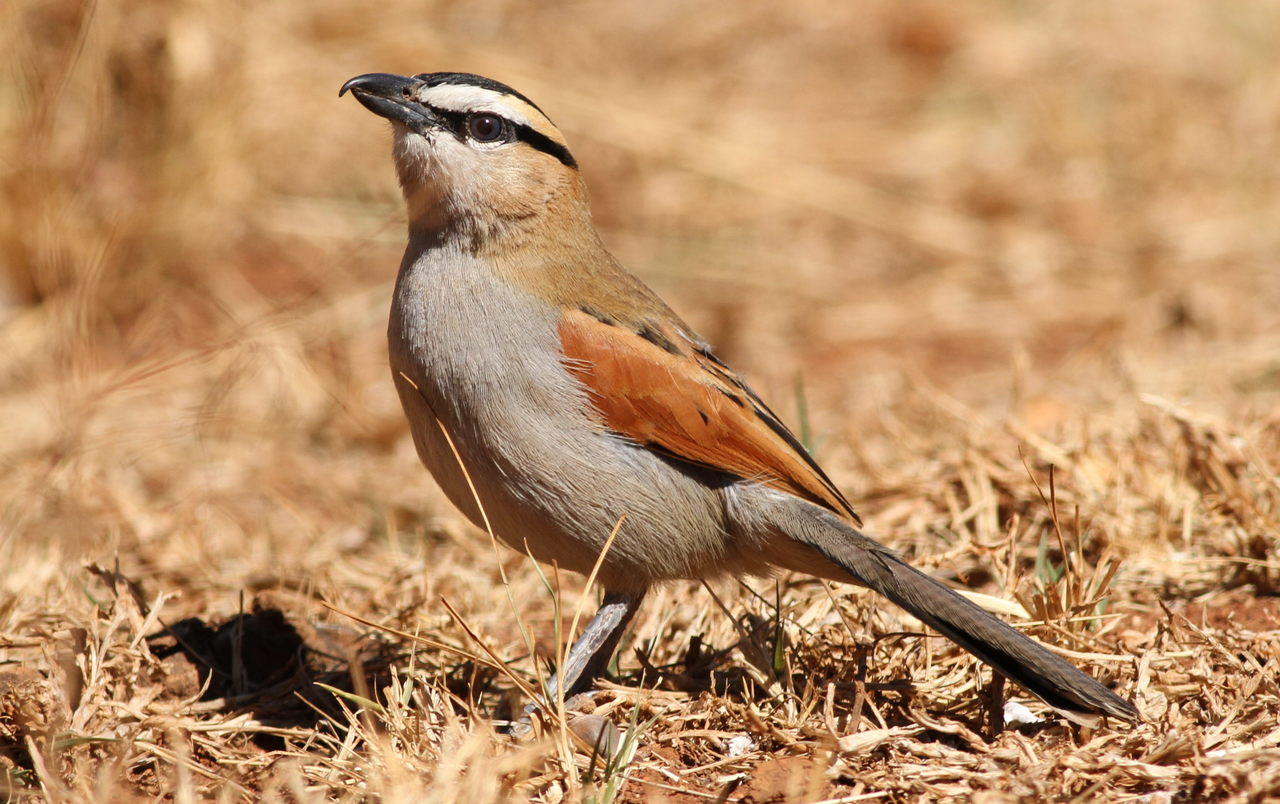
Black-crowned tchagra

Order: Passeriformes Family: Malaconotidae

Bushshrikes are similar in habits to shrikes, hunting insects and other small prey from a perch on a bush. Although similar in build to the shrikes, these tend to be either colourful species or largely black; some species are quite secretive.

- Black-crowned tchagra, Tchagra senegalus LC

== Shrikes ==
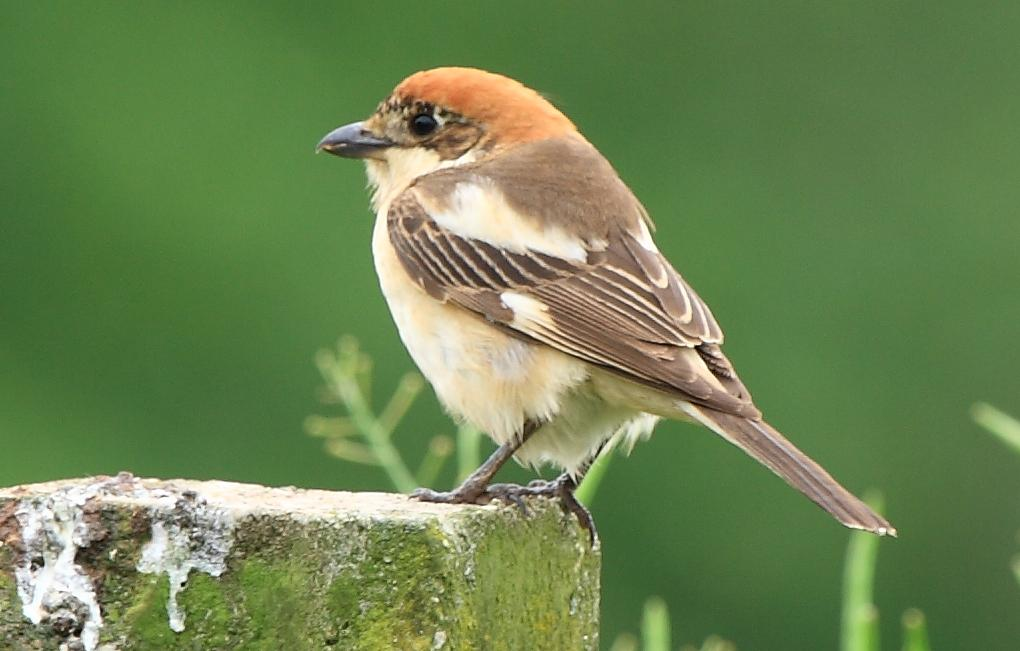
Woodchat shrike

Order: Passeriformes Family: Laniidae

Shrikes are passerine birds known for their habit of catching other birds and small animals and impaling the uneaten portions of their bodies on thorns. A typical shrike's beak is hooked, like a bird of prey.

- Red-backed shrike, Lanius collurio (A) LC
- Red-tailed shrike, Lanius phoenicuroides LC
- Great gray shrike, Lanius excubitor LC
- Masked shrike, Lanius nubicus (A) LC
- Woodchat shrike, Lanius senator NT

== Crows, jays, and magpies ==
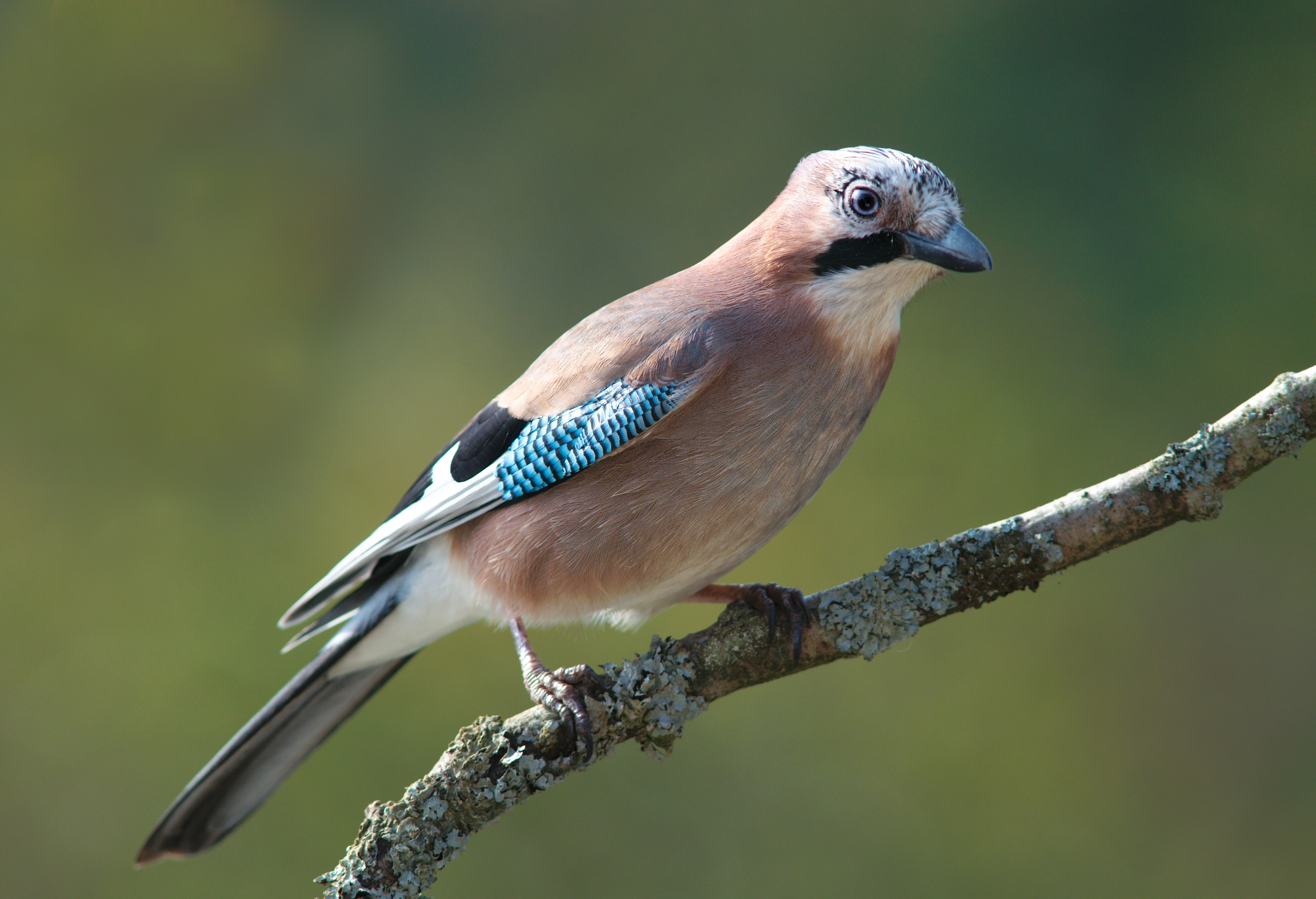
Eurasian jay

Order: Passeriformes Family: Corvidae

The family Corvidae includes crows, ravens, jays, choughs, magpies, treepies, nutcrackers and ground jays. Corvids are above average in size among the Passeriformes, and some of the larger species show high levels of intelligence.

- Eurasian jay, Garrulus glandarius LC
- Maghreb magpie, Pica mauritanica LC
- Eurasian magpie, Pica pica LC
- Red-billed chough, Pyrrhocorax pyrrhocorax LC
- Eurasian jackdaw, Corvus monedula LC
- Rook, Corvus frugilegus (A) LC
- Carrion crow, Corvus corone LC
- Pied crow, Corvus albus (A) LC
- Brown-necked raven, Corvus ruficollis LC
- Common raven, Corvus corax LC

== Tits, chickadees, and titmice ==
Order: Passeriformes Family: Paridae

The Paridae are mainly small stocky woodland species with short stout bills. Some have crests. They are adaptable birds, with a mixed diet including seeds and insects.

- Coal tit, Periparus ater LC
- African blue tit, Cyanistes teneriffae LC
- Great tit, Parus major LC

== Penduline-tits ==
Order: Passeriformes Family: Remizidae

The penduline-tits are a group of small passerine birds related to the true tits. They are insectivores.

- Eurasian penduline-tit, Remiz pendulinus (A) LC

== Larks ==
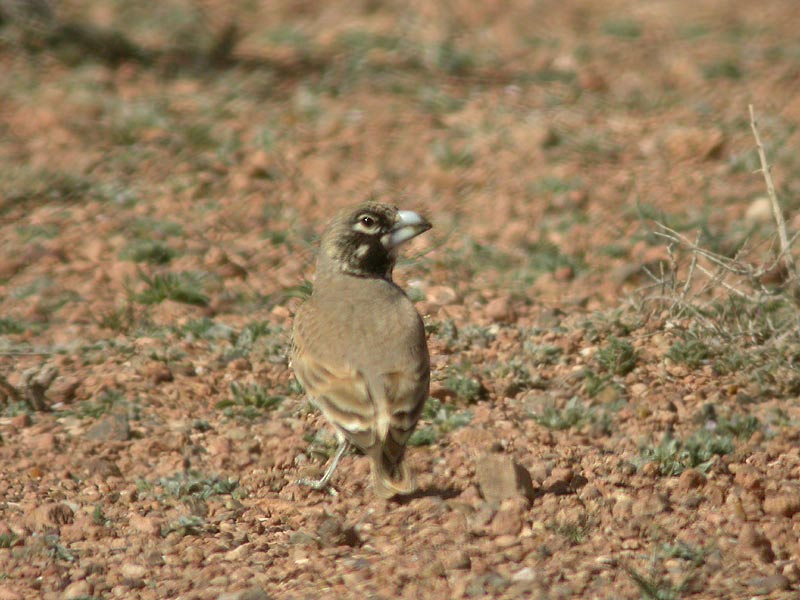
Thick-billed lark

Order: Passeriformes Family: Alaudidae

Larks are small terrestrial birds with often extravagant songs and display flights. Most larks are fairly dull in appearance. Their food is insects and seeds.

- Greater hoopoe-lark, Alaemon alaudipes LC
- Thick-billed lark, Ramphocoris clotbey LC
- Bar-tailed lark, Ammomanes cincturus LC
- Desert lark, Ammomanes deserti LC
- Black-crowned sparrow-lark, Eremopterix nigriceps (A) LC
- Horned lark, Eremophila alpestris (A) LC
- Temminck's lark, Eremophila bilopha LC
- Greater short-toed lark, Calandrella brachydactyla LC
- Calandra lark, Melanocorypha calandra LC
- Dupont's lark, Chersophilus duponti VU
- Dunn's lark, Eremalauda dunni (A) LC
- Mediterranean short-toed lark, Alaudala rufescens LC
- Wood lark, Lullula arborea LC
- Eurasian skylark, Alauda arvensis LC
- Thekla's lark, Galerida theklae LC
- Crested lark, Galerida cristata LC

== Bearded reedling ==
Order: Passeriformes Family: Panuridae

This species, the only one in its family, is found in reed beds throughout temperate Europe and Asia.

- Bearded reedling, Panurus biarmicus LC

== Cisticolas and allies ==
Order: Passeriformes Family: Cisticolidae

The Cisticolidae are warblers found mainly in warmer southern regions of the Old World. They are generally very small birds of drab brown or grey appearance found in open country such as grassland or scrub.

- Zitting cisticola, Cisticola juncidis LC

== Reed warblers and allies ==
Order: Passeriformes Family: Acrocephalidae

The members of this family are usually rather large for "warblers". Most are rather plain olivaceous brown above with much yellow to beige below. They are usually found in open woodland, reedbeds, or tall grass. The family occurs mostly in southern to western Eurasia and surroundings, but it also ranges far into the Pacific, with some species in Africa.

- Eastern olivaceous warbler, Iduna pallida LC
- Western olivaceous warbler, Iduna opaca LC
- Olive-tree warbler, Hippolais olivetorum LC
- Melodious warbler, Hippolais polyglotta LC
- Icterine warbler, Hippolais icterina LC
- Aquatic warbler, Acrocephalus paludicola VU
- Moustached warbler, Acrocephalus melanopogon LC
- Sedge warbler, Acrocephalus schoenobaenus LC
- Marsh warbler, Acrocephalus palustris LC
- Common reed warbler, Acrocephalus scirpaceus LC
- Great reed warbler, Acrocephalus arundinaceus LC

== Grassbirds and allies ==
Order: Passeriformes Family: Locustellidae

Locustellidae are a family of small insectivorous songbirds found mainly in Eurasia, Africa, and the Australian region. They are smallish birds with tails that are usually long and pointed, and tend to be drab brownish or buffy all over.

- River warbler, Locustella fluviatilis LC
- Savi's warbler, Locustella luscinioides LC
- Common grasshopper-warbler, Locustella naevia LC

== Swallows ==
Order: Passeriformes Family: Hirundinidae

The family Hirundinidae is adapted to aerial feeding. They have a slender streamlined body, long pointed wings and a short bill with a wide gape. The feet are adapted to perching rather than walking, and the front toes are partially joined at the base.

- Plain martin, Riparia paludicola (A) LC
- Bank swallow, Riparia riparia LC
- Eurasian crag-martin, Ptyonoprogne rupestris LC
- Rock martin, Ptyonoprogne fuligula LC
- Barn swallow, Hirundo rustica LC
- Red-rumped swallow, Cecropis daurica LC
- Common house-martin, Delichon urbicum LC

== Bulbuls ==
Order: Passeriformes Family: Pycnonotidae

Bulbuls are medium-sized songbirds. Some are colourful with yellow, red or orange vents, cheeks, throats or supercilia, but most are drab, with uniform olive-brown to black plumage. Some species have distinct crests.

- Common bulbul, Pycnonotus barbatus LC

== Leaf warblers ==
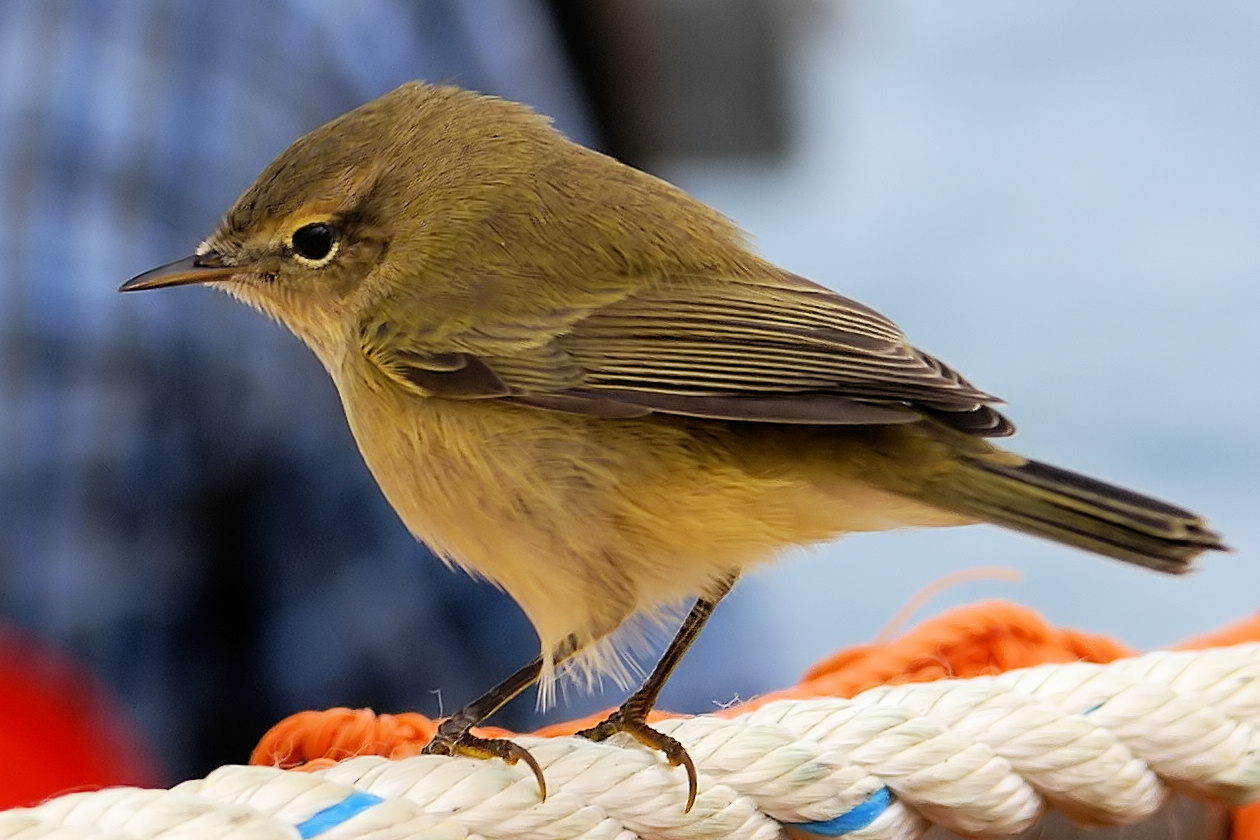
Common chiffchaff winters in Algeria

Order: Passeriformes Family: Phylloscopidae

Leaf warblers are a family of small insectivorous birds found mostly in Eurasia and ranging into Wallacea and Africa. The species are of various sizes, often green-plumaged above and yellow below, or more subdued with grayish-green to grayish-brown colors.

- Wood warbler, Phylloscopus sibilatrix LC
- Western Bonelli's warbler, Phylloscopus bonelli LC
- Yellow-browed warbler, Phylloscopus inornatus (A) LC
- Willow warbler, Phylloscopus trochilus LC
- Common chiffchaff, Phylloscopus collybita LC
- Iberian chiffchaff, Phylloscopus ibericus LC

== Bush warblers and allies ==
Order: Passeriformes Family: Scotocercidae

The members of this family are found throughout Africa, Asia, and Polynesia. Their taxonomy is in flux, and some authorities place some genera in other families.

- Scrub warbler, Scotocerca inquieta LC
- Cetti's warbler, Cettia cetti LC

== Sylviid warblers, parrotbills, and allies ==
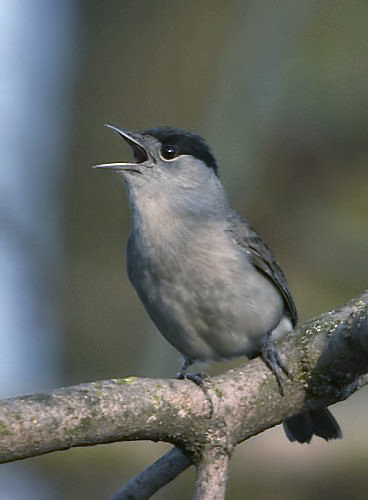
Eurasian blackcap

Order: Passeriformes Family: Sylviidae

The family Sylviidae is a group of small insectivorous passerine birds. They mainly occur as breeding species, as the common name implies, in Europe, Asia and, to a lesser extent, Africa.

- Eurasian blackcap, Sylvia atricapilla LC
- Garden warbler, Sylvia borin LC
- Lesser whitethroat, Curruca curruca LC
- Western Orphean warbler, Curruca hortensis LC
- African desert warbler, Curruca deserti LC
- Tristram's warbler, Curruca deserticola LC
- Rüppell's warbler, Curruca ruppeli (A) LC
- Sardinian warbler, Curruca melanocephala LC
- Moltoni's warbler, Curruca subalpina (A) LC
- Western subalpine warbler, Curruca iberiae NE
- Eastern subalpine warbler, Curruca cantillans LC
- Greater whitethroat, Curruca communis LC
- Spectacled warbler, Curruca conspicillata LC
- Marmora's warbler, Curruca sarda LC
- Dartford warbler, Curruca undata NT

== Laughingthrushes and allies ==
Order: Passeriformes Family: Leiothrichidae

The members of this family are diverse in size and colouration, though those of genus Turdoides tend to be brown or greyish. The family is found in Africa, India, and southeast Asia.

- Fulvous chatterer, Argya fulva LC

== Kinglets ==
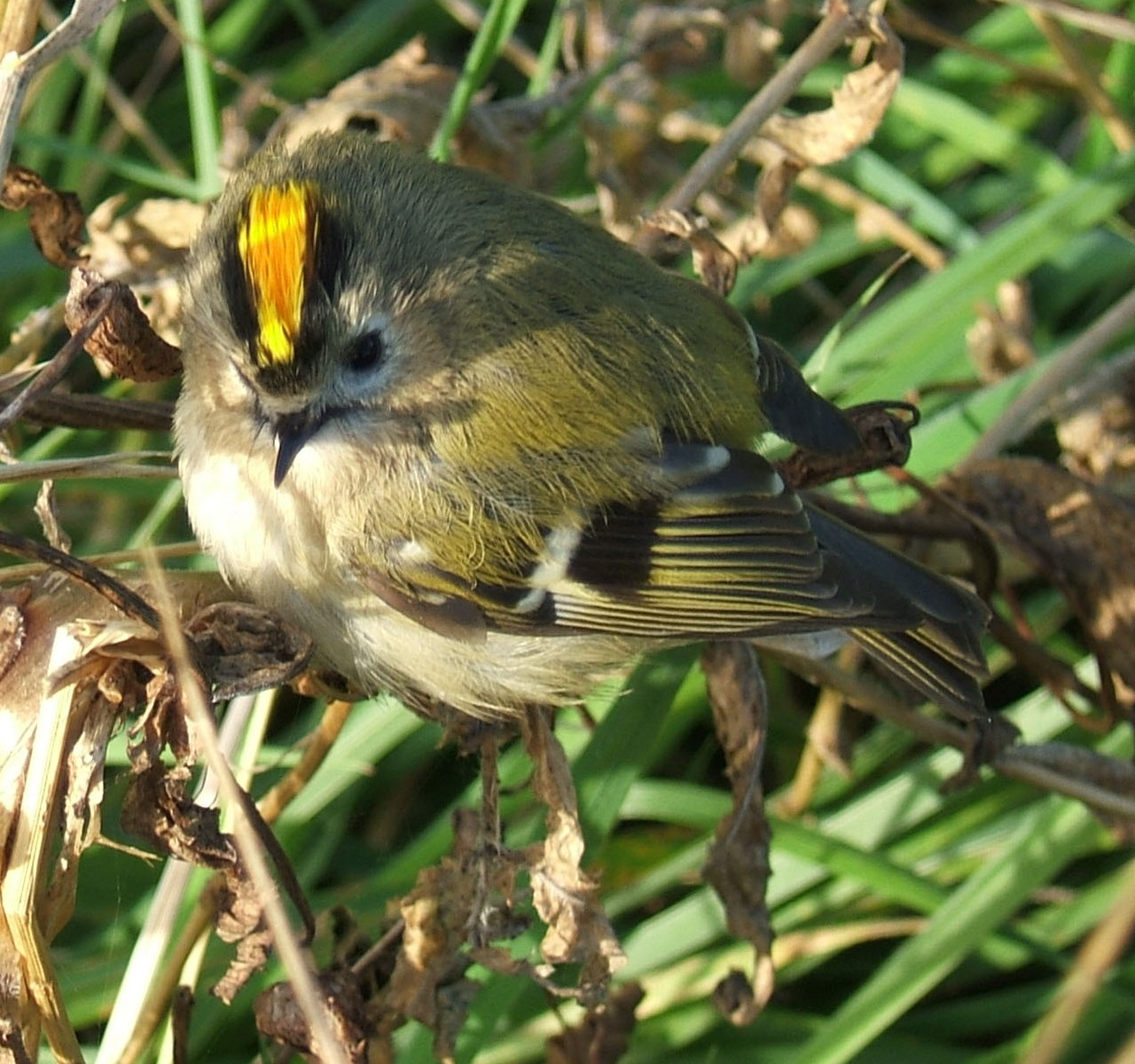
Goldcrest

Order: Passeriformes Family: Regulidae

The kinglets, also called crests, are a small group of birds often included in the Old World warblers, but frequently given family status because they also resemble the titmice.

- Goldcrest, Regulus regulus LC
- Common firecrest, Regulus ignicapillus LC

== Wallcreeper ==
Order: Passeriformes Family: Tichodromidae

The wallcreeper is a small bird related to the nuthatch family, which has stunning crimson, grey and black plumage.

- Wallcreeper, Tichodroma muraria (A) LC

== Nuthatches ==
Algerian nuthatch illustration - This bird is endemic to Algeria

Order: Passeriformes Family: Sittidae

Nuthatches are small woodland birds. They have the unusual ability to climb down trees head first, unlike other birds which can only go upwards. Nuthatches have big heads, short tails and powerful bills and feet.

- Algerian nuthatch, Sitta ledanti (E) EN

== Treecreepers ==
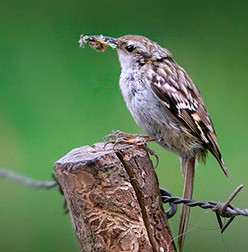
Short-toed treecreeper

Order: Passeriformes Family: Certhiidae

Treecreepers are small woodland birds, brown above and white below. They have thin pointed down-curved bills, which they use to extricate insects from bark. They have stiff tail feathers, like woodpeckers, which they use to support themselves on vertical trees.

- Short-toed treecreeper, Certhia brachydactyla LC

== Wrens ==
Order: Passeriformes Family: Troglodytidae

The wrens are mainly small and inconspicuous except for their loud songs. These birds have short wings and thin down-turned bills. Several species often hold their tails upright. All are insectivorous.

- Eurasian wren, Troglodytes troglodytes LC

== Dippers ==
Order: Passeriformes Family: Cinclidae

Dippers are a group of perching birds whose habitat includes aquatic environments in the Americas, Europe and Asia. They are named for their bobbing or dipping movements.

- White-throated dipper, Cinclus cinclus LC

== Starlings ==
Order: Passeriformes Family: Sturnidae

Starlings are small to medium-sized passerine birds. Their flight is strong and direct and they are very gregarious. Their preferred habitat is fairly open country. They eat insects and fruit. Plumage is typically dark with a metallic sheen.

- European starling, Sturnus vulgaris LC
- Spotless starling, Sturnus unicolor LC
- Rosy starling, Pastor roseus LC
- Chestnut-bellied starling, Lamprotornis pulcher (A) LC

== Thrushes and allies ==
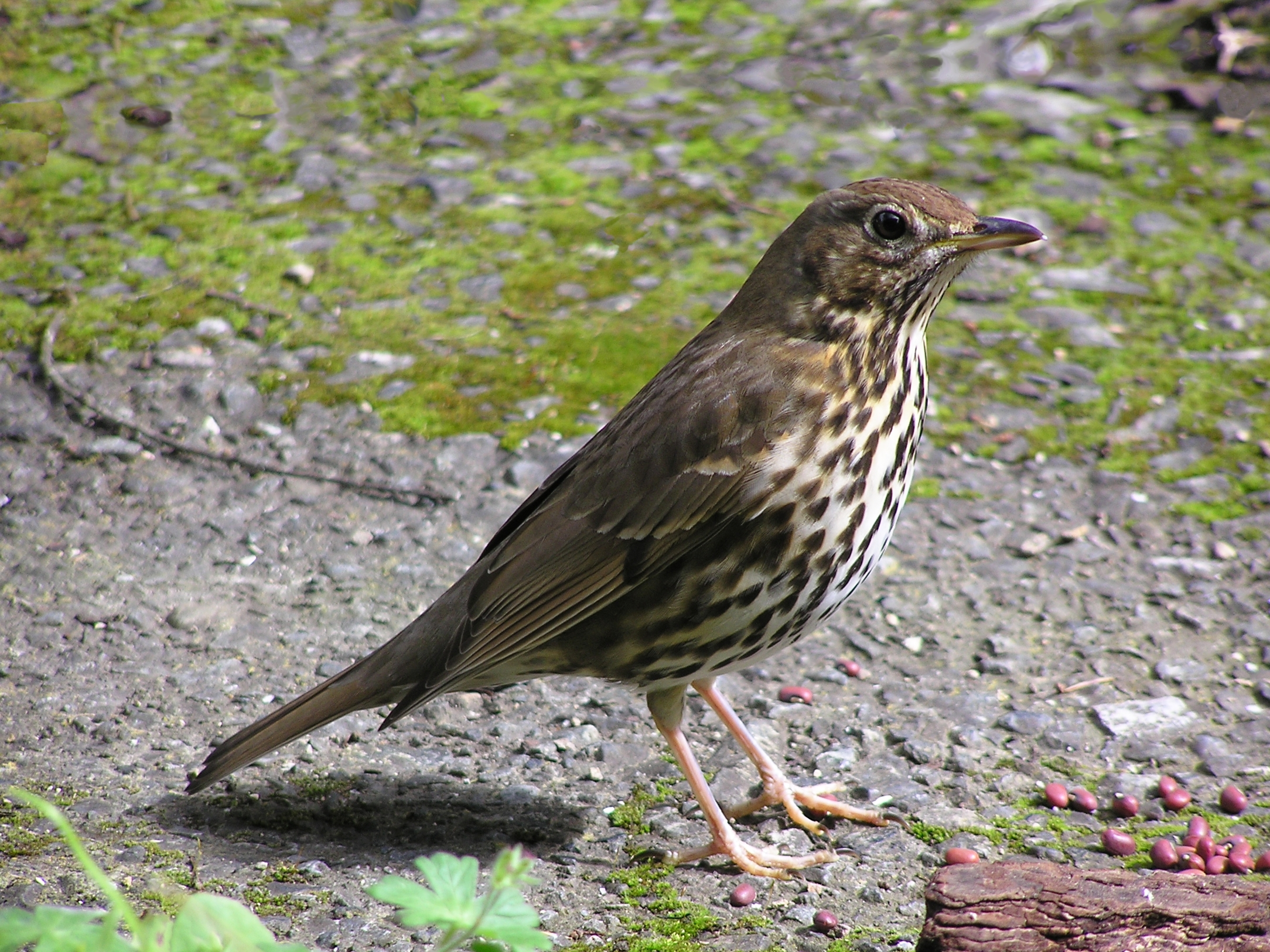
Song thrush winters in Algeria

Order: Passeriformes Family: Turdidae

The thrushes are a group of passerine birds that occur mainly in the Old World. They are plump, soft plumaged, small to medium-sized insectivores or sometimes omnivores, often feeding on the ground. Many have attractive songs.

- Mistle thrush, Turdus viscivorus LC
- Song thrush, Turdus philomelos LC
- Redwing, Turdus iliacus NT
- Eurasian blackbird, Turdus merula LC
- Fieldfare, Turdus pilaris (A) LC
- Ring ouzel, Turdus torquatus LC

== Old World flycatchers ==
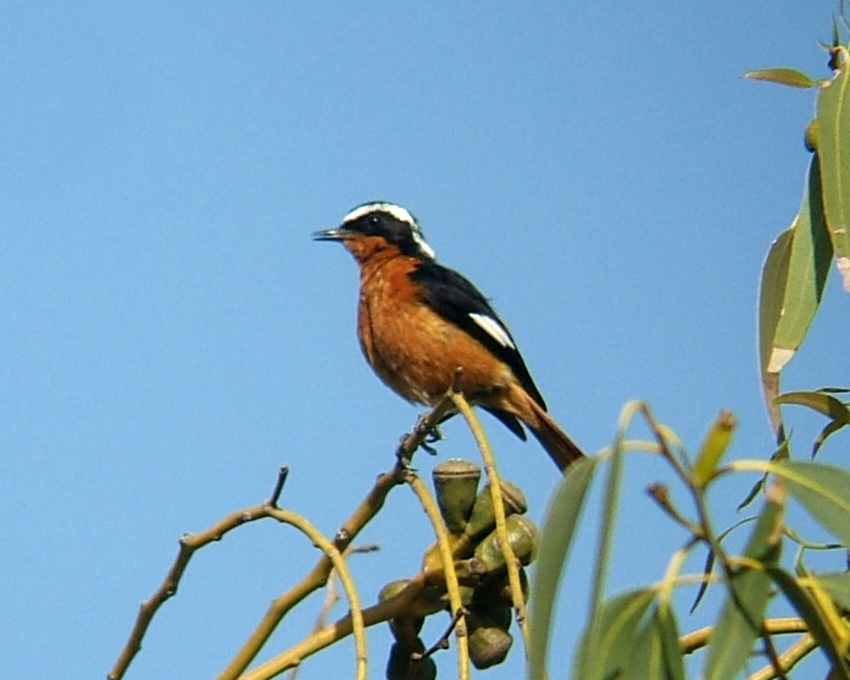
Moussier's redstart

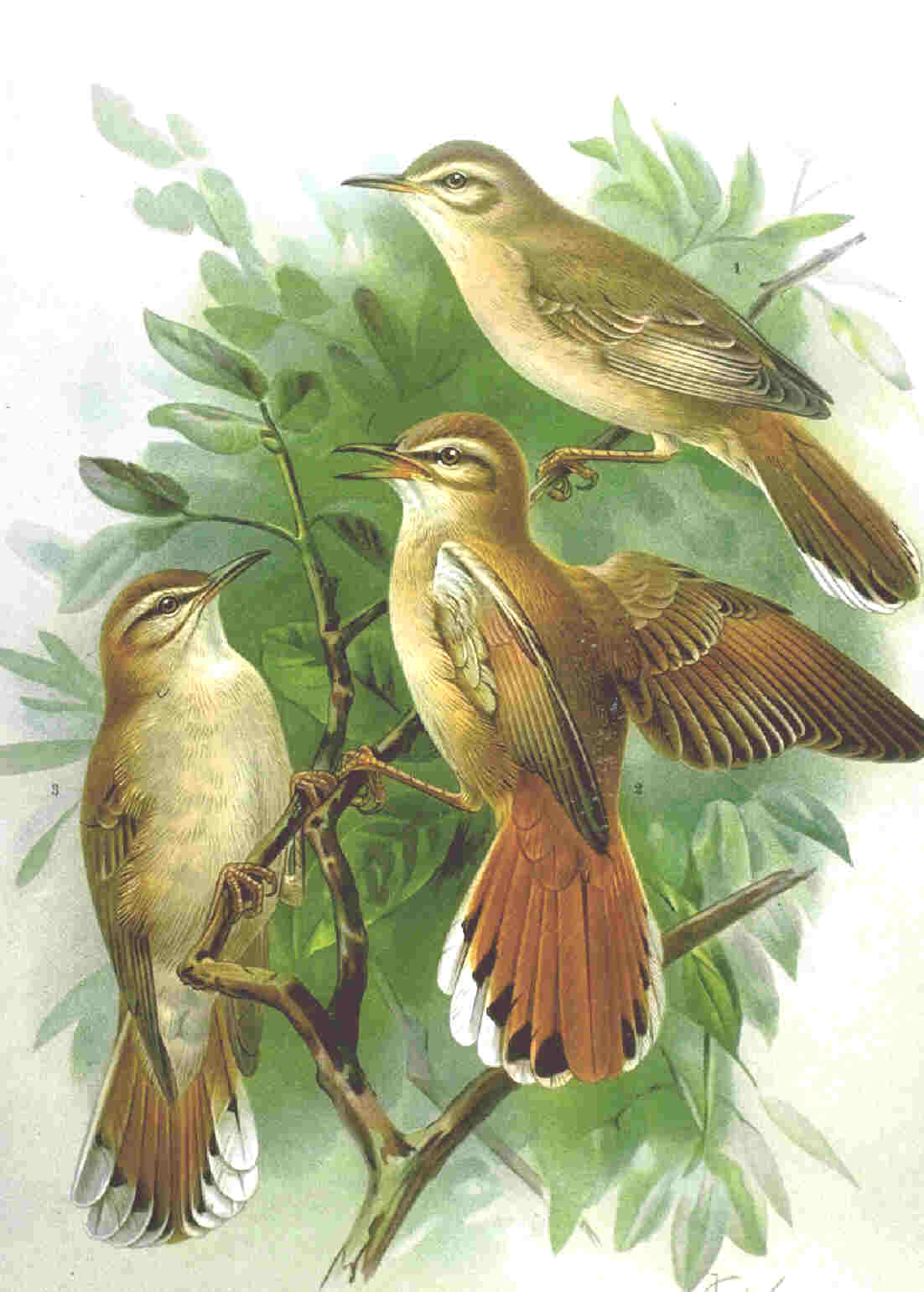
Rufous bush robin

Order: Passeriformes Family: Muscicapidae

Old World flycatchers are a large group of small passerine birds native to the Old World. They are mainly small arboreal insectivores. The appearance of these birds is highly varied, but they mostly have weak songs and harsh calls.

- Spotted flycatcher, Muscicapa striata LC
- Black scrub-robin, Cercotrichas podobe (A) LC
- Rufous-tailed scrub-robin, Cercotrichas galactotes LC
- European robin, Erithacus rubecula LC
- Common nightingale, Luscinia megarhynchos LC
- Bluethroat, Luscinia svecica LC
- Red-breasted flycatcher, Ficedula parva LC
- European pied flycatcher, Ficedula hypoleuca LC
- Atlas flycatcher, Ficedula speculigera NE
- Collared flycatcher, Ficedula albicollis LC
- Moussier's redstart, Phoenicurus moussieri LC
- Common redstart, Phoenicurus phoenicurus LC
- Black redstart, Phoenicurus ochruros LC
- Rufous-tailed rock-thrush, Monticola saxatilis LC
- Blue rock-thrush, Monticola solitarius LC
- Whinchat, Saxicola rubetra LC
- European stonechat, Saxicola rubicola LC
- Northern wheatear, Oenanthe oenanthe LC
- Atlas wheatear, Oenanthe seebohmi LC
- Isabelline wheatear, Oenanthe isabellina LC
- Desert wheatear, Oenanthe deserti LC
- Western black-eared wheatear, Oenanthe hispanica LC
- Eastern black-eared wheatear, Oenanthe melanoleuca NE
- Red-rumped wheatear, Oenanthe moesta LC
- Black wheatear, Oenanthe leucura LC
- White-crowned wheatear, Oenanthe leucopyga LC
- Mourning wheatear, Oenanthe lugens LC

== Waxwings ==
Order: Passeriformes Family: Bombycillidae

The waxwings are a group of passerine birds with soft silky plumage and unique red tips to some of the wing feathers. In the Bohemian and cedar waxwings, these tips look like sealing wax and give the group its name. These are arboreal birds of northern forests. They live on insects in summer and berries in winter.

- Bohemian waxwing, Bombycilla garrulus LC

== Weavers and allies ==
Order: Passeriformes Family: Ploceidae

The weavers are small passerine birds related to the finches. They are seed-eating birds with rounded conical bills. The males of many species are brightly coloured, usually in red or yellow and black, some species show variation in colour only in the breeding season.

- Vitelline masked-weaver, Ploceus vitellinus (A) LC
- Village weaver, Ploceus cucullatus (A) LC

== Waxbills and allies ==
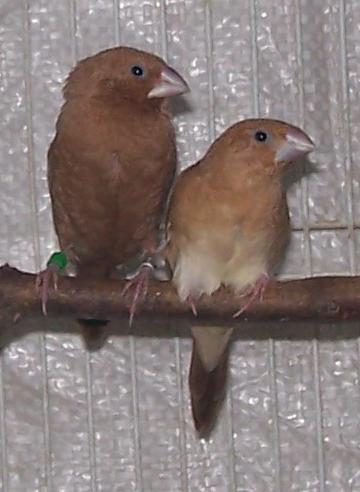
African silverbill

Order: Passeriformes Family: Estrildidae

The estrildid finches are small passerine birds of the Old World tropics and Australasia. They are gregarious and often colonial seed eaters with short thick but pointed bills. They are all similar in structure and habits, but have wide variation in plumage colours and patterns.

- African silverbill, Euodice cantans (A) LC
- Indian silverbill, Euodice malabarica (I) LC
- Cut-throat, Amadina fasciata (A) LC
- Red-billed firefinch, Lagonosticta senegala LC

== Accentors ==
Order: Passeriformes Family: Prunellidae

The accentors are in the only bird family, Prunellidae, which is completely endemic to the Palearctic. They are small, fairly drab species superficially similar to sparrows.

- Alpine accentor, Prunella collaris LC
- Dunnock, Prunella modularis LC

== Indigobirds ==
Order: Passeriformes Family: Viduidae

The indigobirds are finch-like species which usually have black or indigo predominating in their plumage. All are brood parasites, which lay their eggs in the nests of estrildid finches.

- Village indigobird, Vidua chalybeata (A) LC

== Old World sparrows ==
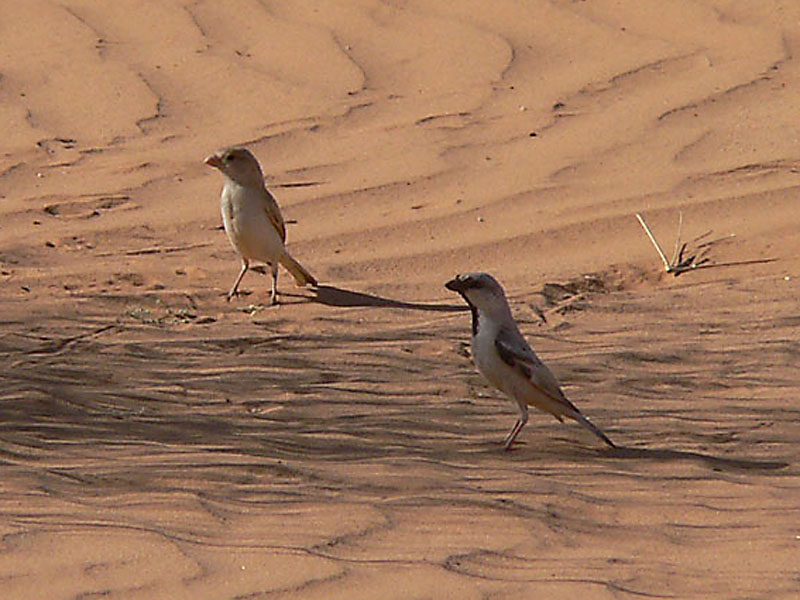
Desert sparrows

Order: Passeriformes Family: Passeridae

Old World sparrows are small passerine birds. In general, sparrows tend to be small, plump, brown or grey birds with short tails and short powerful beaks. Old World sparrow are seed eaters, but they also consume small insects.

- House sparrow, Passer domesticus LC
- Italian sparrow, Passer domesticus (A) VU
- Spanish sparrow, Passer hispaniolensis LC
- Desert sparrow, Passer simplex LC
- Eurasian tree sparrow, Passer montanus (A) LC
- Sudan golden sparrow, Passer luteus LC
- Rock sparrow, Petronia petronia LC

== Wagtails and pipits ==
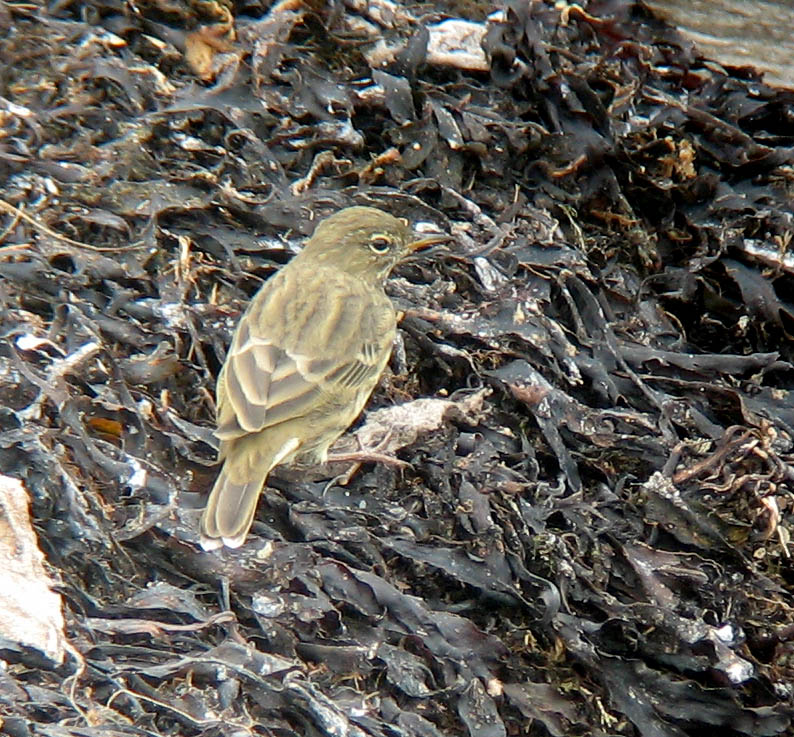
Rock pipit

Order: Passeriformes Family: Motacillidae

Motacillidae is a family of small passerine birds with medium to long tails. They include the wagtails, longclaws and pipits. They are slender, ground feeding insectivores of open country.

- Gray wagtail, Motacilla cinerea LC
- Western yellow wagtail, Motacilla flava LC
- White wagtail, Motacilla alba LC
- Richard's pipit, Anthus richardi LC
- Tawny pipit, Anthus campestris LC
- Meadow pipit, Anthus pratensis LC
- Tree pipit, Anthus trivialis LC
- Red-throated pipit, Anthus cervinus LC
- Water pipit, Anthus spinoletta LC
- Rock pipit, Anthus petrosus LC

== Finches, euphonias, and allies ==
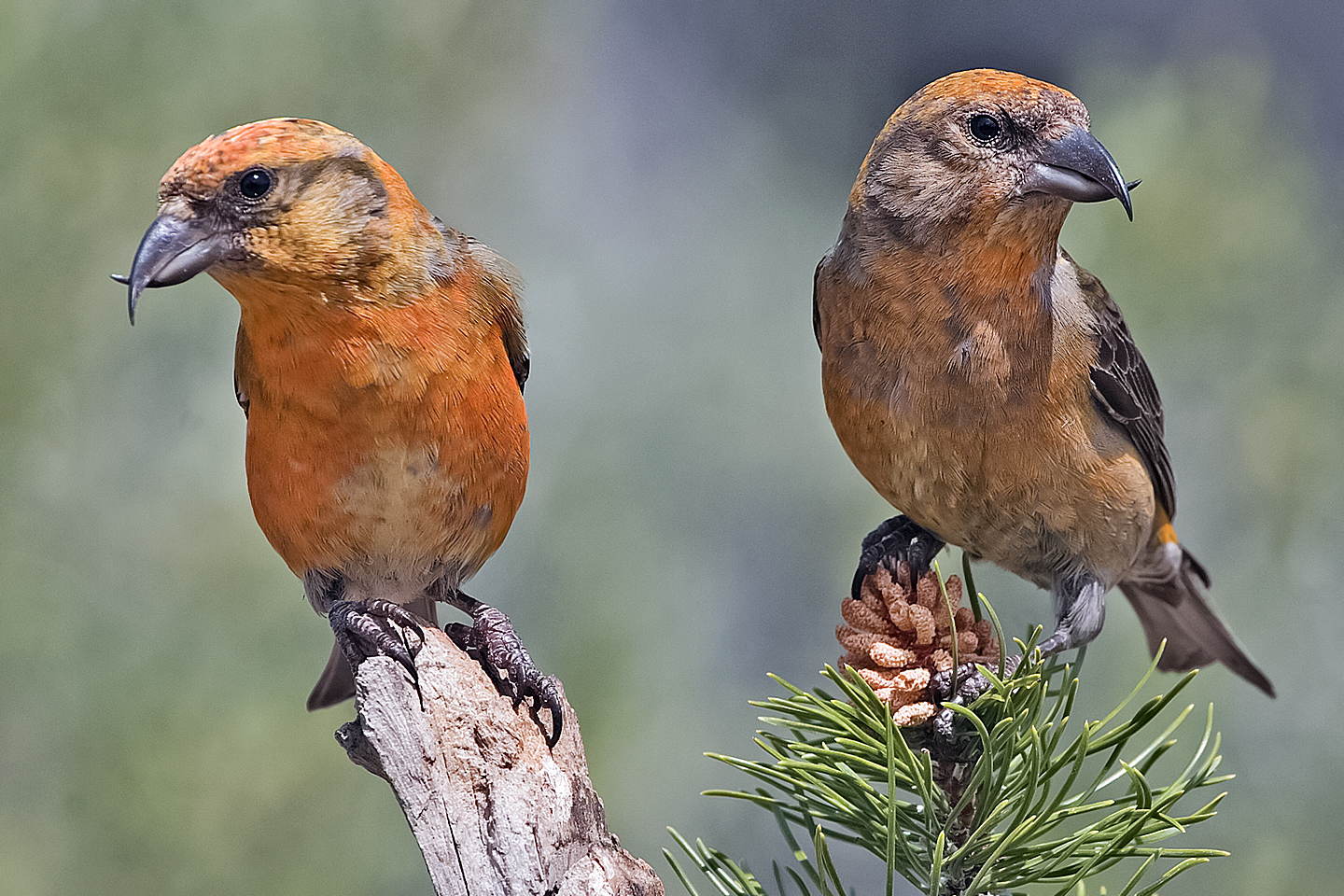
Red crossbill

Order: Passeriformes Family: Fringillidae

Finches are seed-eating passerine birds, that are small to moderately large and have a strong beak, usually conical and in some species very large. All have twelve tail feathers and nine primaries. These birds have a bouncing flight with alternating bouts of flapping and gliding on closed wings, and most sing well.

- Common chaffinch, Fringilla coelebs LC
- Brambling, Fringilla montifringilla LC
- Hawfinch, Coccothraustes coccothraustes LC
- Eurasian bullfinch, Pyrrhula pyrrhula LC
- Crimson-winged finch, Rhodopechys sanguinea LC
- Trumpeter finch, Bucanetes githaginea LC
- European greenfinch, Chloris chloris LC
- Eurasian linnet, Linaria cannabina LC
- Red crossbill, Loxia curvirostra LC
- European goldfinch, Carduelis carduelis LC
- Citril finch, Carduelis citrinella (A) LC
- European serin, Serinus serinus LC
- Eurasian siskin, Spinus spinus LC

== Longspurs and snow buntings ==
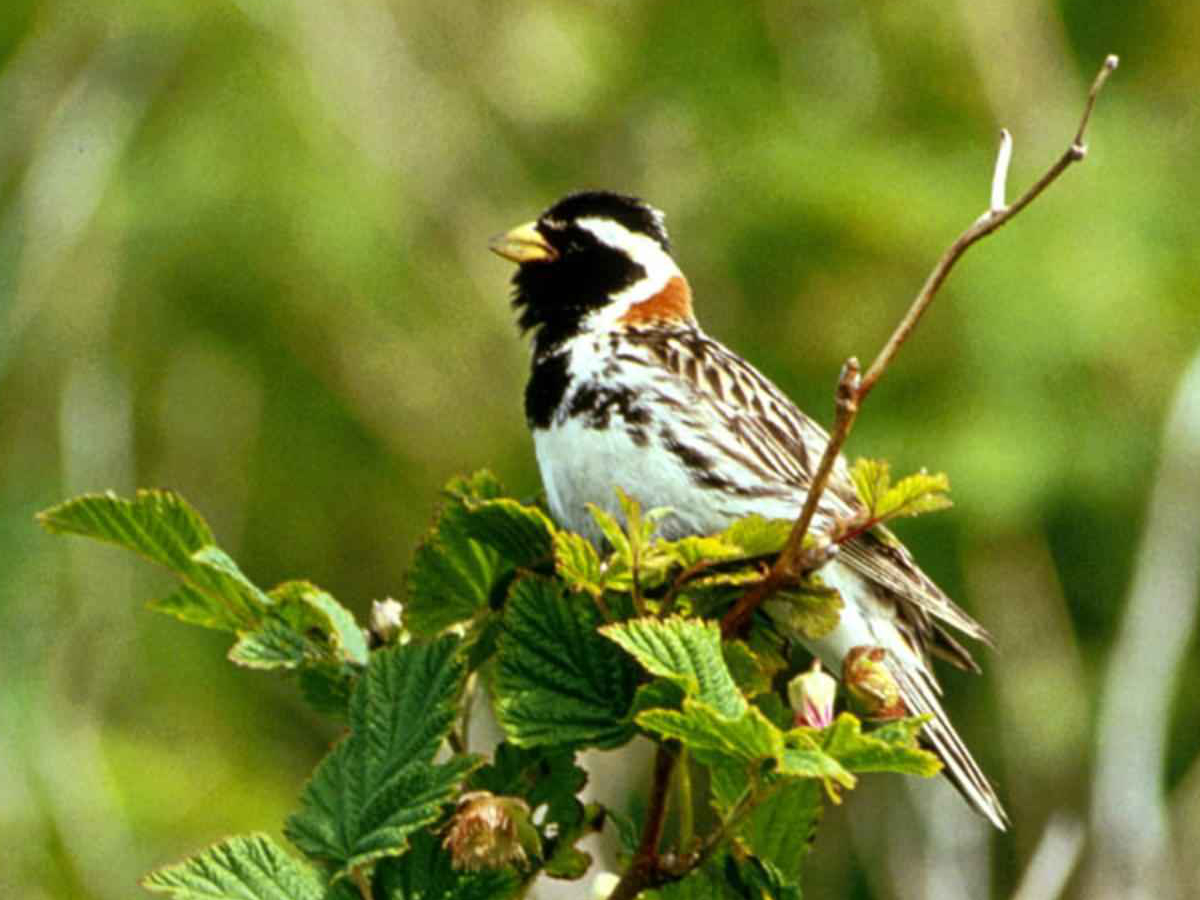
Lapland lonspur

Order: Passeriformes Family: Calcariidae

The Calcariidae are a group of passerine birds which had been traditionally grouped with the New World sparrows, but differ in a number of respects and are usually found in open grassy areas.

- Lapland longspur, Calcarius lapponicus (A) LC
- Snow bunting, Plectrophenax nivalis (A) LC

== Old World buntings ==
Order: Passeriformes Family: Emberizidae

The emberizids are a large family of passerine birds. They are seed-eating birds with distinctively shaped bills. In Europe, most species are called buntings. Many emberizid species have distinctive head patterns.

- Black-headed bunting, Emberiza melanocephala (A) LC
- Corn bunting, Emberiza calandra LC
- Rock bunting, Emberiza cia LC
- Cirl bunting, Emberiza cirlus LC
- Yellowhammer, Emberiza citrinella (A) LC
- Ortolan bunting, Emberiza hortulana LC
- Cretzschmar's bunting, Emberiza caesia LC
- House bunting, Emberiza sahari LC
- Striolated bunting, Emberiza striolata LC
- Reed bunting, Emberiza schoeniclus LC
- Little bunting, Emberiza pusilla (A) LC
- Rustic bunting, Emberiza pusilla (A) VU

== See also ==
- List of birds
- Lists of birds by region
