= List of endemic birds of the Western Palearctic =

The following is a list of the restricted-range endemic bird species found in the Western Palearctic region:

- Caucasian black grouse
- Caucasian snowcock
- Cape Verde swift - (Cabo Verde)
- Plain swift (be, Madeira, Canary Islands)
- Laurel pigeon - (Canary Islands)
- Bolle's pigeon - (Canary Islands)
- Trocaz pigeon - (Madeira)
- Spanish imperial eagle - (Iberian Peninsula)
- Cape Verde buzzard - (Cabo Verde)
- Cyprus scops owl
- Raso lark - (Cabo Verde)
- Cape Verde swamp warbler - (Cabo Verde)
- Canary Islands chiffchaff
- Cyprus warbler
- Balearic warbler
- Marmora's warbler
- Tenerife goldcrest
- Madeira firecrest
- Algerian nuthatch
- Corsican nuthatch
- Güldenstädt's redstart
- Canary Islands stonechat
- Cyprus wheatear
- Iago sparrow - (Cabo Verde)
- Berthelot's pipit
- Azores bullfinch
- Scottish crossbill
- Corsican finch
- Atlantic canary
- Gran Canaria blue chaffinch
- Tenerife blue chaffinch

Most of these range-restricted species are endemic to Macaronesian or Mediterranean islands, while three are endemic to the Caucasus region.

In addition the following species are endemic to the region:

- Rock partridge
- Red-legged partridge
- Barbary partridge
- Houbara bustard
- Red-necked nightjar
- Western swamphen
- Mediterranean gull
- Yellow-legged gull (be)
- Audouin's gull (be)
- European storm-petrel (be)
- Band-rumped storm petrel (be)
- Monteiro's storm petrel (be)
- Cape Verde storm-petrel (be)
- Cory's shearwater (be)
- Scopoli's shearwater (be)
- Cape Verde shearwater (be)
- Barolo shearwater
- Boyd's shearwater (be)
- Yelkouan shearwater
- Fea's petrel (be)
- Desertas petrel (be)
- Zino's petrel (be)
- European shag
- Northern bald ibis
- Red kite
- Levant sparrowhawk (be)
- Maghreb owl
- Middle spotted woodpecker
- Iberian green woodpecker
- European green woodpecker
- Levaillant's woodpecker
- Eleonora's falcon (be)
- Iberian grey shrike
- Dupont's lark
- Maghreb lark
- Melodious warbler (be)
- Western olivaceous warbler (be)
- Western Bonelli's warbler (be)
- Iberian chiffchaff (be)
- Western Orphean warbler (be)
- Tristram's warbler
- Sardinian warbler (be)
- Moltoni's warbler (be)
- Western subalpine warbler (be)
- Eastern subalpine warbler (be)
- Spectacled warbler (be)
- Dartford warbler
- Iberian magpie
- Maghreb magpie
- Crested tit
- African blue tit
- Common firecrest
- Krüper's nuthatch
- Short-toed treecreeper
- Spotless starling
- Atlas flycatcher
- Moussier's redstart
- Atlas wheatear (be)
- Black wheatear
- Maghreb wheatear
- Red-rumped wheatear
- Italian sparrow
- Rock pipit
- Lesser redpoll
- Citril finch
- European serin
- Syrian serin
- Parrot crossbill
- Sinai rosefinch
- Cirl bunting

(be) = Breeding endemic
