= Desert warbler =

The desert warbler is a former bird species, which has now been divided into two species:

- African desert warbler Sylvia deserti
- Asian desert warbler Sylvia nana
