= Chestnut-vented warbler =

- C. s. cinerascens, Kalahari, South Africa

Conservation status
- Least Concern (IUCN 3.1)

Scientific classification
- Kingdom: Animalia
- Phylum: Chordata
- Class: Aves
- Order: Passeriformes
- Family: Sylviidae
- Genus: Curruca
- Species: C. subcoerulea

Binomial name
- Curruca subcoerulea (Vieillot, 1817)

Synonyms
- Parisoma subcaeruleum; Sylvia subcaerulea

Species of bird

The chestnut-vented warbler, chestnut-vented tit-babbler or rufous-vented warbler (Curruca subcoerulea) is an Old World warbler of the family Sylviidae.

The chestnut-vented warbler breeds in southern Africa in Angola, Botswana, Zimbabwe, Zambia, Namibia, South Africa, Lesotho, Mozambique and Eswatini. This is a common species found in a range of habitats including fynbos, scrub, thickets and dry riverbeds.

== Taxonomy ==
The first formal description of the chestnut-vented warbler was by the French naturalist Louis Pierre Vieillot in 1817. He introduced the binomial name Sylvia subcœrulea using the œ ligature. The specific epithet would normally be spelled subcaerulea or subcærulea and comes from the Latin sub meaning somewhat or beneath and caeruleus for blue. In modern Latin subcaeruleus is used to indicate pale blue. Most authorities use the standard spelling subcaerulea but some use the original spelling subcoerulea.

== Description ==
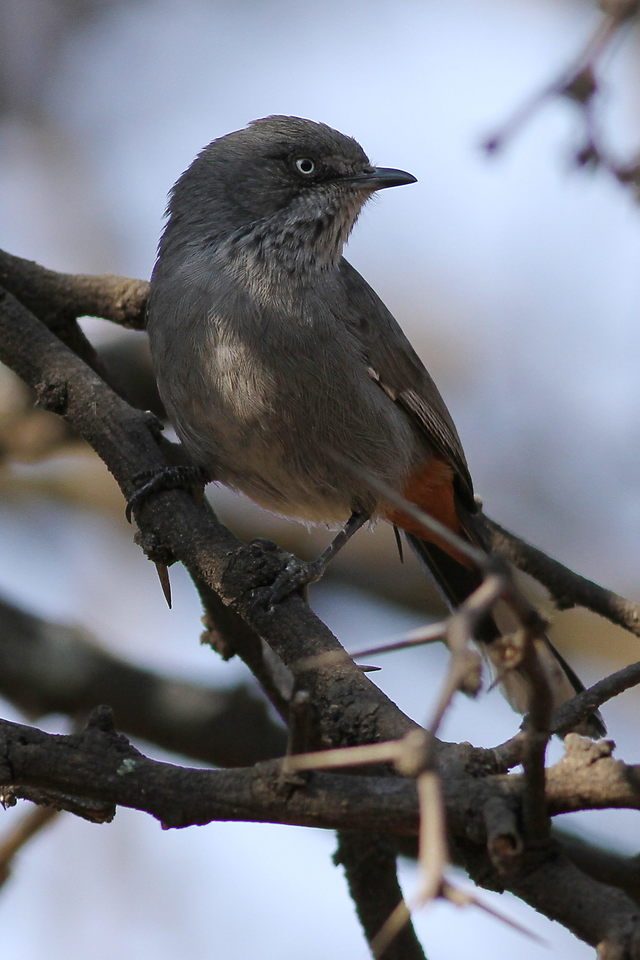
Chestnut-vented warbler

The chestnut-vented warbler is 14–15 cm long and weighs around 16 g. Its upperparts are grey-brown, and the tail is black with a broad white band at its tip. This warbler has a white eye ring. The throat is grey with heavy dark streaking, the breast and belly are grey, and the vent area is bright chestnut. The legs are black and the eyes are grey. The sexes are similar, but the juvenile has an unstreaked throat. The call is a loud fluted cheerup-chee-chee.

Layard's warbler, Curruca layardi, is the only similar species, but is paler, has more white in the tail, and lacks the chestnut vent.

== Behaviour ==
The chestnut-vented warbler builds a cup nest low in vegetation. This species is monogamous, pairing for life. It is usually seen alone or in pairs, moving through vegetation as it forages for insects and other small invertebrates.

== Conservation status ==
This common species has a large range, with an estimated extent of 2,800,000 km^{2}. The population size is believed to be large, and the species is not believed to approach the thresholds for the population decline criterion of the IUCN Red List (i.e. declining more than 30% in ten years or three generations). For these reasons, the species is evaluated as Least Concern.
