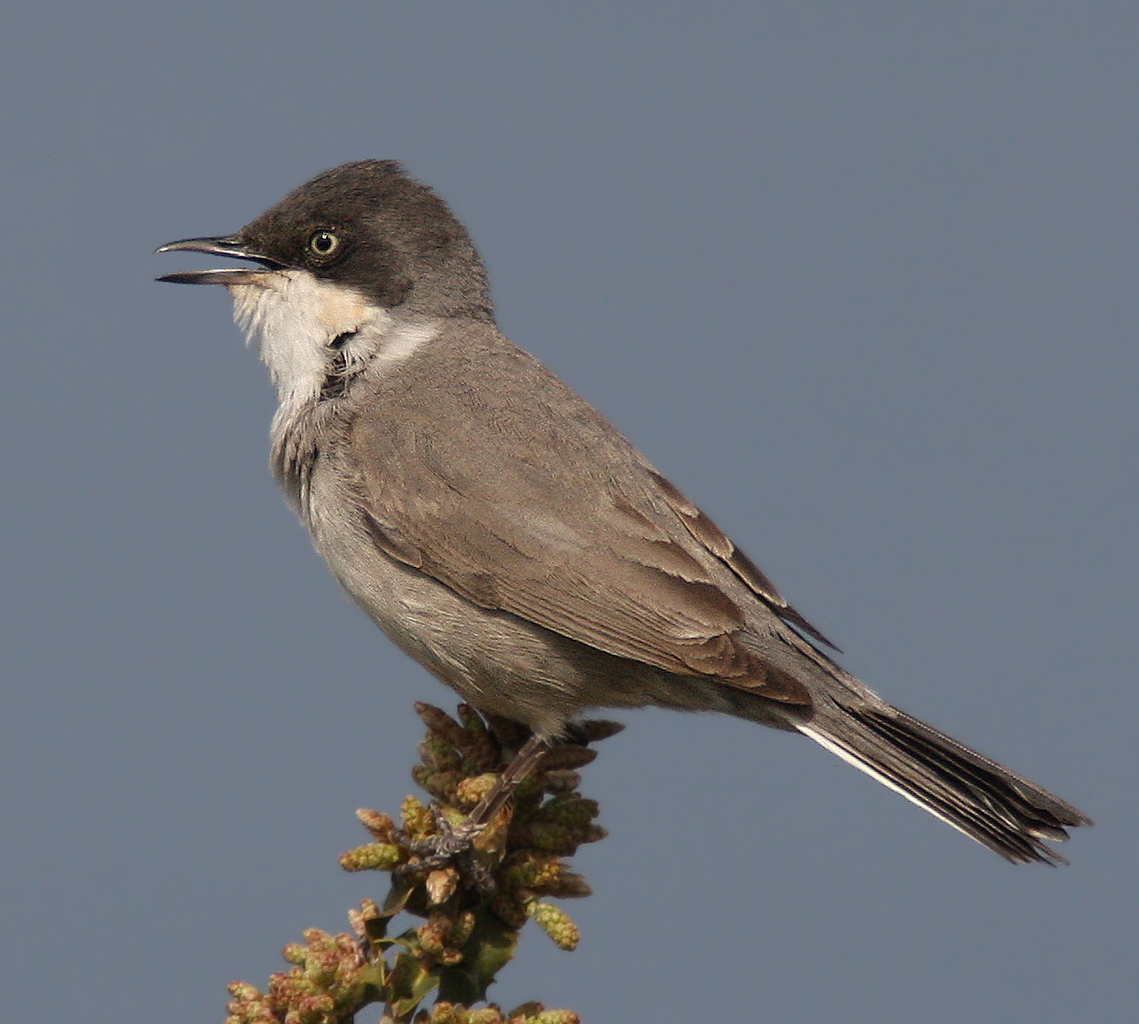
- In Lesbos, Greece

Conservation status
- Least Concern (IUCN 3.1)

Scientific classification
- Kingdom: Animalia
- Phylum: Chordata
- Class: Aves
- Order: Passeriformes
- Family: Sylviidae
- Genus: Curruca
- Species: C. crassirostris

Binomial name
- Curruca crassirostris (Cretzschmar, 1830)

Synonyms
- Sylvia crassirostris

= Eastern Orphean warbler =

Species of bird

The eastern Orphean warbler (Curruca crassirostris) is an Old World warbler of the genus Curruca. This species occurs in summer around the Mediterranean, through the Balkans via Turkey, the Caucasus and surrounding regions to Central Asia. It is migratory, wintering in sub-Saharan Africa.

At 15–16 cm length—somewhat larger than a blackcap—this is one of the largest species of typical warblers. The adult males have a plain grey back. The bill is long and pointed and the legs black. The male has a dark grey head, black eye mask, and white throat. The iris is white. Females and immatures have a paler head and reddish underparts; their grey back has a brownish tinge. The iris is dark in young birds. It is difficult to visually distinguish from the Western Orphean warbler.

The song is a series of warbling liroo-liroo and scolding notes. Its song is more varied than that of the western Orphean warbler, approaching the Nightingale in richness.

These small passerine birds are found in open deciduous woodland. 4–6 eggs are laid in a nest in a bush or tree. Like most "warblers", the eastern Orphean warbler is a nectarivore.
