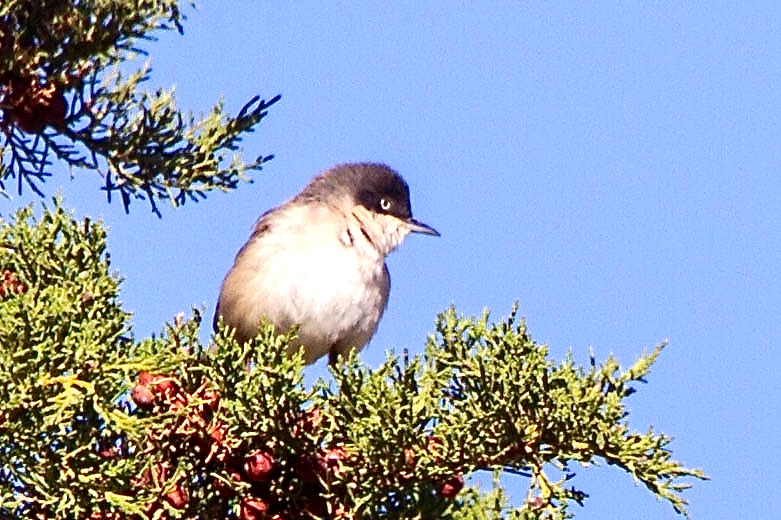
- In Morocco

Conservation status
- Least Concern (IUCN 3.1)

Scientific classification
- Kingdom: Animalia
- Phylum: Chordata
- Class: Aves
- Order: Passeriformes
- Family: Sylviidae
- Genus: Curruca
- Species: C. hortensis

Binomial name
- Curruca hortensis (Gmelin, 1789)

Synonyms
- Motacilla hortensis; Sylvia hortensis

= Western Orphean warbler =

Species of bird

The western Orphean warbler (Curruca hortensis) is an Old World warbler of the genus Curruca. This species occurs in summer around the Mediterranean, through western Europe and extending into northwest Africa. It is migratory, wintering in Sub-Saharan Africa. It is a rare vagrant to northern and north-western Europe.

== Taxonomy and etymology ==
The English name refers to the mythical musician and singer Orpheus. The specific hortensis is Latin for "of a garden", from hortus, "garden".

Two subspecies are unequivocally accepted, but they are now usually considered separate species.

The western Orphean warbler is probably most closely allied to the Arabian warbler, as well as the brown warbler and Yemen warblers which are sometimes placed in Parisoma. They together with the lesser whitethroat group seem to form a distinct clade of typical warblers. The species therein do not appear much alike at first glance, but they all have prominent white throats, lack rufous wing-patches, and usually having dark sides to the head.

== Description ==
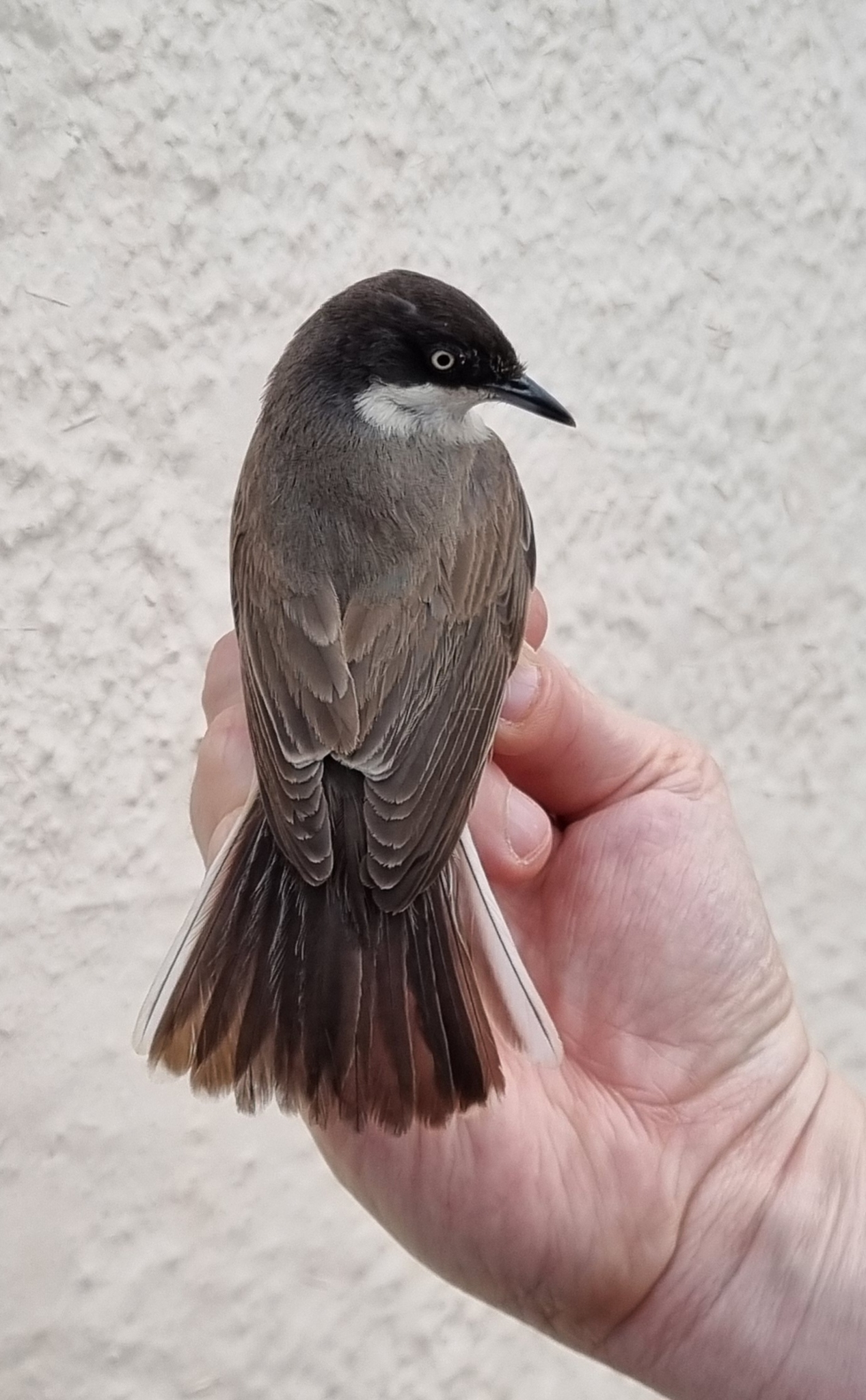
In Gibraltar

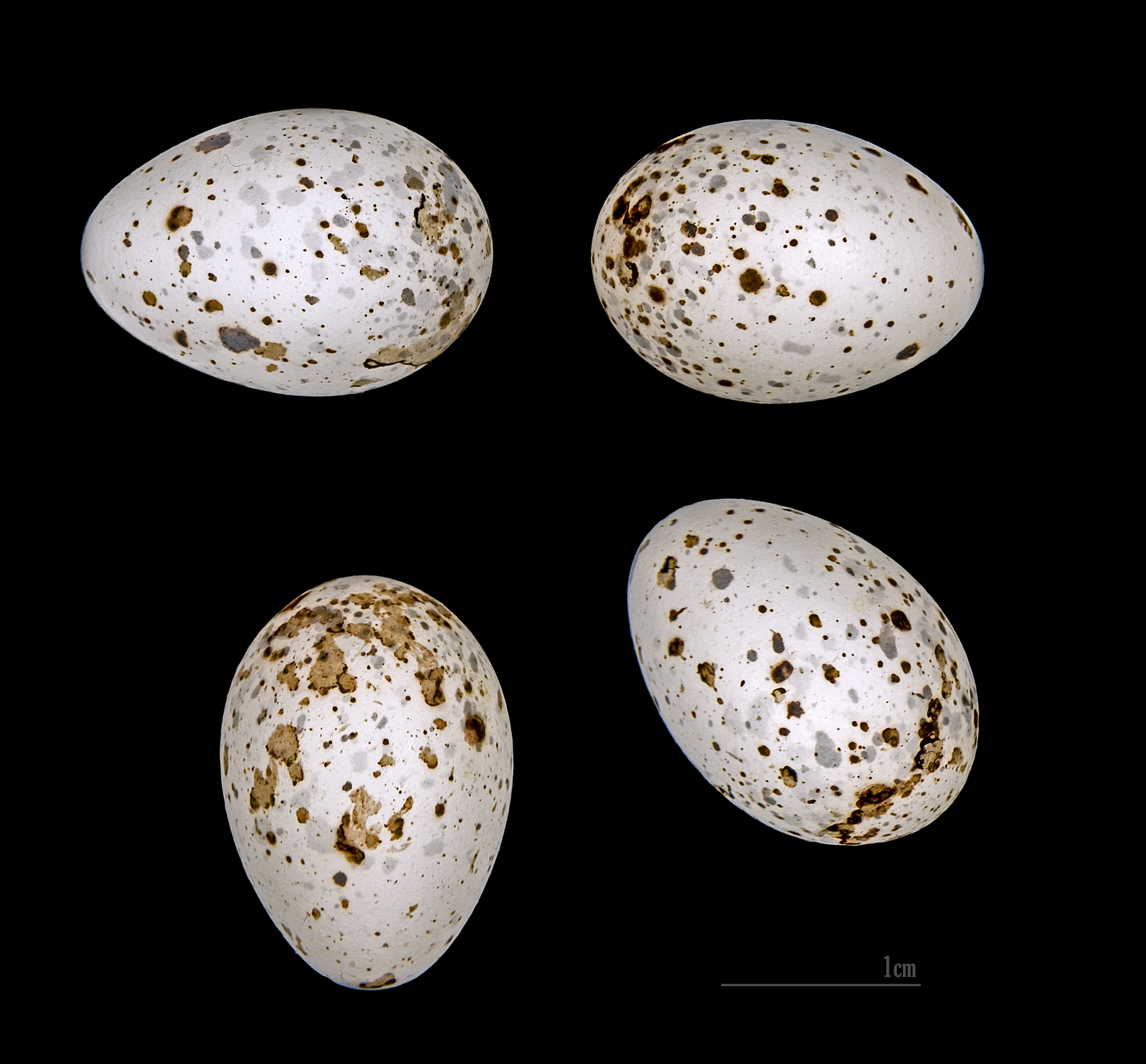
Eggs

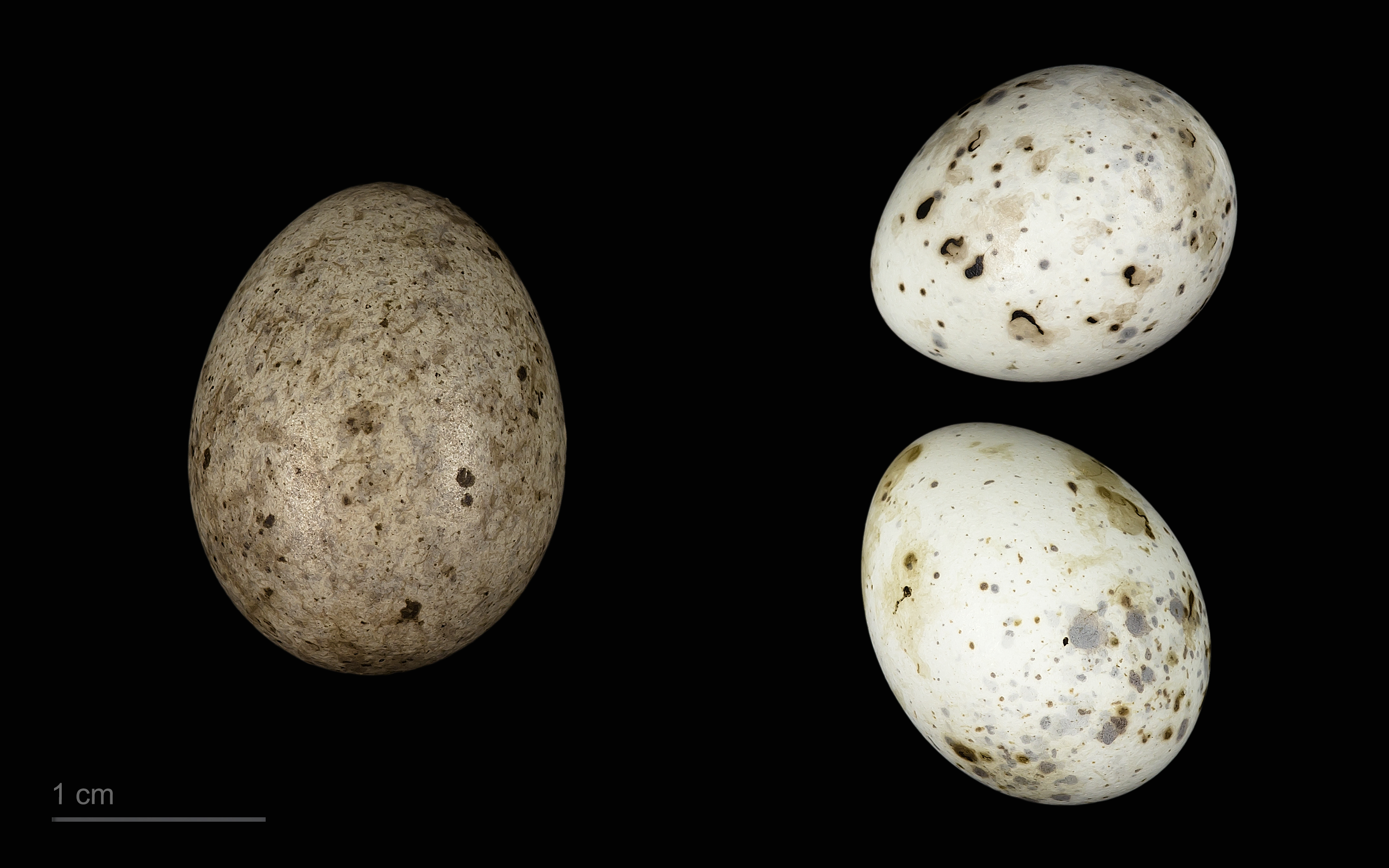
Cuculus canorus bangsi (Cuckoo) egg in a Sylvia hortensis clutch

At 15–16 centimetres (6–6 1/4 in) in length – somewhat larger than a blackcap – this is one of the largest species of typical warblers. The adult males have a plain grey back and whitish underparts. The bill is long and pointed and the legs black. The male has a dark grey head, black eye mask, and white throat. The iris is white. Females and immatures have a paler head and buff underparts; their grey back has a brownish tinge. The iris is dark in young birds. The song is a series of warbling liroo-liroo and scolding notes.

== Behaviour and ecology ==
These small passerine birds are found in open deciduous woodland. 4-6 eggs are laid in a nest in a bush or tree. Like most "warblers", the western Orphean warbler is an insectivore.
