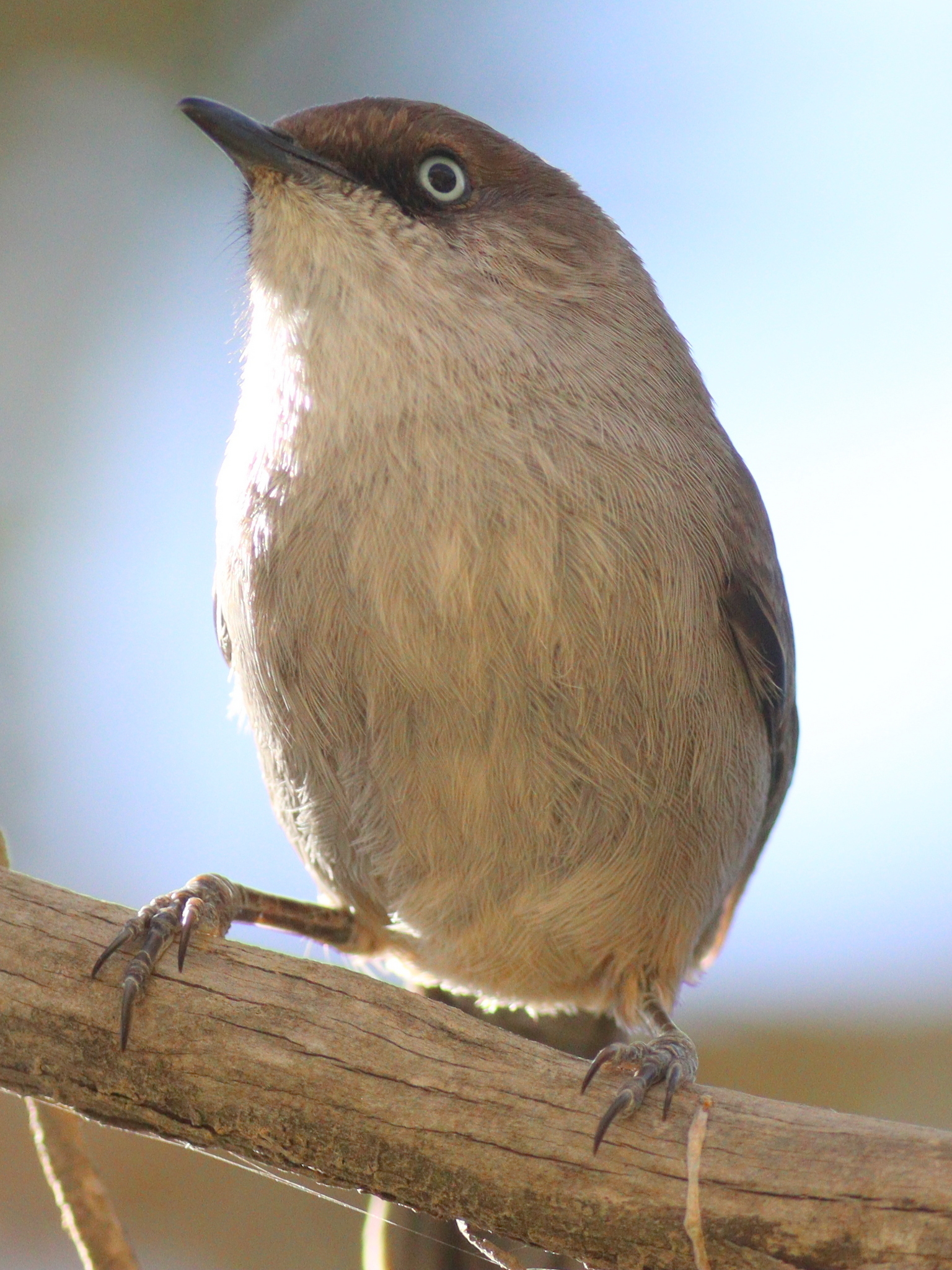

Conservation status
- Near Threatened (IUCN 3.1)

Scientific classification
- Kingdom: Animalia
- Phylum: Chordata
- Class: Aves
- Order: Passeriformes
- Family: Sylviidae
- Genus: Curruca
- Species: C. buryi

Binomial name
- Curruca buryi (Ogilvie-Grant, 1913)

Synonyms
- Parisoma buryi Ogilvie-Grant, 1913; Sylvia buryi (Ogilvie-Grant, 1913)

= Yemen warbler =

Species of bird

The Yemen warbler or Yemen parisoma (Curruca buryi) is a species of Old World warbler in the family Sylviidae. It is found on the southeastern slope of the Sarawat Mountains of Yemen and Saudi Arabia, where its natural habitat is subtropical or tropical dry forests. It is threatened by habitat loss and the International Union for Conservation of Nature has assessed its conservation status as being "Near Threatened."

== Taxonomy ==
The Yemen warbler was first described in 1913, by the Scottish ornithologist William Robert Ogilvie-Grant, as Parisoma buryi in the babbler family Timaliidae. However, examination of its mitochondrial DNA, vocalizations, behaviour and form led to it being transferred to the genus Curruca in the family Sylviidae. The type locality is Menacha, in Yemen. This warbler is closely related to the brown parisoma (Curruca lugens).

== Description ==
The Yemen warbler reaches a length of 15 cm (6 in) and has a weight of around 22 g (0.8 oz). The sexes are similar in appearance and have dark-brown upper parts and whitish underparts. The beak is slightly curved, the wings are relatively short and the tail rather long.

== Behaviour ==
The Yemen warbler is found in Acacia woodland, hedgerows and bushy areas in mountain regions of southwestern Saudi Arabia and Yemen. Its song is a short, thrush-like warble, often sung from a hidden perch. It feeds largely on insects including caterpillars, but also takes fruit and sips nectar. Breeding takes place between March and July, and the male and female stay together for much of the year.

== Status ==
In Yemen, this warbler is often found in Vachellia origena woodland while in Saudi Arabia it also occurs in woodland dominated by African juniper. It is threatened by a reduction in forest cover as lopping and felling of trees takes place for harvesting fuel and fodder, and little tree regeneration occurs. It is estimated that the total number of individual birds is in the range 3,500 to 15,000, and the International Union for Conservation of Nature has assessed its conservation status as being "Near Threatened".
