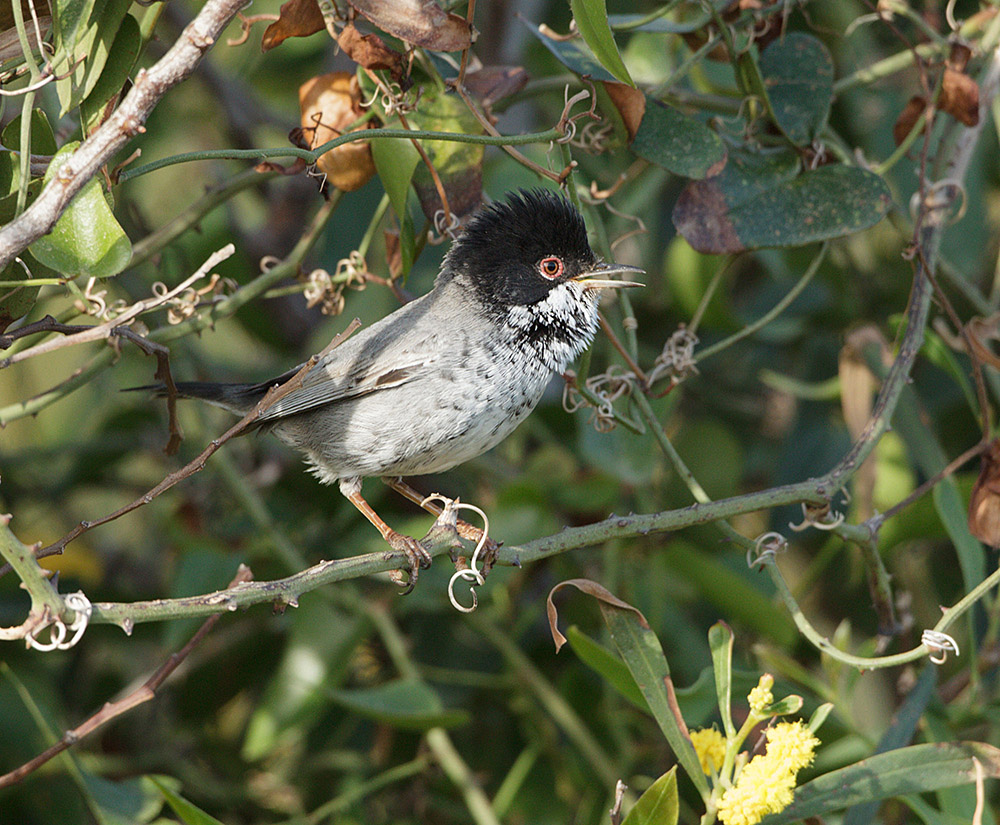
- Adult male

Conservation status
- Least Concern (IUCN 3.1)

Scientific classification
- Kingdom: Animalia
- Phylum: Chordata
- Class: Aves
- Order: Passeriformes
- Family: Sylviidae
- Genus: Curruca
- Species: C. melanothorax

Binomial name
- Curruca melanothorax (Tristram, 1872)

Synonyms
- Sylvia melanothorax

= Cyprus warbler =

Species of bird

The Cyprus warbler (Curruca melanothorax) is a warbler species in the family Sylviidae which breeds only on Cyprus. This small passerine bird is a short-distance migrant, and winters in Israel, Jordan and Egypt.

The Cyprus warbler was first formally described in 1872 by the English clergyman, Bible scholar, traveller and ornithologist Henry Baker Tristram with its type locality given as En-Gedi in Palestine. It was formerly classified in the genus Sylvia but this genus is split into two distinctive clades, and most of the species formerly classified in Sylvia were move to the genus Curruca.

Like most Curruca species, it has distinct male and female plumages. The adult male is a small warbler with a grey back, black head, white malar streaks ("moustaches"), and underparts heavily streaked with black. The female is mainly grey above, with a greyer head, and whitish with only light spotting. The Cyprus warbler's song is fast and rattling, and is similar to that of the Sardinian warbler.

The Cyprus warbler is in the group of Curruca warblers centred on the Mediterranean and is most closely related to Tristram's warbler and Menetries's warbler, and less closely to the Eastern subalpine warbler, Sardinian warbler and Rüppell's warbler. Both these groups have a white malar area, but this may not form a clear streak in the latter group; above the white, the heads of males are uniformly dark.

This is a bird of dry open country, often on hill slopes, with bushes for nesting. The nest is built in low shrub or gorse, and 3–5 eggs are laid. Like most "warblers", it is insectivorous, but will also take berries.
