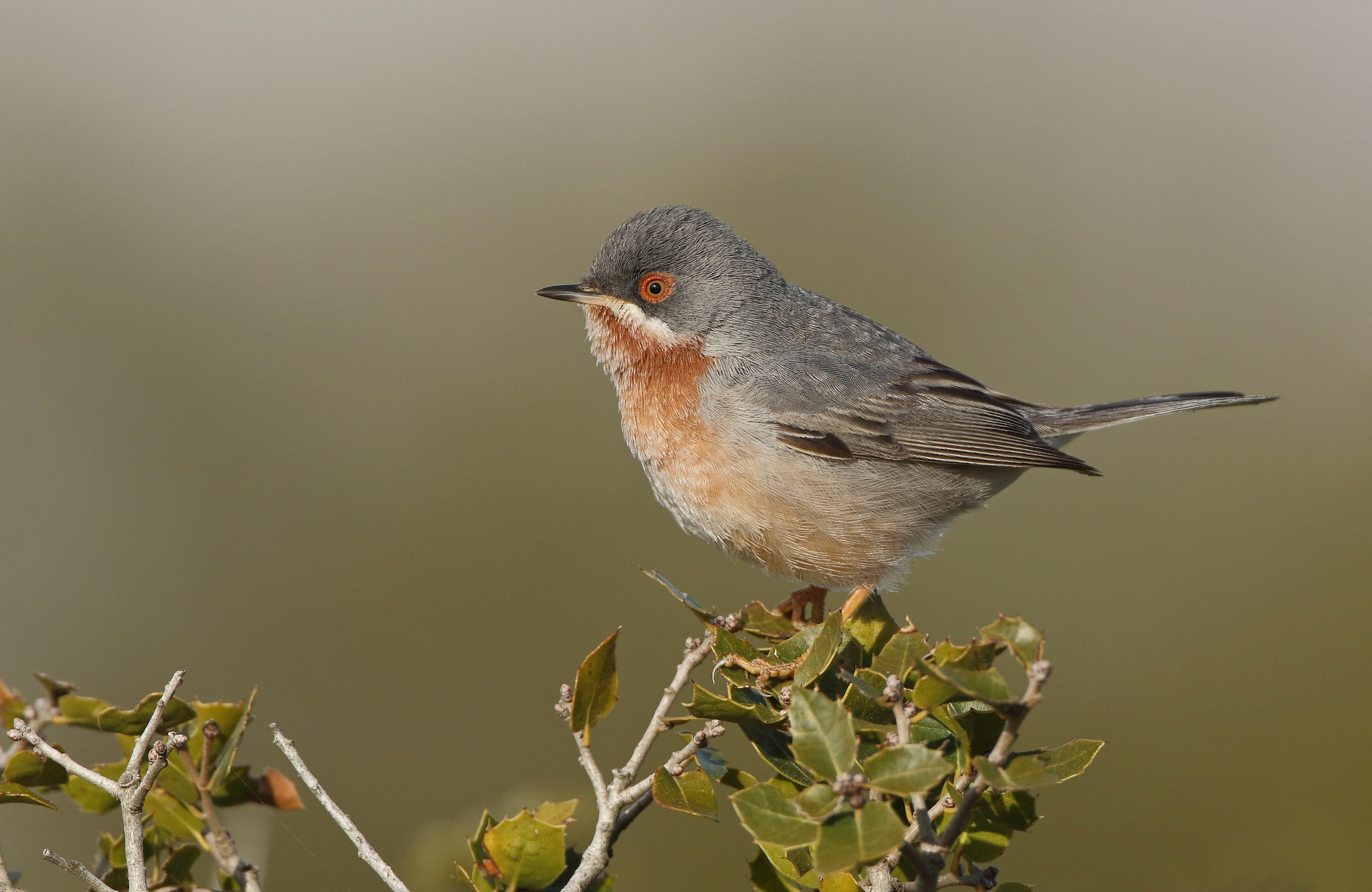
- Male
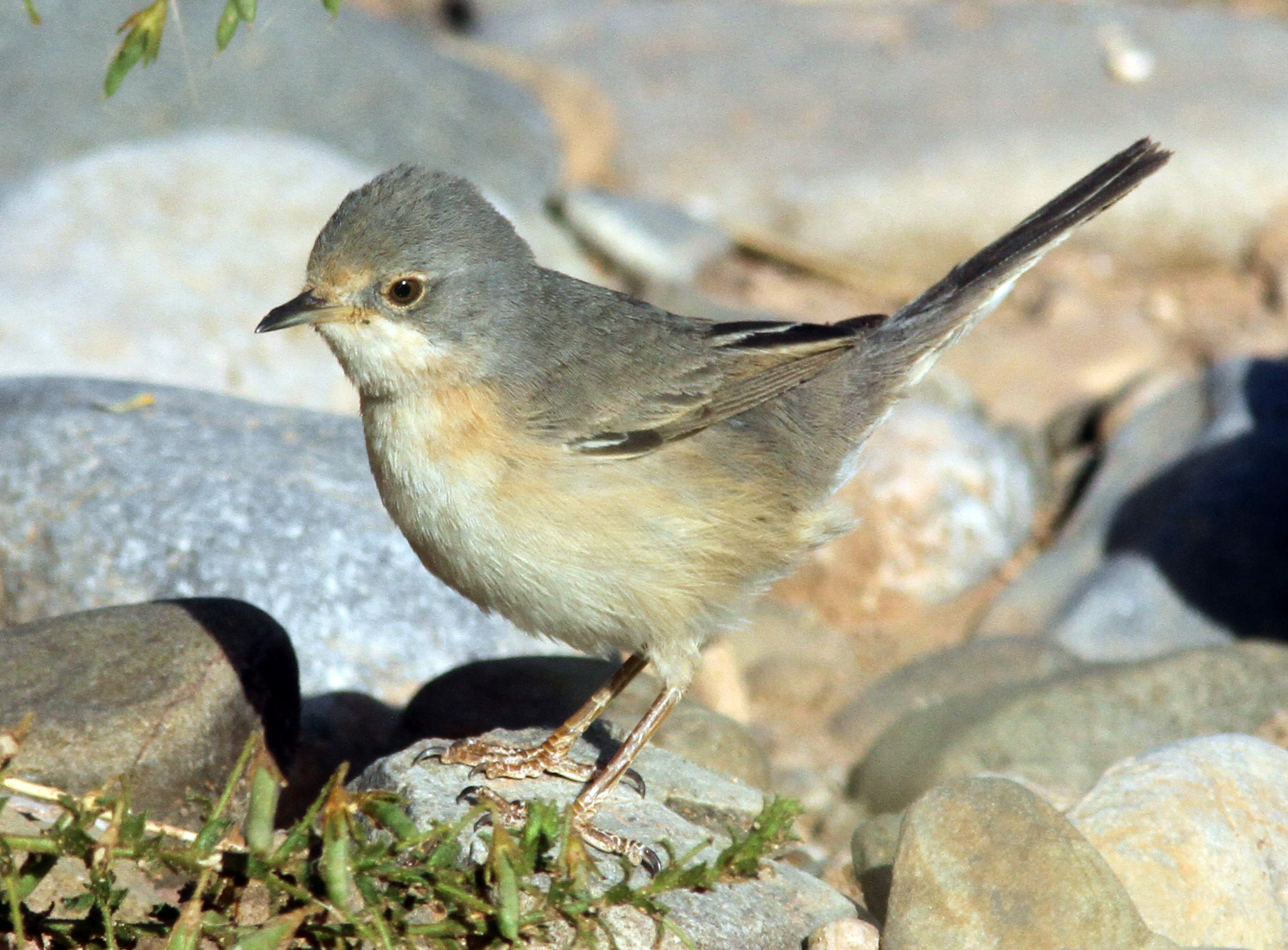
- Female

Conservation status
- Least Concern (IUCN 3.1)

Scientific classification
- Kingdom: Animalia
- Phylum: Chordata
- Class: Aves
- Order: Passeriformes
- Family: Sylviidae
- Genus: Curruca
- Species: C. cantillans

Binomial name
- Curruca cantillans (Pallas, 1764)

Synonyms
- Motacilla cantillans; Sylvia cantillans

= Eastern subalpine warbler =

Species of bird

The eastern subalpine warbler (Curruca cantillans) is a small Sylviidae warbler which breeds in the southernmost areas of Europe. It was first described by the German naturalist Peter Simon Pallas in 1764 and given the binomial name Motacilla cantillans. The specific cantillans is Latin for "warbling" from canere, "to sing".

Like most Curruca species, it has distinct male and female plumages. The adult male has a grey back and head, brick-red underparts, and white malar streaks ("moustaches"). The female is mainly brown above, with a greyer head, and whitish below with a pink flush. The subalpine warbler's song is fast and rattling, and is similar to the lesser whitethroat.

This bird seems to be related to the Sardinian warbler-Menetries' warbler superspecies. They all have white malar areas, the heads being dark above in adult males, and naked eye-rings. These three species are related to a superspecies consisting of Rüppell's warbler and the Cyprus warbler, which also share the white malar area with blackish above (Shirihai et al. 2001, Jønsson & Fjeldså 2006). The subalpine warbler is divided into two distinct subspecies groups, which may possibly be sufficiently diverged to qualify as two separate species (Shirihai et al. 2001). The two groups have differing male plumages, distinctive calls, and are allopatric; on this particular issue, further study is needed. In May 2020, the IOC world bird list recognised the split of western and eastern subalpine warblers into two distinct species.

Moltoni's warbler was formerly considered conspecific.

The eastern subalpine warbler differs from the western subalpine warbler by its deeper blue-grey upperparts, a blackish mask on the lores and ear-coverts, brick reddish-brown coloration confined to the throat and breast and sharply demarcated from a largely white belly, paler flanks and a wider white submoustachial stripe.

This is a bird of dry open country, often on hill slopes, with bushes for nesting. The nest is built in low shrub or gorse, and 3–5 eggs are laid. Like most "warblers", it is insectivorous, but will also take berries.

== Habitat and ecology ==
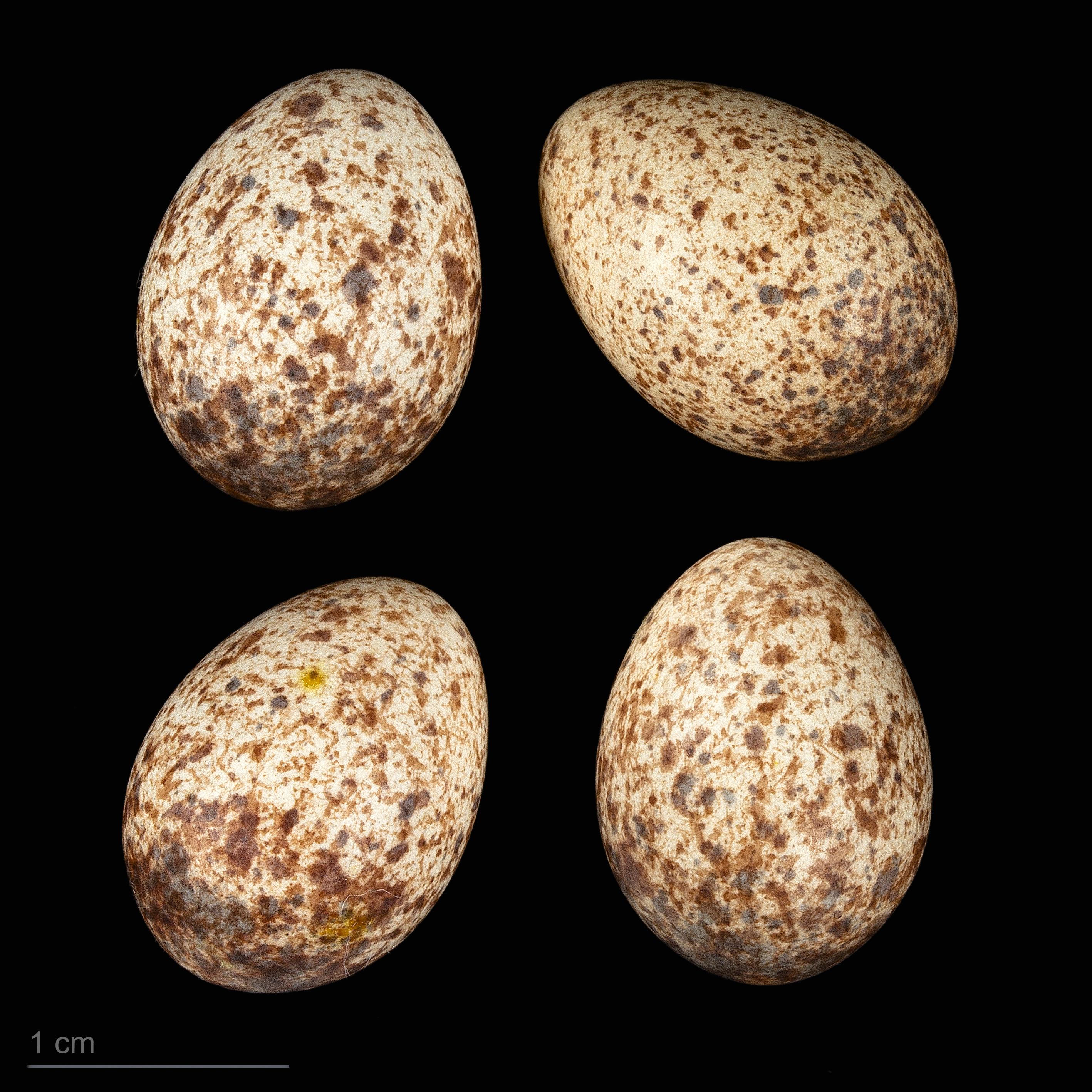
Curruca cantillans inornata - MHNT

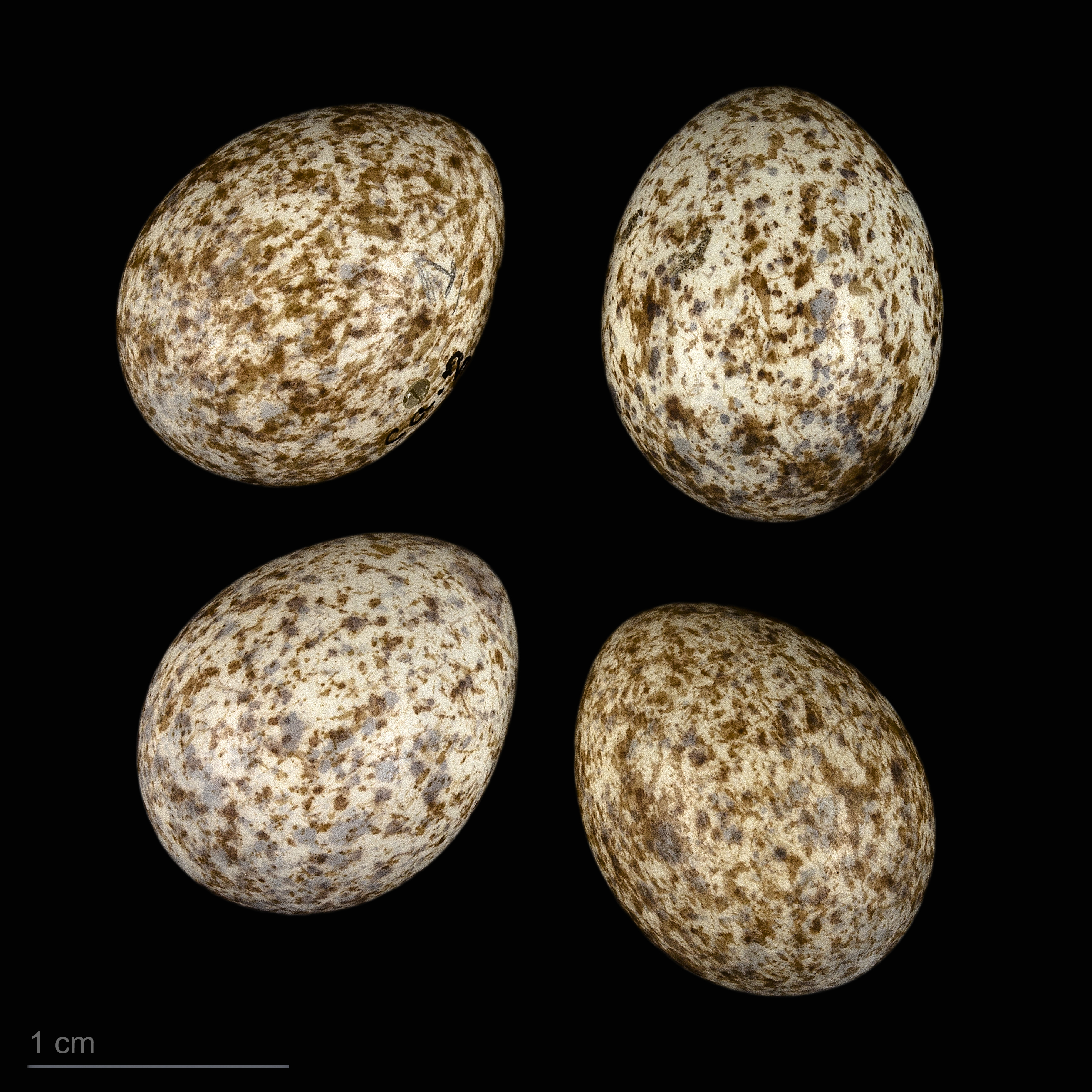
Curruca cantillans cantillans - MHNT

This species prefers tall and dense heterogeneous maquis with sparse tree cover in dry Mediterranean areas, particularly maquis of holm oak (Quercus ilex) and those dominated by strawberry tree (Arbutus) and tree-heath (Erica). It is also frequently found in young cork oak (Quercus suber) forest and in dense but treeless bushy areas. It uses bushy formations dominated by brambles (Rubus fruticosus) along sunny ravines and valley bottoms and prefers the intermediate stages of post-wildfire succession. Breeding occurs from late March to late June and the species is monogamous. The male constructs several 'cock nests' but both sexes build the breeding nest which is a deep, robust cup of grasses, thin roots and leaves and lined with finer grasses, rootlets and hair. It is placed in low scrub, a bush or small tree, c. 30–130 cm above the ground. Clutches are three to five eggs. The diet is mostly small insects and their larvae but outside of the breeding season berries and fruits are also taken.
