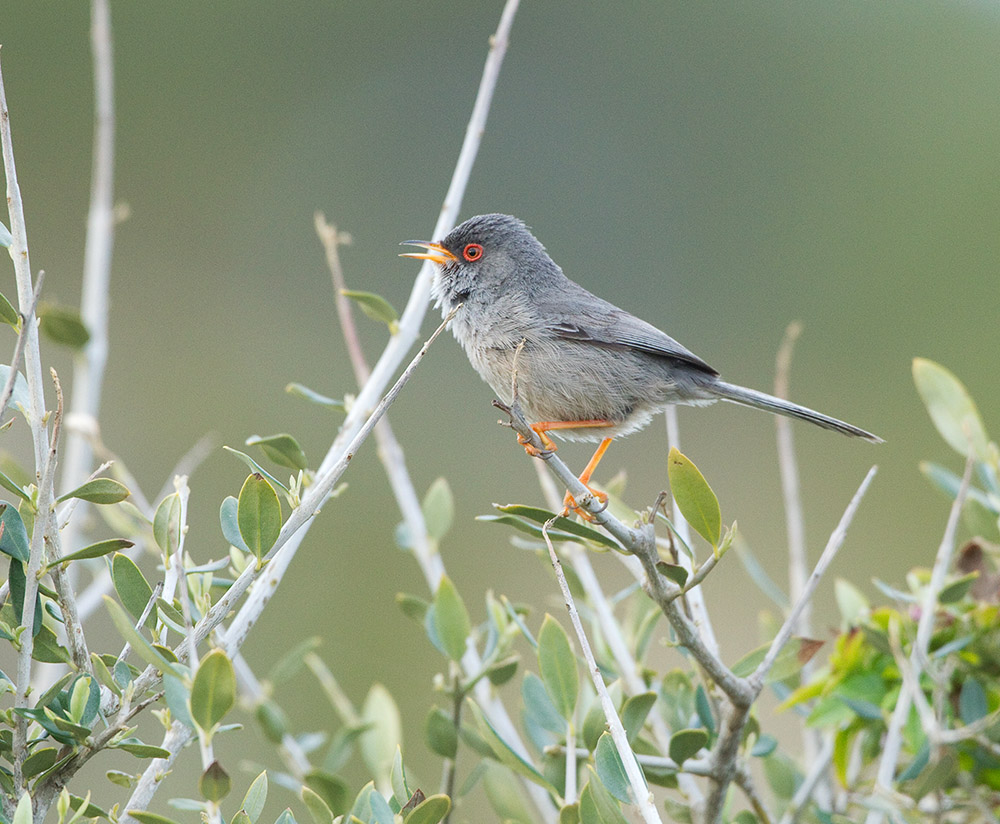
- Adult male

Conservation status
- Least Concern (IUCN 3.1)

Scientific classification
- Kingdom: Animalia
- Phylum: Chordata
- Class: Aves
- Order: Passeriformes
- Family: Sylviidae
- Genus: Curruca
- Species: C. balearica

Binomial name
- Curruca balearica (von Jordans, 1913)
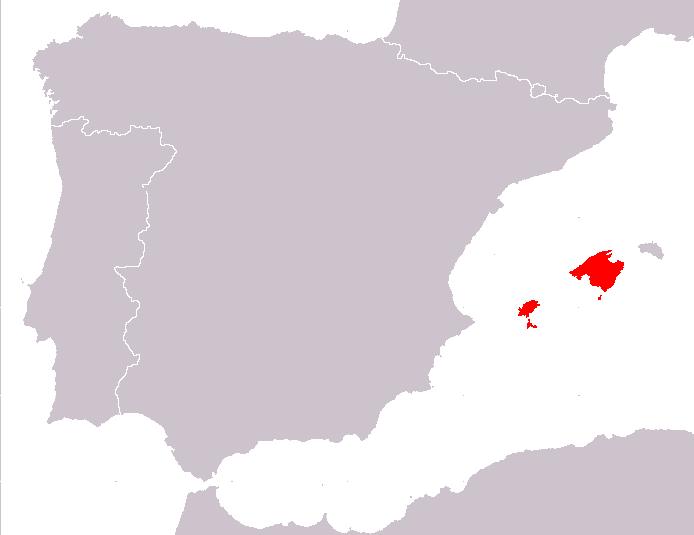

Synonyms
- Sylvia balearica

= Balearic warbler =

Species of bird

The Balearic warbler (Curruca balearica) is a warbler species of the genus Curruca. It is endemic to the Balearic Islands, apart from Menorca. It groups with Marmora's warbler, Tristram's warbler and the Dartford warbler (Helbig 2001, Jønsson & Fjeldså 2006).

These are small, long-tailed, large-headed birds, overall very similar to their close relatives in the Dartford warbler group. Balearic warblers are grey above and pale grey below, adding a pinkish tinge. Adult males have darker patches on the forehead and between the eye and the pointed bill. The legs and iris are red.

These small passerine birds are found in open country with thorny bushes and heather. 3-5 eggs are laid in a nest in a bush. Like most "warblers", they are insectivorous.

== Other sources ==
- Helbig, A. J. (2001): Phylogeny and biogeography of the genus Sylvia. In: Shirihai, Hadoram: Sylvia warblers: 24–29. Princeton University Press, Princeton, N.J. ISBN 0-691-08833-0
- Jønsson, Knud A. & Fjeldså, Jon (2006): A phylogenetic supertree of oscine passerine birds (Aves: Passeri). Zool. Scripta 35(2): 149–186. doi:10.1111/j.1463-6409.2006.00221.x (HTML abstract)
