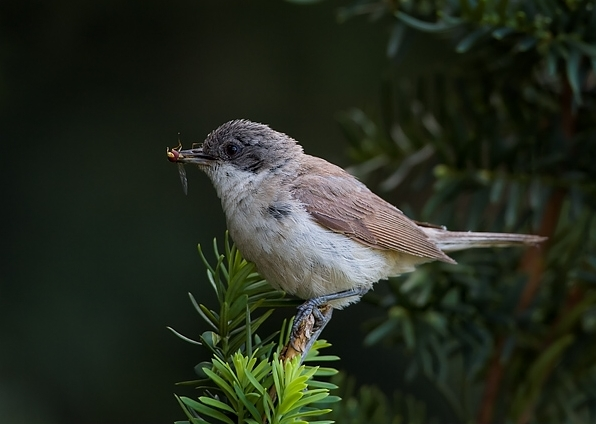
- Lesser whitethroat (Curruca curruca)

Scientific classification
- Kingdom: Animalia
- Phylum: Chordata
- Class: Aves
- Order: Passeriformes
- Family: Sylviidae
- Genus: Curruca; Bechstein, 1802

Type species
- Motacilla curruca Linnaeus, 1758

Species
- Many, see text

Synonyms
- Parisoma Swainson 1832. type Sylvia subcaerulea Vieillot.

= Curruca =

Genus of birds

Curruca is a genus of Sylviid warblers, best represented in Europe, Africa, and Asia. All of these species were formerly placed in the genus Sylvia.

== Taxonomy ==
The genus Curruca was introduced by the German naturalist Johann Matthäus Bechstein in 1802. The type species (by tautonomy) is the lesser whitethroat Curruca curruca. The name Curruca is the Latin word for an unidentified small bird mentioned by the Roman poet Juvenal. The genus was split from Sylvia in the Howard and Moore Checklist in 2014 after a molecular phylogenetic study published in 2011. The split is now recognised by most modern authorities.

== Species ==
The genus contains the following 25 species:

Image	Common name	Scientific name	Distribution
	Barred warbler	Curruca nisoria	Breeds central Palearctics; winters east Africa
	Layard's warbler	Curruca layardi	Southwest Africa
	Banded parisoma	Curruca boehmi	Northeast Africa
	Chestnut-vented warbler	Curruca subcoerulea	South Africa
	Lesser whitethroat	Curruca curruca	Breeds in Palearctic; winters Africa, south Asia, India
	Brown parisoma	Curruca lugens	Northeast Africa
	Yemen warbler	Curruca buryi	Montane southwest Saudi Arabia and southwest Yemen (southwest Arabian Peninsula)
	Arabian warbler	Curruca leucomelaena	Disjunctly from southeast Egypt and northeast Sudan to west, south Arabian Peninsula
	Western Orphean warbler	Curruca hortensis	Breeds southwest Europe and northwest Africa; winters west Africa Senegal to Chad
	Eastern Orphean warbler	Curruca crassirostris	Breeds southeast Europe to central Asia; winters northeast Africa to south Arabian Peninsula, south Iran, south Pakistan, India
	African desert warbler	Curruca deserti	Morocco to west Libya and Niger
	Asian desert warbler	Curruca nana	Breeds north Iran to Mongolia and northwest China; winters northeast Africa and Asia Minor
	Tristram's warbler	Curruca deserticola	Northwest Africa
	Menetries's warbler	Curruca mystacea	Breeds central south Palearctic; winters northeast Africa, Arabian Peninsula
	Rüppell's warbler	Curruca ruppeli	Breeds south Greece, Crete, Turkey and Syria; winters northeast Africa
	Cyprus warbler	Curruca melanothorax	Breeds Cyprus; winters Egypt, Sudan
	Sardinian warbler	Curruca melanocephala	Breeds southwest Palearctic; winters north Africa
	Western subalpine warbler	Curruca iberiae	Breeds Iberia, south France, and extreme northwest Italy. Also northwest Africa from Morocco to Tunisia; winters northwest, west Africa
	Moltoni's warbler	Curruca subalpina	Northwest to central north Italy, Corsica, Sardinia, Balearics
	Eastern subalpine warbler	Curruca cantillans	Breeds northeast Italy through southeast Europe to west Turkey. Also south Italy and Sicily; winters north Africa
	Common whitethroat	Curruca communis	Breeds Palearctic; winters Africa
	Spectacled warbler	Curruca conspicillata	Breeds southwest Palearctic; winters northwest, north Africa
	Marmora's warbler	Curruca sarda	Breeds Mediterranean Islands; winters northwest Africa
	Dartford warbler	Curruca undata	Southwest Palearctic
	Balearic warbler	Curruca balearica	Balearic Islands
