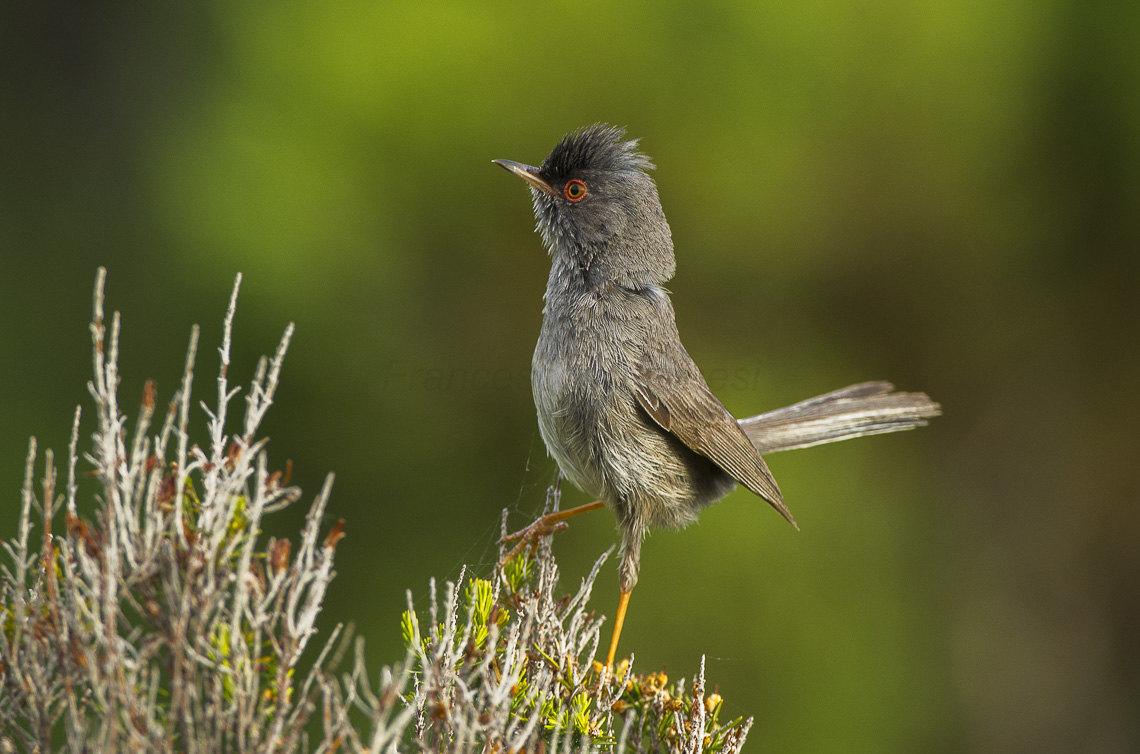
- In Sardinia

Conservation status
- Least Concern (IUCN 3.1)

Scientific classification
- Kingdom: Animalia
- Phylum: Chordata
- Class: Aves
- Order: Passeriformes
- Family: Sylviidae
- Genus: Curruca
- Species: C. sarda

Binomial name
- Curruca sarda (Temminck, 1820)

Synonyms
- Sylvia sarda (protonym)

= Marmora's warbler =

Species of bird

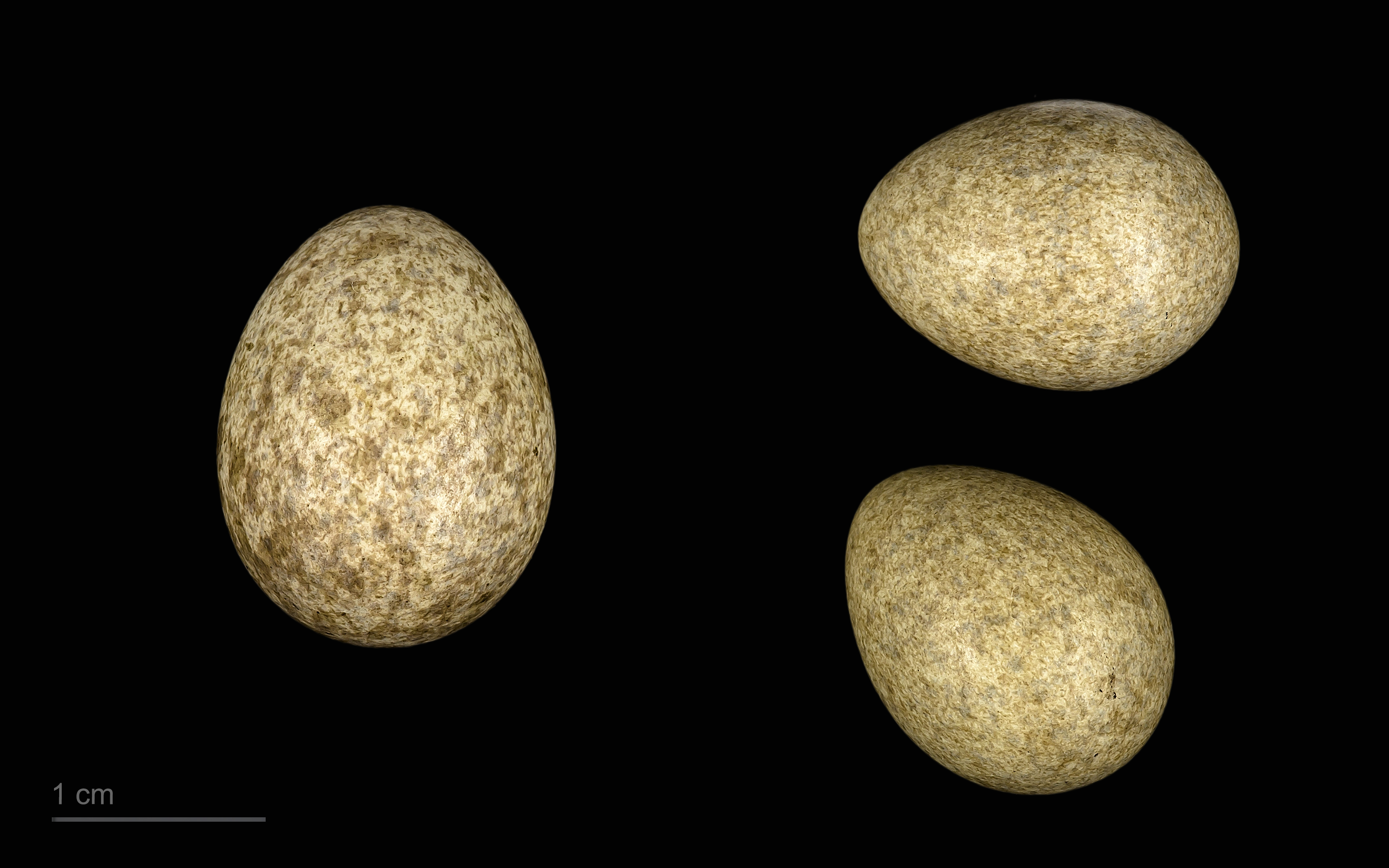
Cuculus canorus canorus (cuckoo) egg in a Curruca sarda clutch- MHNT

Marmora's warbler (Curruca sarda) is a species of passerine bird in the Sylviidae family. The specific sarda is a Latin feminine form for a person from Sardinia.

== Taxonomy ==
Marmora's warbler was formerly described in 1820 by the Dutch zoologist Coenraad Jacob Temminck under the binomial name Sylvia sarda. Temminck based his account on a manuscript by the Italian soldier and naturalist Alberto della Marmora that had been read at the Academy of Turin in August 1819. Marmora's warbler is now one of 27 species placed in the genus Curruca that was introduced by the German naturalist Johann Matthäus Bechstein in 1802. The species is monotypic: no subspecies are recognised.

== Distribution and habitat ==
It breeds on Mediterranean islands, typically including Corsica and Sardinia. The smaller Balearic Islands bird is given specific status as Balearic warbler, Curruca balearica. These two seem to form a superspecies which in turn groups with Tristram's warbler and the Dartford warbler. They are generally resident but some birds migrate south to winter in north Africa. They are rare vagrants to northern and western Europe. These small passerine birds are found in open country with thorny bushes and heather. 3-5 eggs are laid in a nest in a bush. Like most warblers, they are insectivorous.

== Description ==
These are small, long tailed, large-headed birds, overall very similar to their close relatives in the Dartford warbler group. Marmora's warblers are grey above and below, lacking the brick-red underparts of the Dartford warbler. Adult males have darker patches on the forehead and between the eye and the pointed bill. The legs and iris are red. The song is a fast rattle. Immature birds can be confused with young Dartford warblers, which are also grey below, but Marmora's have a paler throat. Their iris is dark.
