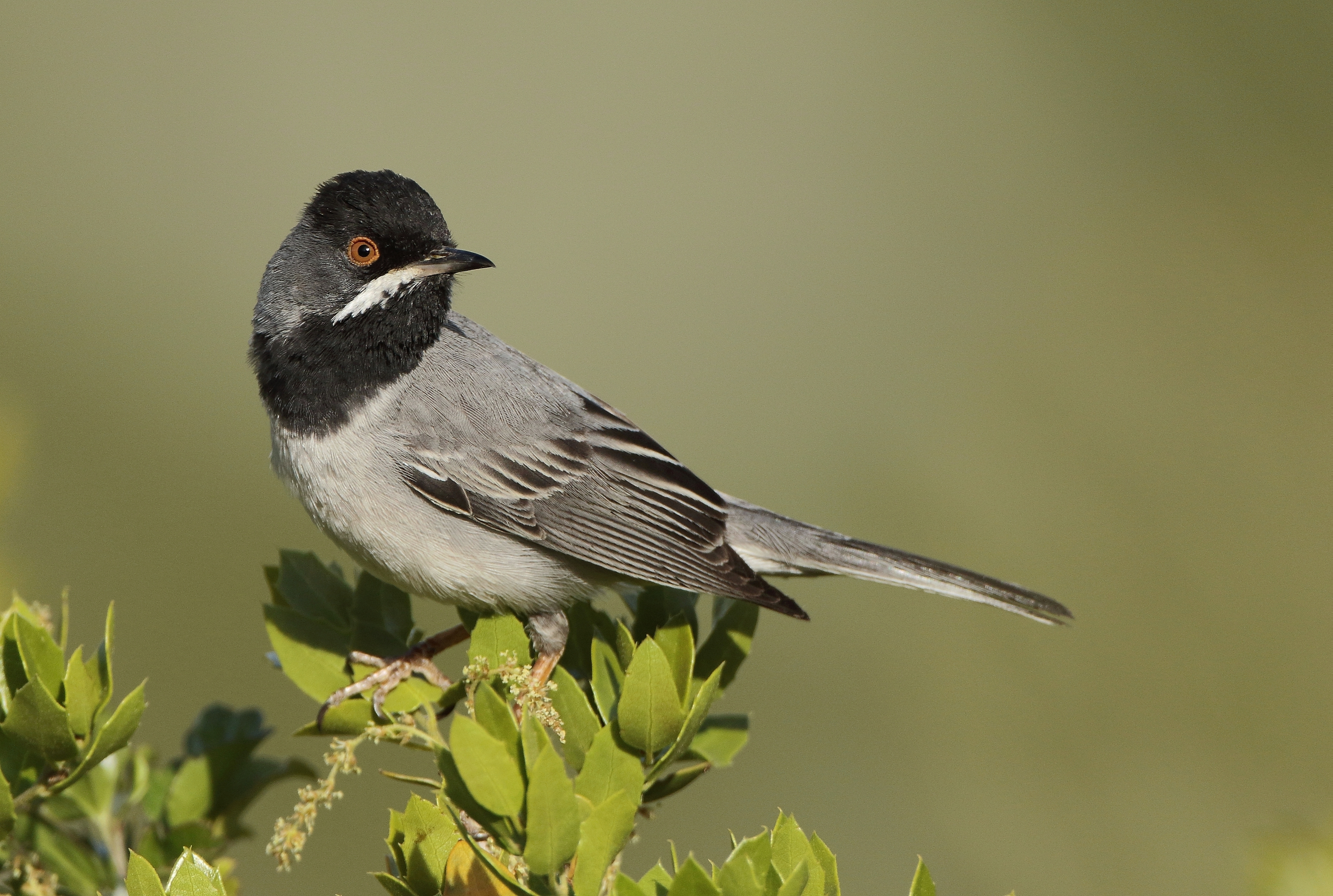

Conservation status
- Least Concern (IUCN 3.1)

Scientific classification
- Kingdom: Animalia
- Phylum: Chordata
- Class: Aves
- Order: Passeriformes
- Family: Sylviidae
- Genus: Curruca
- Species: C. ruppeli

Binomial name
- Curruca ruppeli (Temminck, 1823)

Synonyms
- Sylvia ruppeli; Sylvia rueppelli; Curruca rueppelli

= Rüppell's warbler =

Species of bird

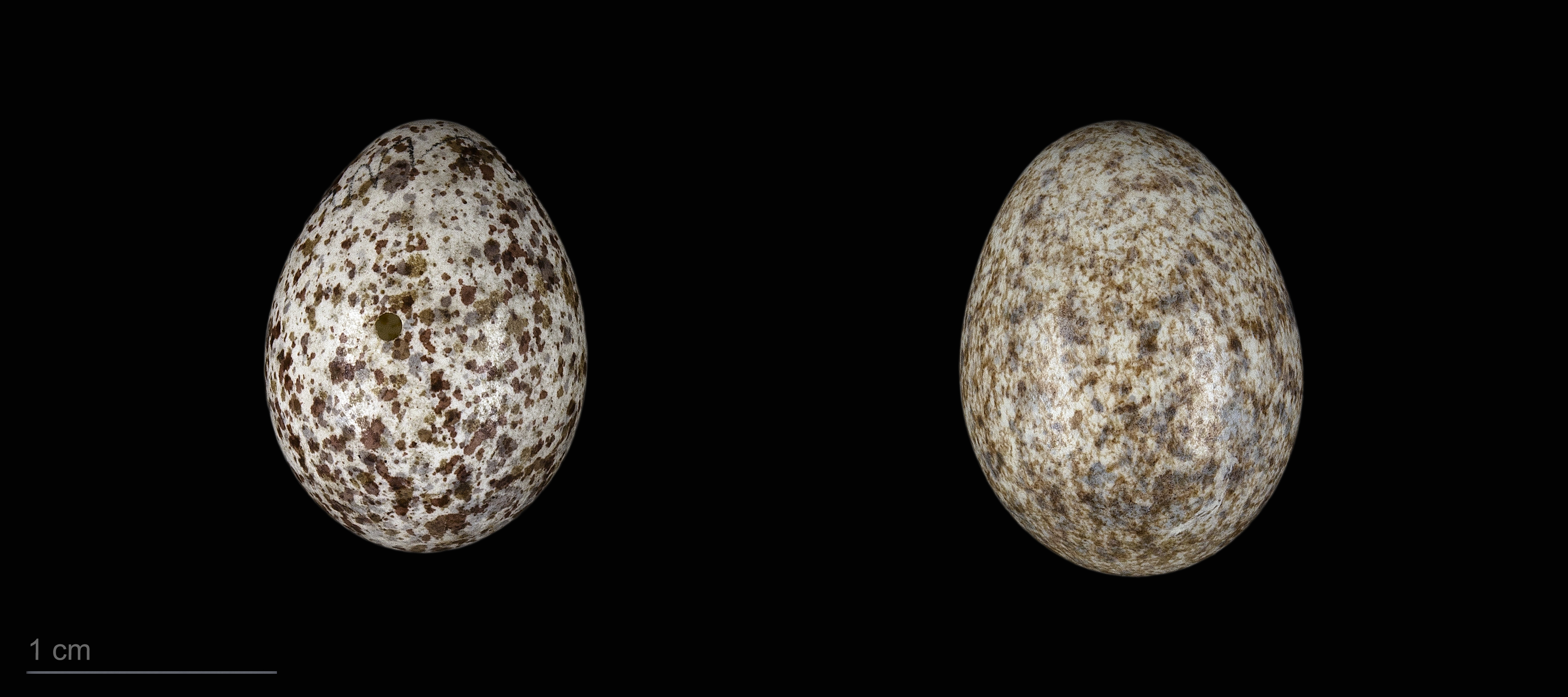
Curruca ruppeli - MHNT

Rüppell's warbler (Curruca ruppeli) is a passerine bird of the genus Curruca. It breeds in Greece, Turkey and neighbouring islands. It is migratory, wintering in northeast Africa. This is a rare vagrant to western Europe. The name is occasionally cited as "Rueppell's warbler".

== Taxonomy and etymology ==
Together with the Cyprus warbler it forms a superspecies with dark throats, white malar streaks and light remigial fringes. This in turn is related to the species of Mediterranean and Middle East Sylvia warblers that have a naked eye-ring, namely the eastern subalpine warbler, Sardinian warbler and Ménétries's warbler. Both groups have a white malar area, but this may not form a clear streak in the latter group; above the white, the heads of males are uniformly dark.

The English name and the specific ruppeli commemorate the German zoologist and explorer Eduard Rüppell (1794–1884).

This is a monotypic species, meaning there are no recognised subspecies.

== Description ==
It is a typical Curruca warbler, similar in size but slimmer than the Sardinian warbler. The adults have a plain grey back and paler grey underparts. The bill is fine and pointed, with brown legs and red eyes. The striking male has a black head and, usually, a black throat, separated by a white malar streak ("moustache"). Females have a pale throat, and the head is grey rather than black. Their grey back has a brownish tinge. The song is a slower, deeper rattle than that of the Sardinian warbler.

== Ecology ==
=== Habitat ===
It breeds in dry and warm environments, including rocky areas, hillsides covered with scrub and maquis, and from sea level to altitudes of approximately 800–1000 meters. In some regions, such as southeastern Turkey, it has been observed at higher elevations up to 1500 meters, and on Crete, up to 1600 meters. This species occupies a diverse range of dry Mediterranean habitats, from forested areas with sufficient undergrowth to maquis with sparse tree cover. It favors open bushy woods of oak and cypress, as well as grassy and rocky terrain with varying densities of scrub cover. Compared to the closely related Sardinian warbler, Rüppell's warbler is less reliant on tall and dense vegetation. During the non-breeding season, it frequents scrubby arid areas, as well as gardens, canebrakes, and hedgerows. On migration, it can be observed on bushy hillsides, mountain slopes, and in desert wadis with Acacia trees.

=== Breeding ===
The nest is a robust cup-shaped structure constructed from grass leaves and stems, often incorporating some vegetable down. The interior is lined with finer materials. Nests are typically situated in dense, often thorny scrub, at heights ranging from 45 to 75 centimeters above the ground. In Greece, egg-laying typically occurs from mid-April to mid-May. Clutches usually consist of four or five eggs.

=== Diet ===
This Insectivore passerine primarily feeds on adult and larval insects. However, its diet likely includes other arthropods as well. During the non-breeding season, it also enriches its diet with berries.

== Status ==
This species has an extensive range and a big population. The population trend is unknown, but it is not believed to be rapid enough to bring it to the threshold of vulnerability. For this reason it is classified as "least concern" on the IUCN Red List.

The European population was estimated at 206,000 to 1,030,000 mature individuals. This represents approximately 95% of the global population, which is preliminarily estimated at 217,000 to 1,080,000 mature individuals.
