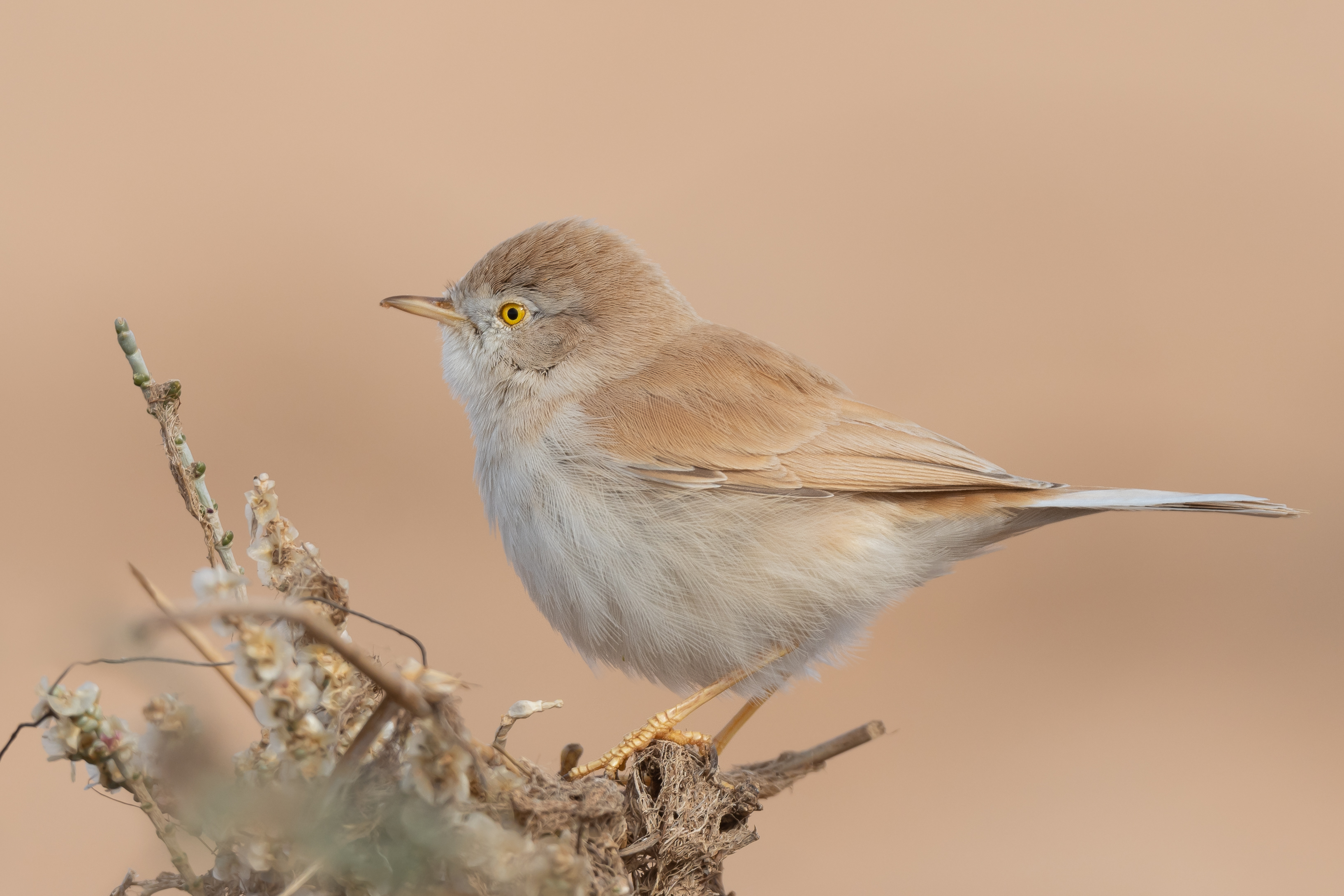

Conservation status
- Least Concern (IUCN 3.1)

Scientific classification
- Kingdom: Animalia
- Phylum: Chordata
- Class: Aves
- Order: Passeriformes
- Family: Sylviidae
- Genus: Curruca
- Species: C. deserti

Binomial name
- Curruca deserti (Loche, 1858)

Synonyms
- Stoparola deserti; Sylvia deserti

= African desert warbler =

Species of bird

The African desert warbler (Curruca deserti) is a species of warbler in the family Sylviidae.

== Taxonomy ==
Until recently it was considered conspecific with the Asian desert warbler (and called just "desert warbler"), but is now given specific status. The two are still each other's closest living relatives, and their relationships to other typical warblers are not clear; they may be fairly close to the common whitethroat. But it seems that all these three taxa are fairly basal members of the genus.

== Distribution and habitat ==
The warbler breeds in the deserts of north-western Africa south of the Atlas Mountains from southern Morocco east to western Libya and south to Mali and Niger. It winters in the same area, and does not migrate other than short distances.

== Description ==
It is a small bird, marginally the smallest in the genus, 11–12 cm long, and 7–10 g weight. The sexes are almost identical in colour, pale sandy yellow-brown above and whitish below; the bill and legs are yellowish, and the eye has a yellow iris; it differs from the Asian desert warbler in its more yellowish overall colour.

== Behaviour ==
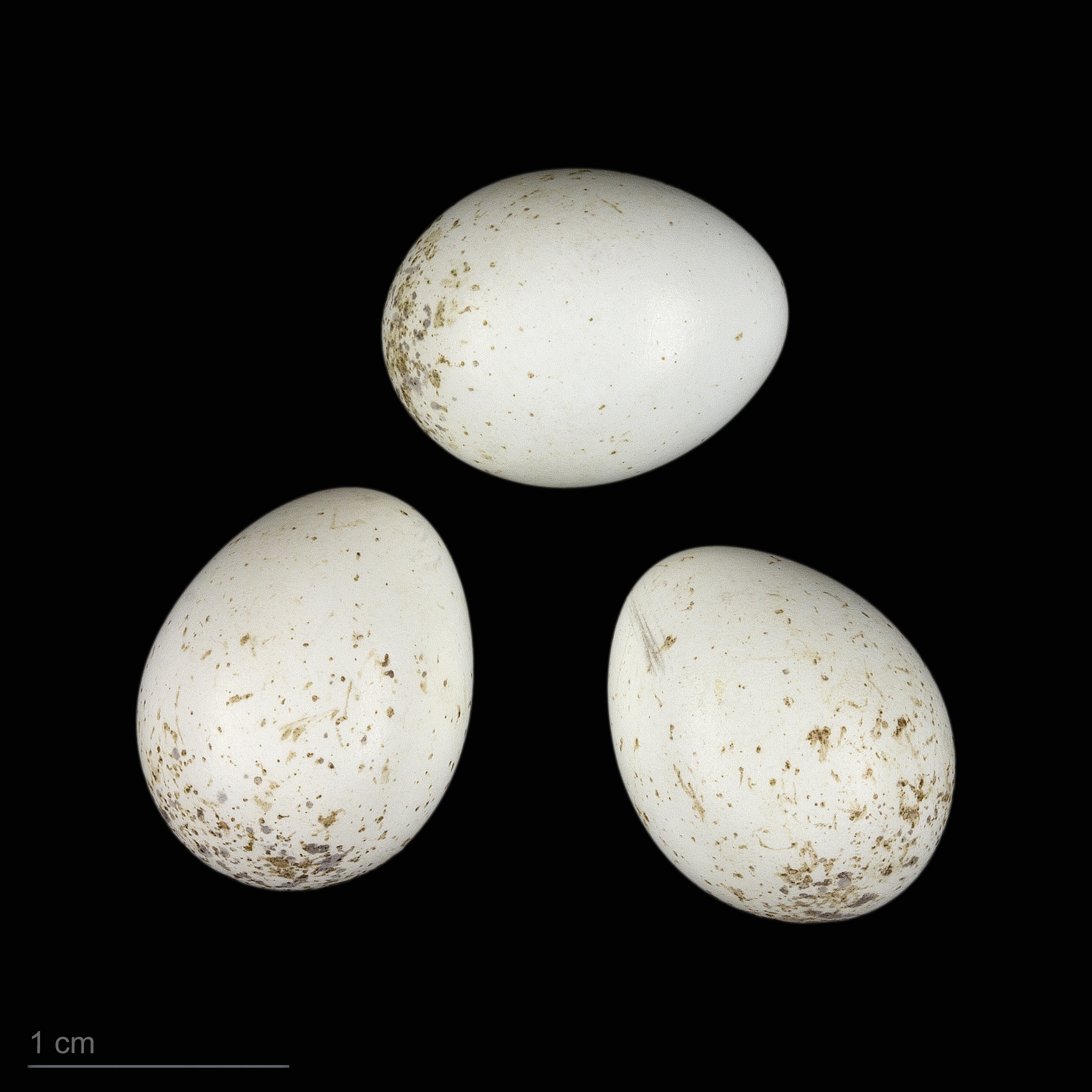
Clutch of 2 to 5 Curruca deserti eggs is typical. - MHNT

Like its relatives, it is insectivorous, but will also take small berries; unlike most warblers, it commonly feeds on the ground. The song is a distinctive jingle often given in an advertisement flight, with clear notes (differing from Asian desert warbler in having few harsh notes). It breeds in desert and semi-desert environments, as long as some scattered bushes for nesting occur. The nest is built in low shrub, and 2–5 eggs are laid.
