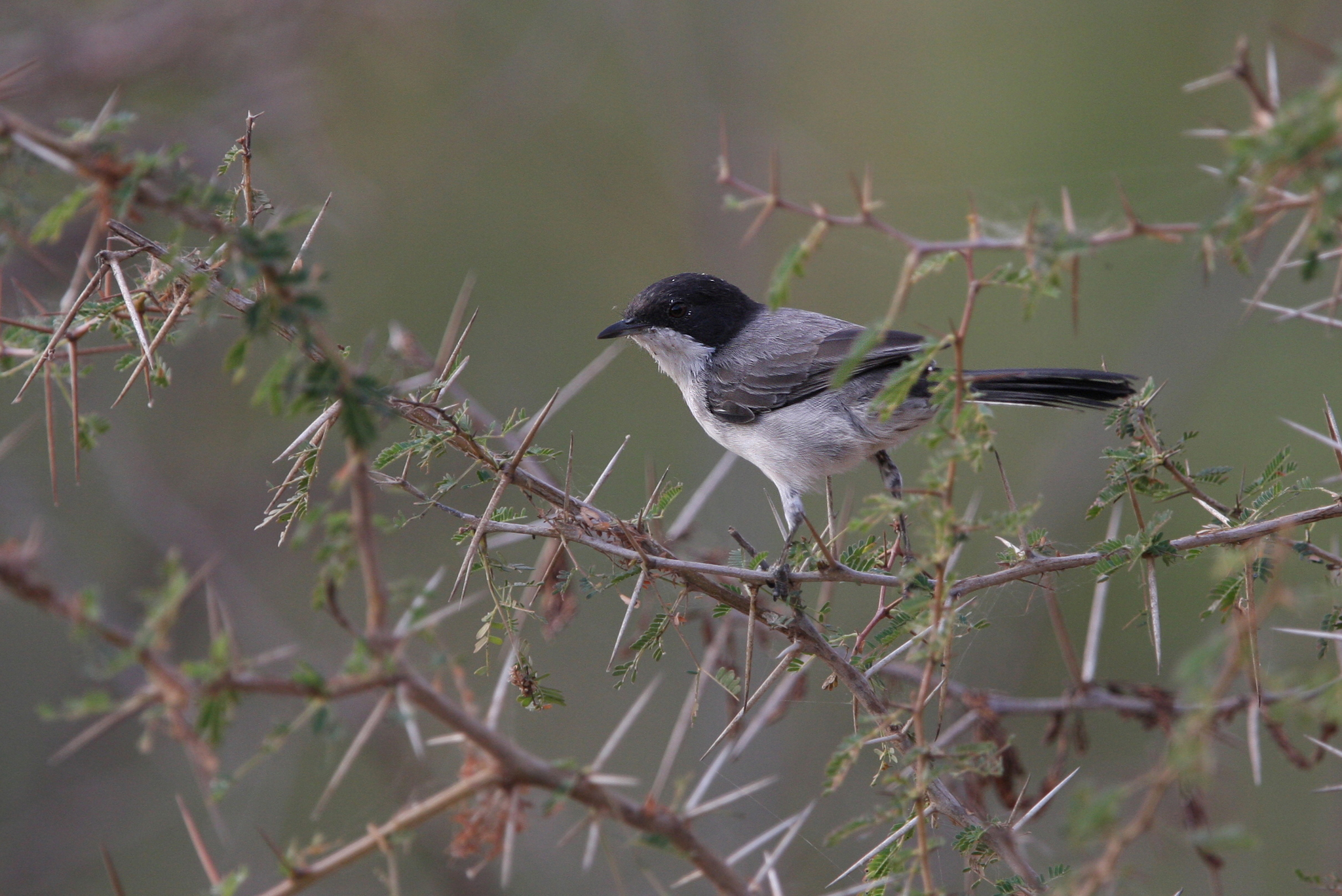

Conservation status
- Least Concern (IUCN 3.1)

Scientific classification
- Kingdom: Animalia
- Phylum: Chordata
- Class: Aves
- Order: Passeriformes
- Family: Sylviidae
- Genus: Curruca
- Species: C. leucomelaena

Binomial name
- Curruca leucomelaena Hemprich & Ehrenberg, 1833

Synonyms
- Sylvia leucomelaena

= Arabian warbler =

Species of bird

The Arabian warbler (Curruca leucomelaena), also known as Red Sea warbler or Blandford's warbler, is a species of Old World warbler in the family Sylviidae. It is found in Djibouti, Egypt, Eritrea, Israel, Jordan, Oman, Palestine, Saudi Arabia, Somalia, Sudan, and Yemen. Its natural habitat is dry savanna country where it is often found in patches of Acacia.

== Taxonomy ==
Four subspecies are recognised; C. l. negevensis, from the Arava Valley in Israel and Jordan; C. l. leucomelaena, from northwestern Saudi Arabia southward to Yemen and then eastward to Oman; C. l. blanfordi, from southeastern Egypt to southeastern Eritrea; and C. l. somaliensis, from Djibouti and northern Somalia.

== Description ==
The Arabian warbler is a large member of its genus, with a length of about 14.5 cm (5.7 in). It has an upright posture, relatively short, rounded wings and a long, graduated tail which it characteristically flicks downwards. The male has a white eye-ring, a blackish-brown hood and tail, greyish-brown upper parts, a whitish throat and pale grey underparts. The female is similar but the hood and tail are chocolate brown and the eye ring is less conspicuous. The song, normally uttered only by the male, is a short melodious, thrush-like bubbling warble, usually sung from an elevated perch, but sometimes sung from cover. The alarm call is a series of quiet "chack"s.

== Behaviour ==
The Arabian warbler forages for insects and small arthropods, and also feeds on berries. Breeding takes place in the spring and there are often two or more broods. In Israel nesting takes place between February and mid-June. This bird is found in arid savannah country where it is particularly associated with Acacia groves.

== Status ==
The International Union for Conservation of Nature has assessed the conservation status of the Arabian warbler as being of "least concern". It has a wide range and is a fairly common species in the African part of its range although rather local in its occurrence. The population trend may be downwards, but it is not declining at such a rate as to warrant listing it in a more threatened category.
