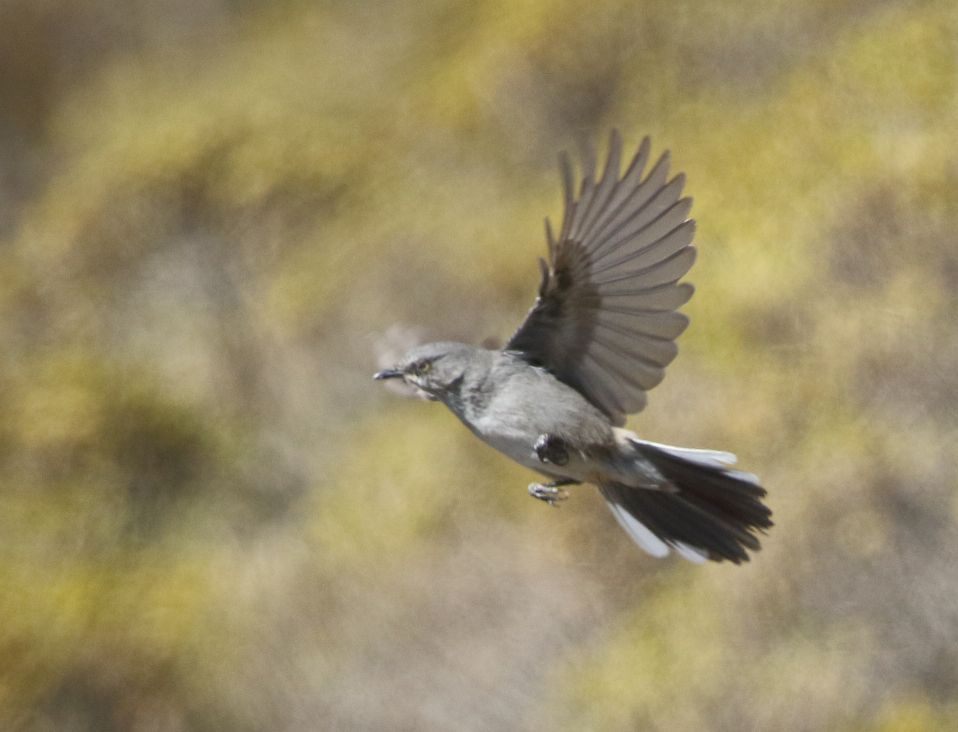
- Near Sani Pass, Lesotho

Conservation status
- Least Concern (IUCN 3.1)

Scientific classification
- Kingdom: Animalia
- Phylum: Chordata
- Class: Aves
- Order: Passeriformes
- Family: Sylviidae
- Genus: Curruca
- Species: C. layardi

Binomial name
- Curruca layardi (Hartlaub, 1862)

Synonyms
- Parisoma layardi; Sylvia layardi

= Layard's warbler =

Species of bird

Layard's warbler (Curruca layardi) or Layard's tit-babbler, is a species of Old World warbler in the family Sylviidae. It is found in Lesotho, Namibia, and South Africa. Its natural habitat is subtropical or tropical dry shrubland.
