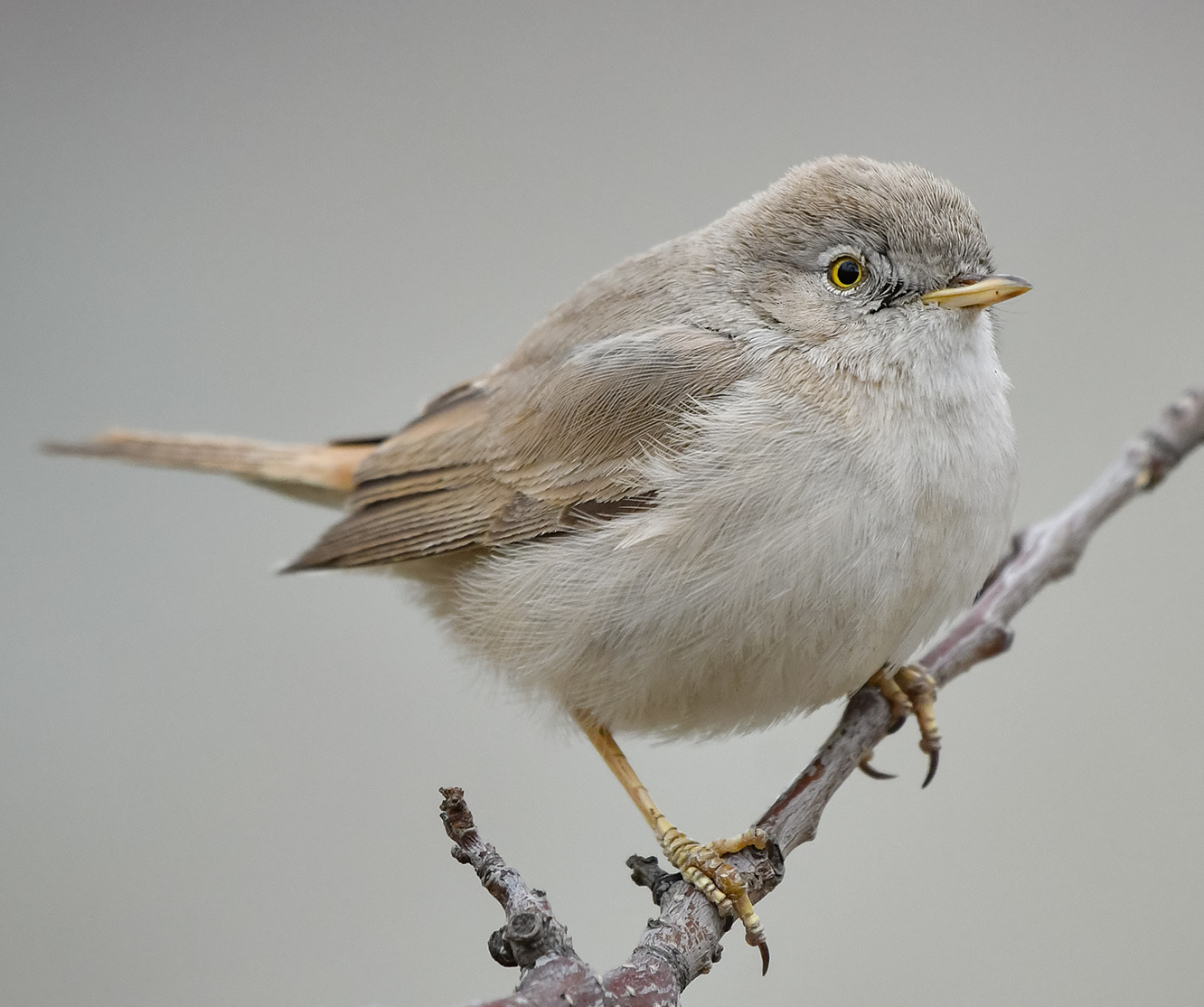

Conservation status
- Least Concern (IUCN 3.1)

Scientific classification
- Kingdom: Animalia
- Phylum: Chordata
- Class: Aves
- Order: Passeriformes
- Family: Sylviidae
- Genus: Curruca
- Species: C. nana

Binomial name
- Curruca nana Hemprich & Ehrenberg, 1833 southern El Tor, Sinai Peninsula

Synonyms
- Sylvia nana theresae

= Asian desert warbler =

Species of bird

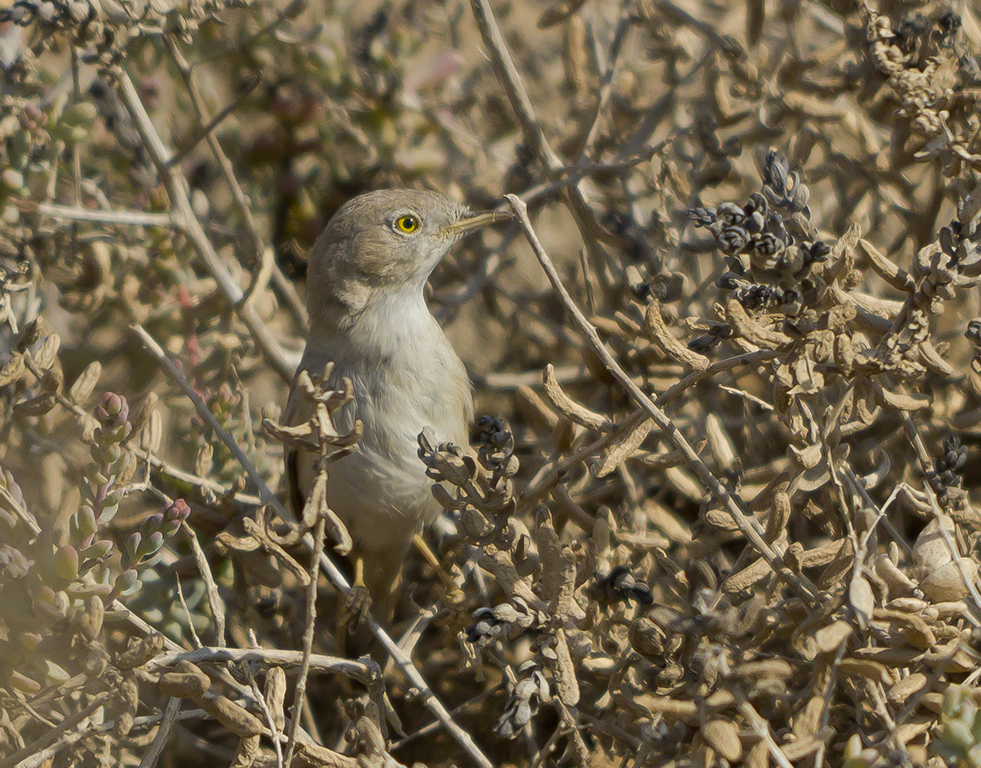
Desert warbler at Kutch

The Asian desert warbler (Curruca nana) is an Old World warbler which breeds in the deserts of central and western Asia and the extreme east of Europe (Volga Delta area east to western Inner Mongolia in China), and migrating to similar habitats in southwestern Asia (Arabia to northwestern India) and the far northeast of Africa (Red Sea coastal regions) in winter. Until recently it was considered conspecific with the African desert warbler (and called just "desert warbler"), but is now given specific status. The two are still each other's closest living relatives, and their relationships to other typical warblers are not clear. They may be fairly close to the common whitethroat; particularly, female whitethroats look much like a richly coloured Asian desert warbler. But it seems that all these three taxa are fairly basal members of the genus.

It is a small bird (the second-smallest in the genus after African desert warbler), 11.5–12.5 cm long. The sexes are almost identical in colour, pale grey-brown above with browner wings and tail, and whitish below; the bill and legs are yellowish, and the eye has a yellow iris. Like its relatives, it is insectivorous, but will also take small berries; unlike most warblers, it commonly feeds on the ground. The song is a distinctive jingle often given in an advertisement flight, with a mix of clear and harsher notes. It breeds in semi-desert and dry steppe environments, as long as some bushes for nesting occur. The nest is built in low shrub, and 4–6 eggs are laid.

It has occurred as a rare vagrant as far west as Great Britain.

The specific nana is Latin for "dwarf", from earlier Ancient Greek nanos.
