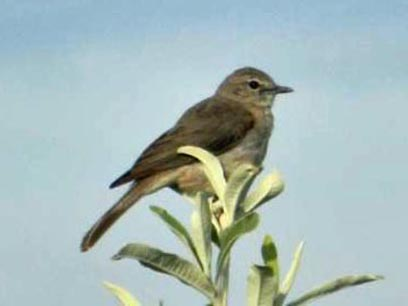
- in Eburu, Kenya

Conservation status
- Least Concern (IUCN 3.1)

Scientific classification
- Kingdom: Animalia
- Phylum: Chordata
- Class: Aves
- Order: Passeriformes
- Family: Sylviidae
- Genus: Curruca
- Species: C. lugens

Binomial name
- Curruca lugens (Rüppell, 1840)

Synonyms
- Parisoma lugens; Sylvia lugens

= Brown parisoma =

Species of bird

The brown parisoma or brown warbler (Curruca lugens) is an Old World warbler of the family Sylviidae found in eastern Africa.
