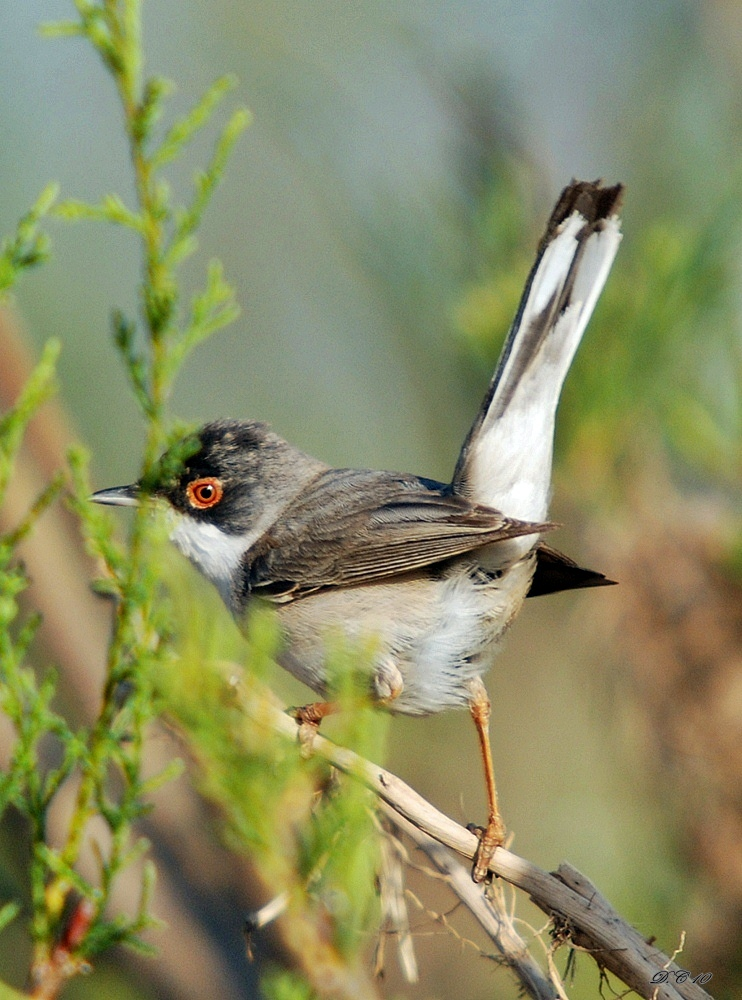

Conservation status
- Least Concern (IUCN 3.1)

Scientific classification
- Kingdom: Animalia
- Phylum: Chordata
- Class: Aves
- Order: Passeriformes
- Family: Sylviidae
- Genus: Curruca
- Species: C. mystacea

Binomial name
- Curruca mystacea (Ménétries, 1832)

Synonyms
- Sylvia mystacea

= Menetries's warbler =

Species of bird

Menetries's warbler or Ménétries's warbler (Curruca mystacea) is a small passerine bird of Southwest Asia belonging to the genus Curruca. The name of the species commemorates Édouard Ménétries, the French zoologist who described the species in 1832. It is closely related to the Sardinian warbler (Curruca melanocephala) of the Mediterranean basin and is similar to it in appearance.

== Description ==
The Menetries's warbler is 12 to 14 cm long with a wingspan of 15 to 19 cm and weighs about 9-11 grams. Its fairly long tail is blackish with white on the outer-feathers and is often held cocked. It is frequently wagged up and down or from side to side. The bill is fairly heavy and is dark with a pinkish patch at the base. There is a pale bare ring around the eye.

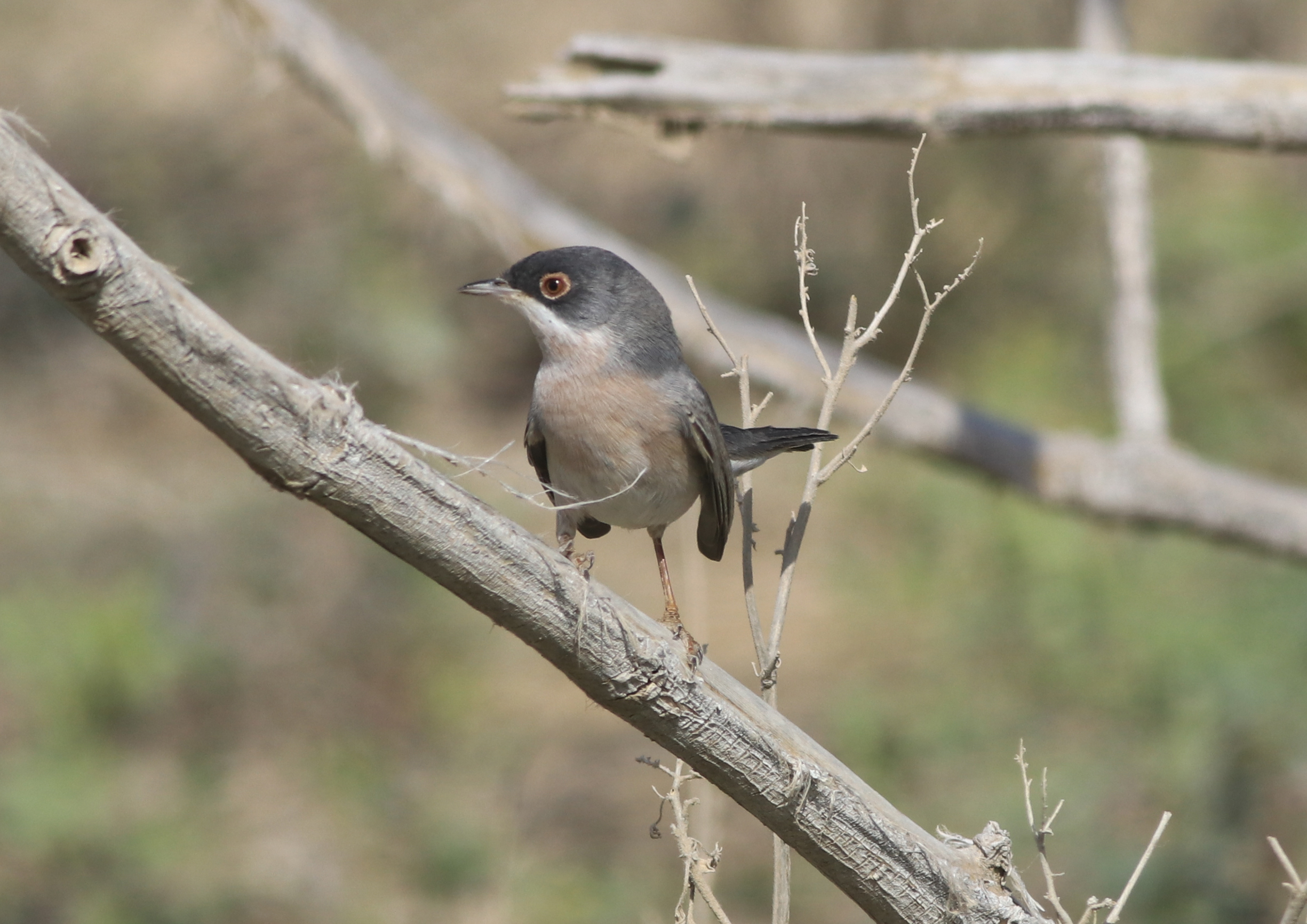
Menetries's warbler (Curruca mystacea) from United Arab Emirates

The male of the nominate subspecies C. m. mystacea is dark greyish above and whitish below with a white submoustachial stripe and a pink throat and breast. It has a dark cap which is dull black at the front but becomes paler further back and merges into the grey nape unlike the Sardininan warbler which has an entirely jet-black cap. Menetries's warblers have rather plain tertial feathers unlike the Sardinian warbler which has tertials with more obvious dark centres and pale edges. The western subspecies S. m. rubescens is paler grey above than the nominate and the pink on the underparts is paler or absent entirely. The eastern subspecies C. m. turcmenica is paler grey above and paler pink below than the nominate and has longer wings than both the other subspecies. Male Menetries's warblers become browner outside the breeding season with a less dark cap.

The female is sandy grey-brown above and buff-white below. It is similar to female Sardinian and eastern subalpine warblers but has plainer tertial feathers and more contrast between the pale back and dark tail. First-winter males are similar to females but may have some pink on the throat and breast.

The species has a harsh, buzzing call, as well as a sparrow-like chattering call. The song of the male is a quiet chattering, which mixes musical and harsh notes and is often given in flight.

== Distribution ==
It is a migratory bird, nesting in Southwest Asia and wintering westwards in Northeast Africa. The subspecies C. m. mystacea breeds from the Caspian Sea region of Russia down through Georgia, Armenia, Azerbaijan and easternmost Turkey to northern Iran. C. m. rubescens breeds locally in south-east Turkey, Syria, Iraq, western Iran and possibly in Lebanon. C. m. turcmenica occurs from north-east Iran eastward to the Syr Darya valley in Central Asia and the Balochistan region in Pakistan.

The winter range covers southern Iran, the Arabian Peninsula and Northeast Africa, from Sudan to Somalia. A few birds pass through Israel and Jordan on migration, and vagrants have been recorded from Portugal, Nigeria and Niger.

== Ecology ==
It occurs in scrub, thickets, open woodland, cultivated areas and gardens in areas with dry, continental climates. It is typically found in steppe regions, on mountain slopes and along rivers and is often associated with tamarisk bushes. It forages among leaves and branches for insects and other invertebrates, starting at the top of a bush and moving downwards. It also feeds on fruit and seeds.

=== Reproduction ===
The cup-shaped nest is built in low vegetation, up to 90 cm above the ground. It is made of twigs, stems and grass leaves with feathers and hair used in the lining. Four or five eggs are laid and are incubated for 11 to 13 days. They are glossy white with brown spots. The young birds fledge after 10 or 11 days. Both sexes are involved in incubating the eggs and caring for the young. They usually raise two broods during the breeding season.

== Status ==
This species has a wide distribution range and a stable population. The global population size has not been quantified, but it is not believed to approach the threshold for vulnerability. For this reasons it assessed at a conservation status of "least-concern" in the IUCN Red List.
