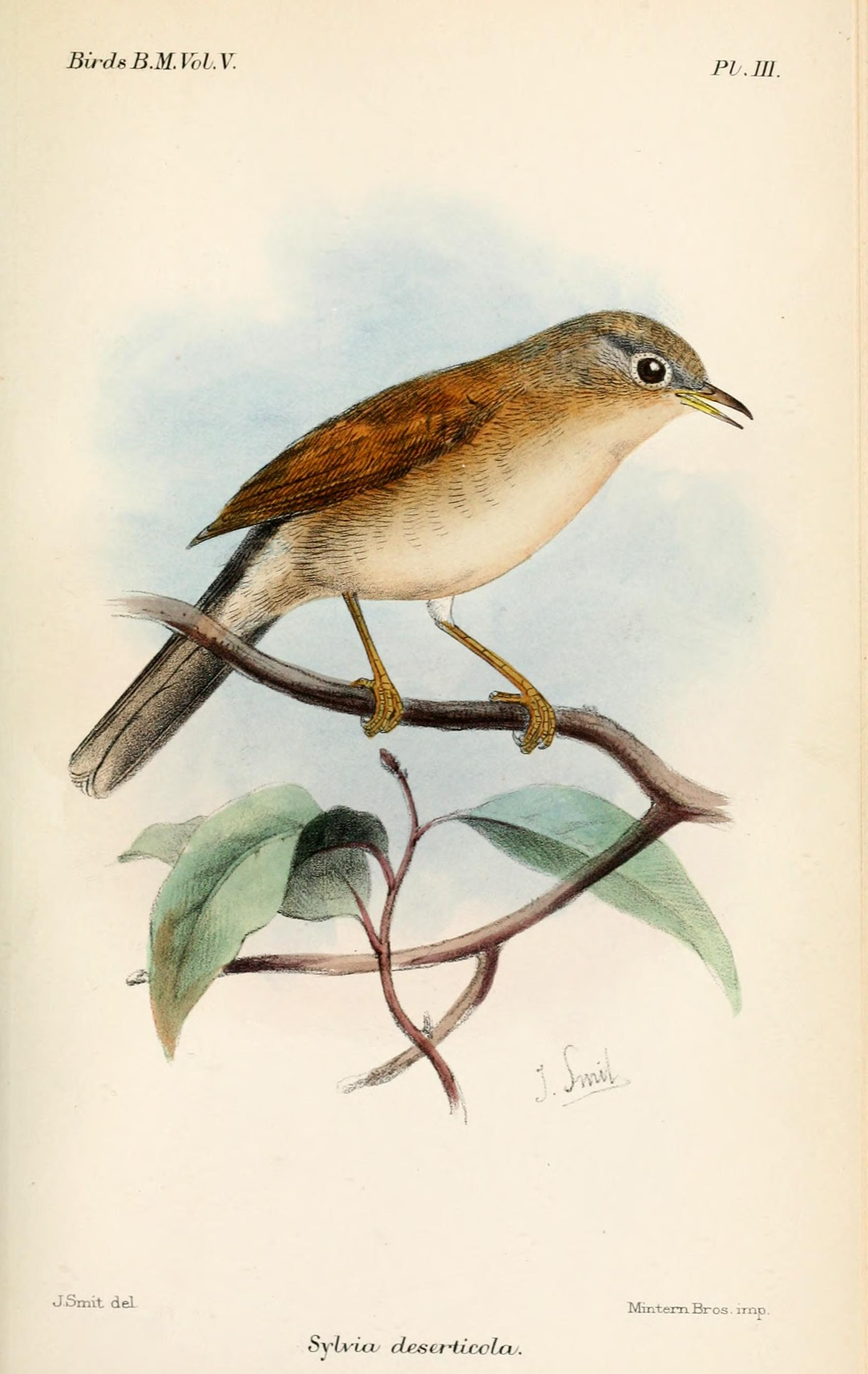

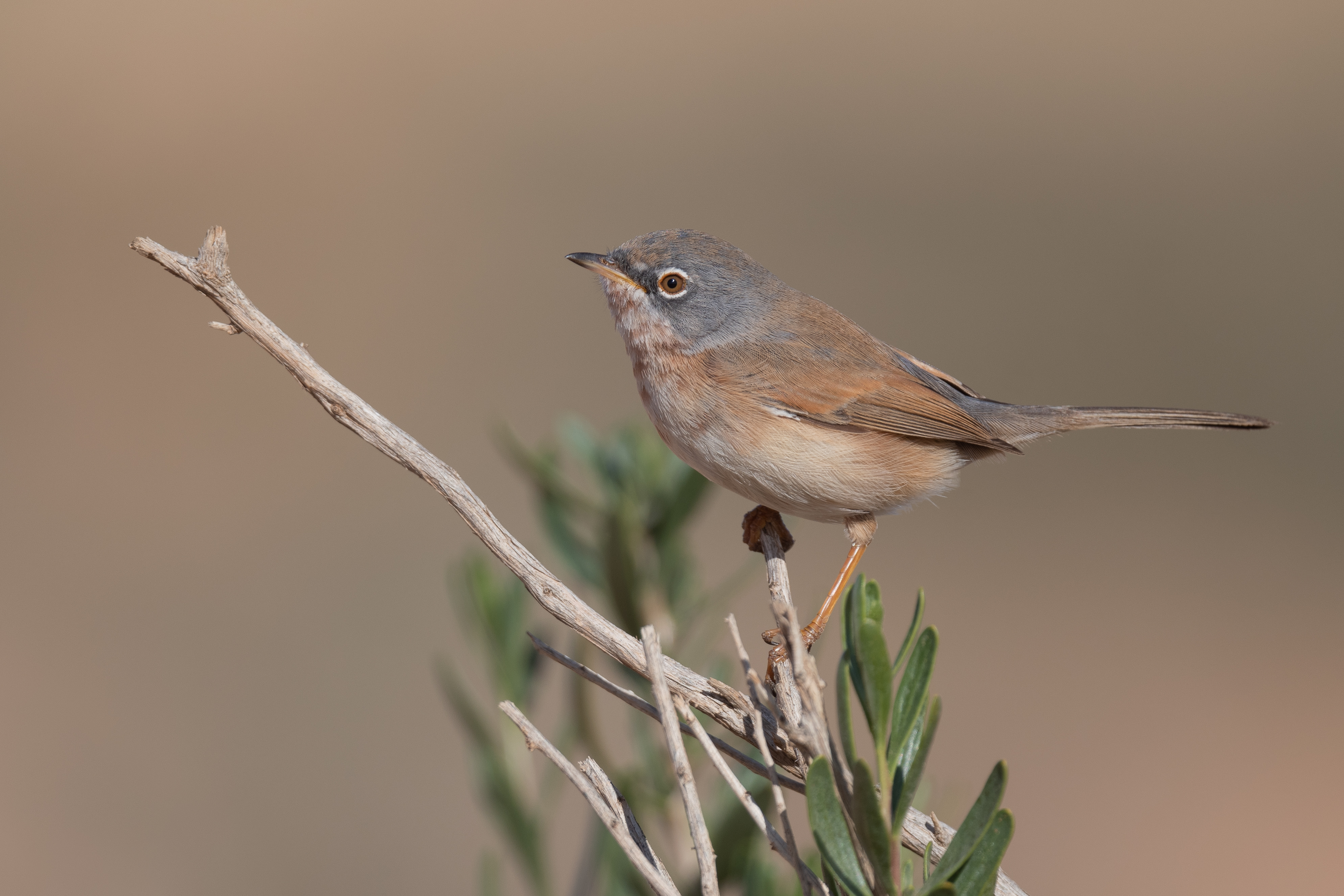

Conservation status
- Least Concern (IUCN 3.1)

Scientific classification
- Domain: Eukaryota
- Kingdom: Animalia
- Phylum: Chordata
- Class: Aves
- Order: Passeriformes
- Family: Sylviidae
- Genus: Curruca
- Species: C. deserticola

Binomial name
- Curruca deserticola (Tristram, 1859)

Synonyms
- Sylvia deserticola

= Tristram's warbler =

Species of bird

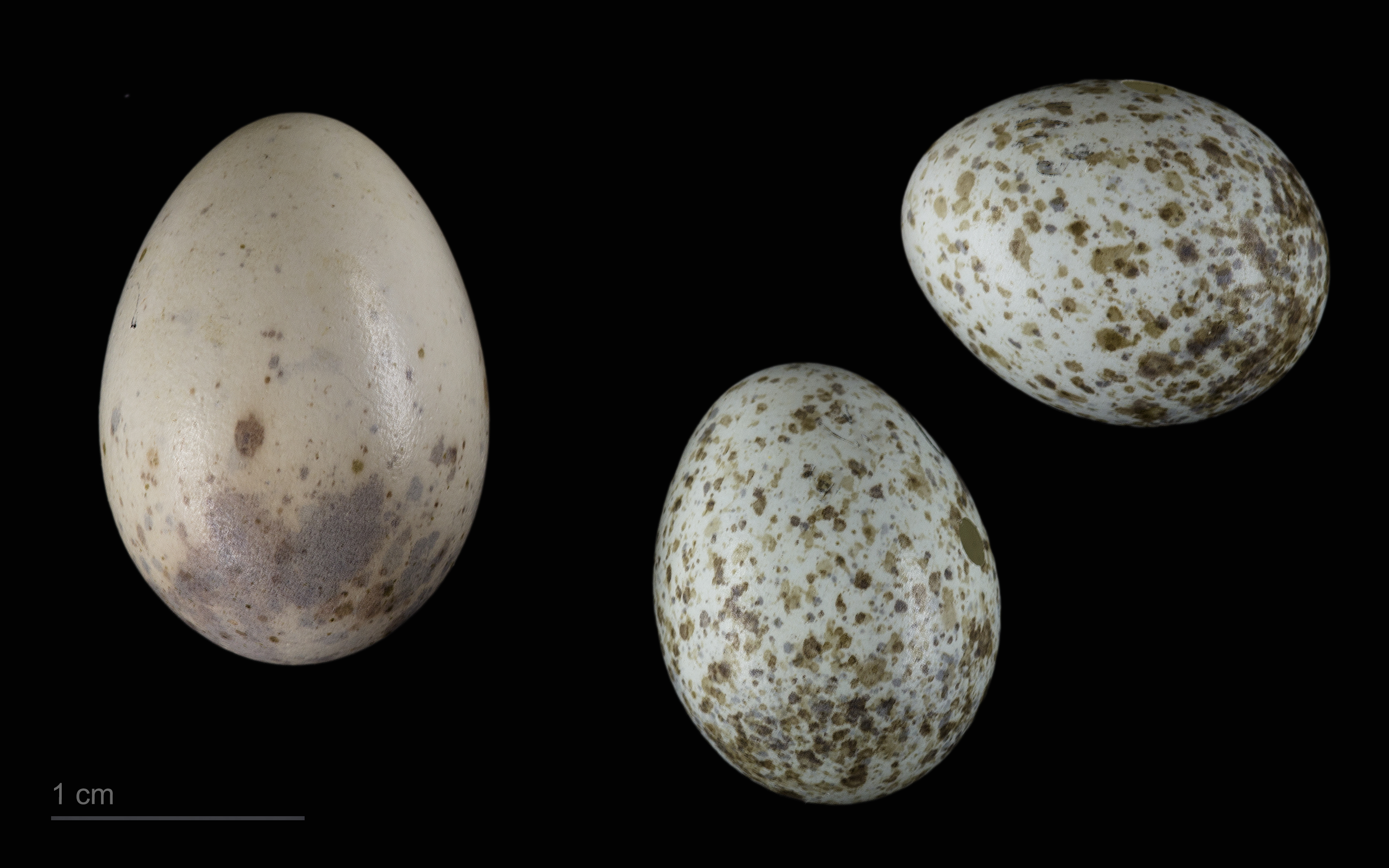
Cuculus canorus bangsi (cuckoo) eggs in a Sylvia deserticola clutch MHNT

Tristram's warbler (Curruca deserticola) is a species of Old World warbler in the family Sylviidae. It is found in Algeria, Libya, Mauritania, Morocco, Tunisia, and Western Sahara. Its natural habitat is subtropical dry shrubland.

The species is named after Reverend Henry Baker Tristram, who also collected natural history specimens.
