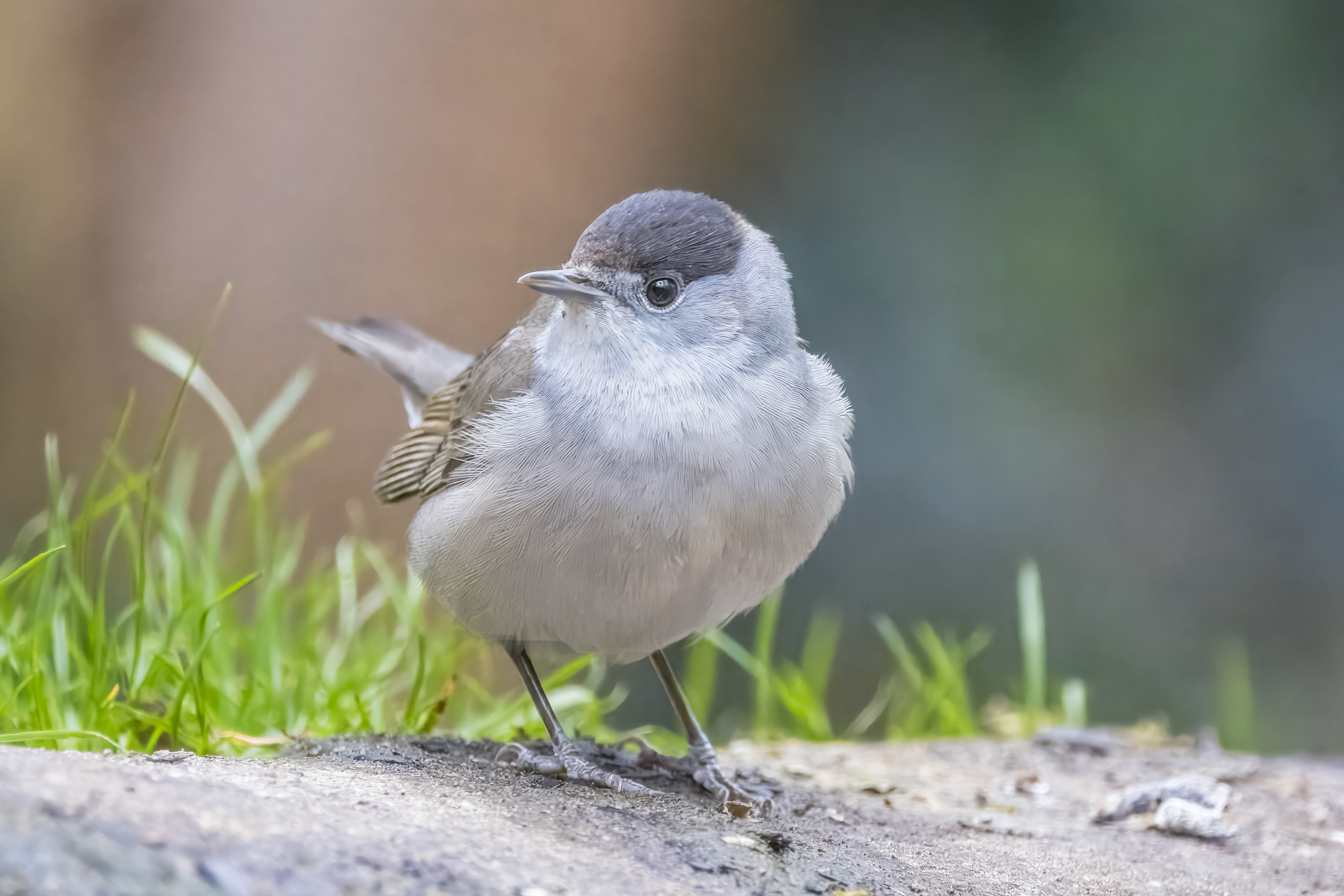
- male
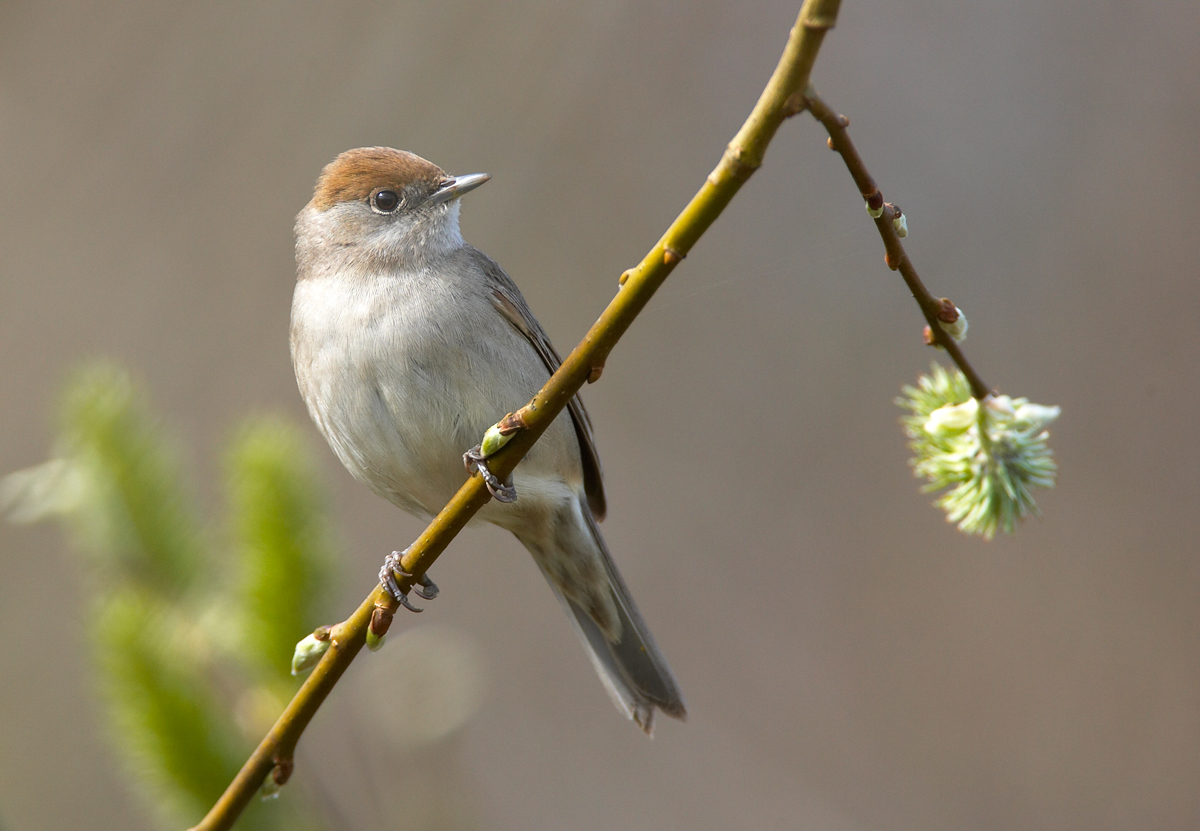
- female

Conservation status
- Least Concern (IUCN 3.1)

Scientific classification
- Kingdom: Animalia
- Phylum: Chordata
- Class: Aves
- Order: Passeriformes
- Family: Sylviidae
- Genus: Sylvia
- Species: S. atricapilla

Binomial name
- Sylvia atricapilla (Linnaeus, 1758)
- Range of S. atricapilla Resident Breeding Non-breeding Passage Probably extinct

Synonyms
- Motacilla atricapilla Linnaeus, 1758

= Eurasian blackcap =

Bird in the Old World warbler family from Eurasia and Africa

The Eurasian blackcap (Sylvia atricapilla) is a bird usually known simply as the blackcap. It is a common and widespread warbler. It has mainly olive-grey upperparts and pale grey underparts, and differences across the five subspecies are small. Both sexes have a neat coloured cap to the head, black in the male and reddish-brown in the female. The male's typical song is a rich musical warbling, often ending in a loud high-pitched crescendo, but a simpler song is given in some isolated areas, such as valleys in the Alps. The blackcap's closest relative is the garden warbler, which looks quite different but has a similar song.

The blackcap breeds in much of Europe, western Asia and northwestern Africa, and its preferred habitat is mature deciduous woodland. The male holds a territory when breeding, which is defended against garden warblers as well as other blackcaps. The nest is a neat cup, built low in brambles or scrub, and the clutch is typically 4–6 mainly buff eggs, which hatch in about 11 days. The chicks fledge in 11–12 days, but are cared for by both adults for some time after leaving the nest. The blackcap is a partial migrant; birds from the colder areas of its range winter in scrub or trees in northwestern Europe, around the Mediterranean and in tropical Africa. Some birds from Germany and western continental Europe have adapted to spending the winter in gardens in Great Britain and Ireland. Insects are the main food in the breeding season, but, for the rest of the year, blackcaps survive primarily on small fruit. Garden birds also eat bread, fat and peanuts in winter.

Despite extensive hunting in Mediterranean countries and the natural hazards of predation and disease, the blackcap has been extending its range for several decades, and is classified by the International Union for Conservation of Nature as least concern. Its rich and varied song has led to it being described as the "mock nightingale" and it has featured in literature, films and music. In Messiaen's opera Saint François d'Assise, the saint is represented by themes based on the blackcap's song.

== Taxonomy ==
The genus Sylvia forms part of a large family of Old World warblers, the Sylviidae. The blackcap and its nearest relative, the garden warbler, are an ancient species pair which diverged very early from the rest of the genus at between 12 and 16 million years ago. In the course of time, these two species have become sufficiently distinctive that they have been placed in separate subgenera, with the blackcap in subgenus Sylvia and the garden warbler in Epilais. These sister species have a breeding range which extends farther northeast than all other Sylvia species except the lesser whitethroat and common whitethroat. The nearest relatives of the garden warbler outside the sister group are believed to be the African hill babbler and Dohrn's thrush-babbler, both of which should probably be placed in Sylvia rather than their current genera, Pseudoalcippe and Horizorhinus respectively.

The blackcap was one of the many bird species originally described by Carl Linnaeus in his landmark 1758 10th edition of Systema Naturae, as Motacilla atricapilla. The current genus name is from Modern Latin silvia, a woodland sprite, related to silva, a wood. The species name, like the English name, refers to the male's black cap. Atricapilla is from the Latin ater, "black", and capillus, "hair (of the head)".

Fossils and subfossils of the blackcap have been found in a number of European countries; the oldest, dated to 1.2–1.0 million years ago, are from the Early Pleistocene of Bulgaria. Fossils from France show that the genus Sylvia dates back at least 20 million years.

=== Subspecies ===
Subspecies (Note: The table is based on Baker (1997). Parentheses indicate that the scientific name has changed from that originally given.)
Subspecies	Authority	Range	Comments
S. a. atricapilla	Linnaeus, 1758	Europe (except Mediterranean area), northwestern Asia; winters northwestern Europe south to tropical western Africa.	The nominate subspecies.
S. a. gularis (syn. S. a. atlantis)	Alexander, 1898	Breeds and winters Azores and Cape Verde	Slightly shorter wing than nominate, greyer underparts and nape.
S. a. heineken (syn. S. a. obscura)	(Jardine, 1830)	Breeds and winters Madeira, Canary Islands, southwestern Iberia, perhaps Morocco, Algeria.	Males are browner above than the nominate subspecies, females are more rufous above, olive below.
S. a. pauluccii	Arrigoni degli Oddi, 1902	Breeds and winters eastern Iberia, Italy, western Mediterranean islands, and perhaps Tunisia.	Like nominate, but greyer above and darker below, white confined to centre of belly.
S. a. dammholzi	Stresemann, 1928	Breeds southwestern Asia and winters tropical eastern Africa.	Like nominate, but longer-winged and paler.

The differences between subspecies are small, making subspecific boundaries hard to define, and the exact distribution of S. a. heineken is unclear, since birds from northwest Africa may be of this form. About 2% of male blackcaps on Madeira and the Azores are melanistic, with black plumage on the whole head and upper breast. Melanistic females are rarer, and are characterised by grey-brown underparts. This dark morph has also been recorded from the Canary Islands, but not from Cape Verde. The melanistic birds were formerly sometimes considered to be a distinct subspecies, S. a. obscura.

== Description ==
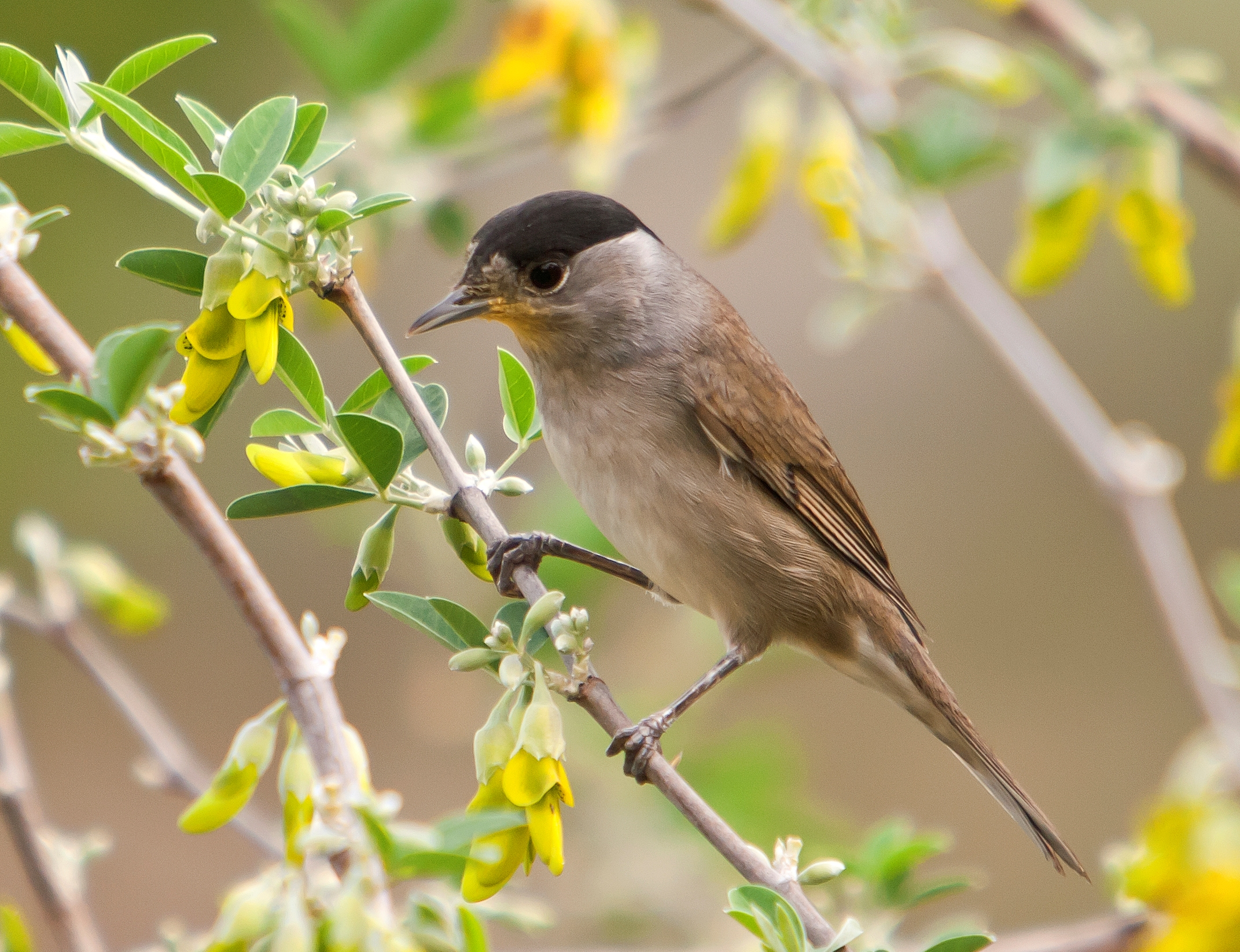
Male S. a. heineken in the Canary Islands, Spain

The blackcap is a mainly grey warbler with distinct male and female plumages. The nominate subspecies is about 13 cm (5.1 in) long with a 7–8 cm (2.8–3.1 in) wing length. The weight is typically 16–25 g (0.56–0.88 oz), but can be up to 31 g (1.1 oz) for birds preparing to migrate. The adult male has olive-grey upperparts, other than a paler grey nape and a neat black cap on the head. The underparts are light grey, becoming silvery white on the chin, throat and upper breast. The tail is dark grey, with an olive tint to the outer edge of each feather. The bill and long legs are grey, and the iris is reddish brown. The female resembles the male, but has a reddish-brown cap and a slightly browner tone to the grey of the upperparts. Juveniles are similar to the female, but their upperparts have a slight rufous tinge, and the breast and flanks have a more olive tone; young males have a darker brown cap than their female counterparts. This species is unmistakable; other dark-headed Sylvia species, such Sardinian and Orphean warblers have extensive black on the head instead of a small cap. They are also larger and have white edges on the tail.

Blackcaps have a complete moult in their breeding areas in August and September prior to migration. Some birds, typically those migrating the greatest distances, have a further partial moult between December and March. Juveniles replace their loosely structured body feathers with adult plumage, starting earlier, but taking longer to complete, than the adults. Blackcaps breeding in the north of the range have an earlier and shorter post-juvenile moult than those further south, and cross-breeding of captive birds shows that the timing is genetically controlled.

=== Voice ===
Song of male, Moscow

Song of a male, Surrey, England

Calls of a male, Surrey, England

The male's song is a rich musical warbling, often ending in a loud high-pitched crescendo, which is given in bursts of up to 30 seconds. The song is repeated for about two-and-a-half minutes, with a short pause before each repetition. In some geographically isolated areas, such as islands, peninsulas and valleys in the Alps, a simplified fluting song occurs, named the Leiern (drawling) song by the German ornithologists who first described it. The song's introduction is like that of other blackcaps, but the final warbling part is a simple alternation between two notes, as in a great tit's call but more fluting. The main song is confusable with that of the garden warbler, but it is slightly higher pitched than in that species, more broken into discrete song segments, and less mellow. Both species have a quiet subsong, a muted version of the full song, which is even harder to separate. The blackcap occasionally mimics the song of other birds, the most frequently copied including the garden warbler and the common nightingale. The main call is a hard tac-tac, like stones knocking together, and other vocalisations include a squeaking sweet alarm, and a low-pitched trill similar to that of a garden warbler.

Male blackcaps will sometimes sing even when incubating, especially with the second brood. This appears to be intended to maintain the bond with the female. Wintering birds in Africa are quiet initially, but start singing in January or February prior to their return north.

== Distribution and habitat ==
=== Distribution ===
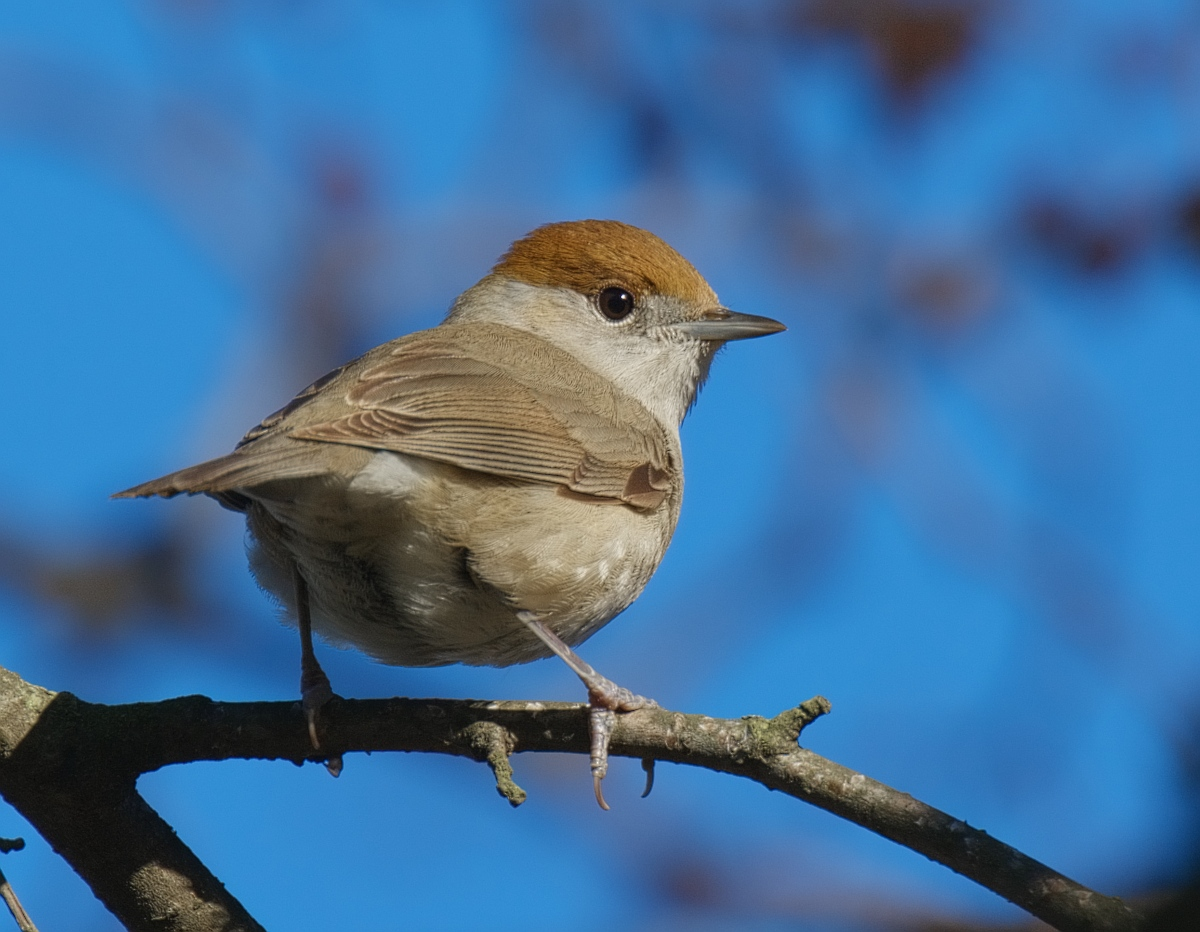
Adult female in Sweden showing reddish brown cap

The continental breeding range of the blackcap lies between the 14–30° July isotherms, and is occupied by the nominate subspecies, the other forms being restricted to islands or fringe areas in the Caucasus and eastern Iberia. Birds on the Mediterranean and Atlantic islands and in the milder west and south of the main Eurasian distribution often winter within the nesting range, but populations elsewhere are migratory. The blackcap is a leap-frog migrant; birds from the north of the breeding range travel furthest south, whereas Mediterranean breeders move much shorter distances. The wintering areas overlap with the breeding range, but also include extensive areas in West Africa, East Africa south to Lake Malawi, and further north in Ethiopia, South Sudan and Eritrea. The large majority of birds wintering in eastern Africa are of the southwest Asian race, S. a. dammholzi.

There is a migratory divide in Europe at longitude 10–11°E. Birds to the west of this line head southwest towards Iberia or West Africa, whereas populations to the east migrate to the eastern Mediterranean and on to East Africa. Cross-breeding in captivity of birds from the resident population on the Canary Islands with migratory blackcaps from Germany showed the urge to migrate is genetically controlled, the offspring showing intermediate behaviour in terms of restlessness at migration time. Similar experiments using birds from southern Germany and eastern Austria, on opposite sides of the migratory divide, demonstrated that the direction of migration is also genetically determined. Climate change appears to be affecting the migration pattern of the garden warbler and blackcap. Both are arriving in Europe earlier than previously, and blackcaps and juvenile (but not adult) garden warblers are departing nearly two weeks later than in the 1980s. Birds of both species are longer-winged and lighter than in the past, suggesting a longer migration as the breeding range expands northwards.

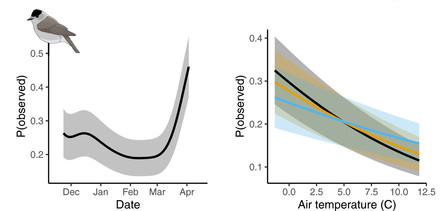
Left graph shows likelihood of individual blackcaps being seen in a garden plotted against date, right graph shows likelihood plotted against air temperature.

In recent decades, substantial numbers of continental European birds have taken to wintering in gardens in Great Britain, and, to a lesser extent, Ireland, where the blackcap was formerly just a summer visitor. Although the British climate is sub-optimal, compensatory factors include the ready availability of food, (particularly from bird tables), a shorter migration distance, and the avoidance of the Alps and the Sahara Desert.

It was originally thought that most of these wintering birds come from Germany, and isotope analysis (which enables the wintering location to be determined) showed that the continental birds wintering in Britain tend to mate only among themselves, and do not usually interbreed with those wintering in the Mediterranean or western Africa. This is because the British migrants arrive back on the breeding grounds earlier than blackcaps wintering around the Mediterranean, and form pairs before the southern birds arrive. Mixed pairings are also selected against because the hybrid young would migrate in an intermediate direction, which would take them into the Bay of Biscay.

It now appears that the wintering birds in the UK come from a much wider area than previously thought. The majority come from France, and some individuals come from as far away as Spain and Poland. The steady supply of winter food in gardens gives even Spanish-breeding birds an opportunity to put on weight quicker than in their home range.

A 2021 paper showed that blackcaps, particularly adults, wintering in Britain and Ireland showed high site fidelity and low movement between wintering sites, in contrast to blackcaps wintering in their traditional winter ranges. Adults that frequented gardens had better body condition, smaller fat stores, longer bills, and rounder wing tips. The bill and wing tip shapes reflected a more generalist diet than that of birds in traditional winter sites.

Blackcaps did not exclusively feed in gardens; visits were linked to harsher weather. Individuals generally stayed at garden sites until immediately before spring departure, and supplemental feeding may have benefits for winter survival, When preparing for migration, abundant supplemental food may allow blackcaps to attain better body condition and may facilitate earlier and more successful breeding attempts.

In the Iberian Peninsula, migratory blackcaps (and European robins) track similar climatic conditions over the season, which sedentary individuals must cope with great variation in climate over the year. This suggests a trade-off between the cost of travelling long distances of migrants, and the flexibility required by sedentary individuals to tolerate a wide variety of environmental conditions.

=== Habitat ===
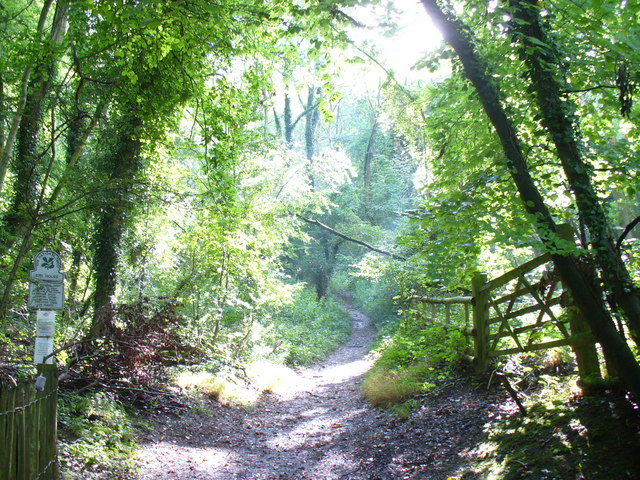
Deciduous woodland is the preferred breeding habitat.

The blackcap's main breeding habitat is mature deciduous woodland, with good scrub cover below the trees. Other habitats, such as parks, large gardens and overgrown hedges, are used as long as they meet the essential requirements of tall trees for songposts and an established understory. Where other Sylvia warblers also breed, blackcaps tend to use taller trees than their relatives, preferably those with a good canopy, such as pedunculate oak. In prime habitat, breeding densities reach 100–200 pairs per square kilometre (250–500 pairs per square mile) in northern Europe, and 500–900 pairs per square kilometre (1,250–2,250 pairs per square mile) in Italy. Densities are much lower in poorer habitats such as conifer forests. Breeding occurs in Europe at altitudes up to 2,200 m (7,200 ft).

The preferred winter habitat around the Mediterranean is scrub and olive orchards, where densities approach the levels found in the best breeding areas. The British wintering population is atypical, with 95% found in gardens, mostly in towns at altitudes below 100 m (330 ft). In Africa, habitats include cultivated land, acacia scrub, mangroves and forest, and these warblers are found at altitudes up to 3,600 m (11,800 ft) in the east of the continent. Wintering birds wander in search of good fruit supplies, but often stay in good feeding areas, and return in subsequent winters. Migrants may occur in a wide variety of habitats, such as reed bed and fen, but show a preference for shrubland.

== Behaviour ==
=== Territory ===
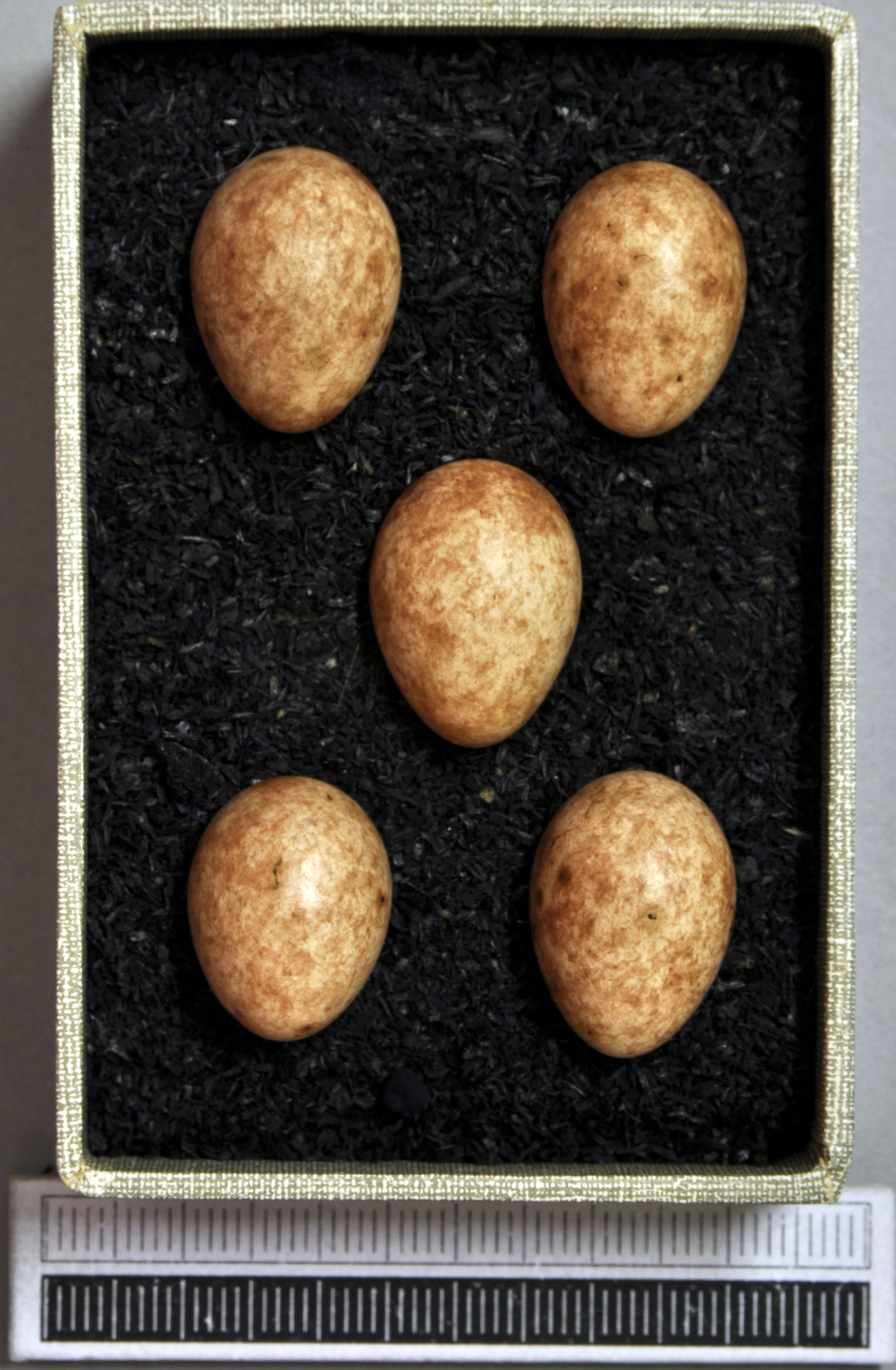
Eggs, Collection Museum Wiesbaden, Germany

When male blackcaps return to their breeding areas, they establish a territory. Adults that have previously bred return to the site they have used in previous summers, whereas inexperienced birds either wander until they find a suitable area, or establish a very large initial territory which contracts under pressure from neighbours. Territorial boundaries are established initially by loud singing, performed while the male displays with his crown raised, tail fanned and slow wingbeats. This display is followed, if necessary, by a chase, often leading to a fight. The typical territory size in a French study was 1.12 hectares (2.8 acres), but in insect-rich tall maquis in Gibraltar, the average was only 0.16 hectares (0.40 acres). Females feed within a home range which may overlap other blackcap territories, and covers up to six times the area of the defended zone.

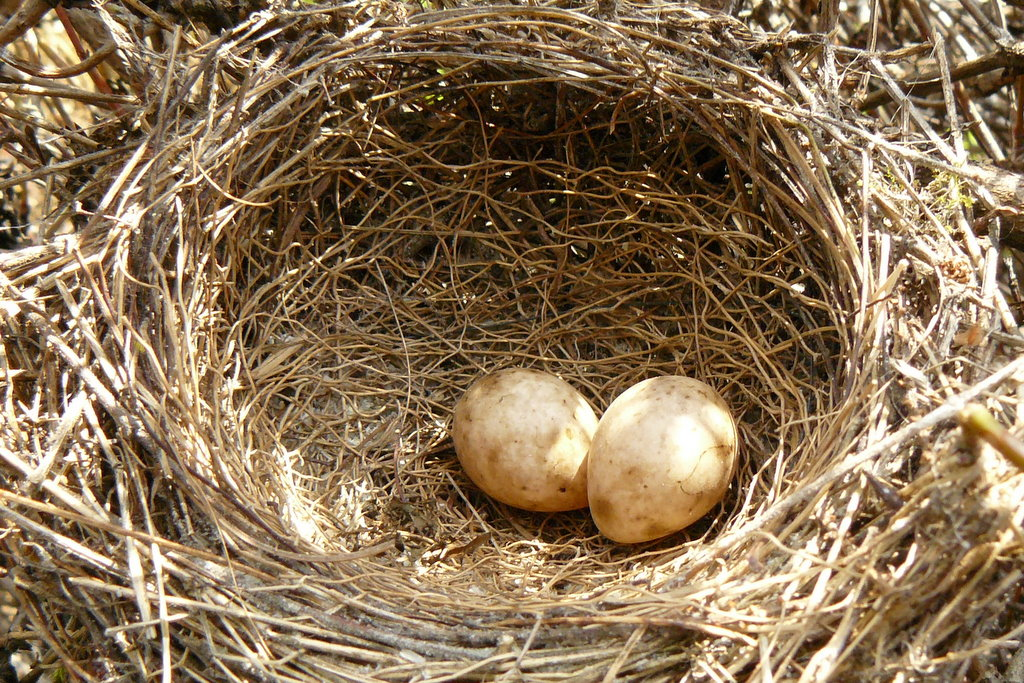
The eggs normally take about 11 days to hatch.

Sylvia warblers are unusual in that they vigorously defend their territories against other members of their genus as well as conspecifics. Blackcaps and garden warblers use identical habits in the same wood, yet aggressive interactions mean that their territories never overlap. Similar songs are a feature of the Sylvia warblers as a group, and it has been suggested that this promotes interspecific competition and helps to segregate territories between related species. It appears more likely from later studies that segregation of sympatric species, other than the blackcap and garden warbler, is due to subtle habitat preferences rather than interspecies aggression.

=== Breeding ===
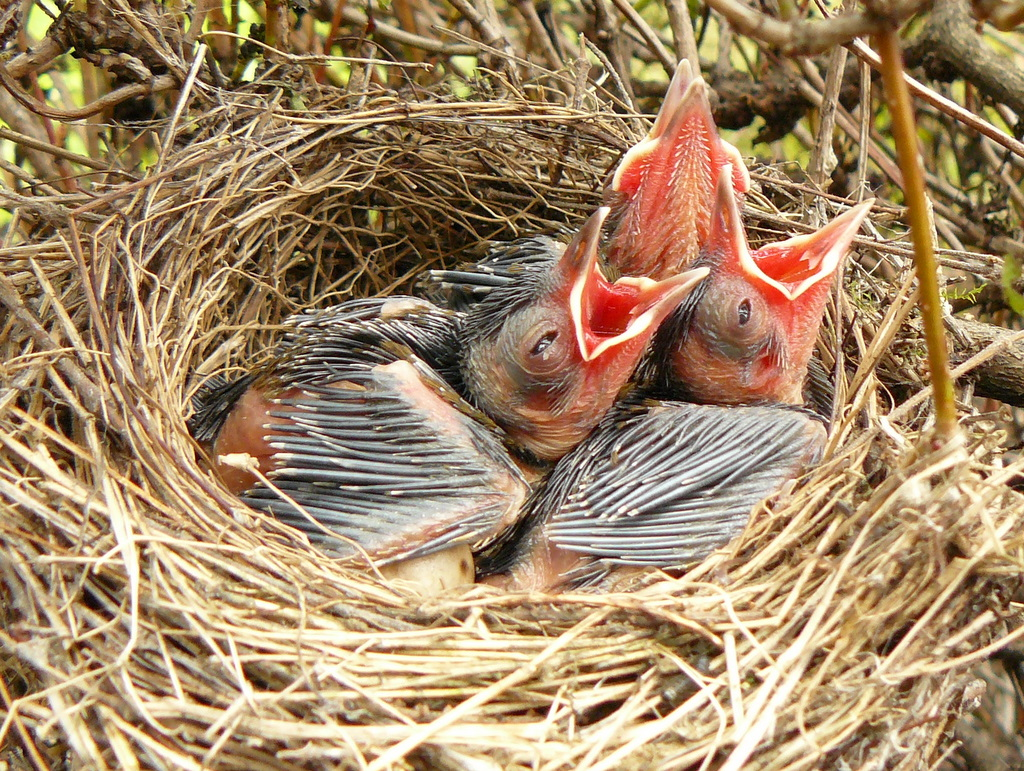
Young chicks begging for food. These are still largely unfeathered.

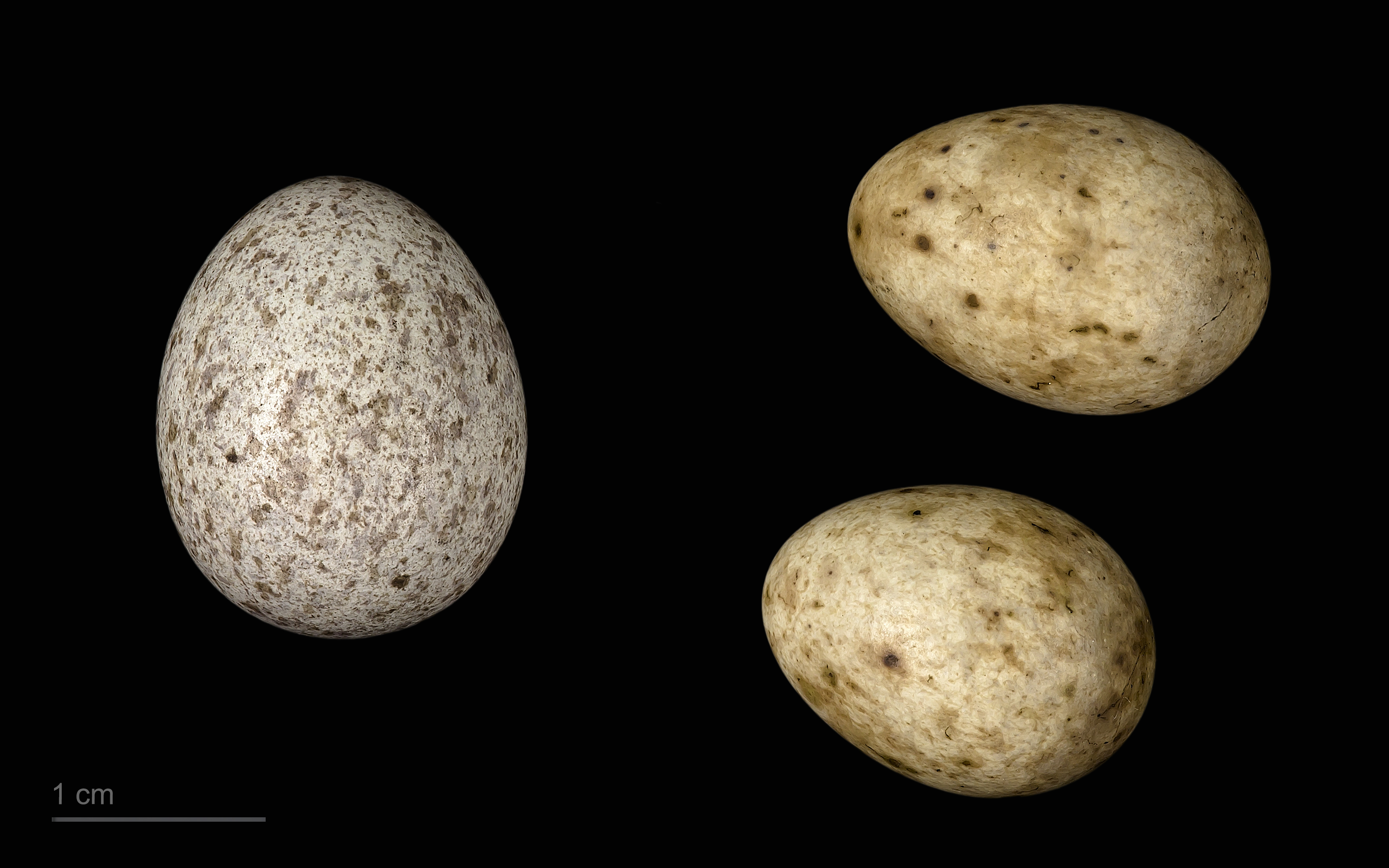
Cuculus canorus bangsi in a clutch of Sylvia atricapilla – MHNT

Blackcaps first breed when they are one year old, and are mainly monogamous, although both sexes may sometimes deviate from this. A male attracts a female to his territory through song and a display involving raising the black crown feathers, fluffing the tail, slow wingbeats, and a short flapping flight. He also builds one or more simple nests (cock nests), usually near his songpost. The final nest, which may be one of the cock nests or built from scratch, is a neat cup of roots, stems and grasses lined with fine material such as hair. The nest is typically 5.5 cm (2.2 in) deep and 10 cm (3.9 in) across, and is built in the cover of bramble, scrubs or trees. It is constructed mainly by the female, and may be up to 4.5 m (15 ft) above the ground, although lower than 1 m (3.3 ft) is more typical. The clutch is typically 4–6 eggs (range 2–7), which are usually buff with grey and brown blotches and a few dark brown spots. The average size of the egg is 19.7 mm × 14.7 mm (0.78 in × 0.58 in).

The eggs are incubated for an average of 11 days (range 10–16). Both adults incubate, although only the female stays on the nest at night. The chicks are altricial, hatching naked and with closed eyes, and are fed by both parents. They fledge about 11–12 days after hatching, leaving the nest shortly before they are able to fly. They are assisted with feeding for a further two or three weeks. If the nest is threatened, the non-incubating bird gives an alarm call so that the sitting parent and chicks stay still and quiet. A male blackcap may mob a potential predator, or try to lure it away with disjointed runs and flaps on the ground. The blackcap normally raises just one brood, but second nestings are sometimes recorded, particularly in the milder climate of the Mediterranean and the Atlantic islands; triple brooding has been observed once, the female laying a total of 23 eggs in the season.

Of eggs laid, 65–93% hatch successfully, and 75–92% of the chicks go on to fledge. (Note: Hatching; Italy 65%; UK 76%, eastern Germany 93%. Fledging; Italy 75%; UK 80%, eastern Germany 92%.) The productivity (young fledged per nest) varies with location, level of predation and quality of habitat, but the national figure for the UK was 2.5. The adult annual survival rate is 43% (males 46%, females 29%), and 36% of juveniles live through their first year. The typical life expectancy is two years, but the record is 13 years and 10 months for a bird in the Czech Republic.

=== Feeding ===
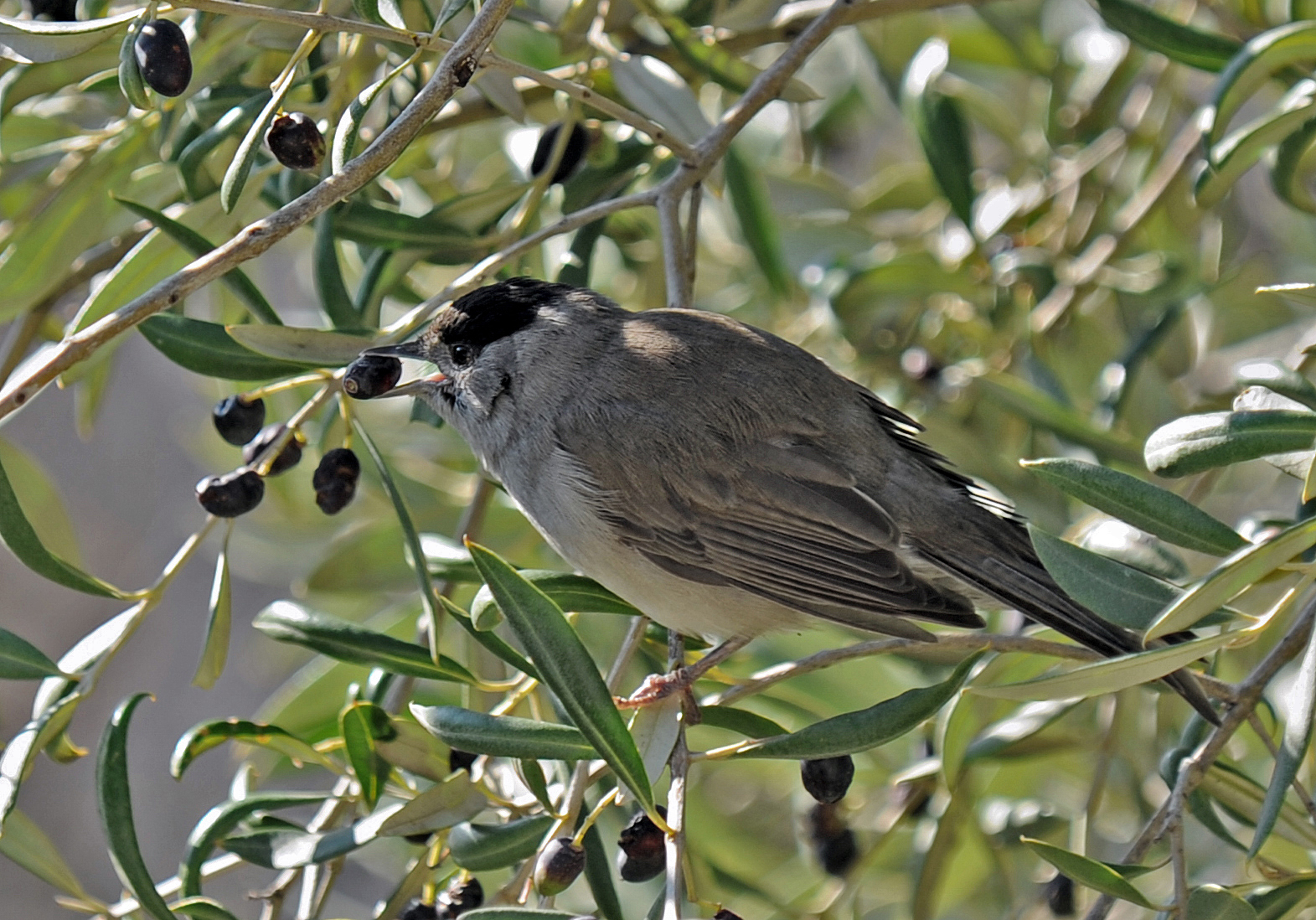
Male eating an olive from a tree in France in December

The blackcap feeds mainly on insects during the breeding season, then switches to fruit in late summer, the change being triggered by an internal biological rhythm. When migrants arrive on their territories they initially take berries, pollen and nectar if there are insufficient insects available, then soon switch to their preferred diet. They mainly pick prey off foliage and twigs, but may occasionally hover, flycatch or feed on the ground. Blackcaps eat a wide range of invertebrate prey, although aphids are particularly important early in the season, and flies, beetles and caterpillars are also taken in large numbers. Small snails are swallowed whole, since the shell is a source of calcium for the bird's eggs. Chicks are mainly fed soft-bodied insects, fruit only if invertebrates are scarce.

In July, the diet switches increasingly to fruit. The protein needed for egg-laying and for the chicks to grow is replaced by fruit sugar which helps the birds to fatten for migration. Aphids are still taken while they are available, since they often contain sugars from the plant sap on which they feed. Blackcaps eat a wide range of small fruit, and squeeze out any seeds on a branch before consuming the pulp. This technique makes them an important propagator of mistletoe, which requires this location for its seeds. The mistle thrush, which also favours that plant, is less beneficial since it tends to crush the seeds or deposit them in its dropping in unviable locations. Although any suitable fruit may be eaten, some have seasonal or local importance; elder makes up a large proportion of the diet of northern birds preparing for migration, and energy-rich olives and lentisc are favoured by blackcaps wintering in the Mediterranean.

The continental birds wintering in British gardens rely on provided food, and the major items are bread and fat, each making up around 20% of the diet; one bird survived the whole winter eating only Christmas cake. Fruit is also eaten, notably cotoneaster (41% of the fruit consumed), ivy and honeysuckle, and apple if available. Some birds have learned to take peanuts from feeders. Blackcaps defend good winter food sources in the wild, and at garden feeding stations they repel competitors as large as starlings and blackbirds. Birds occasionally become tame enough to feed from the hand.

== Predators and parasites ==
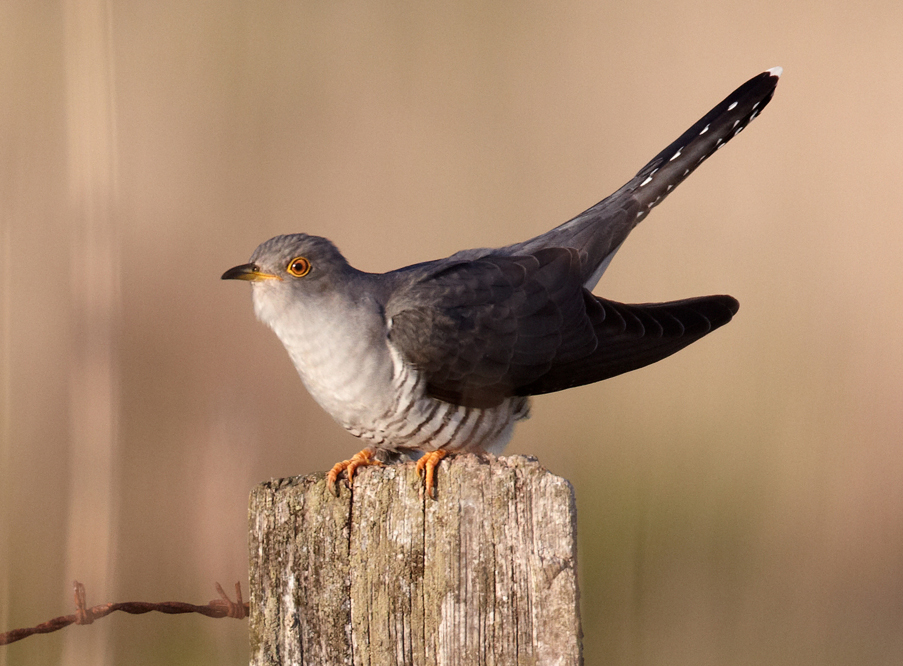
The common cuckoo is an occasional brood parasite of the blackcap.

Blackcaps are caught by Eurasian sparrowhawks in the breeding range, and by Eleonora's falcons on migration. Eurasian jays and Eurasian magpies take eggs and young, as do mammals such as stoats, weasels and squirrels. Domestic cats are the most important predator, possibly killing up to 10% of blackcaps. Blackcaps are occasionally hosts of the common cuckoo, a brood parasite. The level of parasitism is low because the cuckoo's eggs are often rejected. Blackcaps have evolved adaptations which make it difficult for the parasitic species to succeed, despite the cuckoo's tendency to lay eggs which resemble those of their host. Blackcaps are good at spotting alien eggs, and their own eggs are very alike within a clutch, making it easier to spot the intruder. There is, however, considerable variation between different clutches, making it harder for the cuckoo to convincingly mimic a blackcap egg. The open habitat and cup nest of the warbler make it a potential target for the cuckoo; it may have experienced much higher levels of parasitism in the past, and countermeasures would have spread rapidly once they evolved.

The only blood parasites found in a study of blackcaps trapped on migration were protozoans from the genera Haemoproteus and Plasmodium. The study concluded that 45.5% of the males and 22.7% of the females were affected, but the number of parasites was small, and the ability to store fat for the migration flight was unimpaired. Seventeen strains of H. parabelopolskyi are found only in the blackcap, and form a monophyletic group; three further members of that group are found only in the garden warbler, and another three occur in the African hill babbler, supporting the shared ancestry of the three bird species. The protozoan Isospora ashmoonensis was first identified in a blackcap in Egypt. Blackcaps may carry parasitic worms that sometimes kill their hosts. External parasites include chewing lice and feather mites. The latter do little damage, although heavy infestations cause individual tail feathers to develop asymmetrically.

== In culture ==
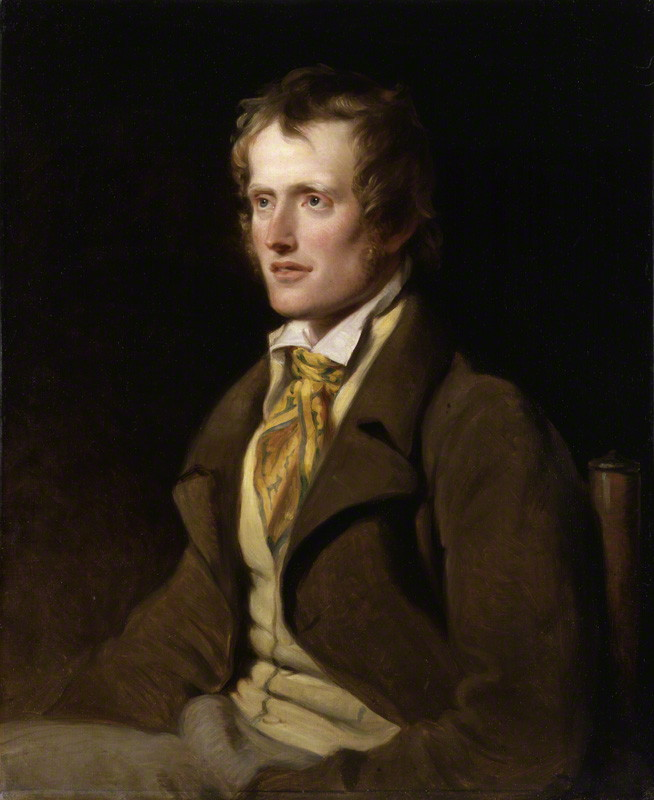
The English poet John Clare described the blackcap as the "March Nightingale".

Aristotle, in his History of Animals, considered that the garden warbler eventually metamorphosed into a blackcap. The blackcap's song has led to it being described as the "mock nightingale" or "country nightingale", and John Clare, in "The March Nightingale" describes the listener as believing that the rarer species has arrived prematurely. "He stops his own and thinks the nightingale/Hath of her monthly reckoning counted wrong". The song is also the topic of Italian poet Giovanni Pascoli's "La Capinera" [The Blackcap].

Giovanni Verga's 1871 novel Storia di una capinera, according to its author, was inspired by a story of a blackcap trapped and caged by children. The bird, silent and pining for its lost freedom, eventually dies. In the book, a nun evacuated from her convent by cholera falls in love with a family friend, only to have to return to her confinement when the disease wanes. The novel was adapted as films of the same name in 1917, 1943 and 1993. The last version was directed by Franco Zeffirelli, and its English-language version was retitled as Sparrow. In Saint François d'Assise, an opera by Messiaen, the orchestration is based on bird song. St Francis himself is represented by the blackcap.

In Finland, a caged blackcap is featured in a Christmas song Sylvian Joululaulu (compare with the Latin name Sylvia atricapilla), and is said to represent Finland before it claimed independence from Russia in 1917.

Folk names for the blackcap often refer to its most obvious plumage feature (black-headed peggy, King Harry black cap and coal hoodie) or to its song, as in the "nightingale" names above. Other old names are based on its choice of nesting material (Jack Straw, hay bird, hay chat and hay Jack). There is a tradition of the Royal Navy's Fleet Air Arm bases being named for birds. A former base near Stretton in Cheshire was called HMS Blackcap.

== Status ==
The blackcap has a very large range, and its population in Europe is estimated at 41–65 million breeding pairs. Allowing for birds breeding in Africa and Asia, the total population estimate is between 101 and 161 million individuals. It is therefore classified by the International Union for Conservation of Nature as being of least concern.

Blackcaps and other small birds are illegally trapped and hunted in large numbers in Mediterranean countries, particularly in Lebanon, Syria, Palestine, Malta, Libya, Egypt and Cyprus, where they are considered as a delicacy. Despite hunting and natural hazards, the European population of the blackcap has been rising for several decades as the range extends northwards, for example to Scotland and Denmark. There are occasional nesting records from outside the main range, such as in northern Israel and the Faroes, and wandering birds may appear further afield in Iceland or on the islands of Arctic Russia. In the Baltic, the spread of the blackcap appears to have been helped by the availability of territories formerly occupied by the declining barred warbler.

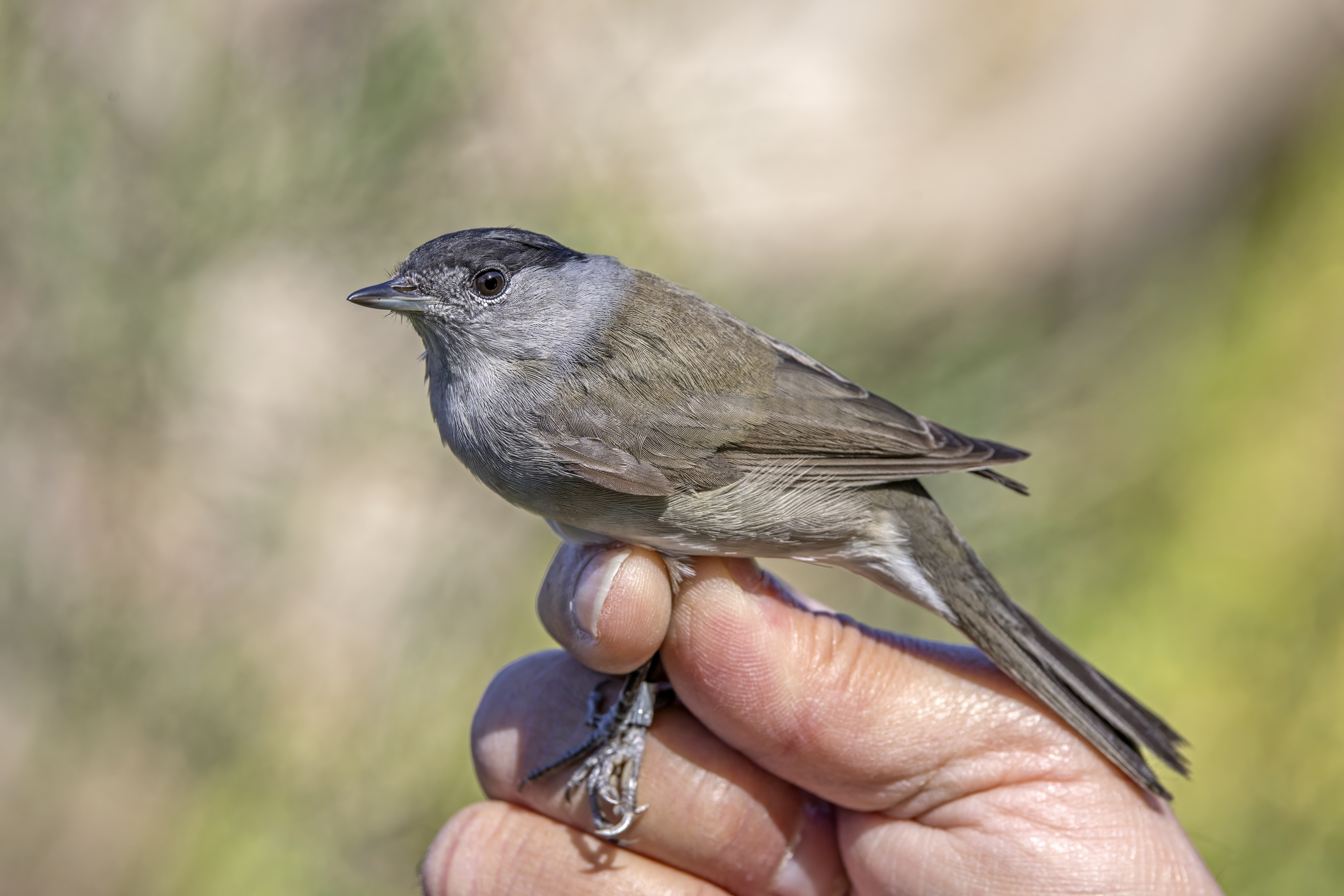
ringed male, Malta

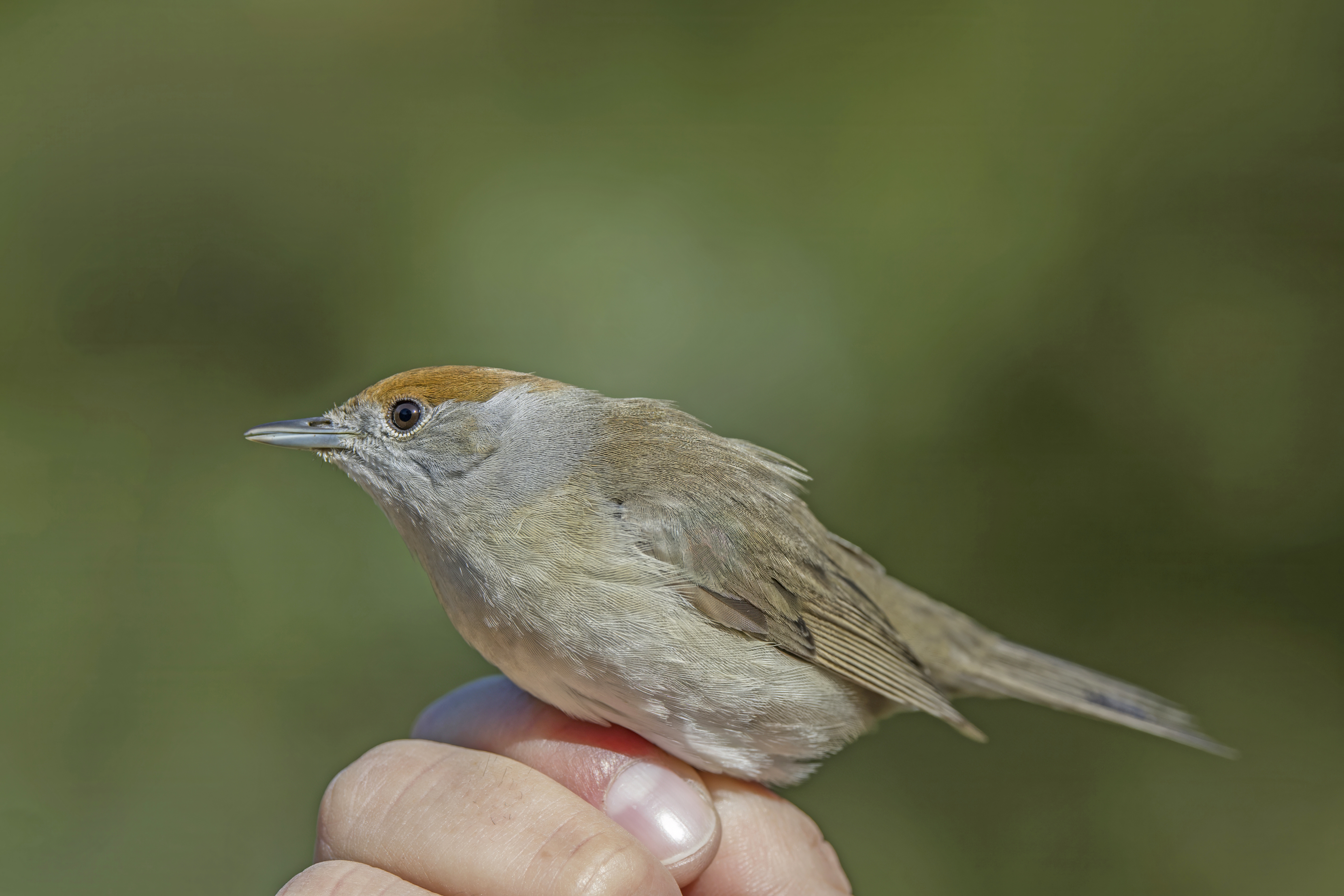
ringed female, Malta

== Cited texts ==
- Arnason, Johann; Murphy, Peter (2001). Agon, Logos, Polis: The Greek Achievement and Its Aftermath. Wiesbaden: Franz Steiner. ISBN 3-515-07747-2.
- Ash, John; Atkins, John D (2009). Birds of Ethiopia and Eritrea: An Atlas of Distribution. London: Christopher Helm. ISBN 978-1-4081-0979-3.
- Baker, Kevin (1997). Warblers of Europe, Asia and North Africa. Helm Identification Guides. London: Helm. ISBN 0-7136-3971-7.
- Barlow, Clive; Wacher, Tim; Disley, Tony (1997). A Field Guide to birds of The Gambia and Senegal. Robertsbridge: Pica Press. ISBN 1-873403-32-1.
- Cardillo, Massimo (1987). Tra le quinte del cinematografo: Cinema, cultura e societa in Italia 1900–1937 (in Italian). Bari: Dedalo. ISBN 88-220-4522-X.
- Chiti, Roberto; Lancia, Enrico; Poppi, Roberto (2002). Dizionario del cinema italiano (in Italian). Rome: Gremese Editore. ISBN 88-8440-085-6.
- Cocker, Mark; Mabey, Richard (2005). Birds Britannica. London: Chatto & Windus. ISBN 0-7011-6907-9.
- Ferguson, Aldon (2008). Cheshire Airfields in the Second World War. Newbury: Countryside Books. ISBN 978-1-85306-927-7.
- Hill, Peter (1995). The Messiaen Companion. Cleckheaton: Amadeus Press. ISBN 0-931340-95-0.
- Jobling, James A (2010). The Helm Dictionary of Scientific Bird Names. London: Christopher Helm. ISBN 978-1-4081-2501-4.
- Linnaeus, Carl (1758). Systema naturae per regna tria naturae, secundum classes, ordines, genera, species, cum characteribus, differentiis, synonymis, locis. Tomus I. Editio decima, reformata (in Latin). Holmiae (Laurentii Salvii).
- Mason, C F (1995). The Blackcap (Hamlyn Species Guides). London: Hamlyn. ISBN 0-600-58006-7.
- Newton, Ian (2010). Bird Migration (Collins New Naturalist Library 113). London: Collins. ISBN 978-0-00-730732-6.
- Shirihai, Hadoram; Gargallo, Gabriel; Helbig, Andreas; Harris, Alan; Cottridge, David (2001). Sylvia Warblers: Identification, Taxonomy and Phylogeny of the Genus Sylvia. London: A & C Black. ISBN 0-7136-3984-9.
- Simms, Eric (1985). British Warblers (New Naturalist Series). London: Collins. ISBN 0-00-219810-X.
- Snow, David; Perrins, Christopher M, eds. (1998). The Birds of the Western Palearctic concise edition (2 volumes). Oxford: Oxford University Press. ISBN 0-19-854099-X.
- Zimmerman, Dale A; Turner, Donald A; Pearson, David J (1996). Birds of Kenya and Northern Tanzania. Princeton: Princeton University Press. ISBN 0-691-02658-0.
