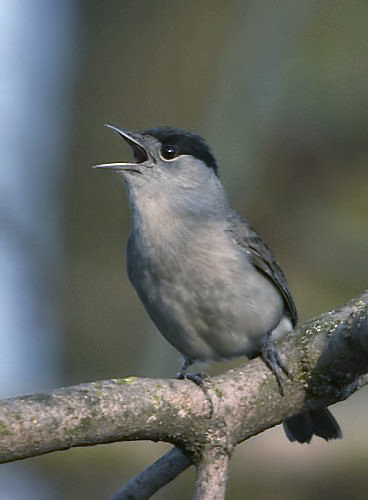
- Eurasian blackcap (Sylvia atricapilla)

Scientific classification
- Kingdom: Animalia
- Phylum: Chordata
- Class: Aves
- Order: Passeriformes
- Superfamily: Sylvioidea
- Family: Sylviidae; Leach, 1820

Genera
- See text

= Sylviidae =

Family of birds

Sylviidae is a family of passerine birds that includes the genus Sylvia, and the closely related genus Curruca, formerly included in Sylvia. They are found in Eurasia and Africa, with the greatest diversity in the Mediterranean region.

== Taxonomy and systematics ==
The scientific name Sylviidae was introduced by the English zoologist William Elford Leach (as Sylviadæ) in a guide to the contents of the British Museum published in 1820. The family became part of an assemblage known as the Old World warblers and was a wastebin taxon with over 400 species of bird in over 70 genera. Advances in classification, particularly helped with molecular data, have led to the splitting out of several new families from within this group. There is now evidence that the Sylviidae warblers are more closely related to the Old World babblers than other birds also called warblers

A molecular phylogenetic study using mitochondrial DNA sequence data published in 2011 found that the species in the genus Sylvia formed two distinct clades. Based on these results, the ornithologists Edward Dickinson and Leslie Christidis in the fourth edition of Howard and Moore Complete Checklist of the Birds of the World, chose to split the genus and moved most of the species into a resurrected genus Curruca, retaining only the Eurasian blackcap and the garden warbler in Sylvia. They also moved the African hill babbler and Dohrn's thrush-babbler into Sylvia. The split was at first not accepted by the British Ornithologists' Union on the grounds that "a split into two genera would unnecessarily destabilize nomenclature and results in only a minor increase in phylogenetic information content", but then later accepted in 2021.

- - - Pycnonotidae – bulbuls (161 species)
    - - - Paradoxornithidae – parrotbills and myzornis (38 species)
        - Sylviidae – sylviid warblers (32 species)
      - - Zosteropidae – white-eyes (147 species)
        - - Timaliidae – tree babblers (58 species)
          - - Pellorneidae – ground babblers (65 species)
            - Leiothrichidae – laughingthrushes and allies (143 species)

Phylogeny based on a study of the babblers by Cai and colleagues published in 2019.

=== List of species ===
The family Sylviidae has undergone several revisions since the above phylogeny was published. As of August 2024, the International Ornithological Committee (IOC) recognizes these 32 species divided among two genera: This list is presented according to the IOC taxonomic sequence and can also be sorted alphabetically by common name and binomial.

Genus	Common name	Binomial name	IOC sequence
Sylvia Scopoli, 1769	Eurasian blackcap	Sylvia atricapilla	1
Sylvia Scopoli, 1769	Garden warbler	Sylvia borin	2
Sylvia Scopoli, 1769	Dohrn's warbler	Sylvia dohrni	3
Sylvia Scopoli, 1769	Abyssinian catbird	Sylvia galinieri	4
Sylvia Scopoli, 1769	Bush blackcap	Sylvia nigricapillus	5
Sylvia Scopoli, 1769	African hill babbler	Sylvia abyssinica	6
Sylvia Scopoli, 1769	Rwenzori hill babbler	Sylvia atriceps	7
Curruca Bechstein, 1802	Barred warbler	Curruca nisoria	8
Curruca Bechstein, 1802	Layard's warbler	Curruca layardi	9
Curruca Bechstein, 1802	Banded parisoma	Curruca boehmi	10
Curruca Bechstein, 1802	Chestnut-vented warbler	Curruca subcoerulea	11
Curruca Bechstein, 1802	Lesser whitethroat	Curruca curruca	23
Curruca Bechstein, 1802	Brown parisoma	Curruca lugens	13
Curruca Bechstein, 1802	Yemen warbler	Curruca buryi	14
Curruca Bechstein, 1802	Arabian warbler	Curruca leucomelaena	15
Curruca Bechstein, 1802	Western Orphean warbler	Curruca hortensis	16
Curruca Bechstein, 1802	Eastern Orphean warbler	Curruca crassirostris	17
Curruca Bechstein, 1802	African desert warbler	Curruca deserti	18
Curruca Bechstein, 1802	Asian desert warbler	Curruca nana	19
Curruca Bechstein, 1802	Tristram's warbler	Curruca deserticola	20
Curruca Bechstein, 1802	Menetries's warbler	Curruca mystacea	21
Curruca Bechstein, 1802	Rüppell's warbler	Curruca ruppeli	22
Curruca Bechstein, 1802	Cyprus warbler	Curruca melanothorax	23
Curruca Bechstein, 1802	Sardinian warbler	Curruca melanocephala	24
Curruca Bechstein, 1802	Western subalpine warbler	Curruca iberiae	25
Curruca Bechstein, 1802	Moltoni's warbler	Curruca subalpina	26
Curruca Bechstein, 1802	Eastern subalpine warbler	Curruca cantillans	27
Curruca Bechstein, 1802	Common whitethroat	Curruca communis	28
Curruca Bechstein, 1802	Spectacled warbler	Curruca conspicillata	29
Curruca Bechstein, 1802	Marmora's warbler	Curruca sarda	30
Curruca Bechstein, 1802	Dartford warbler	Curruca undata	31
Curruca Bechstein, 1802	Balearic warbler	Curruca balearica	32

== Description ==
Sylviids are small to medium-sized passerine birds. The bill is generally thin and pointed with bristles at the base. Sylviids have a slender shape and an inconspicuous and mostly plain plumage. The wings have ten primaries, which are rounded and short in non-migratory species.

== Distribution and habitat ==
Most species occur in Asia, and to a lesser extent in Africa. A few range into Europe.
