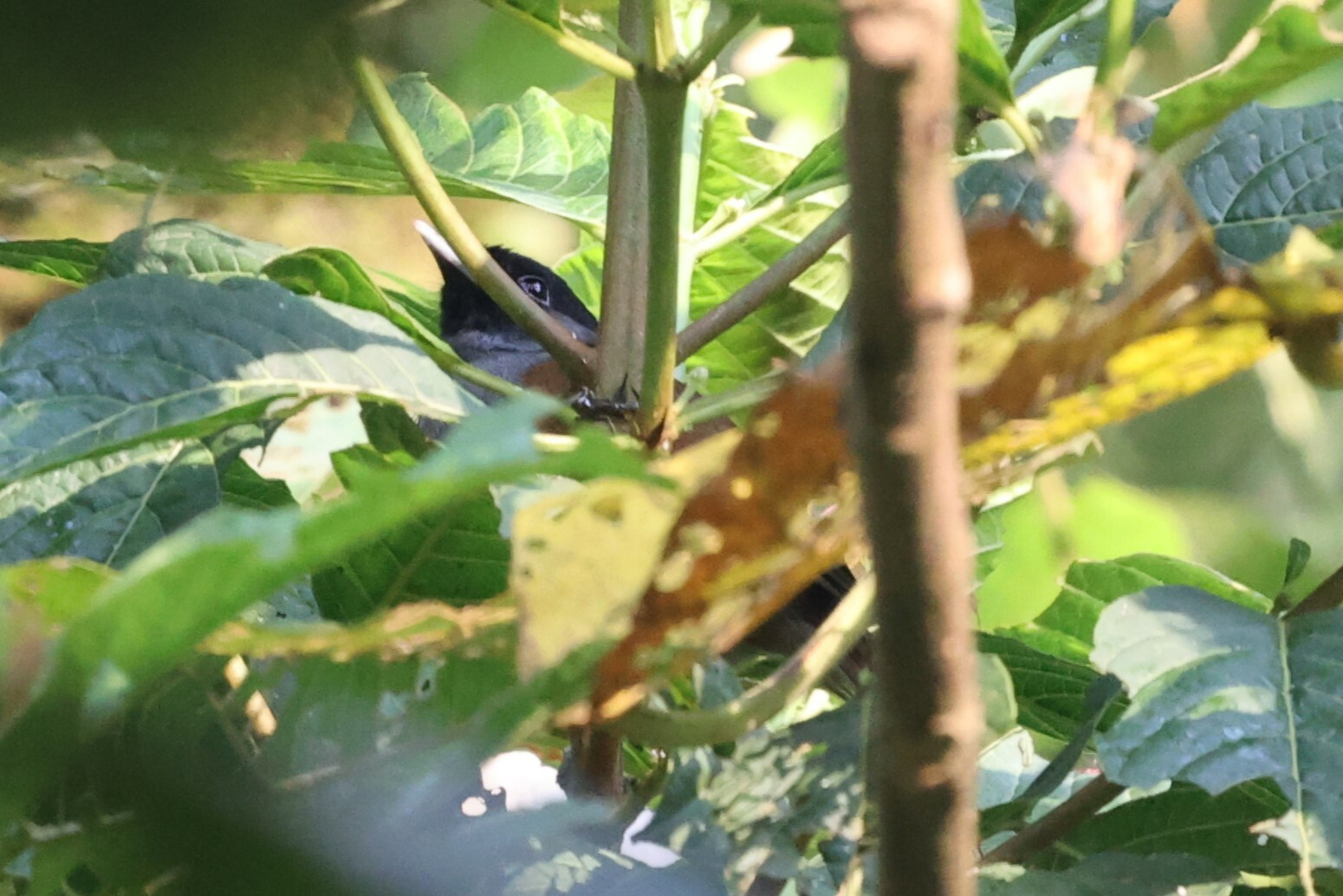

Conservation status
- Least Concern (IUCN 3.1)

Scientific classification
- Kingdom: Animalia
- Phylum: Chordata
- Class: Aves
- Order: Passeriformes
- Family: Sylviidae
- Genus: Sylvia
- Species: S. atriceps

Binomial name
- Sylvia atriceps (Sharpe, 1902)

Synonyms
- Turdinus atriceps; Pseudoalcippe atriceps

= Rwenzori hill babbler =

Species of bird

The Rwenzori hill babbler (Sylvia atriceps) is a species of passerine bird in the family Sylviidae that is found in Africa.

The Rwenzori hill babbler was described by the English zoologist Richard Bowdler Sharpe in 1902 and given the binomial name Turdinus atriceps. The type locality is the Rwenzori Mountains on the border between Uganda and the Democratic Republic of the Congo. The specific epithet atriceps is from the Latin ater for "black" and -ceps for "capped" or "headed". The Rwenzori hill babbler was formerly considered to be a conspecific with the African hill babbler. The species is monotypic.
