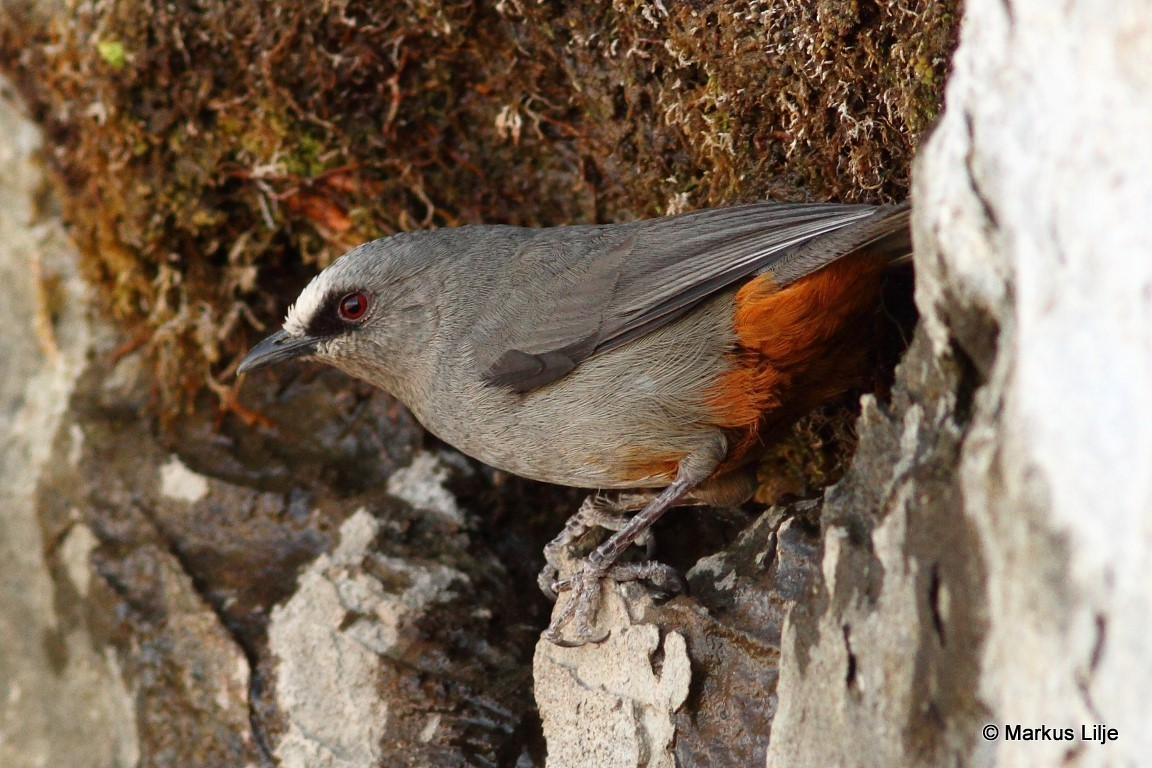

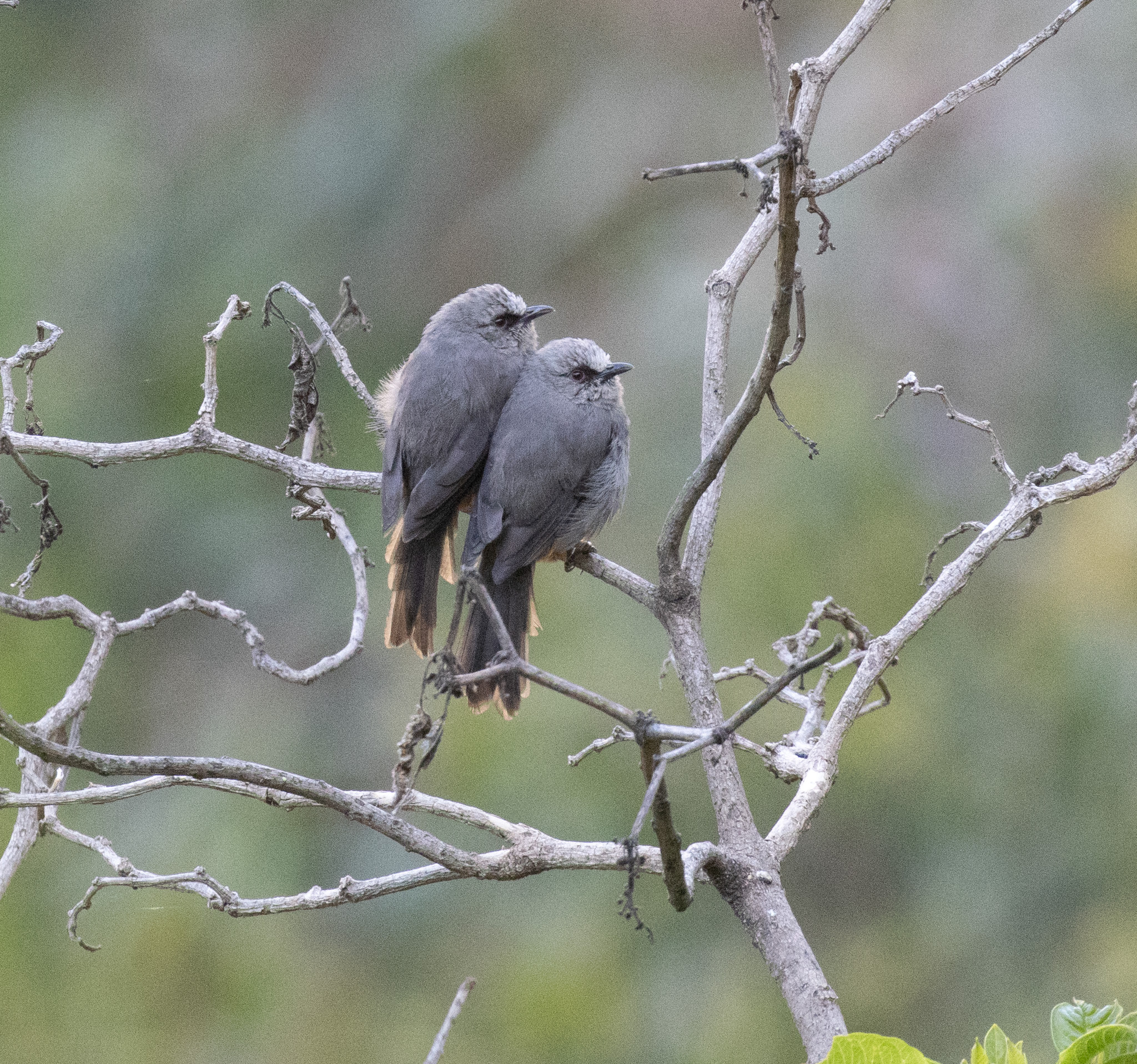

Conservation status
- Least Concern (IUCN 3.1)

Scientific classification
- Kingdom: Animalia
- Phylum: Chordata
- Class: Aves
- Order: Passeriformes
- Family: Sylviidae
- Genus: Sylvia
- Species: S. galinieri

Binomial name
- Sylvia galinieri (Guérin-Méneville, 1843)

Synonyms
- Parophasma galinieri

= Abyssinian catbird =

Species of bird

The Abyssinian catbird (Sylvia galinieri), also known as the juniper babbler, is a small passerine in the family Sylviidae, endemic to the highland forests and scrub of Ethiopia. Despite its name, it is unrelated to other birds called "catbirds." It is mostly grey, with black lores, a whitish forehead, and a chestnut vent.

== Description ==
The Abyssinian catbird is a small-sized babbler. Its body is round with relatively short wings and legs. The bird's belly is white, but its upper parts are a lighter shade of grey that gradually fades to a darker shade moving to the backside of the bird. The head of the bird is a light shade of grey with dark highlights surrounding the eyes. The eyes themselves have a scarlet iris surrounding dark brown pupils. The beak is short pointed and black. Its wings are the darkest parts of its body having parallel bars of black along its length with the rest of the wing being grey. Its underside from its legs to its tail is a distinct orange that gives way to a tail that is about half the length of the bird itself. Abyssinian catbirds measure around 19 cm (7.5 in) in length. The bird was formerly the sole member of the genus Parophasma, and its taxonomy is still inconclusive. It is not yet certain if they are more closely related to babblers or warblers.

== Distribution and habitat ==
The Abyssinian catbird is a resident of the Afrotropical realm and is endemic to Ethiopia, meaning that it is exclusively found in that region. They are more commonly found at higher elevations around 11,500 feet (3,500 meters), such as in the mountainous northern Semian region, or in the hilly western region of the nation. They have an area of occurrence of 44,500 km^{2}. They prefer forested habitats and dry thickets, and so are most commonly found in highland bamboo, juniper, and olive trees. They are not known to migrate outside of their habitat.

== Behavior ==
=== Diet ===
The Abyssinian catbird feeds on a varied diet of fruits and insects. It is particularly associated with juniper berries, but also takes other small fruits and a range of insects common in its shrubby highland habitat.

=== Breeding habits ===
Abyssinian catbirds are known to breed in the season from February to August (or January to July). Their nests, often consisting of a tangle of vines and plant stems, hold two pale-colored, dark-speckled eggs.

=== Threats ===
The Abyssinian catbird is evaluated to be least concern on the IUCN Red List and does not have any reported threats. The bird is relatively abundant in its general area, despite its apparent decreasing population trend.
