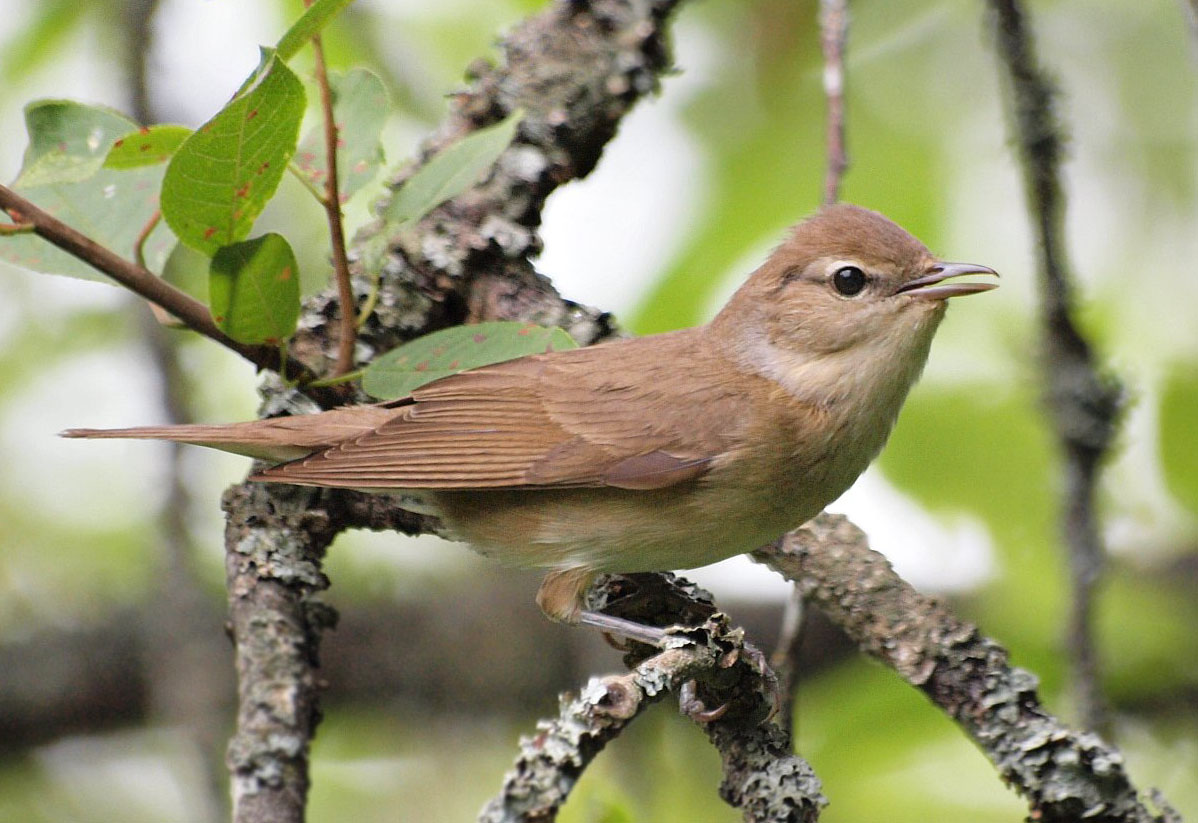
- Garden warbler (Sylvia borin)

Scientific classification
- Kingdom: Animalia
- Phylum: Chordata
- Class: Aves
- Order: Passeriformes
- Family: Sylviidae
- Genus: Sylvia; Scopoli, 1769

Type species
- Motacilla atricapilla (Eurasian blackcap) Linnaeus, 1758

Species
- See text

Synonyms
- Parisoma Swainson in Richardson, 1832

= Sylvia (bird) =

Genus of birds

Sylvia is a genus of small birds in the "Old World warbler" family Sylviidae.

There are seven species in the genus. Typical warblers occur in the temperate to tropical regions of Europe, western and central Asia, and Africa.

They are strongly built, with stouter legs and a slightly thicker bill than many other warblers. The plumage is in varying shades of grey and brown, usually darker above and paler below, with bluish or pinkish tones in several species; several also have orange-brown or rufous fringed wing feathers. The tail is square-ended in most, slightly rounded in a few, and in several species has white sides. Many of the species show some sexual dimorphism, with distinctive male and female plumages, with the males in many having black or bright grey on the heads, replaced by brown, brownish-grey or similar dusky colours in females; about a third of the species also have a conspicuous red eye ring in males. Species breeding in cool temperate regions are strongly migratory, while most of those in warmer regions are partially migratory or resident. They are active warblers usually associated with open woodland, scrub, hedges or shrubs. Their diet is largely insectivorous, though several species also eat fruit extensively, mainly small berries such as elder and ivy, particularly from late summer to late winter; one species (blackcap) also frequently takes a wide variety of human-provided foods on birdtables in winter.

== Taxonomy and systematics ==
The genus Sylvia was introduced in 1769 by the Italian naturalist Giovanni Antonio Scopoli. Scopoli did not specify a type species but this was designated as the Eurasian blackcap (Sylvia atricapilla) by Charles Lucien Bonaparte in 1828. The genus name is from Modern Latin silvia, a woodland sprite, related to silva meaning "a wood".

The typical warblers are now known to form a major lineage in a clade containing also the parrotbills and some taxa formerly considered to be Old World babblers. The other "Old World warblers" have been moved to their own families, entirely redelimiting the Sylviidae.

A molecular phylogenetic study using mitochondrial DNA sequence data published in 2011 found that the species in the genus Sylvia formed two distinct clades. Based on these results, the ornithologists Edward Dickinson and Leslie Christidis in the fourth edition of Howard and Moore Complete Checklist of the Birds of the World, chose to split the genus and moved most of the species into a resurrected genus Curruca retaining only the Eurasian blackcap and the garden warbler in Sylvia. In an additional change they moved the African hill babbler from Horizorhinus and Dohrn's warbler from Pseudoalcippe into Sylvia. The split was at first not made by the British Ornithologists' Union on the grounds that "a split into two genera would unnecessarily destabilize nomenclature and results in only a minor increase in phylogenetic information content", but then later accepted in 2021.

=== Pseudoalcippe ===
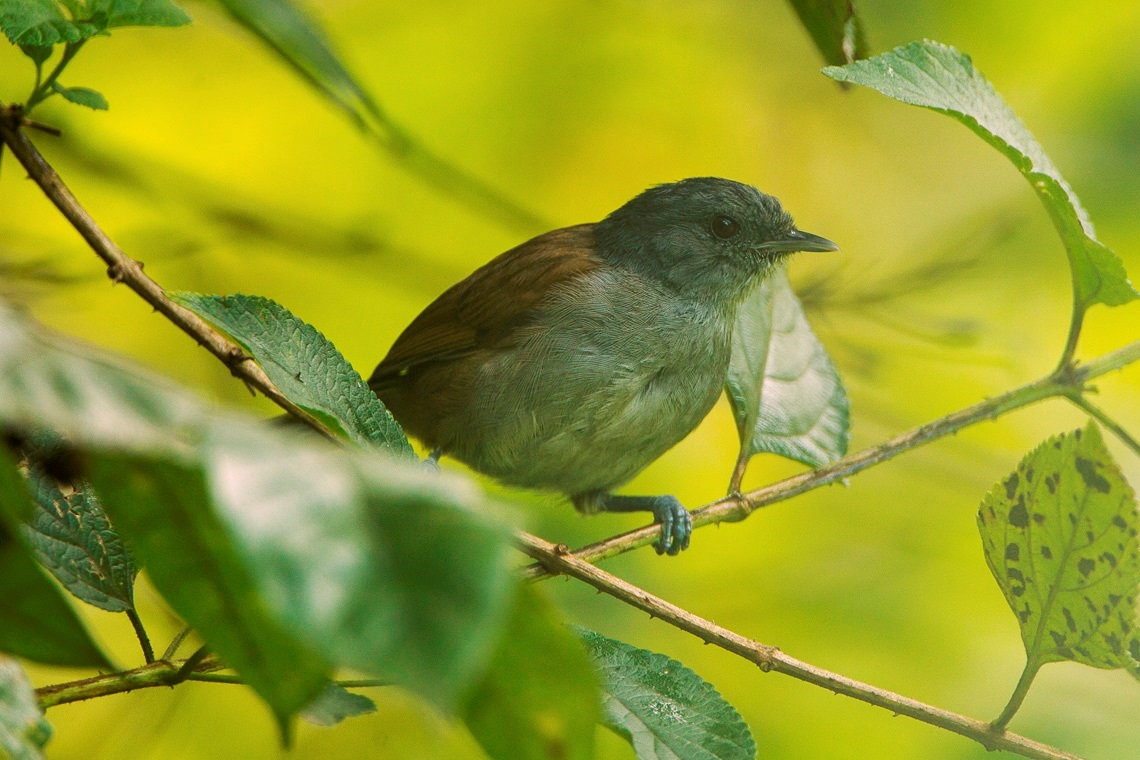
African hill babbler, S. abyssinica, previously Pseudoalcippe abyssinica

Pseudoalcippe was erected by the English ornithologist David Armitage Bannerman in 1923. The type species is the Ruwenzori hill babbler. The genus contained two species:

- African hill babbler (formerly Pseudoalcippe abyssinica)
- Rwenzori hill babbler (formerly Pseudoalcippe atriceps)

These two species were previously considered as members of the family Timaliidae (Old World babblers) but molecular phylogenetic studies have shown that they are closely related to species belonging to the genus Sylvia in the family Sylviidae. Both species are now placed in Sylvia.

=== Extant species ===
The genus contains the following seven species:

Image	Common name	Scientific name	Distribution
	Garden warbler	Sylvia borin	breeds in western Palearctic, winters in Africa
	Eurasian blackcap	Sylvia atricapilla	breeds in western Palearctic, winters in Africa
	Dohrn's warbler	Sylvia dohrni	Príncipe Island (Gulf of Guinea)
	Abyssinian catbird	Sylvia galinieri	highland juniper and Hagenia forest of Ethiopia
	Bush blackcap	Sylvia nigricapillus	eastern South Africa (southward to central Eastern Cape) and western Eswatini
	Rwenzori hill babbler	Sylvia atriceps	Nigeria to Cameroon, eastern Democratic Republic of the Congo, Rwanda, and western Uganda
	African hill babbler	Sylvia abyssinica	scattered distribution in Africa
