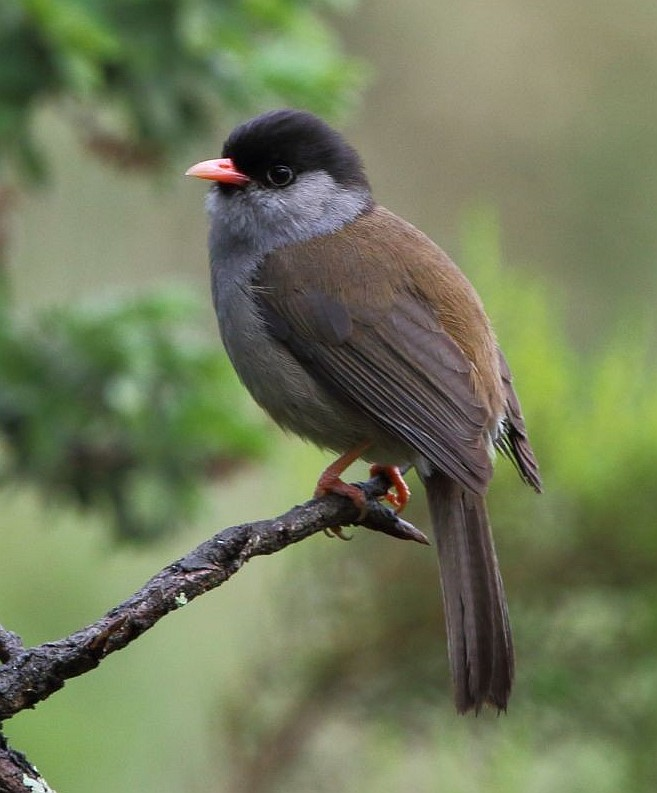
- At Giant's Castle Game Reserve, KwaZulu-Natal, South Africa

Conservation status
- Vulnerable (IUCN 3.1)

Scientific classification
- Kingdom: Animalia
- Phylum: Chordata
- Class: Aves
- Order: Passeriformes
- Family: Sylviidae
- Genus: Sylvia
- Species: S. nigricapillus

Binomial name
- Sylvia nigricapillus (Vieillot, 1818)

Synonyms
- Turdus nigri capillus (protonym); Lioptilus nigricapillus; Alcippe nigricapillus

= Bush blackcap =

Species of bird

The bush blackcap (Sylvia nigricapillus) is a species of bird in the family Sylviidae. It is endemic to South Africa and Eswatini. Its natural habitats are subtropical or tropical moist montane forests and subtropical or tropical high-altitude shrubland. It is threatened by habitat loss.

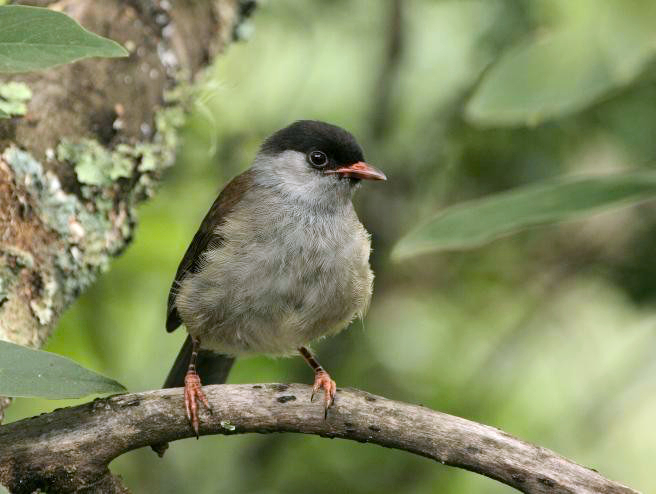
Immature bush blackcap
