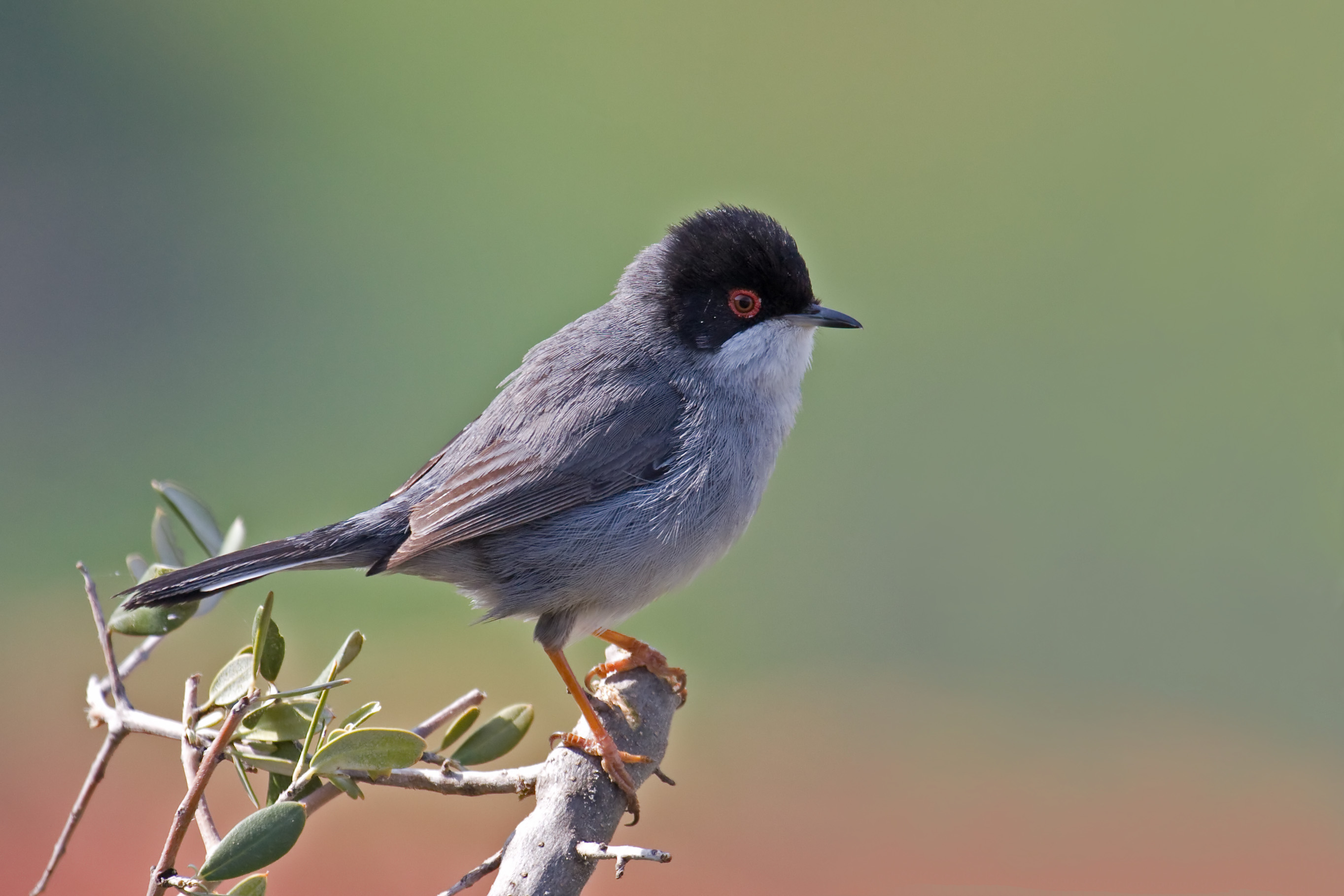
- Adult male, Methana peninsula, Greece
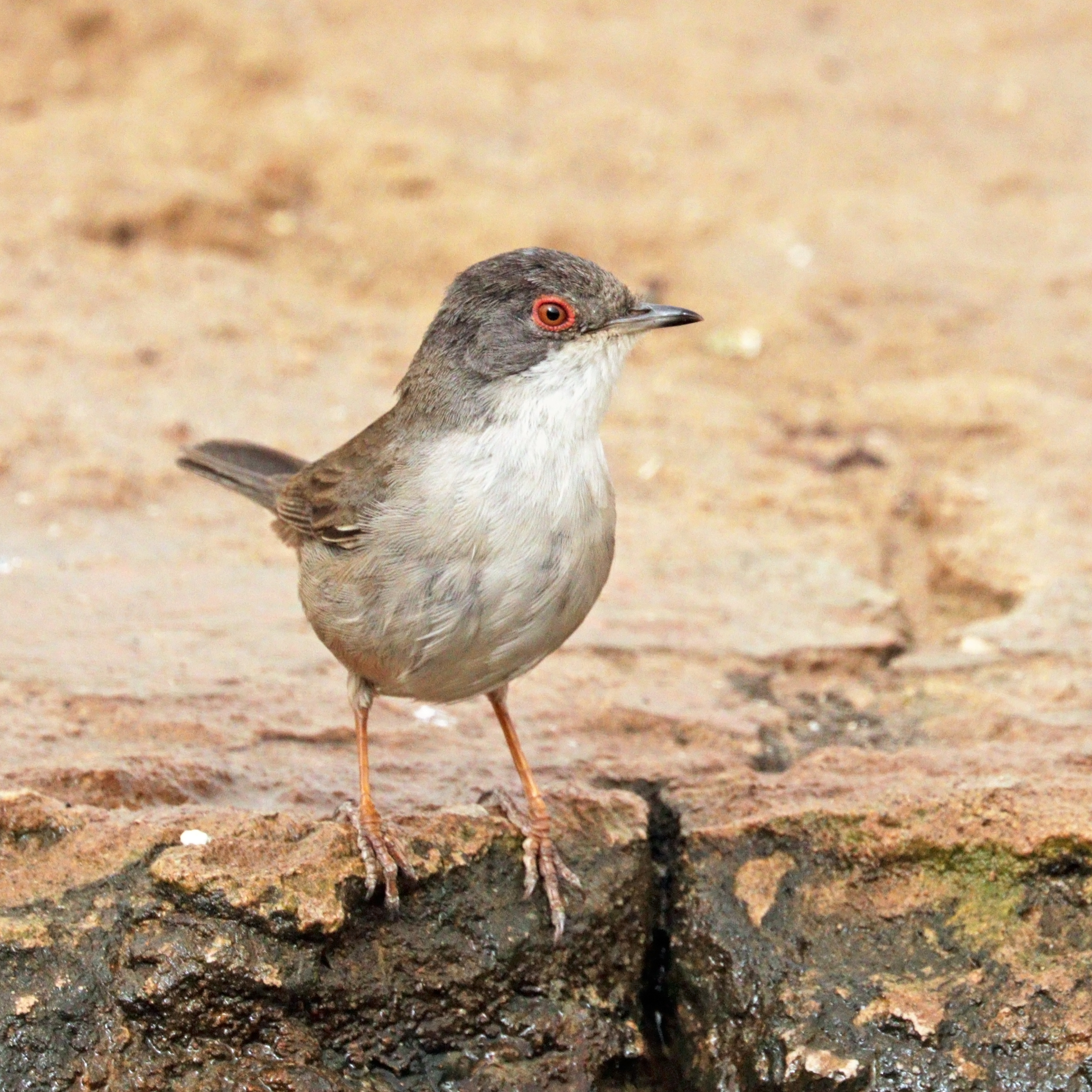
- Female, Souss-Massa National Park, Morocco

Conservation status
- Least Concern (IUCN 3.1)

Scientific classification
- Kingdom: Animalia
- Phylum: Chordata
- Class: Aves
- Order: Passeriformes
- Family: Sylviidae
- Genus: Curruca
- Species: C. melanocephala

Binomial name
- Curruca melanocephala (Gmelin, JF, 1789)

Subspecies
- 2-6, see text
- Range of C. melanocephala Resident Breeding Non-breeding

Synonyms
- Sylvia melanocephala

= Sardinian warbler =

Species of bird

The Sardinian warbler (Curruca melanocephala) is a common and widespread Sylviidae warbler from the Mediterranean region. Like most Curruca species, it has distinct male and female plumages. The adult male has a grey back, whitish underparts, black head, white throat and red eyes. Plumages are somewhat variable even in the same locality, with the intensity of a reddish hue on upper- and/or underside that varies from absent to (in some subspecies) pronounced. The female is mainly brown above and buff below, with a grey head. The Sardinian warbler's song is fast and rattling, and is very characteristic of the Mediterranean areas where this bird breeds.

== Taxonomy and systematics ==
The Sardinian warbler was formally described in 1789 by the German naturalist Johann Friedrich Gmelin in his revised and expanded edition of Carl Linnaeus's Systema Naturae. He placed it with the wagtails in the genus Motacilla and coined the binomial name Motacilla melanocephala. Gmelin based his entry on a description by the Italian zoologist Francesco Cetti in his book Gli uccelli di Sardegna (The Birds of Sardinia) that was published in 1776. This was the second volume of his Storia naturale di Sardegna. Cetti did not use scientific names for the species. When a translation of Cetti's three volumes were published in German, the translator, David Piesch, and the editor, Nathanael Gottfried Leske, included an Appendix at the end of the third volume (published in 1784) in which they proposed the binomial name Motacilla melanocephala, the identical name that was later adopted by Gmelin. In spite of this earlier publication, as of 2023 Gmelin is treated as the authority for the species.

The species was formerly placed in the genus Sylvia that was introduced in 1769 by the Italian naturalist Giovanni Antonio Scopoli. The genus name is from Modern Latin silvia, a woodland sprite, related to silva, a wood. The specific melanocephala is from Ancient Greek melas, "black", and kephale, "head". Currently, the Sardinian warbler is placed in the genus Curruca by the IOC, along with most of the species formerly classified in the genus Sylvia.

Together with Menetries's warbler the Sardinian warbler forms a superspecies. Both have white malar areas and light throats, and otherwise black heads in adult males, as well as a naked ring around the eye. The eastern subalpine warbler, which seems the superspecies' closest relative, has a dark throat and breast and a dark gray upper head in males, but otherwise shares these characters. These three species are related to a dark-throated superspecies consisting of Rüppell's warbler and the Cyprus warbler, which also share the white malar area with blackish above.

This bird may be considered a superspecies, divided into the western Curruca melanocephala and Curruca momus from the more arid regions of the Near East and adjacent Africa.

=== Subspecies ===
The geographical variation in the Sardinian warbler conforms to some extent with Gloger's rule, though not as strongly as in some other typical warblers. The validity of leucogastra and norissae is not accepted by some authors, and valverdei has been described very recently. On the other hand, leucogastra might be more than one subspecies.

- Curruca melanocephala melanocephala (Gmelin, 1789)

Iberia across the northern Mediterranean to western Turkey. Extends into the Maghreb from Iberia, and into Libya from Italy via Sicily. Migrates to the Sahel and oases in the Sahara in winter.
Large, long wings, tail tip rather pointed. A dark form, usually lacking any reddish in males but flanks extensively grey. Females' uppersides vary between deep olive brown and greyish olive.

- Curruca melanocephala leucogastra (Ledru, 1810) - often included in melanocephala; phylogenetic status requires review

Canary Islands, resident, probably some vagrancy between eastern islands and Maghreb.
Medium size, short-winged and large-billed. Tenerife and La Palma (western) birds are most distinct, being dark above with some rusty/beige hue on the underside in males. Eastern birds (Fuerteventura, Lanzarote and Gran Canaria) are more like melanocephala and momus but differ in measurements.

- Curruca melanocephala momus (Hemprich & Ehrenberg, 1833)

Near East. Resident, some local movements.
Smallish, short-winged. Varies between brownish grey and rusty above; underside almost always has reddish hue. Females rusty to rusty olive.

- Curruca melanocephala norissae Nicoll, 1917: Fayyum warbler - probably only a local morph of momus

Nile Delta region. Extinct since around 1940.
Like momus, but tend to be very reddish.

- Curruca melanocephala valverdei Cabot & Urdiales, 2005 - recently split from melanocephala

From Tiznit (Morocco) south to the Tropic of Cancer, inland to the edge of the Sahara. Resident, but some seasonal movements.
Medium-sized, tail tip quite square. A very pure-colored form, the palest subspecies. Undersides clean white. Matte black cap in males. Juveniles decidedly sandy.

== Distribution and habitat ==
It breeds in the southernmost areas of Europe and just into Asia in Turkey and the eastern end of the Mediterranean. This small passerine bird, unlike most "warblers", is not particularly migratory, but some birds winter in North Africa, and it occurs as a vagrant well away from the breeding range, as far as Great Britain.

== Behaviour and ecology ==
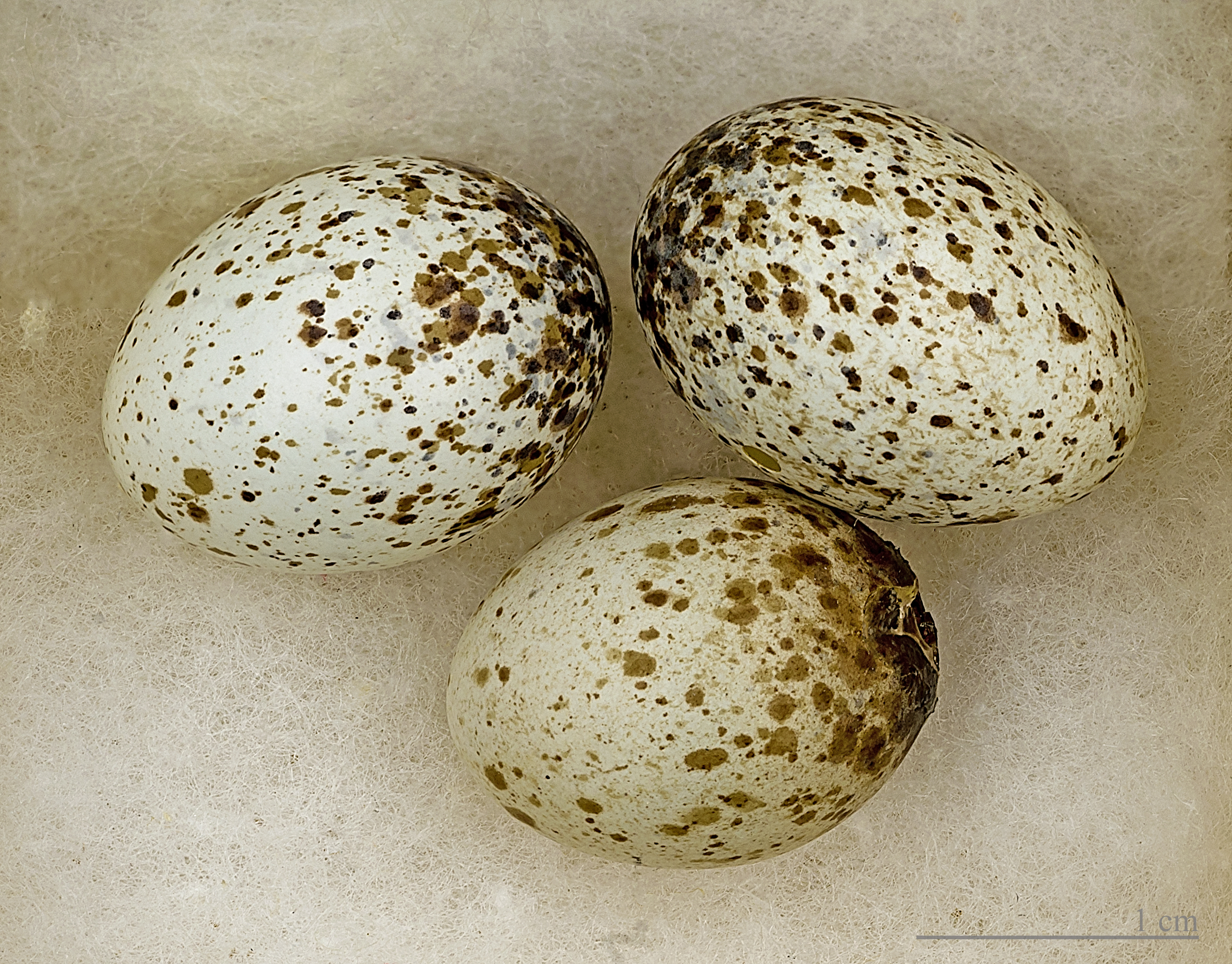
Curruca melanocephala - MHNT

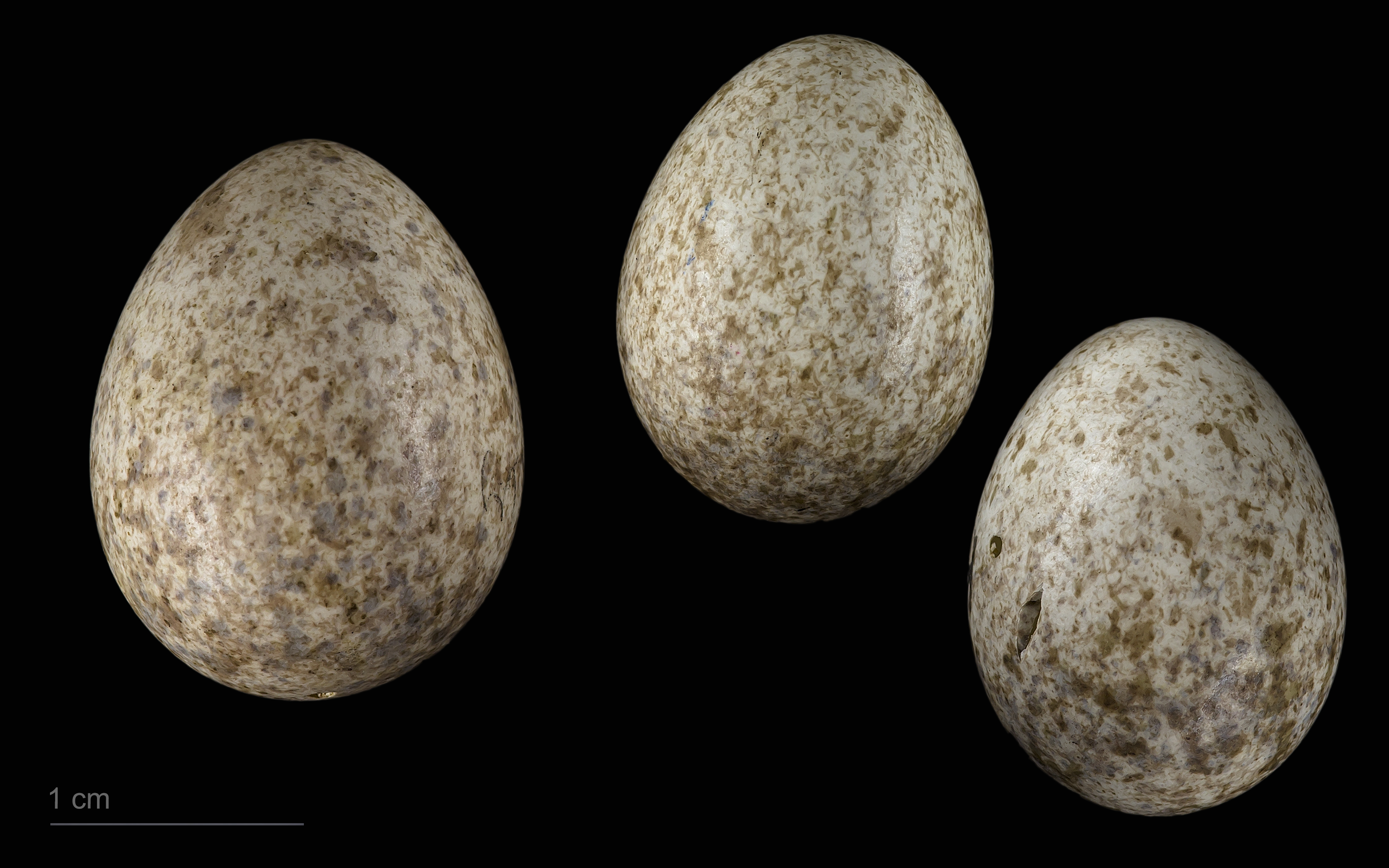
Cuculus canorus (cuckoo) egg in a Sylvia melanocephala clutch MHNT

This is a bird of open country and cultivation, with bushes for nesting. The nest is built in low shrub or brambles, and 3-6 eggs are laid. Like most "warblers", it is insectivorous, but will also take berries and other soft fruit.
