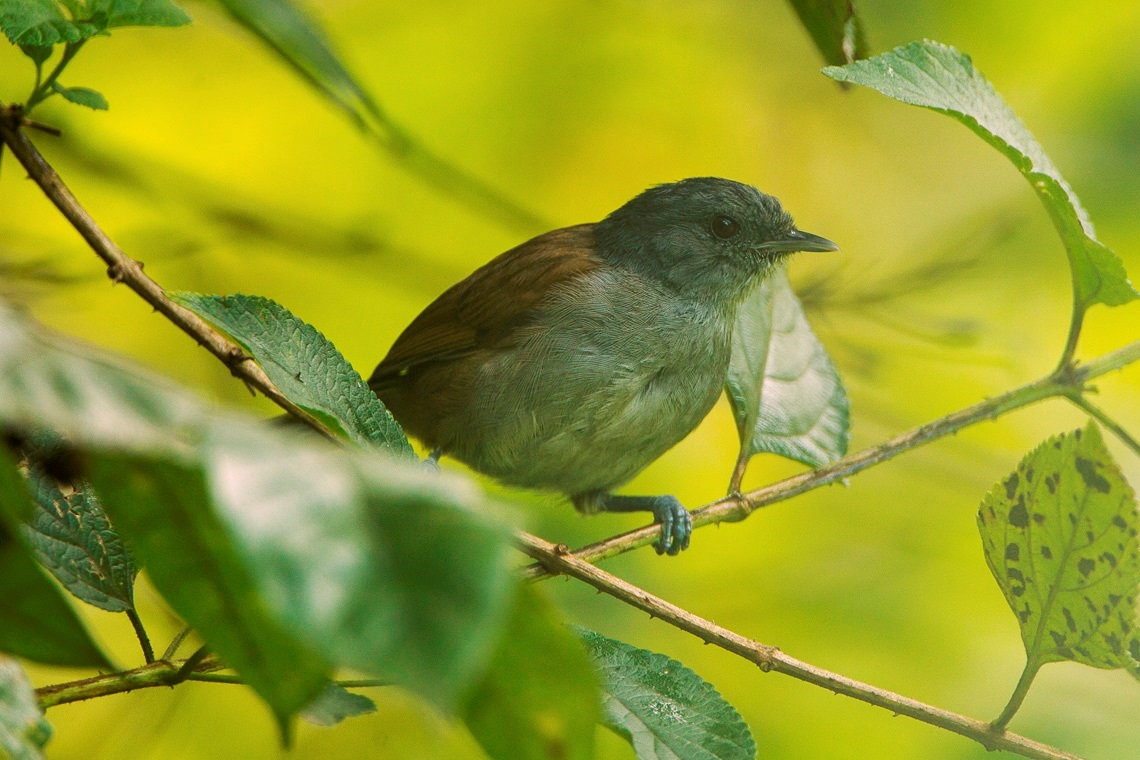
- In Kenya

Conservation status
- Least Concern (IUCN 3.1)

Scientific classification
- Kingdom: Animalia
- Phylum: Chordata
- Class: Aves
- Order: Passeriformes
- Family: Sylviidae
- Genus: Sylvia
- Species: S. abyssinica

Binomial name
- Sylvia abyssinica (Rüppell, 1840)

Synonyms
- Alcippe abyssinica; Illadopsis abyssinica; Illadopsis stierlingi; Pseudoalcippe abyssinica

= African hill babbler =

Species of bird

The African hill babbler (Sylvia abyssinica) is a species of bird in the family Sylviidae.

== Taxonomy ==
The African hill babbler was described by the German naturalist Eduard Rüppell in 1840 under the binomial name Drymophila abyssinica. The type locality is the Simen Mountains, northern Ethiopia.

There are currently six recognised subspecies:

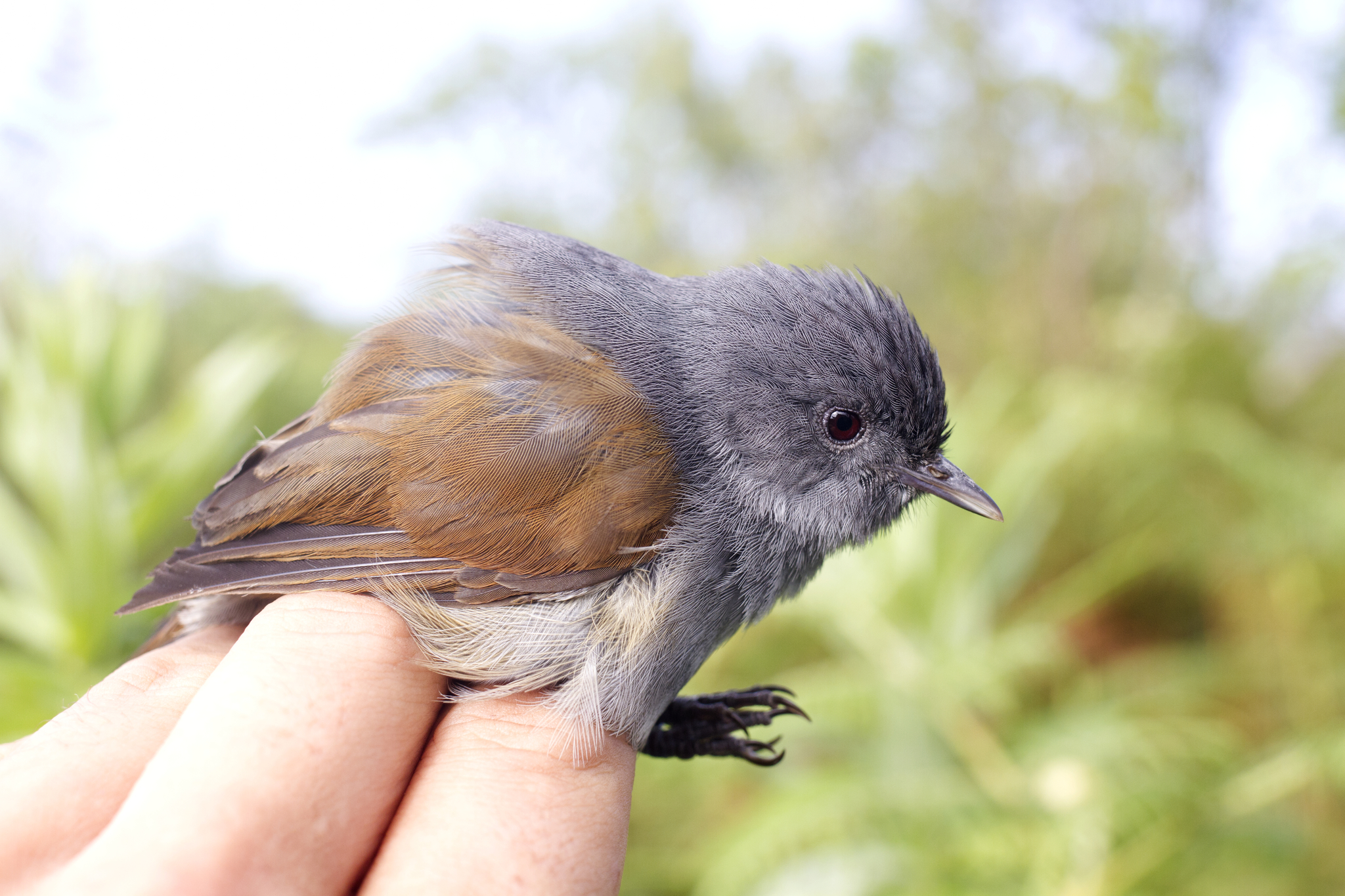
ssp. claudei

- S. a. monachus (Reichenow, 1892) – Mount Cameroon
- S. a. claudei (Alexander, 1903) – Bioko Island (formerly Fernando Póo)
- S. a. ansorgei (Rothschild, 1918) – west-central Angola, southeastern Democratic Republic of Congo and western Tanzania
- S. a. stierlingi (Reichenow, 1898) – eastern and southwestern Tanzania, the Nyika Plateau in northeastern Zambia and northern Malawi and northwestern Mozambique
- S. a. stictigula (Shelley, 1903) – northeastern Zambia, northern Malawi and northwest Mozambique
- S. a. abyssinica (Rüppell, 1840) – central Ethiopia, eastern South Sudan, eastern Uganda, western and southern Kenya and northeastern Tanzania

The distinctive black-headed Rwenzori hill babbler (Sylvia atriceps) has been considered as a subspecies. Fry et al. (2000) state it has the same vocalizations and behaviour as other races, and do not give it the status of a separate species; however, Collar & Robson (2007) split them.

This species is now considered a member of the genus Sylvia.

== Description ==
The African hill babbler is an arboreal robin-like forest bird with a thin bill, bright reddish brown back and a contrasting grey head and nape. The grey underparts are faintly marked with white streaks and the belly is paler than the breast. There is a yellowish tinge to the feathers on the flanks and the thighs. The brown eyes turn red, probably when the birds are breeding. The bill has a black upper mandible, a paler lower mandible and the legs are greyish blue. The African hill babbler weighs 14-25g and their length is 13–15 cm.

=== Voice ===
The song of the African hill babbler is a rich, melodious warble and resembles the songs of thrushes and orioles and is composed of separated whistled phrases with frequent pitch changes, and may have some scratch notes and lower pitched whistles too.

== Distribution ==
The African hill babbler has a disjointed distribution in the highland regions of western and central Africa from southeastern Nigeria east to central Ethiopia and south to northwestern Mozambique.

== Habitat ==
The natural habitats of the African hill babbler are montane forest and adjacent secondary forest, in dense undergrowth at forest edge and in clearings. Also found in gallery forest.

== Behaviour ==
The African hill babbler lives in pairs which forage within 2m of the ground, gleaning insects from leaves and picking fruit. It will also feed in the canopy and will join mixed species foraging flocks. It usually keeps concealed among creepers and vines and is most often detected by voice.
