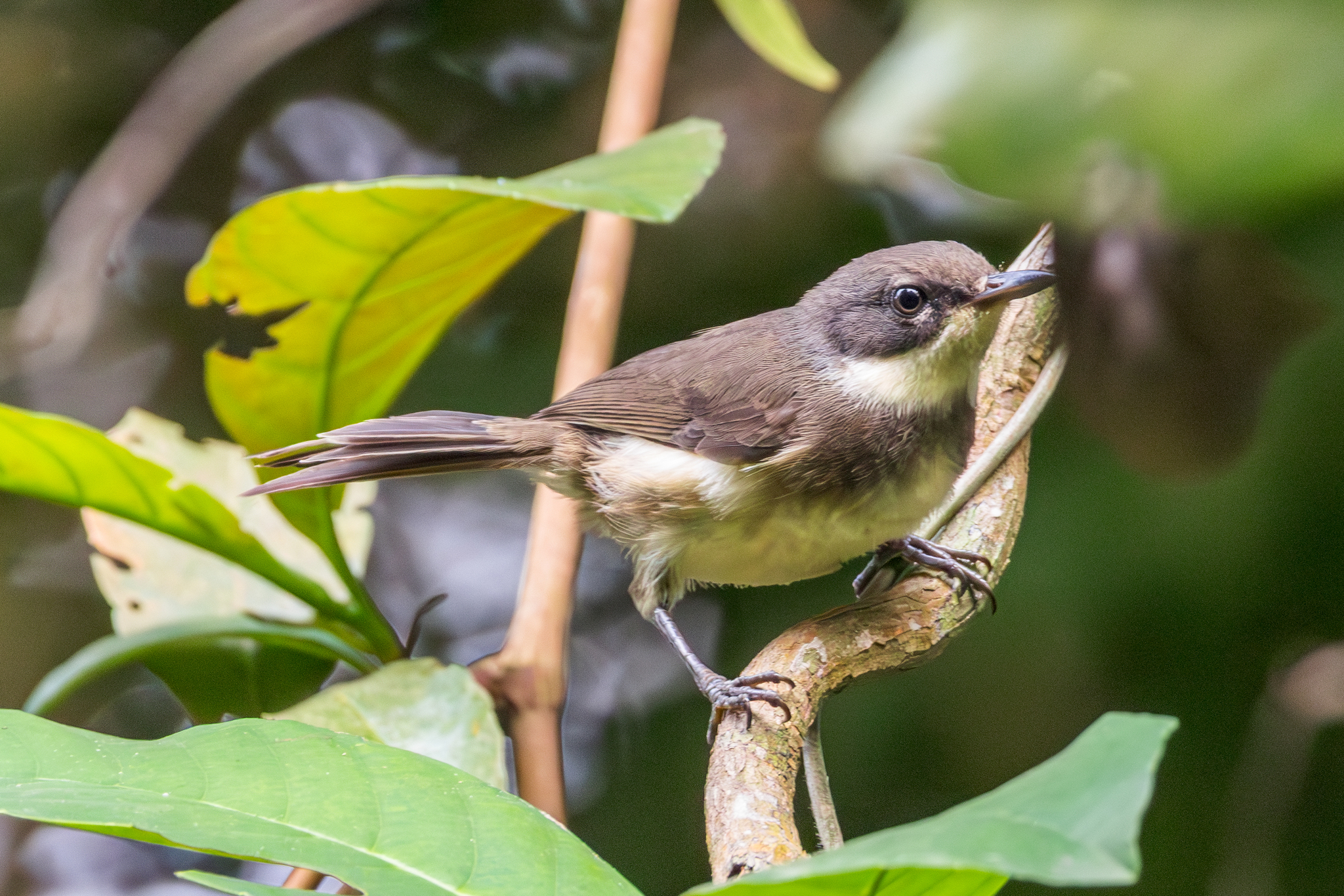
- Dohrn's Thrush-Babbler in Sao Tome and Principe

Conservation status
- Least Concern (IUCN 3.1)

Scientific classification
- Kingdom: Animalia
- Phylum: Chordata
- Class: Aves
- Order: Passeriformes
- Family: Sylviidae
- Genus: Sylvia
- Species: S. dohrni

Binomial name
- Sylvia dohrni (Hartlaub, 1866)
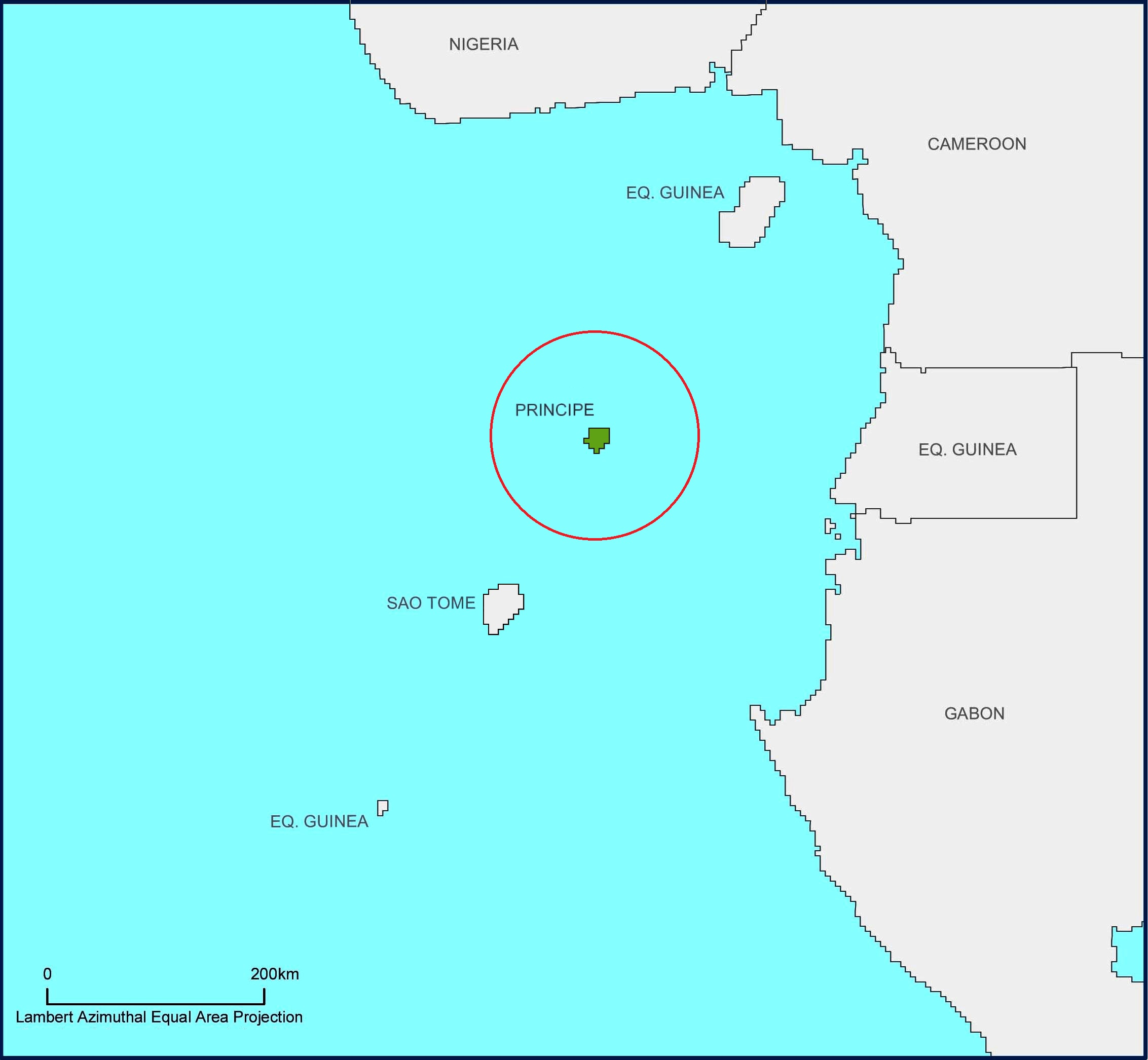
- range

Synonyms
- Horizorhinus dohrni (Hartlaub, 1866)

= Dohrn's warbler =

Species of bird

Dohrn's warbler (Sylvia dohrni), also known as Principe flycatcher-babbler, Dohrn's flycatcher, Dohrn's thrush-babbler, is a species of passerine bird in the family Sylviidae that is endemic to the island of Príncipe which lies off the west coast of Africa in the Gulf of Guinea.

Formerly placed within the genus Horizorhinus, it is now placed in the genus Sylvia based on the results of molecular phylogenetic studies. The specific name honours Heinrich Wolfgang Ludwig Dohrn.
