= Eleutherengonides =

Eleutherengonides Temporal range: Cretaceous–present

Scientific classification
- Kingdom: Animalia
- Phylum: Arthropoda
- Subphylum: Chelicerata
- Class: Arachnida
- Order: Trombidiformes
- Suborder: Prostigmata
- (unranked): Eleutherengonides

Group of mites

Eleutherengonides is a group of mites, ranked as a "supercohort", between the taxonomic rank of order and family.

== Superfamilies and families ==
- Paratydeidae
- Eriophyoidea
- Iolinoidea
- Heterostigmatina
  - Athyreacaridae
  - Crotalorphidae
  - Fembidiacaridae
  - Dolichocyboidea
  - Heterocheyletoidea
  - Pyematoidea
  - Pygmephoroidea
  - Scutacaroidea
  - Tarsocheyloidea
  - Tarsonemoidea
  - Trochometridioidea
- Raphignathae
  - Cheyletoidea
  - Pomerantzioidea
  - Pterygosomatoidea
  - Raphignathoidea
  - Tetranychoidea
