= Labidostomma aethiopica =

Scientific classification
- Domain: Eukaryota
- Kingdom: Animalia
- Phylum: Arthropoda
- Subphylum: Chelicerata
- Class: Arachnida
- Order: Trombidiformes
- Family: Labidostommatidae
- Genus: Labidostomma
- Species: L. aethiopica

Binomial name
- Labidostomma aethiopica Meyer & Ryke, 1959

Species of mite

Labidostomma aethiopica is a species of mite belonging to the family Labidostommatidae. This three-eyed oval mite is fairly large for the family but is still less than 1 mm in length. The body is marked with a reticulated pattern, although this becomes faint towards the back. All the legs are shorter than the body. This species has been recorded from grass and soil in the vicinity of Bathurst, South Africa.
