= Neophyllobius elegans =

Scientific classification
- Kingdom: Animalia
- Phylum: Arthropoda
- Subphylum: Chelicerata
- Class: Arachnida
- Order: Trombidiformes
- Family: Camerobiidae
- Genus: Neophyllobius
- Species: N. elegans

Binomial name
- Neophyllobius elegans Berlese, 1886

Species of mite

Neophyllobius elegans is a species of stilt-legged mite.

== Taxonomy ==
N. elegans was described by Antonio Berlese in 1886, during his initial report of the species. Since that original classification, N. elegans has served as the type species of the genus Neophyllobius.
