= Xenocaligonellididae =

Scientific classification
- Kingdom: Animalia
- Phylum: Arthropoda
- Subphylum: Chelicerata
- Class: Arachnida
- Order: Trombidiformes
- Superfamily: Raphignathoidea
- Family: Xenocaligonellididae; Gonzalez, 1978

Genera
- Apocaligonellidus; Xenocaligonellidus

Synonyms
- Xenocaligonellidae

Small family of acariform mites

Xenocaligonellididae is a small family of acariform mites of the prostigmatan superfamily Raphignathoidea.

They have been found in China, Mexico, Natal and on the Galápagos Islands.

The two genera are:

- Apocaligonellidus Fan & Chen, 2008 - formerly Echinopsis
- Xenocaligonellidus de Leon, 1959
