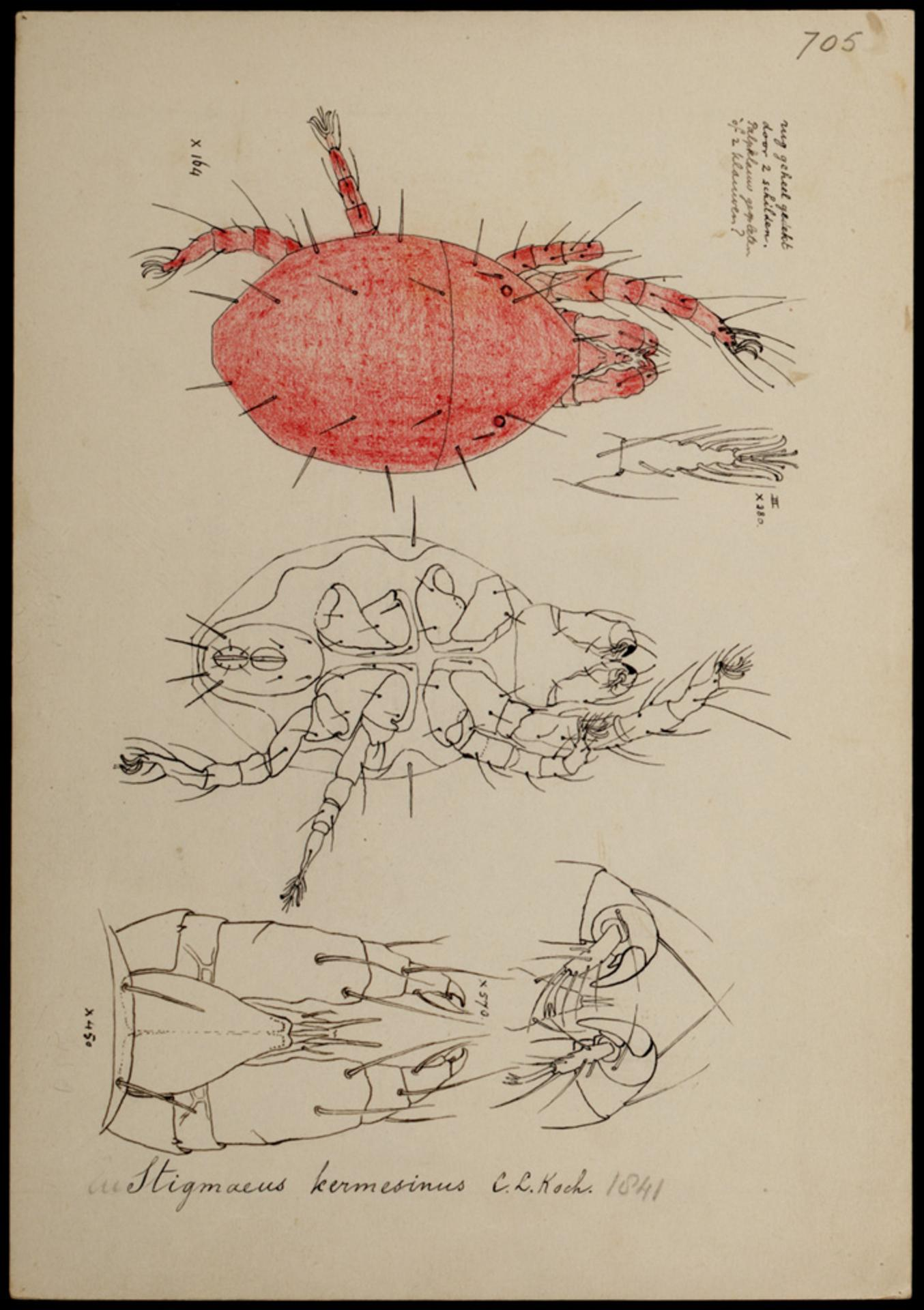
- Eustigmaeus kermesinus (formerly Stigmaeus kermesinus)

Scientific classification
- Kingdom: Animalia
- Phylum: Arthropoda
- Subphylum: Chelicerata
- Class: Arachnida
- Order: Trombidiformes
- Superfamily: Raphignathoidea
- Family: Stigmaeidae; Oudemans, 1931

= Stigmaeidae =

Stigmaeidae Temporal range: Palaeogene–present

Family of mites

Stigmaeidae is a family of prostigmatan mites in the order Trombidiformes. At over 600 species, it is the largest family in superfamily Raphignathoidea. It has a worldwide distribution.

== Description ==
As mites, Stigmaeidae have unsegmented bodies with eight legs (six in larvae). They can be recognised by: prodorsum without transversal groove, sacs or tubes; suranal and aggenital shields separate; cheliceral bases usually separate (rarely fused or conjunct); palps stout with tibial claws at least 1/3 length of tarsus; peritreme absent. Males differ from females in being somewhat tapered posteriorly.

== Life cycle ==
The stigmaeid life cycle has the five stages of egg, larva, protonymph, deutonymph and adult. The larva and two nymph stages are also each followed by a quiescent period. The whole life cycle takes no more than four weeks. Males usually reach adulthood slightly faster than females, allowing them to mate with females as soon as the latter have reached adulthood. Offspring exhibit a female-biased sex ratio (often in the 60-70% range), except for offspring of unmated females which are all male.

Most Stigmaeidae are active year-round, but some species are known to go into diapause for the winter. Overwintering locations include litter at the base of trees and under bark scales on apple.

== Habitat ==
Over a third of Stigmaeidae species are free-living predators that occur on the leaves and branches of plants (e.g. many Agistemus and Zetzellia). There are also stigmaeids (e.g. many Eustigmaeus, Ledermulleriopsis and Stigmaeus) that live in soil and leaf litter and are believed to feed on moss or lichen. A few species live on the surface of freshwater, in animal nests or attached to sandflies.

Some species can survive, feed and even develop while immersed in water, but cannot reproduce.

== Diet ==
Predatory Stigmaeidae have generalist diets, consuming other mites (e.g. spider mites, false spider mites, gall and rust mites and broad mites) as well as small insects (Hemiptera, Lepidoptera) and plant pollen. They usually prefer to feed on immature stages such as eggs. They feed by piercing prey with their chelicerae and sucking out the fluids.

Moss-feeders, such as those in genus Eustigmaeus (formerly Ledermuelleria), feed on moss leaves. They suck out cell contents while leaving the cell walls intact. They can feed and survive on many moss species, though only a few species allow mite reproduction.

Stigmaeidae that attach to sandflies are presumed to be parasitic, leaving behind scars on the abdomens of their hosts.

== Biological control ==
Due to their predatory activity, some stigmaeids (e.g Agistemus exsertus and Zetzellia mali) have been studied for use as biological control agents of pest mites. Modelling indicates that stigmaeids are more effective control agents than phytoseiids at low prey densities (but less effective at high prey densities), and a combination of stigmaeids and phytoseiids is more effective than either predator alone.

== Genera ==
- Agistemus
- Cheylostigmaeus
- Eryngiopus
- Eustigmaeus
- Ledermuelleria
- Ledermuelleriopsis
- Mediolata
- Mullederia
- Primagistemus
- Pseudostigmaeus
- Stigmaeus
- Storchia
- Summersiella
- Zetzellia
