= Syringophilopsis borini =

Scientific classification
- Kingdom: Animalia
- Phylum: Arthropoda
- Subphylum: Chelicerata
- Class: Arachnida
- Order: Trombidiformes
- Family: Syringophilidae
- Genus: Syringophilopsis
- Species: S. borini

Binomial name
- Syringophilopsis borini Bochkov & Mironov, 1999

Species of mite

Syringophilopsis borini is a mite that parasitizes the garden warbler, Sylvia borin, from which it derives its name.
