= Cornutella =

Cornutella may refer to:

- Cornutella (mite), a genus of acari in the family Labidostommatidae
- Cornutella (radiolarian), a genus of radiolarians in the family Theoperidae
