= Raphignathoidea =

Raphignathoidea Temporal range: Palaeogene–present

Scientific classification
- Kingdom: Animalia
- Phylum: Arthropoda
- Subphylum: Chelicerata
- Class: Arachnida
- Order: Trombidiformes
- Suborder: Prostigmata
- Infraorder: Eleutherengona
- Section: Raphignathae
- Superfamily: Raphignathoidea; Kramer, 1877

Families
- 11; see text

Superfamily of mites

Raphignathoidea is a superfamily of the Acari (mite) order Trombidiformes, comprising 1087 species in 62 genera and 12 families.

== Morphology ==
Adult Raphignathoidea are generally oval or round in shape, with 2 pairs of vertical setae on the prodorsum (rarely 3), 2 pairs of scapular setae (rarely 1 or 3), and eyes and postocular bodies usually present. The second and third leg pairs are separated by a gap except in families Cryptognathidae and Raphignathidae. The legs usually bear tarsal claws at the ends.

Females and males look similar except that males are often tapered posteriorly, the first and second pseudanal setae are often reduced, the genital and anal openings are fused, and an aedeagus (male reproductive organ) is present.

== Life cycle ==
Most Raphignathoidea have five life stages: egg, larva, protonymph, deutonymph and adult. The species Agistemus exsertus also has a prelarval stage, while the genus Raphignathus and the family Xenocaligonellididae also have a third nymphal stage, the tritonymph. It generally takes 1-3 weeks for a raphignathoid mite to go from egg to adult, depending on factors such as temperature and diet, with the egg stage having the longest duration. Males develop slightly faster than females.

Adult females that have mated produce mostly female offspring (female-biased sex ratio). Unmated females can also produce offspring, but these offspring are all male (arrhenotoky). Females generally lay 1-4 eggs a day (the rate depending on temperature and diet) over a 1-2 week period.

== Ecology ==
Raphignathoidea contains many predators of small invertebrates, including scale insect crawlers (Coccoidea), whiteflies (Aleyrodidae), caterpillars and other mites. Some Stigmaeidae are herbivores feeding on moss, and some Xenocaligonellididae may be microherbivores feeding on substances on the outer layer of tree bark. There are parasitic and possibly parasitic raphignathoids in the families Stigmaeidae, Dasythyreidae and Dytiscacaridae. Stigmaeidae have been found on sandflies (Phlebotominae), a species of Dasythyreidae has been found on eyed-click beetle (Alaus myops), while Dytiscacaridae are highly specialised parasites living beneath the elytra of aquatic beetles (Dytiscidae).

The superfamily occurs in a range of microhabitats including leaves, branches, tree bark, tree cavities, moss, lichen, animal nests, soil, leaf litter, house dust and stored food products. A few species of Homocaligidae and Stigmaeidae are even aquatic or semi-aquatic.

== Distribution ==
Raphignathoidea mites are abundant on most continents, including a few (e.g. Raphignathus johnstoni) that have colonized Antarctica. However, those of the Neotropical realm (Central America and South America) have received relatively little attention.

== Biological control ==
The predatory Raphignathoidea are of some commercial importance, as many are suitable for biological pest control. They are bred and released to control such plant pests as gall mites (Eriophyidae), spider mites (Tetranychidae) or scale insects in agriculture and forestry.

== Evolution ==
One raphignathoid species, Neophyllobius succineus (Camerobiidae), was discovered in Baltic amber of the Upper Eocene (38–33.9 million years ago).

== Families ==
Most raphignathoid species are in the family Stigmaeidae, with the remaining families being relatively small. Additionally, most of the Raphignathoidea were discovered from 1944 onwards (the year in which family Caligonellidae was described).

- Barbutiidae Robaux, 1975
- Caligonellididae Grandjean, 1944
- Camerobiidae Southcott, 1957
- Cryptognathidae Oudemans, 1902
- Dasythyreidae Walter & Gerson, 1998
- Dytiscacaridae Hajiqanbar & Lindquist, 2018
- Eupalopsellidae Willmann, 1952
- Homocaligidae Wood, 1970
- Mecognathidae Gerson & Walter, 1998
- Raphignathidae Kramer, 1877
- Stigmaeidae Oudemans, 1931
- Xenocaligonellididae Gonzalez, 1978
