= Neophyllobius =

Neophyllobius Temporal range: Palaeogene–present

Scientific classification
- Kingdom: Animalia
- Phylum: Arthropoda
- Subphylum: Chelicerata
- Class: Arachnida
- Order: Trombidiformes
- Family: Camerobiidae
- Genus: Neophyllobius; Berlese, 1886

Type species
- Neophyllobius elegans Berlese, 1886

Species
- Neophyllobius elegans; Neophyllobius kamalii; Neophyllobius lalbaghensis; Neophyllobius lorestanicus; Neophyllobius ostovani; Neophyllobius quercus; Neophyllobius sturmerwoodi; Neophyllobius zolfigolii

Genus of mites

Neophyllobius is a genus of mites.
