= Adamystidae =

Scientific classification
- Kingdom: Animalia
- Phylum: Arthropoda
- Subphylum: Chelicerata
- Class: Arachnida
- Order: Trombidiformes
- Suborder: Prostigmata
- Infraorder: Anystina
- Superfamily: Adamystoidea
- Family: Adamystidae

Family of mites

Adamystidae is a family of mites in the order Trombidiformes. There are at least three genera, one of which is extinct, in Adamystidae. It is the sole family in the monotypic superfamily Adamystoidea.

== Genera ==
These three genera belong to the family Adamystidae:

- Adamystis Cunliffe, 1957
- Nannodromus Fernandez, Coineau, Theron & Tiedt, 2014
- Saxidromus Coineau, 1974
