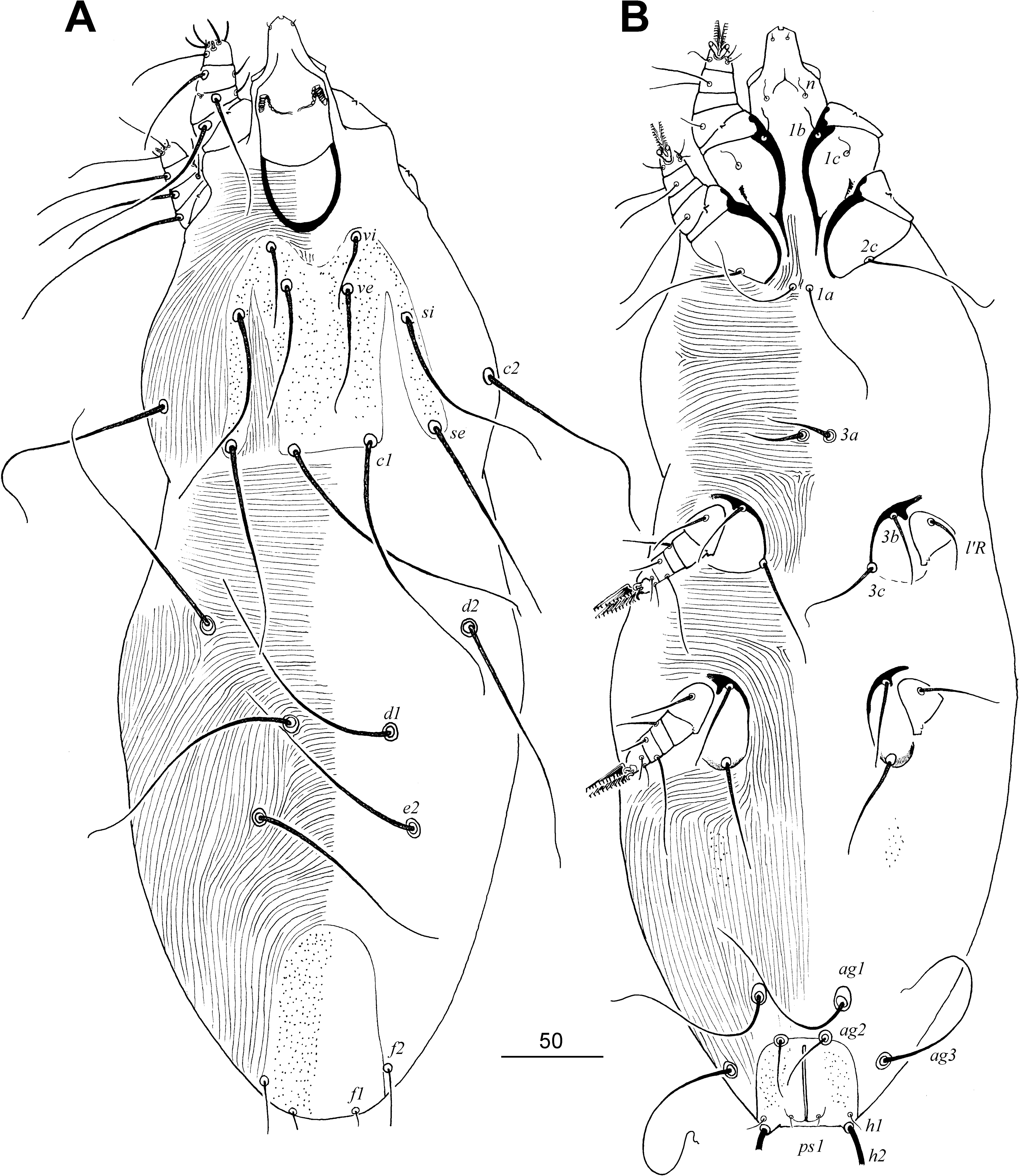
- Tanopicobia trachyphoni (Picobiinae) dorsal and ventral view

Scientific classification
- Kingdom: Animalia
- Phylum: Arthropoda
- Subphylum: Chelicerata
- Class: Arachnida
- Order: Trombidiformes
- Suborder: Prostigmata
- Infraorder: Eleutherengona
- Superfamily: Cheyletoidea
- Family: Syringophilidae; Lavoipierre, 1953

= Syringophilidae =

Family of mites

Syringophilidae is a family of mites, commonly known as quill mites. They are obligatory ectoparasites of birds, and inhabit their feather quills where they feed on subcutaneous tissue and fluids. Typically the Syringophilinae inhabit all but the body feathers (primaries, secondaries, tertials, rectrices and wing coverts), while the Picobinae specialize in infecting the body feathers internally. Quill mites have been recorded from hundreds of bird species, belonging to 95 families and 24 orders. Much knowledge of their hosts, diversity and systematics has been obtained since the late 1990s, but as of 2020 these were still considered to be poorly known.

== Life cycle ==
A single fertilized female enters the soft calamus of a developing feather through the opening called superior umbilicus. When this is getting closed, it produces offspring; a single male and several females, which develop within this enclosed space. The offspring then fertilize each other and produce one more generation still enclosed here. Again, only a single male offspring is produced by each female, which will fertilize their sisters and cousins. Finally, fertilized females disperse to look for new feathers on the same host bird or on another one. The most frequent type of transmission is the parent-offspring route. Due to this peculiar life cycle, quill mite populations are highly inbred and subjected to an extremely reduced (if any) sexual selection pressure.

== Symbionts ==
They may host strains of Wolbachia, an intracellular bacterial genus. Additionally Spiroplasma bacteria are suspected symbionts, besides potentially the pathogens Anaplasma phagocytophilum, Brucella and Bartonella.

== Genera ==
The family contains the following genera:

- Ascetomylla Kethley, 1970
- Aulobia Kethley, 1970
- Aulonastus Kethley, 1970
- Bubophilus J. R. Philips & R. A. Norton, 1978
- Calamincola Casto, 1978
- Castosyringophilus Bochkov & Perez, 2003
- Charadriphilus Bochkov & Chistyakov, 2001
- Chenophila Kethley, 1970
- Colinophilus Kethley, 1973
- Creagonycha Kethley, 1970
- Dissonus Skoracki, 1999
- Ixobrychiphilus Skoracki, Zmudzinski & Solarczyk, 2017
- Kalamotrypetes S. D. Casto, 1980
- Kethleyana Kivganov, in Kivganov & Sharafat 1995
- Megasyringophilus Fain, Bochkov & Mironov, 2000
- Mironovia Chirov & Kravtsova, 1995
- Neoaulobia Fain, Bochkov & Mironov, 2000
- Neoaulonastus Skoracki, 2004
- Niglarobia Kethley, 1970
- Peristerophila Kethley, 1970
- Philoxanthornia Kethley, 1970
- Phipicobia Glowska & Schmidt, 2014
- Picobia Haller, 1878
- Procellariisyringophilus Schmidt & Skoracki, 2007 (nom. nov. pro Syringonomus Kethley 1970 non Hope & Murphy, 1969)
- Psittaciphilus Fain, Bochkov & Mironov, 2000
- Selenonycha Kethley, 1970
- Stibarokris Kethley, 1970
- Syringonomus Kethley, 1970
- Syringophiloidus Kethley, 1970
- Syringophilopsis Kethley, 1970
- Syringophilus Heller, 1880
- Terratosyringophilus Bochkov & Perez, 2003
- Torotrogla Kethley, 1970
- Trypetoptila Kethley, 1970
