= Isospora sylvianthina =

Scientific classification
- Domain: Eukaryota
- Clade: Diaphoretickes
- Clade: SAR
- Clade: Alveolata
- Phylum: Apicomplexa
- Class: Conoidasida
- Order: Eucoccidiorida
- Family: Eimeriidae
- Genus: Isospora
- Species: I. sylvianthina

Binomial name
- Isospora sylvianthina (Schwalbach, 1959)

Species of single-celled organism

Isospora sylvianthina is a species of internal parasites classified under Coccidia. It frequently occurs in the Eurasian blackcap and the garden warbler.

== Cited texts ==
- Dolnik, Olga (2003). Some aspects of the biology and host-parasite interactions of Isospora spp. (Protozoa: Coccidiida) of passerine birds. Oldenburg: Oldenburg University.
