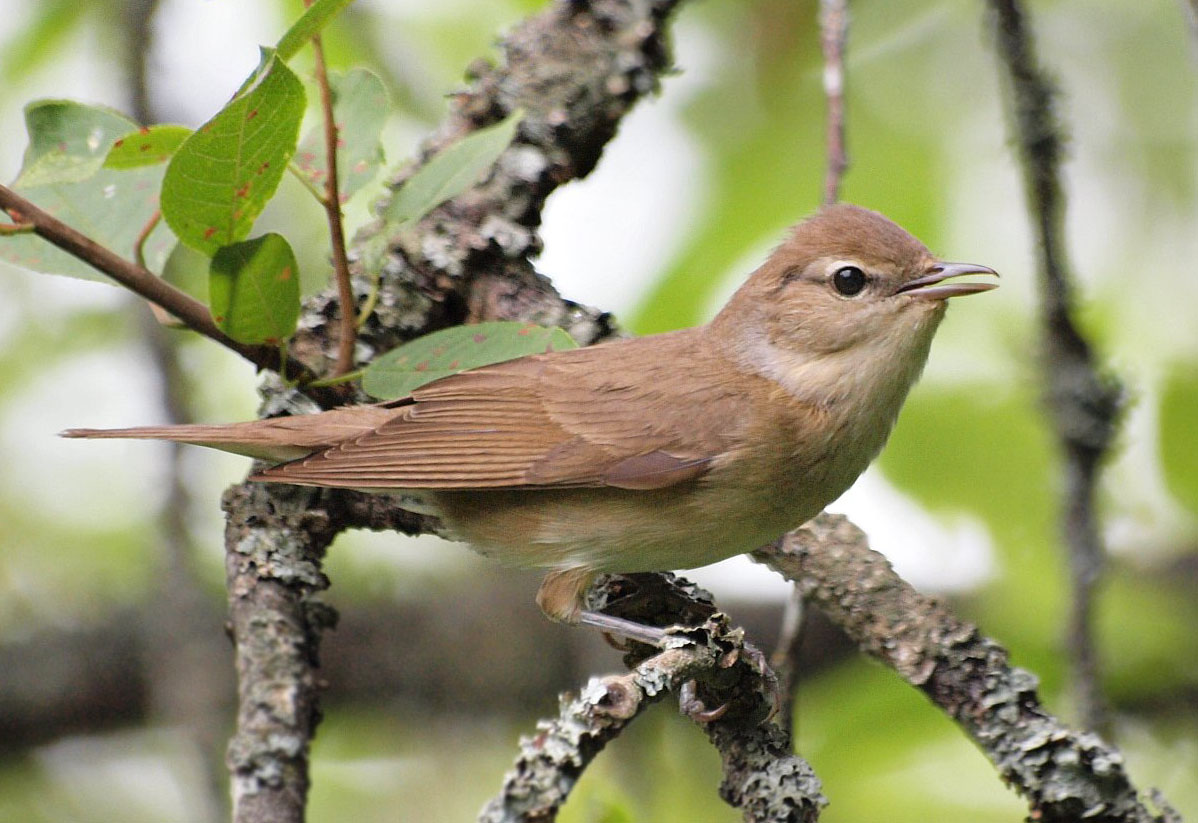
- The nominate subspecies in Sweden
- Male singing, recorded in Surrey, England

Conservation status
- Least Concern (IUCN 3.1)

Scientific classification
- Kingdom: Animalia
- Phylum: Chordata
- Class: Aves
- Order: Passeriformes
- Family: Sylviidae
- Genus: Sylvia
- Species: S. borin

Binomial name
- Sylvia borin (Boddaert, 1783)

Subspecies
- S. b. borin (Boddaert, 1783); S. b. woodwardi (Sharpe, 1877)
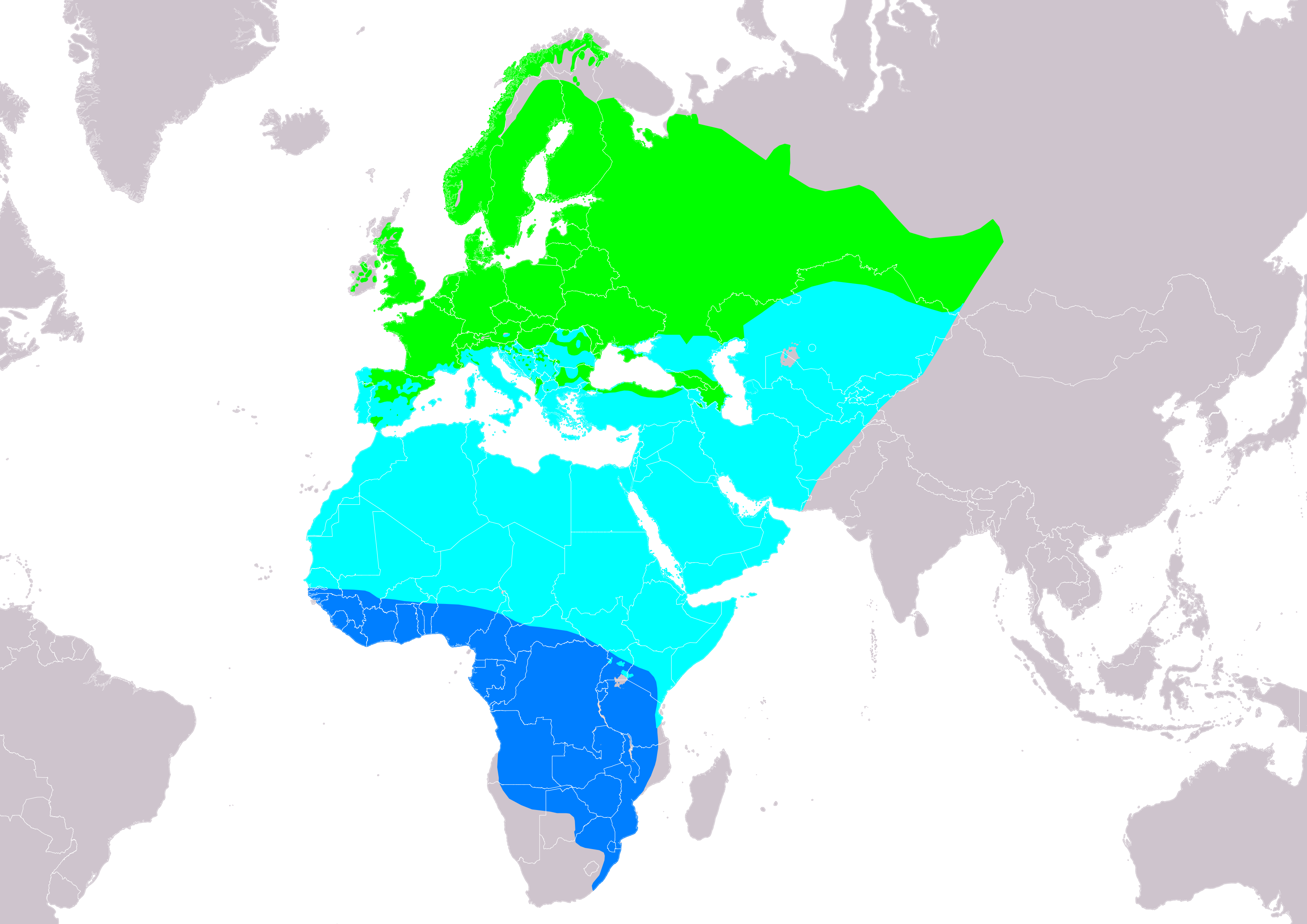
- Range of S. borin (Compiled by: BirdLife International and Handbook of the Birds of the World (2016) 2009.) Breeding Passage Non-breeding

= Garden warbler =

Small migratory passerine bird

The garden warbler (Sylvia borin) is a common and widespread small bird that breeds in most of Europe and in the Palearctic to western Siberia. It is a plain, long-winged and long-tailed warbler with brown upperparts and dull white underparts; the sexes are similar and juveniles resemble the adults. Its two subspecies differ only slightly and interbreed where their ranges overlap. Due to its lack of distinguishing features, this species can be confused with a number of other unstreaked warblers. The garden warbler's rich melodic song is similar to that of the blackcap, its closest relative, which competes with it for territory when nesting in the same woodland.

The preferred breeding habitat in Eurasia is open woodland with dense low cover for nesting; despite its name, gardens are rarely occupied by this small passerine bird. The clutch of four or five blotched cream or white eggs is laid in a robust cup-shaped nest built near the ground and concealed by dense vegetation. The eggs are incubated for 11–12 days. The chicks are altricial, hatching naked and with closed eyes, and are fed by both parents. They fledge about 10 days after hatching. Only about a quarter of young birds survive their first year. The garden warbler is strongly migratory, wintering in sub-Saharan Africa. A wide range of habitats are used in Africa, but closed forest and treeless Sahel are both shunned. Insects are the main food in the breeding season, although fruit predominates when birds are fattening prior to migration, figs being a particular favourite where available. These warblers have a mixed diet of insects and fruit in their African wintering grounds.

The garden warbler is hunted by Eurasian sparrowhawks and domestic cats, and its eggs and nestlings are taken by a variety of mammalian and avian predators. It may be host to various fleas, mites and internal parasites, and it is a host of the common cuckoo, a brood parasite. The large and fairly stable numbers and huge range of the garden warbler mean that it is classed as least concern by the International Union for Conservation of Nature. Despite a small population decline in much of its European range, the bird's breeding distribution is expanding northwards in Scandinavia.

== Taxonomy ==
The genus Sylvia forms part of a large family of Old World warblers, the Sylviidae. Fossils from France show that the genus dates back at least 20 million years. The garden warbler and its nearest relative, the blackcap, are an ancient species pair which diverged very early from the rest of the genus, between 12 and 16 million years ago. In the course of time, these two species have become sufficiently distinctive that they have been placed in separate subgenera, with the blackcap in subgenus Sylvia and the garden warbler in Epilais. These sister species have a breeding range which extends farther northeast than all other Sylviid species except the lesser whitethroat and greater whitethroat.

The nearest relatives of the garden warbler outside the sister group are believed to be the African hill babbler and Dohrn's thrush-babbler.

The garden warbler was given the binomial name Motacilla borin by the Dutch naturalist Pieter Boddaert in 1783. The current genus name is from Modern Latin silvia, a woodland nymph, related to silva, a wood. The specific borin is derived from a local name for the bird in the Genoa area of Italy; it derives from the Latin bos, ox, because the warbler was believed to accompany oxen.

In the 19th and early 20th centuries there was some uncertainty as to the correct authority for this species. Various names were used including Sylvia salicaria Linnaeus 1766, and Sylvia simplex Latham 1787. Confusingly, the species was also known as Sylvia hortensis Bechstein 1802, where hortensis is the specific epithet of the western Orphean warbler.

There are two recognised subspecies.

- Sylvia borin borin (Boddaert, 1783), the nominate subspecies, breeds in western, northern and central Europe to Finland, central Poland, western Hungary and Bosnia.
- S. b. woodwardi (Sharpe, 1877), named for Sharpe's collaborator Bernard Barham Woodward, breeds in eastern Europe and temperate Asia east to western Siberia.

Intermediate birds occur where the recognised forms meet and interbreed, and have sometimes been given subspecies status, including S. b. kreczmeri in Poland and S. b. pateffi in Bulgaria, but these are not generally accepted as valid taxa.

== Description ==
The garden warbler is 14 cm (5.5 in) long with a 7.6–8.4 cm (3.0–3.3 in) wing length. The weight is typically 16–22 g (0.56–0.78 oz), but can be up to 35.5 g (1.25 oz) for birds preparing to migrate. It is a plain, long-winged and long-tailed bird with unstreaked olive-brown upperparts and dull white underparts. It has a whitish eyering and a faint pale supercilium, and there is a buff wash to the throat and flanks. The eye is black, the legs are bluish-grey and the strong bill has a grey upper and paler grey lower mandible. The male and female are indistinguishable by external appearance including size. Juveniles have a looser plumage than an adult, with paler and greyer upperparts and a buff tone to the underparts. The eastern subspecies S. b. woodwardi is slightly larger and paler than the nominate form with a greyer tone to the upperparts and whiter underparts. The subspecies are hard to distinguish visually where they occur together in Africa, but a wing length greater than 80 mm (3.1 in) confirms S. b. woodwardi when birds are trapped.

The plain appearance of the garden warbler means that it can be confused with several other species. The melodious and icterine warblers usually have long bills and a yellowish tint to their plumage. The booted warbler is similar in colour, although it is smaller, more delicately built and has a flesh-coloured bill. Western and eastern olivaceous warblers are also relatively small, and have white outer tail feathers as well as a pinkish bill. Juvenile barred warblers, which lack the obvious barring of adults, are much larger than garden warblers and have a pale double wingbar.

Juvenile garden warblers have a partial moult mainly involving the body plumage between June and September prior to migration. Adults also have a similar, but sometimes more extensive, partial moult in late summer, and a complete moult in their African wintering areas before the return migration.

=== Voice ===
The male's song, usually delivered by birds in dense cover, is a rich musical warbling usually delivered in bursts of a few seconds duration, but sometimes for longer periods. The song is confusable with that of the blackcap, although compared to that species it is slightly lower-pitched, less broken into discrete song segments and more mellow. Both species have a quiet subsong, a muted version of the full song, which is much more difficult to separate. The most frequent call of the garden warbler is a sharp kek-kek, which is repeated rapidly when the bird is alarmed. A quiet rasping tchurr-r-r-r resembling the main call of the common whitethroat is also sometimes heard. The juvenile has a quia alarm vocalisation. Subsong may be heard on the wintering grounds in Africa, developing into the full song in March and April prior to the return to Europe.

== Distribution and habitat ==
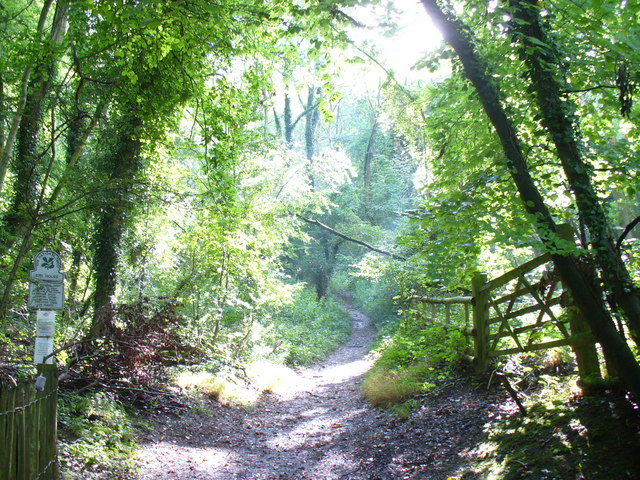
Deciduous woodland is the preferred breeding habitat.

The garden warbler breeds in most of Europe between the 12–28 °C (54–82 °F) isotherms and east across temperate Asia to the Yenisei River in Siberia. Its range extends further north than any other Sylvia warbler. All populations are migratory, wintering in sub-Saharan Africa as far south as South Africa. Birds from central Europe initially migrate to the southwest, reorientating to the south or southeast once in Africa, although Scandinavian migrants may head south through the Alps and across the Mediterranean Sea. S. b. woodwardi reaches Africa by a more easterly route, many birds passing through the Arabian Peninsula. When garden warblers cross the Sahara, they fly at night, resting motionless and without feeding in suitable shade during the day. During their journey, they can metabolise not only body fat but also up to 19% of their breast and leg muscles and 39% of their digestive tract. Many birds pause for a few days to feed after the desert crossing before continuing further south.

The nominate subspecies occurs in the western and central parts of the winter range, although some birds occur as far east as Kenya. S. b. woodwardi winters in eastern and southern Africa. Movements in Africa are poorly known, although at least some birds return to the same location in subsequent years. There are only a handful of records of birds recorded in Europe in winter, from Corsica, the UK and Ireland. Spring migration routes are poorly known, but appear to lie more directly across the Mediterranean. This warbler has occurred as a vagrant in Afghanistan, Djibouti, Iceland, São Tomé and Príncipe, Somalia, Yemen, Svalbard, Jan Mayen and Madeira.

The breeding habitat of the garden warbler is open areas with dense bushes, including thickets and woodland edges. Shady areas and a bushy or herbaceous undergrowth are preferred, as are woods adjacent to rivers or reed beds; in Ireland it favours thickets on the shores of small lakes. A tolerance of willow, alder and birch allows it to breed farther north and at higher altitudes than any other European Sylvia warbler. Mature conifers and dense plantations are avoided, although young conifer plantations with thick undergrowth are suitable for nesting. Despite its name, it is not a bird of gardens. In Africa, a wide range of habitats with trees are used, although closed forests and arid areas are again avoided. This warbler occurs at altitudes of up to 2,600 m (8,500 ft) in suitable mountain woodland, although in East Africa it is usually found at a lower altitude than the blackcap, and in moister areas than the common whitethroat.

== Behaviour ==
=== Breeding ===
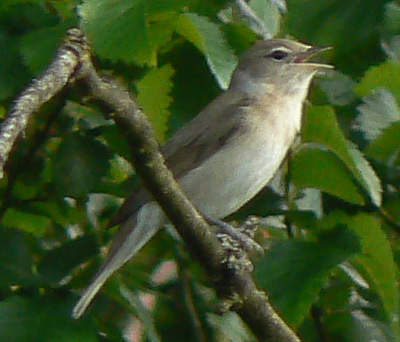
Singing male in England

Garden warblers first breed when they are one year old, and are mainly monogamous, although the male at least may sometimes deviate from this. When males return to their breeding areas, they establish a territory. Sylvia warblers are unusual in that they vigorously defend their territories against other species in their genus as well as conspecifics. Blackcaps and garden warblers use identical habits in the same woods, yet aggressive interactions mean that their territories never overlap. Similar songs are a feature of the Sylvia warblers as a group, and it has been suggested that this promotes interspecific competition and helps to segregate territories between related species. However, it appears more likely from later studies that segregation of sympatric species, other than the blackcap and garden warbler, is due to subtle differences in habitat preferences rather than interspecies aggression. There are typically 3–9 territories per hectare (1.2–3.6 per acre), but in prime habitat, such as moist willow or birch woodland or young deciduous regrowth, there may be more than 10 pairs per hectare (4 per acre). Individual territories are similar in size to those of blackcaps at 0.2–0.76 ha (0.49–1.88 acres).

A male attracts a female to his territory through song and a display which involves rapid wing beating while perched. He will also build a number of simple nests (cock's nests) to show to his mate, although only rarely will she complete the structure, usually starting afresh. The nest is concealed in vegetation, the nature of which depends on local availability. Rubus species are commonly used in temperate regions, with willow predominating in alpine valleys. Sometimes, particularly in stinging nettles, the nest may be built around a number of vertical stems, in the manner of a reed warbler. The nest is normally between 0.3 and 1.2 m (0.98 and 3.94 ft) above the ground, and very rarely higher than 2 m (6.6 ft). The nest is a cup of dry grass, moss and twigs, with a soft lining of finer plant material or hair. It is larger and heavier than a blackcap's nest, averaging 8.3 cm (3.3 in) high and 11.2 cm (4.4 in) wide with a cup 5.5 cm (2.2 in) deep and 6.3 cm (2.5 in) wide.

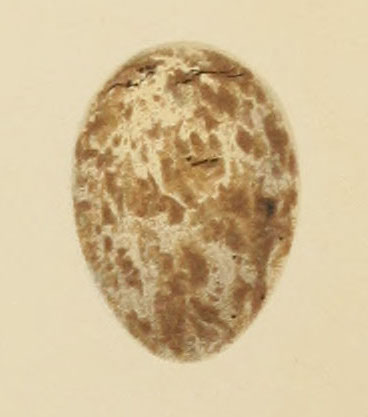
Painting of an egg

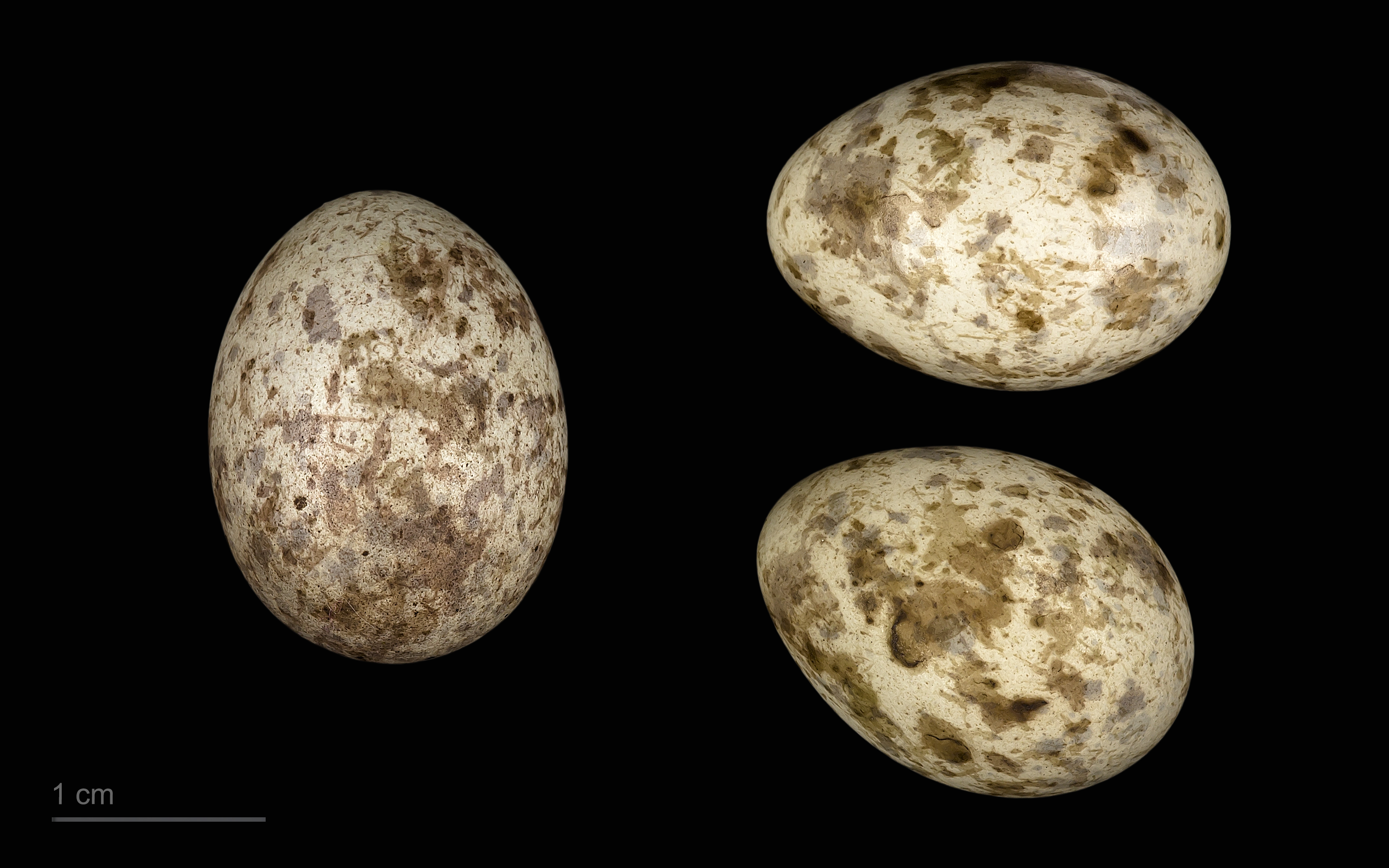
Cuculus canorus canorus in a clutch of Sylvia borin borin - MHNT

The first eggs are laid in late April in southern Germany, early May in northwest Europe, and late May in Finland. The season is prolonged with some birds nesting as late as July. The clutch is typically four or five eggs (range two to six), which are usually whitish or buff with grey, purple and brown blotches. The average size of the egg is 20 mm × 15 mm (0.79 in × 0.59 in), and it weighs 2.2 g (0.078 oz), of which 6% is shell. The eggs are incubated for 11–12 days by both adults, although only the female stays on the nest at night. The chicks are altricial, hatching naked and with closed eyes, and are fed by both parents. They fledge about 10 days after hatching (range 9–12), leaving the nest shortly before they are able to fly. They are assisted with feeding for a further two weeks, and the family may stay together for a few days after that. The short incubation and fledging times may be a result of predation pressure, the rapid development of the chicks enabling them to leave the vulnerable nest as early as possible, even while still flightless. This avoids the possible loss of an entire brood, but means that the adults must provide food to the young for a significant period until they can fend for themselves. One brood per year is normal, although a few second broods are known.

The southward migration starts in mid-July, with larger numbers departing in August and peaking in early September. Most adults have gone by mid-September, although juveniles may linger for another month.

On average, just over 50% of breeding pairs are successful in producing at least one fledged young from a nest, with early breeding and low population density being factors increasing success. In the UK, more than 50% of the failures are due to predation and about 30% result from food shortages in bad weather. The annual survival rate is about 50% for adults and 26% for juveniles in their first year. The typical lifespan is two years, but a bird in Sweden lived to ten years and two months. Much greater ages, up to 24 years, have been recorded in captive garden warblers.

=== Feeding ===
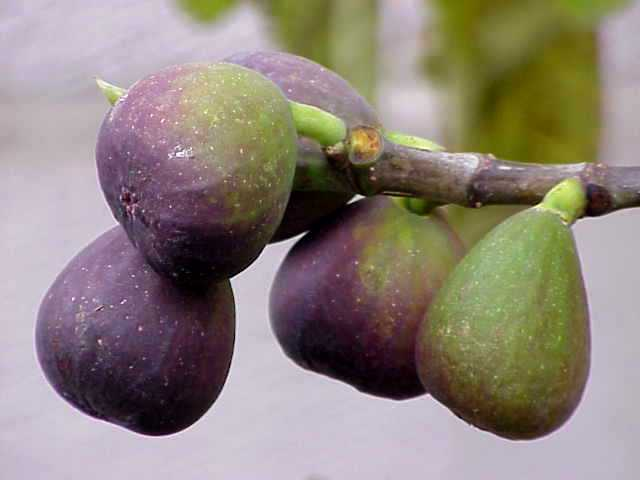
The common fig is a popular food prior to migration.

The garden warbler feeds mainly on insects in the breeding season, although other small invertebrates such as spiders are also eaten. It picks its prey off leaves and twigs, sometimes hovering to do so. It normally forages at less than 6 m (20 ft) above the ground. After nesting, there is a genetically controlled switch to a fruit diet, although insects are still consumed while the birds fatten prior to migration; birds gain weight more rapidly from a diet containing both fruit and insects than either alone. Berries and other soft fruit are preferred, and figs are particularly important for birds preparing to migrate. This predilection gives rise to the Italian beccafico (fig pecker) and Portuguese felosa-das-figueiras (fig-tree warbler) as names for this species. On this diet a bird can gain weight quickly and the liver increases the rate at which it produces fatty acids for storage in adipose tissue.

In Africa, the warbler eats insects as well as berries, and the fruits of the introduced Spanish flag is a favourite where present. An increase in body mass occurs again before the northward migration, birds fattening even more rapidly than prior to their southward journey. Most internal organs (including the liver, spleen, intestines, kidneys and heart) and the flight muscles lose weight during the journey over the Sahara, although the testes quadruple in mass in preparation for the breeding season. Unlike drier-habitat species like the common whitethroat, they leave from savanna rather than the treeless Sahel further north.

Fruit is normally picked by a perched bird, although there is a record of a mulberry fruit being taken in flight. Garden warblers often feed with conspecifics and other fruit-eating passerines. Over 35 plant species have been recorded as food for this warbler just in central Europe, with many additional species being consumed in the Mediterranean region and on the African wintering grounds.

== Predators and parasites ==
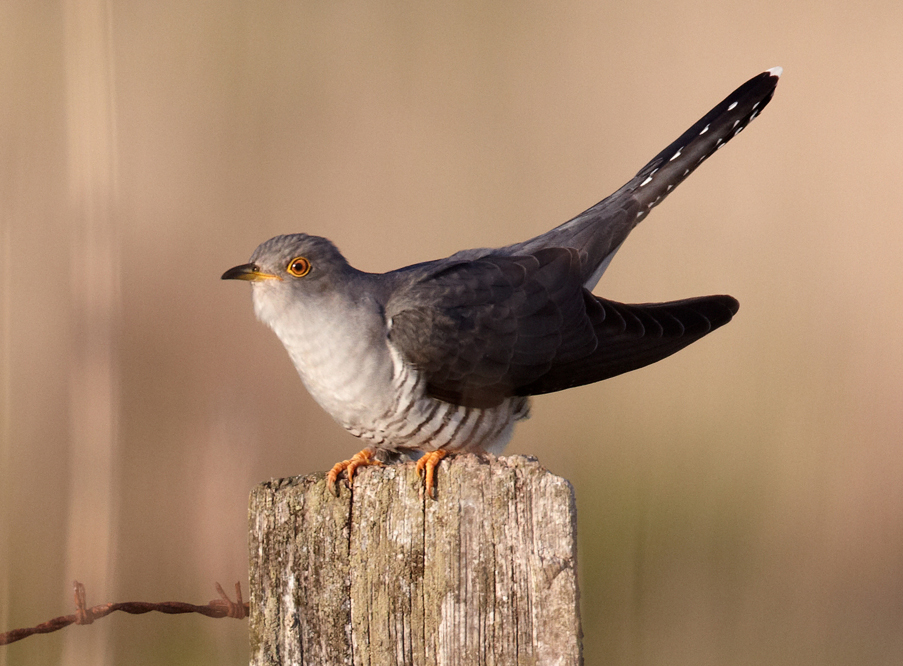
The common cuckoo is a brood parasite of the garden warbler.

The main predators of the garden warbler are Eurasian sparrowhawks and domestic cats. Some falcons will also take adults, and the Eleonora's falcon hunts the garden warbler and many other small passerines as they migrate across the Mediterranean. Eurasian jays and Eurasian magpies take the eggs and young of warblers, as do mammals such as stoats, weasels and squirrels. The garden warbler is a host of the common cuckoo, a brood parasite. The blackcap has a much lower level of parasitism than its relative because the cuckoo's eggs are often rejected.

External parasites of the garden warbler include the fleas Ceratophyllus gallinae and Dasypsyllus gallinulae and the mite Syringophilopsis borini, named after its host. Two species of protozoan parasites in the genus Isospora occur in garden warblers, I. sylvianthina and I. sylviae. Samples from two sites showed infection levels above 74% and 28% respectively for the two species. The extent of infection does not impact on the bird's body mass or the amount of body fat. Three strains of another protozoan, Haemoproteus parabelopolskyi are found only in the garden warbler, and form a monophyletic group. Seventeen further members of that group are found only in the blackcap, and another three occur in the African hill babbler, supporting the shared ancestry of the three bird species.

== Status ==
The garden warbler has a very large range of 9,650,000 km^{2} (3,730,000 sq mi), and its population in Europe is estimated at 17–31 million breeding pairs. Allowing for birds breeding in Asia, the total population is between 54 and 124 million individuals. There is no evidence of any serious decline in numbers, so it is classified by the International Union for Conservation of Nature as being of least concern.

There has been a slight decline in numbers in Europe since 1980, although the Scandinavian population is growing. Climate change appears to be affecting the migration pattern of the garden warbler and blackcap. Both are arriving in Europe earlier than previously, and blackcaps and juvenile (but not adult) garden warblers are departing nearly two weeks later than in the 1980s. Birds of both species are longer-winged and lighter than in the past, suggesting a longer migration as the breeding range expands northwards.

== In culture ==
In his History of Animals, Aristotle considered that the garden warbler eventually metamorphosed into a blackcap. The composer Olivier Messiaen used the song of the garden warbler as the basis for his 1971 solo piano piece La fauvette des jardins, the title being the French name of the species. His Turangalîla-Symphonie, a major work inspired by the legend of Tristan and Iseult, has a summer garden scene as its sixth movement. This features the song of the warbler, along with those of the nightingale and blackbird.

The garden warbler is prized as a gastronomic delicacy in Mediterranean countries. French epicure Jean Anthelme Brillat-Savarin said of the warbler when cooked like ortolan bunting "if it were the size of a pheasant, it would be worth an acre of land". An Italian stuffed sardine dish sarde a beccafico derives its name from its supposed resemblance to the cooked birds, known in that country as beccafico, fig-pecker.

Old names for the garden warbler, such as strawsmear, small straw and haychat, are often derived from its choice of nesting material, although the commonest of the English folk names was "pettychaps". These names were often shared with other warblers including the blackcap, common whitethroat and common chiffchaff.

== Cited texts ==
- Arnason, Johann; Murphy, Peter (2001). Agon, Logos, Polis: The Greek Achievement and Its Aftermath. Wiesbaden: Franz Steiner. ISBN 978-3-515-07747-7.
- Baker, Kevin (1997). Warblers of Europe, Asia and North Africa (Helm Identification Guides). London: Helm. ISBN 978-0-7136-3971-1.
- Benítez, Vincent P (2008). Olivier Messiaen: A Research and Information Guide. London: Routledge. ISBN 978-0-415-97372-4.
- Boddaert, Pieter (1783). Table des Planches Enluminéez d'Histoire Naturelle de M. D'Aubenton (in French). Utrecht: sine nomine.
- Cocker, Mark; Mabey, Richard (2005). Birds Britannica. London: Chatto & Windus. ISBN 978-0-7011-6907-7.
- Coombes, Allen J (2011). RSPB Wildlife of Britain. London: Dorling Kindersley. ISBN 978-1-4053-6709-7.
- Dolnik, Olga (2003). Some aspects of the biology and host-parasite interactions of Isospora spp. (Protozoa: Coccidiida) of passerine birds (PhD Dissertation). Oldenburg: Oldenburg University.
- Gibbons, D W; Amar, A; Anderson, G Q A; Bolton, M; Bradbury, R B; Eaton, M A; Evans, A D; Grant, M C; Gregory, R D; Hilton, G M; Hirons, G J M; Hughes, J; Johnstone, I; Newbery, P; Peach, W J; Ratcliffe, N; Smith, K W; Summers, R W; Walton, P; Wilson J D (2007). The predation of wild birds in the UK: a review of its conservation impact and management (PDF). Sandy, Bedfordshire: Royal Society for the Protection of Birds. ISBN 978-1-905601-02-8.
- Jobling, James A (2010). The Helm Dictionary of Scientific Bird Names (PDF). London: Christopher Helm. ISBN 978-1-4081-2501-4.
- Johnson, Robert Sherlaw (1992). Messiaen. Berkeley: University of California Press. ISBN 978-0-520-06734-9.
- Locatelli, Giorgio (2011). Made in Sicily. London: HarperCollins. ISBN 978-0-00-743369-8.
- Mann, Clive F; Brammer, Frederik; Fuller, Richard A (2012). Cuckoos of the World. London: Christopher Helm Publishers. ISBN 978-0-7136-6034-0.
- Mason, C F (1995). The Blackcap (Hamlyn Species Guides). London: Hamlyn. ISBN 978-0-600-58006-5.
- Montagné, Prosper; Turgeon, Charlotte Snyder (1988). The new Larousse gastronomique. New York: Crown. ISBN 978-0-517-53137-2.
- Newton, Ian (2010). Bird Migration (Collins New Naturalist Library 113). London: Collins. ISBN 978-0-00-730732-6.
- Sharpe, Richard Bowdler (1877). Catalogue of Birds in the British Museum. Volume 3. London: British Museum.
- Shirihai, Hadoram; Gargallo, Gabriel; Helbig, Andreas; Harris, Alan; Cottridge, David (2001). Sylvia Warblers: Identification, Taxonomy and Phylogeny of the Genus Sylvia. London: A & C Black. ISBN 978-0-7136-3984-1.
- Simms, Eric (1985). British Warblers (New Naturalist Series). London: Collins. ISBN 978-0-00-219810-3.
- Snow, Barbara; Snow, David (2010). Birds and Berries (Poyser Monographs). London: Poyser. ISBN 978-1-4081-3821-2.
- Snow, David; Perrins, Christopher M, eds. (1998). The Birds of the Western Palearctic concise edition (2 volumes). Oxford: Oxford University Press. ISBN 978-0-19-854099-1.
- Walter, Harmut (1979). Eleonora's Falcon: adaptations to prey and habitat in a social raptor. Chicago: University of Chicago Press. ISBN 978-0-226-87229-2.
- Zimmerman, Dale A; Turner, Donald A; Pearson, David J (1996). Birds of Kenya and Northern Tanzania. Princeton: Princeton University Press. ISBN 978-0-691-02658-9.
