= Neoaulonastus =

Scientific classification
- Kingdom: Animalia
- Phylum: Arthropoda
- Subphylum: Chelicerata
- Class: Arachnida
- Order: Trombidiformes
- Family: Syringophilidae
- Genus: Neoaulonastus; Skoracki, 2004

Genus of mites

Neoaulonastus is a genus of mite.

== Species ==
- Neoaulonastus grannatina Skoracki, Hromada & Unsoeld, 2013
- Neoaulonastus quelea Skoracki, Hromada & Unsoeld, 2013
- Neoaulonastus tanzanicus Skoracki, Hromada & Unsoeld, 2013
