= Dytiscacarus =

Scientific classification
- Kingdom: Animalia
- Phylum: Arthropoda
- Subphylum: Chelicerata
- Class: Arachnida
- Order: Trombidiformes
- Family: Dytiscacaridae; Hajiqanbar and Lindquist, 2018
- Genus: Dytiscacarus; Hajiqanbar and Lindquist, 2018

Species
- See text

Genus of mites

Dytiscacarus is a genus of trombidiform mites that are sub-elytral parasites of diving beetles (Dytiscidae). It is in the monotypic family Dytiscacaridae, and comprises three species. It has been recorded from Iran and the United States.

== Morphology ==
The family has three distinctive features not found in other mites (autapomorphies): the infracapitulum has a pair of gnathosomatic neostigmata on its dorsal face, the movable cheliceral stylets are sheathed and can be deeply retracted into the prosoma, and the pretarsi of all legs lack empodia and bear paired claws strongly modified into sclerotized tenent-like structures (to attach to hosts). These features occur in all of the active life stages. Dytiscacaridae are also sexually dimorphic: females have the fourth pair of legs elongated (possibly for greater mobility), while males have a caudal copulatory capsule.

== Biology ==
Dytiscacaridae spend their life cycle under the elytra of Dytiscidae beetles. The eggs are laid on the inner surface of the elytra, being glued there by a gelatinous substance. It is possible, though not yet confirmed, that these mites pierce the beetle's wings with their stylets to feed on hemolymph.

It is unknown how the mites disperse from beetle to beetle. It may be that like other heterostigmatan mites, adult females are the dispersants. They may be sexually transmitted, dispersing from beetle to beetle during mating.

== Species ==
- Dytiscacarus americanus Mortazavi and Hajiqanbar, 2018 – US. Host Hydaticus bimarginatus
- Dytiscacarus iranicus Mortazavi and Hajiqanbar, 2018 – Iran. Host Hydaticus pictus
- Dytiscacarus thermonecti Mortazavi and Hajiqanbar, 2018 – US. Host Thermonectus basillaris
