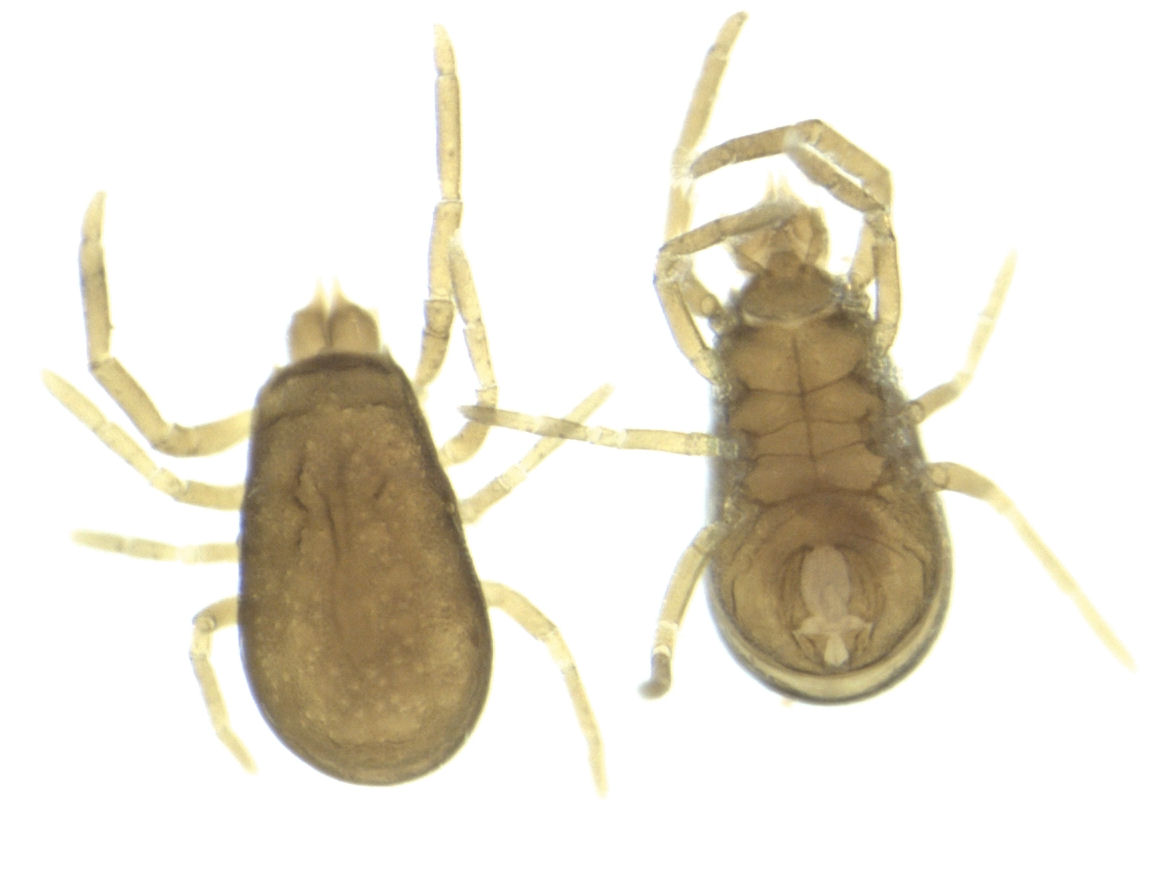
- extremely common and small species of Labidostomma

Scientific classification
- Domain: Eukaryota
- Kingdom: Animalia
- Phylum: Arthropoda
- Subphylum: Chelicerata
- Class: Arachnida
- Order: Trombidiformes
- Family: Labidostommatidae
- Genus: Labidostomma; Kramer, 1879

= Labidostomma =

Genus of mites

Labidostomma is a genus of mites belonging to the family Labidostommatidae. The bodies of these mites are covered in a reticulated pattern.

== Species ==
Species include:

- Labidostomma absoloni
- Labidostomma aethiopica
- Labidostomma angolensis
- Labidostomma cornutum
- Labidostomma corsicum
- Labidostomma denticulatum
- Labidostomma fictiluteum
- Labidostomma fissurata
- Labidostomma franzi
- Labidostomma guadelupense
- Labidostomma hoegi
- Labidostomma integrum
- Labidostomma jaquemarti
- Labidostomma legendrei
- Labidostomma longipes
- Labidostomma luteoides
- Labidostomma luteum
- Labidostomma mirax
- Labidostomma motasi
- Labidostomma perciliata
- Labidostomma peruviana
- Labidostomma repetitor
- Labidostomma vialeae
- Labidostomma virescens
- Labidostomma zangherii
