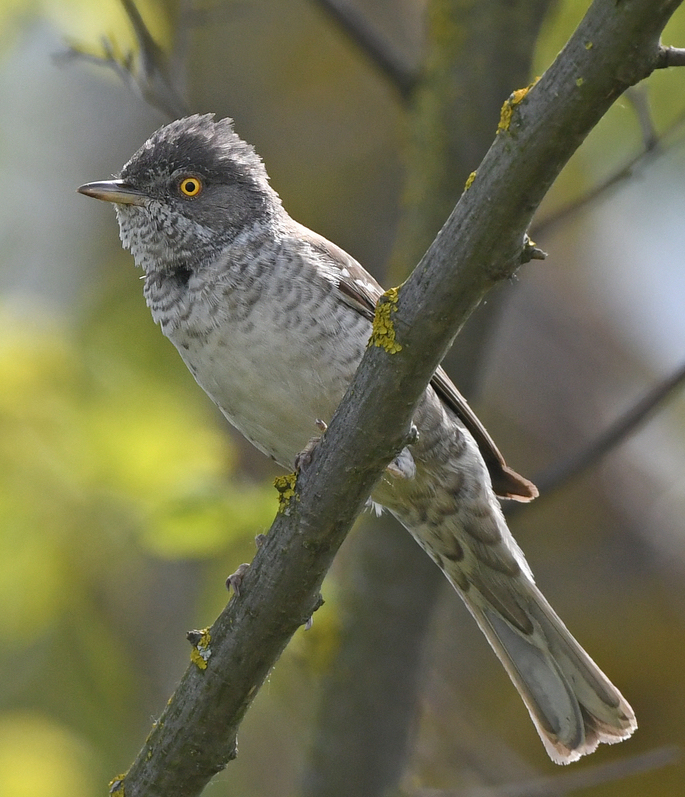
- in Austria

Conservation status
- Least Concern (IUCN 3.1)

Scientific classification
- Kingdom: Animalia
- Phylum: Chordata
- Class: Aves
- Order: Passeriformes
- Family: Sylviidae
- Genus: Curruca
- Species: C. nisoria

Binomial name
- Curruca nisoria (Bechstein, 1792)
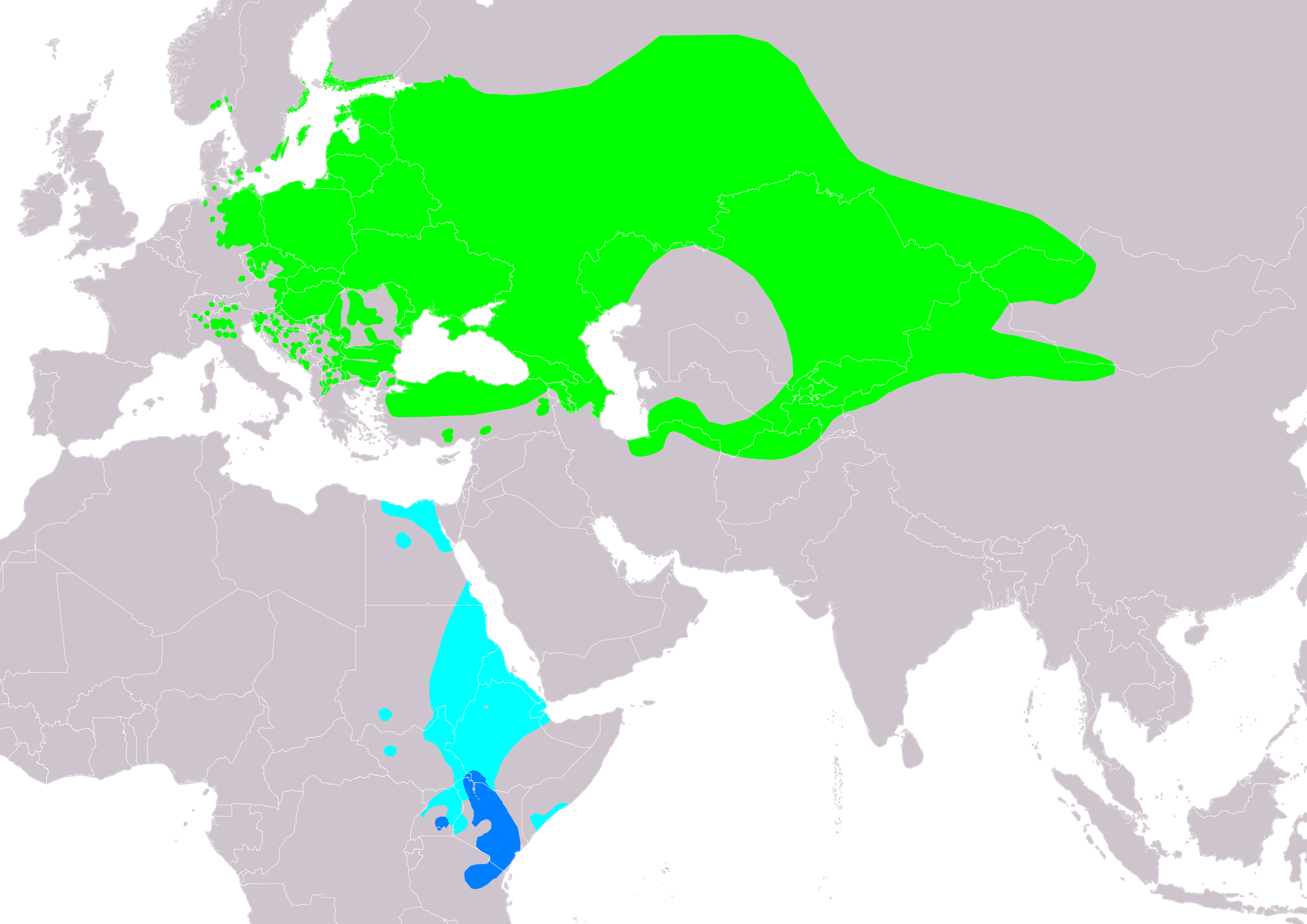
- Range of S. nisoria Breeding Passage Non-breeding

Synonyms
- Motacilla nisoria; Sylvia nisoria

= Barred warbler =

Species of bird

The barred warbler (Curruca nisoria) is a species of bird in the warbler family Sylviidae which breeds across temperate regions of central and eastern Europe and western and central Asia. This passerine bird is strongly migratory, and winters in tropical eastern Africa.

It is the largest Curruca warbler, 15.5–17 cm in length and weighing 22–36 g, mainly grey above and whitish below. Adult males are dark grey above with white tips on the wing coverts and tail feathers, and heavily barred below. The female is similar but slightly paler and has only light barring. Young birds are buffy grey-brown above, pale buff below, and have very little barring, with few obvious distinctive features; they can easily be confused with garden warblers, differing in the slight barring on the tail coverts and the pale fringes on the wing feathers, and their slightly larger size. The eye has a yellow iris in adults, dark in immatures; the bill is blackish with a paler base, and the legs stout, grey-brown.

== Taxonomy ==
Within the genus Curruca it is highly distinctive; the barred underside is shared only with the Cyprus warbler, which has black barring and an entirely different overall colour pattern. The barred warbler seems to represent an ancient lineage of Curruca warblers on its own and does not appear to have any particularly close relatives in the genus.

Two subspecies are recognised. The nominate Curruca nisoria nisoria occurs over most of the species' range, while Curruca nisoria merzbacheri occurs at eastern end of the range in central Asia. The latter is marginally paler and less heavily barred than the nominate subspecies, but they are barely distinct and intergrade where the ranges meet. Some authors consider them synonymous.

The specific nisoria is Medieval Latin for the Eurasian sparrowhawk, which is also barred.

== Ecology ==
The barred warbler is a bird of open country with bushes for nesting, with very similar habitat preferences to the red-backed shrike. The nest is built in low shrub or brambles, and three to seven eggs are laid. Like most warblers, it is mainly insectivorous, but also takes berries and other soft fruit extensively in late summer and autumn. Its song is a pleasant chattering like a garden warbler with many clear notes, but is harsher and less melodious, and slightly higher pitched, with some resemblance to the common whitethroat's song.

== Occurrence ==
The European population is estimated at around 460,000 pairs. It has declined in some areas, particularly at the western end of its breeding range in Denmark (where it is now extinct as a breeding bird), southern Finland and Germany, due to habitat loss from agricultural intensification and possibly other as yet unidentified causes; conversely, some increase has occurred in Ukraine, and further east numbers are currently stable. Population densities range between 1–20 pairs per 10 ha in Germany, up to 30 pairs per 10 ha recorded in Kazakhstan.

Barred warblers are regular on autumn passage as far west as Great Britain (typically 100-200 records annually), where it occurs mainly on the east coast between late August and late October, and more rarely to Ireland (around 10–20 records annually); spring passage records in Britain are very rare (1–3 per decade). The vast majority of British and Irish records are of first-year birds, with adults occurring only exceptionally rarely.

== Gallery ==
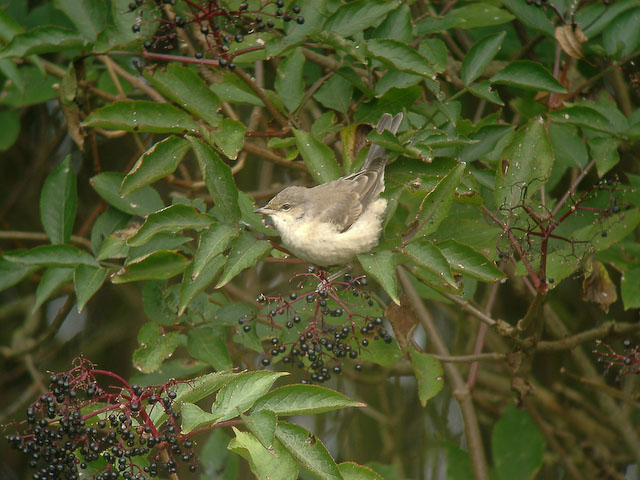
Immature barred warbler on migration, England

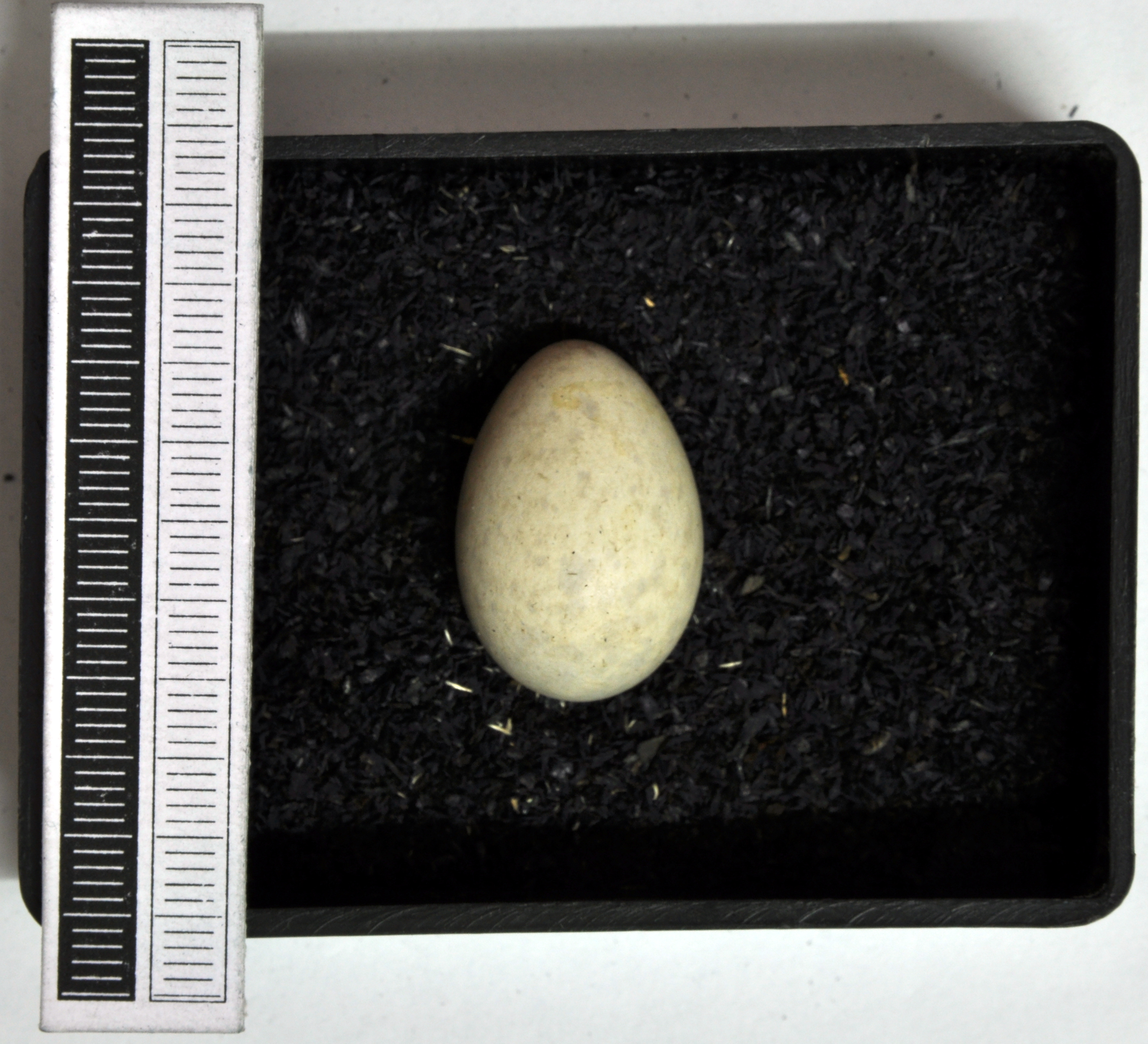
Egg, Collection Museum Wiesbaden, Germany

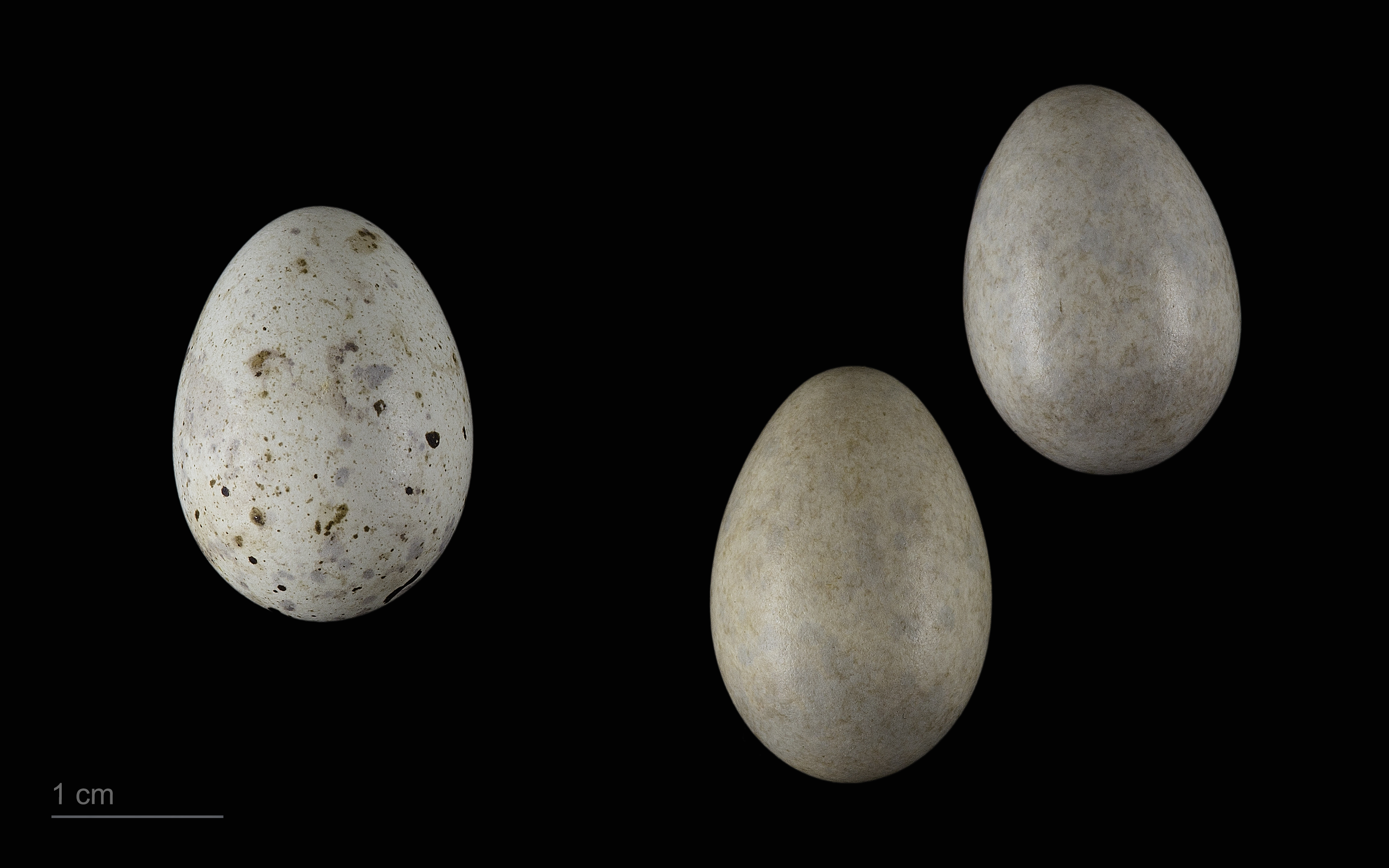
Cuculus canorus canorus (cuckoo) egg in a Sylvia nisoria clutch - MHNT

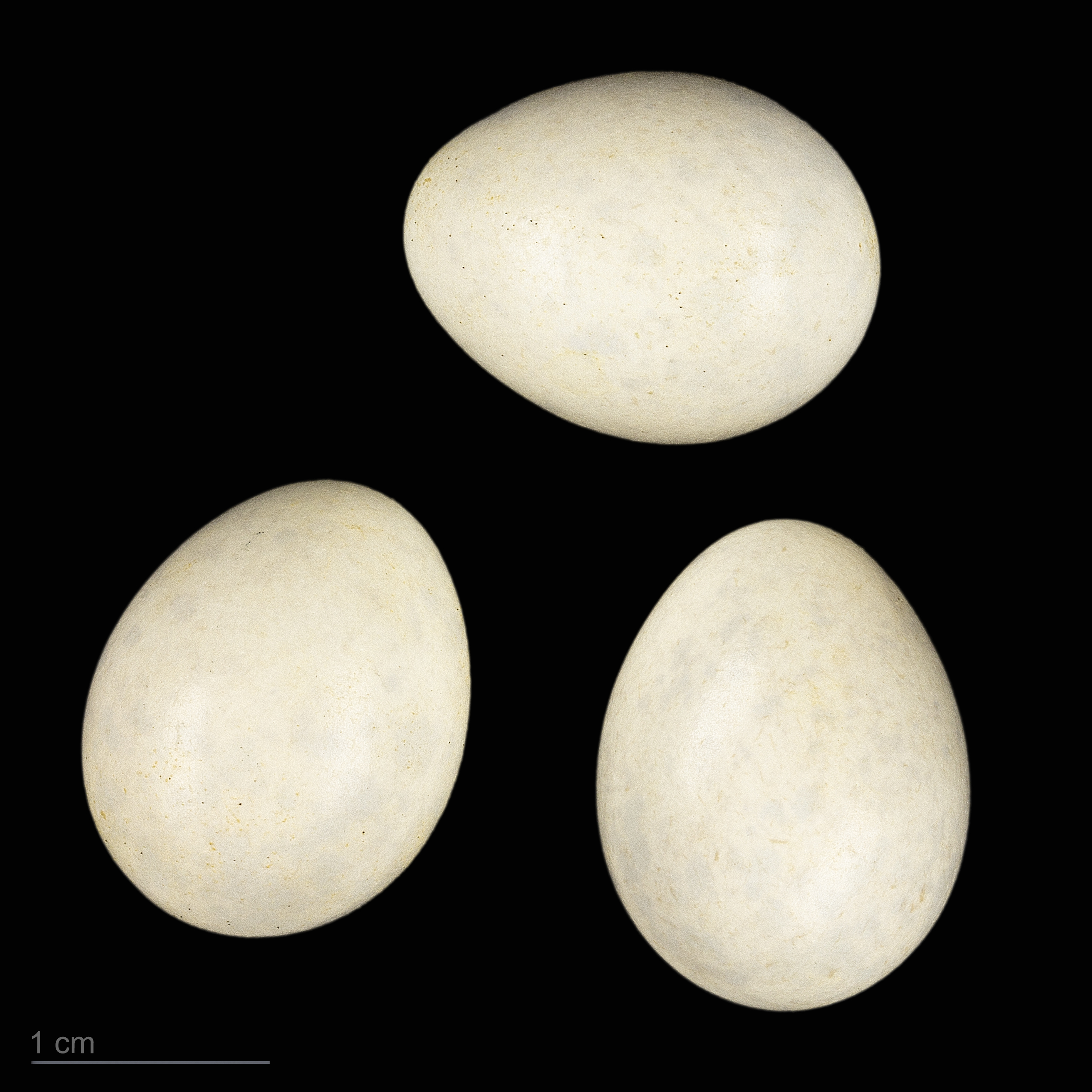
Curruca nisoria nisoria - MHNT
