= Syringophilopsis =

Scientific classification
- Kingdom: Animalia
- Phylum: Arthropoda
- Subphylum: Chelicerata
- Class: Arachnida
- Order: Trombidiformes
- Family: Syringophilidae
- Genus: Syringophilopsis; Kethley, 1970

Genus of birds

Syringophilopsis is a genus of mites that parasitize the feathers of passeriform birds.

== Description ==
The quill mites are from the family Syringophilidae. Although little is known about these parasitic mites, 33 species have been discovered, most prevalently in North America. They are all ectoparasites and they are usually found in birds from the order Passeriformes (comprising approximately 32 specific bird species). Their life cycle is simple since they are monoxenous organisms that sexually reproduce and eat within the feather of their hosts.

== Morphology ==
The genus Syringophilopsis is one of the most diverse of this family with over 33 identified species. Females have harpoon finger-like digits in their chelicerae, three teeth in their hypostomal apex which is ornamented by 1 or 2 protuberances. In males, the hysteronotal shield can be present, absent, free or fused. Both genders possess a propodontal shield and they are both relatively large in comparisons of other mites in the family Syringophilidae.

== Evolution ==
There is not a lot known about the diversification of quill mites. It is well studied that the specific host in which a parasite occupies directly influences the cospeciation between both organisms. Using RNA, Hendricks et al. determined that there is a degree a significant cophylogeny and cospeciation among Syringophilopsis species, however, it is not concrete. Statistically, what they specifically sought after in their analysis is the mitochondrial cytochrome oxidase I gene as well as nuclear ribosomal RNA gene.

== Transmission ==
These mites are host specific but each species has a specific niche affecting the passeriform bird in specific ways. For instance, depending on the species, these birds can transmit into the specific host via their primary, secondary, and tertiary feathers. Quill mites specifically attach to their designated host via stabbing of the calamus wall with their anatomical feature called chelicerae.

== Species ==
Species accepted by the Global Biodiversity Information Facility:

- Syringophilopsis acrocephali Skoracki, 1999
- Syringophilopsis albicollisi Skoracki & Dabert, 2000
- Syringophilopsis bartrami Skoracki, Spicer & OConnor, 2016
- Syringophilopsis blaszaki Skoracki & Dabert, 1999
- Syringophilopsis bochkovi Skoracki, Mironov & Bermúdez, 2019
- Syringophilopsis bonariensis Skoracki, Mironov, Hernandes & Valim, 2016
- Syringophilopsis borini Bochkov & Mironov, 1999
- Syringophilopsis catesbyi Skoracki, Spicer & OConnor, 2016
- Syringophilopsis certhiae Skoracki, Hendricks & Spicer, 2011
- Syringophilopsis corvinae Skoracki & Sikora, 2003
- Syringophilopsis davidi Glowska & Laniecka, 2012
- Syringophilopsis dendroicae B GSS, 2010
- Syringophilopsis dendroicae Bochkov & Galloway, 2001
- Syringophilopsis dicruri Skoracki, Hromada & Wamiti, 2011
- Syringophilopsis elongatus (Ewing, 1911)
- Syringophilopsis emberizae Fain, Bochkov & Mironov, 2000
- Syringophilopsis empidonax Skoracki, Flannery & Spicer, 2008
- Syringophilopsis faini Bochkov & Apanaskevich, 2001
- Syringophilopsis fringilla (Fritsch, 1958) Fritsch, 1958
- Syringophilopsis fringillae (Fritsch, 1958)
- Syringophilopsis garrulus Skoracki & Dabert, 2002
- Syringophilopsis hirundus Skoracki, 2004
- Syringophilopsis hunanensis Liu Bai-li, 1988
- Syringophilopsis icteri Bochkov & Galloway, 2001
- Syringophilopsis idunae Skoracki, 2011
- Syringophilopsis kazmierski Skoracki, 2004
- Syringophilopsis kirgizorum Bochkov, Mironov & Kravtsova, 2000
- Syringophilopsis kristini Skoracki, Tryjanowski & Hromada, 2002
- Syringophilopsis lagonostictus Skoracki & Dabert, 2002
- Syringophilopsis melittophagi Skoracki & Dabert, 2001
- Syringophilopsis mimidus Sikora, Fajfer & Skoracki, 2012
- Syringophilopsis muscicapus Skoracki, 2011
- Syringophilopsis nitens Skoracki & Dabert, 2001
- Syringophilopsis nucifragus Skoracki, 2011
- Syringophilopsis pari Skoracki & Mironov, 2013
- Syringophilopsis passericus Skoracki, 2011
- Syringophilopsis passerina
- Syringophilopsis passerinae (Clark, 1964)
- Syringophilopsis philemonis Glowska & Laniecka, 2013
- Syringophilopsis polioptilus Skoracki, Flannery & Spicer, 2008
- Syringophilopsis rusticus Skoracki, 2004
- Syringophilopsis sialiae Skoracki, Flannery & Spicer, 2008
- Syringophilopsis sittae Skoracki, Hendricks & Spicer, 2011
- Syringophilopsis spinolettus Skoracki, 2004
- Syringophilopsis sturnellus Skoracki, Hendricks & Spicer, 2011
- Syringophilopsis sturni Chirov & Kravtsova, 1995
- Syringophilopsis szeffleri Glowska, 2014
- Syringophilopsis trogoni Skoracki, Mironov & Unsoeld, 2013
- Syringophilopsis turdi (Fritsch, 1958)
- Syringophilopsis turdus (Fritsch, 1958) Fritsch, 1958
- Syringophilopsis tyranni Bochkov & Galloway, 2004
- Syringophilopsis tyrrani B GSS, 2010
- Syringophilopsis veselovsky Skoracki, Antczak & Riegert, 2009
- Syringophilopsis wilsoni Skoracki, Spicer & OConnor, 2016
- Syringophilopsis yosefi Skoracki, Tryjanowski & Hromada, 2002
