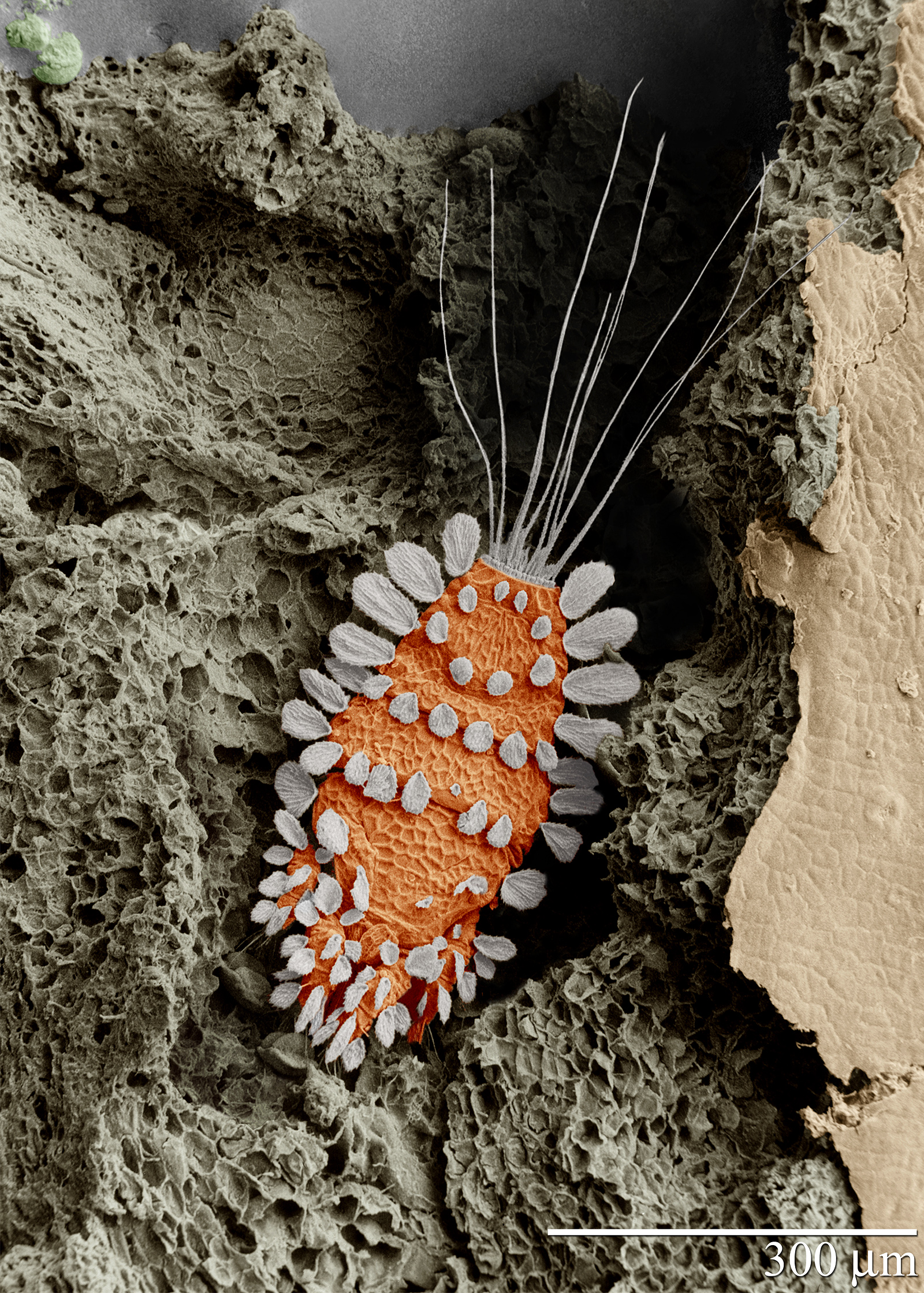
- False-colour scanning electron micrograph of Tuckerella sp., magnified 260 times

Scientific classification
- Kingdom: Animalia
- Phylum: Arthropoda
- Subphylum: Chelicerata
- Class: Arachnida
- Order: Trombidiformes
- Superfamily: Tetranychoidea
- Family: Tuckerellidae; Baker & Pritchard, 1953
- Genus: Tuckerella; Womersley, 1940

= Tuckerella =

Tuckerella Temporal range: Palaeogene–present

Genus of mites

The peacock mites of the genus Tuckerella (the only genus of the mite family Tuckerellidae) are a significant herbivorous pest in the tropics, for example on citrus fruit. Other species dwell in grasses, possibly as root feeders.

The peacock mite's name suggests that their feather-like (or leaf-like) setae adorning their backs are evocative of a peacock's plumage. They also have long hair-like setae projecting from rear (caudal setae) that have been compared to a trailing peacock tail. The 5–7 pairs of caudal setae can be flicked over the body very quickly, and they are used like whips as a defense mechanism against predators. They may also help in wind-borne dispersal.

They are classified in the superfamily Tetranychoidea, being its most ornate members.

== Species ==
- Tuckerella anommata Smith-Meyer & Ueckermann, 1997 (South Africa)
- Tuckerella channabasavannai Mallik & Kumar, 1992 (host: Saraca indica; Andhra Pradesh)
- Tuckerella eloisae Servin & Otero, 1989 (host: Fouquieria diguetii; Mexico)
- Tuckerella filipina Corpuz-Raros, 2001 (host: Hydnocarpus sp.: Philippines)
- Tuckerella hainanensis Lin & Fu, 1997 (host: Coffea arabica; Hainan)
- Tuckerella jianfengensis Lin & Fu, 1997 (host: Annona muricata; Jianfengling, Hainan)
- Tuckerella kumaonensis Gupta, 1979 (India)
- Tuckerella litoralis Collyer, 1969
- Tuckerella nilotica Zaher & Rasmy, 1970 (Egypt)
- Tuckerella ornatus (Tucker, 1926) – type species
- Tuckerella xiamenensis Lin, 1982 (host: Manilkara zapota)
- Tuckerella xinglongensis Lin-Yanmou & Fu-Yuegua, 1997 (hosts: Polyscias fruticosa var. plumata and Camellia sinensis; Hainan)
- †Tuckerella fossilibus Khaustov, Sergeyenko & Perkovsky 2014 (Rovno amber)
- †Tuckerella weiterschani Sidorchuk & Khaustov, 2018 (Baltic amber)
