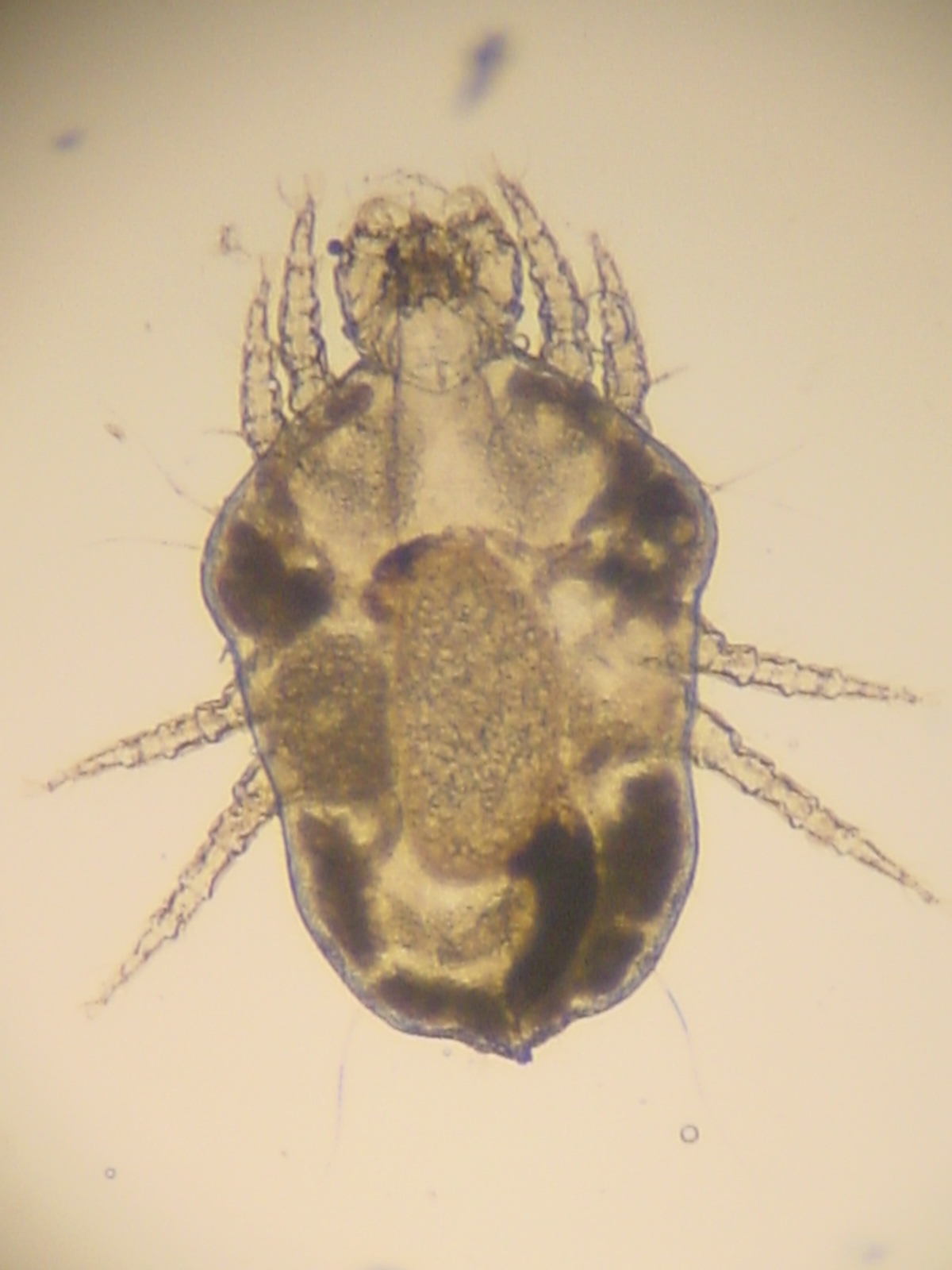

Scientific classification
- Domain: Eukaryota
- Kingdom: Animalia
- Phylum: Arthropoda
- Subphylum: Chelicerata
- Class: Arachnida
- Order: Trombidiformes
- (unranked): Eleutherengonides
- Superfamily: Cheyletoidea; Leach, 1815

Families
- Cheyletidae; Cloacaridae; Demodecidae; Harpyrhynchidae; Myobiidae; Ophioptidae; Psorergatidae; Syringophilidae

= Cheyletoidea =

Cheyletoidea Temporal range: Cretaceous–present

Superfamily of mites

Cheyletoidea is a superfamily of mites in the order Trombidiformes. They include parasites of other arthropods and vertebrates, though some Cheyletidae are instead free-living predators.
