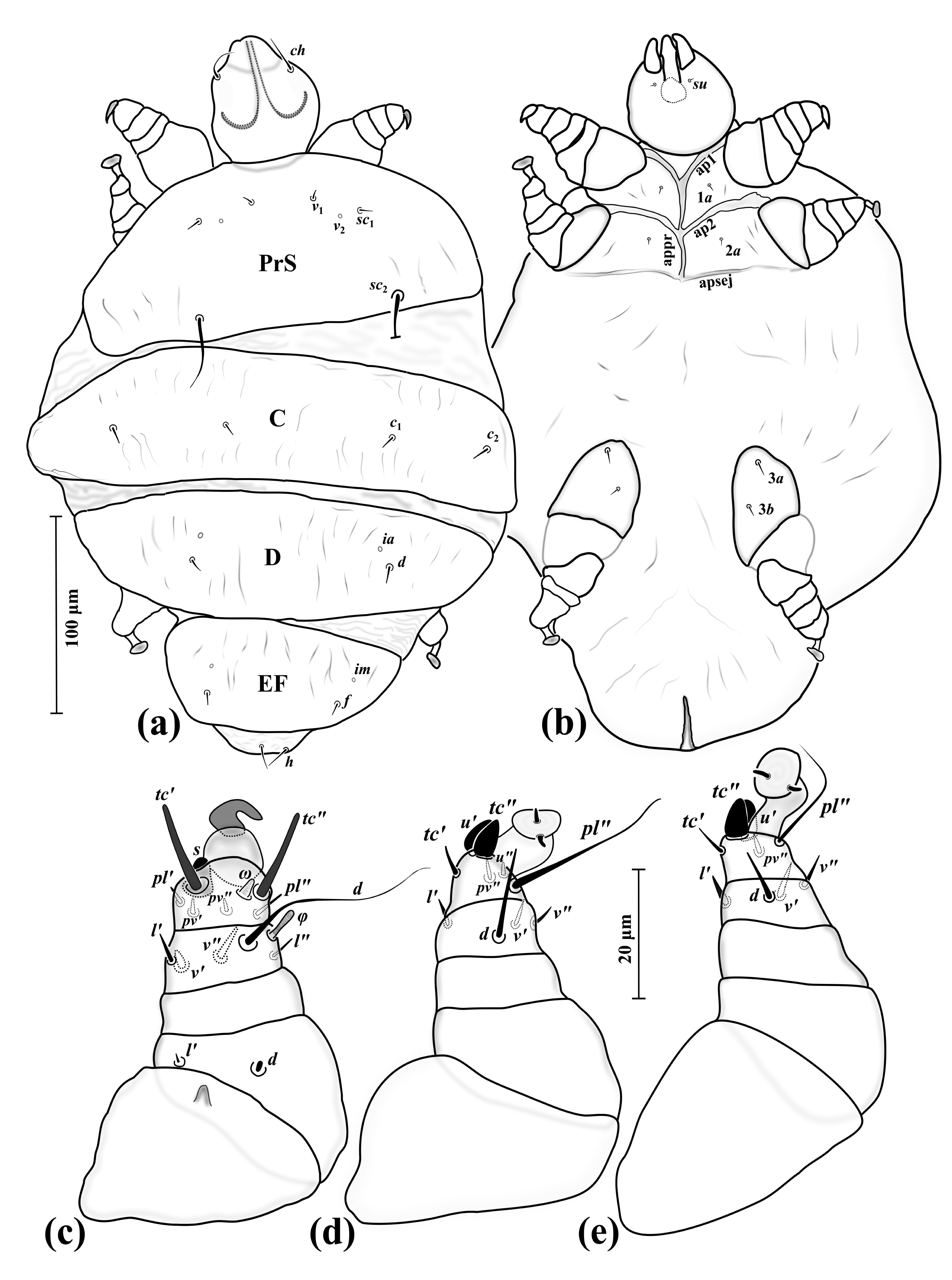
- Eutarsopolipus paryavae

Scientific classification
- Domain: Eukaryota
- Kingdom: Animalia
- Phylum: Arthropoda
- Subphylum: Chelicerata
- Class: Arachnida
- Order: Trombidiformes
- (unranked): Eleutherengonides
- (unranked): Heterostigmatina

Superfamilies
- Tarsocheyloidea; Heterocheyloidea; Dolichocyboidea; Trochometridioidea; Scutacaroidea; Pygmephoroidea; Pyemotoidea; Tarsonemoidea

= Heterostigmatina =

Heterostigmatina Temporal range: Cretaceous–present

Group of mites

Heterostigmatina is a grouping of mites.
