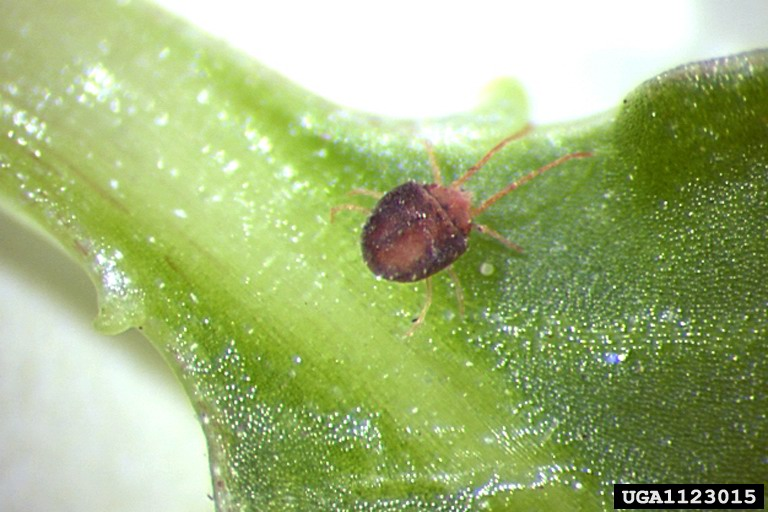
- Spider mite, Bryobia praetiosa (Tetranychidae)

Scientific classification
- Kingdom: Animalia
- Phylum: Arthropoda
- Subphylum: Chelicerata
- Class: Arachnida
- Order: Trombidiformes
- Suborder: Prostigmata
- Infraorder: Eleutherengona
- Superfamily: Tetranychoidea; Donnadieu, 1876

= Tetranychoidea =

Tetranychoidea Temporal range: Palaeogene–present

Superfamily of mites

Tetranychoidea is a superfamily of mites in the order Trombidiformes. There are about 5 families and more than 2,200 described species in Tetranychoidea.

== Description ==
Mites of this family have the cheliceral bases fused into a structure called a stylophore, which can be moved independently of the subcapitulum and can be retracted into the prodorsum. The movable digits of the chelicerae resemble stylets, being greatly elongated, and their bases are strongly recurved within the stylophore. There is a pair of well-developed peritremes embedded anteriorly on the prodorsum, ending in protuberant enlargements. The true claws of the legs possess tenent hairs. Males possess aedeagi which are used to directly transfer sperm to females.

The individual families can be recognised as follows:

- Allochaetophoridae have only 3 pairs of setae on the prodorsum, instead of 4 pairs as in other families.
- Linotetranidae lack eyes. Also, they are usually colourless and slender in shape.
- Tenuipalpidae lack a palptibial claw complex, a feature present in most other tetranychoids. Also, the body is often flattened and may have well-developed plates.
- Tetranychidae have eyes, 4 pairs of setae on the prodorsum, and a palptibial complex. Its two subfamilies differ in the structure of the empodium, which has tenent hairs in Bryobiinae and lacks them in Tetranychinae.
- Tuckerellidae have most dorsal setae expanded and leaf-like. The posterior margin of the body has a row of flagelliform setae.

== Ecology ==
Tetranychoidea are herbivores. Some species of Tetranychidae, Tenuipalpidae and Tuckerellidae are pests of agricultural and ornamental plants.

== Families ==
These five families belong to the superfamily Tetranychoidea:

- Allochaetophoridae
- Linotetranidae
- Tenuipalpidae
- Tetranychidae (spider mites)
- Tuckerellidae

== Gallery ==
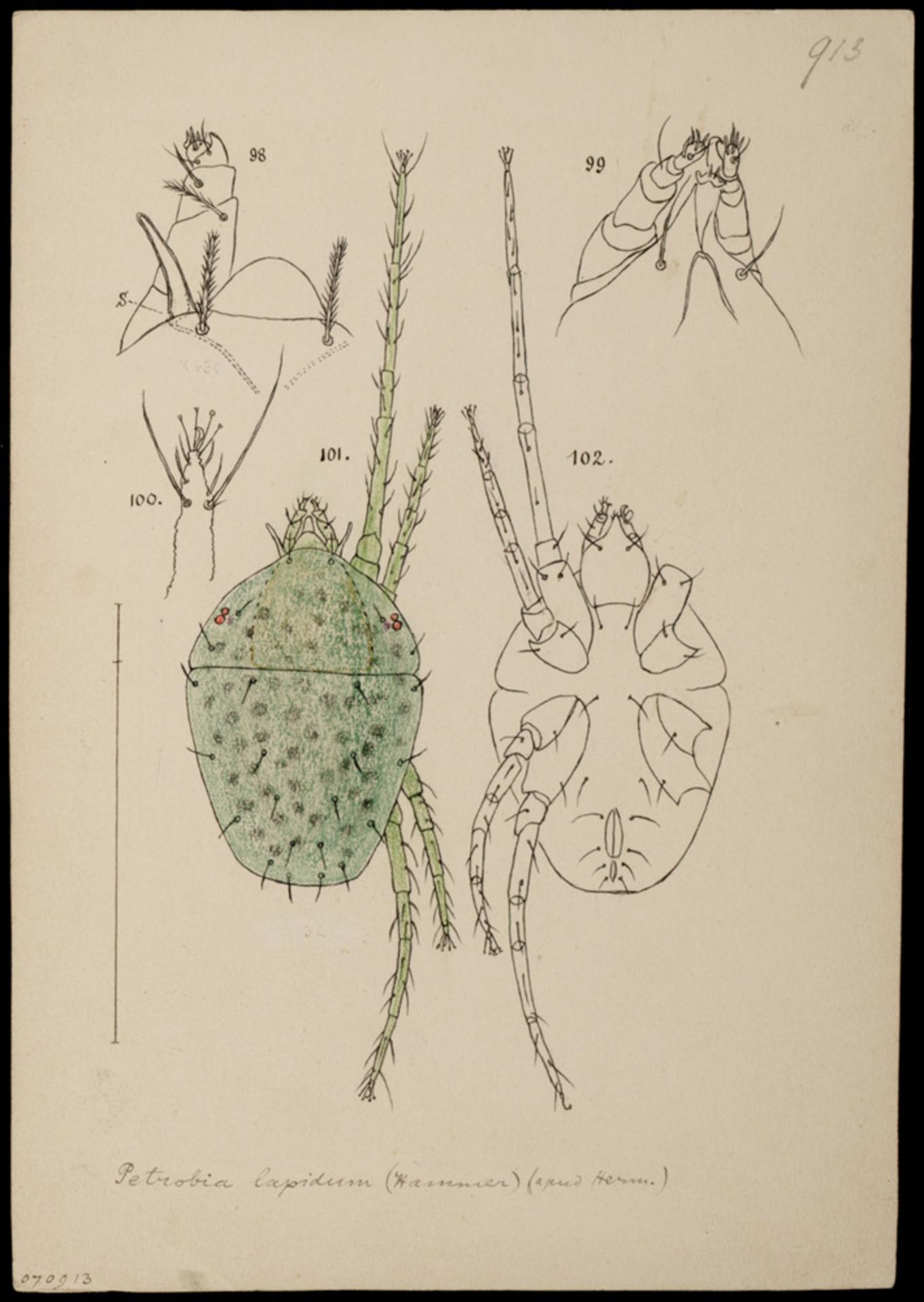
Petrobia (Tetranychidae)

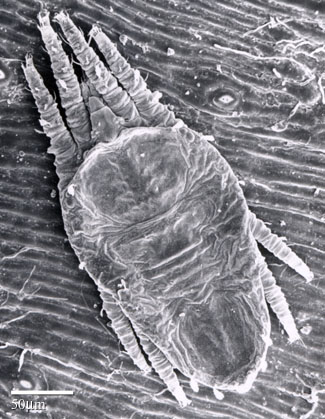
Brevipalpus phoenicis (Tenuipalpidae)

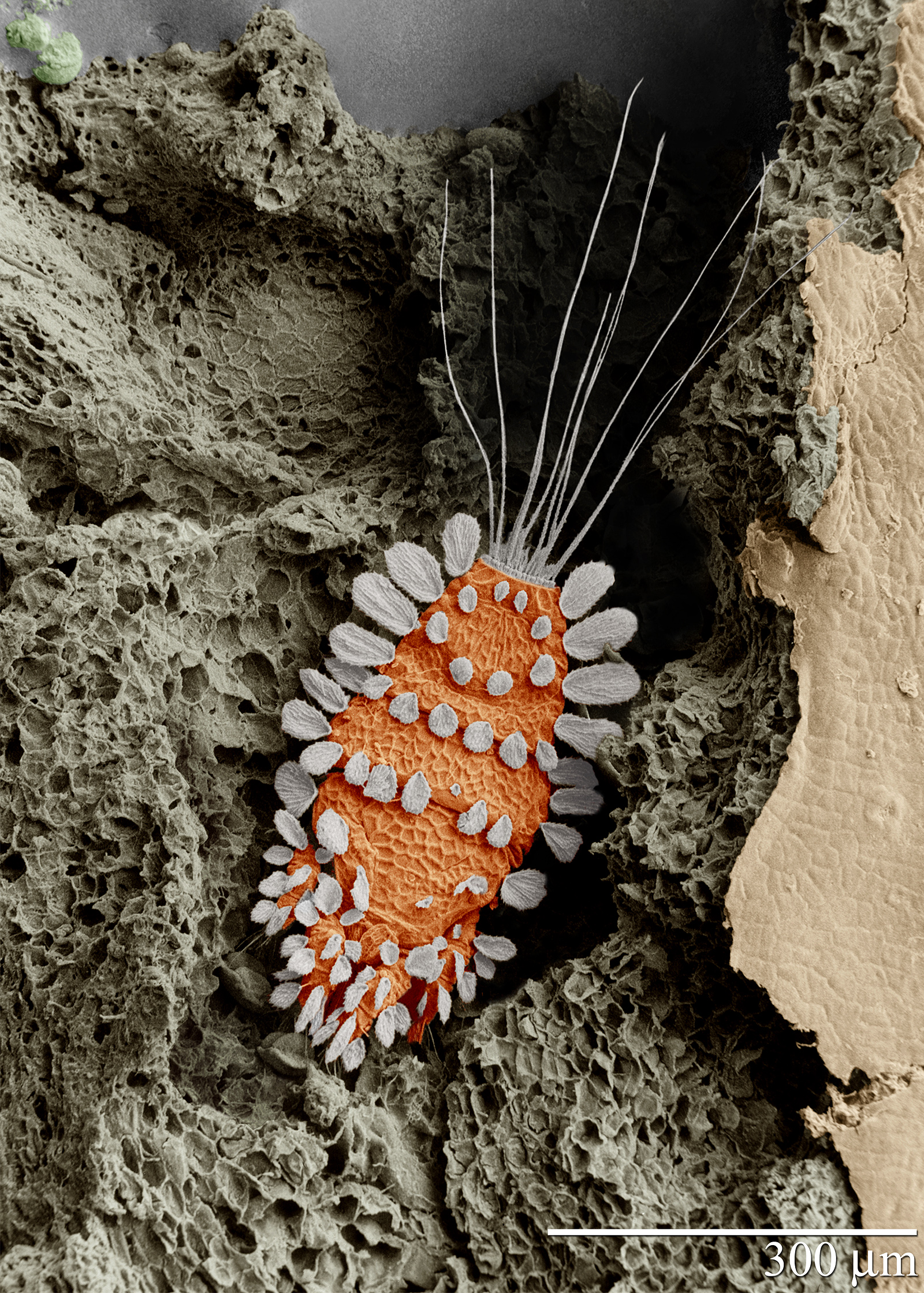
Tuckerella sp. (Tuckerellidae)
