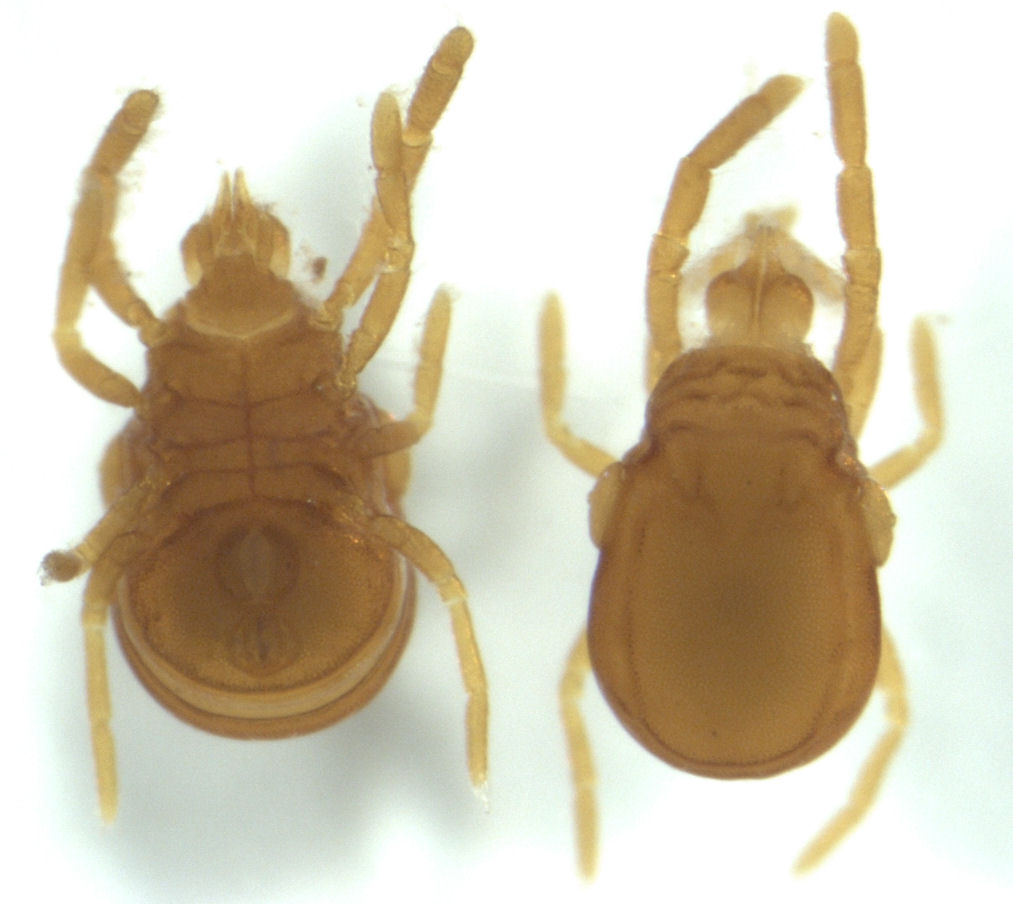
- Adult Labidostommatidae

Scientific classification
- Kingdom: Animalia
- Phylum: Arthropoda
- Subphylum: Chelicerata
- Class: Arachnida
- Order: Trombidiformes
- Suborder: Prostigmata
- Infraorder: Labidostommatina
- Superfamily: Labidostommatoidea; Oudemans, 1904
- Family: Labidostommatidae; Oudemans, 1906

= Labidostommatidae =

Family of mites

Labidostommatidae is a family of acariform mites. These egg-shaped free-living predators have the body completely covered with sclerotized plates, often with a reticulated pattern, two or three eyes and two claws on each tarsus.

== Genera ==
BioLib includes:

- Cornutella?
- Eunicolina Berlese, 1911
- Labidostomma Kramer, 1879
