= Camerobiidae =

Camerobiidae Temporal range: Palaeogene–present

Scientific classification
- Kingdom: Animalia
- Phylum: Arthropoda
- Subphylum: Chelicerata
- Class: Arachnida
- Order: Trombidiformes
- Superfamily: Raphignathoidea
- Family: Camerobiidae; Southcott, 1957

Genera
- Acamerobia; Bisetulobius; Camerobia; Decaphyllobius; Neophyllobius; Tillandsobius; Tycherobius

Family of mites

Camerobiidae is a family of mites.
