= Cornutella (mite) =

Scientific classification
- Kingdom: Animalia
- Phylum: Arthropoda
- Subphylum: Chelicerata
- Class: Arachnida
- Order: Trombidiformes
- Family: Labidostommatidae
- Genus: Cornutella; Feider & Vasiliu, 1969

Species
- Cornutella ezoensis; Cornutella multisetosa

Genus of mites

Cornutella is a genus of acari in the family Labidostommatidae.
