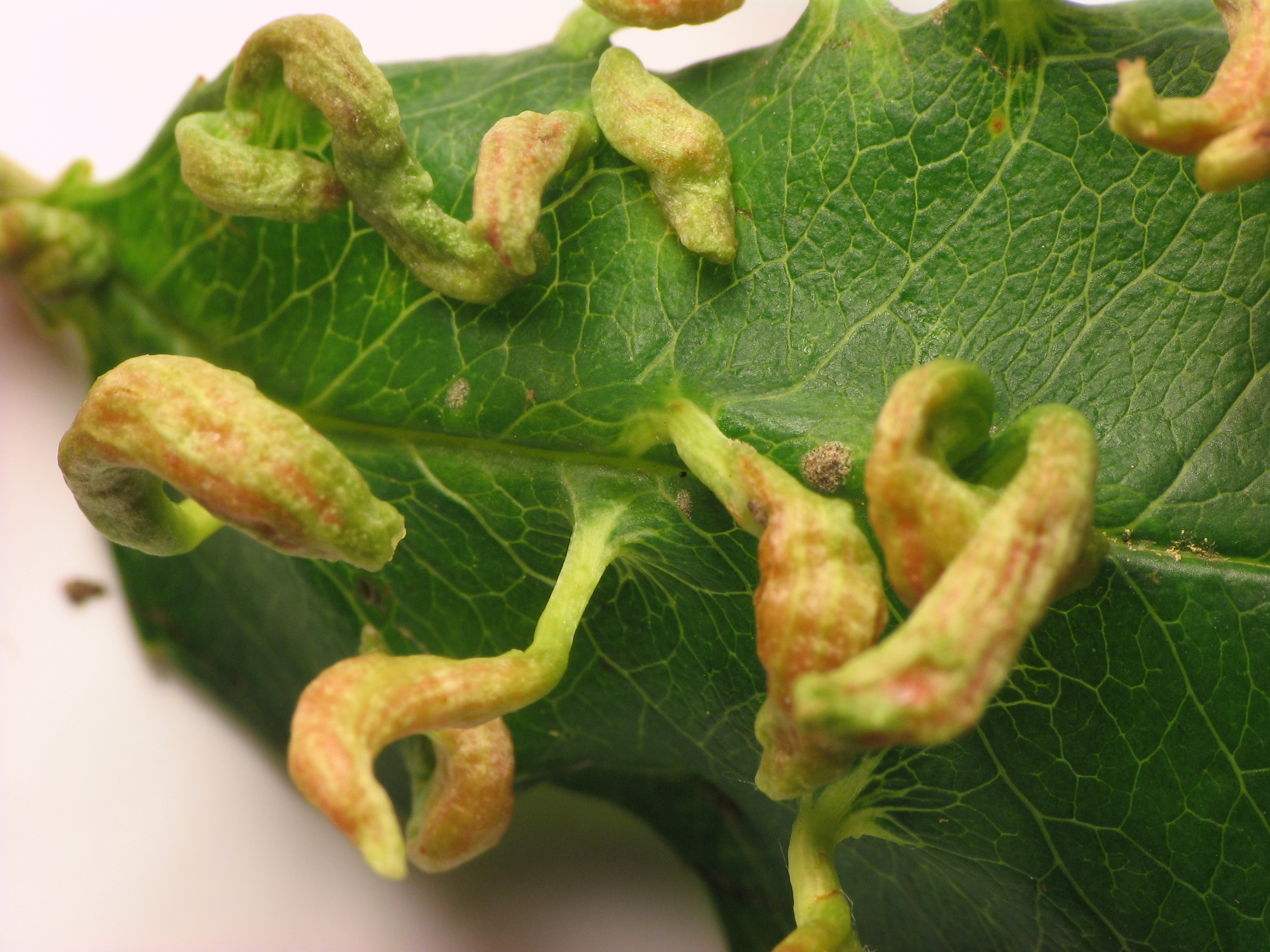
- Eriophyes cerasicrumena (family Eriophyidae), galls on cherry

Scientific classification
- Kingdom: Animalia
- Phylum: Arthropoda
- Subphylum: Chelicerata
- Class: Arachnida
- Order: Trombidiformes
- Suborder: Prostigmata

Infraorders
- Anystina; Eleutherengona; Eupodina; Labidostommatina

= Prostigmata =

Prostigmata Temporal range: Devonian–present

Suborder of mites

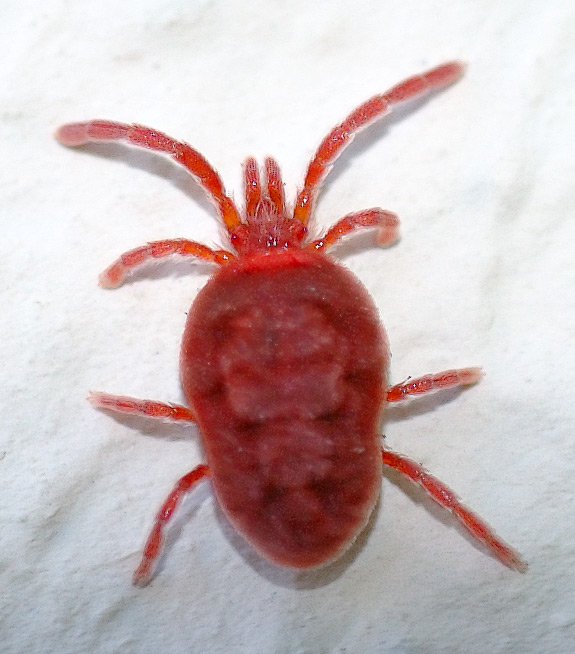
Trombidium holosericeum (family Trombidiidae)

Prostigmata is a suborder of mites belonging to the order Trombidiformes, which contains the "sucking" members of the "true mites" (Acariformes).

Many species are notorious pests on plants. Well-known examples of prostigmatan plant parasites are species of the gall mites (Eriophyidae, e.g. the redberry mite Acalitus essigi), Tarsonemidae (e.g. the cyclamen mite, Steneotarsonemus pallidus), and the spider mites of the Tetranychidae (e.g. the two-spotted spider mite, Tetranychus urticae).

Other Prostigmata live as parasites on vertebrates (e.g. Demodex mites of the Demodecidae) or invertebrates (e.g. Polydiscia deuterosminthurus of the Tanaupodidae or the honeybee tracheal mite, Acarapis woodi, of the Tarsonemidae). There are also some forms (e.g. Smarididae) that are predators of small invertebrates – including smaller Prostigmata – yet others have a more varied lifestyle (e.g. Tydeidae) or switch their food sources as they mature (e.g. Erythraeidae). The suborder also includes the family Halacaridae (marine mites).

Some of the Prostigmata parasitizing vertebrates are of medical relevance due to causing skin diseases in humans. These include for example harvest mites ("chiggers") of the Trombiculidae.

== Description ==
Prostigmata are usually 0.1–2 mm long, though some giant red velvet mites can reach 16 mm. They have a range of different body forms and colours. As mites, most of them have eight legs (six in their larval stage). However, the Eriophyoidea instead have four legs, all positioned at the front of a long, worm-like body. The name "Prostigmata" comes from mites of this group having spiracles (stigmata) on the prodorsum, usually between the chelicerae or on its lateral margins.

== Habitat ==
Many prostigmatans live in soil. These occur in soils as varied as agricultural fields, burned prairies, tidal marshlands, drained lake beds with algal blooms, and Antarctic soils.

Other prostigmatans are aquatic. The group includes Hydrachnidia, commonly known as the water mites. Hydrachnidia live in many kinds of freshwater habitats, including lentic (e.g. lakes, ponds), lotic (e.g. rivers, streams), springs and interstitial waters. Also in the Prostigmata are family Halacaridae, which are mostly marine.

Other habitats of Prostigmata include caves, algae, mosses, lichens, shrubs and trees.

== Diet ==
Prostigmata have a wide range of diets, including species that are predators, herbivores, fungivores, microbivores and parasites.

Among the soil-dwelling Prostigmata, the smaller predatory species have nematodes as an important part of their diet. They may also feed occasionally on fungi, piercing fungal hyphae using stylet chelicerae. Larger predatory species, such as members of Bdelloidea and Trombidoidea, feed on other arthropods or their eggs.

== Systematics and taxonomy ==
The Prostigmata make up the bulk of the acariform clade Trombidiformes, which also contains the minor and quite ancient lineage Sphaerolichida. The trombidiform mites are possibly the most promising approach to untangle the systematics, taxonomy and phylogeny of the notoriously complex Acariformes. Trombidiformes and the other acariform clade, Sarcoptiformes, were formerly considered suborders but this does not allow for a sufficiently precise classification of the mites and is adjusted in more modern treatments.

They contain a few of the little-known "Endeostigmata" – apparently an assemblage of several specialized but only distantly related lineages – which for the most part appear to be Sarcoptiformes. In addition, the Trombidiformes include the bulk of the presumed group of mites called "Actinedida". This taxon is still commonly encountered in systematic treatments. However, modern cladistic studies time and again fail to find any monophyletic group corresponding to the "Actinedida". Thus, they appear to be an evolutionary grade rather than an evolutionary lineage, united not by their apomorphies but by the lack of such characters that have evolved after the Acariformes separated from the Parasitiformes. Thus, the "Actinedida" seem to be a massively paraphyletic "wastebin taxon", uniting all Acariformes that are not "typical" Oribatida and Astigmata.

The Prostigmata present their own taxonomic and systematic problems even in the redefined monophyletic delimitation. They are variously subdivided into the Anystina and Eleutherengona, and Eupodina. The delimitation and interrelationships of these groups are entirely unclear; while most analyses find one of the latter two but not the other to be a subgroup of the Anystina, neither of these mutually contradicting hypotheses is very robust; possibly this is a simple error because phylogenetic software usually fails in handling non-dichotomous phylogenies. Consequently it may be best for the time being to consider each of the three main prostigmatan lineages to be equally distinct from the other two, not including either Eleutherengona or Eupodina in the Anystina in accord with the traditional view – the suborder Anystina are here considered the largest possible clade containing the Anystidae but no taxon assigned to the other two suborders.

=== Currently accepted taxonomy ===
As of May 2022, Catalogue of Life and Integrated Taxonomic Information System accept the following taxonomy for Prostigmata, including four infraorders:

==== Anystina ====
- Superfamily Adamystoidea
- Superfamily Allotanaupodoidea
- Superfamily Amphotrombioidea
- Superfamily Anystoidea
- Superfamily Arrenuroidea
- Superfamily Caeculoidea
- Superfamily Calyptostomatoidea
- Superfamily Chyzerioidea
- Superfamily Erythraeoidea
- Superfamily Eylaoidea
- Superfamily Hydrachnoidea
- Superfamily Hydrovolzioidea
- Superfamily Hydryphantoidea
- Superfamily Hygrobatoidea
- Superfamily Lebertioidea
- Superfamily Paratydeoidea
- Superfamily Pomerantzioidea
- Superfamily Stygothrombioidea
- Superfamily Tanaupodoidea
- Superfamily Trombiculoidea
- Superfamily Trombidioidea
- Superfamily Yurebilloidea

==== Eleutherengona ====
(Also known as Eleutherengonides)

- Superfamily Cheyletoidea
- Superfamily Cloacaroidea
- Superfamily Dolichocyboidea
- Superfamily Heterocheyloidea
- Superfamily Myobioidea
- Superfamily Pterygosomatoidea
- Superfamily Pyemotoidea
- Superfamily Raphignathoidea
- Superfamily Scutacaroidea
- Superfamily Tarsocheyloidea
- Superfamily Tarsonemoidea
- Superfamily Tetranychoidea
- Superfamily Trochometridioidea

==== Eupodina ====
- Superfamily Bdelloidea
- Superfamily Eriophyoidea
- Superfamily Eupodoidea
- Superfamily Halacaroidea
- Superfamily Tydeoidea

==== Labidostommatina ====
- Superfamily Labidostommatoidea: monotypic family Labidostommatidae
