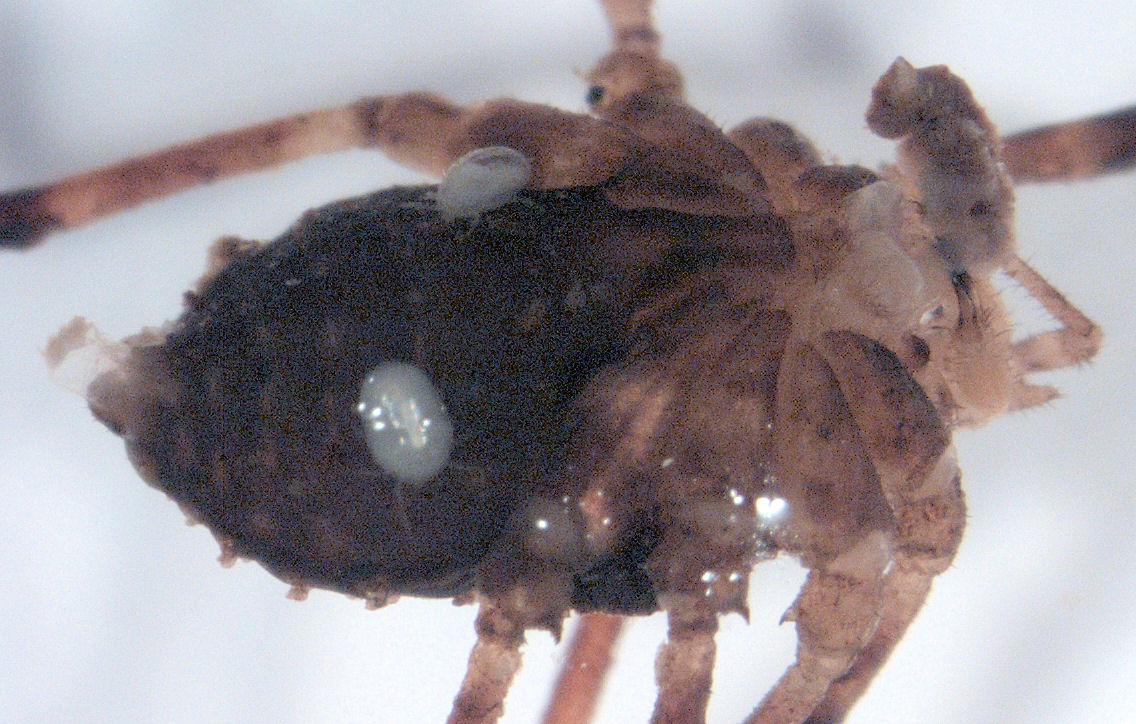
- Parasitengona larvae on a specimen of Monoscutum (Opiliones)

Scientific classification
- Kingdom: Animalia
- Phylum: Arthropoda
- Subphylum: Chelicerata
- Class: Arachnida
- Order: Actinedida
- Suborder: Parasitengona; Oudemans, 1909

= Parasitengona =

Parasitengona Temporal range: Cretaceous–present

Group of mites

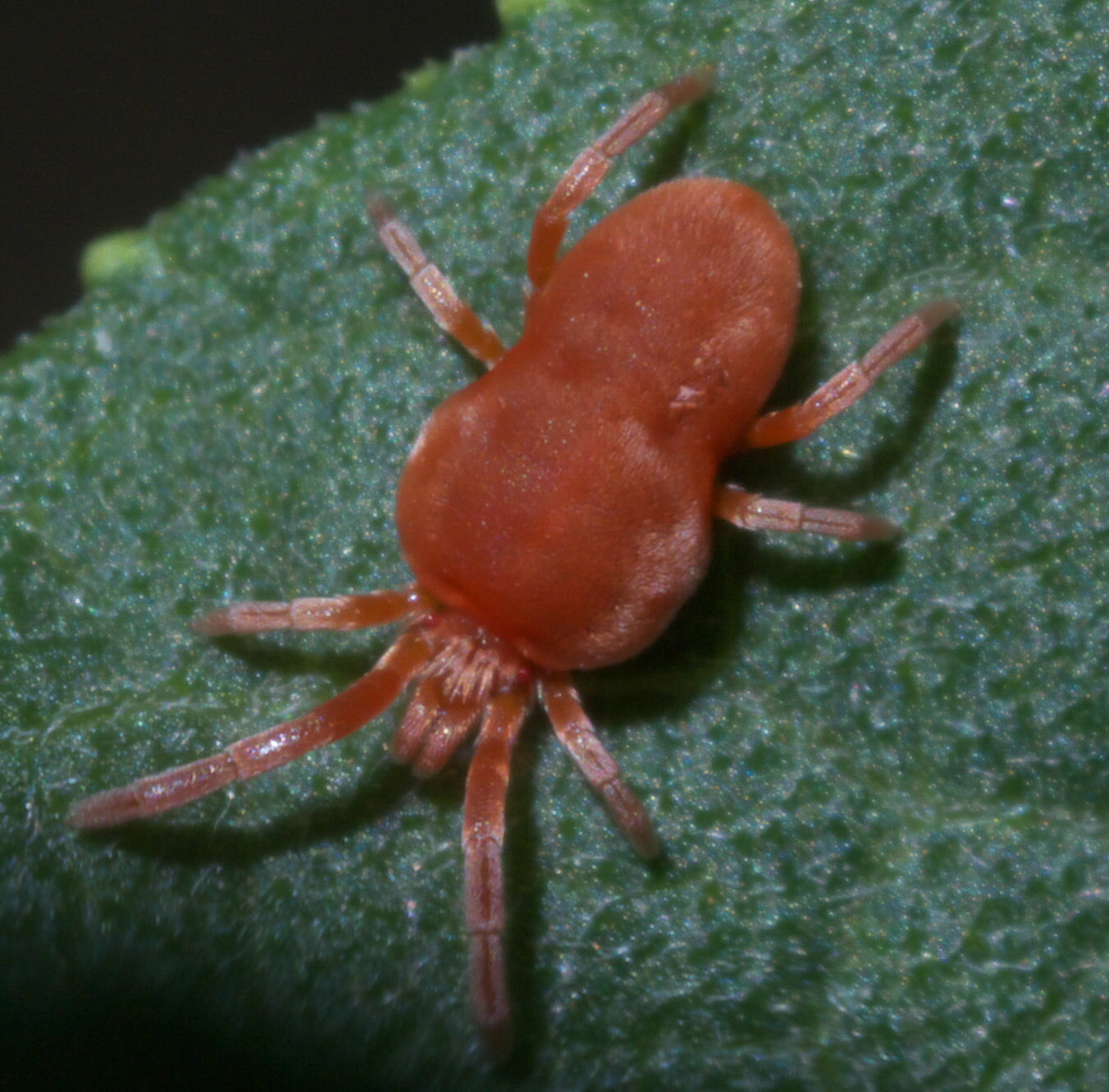
Allothrombium (Trombidiidae: Trombidioidea)

Parasitengona is a group of mites, variously ranked as a hyporder or a cohort, between the taxonomic ranks of order and family.

They are divided into the aquatic Hydrachnidia (water mites) and the terrestrial Trombidia. The latter includes velvet mites and chiggers.

== Description ==
Many Parasitengona are relatively large (for mite standards) and have a bright red colouration. Other colours include purple, orange, yellow, blue, green and brown. The terrestrial Trombidia are often hypertrichous, meaning they are covered in many irregularly arranged setae. The chelicerae bases are separate, the fixed cheliceral digit is absent and the movable digit is either hooked or linear. The palps are often raptorial with a claw-like seta on the tibia. The gnathosoma is retractable within group Erythraeina. The stigmata and peritremes, when present, are between the cheliceral bases. In Trombidia, there is usually one or two pairs of trichobothria on the prodorsum, and these are often mounted on a linear sclerotised plate (crista metopica). There are almost always well-developed eye lenses. Genital papillae are usually present but vary in their size and number.

Eggs of Trombidia are usually reddish, but those within superfamily Erythraeoidea are brown-black due to a lipid-protein cover. Eggs of Hydrachnidia have a gelatinous sheath.

== Life cycle and reproduction ==
The life cycle of Parasitengona consists of the egg, prelarva, larva, protonymph (also known as the nymphochrysalis), deutonymph, tritonymph (imagochrysalis) and adult. The larva, deutoynmph and adult stages are active, while the remaining stages are inactive.

The deutonymph is usually the primary growth stage. However, larvae of species of Trombidium and Eutrombidium (Trombidia) and Eylais and Hydrachna (Hydrachnidia) can grow additional cuticle without moulting (neosomy), so these species grow most in the larval stage.

Almost all parasitengones have two distinct sexes (dioecious). Males transfer sperm to females indirectly via stalked spermatophores. Female lay eggs usually in one to three clutches.

== Ecology ==
The Hydrachnidia, as previously noted, are aquatic. Among the terrestrial Trombidia, the Trombidioidea prefer woodlands while the Erythraeoidea prefer open landscapes. Additionally, most Trombidioidea are edaphic (living on and within the soil) while Erythraeoidea live in the litter layer, under stones or on vegetation.

Larvae of Parasitengona are usually ectoparasites of arthropods, and they make up most of the red mites that can be found attached to arthropods. Some (e.g. chiggers) use vertebrates as hosts instead. There are also species with free-living larvae.

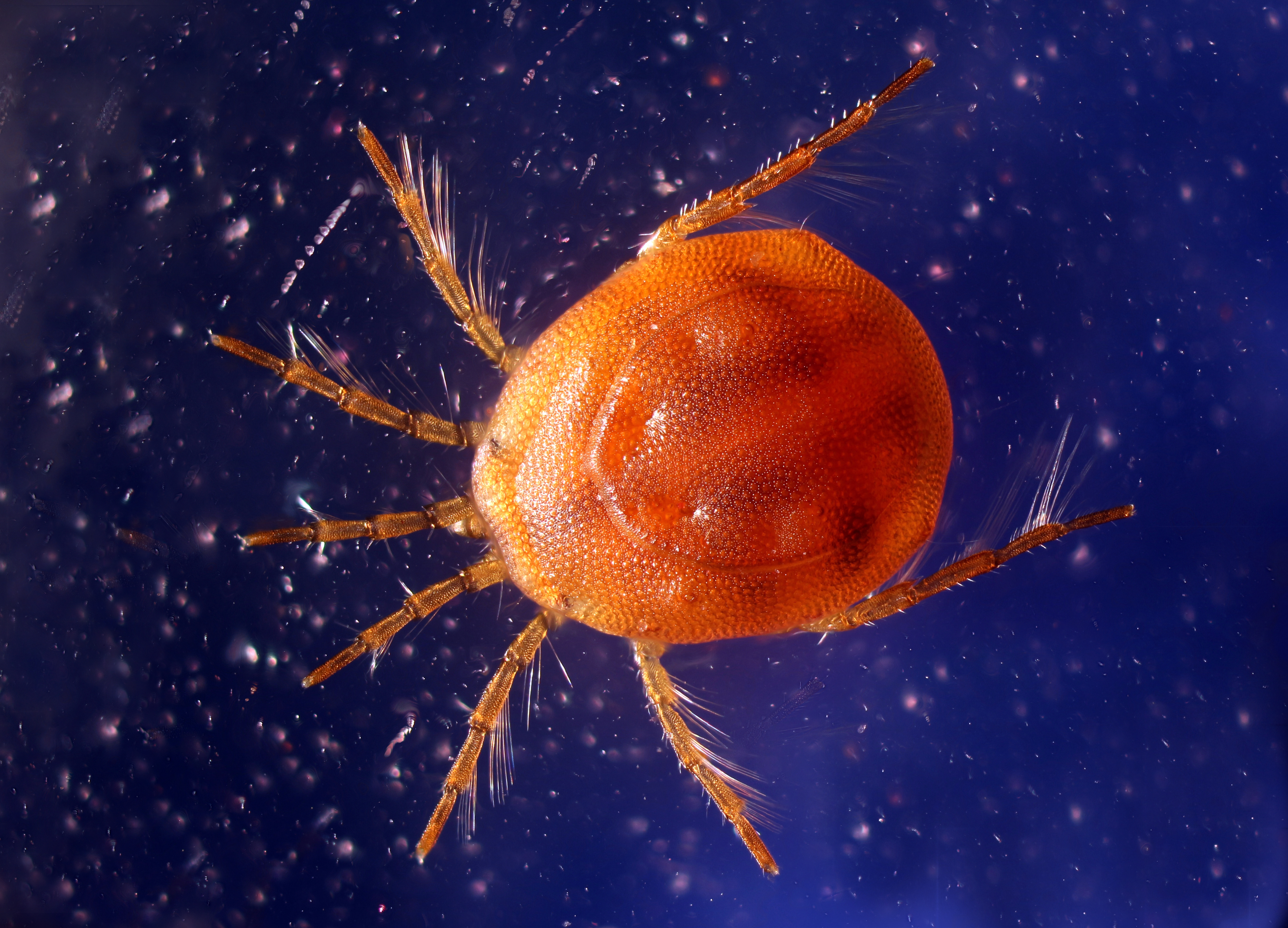
Water mite (Hydrachnidia)

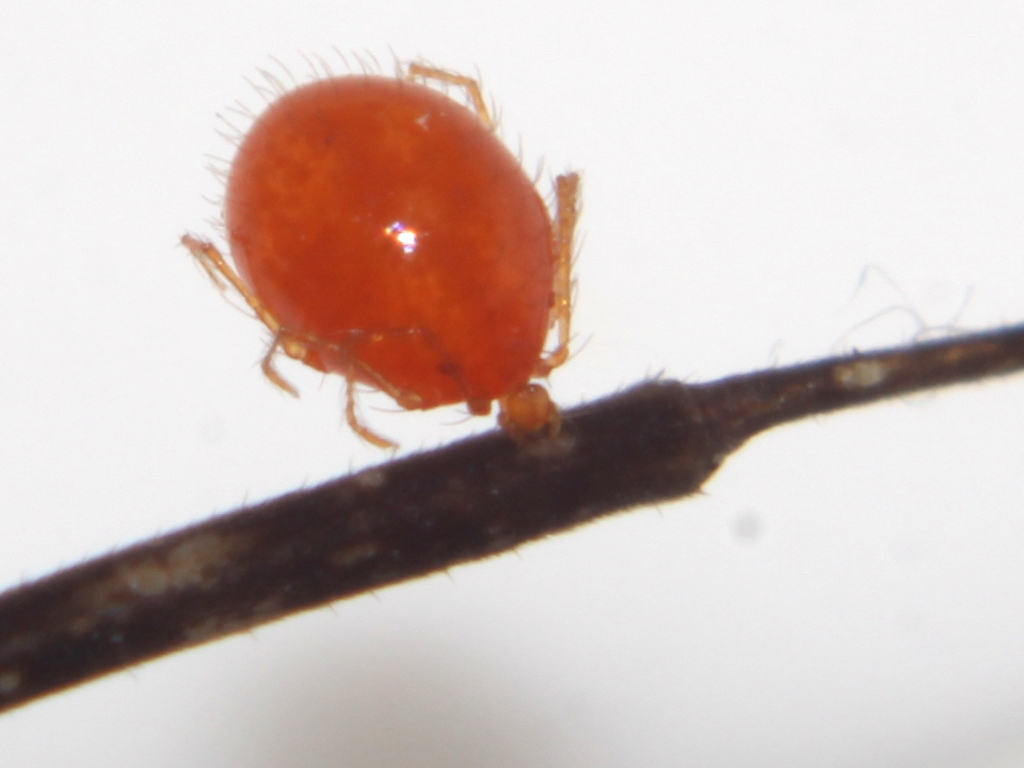
Erythraeidae (Erythraeoidea) larva attached to Opiliones leg

Some examples are larval Neotrombidium beeri, which live beneath elytra of false mealworm beetles, and larval Arrenurus, which parasitise Odonata. Twenty-one species across six families are myrmecophilous, meaning they are associated with ants. Non-biting midges (Chironomidae) are the most common host for water mites, while crane flies (Tipulidae) are hosts for both water mites and Trombidia. Larvae of some erythraeid species are also known to hyperparasitise conspecific larvae; if an unfed larva encounters a larva that has recently fed, it will attach to the fed larva and feed on it.

Deutonymphs and adults are usually predators on other arthropods, especially immobile life stages such as eggs and pupae. Again, some species have other diets, such as species of Balaustium that feed on pollen or on the sap of plants.

== Phylogeny ==
According to a molecular phylogenetic analysis using the genes 18S, 28S and COI, Hydrachnidia (water mites) is nested within Trombidia (terrestrial parasitengone mites) and the sister group to Calyptostomatoidea, Stygothrombioidea is the sister group to all other Parasitengona, Erythraeoidea and Tanaupodoidea are sister groups, and Trombiculoidea is a paraphyletic clade along with Chyzerioidea in relation to Trombidioidea.

== Taxonomy ==
As of 2011, the taxonomic composition of Parasitengona was as follows:

- Superfamily Calyptostomatoidea Oudemans, 1923
  - Family Calyptostomatidae Oudemans, 1923
- Superfamily Erythraeoidea Robineau-Desvoidy, 1828
  - Family Erythraeidae Robineau-Desvoidy, 1828
  - Family Smarididae Kramer, 1878
  - Family †Proterythraeidae Vercammen-Grandjean, 1973
- Superfamily Amphotrombioidea Zhang, 1998
  - Family Amphotrombiidae Zhang, 1998
- Superfamily Allotanaupodoidea Zhang & Fan, 2007
  - Family Allotanaupodidae Zhang & Fan, 2007
- Superfamily Chyzerioidea Womersley, 1954
  - Family Chyzeriidae Womersley, 1954
- Superfamily Tanaupodoidea Thor, 1935
  - Family Tanaupodidae Thor, 1935
- Superfamily Trombiculoidea Ewing, 1929
  - Family Johnstonianidae Thor, 1935
  - Family Neotrombidiidae Feider, 1959
  - Family Trombellidae Leach, 1815
  - Family Leeuwenhoekiidae Womersley, 1944
  - Family Trombiculidae Ewing, 1929
  - Family Walchiidae Ewing, 1946
  - Family Audyanidae Southcott, 1987
- Superfamily Trombidioidea Leach, 1815
  - Family Achaemenothrombiidae Saboori, Wohltmann & Hakimitabar, 2010
  - Family Neothrombiidae Feider, 1959
  - Family Microtrombidiidae Thor, 1935
  - Family Trombidiidae Leach, 1815
- Superfamily Yurebilloidea Southcott, 1996
  - Family Yurebillidae Southcott, 1996
- Superfamily Hydryphantoidea Piersig, 1896
  - Family Hydryphantidae Piersig, 1896
  - Family Hydrodromidae Viets, 1936
  - Family Rhynchohydracaridae Lundblad, 1936
  - Family Teratothyadidae Viets, 1929
  - Family Ctenothyadidae Lundblad, 1936
  - Family Thermacaridae Sokolow, 1927
  - Family Zelandothyadidae Cook, 1983
  - Family Malgasacaridae Tuzovskij, Gerecke & Goldschmidt 2007
- Superfamily Eylaoidea Leach, 1815
  - Family Eylaidae Leach, 1815
  - Family Limnocharidae Grube, 1859
  - Family Piersigiidae Oudemans, 1902
  - Family Apheviderulicidae Gerecke, Smith & Cook, 1999
- Superfamily Hydrovolzioidea Thor, 1905
  - Family Hydrovolziidae Thor, 1905
  - Family Acherontacaridae Cook, 1967
- Superfamily Hydrachnoidea Leach, 1815
  - Family Hydrachnidae Leach, 1815
- Superfamily Lebertioidea
  - Family Bandakiopsidae Panesar, 2004
  - Family Stygotoniidae Cook, 1992
  - Family Sperchontidae Thor, 1900
  - Family Rutripalpidae Sokolow, 1934
  - Family Teutonidae Koenike, 1910
  - Family Anisitsiellidae Koenike, 1910
  - Family Lebertiidae Thor, 1900
  - Family Acucapitidae Wiles, 1996
  - Family Oxidae Viets, 1926
  - Family Torrenticolidae Piersig, 1902
- Superfamily Hygrobatoidea Koch, 1842
  - Family Pontarachnidae Koenike, 1910
  - Family Limnesiidae Thor, 1900
  - Family Omartacaridae Cook, 1963
  - Family Wettinidae Cook, 1956
  - Family Frontipodopsidae Viets, 1931
  - Family Ferradasiidae Cook, 1980
  - Family Lethaxonidae Cook, Smith & Harvey, 2000
  - Family Hygrobatidae Koch, 1842
  - Family Aturidae Thor, 1900
  - Family Feltriidae Viets, 1926
  - Family Unionicolidae Oudemans, 1909
  - Family Pionidae Thor, 1900
  - Family Astacocrotonidae Thor, 1927
- Superfamily Arrenuroidea Thor, 1900
  - Family Momoniidae Viets, 1926
  - Family Nudomideopsidae Smith, 1990
  - Family Mideopsidae Koenike, 1910
  - Family Athienemanniidae Viets, 1922
  - Family Chappuisididae Motas & Tanasachi, 1946
  - Family Gretacaridae Viets, 1978
  - Family Neoacaridae Motas & Tanasachi, 1947
  - Family Mideidae Thor, 1911
  - Family Acalyptonotidae Walter, 1911
  - Family Kantacaridae Imamura, 1959
  - Family Nipponacaridae Imamura, 1959
  - Family Harpagopalpidae Viets, 1924
  - Family Arenohydracaridae Cook, 1974
  - Family Amoenacaridae Smith & Cook, 1997
  - Family Laversiidae Cook, 1955
  - Family Krendowskiidae Viets, 1926
  - Family Arrenuridae Thor, 1900
  - Family Bogatiidae Motas & Tanasachi, 1948
  - Family Hungarohydracaridae Motas & Tanasachi, 1959
  - Family Uchidastygacaridae Imamura, 1956
- Superfamily Stygothrombidioidea Thor, 1935 (1 family)
  - Family Stygothrombiidae Thor, 1935
