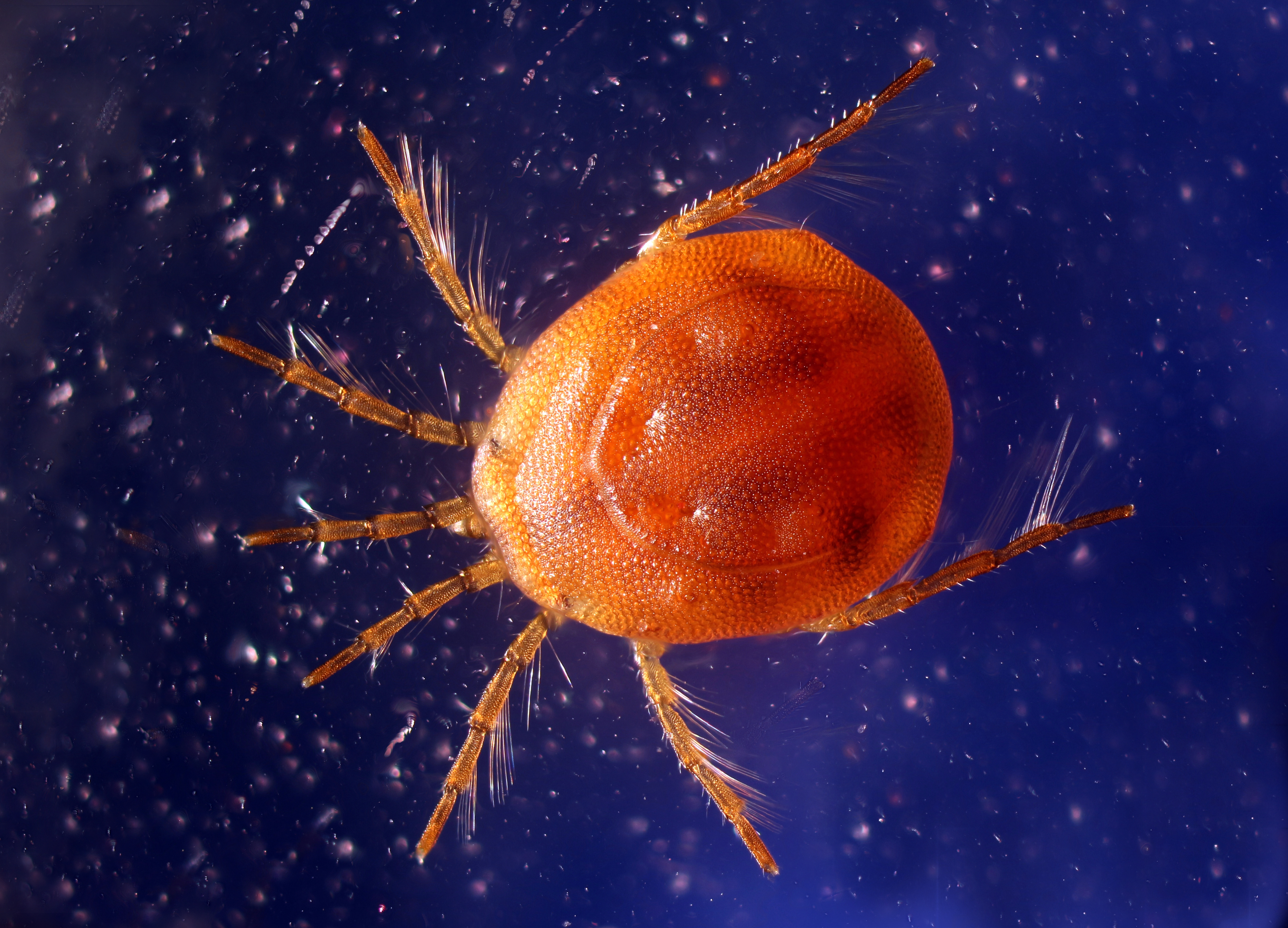
- Water mite 1.1 mm long from a freshwater pond

Scientific classification
- Kingdom: Animalia
- Phylum: Arthropoda
- Class: Arachnida
- Subclass: Acari
- Order: Trombidiformes
- Suborder: Prostigmata
- (unranked): Parasitengona
- (unranked): Hydrachnidia

Superfamilies
- Arrenuroidea; Eylaoidea; Hydrachnoidea; Hygrobatoidea; Hydrovolzioidea; Hydryphantoidea; Lebertioidea; Stygothrombidioidea

Synonyms
- Hydracarina; Hydrachnellae

= Hydrachnidia =

Hydrachnidia Temporal range: Wordian–Recent

Group of mites

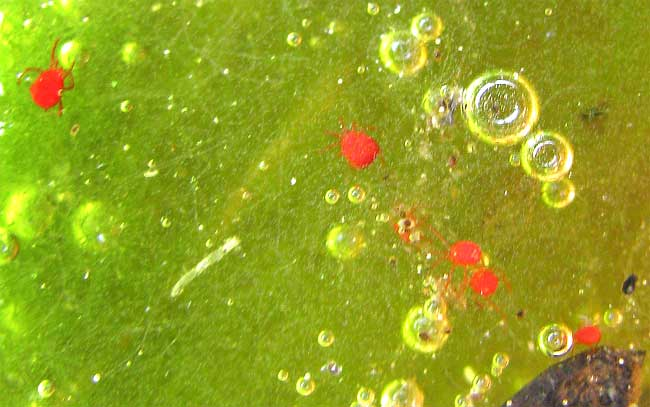
Water mites in a mat of floating algae

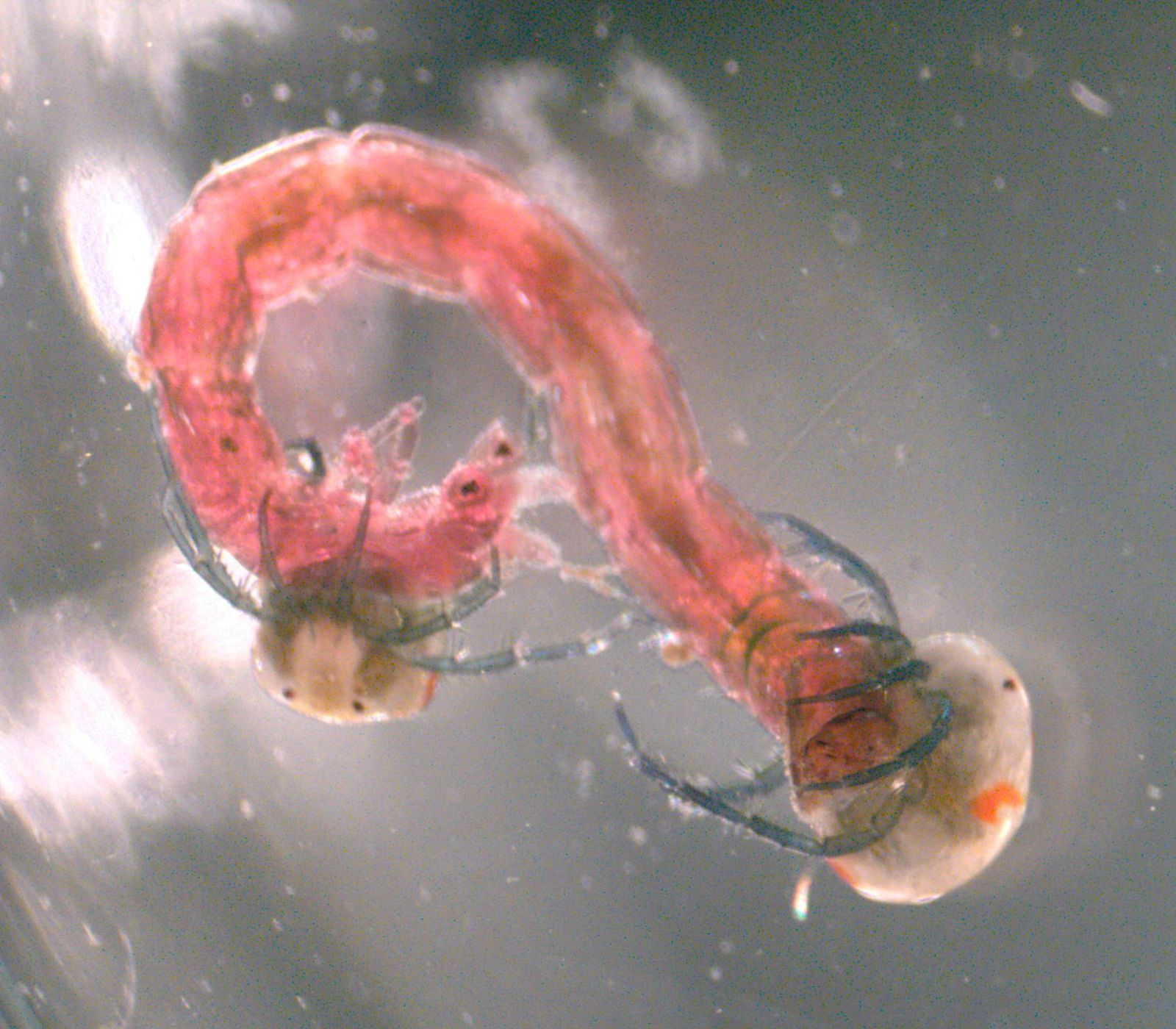
Two water mites feeding on the larva of a chironomid

Hydrachnidia, also known as "water mites", Hydrachnidiae, Hydracarina or Hydrachnellae, are among the most abundant and diverse groups of benthic arthropods, composed of 6,000 described species from 57 families. As water mites of Africa, Asia, and South America have not been well-studied, the numbers are likely to be far greater. Other taxa of parasitengone mites include species with semi-aquatic habits, but only the Hydracarina are properly subaquatic. Water mites follow the general Parasitengona life cycle: active larva, inactive (calyptostasic) protonymph, active deutonymph, inactive tritonymph and active adult. Usually, larvae are parasites, while deutonymphs and adults are predators.

== Description ==
Water mites may be brilliant red or orange in colour, unusual among freshwater invertebrates, but they also display more subtle blues, greens and yellows. They are also unusual among mites in some lineages having movable, internalized eye lenses sunk deep within the prosoma rather than being set on the surface of the cuticle.

The group has two synapomorphies, features inherited from a common ancestor. In larvae, the genu of the palp has two setae. In post-larval stages, there are complex dermal structures consisting of a gland paired with a sensory seta (glandularia), possibly for defense against predators.

The palps of post-larval water mites vary depending on their diet. The egg-eating Hydryphantidae, Hydrodromidae, and Hydrachnidae have chelate (pincer-like) palps. The crustacean-eating Arrenurus (Arrenuridae) have uncate palps to grasp the slim appendages of crustaceans. Most other water mite families have linear palps for grappling with prey animals.

== Habitat ==
Hydrachnidia are ubiquitous in nearly all freshwater habitats of every continent except Antarctica. Typical habitats include streams and marshes, but they may also be found in more obscure areas such as treeholes, hot springs, deep lakes and waterfalls. Some species have also adapted to marine environments.

== Parasitism ==
=== Background ===
Larvae are usually the only water mite life stage to have parasitic relationships with other organisms. Upon location of a host, larvae pierce host integument with their chelicerae and feed on hemolymph until fully engorged or brushed off. Common host groups include insects with aquatic or semi-aquatic juvenile stages, including, but not limited to, the Diptera (true flies), Odonata (dragonflies and damselflies), and Trichoptera (caddisflies). It was originally believed that water mite larvae located hosts by accidental contact, but recent studies have found they likely utilize a combination of visual, tactile, and chemical cues. Even though larvae are capable of sensing the presence of a nearby host, it has been suggested that they are unable to distinguish between host species, and rather select hosts solely based on spatial and temporal coincidence. The abundance of water mites in a region, as well as prevalence and intensity of host infection, are impacted by a multitude of environmental and biological factors, and have shown great geographic variation. In some cases, high infection intensities have significantly increased chances of host mortality and reduced fecundity. Water mite larvae have been considered as a potential biological control agents, although low natural infection intensities warrant supplementation with other control strategies in order to be effective.

Some water mites continue to be parasites in their post-larval stages. These are mainly associated with molluscs, such as mussels (Najadicola ingens and many species of Unionicola) and snails (two species of Dockovdia). That said, not all associations with other animals are parasitic; some Unionicola species merely use other animals as safe, well-oxygenated places to lay eggs and to pass their resting stages (protonymph, deutonymph).

=== Mosquitoes as hosts ===
The majority of water mites found parasitic on mosquitoes belong to two genera: Parathyas (Hydryphantidae) and Arrenurus (Arrenuridae). The biology and ecology of these specific host-mite interactions have been well studied, likely due to the significant relevance of mosquitoes to human health.

Parathyas barbigera are among the most common mite species found parasitizing mosquitoes, especially those of the genera Aedes and Ochlerotatus. Their host range is likely much wider, as studies have detected P. barbigera parasitizing other dipteran families, such as Tipulidae (crane flies), Ptychopteridae (phantom crane flies), Chloropidae (grass flies), and Empididae (dagger flies). These mites are typically abundant along the margins of temporary ponds, springs, streams, and seepage areas in North America and Europe. Nymphs and adults can be seen crawling and mating along substrate beginning in early Spring, soon after the recession of surface ice. Eggs are laid soon after the thaw, and larvae typically emerge and begin host seeking within 30–40 days. According to Mullen (1977), P. barbigera attach exclusively to female mosquitoes as they land near the water's edge to oviposit, which was supported by an extensive field study in which he observed zero mite larvae on 15,000 Aedes pupae, and dissection of parasitized females revealed them all to be parous. Mullen hypothesized that this life history strategy increased chances of mite survival two-fold because those parasitizing males would likely die before returning to a suitable adult habitat. No literature was found discussing the impact of P. barbigera on mosquito physiology and survival.

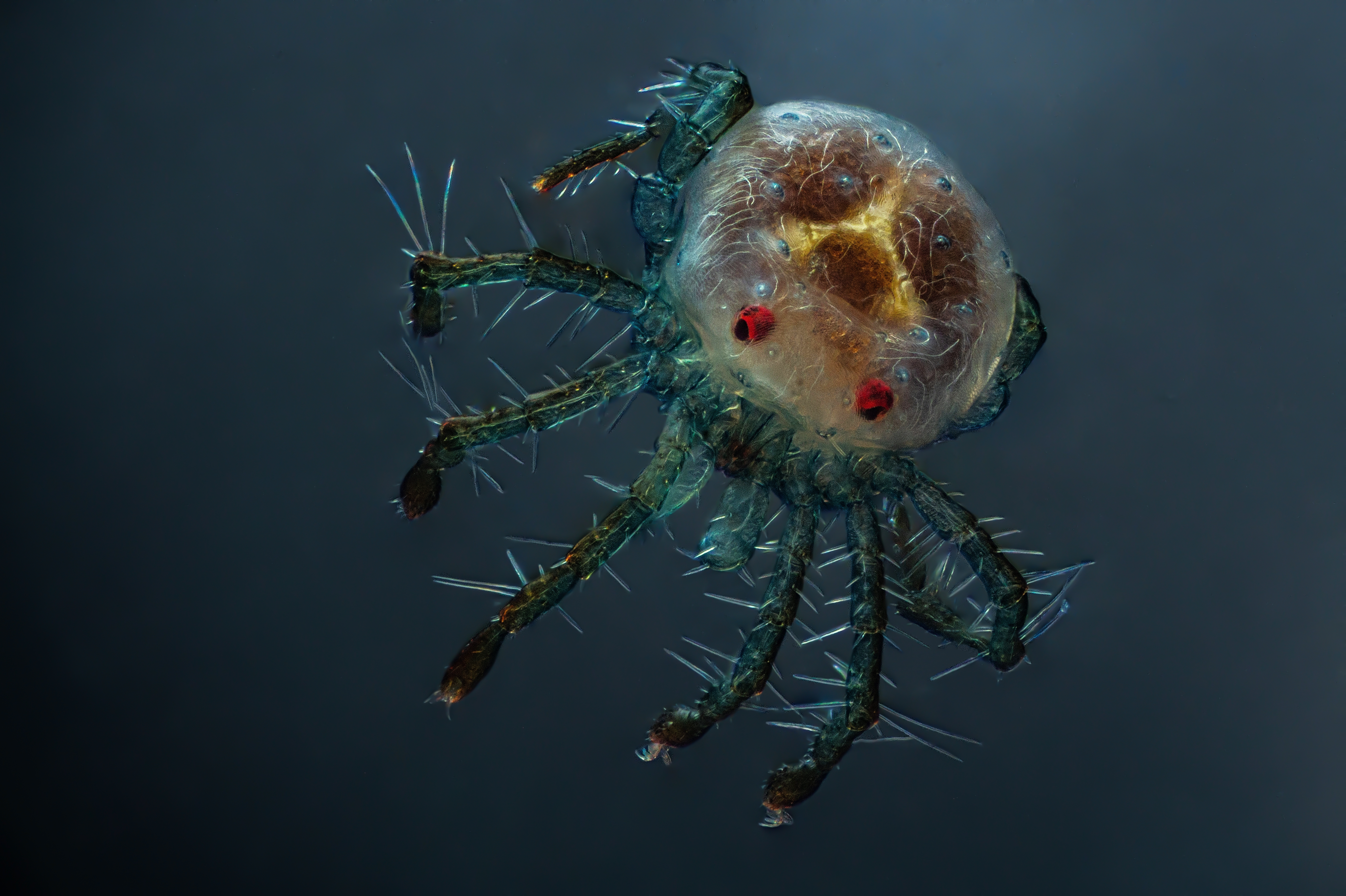
Water mite from a city pond in Rakvere. Estonia

Larval mites of the genus Arrenurus are also common ectoparasites of many mosquito species. In contrast to P. barbigera, Arrenurus mites are fully aquatic and prefer permanent habitats, such as swamps and marshes. Females lay eggs in protected areas hidden among the abundant vegetation of these habitats, and upon hatching, larvae can be found swimming throughout the upper water column in search of hosts. Once an immature host is located, Arrenurus larvae loosely bind to their integument, and monitor them until the adult emerges. Host muscle contractions just prior to emergence stimulate mite larvae to move towards the ecdysial opening and attach to the host along intersegmental sutures on their thorax and abdomen. Differences in preferred attachment site between mite species appear to be related to differences in host emergence behavior. Full larval engorgement takes approximately three days, during which they have the potential to significantly impact the health of their host. In laboratory settings, the survival of Anopheles crucians mosquitoes parasitized by Arrenurus (Meg.) pseudotenuicollis was found to decrease from 23.32 to 6.25 days between those harboring the least and greatest numbers of attached mites respectively. Under similar conditions, infection intensities equalling 17-32 mites decreased the number of eggs laid by gravid An. crucians by nearly 100%. High mite loads also significantly decreased the fecundity of field-collected An. crucians, but to a lesser extent than those infected in the lab. Similar consequences of high Arrenurus mite infection intensities were observed in other host-mite relationships. For example, Smith and McIver (1984) found that Arrenurus danbyensis loads of greater than 5 mites decreased the fecundity of Coquillettidia perturbans females by approximately 3.5 eggs per additional mite. Even though Arrenurus mite larvae have been considered as potential biocontrol agents, unrealistic numbers would need to be released in order to prove effective on their own.

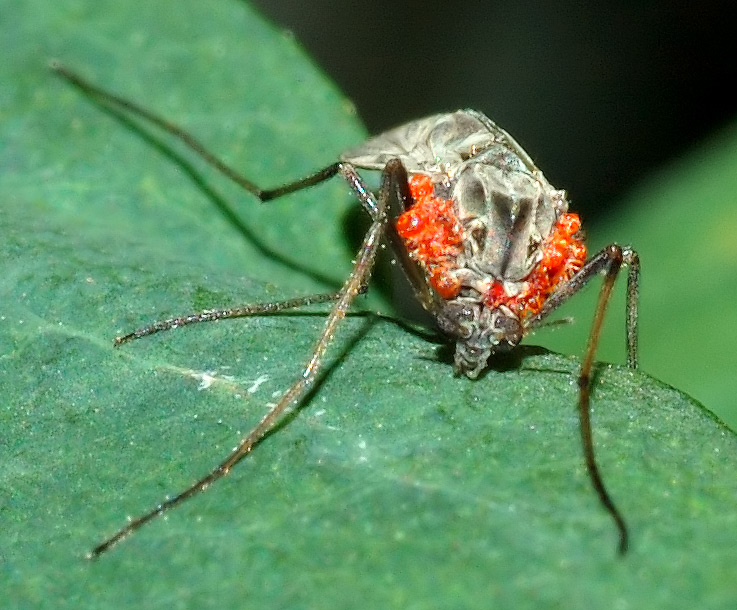
Gnat infested with freshwater mites

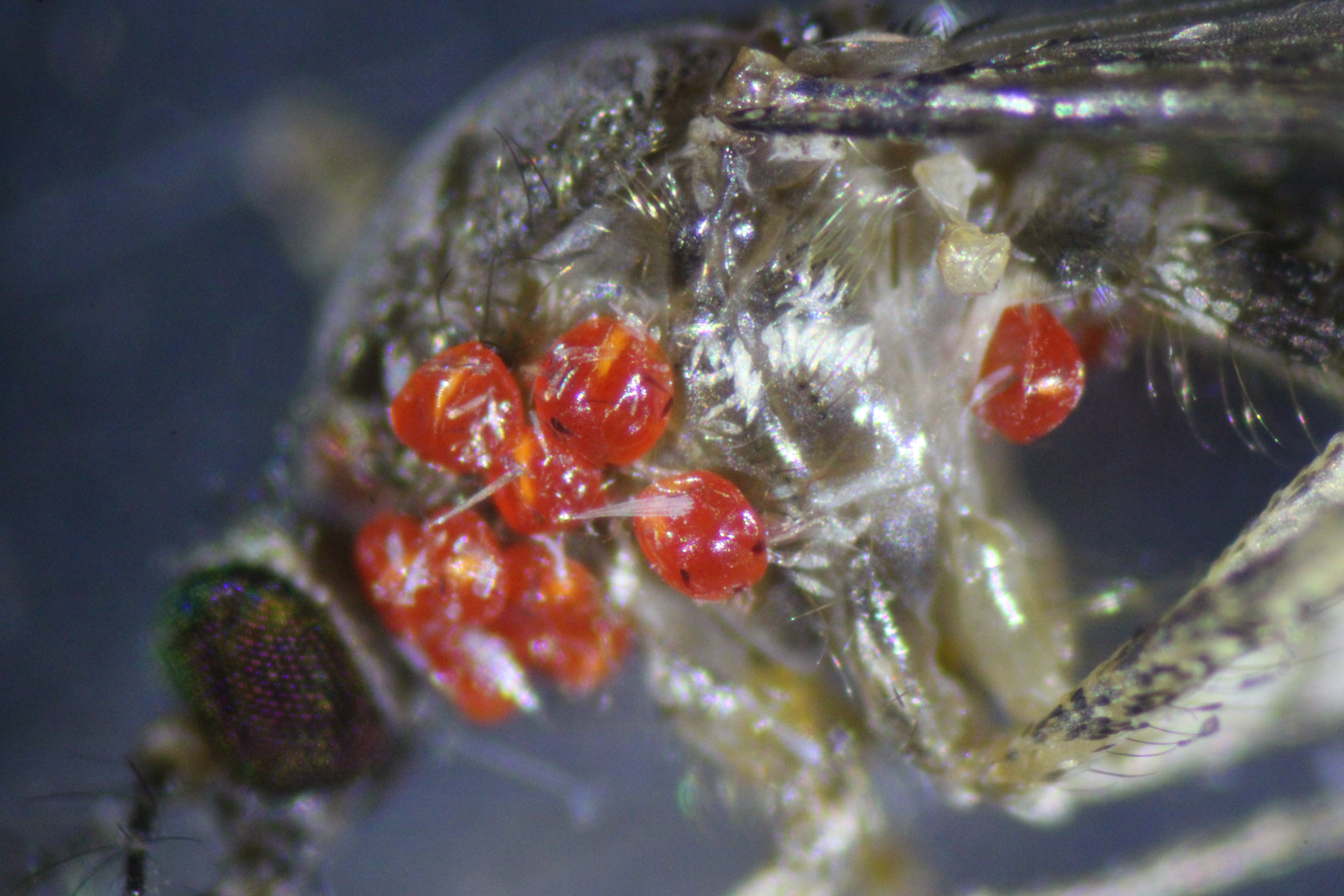
Coquillettidia perturbans parasitized by Arrenurus danbyensis larvae

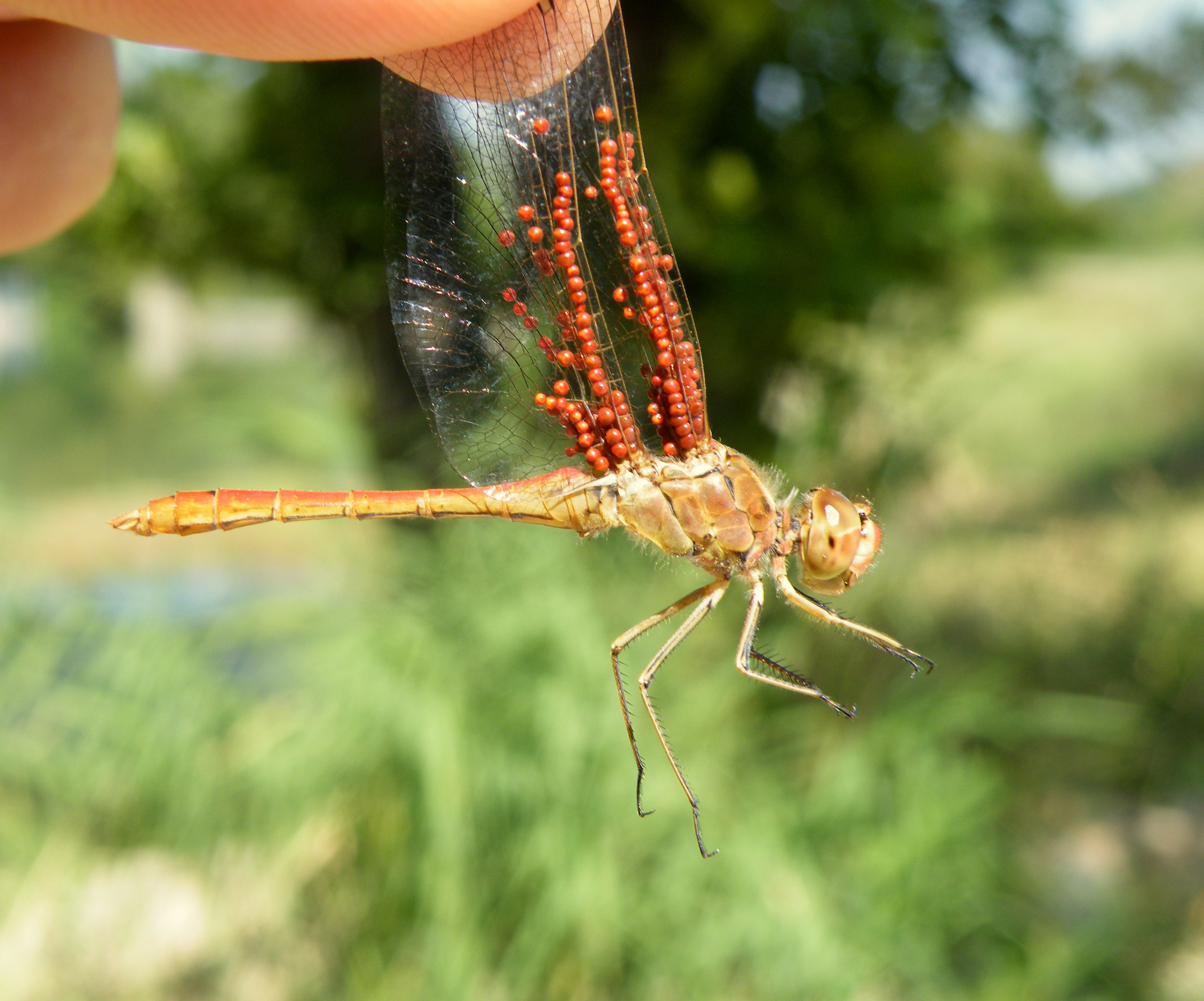
Sympetrum meridionale with water mites parasiting its wings

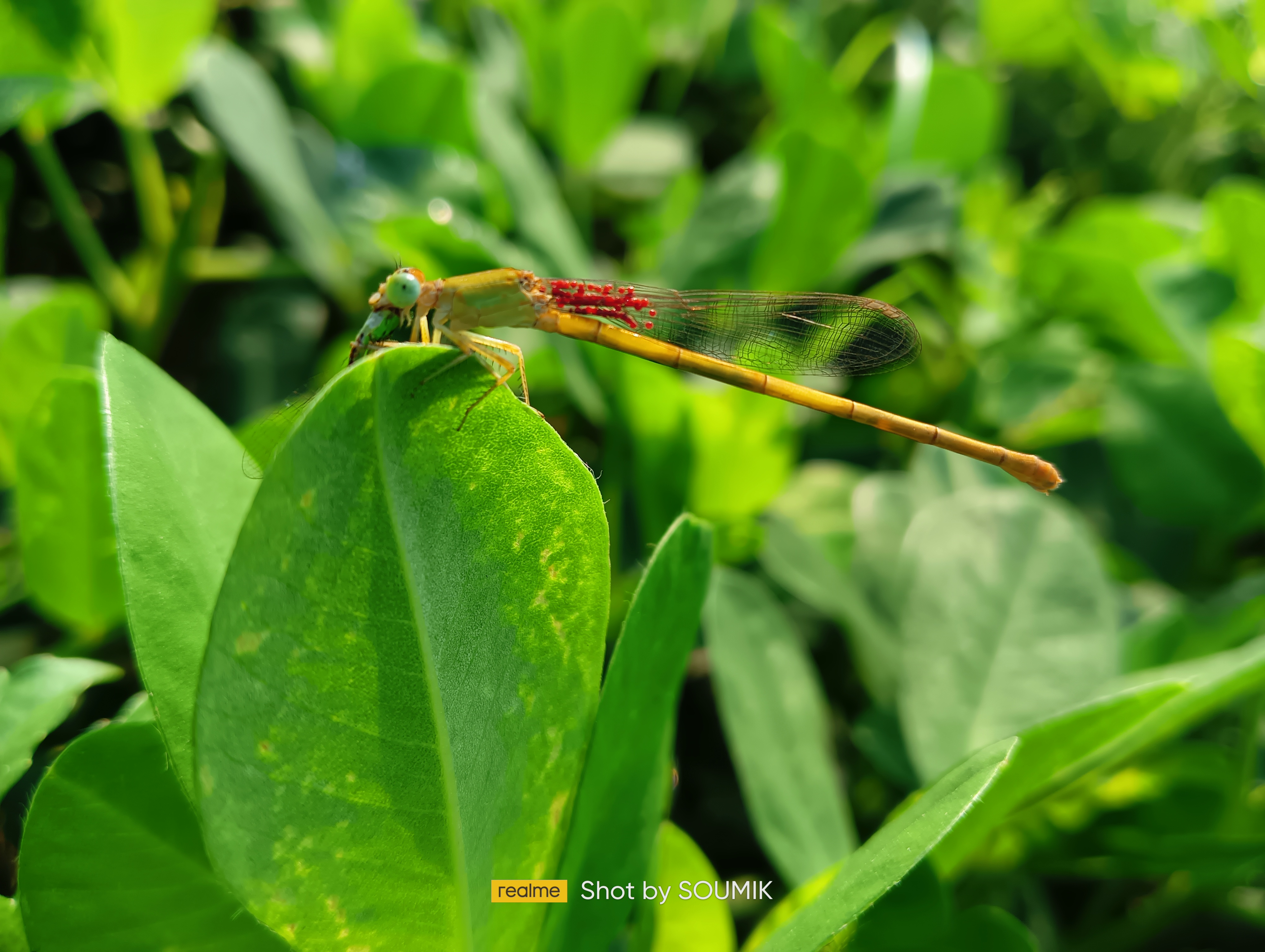
Ceriagrion coromandelianum damselfly infested with Hydracarina mites

== Predation ==
Nymphs and adults of water mites are predatory. They prey on other water mites, small crustaceans (e.g. cladocerans, ostracods and copepods), the eggs, larvae and pupae of aquatic insects, and non-arthropod invertebrates such as rotifers, nematodes, and oligochaetes. The egg-eating water mites often prey on the eggs of the same insects they parasitise as larvae. To feed, water mites bite prey, inject saliva containing digestive enzymes to liquefy the tissue, and suck out the liquid.

== Evolutionary history ==
The oldest known water mites are from the Onder Karoo locality within the Karoo Supergroup in South Africa, dating to the Wordian stage of the Middle Permian, approximately 266 million years ago.
