= Calyptostoma expalpe =

Calyptostoma

Scientific classification
- Kingdom: Animalia
- Phylum: Arthropoda
- Subphylum: Chelicerata
- Class: Arachnida
- Order: Trombidiformes
- Family: Calyptostomatidae
- Genus: Calyptostoma
- Species: C. expalpe

Binomial name
- Calyptostoma expalpe (Hermann, 1804)

Species of mite

Calyptostoma expalpe is a species of mite in the genus Calyptostoma.
