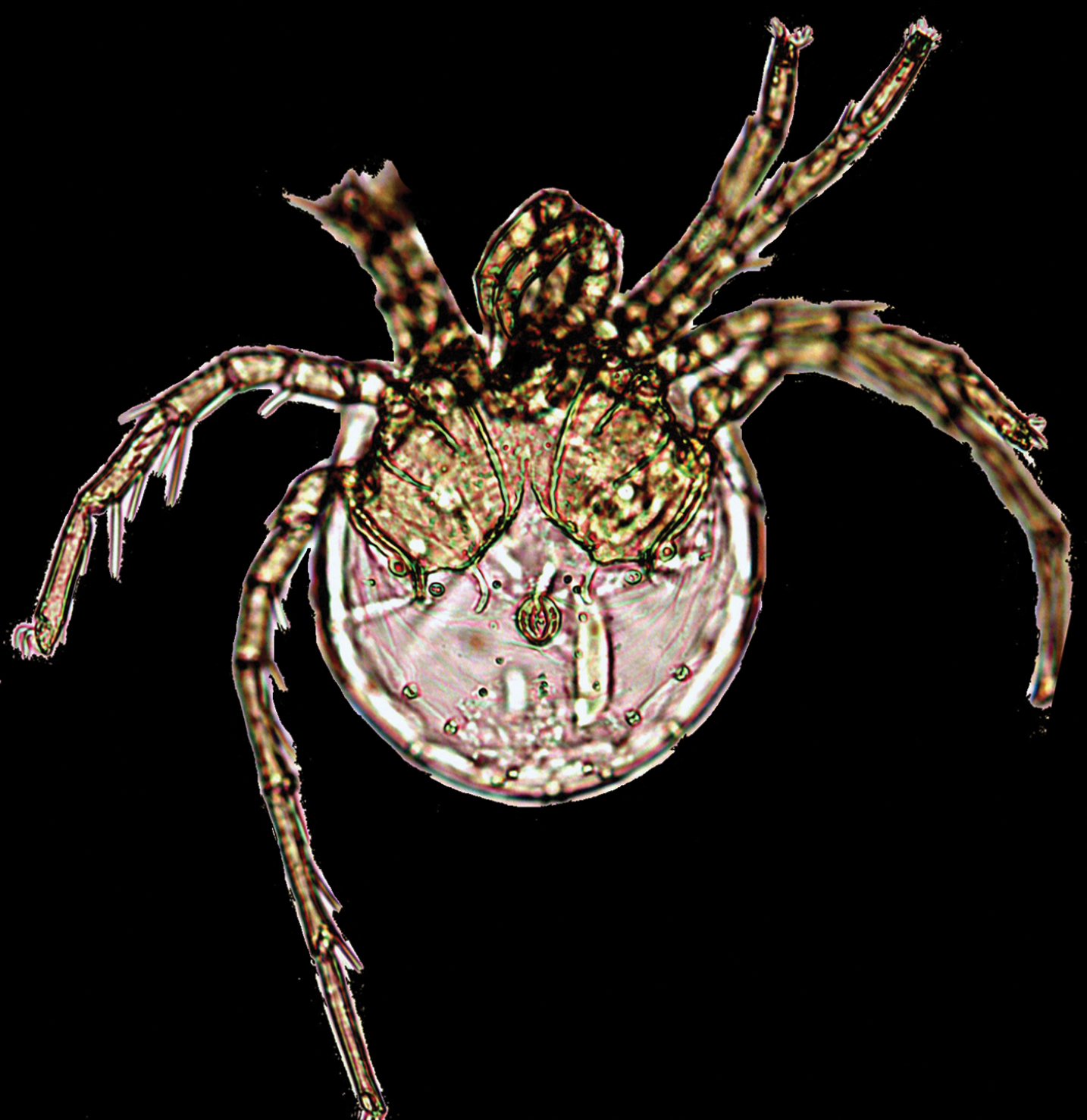

Scientific classification
- Kingdom: Animalia
- Phylum: Arthropoda
- Subphylum: Chelicerata
- Class: Arachnida
- Order: Trombidiformes
- Family: Pontarachnidae
- Genus: Litarachna
- Species: L. lopezae

Binomial name
- Litarachna lopezae Pešić et al., 2014

= Litarachna lopezae =

Aquatic mite from Puerto Rico named after Jennifer Lopez

Litarachna lopezae is a species of aquatic mite in the order Trombidiformes. Found around depths of 70 meters in the Mona Passage, Puerto Rico, the species was named after Jennifer Lopez.

== See also ==
- List of organisms named after famous people (born 1950–1974)
