= Zschokkea (mite) =

Scientific classification
- Kingdom: Animalia
- Phylum: Arthropoda
- Subphylum: Chelicerata
- Class: Arachnida
- Order: Trombidiformes
- Family: Thyasidae
- Genus: Zschokkea; Koenike, 1892

Genus of mites

Zschokkea is a genus of mites in the family Thyasidae. There are at least three described species in Zschokkea. Zschokkea is sometimes placed in the family Hydryphantidae.

== Species ==
These three species belong to the genus Zschokkea:

- Zschokkea bruzelii Lundblad
- Zschokkea oblonga Koenike, 1892
- Zschokkea ontariensis Smith & Cook, 2009-01
