= Thyasidae =

Scientific classification
- Kingdom: Animalia
- Phylum: Arthropoda
- Subphylum: Chelicerata
- Class: Arachnida
- Order: Trombidiformes
- Family: Thyasidae

Family of mites

Thyasidae is a family of mites in the order Trombidiformes. There are about 7 genera and more than 30 described species in Thyasidae.

== Genera ==
These nine genera belong to the family Thyasidae:

- Euthyas Piersig, 1898
- Thyas Dall, 1900
- Thyasides Lundblad, 1926
- Thyopsella Cook, 1955
- Thyopsis Piersig, 1899
- Trichothyas Viets, 1926
- Zschokkea Koenike, 1892
