= Africasia =

Africasia may refer to:

- Africasia (mite), a genus of mites in the family Athienemanniidae
- Africasia, a genus of flies in the family Sarcophagidae, synonym of Africasiomyia
- Africasia, a French journal, later name Afrique Asie
