= Euthyas =

Scientific classification
- Kingdom: Animalia
- Phylum: Arthropoda
- Subphylum: Chelicerata
- Class: Arachnida
- Order: Trombidiformes
- Family: Thyasidae
- Genus: Euthyas; Piersig, 1898

Genus of spiders

Euthyas is a genus of mites belonging to the family Thyasidae.

The species of this genus are found in Europe and Northern America.

Species:

- Euthyas elephantula Gerecke, 1996
- Euthyas truncata (Neuman, 1874)
