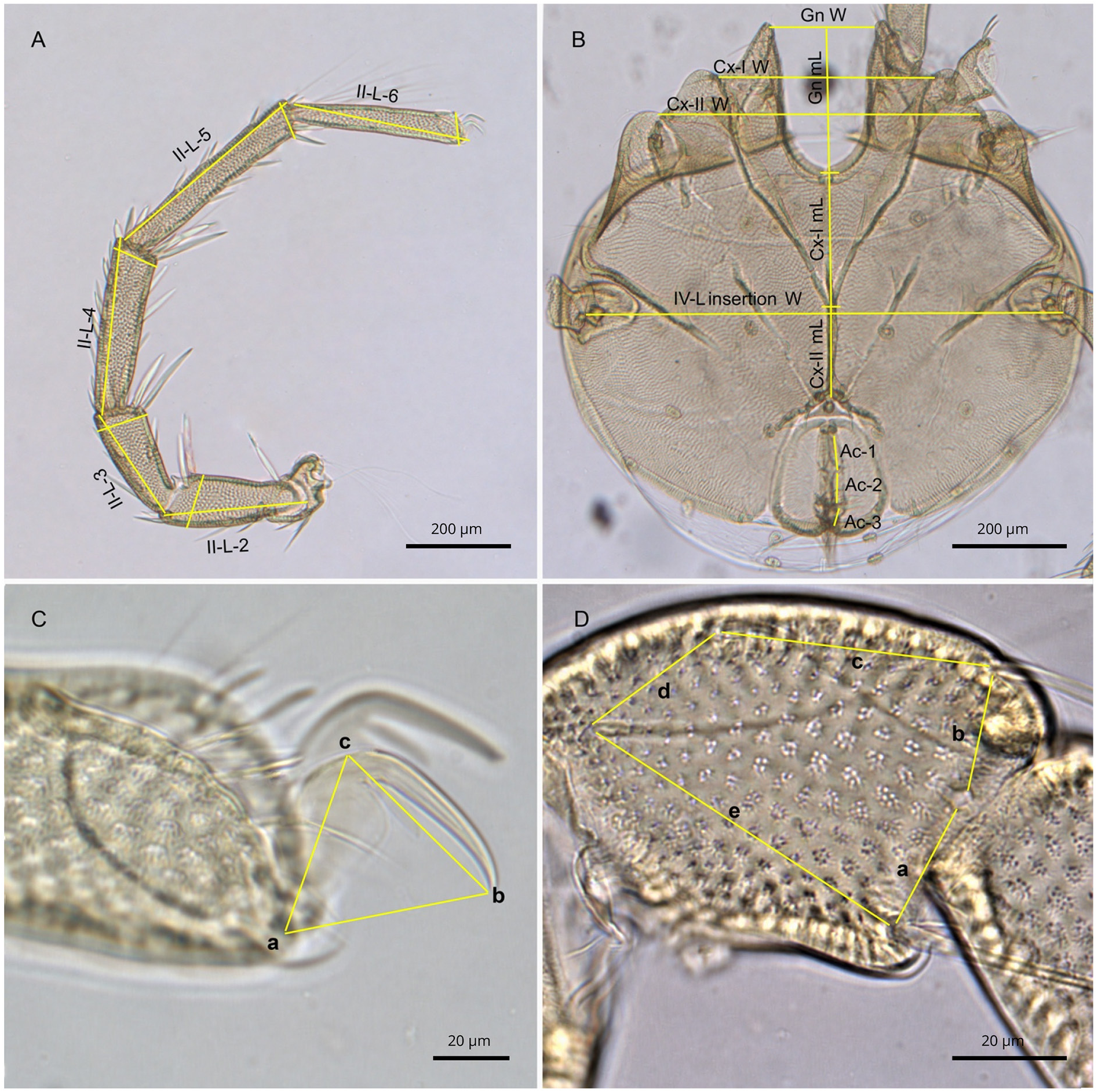
- Genus Lebertia

Scientific classification
- Domain: Eukaryota
- Kingdom: Animalia
- Phylum: Arthropoda
- Subphylum: Chelicerata
- Class: Arachnida
- Order: Trombidiformes
- Family: Lebertiidae
- Genus: Lebertia; Neumann, 1880

= Lebertia =

Genus of mites

Lebertia is a genus of mites belonging to the family Lebertiidae.

Species:

- Lebertia aberrans Sokolow, 1934
- Lebertia aberrata Viets, 1922
