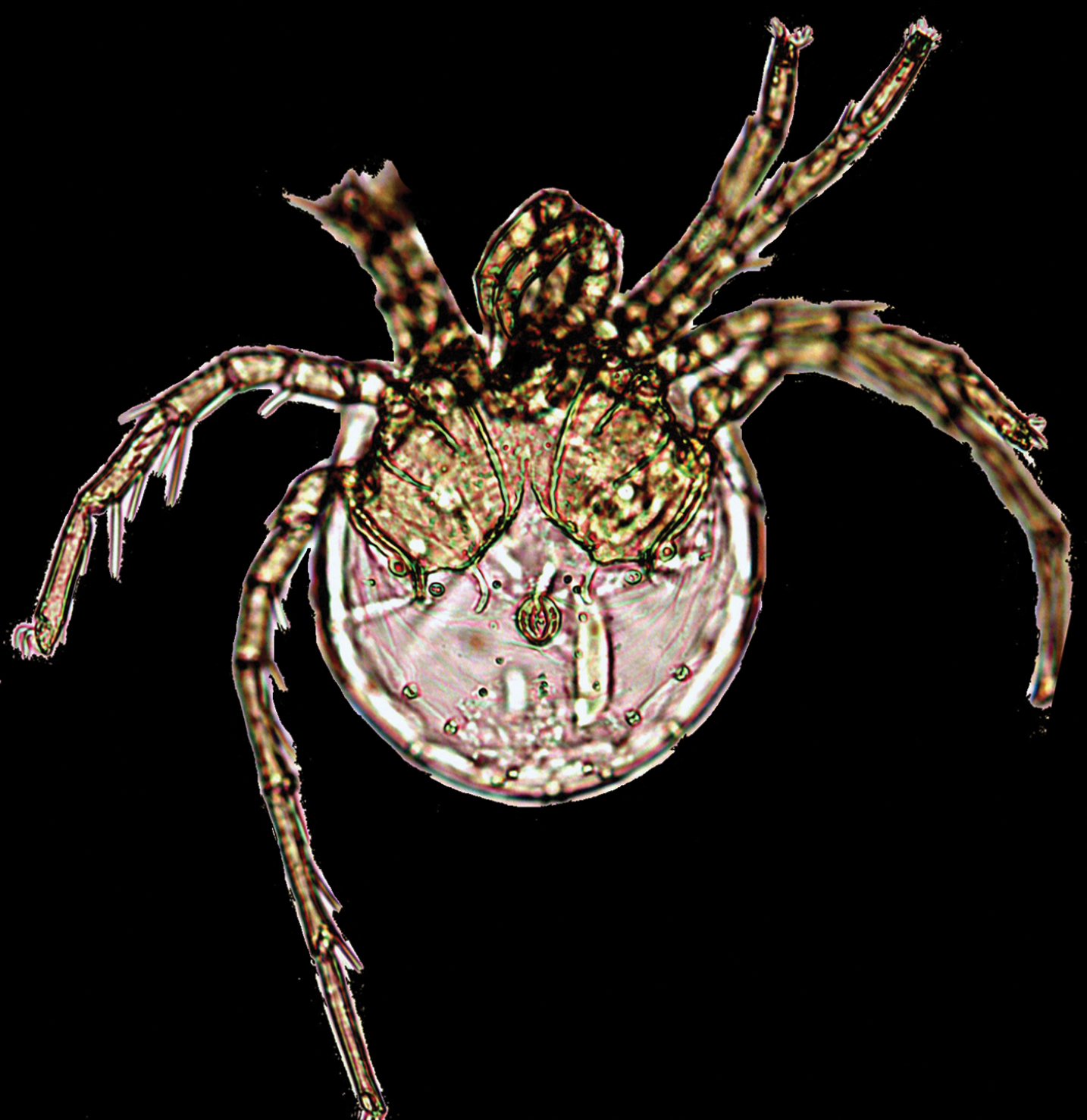
- Litarachna lopezae

Scientific classification
- Kingdom: Animalia
- Phylum: Arthropoda
- Subphylum: Chelicerata
- Class: Arachnida
- Order: Trombidiformes
- Family: Pontarachnidae
- Genus: Litarachna; Walter, 1925

= Litarachna =

Genus of mites

Litarachna is a genus of mites belonging to the family Pontarachnidae.

The species of this genus are found in Europe, Eastern Asia and Australia.

Species:

- Litarachna amnicola Cook, 1986
- Litarachna antalyaensis Pešić, Durucan & Chatterjee, 2018
- Litarachna bartschae Smit, 2003
- Litarachna brasiliensis Smit, 2007
- Litarachna bruneiensis Pesic, Chatterjee, Marshall & Pavicevic, 2011
- Litarachna caribica Pesic, Chatterjee & Schizas, 2008
- Litarachna cawthorni Wiles, Chatterjee & De Troch, 2002
- Litarachna communis Walter, 1925
- Litarachna curtipalpis Smit, 2003
- Litarachna degiustii Cook, 1958
- Litarachna denhami (Lohmann, 1909)
- Litarachna divergens Walter, 1925
- Litarachna duboscqi Walter, 1925
- Litarachna enigmatica Pešić, Durucan & Chatterjee, 2018
- Litarachna gracilis Pesic, 2013
- Litarachna halei (Womersley, 1937)
- Litarachna haleioides Smit, 2016
- Litarachna hongkongensis Smit, 2002
- Litarachna incerta Walter, 1925
- Litarachna indica Pesic, Chatterjee & Ingole, 2012
- Litarachna kamui Uchida, 1935
- Litarachna lopezae Pesic, Chatterjee, Alfaro & Schizas, 2014
- Litarachna lukai Pesic, 2013
- Litarachna madagascariensis Pesic, 2013
- Litarachna marshalli Wiles, Chatterjee & De Troch, 2002
- Litarachna minuta Pesic, Chatterjee & Marshall, 2013
- Litarachna muelleri Smit, 2008
- Litarachna muratsezgini Pešić, Durucan & Zawal, 2019
- Litarachna sabangensis K.O.Viets, 1984
- Litarachna sagamiensis Moto & Abé, 2013
- Litarachna smiti Pesic, Chatterjee, Ahmed & Abada, 2008
- Litarachna thetis Pešić & Smit, 2016
- Litarachna triangularis Smit, 2009
