= Thyopsis =

Scientific classification
- Kingdom: Animalia
- Phylum: Arthropoda
- Subphylum: Chelicerata
- Class: Arachnida
- Order: Trombidiformes
- Family: Thyasidae
- Genus: Thyopsis; Piersig, 1899

Genus of spiders

Thyopsis is a genus of mites belonging to the family Thyasidae.

The species of this genus are found in Europe and Northern America.

Species:

- Thyopsis cancellata (Protz, 1896)
- Thyopsis rothae Ozkan, 1982
