= Notopanisus =

Scientific classification
- Kingdom: Animalia
- Phylum: Arthropoda
- Subphylum: Chelicerata
- Class: Arachnida
- Order: Trombidiformes
- Family: Hydryphantidae
- Genus: Notopanisus; Besch, 1964

Genus of spiders

Notopanisus is a genus of mites belonging to the family Hydryphantidae.

The species of this genus are found in Australia.

Species:

- Notopanisus vinnulus Harvey, 1988
