= Sperchon =

Scientific classification
- Domain: Eukaryota
- Kingdom: Animalia
- Phylum: Arthropoda
- Subphylum: Chelicerata
- Class: Arachnida
- Order: Trombidiformes
- Family: Sperchontidae
- Genus: Sperchon

Genus of spiders

Sperchon is a genus of mites belonging to the family Sperchontidae.

The species of this genus are found in Eurasia and Northern America.

Species:

- Sperchon avimontis Habeeb, 1957
- Sperchon ayyildizi
