= Protzia =

Scientific classification
- Kingdom: Animalia
- Phylum: Arthropoda
- Subphylum: Chelicerata
- Class: Arachnida
- Order: Trombidiformes
- Family: Hydryphantidae
- Genus: Protzia; Piersig, 1896

Genus of spiders

Protzia is a genus of mites belonging to the family Protziidae.

The species of this genus are found in Europe, Japan and Northern America.

Species:

- Protzia annularis Lundblad, 1954
- Protzia athletica Gerecke, 1996
