= Sperchonopsis =

Scientific classification
- Domain: Eukaryota
- Kingdom: Animalia
- Phylum: Arthropoda
- Subphylum: Chelicerata
- Class: Arachnida
- Order: Trombidiformes
- Family: Sperchontidae
- Genus: Sperchonopsis; Piersig, 1896

Genus of spiders

Sperchonopsis is a genus of mites belonging to the family of Sperchontidae.

The species of this genus are found in Europe and Northern America.

Species:

- Sperchonopsis phreaticus Biesiadka, 1975
