= Hydrodroma =

Scientific classification
- Kingdom: Animalia
- Phylum: Arthropoda
- Subphylum: Chelicerata
- Class: Arachnida
- Order: Trombidiformes
- Family: Hydrodromidae
- Genus: Hydrodroma; Koch, 1837

Genus of spiders

Hydrodroma is a genus of mites belonging to the family Hydrodromidae. The genus has cosmopolitan distribution.

== Species ==
- Hydrodroma amoenoderma
- Hydrodroma australis
- Hydrodroma bruneiensis
- Hydrodroma cooki
- Hydrodroma despiciens
- Hydrodroma golestanica
- Hydrodroma kakadu
- Hydrodroma kununurra
- Hydrodroma lasioderma
- Hydrodroma megalonyx
- Hydrodroma meridionalis
- Hydrodroma mesembrina
- Hydrodroma monticola
- Hydrodroma perreptans
- Hydrodroma persica
- Hydrodroma pilosa
- Hydrodroma poseidon
- Hydrodroma reinhardi
- Hydrodroma rheophila
- Hydrodroma tonapii
- Hydrodroma torrenticola
- Hydrodroma wilesi
- Hydrodroma zhokhovi
