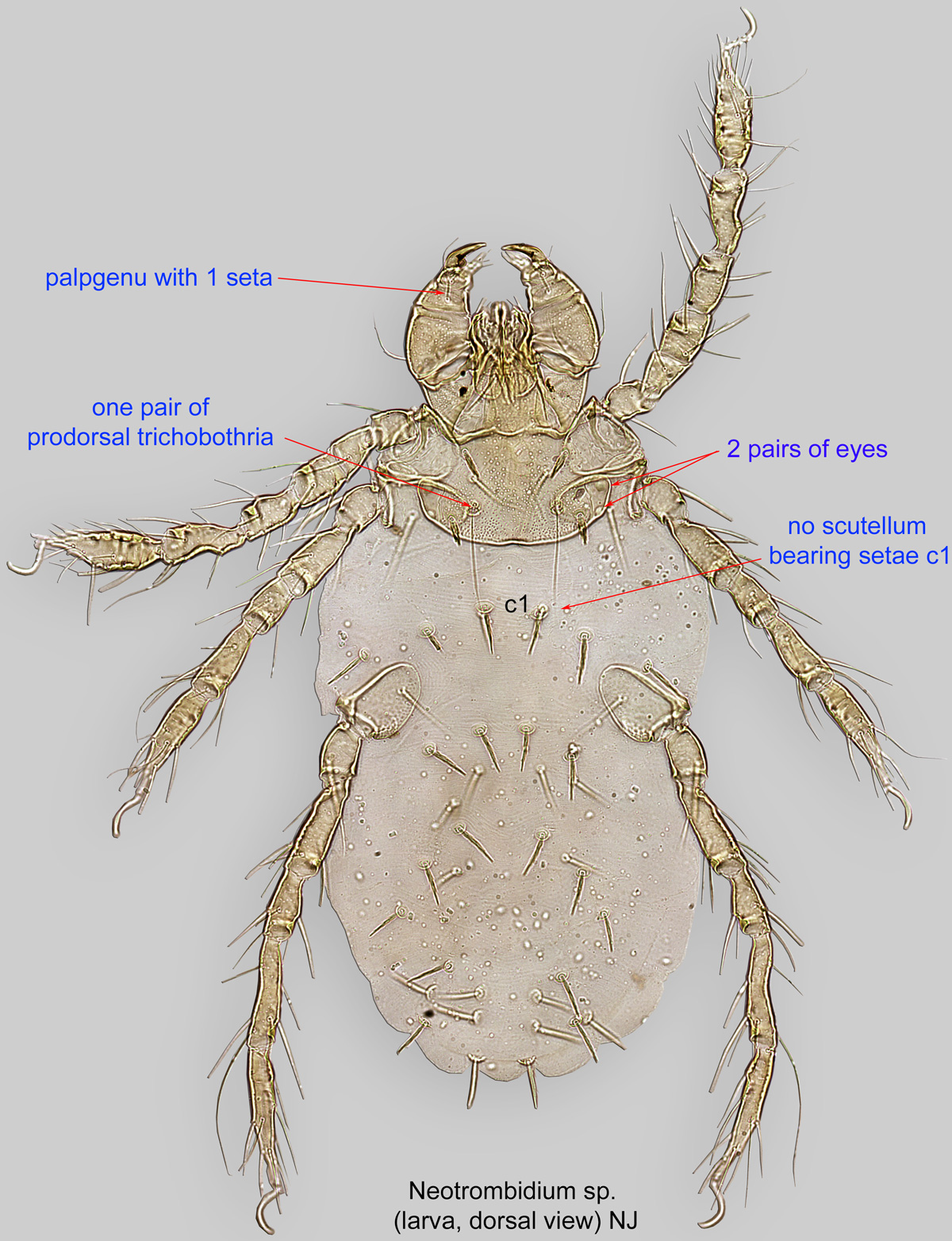

Scientific classification
- Domain: Eukaryota
- Kingdom: Animalia
- Phylum: Arthropoda
- Subphylum: Chelicerata
- Class: Arachnida
- Order: Trombidiformes
- Family: Neotrombidiidae
- Genus: Neotrombidium; Leonardi, 1901

= Neotrombidium =

Genus of mites

Neotrombidium is a genus of velvet mites and chiggers in the family Neotrombidiidae. There are at least three described species in Neotrombidium.

== Species ==
These three species belong to the genus Neotrombidium:

- Neotrombidium beeri^{b}
- Neotrombidium helladicum Cooreman, 1960^{g}
- Neotrombidium samsinaki (Daniel, 1963)^{g}

Data sources: i = ITIS, c = Catalogue of Life, g = GBIF, b = Bugguide.net
