= Krendowskia =

Scientific classification
- Domain: Eukaryota
- Kingdom: Animalia
- Phylum: Arthropoda
- Subphylum: Chelicerata
- Class: Arachnida
- Order: Trombidiformes
- Family: Krendowskiidae
- Genus: Krendowskia; Piersig, 1895

Genus of spiders

Krendowskia is a genus of arachnids belonging to the family Krendowskiidae.

Species:

- Krendowskia latissima Piersig, 1895
- Krendowskia levantensis Smit, 1997
