= Hydryphantes =

Scientific classification
- Domain: Eukaryota
- Kingdom: Animalia
- Phylum: Arthropoda
- Subphylum: Chelicerata
- Class: Arachnida
- Order: Trombidiformes
- Family: Hydryphantidae
- Genus: Hydryphantes; Koch, 1841

Genus of spiders

Hydryphantes is a genus of mites belonging to the family Hydryphantidae.

The genus has cosmopolitan distribution.

Species:

- Hydryphantes abnormis Koenike, 1908
- Hydryphantes acutus
