= Mideopsis =

Scientific classification
- Kingdom: Animalia
- Phylum: Arthropoda
- Subphylum: Chelicerata
- Class: Arachnida
- Order: Trombidiformes
- Family: Mideopsidae
- Genus: Mideopsis; Neuman, 1880

Genus of arachnids

Mideopsis is a genus of mites belonging to the family Mideopsidae.

The species of this genus are found in Europe, Africa, Japan and Northern America.

Species:

- Mideopsis americana Marshall, 1940
- Mideopsis biverrucata Viets
