= Lebertiidae =

Scientific classification
- Kingdom: Animalia
- Phylum: Arthropoda
- Subphylum: Chelicerata
- Class: Arachnida
- Order: Trombidiformes
- Superfamily: Lebertioidea
- Family: Lebertiidae; Thor, 1900

Family of mites

Lebertiidae is a family of prostigs in the order Trombidiformes. There are at least 2 genera and about 14 described species in Lebertiidae.

== Genera ==
- Estelloxus Habeeb, 1963
- Lebertia Neuman, 1880
