= Africasia (mite) =

Scientific classification
- Domain: Eukaryota
- Kingdom: Animalia
- Phylum: Arthropoda
- Subphylum: Chelicerata
- Class: Arachnida
- Order: Trombidiformes
- Family: Athienemanniidae
- Genus: Africasia; Viets, 1931

Genus of mites

Africasia is a genus of mites belonging to the family Athienemanniidae.

The species of this genus are found in Africa.

Species:

- Africasia acuticoxalis
- Africasia comorosensis Smit & Pešić, 2010
- Africasia mahadensis Cook, 1967
- Africasia navina Cook, 1967
- Africasia pinguipalpis Cook, 1967
- Africasia rotunda Smit, 2017
- Africasia rucira Cook, 1967
- Africasia ruksa Cook, 1967
- Africasia subterranea Cook, 1967
- Africasia vietnamitica
