= Sperchontidae =

Scientific classification
- Kingdom: Animalia
- Phylum: Arthropoda
- Subphylum: Chelicerata
- Class: Arachnida
- Order: Trombidiformes
- Superfamily: Lebertioidea
- Family: Sperchontidae

Family of mites

Sperchontidae is a family of prostigs in the order Trombidiformes. There are at least 3 genera and about 19 described species in Sperchontidae.

== Genera ==
- Apeltosperchon
- Sperchon Kramer, 1877
- Sperchonopsis Piersig, 1896
