= Johnstonianidae =

Scientific classification
- Kingdom: Animalia
- Phylum: Arthropoda
- Subphylum: Chelicerata
- Class: Arachnida
- Order: Trombidiformes
- Suborder: Prostigmata
- Infraorder: Anystina
- Superfamily: Trombidioidea
- Family: Johnstonianidae

Family of mites

Johnstonianidae is a family of mites in the order Trombidiformes. There are about 7 genera and more than 20 described species in Johnstonianidae.

== Genera ==
These seven genera belong to the family Johnstonianidae:

- Centrotrombidium Kramer, 1896
- Charadracarus Newell, 1960
- Diplothrombium Berlese, 1910
- Hirstiothrombium Oudemans, 1947
- Johnstoniana George, 1909
- Marcandreella Feider, 1957
- Tetrathrombium Feider, 1955
