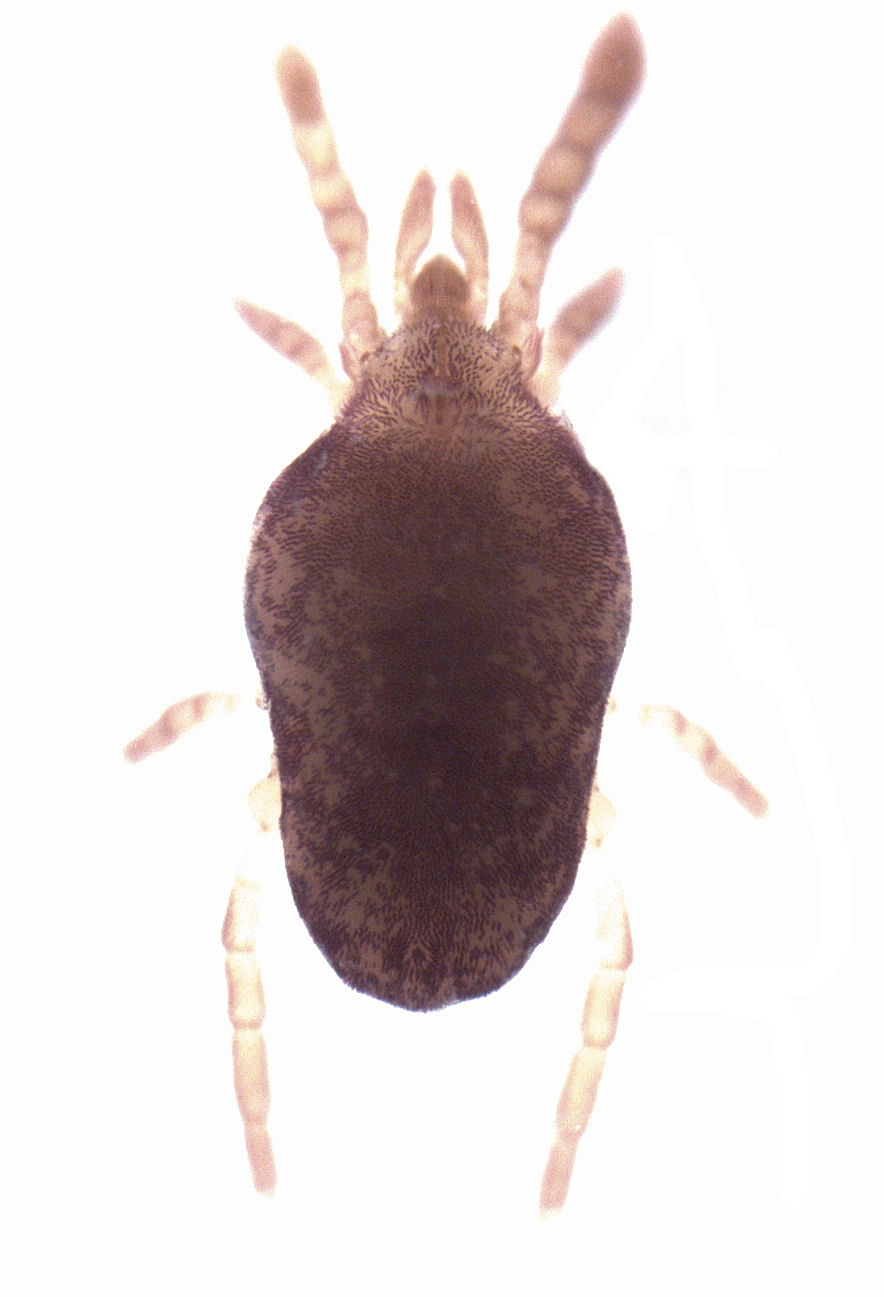
- adult Microtrombidium sp. (dorsal)

Scientific classification
- Kingdom: Animalia
- Phylum: Arthropoda
- Subphylum: Chelicerata
- Class: Arachnida
- Order: Trombidiformes
- Superfamily: Trombidioidea
- Family: Microtrombidiidae; Thor, 1935

= Microtrombidiidae =

Microtrombidiidae Temporal range: Palaeogene–present

Family of mites

Microtrombidiidae is a family of micro velvet mites in the order Trombidiformes. There are about five genera and seven described species in Microtrombidiidae.

Several modern studies include "Eutrombidiidae" as Subfamily Eutrombidiinae

== Genera ==
- Ettmulleria
- Eutrombidium
- Holcotrombidium
- Microtrombidium
- Platytrombidium
