= Parathyas =

Scientific classification
- Domain: Eukaryota
- Kingdom: Animalia
- Phylum: Arthropoda
- Subphylum: Chelicerata
- Class: Arachnida
- Order: Trombidiformes
- Family: Hydryphantidae
- Genus: Parathyas; Lundblad, 1926

Synonyms
- Thyas Koch, 1836 (non. Hübner, 1824, preoccupied)

Genus of spiders

Parathyas is a genus of mites belonging to the family Hydryphantidae.

The species of this genus are found in Europe and Northern America.

Species:

- Parathyas barbigera (Viets, 1908)
- Parathyas bruzelii (Lundblad, 1926)
