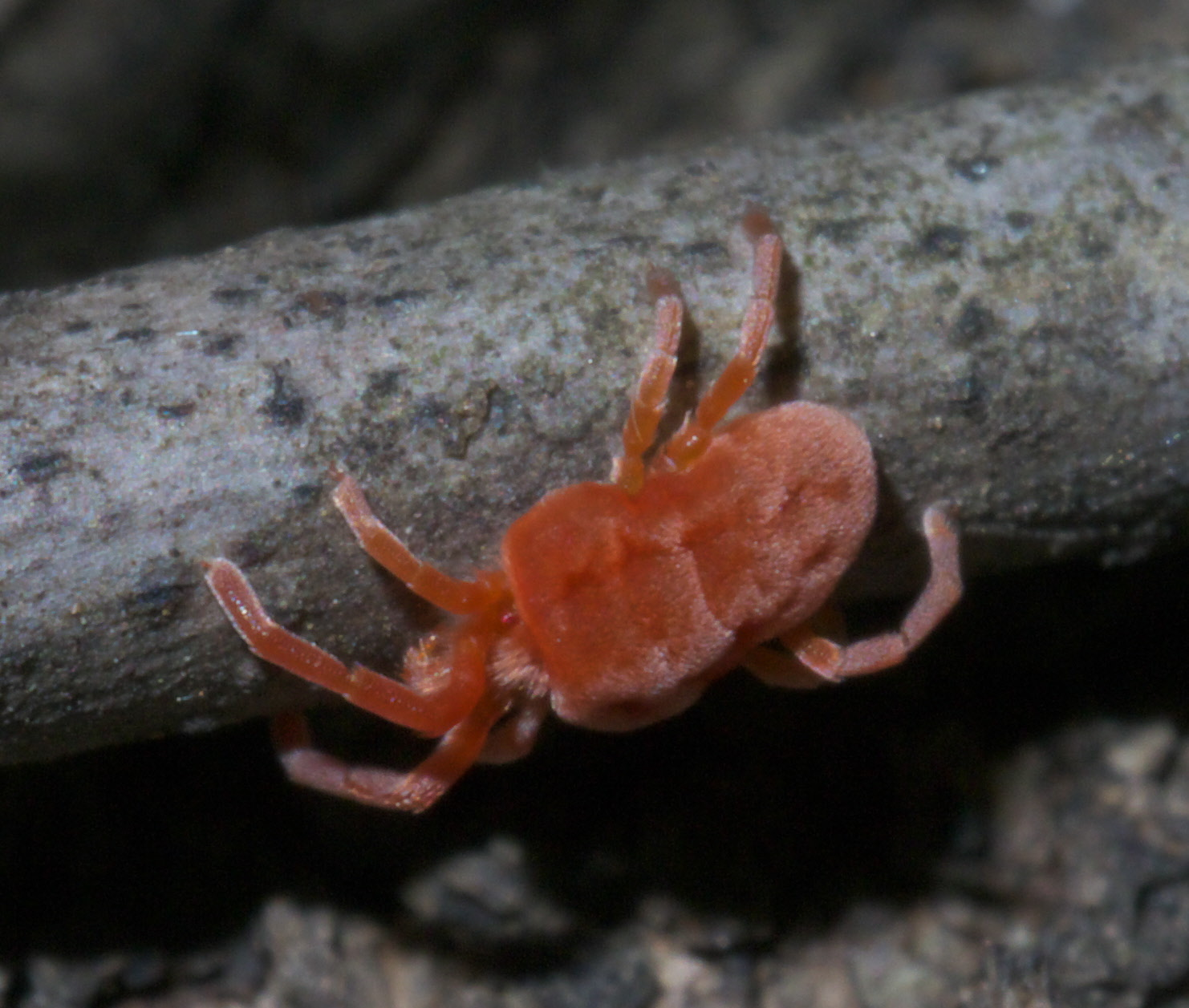
- Allothrombium

Scientific classification
- Kingdom: Animalia
- Phylum: Arthropoda
- Subphylum: Chelicerata
- Class: Arachnida
- Order: Trombidiformes
- Infraorder: Anystina
- Superfamily: Trombidioidea; Leach, 1815

= Trombidioidea =

Trombidioidea Temporal range: Palaeogene–present

Superfamily of mites

Trombidioidea is a superfamily of mites in the order Trombidiformes. There are about 8 families and at least 430 described species in Trombidioidea.

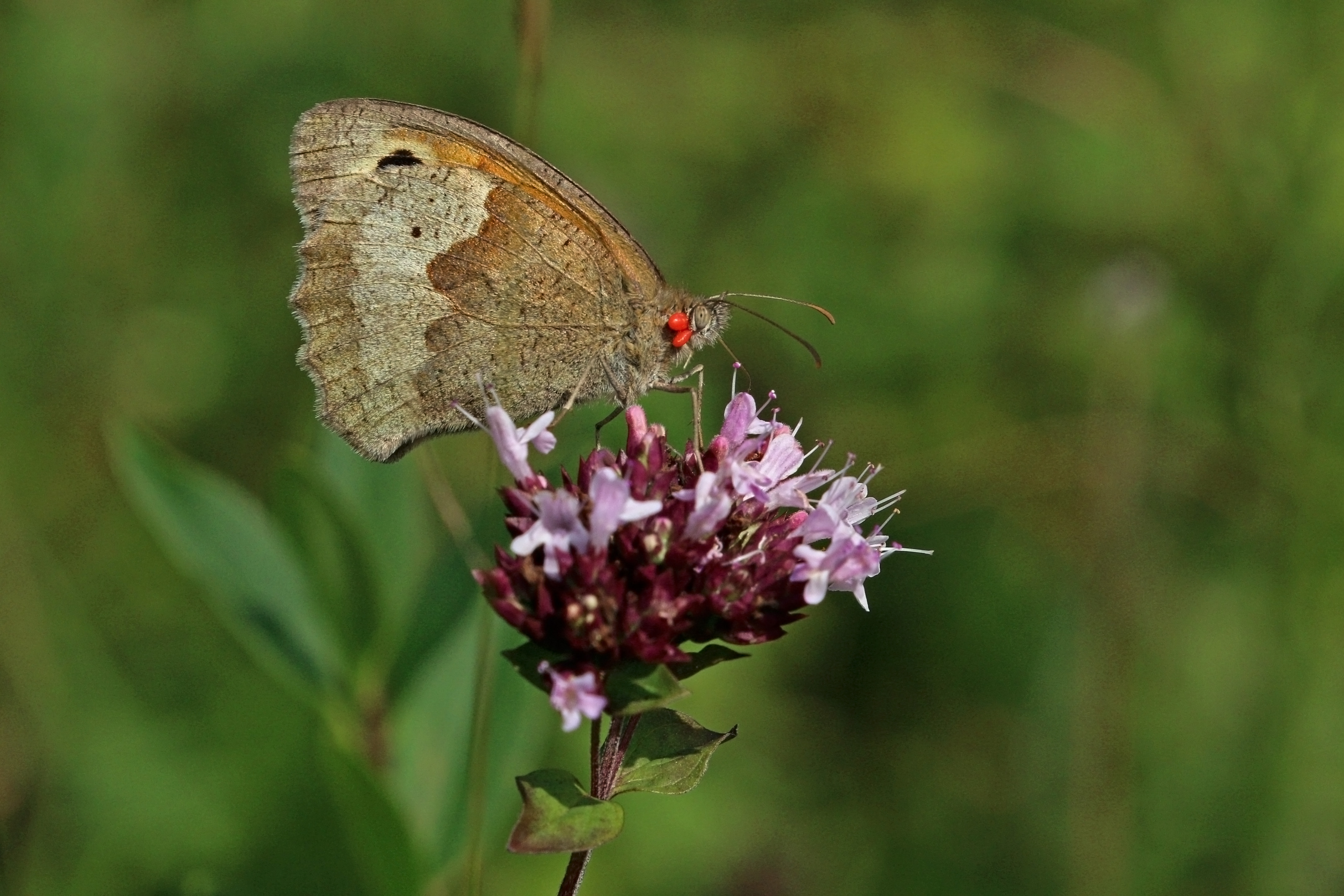
Trombidium breei

== Families ==
These families belong to the superfamily Trombidioidea:

- Johnstonianidae
- Microtrombidiidae (micro velvet mites)
- Neothrombiidae
- Neotrombidiidae
- Podothrombiidae
- Trombiculidae (chiggers)
- Trombidiidae (true velvet mites)

For "Eutrombidiidae", see as subfamily under Microtrombidiidae
Others unplaced:

?Platyseta Wharton, 1938
