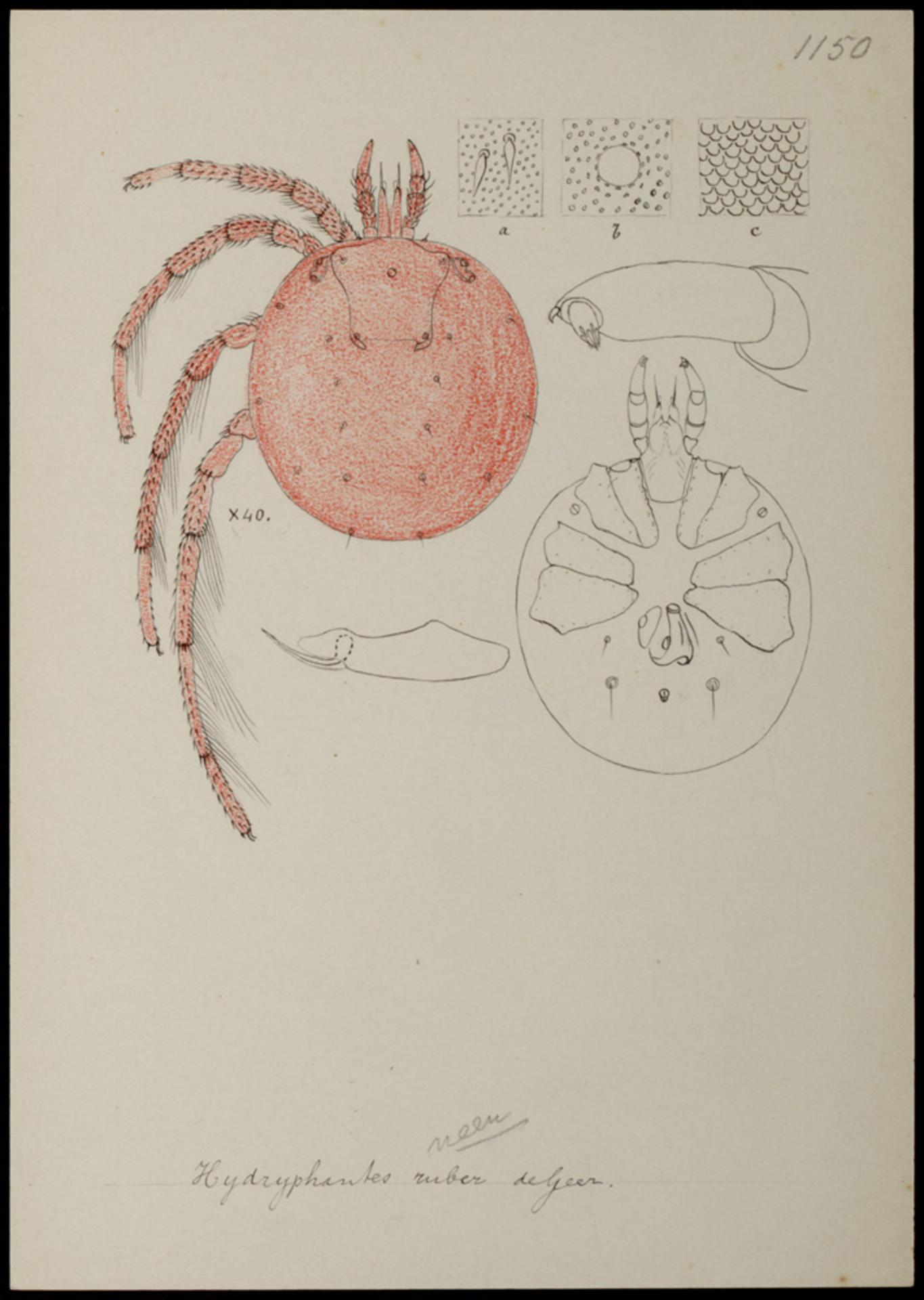
- Hydryphantes

Scientific classification
- Kingdom: Animalia
- Phylum: Arthropoda
- Subphylum: Chelicerata
- Class: Arachnida
- Order: Trombidiformes
- Infraorder: Anystina
- Superfamily: Hydryphantoidea

= Hydryphantoidea =

Superfamily of mites

Hydryphantoidea is a superfamily of mites in the order Trombidiformes. There are about 6 families and more than 250 described species in Hydryphantoidea.

== Families ==
These six families belong to the superfamily Hydryphantoidea:

- Ctenothyadidae
- Hydrodromidae
- Hydryphantidae
- Rhynchohydracaridae
- Teratothyadidae
- Thermacaridae
