= Eylaidae =

Scientific classification
- Kingdom: Animalia
- Phylum: Arthropoda
- Subphylum: Chelicerata
- Class: Arachnida
- Order: Trombidiformes
- Superfamily: Eylaoidea
- Family: Eylaidae

Family of mites

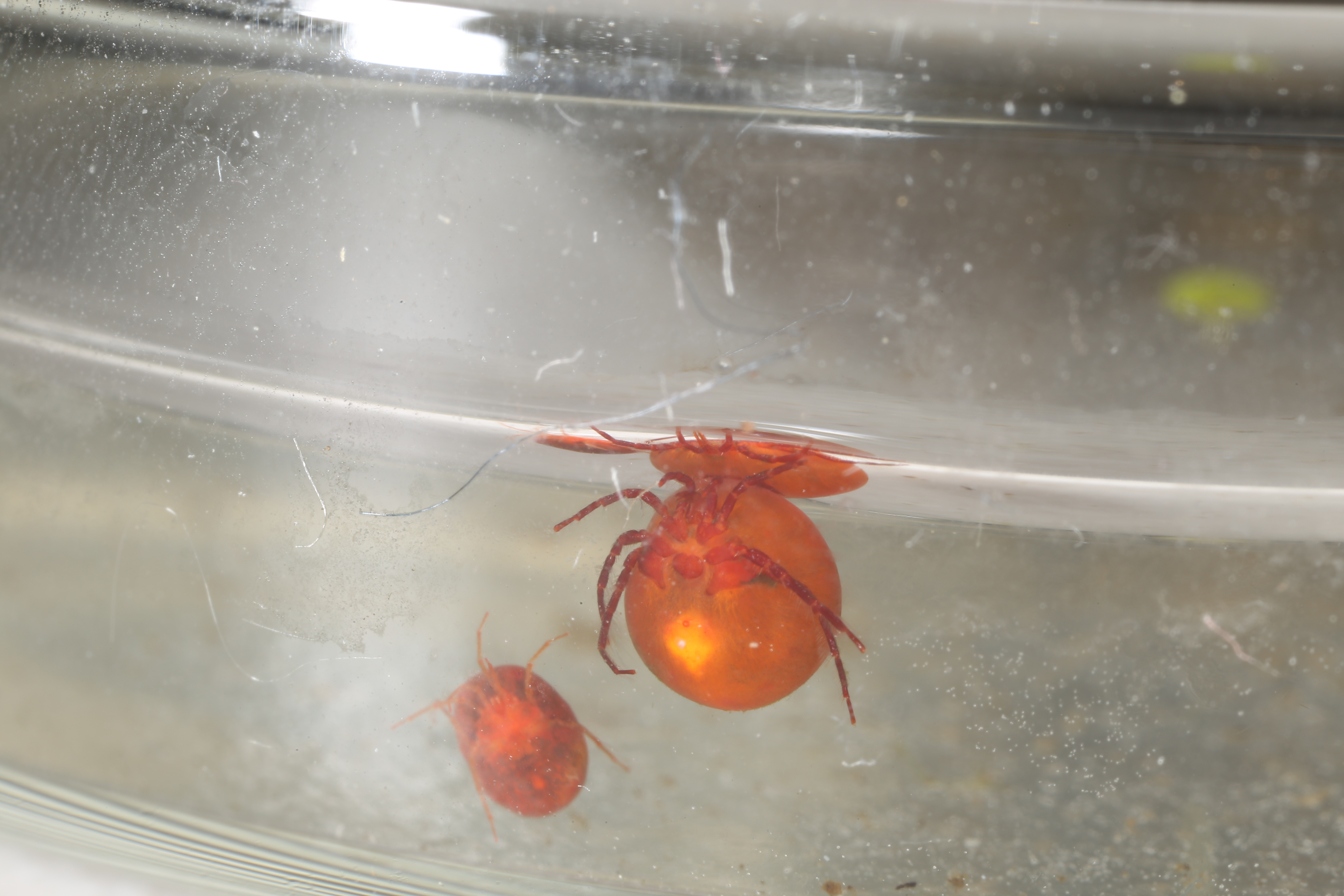

Eylaidae is a family of prostigs in the order Trombidiformes. There is at least one genus, Eylais, and about six described species in Eylaidae.
