= Acalyptonotidae =

Scientific classification
- Kingdom: Animalia
- Phylum: Arthropoda
- Subphylum: Chelicerata
- Class: Arachnida
- Order: Trombidiformes
- Family: Acalyptonotidae

Family of trombidiform mites

Acalyptonotidae is a family of mites belonging to the order Trombidiformes.

Genera:

- Acalyptonotus Walter, 1911
- Paenecalyptonotus Smith, 1976
