= Krendowskiidae =

Scientific classification
- Kingdom: Animalia
- Phylum: Arthropoda
- Subphylum: Chelicerata
- Class: Arachnida
- Order: Trombidiformes
- Superfamily: Arrenuroidea
- Family: Krendowskiidae

Family of mites

Krendowskiidae is a family of mites of the order Trombidiformes. Genera of the family include Geayia and Krendowskia.
