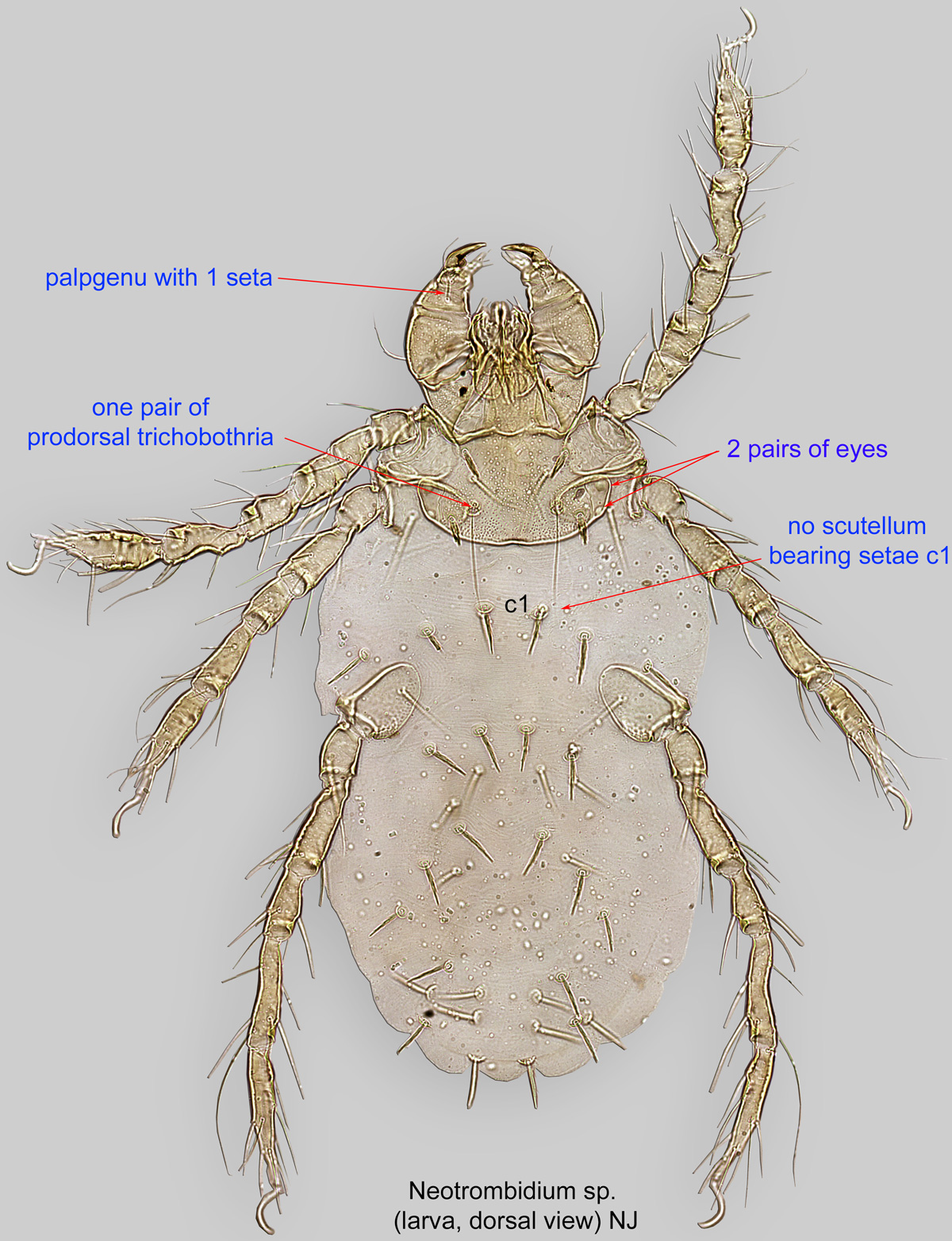
- Neotrombidium

Scientific classification
- Kingdom: Animalia
- Phylum: Arthropoda
- Subphylum: Chelicerata
- Class: Arachnida
- Order: Trombidiformes
- Superfamily: Trombidioidea
- Family: Neotrombidiidae

= Neotrombidiidae =

Family of mites

Neotrombidiidae is a family of velvet mites and chiggers in the order Trombidiformes. There are at least four genera in Neotrombidiidae.

== Genera ==
These four genera belong to the family Neotrombidiidae:

- Anomalothrombium (André, 1936)
- Discotrombidium Feider, 1977
- Monunguis Wharton, 1938
- Neotrombidium Leonardi, 1901
