= Athienemanniidae =

Scientific classification
- Domain: Eukaryota
- Kingdom: Animalia
- Phylum: Arthropoda
- Subphylum: Chelicerata
- Class: Arachnida
- Order: Trombidiformes
- Family: Athienemanniidae

Family of trombidiform mites

Athienemanniidae is a family of mites belonging to the order Trombidiformes.

Genera:

- Africasia Viets, 1931
- Anamundamella Cook, 1992
- Athienemannia Viets, 1920
- Bleptomundamella Cook, 2001
- Chelohydracarus Smith, 1998
- Chelomideopsis Romijn, 1920
- Davecookia Harvey, 2003
- Janszoonia Smit, 2007
- Mellamunda Harvey, 1988
- Mundamella Viets, 1913
- Notomundamella Cook, 1986
- Penemundamella Cook, 2001
- Phreatohydracarus Tanasachi & Orghidan, 1955
- Platyhydracarus Smith, 1989
- Plaumannia Lundblad, 1936
- Stygameracarus Smith, 1990
- Stygohydracarus Viets, 1932
