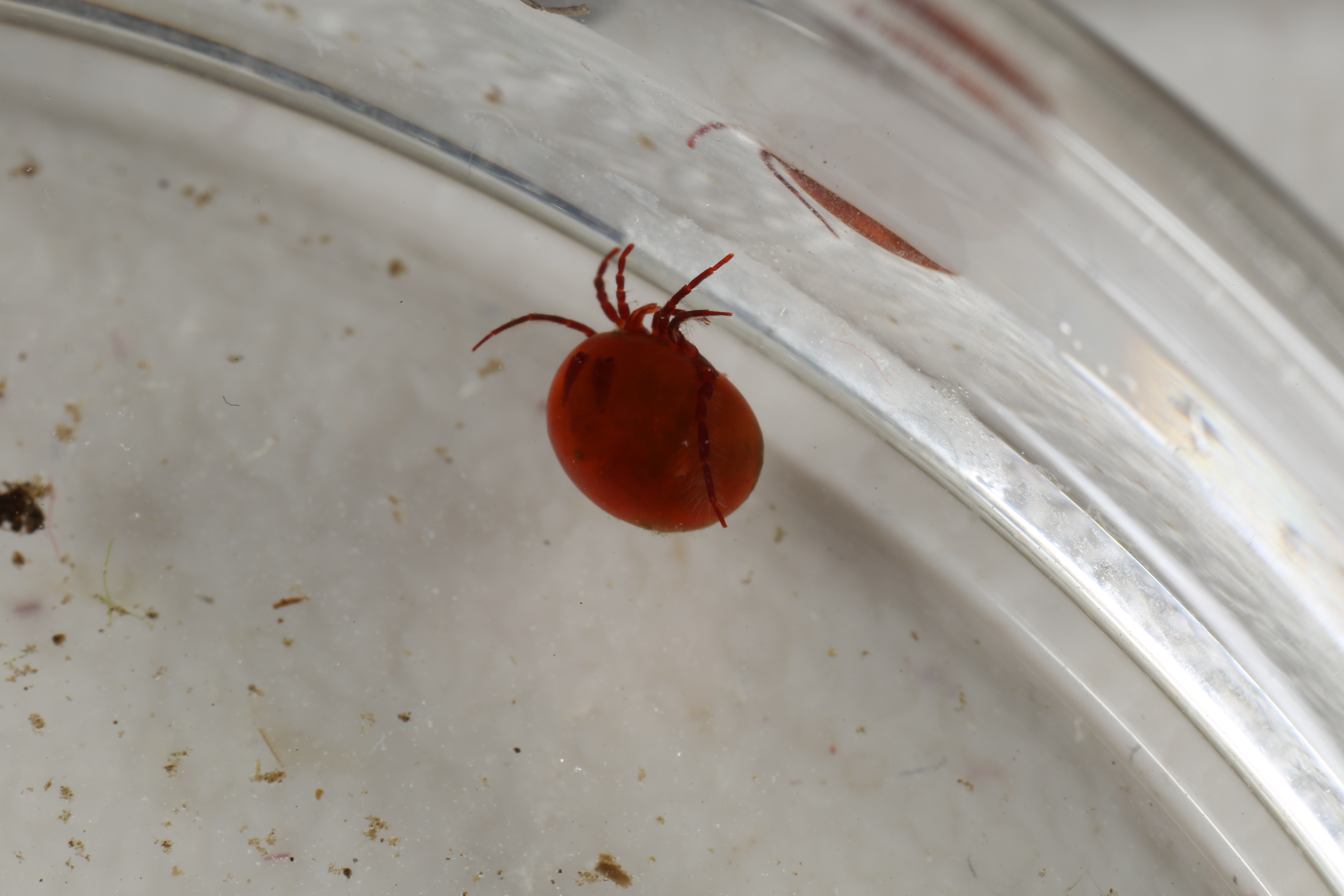
- Eylais sp.

Scientific classification
- Kingdom: Animalia
- Phylum: Arthropoda
- Subphylum: Chelicerata
- Class: Arachnida
- Order: Trombidiformes
- Family: Eylaidae
- Genus: Eylais; Latreille, 1796

= Eylais =

Genus of mites

Eylais is a genus of mites belonging to the family Eylaidae.

The genus has cosmopolitan distribution.

Species:

- Eylais abitibiensis Marshall, 1929
- Eylais amplipons Viets

== Biology ==
Eylais mite larvae are ectoparasites of diving beetles (Dytiscidae). They attach mainly to the ventral side of the hindwings underneath the elytra and may be feeding on hemolymph from here.

The smallest (and hence youngest) larvae occur on beetles in early spring, suggesting that some Eylias overwinter on their hosts. The larvae grow rapidly and reach their maximum size in late June/July, then advance to a nonparasitic life stage. Parasitism rates of Eylias on beetles are highest in early spring, decline through the summer and increase again in autumn.
