= Mideopsidae =

Scientific classification
- Kingdom: Animalia
- Phylum: Arthropoda
- Subphylum: Chelicerata
- Class: Arachnida
- Order: Trombidiformes
- Superfamily: Arrenuroidea
- Family: Mideopsidae

Family of mites

Mideopsidae is a family of prostigs in the order Trombidiformes. There are about 7 genera and 19 described species in Mideopsidae.

== Genera ==
- Guineaxonopsis
- Horreolanus Mitchell, 1955
- Kuschelacarus
- Mideopsis Neuman, 1880
- Nudomideopsis Szalay, 1945
- Paramideopsis Smith, 1983
- Xystonotus Wolcott, 1900
