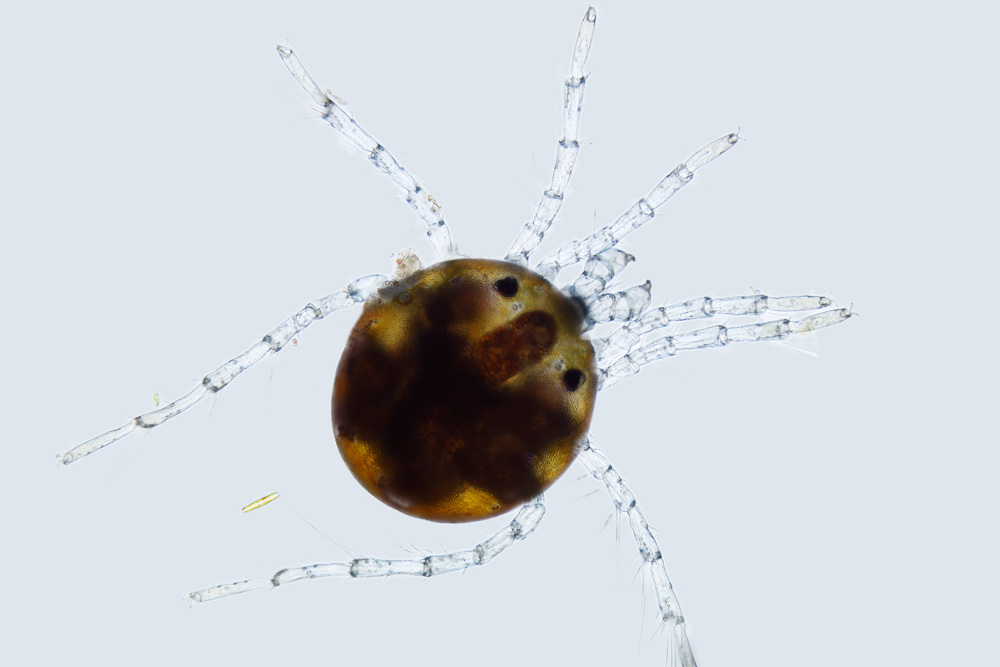
- Hydrachna globosa

Scientific classification
- Kingdom: Animalia
- Phylum: Arthropoda
- Subphylum: Chelicerata
- Class: Arachnida
- Order: Trombidiformes
- Family: Hydrachnidae
- Genus: Hydrachna; O. F. Müller, 1776

= Hydrachna =

Genus of mites

Hydrachna is a genus of mites in the family Hydrachnidae, the sole genus of the family. There are more than 80 described species in Hydrachna. Larvae of this genus are known to be parasites of water beetles such as Eretes griseus by attaching to the back of the thorax and abdomen. These water mite larvae are also parasites of Callicorixa, Corixa, Cymatia and Sigara species, although Sigara falleni has been described as "immune" to these mites, and Cymatia coleoptrata and Sigara striata also gain this "immunity" after a few years of interaction.

== Species ==
These 87 species belong to the genus Hydrachna:

- Hydrachna analis Viets & K.
- Hydrachna approximata Halik, 1940
- Hydrachna baculoscutata Crowell, 1960
- Hydrachna batorligetiensis Szalay, 1953
- Hydrachna bilobata Halik, 1940
- Hydrachna bimaculata Koenike
- Hydrachna bisignifera Viets & K.
- Hydrachna brehmi Szalay, 1955
- Hydrachna bulgarensis K.Viets, 1940
- Hydrachna canadensis Marshall, 1929
- Hydrachna comosa Koenike, 1896
- Hydrachna conjecta Koenike, 1895
- Hydrachna conjectoides Lundblad, 1947
- Hydrachna cordata
- Hydrachna crenulata Marshall, 1930
- Hydrachna cronebergi Koenike, 1897
- Hydrachna cruenta Muller, 1776
- Hydrachna curtiscutata
- Hydrachna danubialis Laska, 1964
- Hydrachna denudata Piersig, 1896
- Hydrachna distincta Koenike, 1897
- Hydrachna dorsoscutata Viets & K.
- Hydrachna eugeni K.H.Viets, 1911
- Hydrachna extorris Koenike, 1897
- Hydrachna geographica Muller, 1776
- Hydrachna georgei Soar, 1908
- Hydrachna globosa (De Geer, 1778)
- Hydrachna goldfeldi Thor, 1916
- Hydrachna guanajuatensis Cook
- Hydrachna halberti Soar, 1908
- Hydrachna hamata Lundblad, 1947
- Hydrachna hesperia Lundblad, 1934
- Hydrachna heterophthalma Viets & K.
- Hydrachna hormuzakii Husiatinschi, 1937
- Hydrachna hungerfordi Lundblad, 1934
- Hydrachna hutchinsoni Lundblad, 1934
- Hydrachna incognita (Wainstein, 1976)
- Hydrachna inermis Piersig, 1895
- Hydrachna inversa Walter, 1927
- Hydrachna juncta Walter, 1926
- Hydrachna laceriscuta Lundblad, 1941
- Hydrachna leegei Koenike
- Hydrachna levigata Koenike, 1897
- Hydrachna levis Williamson, 1913
- Hydrachna linderi Lundblad, 1947
- Hydrachna longiscutata
- Hydrachna lupus Wainstein, 1976
- Hydrachna magniscutata Marshall, 1927
- Hydrachna marita Wainstein, 1966
- Hydrachna marshallae Lundblad, 1934
- Hydrachna microscutata Marshall, 1929
- Hydrachna miliaria Berlese, 1888
- Hydrachna miyazakii Uchida, 1937
- Hydrachna multipora Cook, 1967
- Hydrachna mysorensis Cook, 1967
- Hydrachna mystomirabilis Habeed, 1954
- Hydrachna neocaledonica Smit, 2002
- Hydrachna nonlamellata Viets & K.
- Hydrachna novaehollandica
- Hydrachna oculoscutata Smit, 2002
- Hydrachna orientalis Thon, 1905
- Hydrachna paludosa
- Hydrachna palustris Smit, 1992
- Hydrachna papilligera K.H.Viets, 1919
- Hydrachna perpera Koenike, 1908
- Hydrachna piersigi Koenike, 1897
- Hydrachna processifera Koenike, 1903
- Hydrachna queenslandica
- Hydrachna rectirostris Viets & K.
- Hydrachna rhopaloidea K.H.Viets, 1942
- Hydrachna rotunda Marshall, 1930
- Hydrachna rubicunda K.H.Viets, 1930
- Hydrachna schneideri Koenike, 1895
- Hydrachna similans Marshall, 1928
- Hydrachna simulans Marshall, 1928
- Hydrachna sistanica Pesic, Smit & Saboori, 2012
- Hydrachna stipata Lundblad, 1934
- Hydrachna tasmanica Lundblad, 1947
- Hydrachna tchadensis Smit, 1994
- Hydrachna tenuissima Viets, 1935
- Hydrachna testudinata Cook
- Hydrachna trilobata Viets & K.
- Hydrachna triscutata Lundblad, 1947
- Hydrachna valida
- Hydrachna ventrifissa Viets & K.
- Hydrachna vulpes Wainstein, 1976
- Hydrachna williamsoni Soar, 1908
