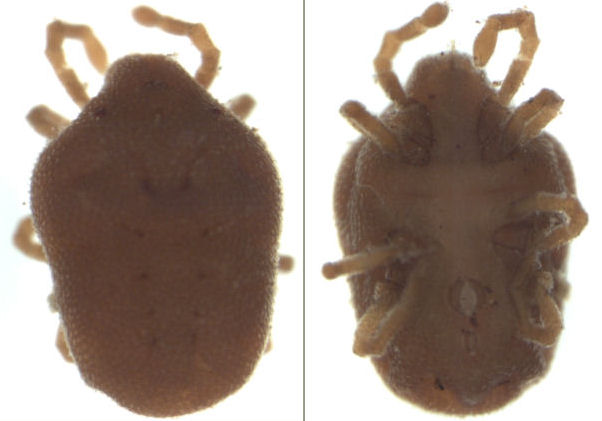

Scientific classification
- Kingdom: Animalia
- Phylum: Arthropoda
- Subphylum: Chelicerata
- Class: Arachnida
- Order: Trombidiformes
- Suborder: Prostigmata
- Infraorder: Anystina
- Superfamily: Calyptostomatoidea
- Family: Calyptostomatidae; Oudemans, 1923

= Calyptostomatidae =

Calyptostomatidae Temporal range: Palaeogene–present

Family of mites

Calyptostomatidae is a family of mites in the order Trombidiformes. There are at least two genera and about six described species in Calyptostomatidae.

== Genera ==
These two genera belong to the family Calyptostomatidae:

- Calyptostoma Cambridge, 1875
- Smaris Latreille, 1796
