= Hydrodromidae =

Scientific classification
- Kingdom: Animalia
- Phylum: Arthropoda
- Subphylum: Chelicerata
- Class: Arachnida
- Order: Trombidiformes
- Superfamily: Hydryphantoidea
- Family: Hydrodromidae

Family of mites

Hydrodromidae is a family of prostigs in the order Trombidiformes. There is at least one genus, Hydrodroma, and at least one described species in Hydrodromidae, H. despiciens.
