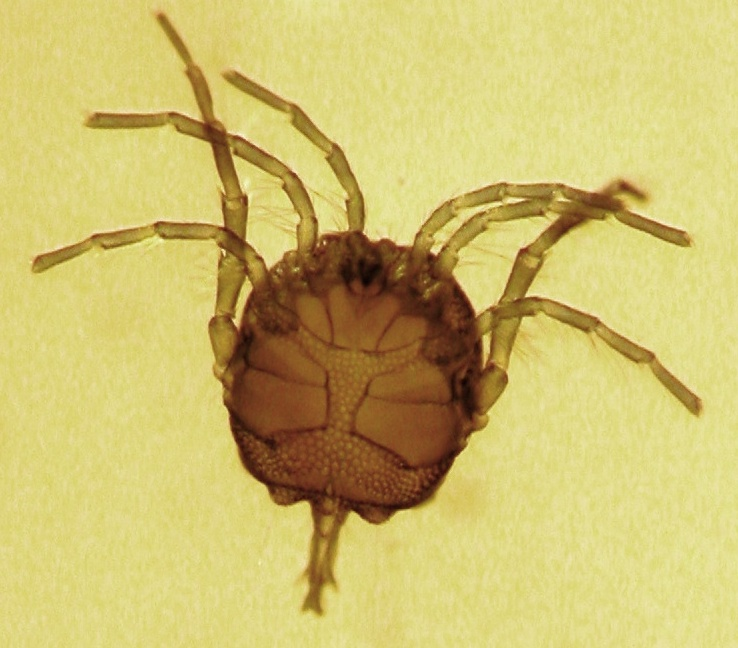
- Arrenurus berolinensis, Protz 1896

Scientific classification
- Kingdom: Animalia
- Phylum: Arthropoda
- Subphylum: Chelicerata
- Class: Arachnida
- Order: Trombidiformes
- Suborder: Prostigmata
- Superfamily: Arrenuroidea
- Family: Arrenuridae; Thor, 1900

= Arrenuridae =

Family of mites

Arrenuridae is a family of prostigs in the order Trombidiformes. There are at least 3 genera and 110 described species in Arrenuridae.

== Genera ==
- Arrenurus Dugès, 1834
- Laversia Cook, 1955
- Micruracaropsis Viets, 1939
