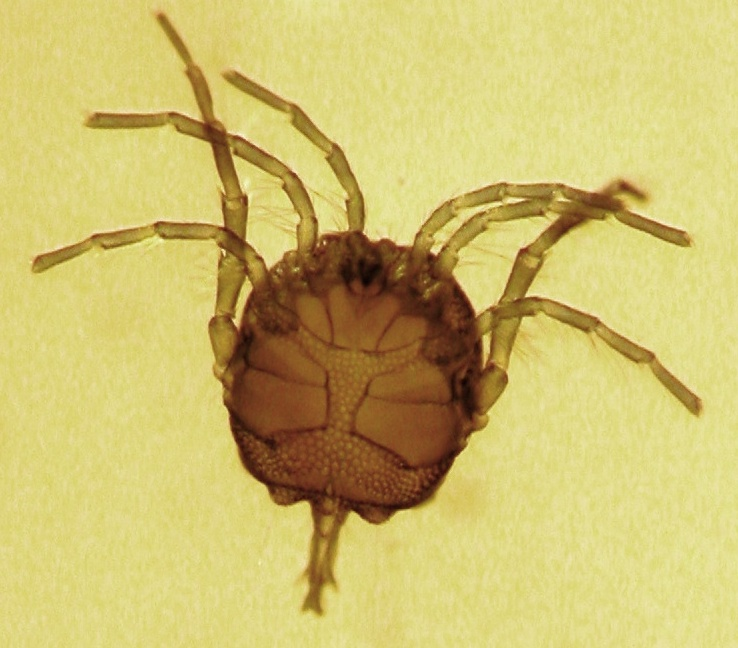
- Arrenurus berolinensis, Protz 1896
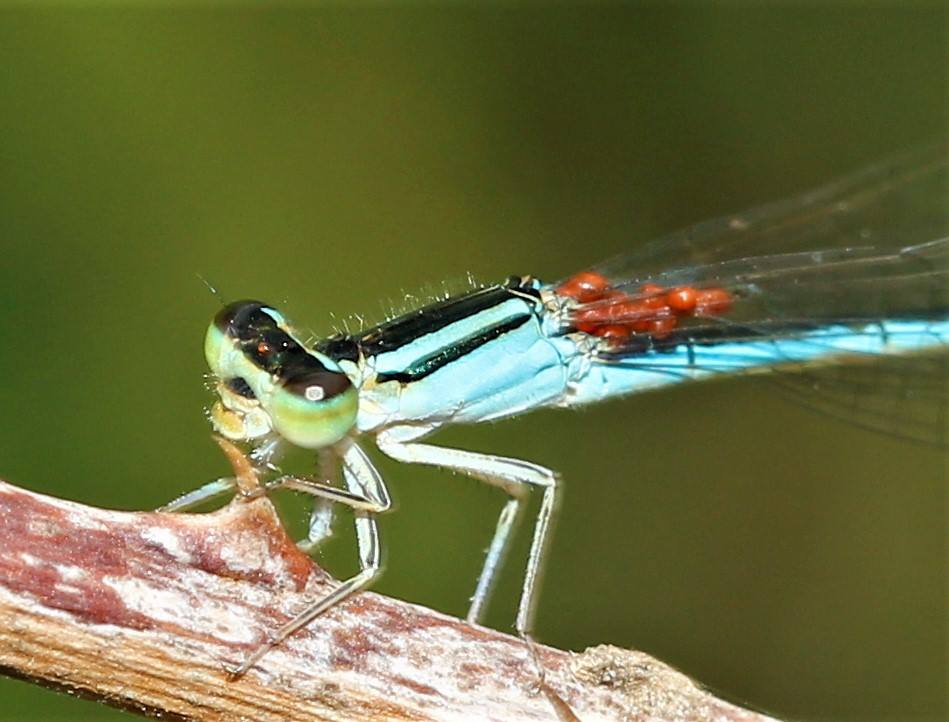
- Arrenurus on Africallagma glaucum

Scientific classification
- Domain: Eukaryota
- Kingdom: Animalia
- Phylum: Arthropoda
- Subphylum: Chelicerata
- Class: Arachnida
- Order: Trombidiformes
- Family: Arrenuridae
- Genus: Arrenurus; Dugès, 1834

= Arrenurus =

Genus of mites

Arrenurus (αρρεν - male, ουρά - tail) is a genus of water mites within the family Arrenuridae, and was first described by Antoine Louis Dugès in 1834. It has a cosmopolitan distribution in lentic waters, even on remote Pacific islands, and is found on every continent, with the possible exception of Antarctica. Some 950 species are currently recognised, making Arrenurus the largest of genera.

Arrenurus goes through seven stages - egg, inactive prelarva, larva, protonymph, deutonymph, tritonymph, and adult, only the larval stage being parasitic, and marked sexual dimorphism in the heavily sclerotised adults. Taxonomy of females is often problematic, but relatively simple in the males. Arrenurus larvae are ectoparasites of some aquatic insects in freshwater habitats, particularly the Odonata (Dragonflies and Damselflies). These mites establish an association for the purpose of transportation and nutrients, and attach to the host during the host's transition from larva to adult. Andrew et al. 2012, found that it is mainly Arrenurus species that are to be found on Odonata. Studies also show that parasitism by the mites affect the host's longevity and fecundity by draining its tissue fluids, hampering copulation and interfering with sperm transfer. Arrenurus larvae are also ectoparasites of Diptera and Coleoptera.

After the odonate has left the water and shed its skin, mites move from the exuviae onto the still soft adult. They often select the ventral parts of the thorax or abdomen, and to a lesser extent are found on the back or on the head, or on the major wing veins. After penetrating the dermis of the host, the larval mite produces a stylostome, or small blind sac, within the host's body. Most stylostomes are able to resist assault by the host's immune system, such action consisting of initial hemolymph clotting, and deposition of melanin around the sac and its encapsulation. Feeding from the host is only one of the aims - the other is phoresy or using the host for transportation. Many mites are phoretic - the benefits being dispersal, fresh habitat, and expanding the gene pool.
