= Hydrachnidae =

Scientific classification
- Domain: Eukaryota
- Kingdom: Animalia
- Phylum: Arthropoda
- Subphylum: Chelicerata
- Class: Arachnida
- Order: Trombidiformes
- Superfamily: Hydrachnoidea
- Family: Hydrachnidae; Leach, 1815

Genera
- See text

Order of mites

Hydrachnidae is a family of mites in the superfamily Hydrachnoidea, first defined by William Elford Leach.

== Description ==
The family was defined within Hydrachnoidea. These mites may be brilliant red or orange in colour, unusual among freshwater invertebrates

== Taxonomy ==
The family includes the following genera:

- Hydrachna
