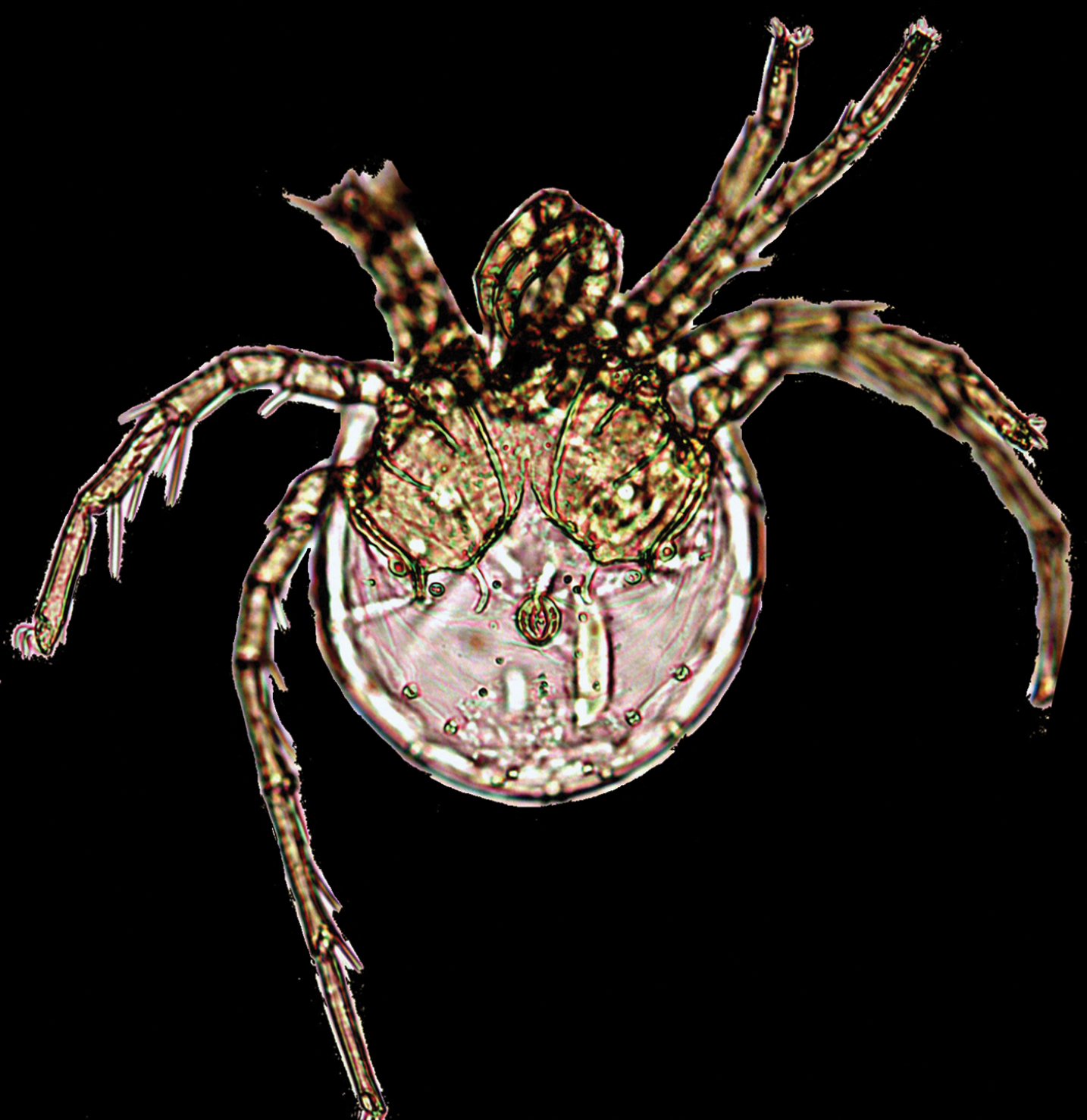
- Pontarachnidae

Scientific classification
- Kingdom: Animalia
- Phylum: Arthropoda
- Subphylum: Chelicerata
- Class: Arachnida
- Order: Trombidiformes
- Family: Pontarachnidae

= Pontarachnidae =

Family of trombidiform mites

Pontarachnidae is a family of mites belonging to the order Trombidiformes.

Genera:

- Litarachna Walter, 1925
- Paralitarachna Cook, 1958
- Pontarachna Philippi, 1840
