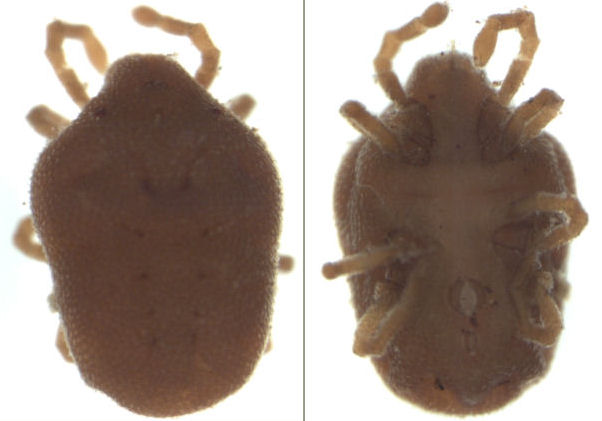
- Calyptostoma

Scientific classification
- Domain: Eukaryota
- Kingdom: Animalia
- Phylum: Arthropoda
- Subphylum: Chelicerata
- Class: Arachnida
- Order: Trombidiformes
- Family: Calyptostomatidae
- Genus: Calyptostoma; Cambridge, 1875

= Calyptostoma =

Genus of mites

Calyptostoma is a genus of mites in the family Calyptostomatidae. There are about six described species in Calyptostoma.

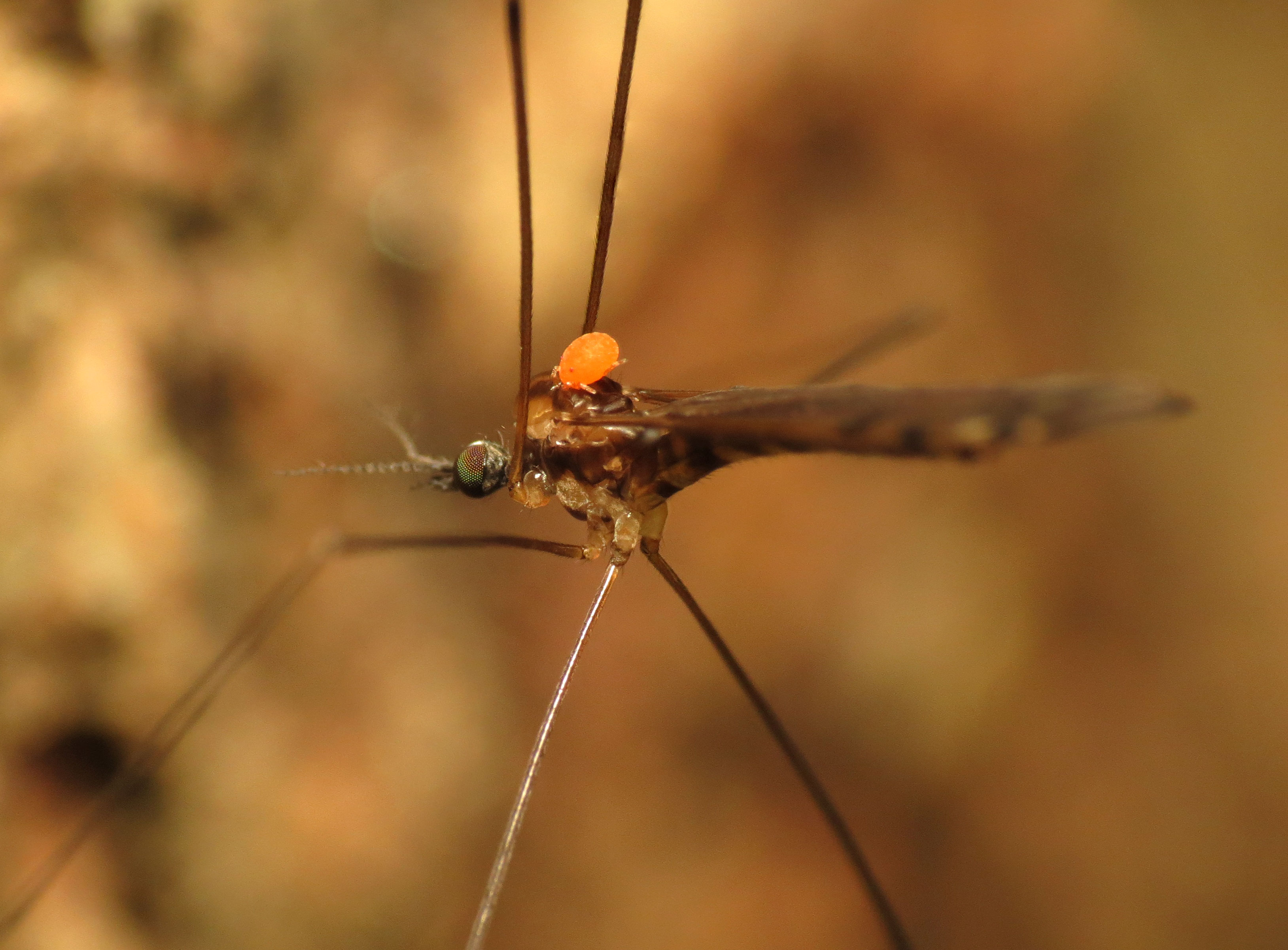
Cranefly with Mite

== Species ==
These six species belong to the genus Calyptostoma:

- Calyptostoma giuliae Haitlinger & Šundić, 2015
- Calyptostoma gorganica Saboori & Soukhstaraii, 2012
- Calyptostoma latiseta Shiba, 1976
- Calyptostoma marantica Haitlinger & Šundić, 2015
- Calyptostoma simplexa Shiba, 1976
- Calyptostoma velutinum (Müller, 1776)
