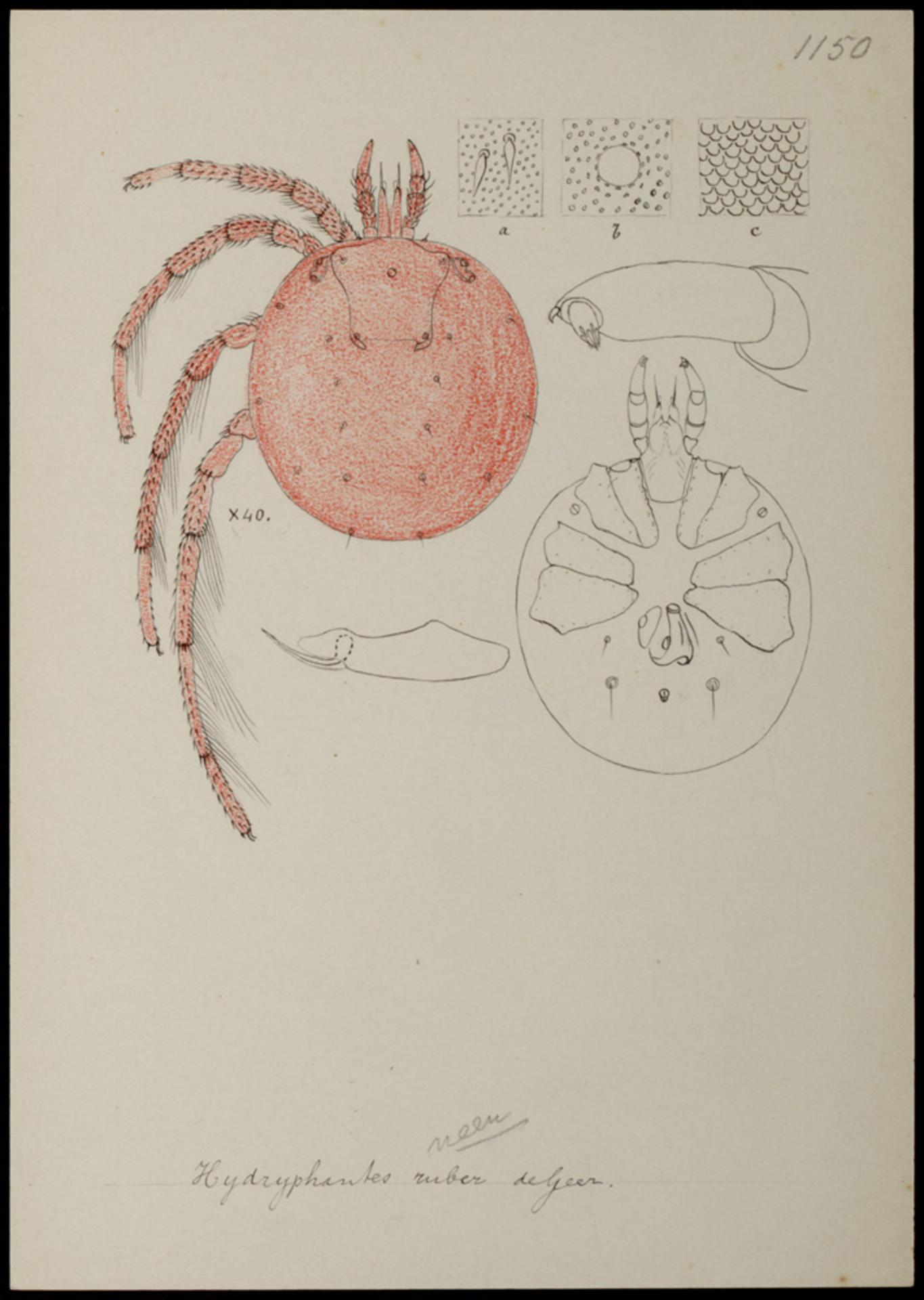
- Hydryphantes

Scientific classification
- Kingdom: Animalia
- Phylum: Arthropoda
- Subphylum: Chelicerata
- Class: Arachnida
- Order: Trombidiformes
- Suborder: Prostigmata
- Family: Hydryphantidae

= Hydryphantidae =

Family of mites

Hydryphantidae is a family of mites in the order Trombidiformes. There are more than 30 genera and 130 described species in Hydryphantidae.

== Genera ==
These 37 genera belong to the family Hydryphantidae:

- Almuerzothyas Goldschmidt & Gerecke, 2003
- Amerothyasella Smith & Cook, 1999
- Ankelothyas Besch, 1964
- Chimerathyas Mitchell, 2003
- Cowichania Smith, 1983
- Cyclohydryphantes Lundblad, 1941
- Cyclothyas Lundblad, 1941
- Dacothyas Motas, 1959
- Eupatrella Walter, 1935
- Euwandesia André & Naudo, 1962
- Georgella Koenike, 1907
- Hydryphantes C. L. Koch, 1841
- Ignacarus Gerecke, 1999
- Iranothyas Bader, 1984
- Japonothyas Imamura & Mitchell, 1967
- Javathyas Viets, 1929
- Kazakhithyas Smit, 2016
- Mamersa Koenike, 1898
- Neocalonyx Walter, 1919
- Notopanisus Besch, 1964
- Panisellus Viets, 1925
- Panisopsis Viets, 1926
- Panisus Koenike, 1896
- Parathyas Lundblad, 1926
- Parathyasella Viets, 1949
- Partnunia Piersig, 1896
- Placothyas Lundblad, 1926
- Protzia Piersig, 1896
- Protziella Lundblad, 1934
- Pseudothyas Thor, 1899
- Setodiscophrya Jankowski, 1981
- Sindacoides Bader, 1992
- Tadjikothyas Sokolow, 1948
- Tartarothyas Viets, 1934
- Thyasella Viets, 1926
- Trihothyas Lundblad, 1934
- Vietsia Lundblad, 1926
