= Trombidium southcotti =

Scientific classification
- Domain: Eukaryota
- Kingdom: Animalia
- Phylum: Arthropoda
- Subphylum: Chelicerata
- Class: Arachnida
- Order: Trombidiformes
- Family: Trombidiidae
- Genus: Trombidium
- Species: T. southcotti

Binomial name
- Trombidium southcotti Zhang & Saboori, 1996

Species of mite

Trombidium southcotti is a species of mite in the genus Trombidium in the family Trombidiidae. It is found in Iran.

== Name ==
The species is named in honor of doctor and scientist Ronald Vernon Southcott (1918–1998), who described another species in the same genus, T. breei.
