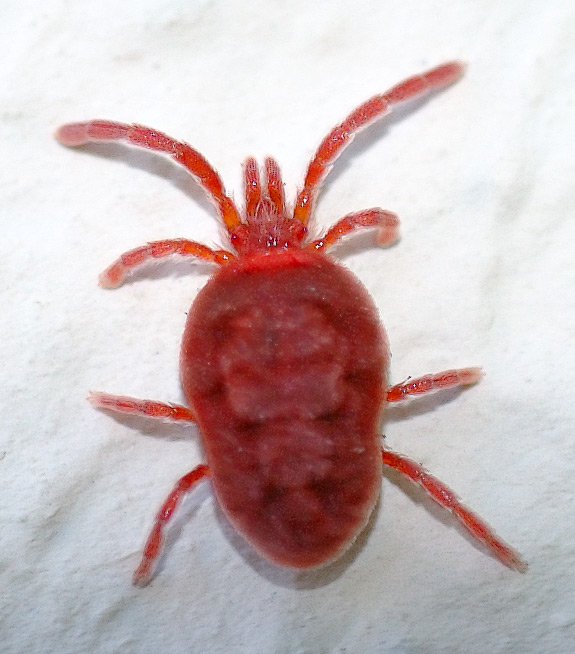
- Trombidium holosericeum (Trombidiformes: Trombidiidae)

Scientific classification
- Kingdom: Animalia
- Phylum: Arthropoda
- Subphylum: Chelicerata
- Class: Arachnida
- Superorder: Acariformes; Zakhvatkin, 1952

Clades and orders
- Endeostigmata (probably paraphyletic); Eriophyoidea; Sarcoptiformes; Astigmatina; Oribatida; Trombidiformes; Prostigmata; Sphaerolichida

= Acariformes =

Acariformes Temporal range: Devonian–present

Superorder of mite

The Acariformes, also known as the Actinotrichida, are the more diverse of the two superorders of mites, alongside Parasitiformes. Over 32,000 described species are found in 351 families, with an estimated total of 440,000 to 929,000 species, including undescribed species.

== Systematics and taxonomy ==
The Acariformes can be divided into two main clades – Sarcoptiformes and Trombidiformes. In addition, a paraphyletic group containing primitive forms, the Endeostigmata, was formerly also considered distinct. The latter is composed of only 10 families of little-studied, minute, soft-bodied mites that ingest solid food, such as fungi, algae, and soft-bodied invertebrates such as nematodes, rotifers, and tardigrades. These clades were formerly considered suborders, but this does not allow for a sufficiently precise classification of the mites and is abolished in more modern treatments; the Endeostigmata are variously considered to form a suborder on their own (the old view) or are included mainly in the Sarcoptiformes, thus making both groups monophyletic. The superfamily Eriophyoidea, traditionally considered members of the Trombidiformes, have been found to be sister to the clade containing Sarcoptiformes and Trombidiformes.

Another group often mentioned is the Actinedida, but in treatments like the present one, this is split up between the Sarcoptiformes (and formerly the separate Endeostigmata) and Trombidiformes (which contains the bulk of the "Actinedida"), because it appears to be a massively paraphyletic "wastebin taxon", uniting all Acariformes that are not "typical" Oribatida and Astigmatina. The Trombidiformes present their own problems. The small group Sphaerolichida appears to be the most ancient lineage among them. However, the Prostigmata are variously subdivided into the Anystina and Eleutherengona, and Eupodina. The delimitation and interrelationships of these groups are entirely unclear; while most analyses find one of the latter two, but not the other to be a subgroup of the Anystina; neither of these mutually contradicting hypotheses is very robust; possibly this is a simple error because phylogenetic software usually fails in handling nondichotomous phylogenies. Consequently, it may be best for the time being to consider each of the three main prostigmatan lineages to be equally distinct from the other two.

== Fossil record ==
The oldest fossils of acariform mites are from the Rhynie Chert, Scotland, which dates to the early Devonian, around 410 million years ago The Cretaceous Immensmaris chewbaccei had idiosoma of more than 8 mm (0.31 in) in length and was the largest fossil acariform mite and also the largest erythraeoid mite ever recorded.

== Diversity ==
The Sarcoptiformes ingest solid food, being mainly microherbivores, fungivores and detritivores. Some Astigmatina – the Psoroptidia – have become associated with vertebrates and nest-building insects. These include the well known house dust mites, scab mites and mange mites, stored product mites, feather mites and some fur mites. The relationships between their main groups are not well-resolved and subject to revision. In particular it appears as if the Oribatida need to be split up in two, as the Astigmatina are closer to some of them (e.g. certain Desmonomata) than the latter are to other "Oribatida".

The Trombidiformes are most noted for the economic damage caused by many plant parasite species. All of the most important plant pests among the Acari are trombidiformans, such as spider mites (Tetranychidae) and Eriophyidae. Many species are also predators, fungivores, and animal parasites. Some of the most conspicuous species of free-living mites are the relatively large and bright red velvet mites, that belong to the family Trombidiidae.

Oribatid mites and to a much lesser extent others are a source of alkaloids in poison frogs (namely small species like the strawberry poison-dart frog Oophaga pumilio). Such frogs raised without these oribatids in their diets do not develop the strong poisons associated with them in the wild.

== Parthenogenesis ==
Acariformes species appear to have evolved from a sexual ancestor and the primary manner of reproduction during the course of evolution has been sexual reproduction. However, within the super order Acariformes, parthenogenetic species have arisen numerous times during the course of evolution. In contrast to the commonly held view that parthenogenetic lineages are short lived, four species-rich parthenogenetic clusters of the order Oribatida are very ancient and likely arose 400–300 million years ago. In some parthenogenetic species that undergo automixis (a kind of self-fertilization that retains meiosis) sexual reproduction has re-emerged.

== Examples ==
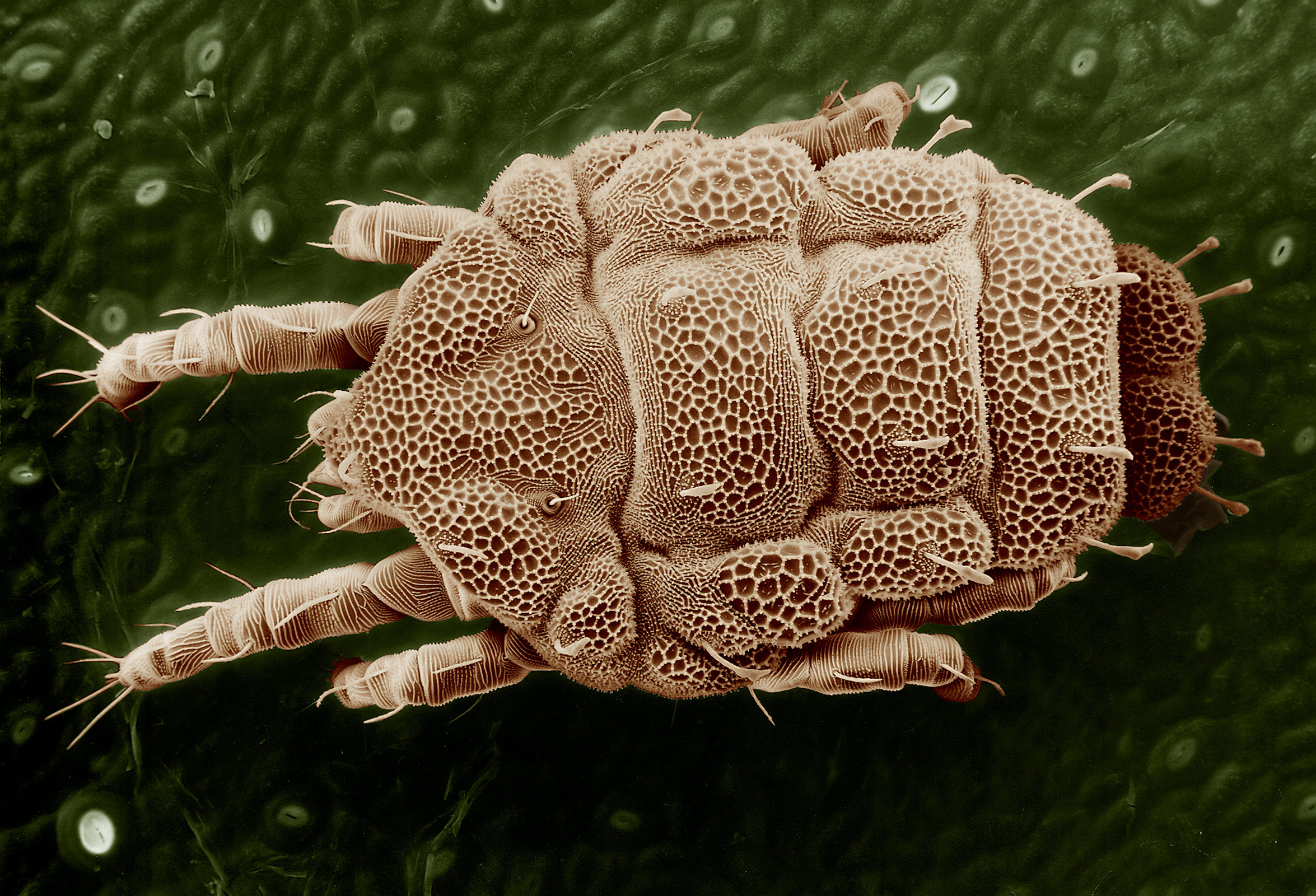
Lorryia formosa (Trombidiformes: Tydeidae)

Eriophyidae, plant parasites, e.g. Acalitus essigi (redberry mite)

Sarcoptiformes

- Cheese mites
- Epidermoptidae
- Gastronyssidae
- Sarcoptes scabiei

Trombidiformes

- Demodecidae, e.g. Demodex mites
- Erythraeidae
- Labidostommatidae
- Polydiscia deuterosminthurus
- Smarididae
- Spider mites, e.g. Tetranychus urticae
- Tarsonemidae, a number of which are plant pests, e.g. Acarapis woodi
- Tydeidae
