= Pronematus =

Scientific classification
- Domain: Eukaryota
- Kingdom: Animalia
- Phylum: Arthropoda
- Subphylum: Chelicerata
- Class: Arachnida
- Order: Trombidiformes
- Family: Tydeidae
- Genus: Pronematus; Canestrini, 1886

Genus of mites

Pronematus is a genus of mites belonging to the family Tydeidae. These mites are similar to Tydeus spp but can be distinguished by the lack of any claws on the first pair of legs.

== Species ==
Species include:

- Pronematus bonatii
- Pronematus davisi
- Pronematus mcgregori
- Pronematus pruni
- Pronematus sextoni
- Pronematus testatus
- Pronematus ubiquitus
- Pronematus vandykei
