= Trombidium teres =

Scientific classification
- Domain: Eukaryota
- Kingdom: Animalia
- Phylum: Arthropoda
- Subphylum: Chelicerata
- Class: Arachnida
- Order: Trombidiformes
- Family: Trombidiidae
- Genus: Trombidium
- Species: T. teres

Binomial name
- Trombidium teres (André, 1928)

Synonyms
- Parathrombidium teres

Species of mite

Trombidium teres is a species of mite in the genus Trombidium in the family Trombidiidae. It is found in France.
