= Trombidium mediterraneum =

Scientific classification
- Domain: Eukaryota
- Kingdom: Animalia
- Phylum: Arthropoda
- Subphylum: Chelicerata
- Class: Arachnida
- Order: Trombidiformes
- Family: Trombidiidae
- Genus: Trombidium
- Species: T. mediterraneum

Binomial name
- Trombidium mediterraneum (Berlese, 1910)

Synonyms
- Sericothrombium mediterraneum

Species of mite

Trombidium mediterraneum is a species of mite in the genus Trombidium in the family Trombidiidae. It is found in Europe and Algeria.
