= Trombidium mastigotarsum =

Scientific classification
- Domain: Eukaryota
- Kingdom: Animalia
- Phylum: Arthropoda
- Subphylum: Chelicerata
- Class: Arachnida
- Order: Trombidiformes
- Family: Trombidiidae
- Genus: Trombidium
- Species: T. mastigotarsum

Binomial name
- Trombidium mastigotarsum (Feider, 1956)

Synonyms
- Teresothrombium mastigotarsum

Species of mite

Trombidium mastigotarsum is a species of mite in the genus Trombidium in the family Trombidiidae. It is found in Romania.

== Name ==
The name is derived from Ancient Greek mastix "whip" and tarsus "ankle".
