= Trombidium kneissli =

Scientific classification
- Domain: Eukaryota
- Kingdom: Animalia
- Phylum: Arthropoda
- Subphylum: Chelicerata
- Class: Arachnida
- Order: Trombidiformes
- Family: Trombidiidae
- Genus: Trombidium
- Species: T. kneissli

Binomial name
- Trombidium kneissli (Krausse, 1915)

Synonyms
- Sericothrombium kneissli

Species of mite

Trombidium kneissli is a species of mite in the genus Trombidium in the family Trombidiidae. It is found in Europe.

== Name ==
The species is named in honor of the priest Ludwig Kneißl, whose mite collection can be found in Zoologische Staatssammlung München.
