= Trombidium poriceps =

Scientific classification
- Domain: Eukaryota
- Kingdom: Animalia
- Phylum: Arthropoda
- Subphylum: Chelicerata
- Class: Arachnida
- Order: Trombidiformes
- Family: Trombidiidae
- Genus: Trombidium
- Species: T. poriceps

Binomial name
- Trombidium poriceps (Oudemans, 1904)

Synonyms
- Thrombidium poriceps

Species of mite

Trombidium poriceps is a species of mite in the genus Trombidium in the family Trombidiidae. It is found in Europe.

== Name ==
The species name is derived from Latin porus "pore" and caput "head".
