= Trombidium susteri =

Scientific classification
- Domain: Eukaryota
- Kingdom: Animalia
- Phylum: Arthropoda
- Subphylum: Chelicerata
- Class: Arachnida
- Order: Trombidiformes
- Family: Trombidiidae
- Genus: Trombidium
- Species: T. susteri

Binomial name
- Trombidium susteri (Feider, 1956)

Synonyms
- Teresothrombium susteri

Species of mite

Trombidium susteri is a species of mite in the genus Trombidium in the family Trombidiidae. It is found in Germany and Romania.

== Name ==
This species is named in honor of Dipterologist Petre Şuster (1896–1954).
