= Allothrombium polikarpi =

Scientific classification
- Kingdom: Animalia
- Phylum: Arthropoda
- Subphylum: Chelicerata
- Class: Arachnida
- Order: Trombidiformes
- Family: Trombidiidae
- Genus: Allothrombium
- Species: A. polikarpi

Binomial name
- Allothrombium polikarpi Haitlinger, 2006

Species of mite

Allothrombium polikarpi is a species of mite belonging to the family Trombidiidae, first described from Greece.
