= Trombidium rowmundi =

Scientific classification
- Domain: Eukaryota
- Kingdom: Animalia
- Phylum: Arthropoda
- Subphylum: Chelicerata
- Class: Arachnida
- Order: Trombidiformes
- Family: Trombidiidae
- Genus: Trombidium
- Species: T. rowmundi

Binomial name
- Trombidium rowmundi Haitlinger, 1996

Species of mite

Trombidium rowmundi is a species of mite in the genus Trombidium in the family Trombidiidae. It is found in Poland. The larvae of this species use spiders as a host.
