= Trombidium hungaricum =

Scientific classification
- Domain: Eukaryota
- Kingdom: Animalia
- Phylum: Arthropoda
- Subphylum: Chelicerata
- Class: Arachnida
- Order: Trombidiformes
- Family: Trombidiidae
- Genus: Trombidium
- Species: T. hungaricum

Binomial name
- Trombidium hungaricum Kobulej, 1957

Species of mite

Trombidium hungaricum is a species of mites in the genus Trombidium in the family Trombidiidae. It is found in Hungary.
