= Trombidium rhopalicus =

Scientific classification
- Kingdom: Animalia
- Phylum: Arthropoda
- Subphylum: Chelicerata
- Class: Arachnida
- Order: Trombidiformes
- Family: Trombidiidae
- Genus: Trombidium
- Species: T. rhopalicus

Binomial name
- Trombidium rhopalicus (Vercammen-Grandjean & Popp, 1967)

Synonyms
- Atomus rhopalicus

Species of mite

Trombidium rhopalicus is a species of mite in the genus Trombidium in the family Trombidiidae. It is found in Germany. The larvae of this species are ectoparasites on the pteromalid wasp Rhopalicus tutela, which itself is a parasite of bark beetles.
