= Tydeus grabouwi =

Scientific classification
- Domain: Eukaryota
- Kingdom: Animalia
- Phylum: Arthropoda
- Subphylum: Chelicerata
- Class: Arachnida
- Order: Trombidiformes
- Family: Tydeidae
- Genus: Tydeus
- Species: T. grabouwi

Binomial name
- Tydeus grabouwi Meyer & Ryke, 1959

Species of mite

Tydeus grabouwi is a species of mite belonging to the family Tydeidae. This oval, eyeless mite is around 400 μm in length with a soft body covered in striations. All the legs are shorter in length than the body. It has been recorded from a wide range of plants in South Africa.
