= Pronematus pruni =

Scientific classification
- Domain: Eukaryota
- Kingdom: Animalia
- Phylum: Arthropoda
- Subphylum: Chelicerata
- Class: Arachnida
- Order: Trombidiformes
- Family: Tydeidae
- Genus: Pronematus
- Species: P. pruni

Binomial name
- Pronematus pruni Meyer & Ryke, 1959

Species of mite

Pronematus pruni is a species of mite belonging to the family Tydeidae. This small oval mite is around 300 μm in length with a smooth body and legs much shorter than the body. It has been recorded on Prunus domestica and Psidium guajava in the vicinity of Potchefstroom, South Africa.
