= Trombidium hyperi =

Scientific classification
- Kingdom: Animalia
- Phylum: Arthropoda
- Subphylum: Chelicerata
- Class: Arachnida
- Order: Trombidiformes
- Family: Trombidiidae
- Genus: Trombidium
- Species: T. hyperi

Binomial name
- Trombidium hyperi Vercammen-Grandjean, Van Driesche & Gyrisco, 1977

Species of mite

Trombidium hyperi is a species of mite in the genus Trombidium in the family Trombidiidae. It is found in New York, USA.

Like T. auroraense, the larvae are ectoparasites on adult alfalfa weevils (Hypera postica).
