= Trombidium monoeciportuense =

Scientific classification
- Domain: Eukaryota
- Kingdom: Animalia
- Phylum: Arthropoda
- Subphylum: Chelicerata
- Class: Arachnida
- Order: Trombidiformes
- Family: Trombidiidae
- Genus: Trombidium
- Species: T. monoeciportuense

Binomial name
- Trombidium monoeciportuense (André, 1928)

Synonyms
- Sericothrombium monoeciportuense

Species of mite

Trombidium monoeciportuense is a species of mite in the genus Trombidium in the family Trombidiidae. It is found in the Czech Republic and Monaco.
