= Trombidium auroraense =

Scientific classification
- Domain: Eukaryota
- Kingdom: Animalia
- Phylum: Arthropoda
- Subphylum: Chelicerata
- Class: Arachnida
- Order: Trombidiformes
- Family: Trombidiidae
- Genus: Trombidium
- Species: T. auroraense

Binomial name
- Trombidium auroraense Vercammen-Grandjean, Van Driesche & Gyrisco, 1977

Species of mite

Trombidium auroraense is a species of mite in the genus Trombidium in the family Trombidiidae. It is found in New York, United States.

Like T. hyperi, the larvae are ectoparasites on adult alfalfa weevils (Hypera postica).

== Name ==
The species name is derived from Latin aurora "dawn".
