= Trombidium latum =

Scientific classification
- Domain: Eukaryota
- Kingdom: Animalia
- Phylum: Arthropoda
- Subphylum: Chelicerata
- Class: Arachnida
- Order: Trombidiformes
- Family: Trombidiidae
- Genus: Trombidium
- Species: T. latum

Binomial name
- Trombidium latum C. L. Koch, 1837

Species of mite

Trombidium latum is a species of mite in the genus Trombidium in the family Trombidiidae. It is found in Europe.

== Name ==
The species name is derived from Latin latus "wide, broad".
