= Ljania =

Scientific classification
- Domain: Eukaryota
- Kingdom: Animalia
- Phylum: Arthropoda
- Subphylum: Chelicerata
- Class: Arachnida
- Order: Trombidiformes
- Family: Axonopsidae
- Genus: Ljania; Thor, 1898

Genus of spiders

Ljania is a genus of mites belonging to the family Axonopsidae.

The species of this genus are found in Europe and Northern America.

Species:

- Ljania bipapillata Thor, 1898
- Ljania longissima Schwoerbel, 1962
