= Trombidium raeticum =

Scientific classification
- Kingdom: Animalia
- Phylum: Arthropoda
- Subphylum: Chelicerata
- Class: Arachnida
- Order: Trombidiformes
- Family: Trombidiidae
- Genus: Trombidium
- Species: T. raeticum

Binomial name
- Trombidium raeticum Schweizer & Bader, 1963

Species of mite

Trombidium raeticum is a species of mite in the genus Trombidium in the family Trombidiidae. It is found in Switzerland.

== Name ==
The species name refers to the ancient region of Raetia, which includes modern Switzerland.
