= Trombidium geniculatum =

Scientific classification
- Domain: Eukaryota
- Kingdom: Animalia
- Phylum: Arthropoda
- Subphylum: Chelicerata
- Class: Arachnida
- Order: Trombidiformes
- Family: Trombidiidae
- Genus: Trombidium
- Species: T. geniculatum

Binomial name
- Trombidium geniculatum (Feider, 1955)

Synonyms
- Teresothrombium geniculatum

Species of mite

Trombidium geniculatum is a species of mite in the genus Trombidium in the family Trombidiidae. It is found in Spain, Romania, Poland and Norway.

== Name ==
The species name is derived from Latin genicula "knee".
