= Trombidium cancelai =

Scientific classification
- Domain: Eukaryota
- Kingdom: Animalia
- Phylum: Arthropoda
- Subphylum: Chelicerata
- Class: Arachnida
- Order: Trombidiformes
- Family: Trombidiidae
- Genus: Trombidium
- Species: T. cancelai

Binomial name
- Trombidium cancelai (Robaux, 1967)

Synonyms
- Thrombidium cancelai

Species of mite

Trombidium cancelai is a species of mite in the genus Trombidium in the family Trombidiidae. It is found in Spain.
