= Trombidium parasiticus =

Scientific classification
- Domain: Eukaryota
- Kingdom: Animalia
- Phylum: Arthropoda
- Subphylum: Chelicerata
- Class: Arachnida
- Order: Trombidiformes
- Family: Trombidiidae
- Genus: Trombidium
- Species: T. parasiticus

Binomial name
- Trombidium parasiticus (de Geer, 1778)

Synonyms
- Acarus parasiticus

Species of mite

Trombidium parasiticus is a species of mite in the genus Trombidium in the family Trombidiidae. It is found in Sweden.
