= Dinothrombium pandorae =

Conservation status
- Vulnerable (NatureServe)

Scientific classification
- Kingdom: Animalia
- Phylum: Arthropoda
- Subphylum: Chelicerata
- Class: Arachnida
- Order: Trombidiformes
- Family: Trombidiidae
- Genus: Dinothrombium
- Species: D. pandorae

Binomial name
- Dinothrombium pandorae Newell & Tevis, 1960

Synonyms
- Dinothrombium tinctorum Angelothrombium pandorae

Species of velvet mite

Dinothrombium pandorae, also known as an angelita or a rain bug, is a giant red velvet mite found in the Southern California desert. This species usually emerges after rains. The larva eat grasshoppers, the adults eat termites.
