= Trombidium brevimanum =

Scientific classification
- Domain: Eukaryota
- Kingdom: Animalia
- Phylum: Arthropoda
- Subphylum: Chelicerata
- Class: Arachnida
- Order: Trombidiformes
- Family: Trombidiidae
- Genus: Trombidium
- Species: T. brevimanum

Binomial name
- Trombidium brevimanum (Berlese, 1910)

Synonyms
- Sericothrombium brevimanum

Species of mite

Trombidium brevimanum is a species of mite in the genus Trombidium in the family Trombidiidae. It is found in Europe.

== Name ==
The species name is combined from Latin brev- "short" and manus "hand".
