= Trombidium toldti =

Scientific classification
- Domain: Eukaryota
- Kingdom: Animalia
- Phylum: Arthropoda
- Subphylum: Chelicerata
- Class: Arachnida
- Order: Trombidiformes
- Family: Trombidiidae
- Genus: Trombidium
- Species: T. teres

Binomial name
- Trombidium teres (Methlagl, 1928)

Synonyms
- Metathrombidium toldti

Species of mite

Trombidium toldti is a species of mite in the genus Trombidium in the family Trombidiidae. It is found in Austria.

== Name ==
This species is named in honor of acarologist K. Toldt.
