= Trombidium clavipes =

Scientific classification
- Domain: Eukaryota
- Kingdom: Animalia
- Phylum: Arthropoda
- Subphylum: Chelicerata
- Class: Arachnida
- Order: Trombidiformes
- Family: Trombidiidae
- Genus: Trombidium
- Species: †T. clavipes

Binomial name
- †Trombidium clavipes Koch & Berendt, 1854

Extinct species of mite

Trombidium clavipes is a fossil species of mite in the genus Trombidium in the family Trombidiidae. It was found in Oligocene deposits.

== Name ==
The species name is derived from Latin clav- "club" and pes "foot".
