= Tydeus munsteri =

Scientific classification
- Kingdom: Animalia
- Phylum: Arthropoda
- Subphylum: Chelicerata
- Class: Arachnida
- Order: Trombidiformes
- Family: Tydeidae
- Genus: Tydeus
- Species: T. munsteri

Binomial name
- Tydeus munsteri Meyer & Ryke, 1959

Synonyms
- Erythraeus munsteri Meyer & Ryke, 1959

Species of mite

Tydeus munsteri is a species of mite belonging to the family Tydeidae. This very small oval, eyeless mite is around 250 μm in length with a soft body covered in striations. It has been recorded from various plants in the vicinity of Munster in South Africa including Citrus limonia, Erythrina afra and Psidium guajava.
