= Trombidium carpaticum =

Scientific classification
- Domain: Eukaryota
- Kingdom: Animalia
- Phylum: Arthropoda
- Subphylum: Chelicerata
- Class: Arachnida
- Order: Trombidiformes
- Family: Trombidiidae
- Genus: Trombidium
- Species: T. carpaticum

Binomial name
- Trombidium carpaticum (Feider, 1950)

Synonyms
- Sericothrombium dacicum

Species of mite

Trombidium carpaticum is a species of mite in the genus Trombidium in the family Trombidiidae. It is found in France and Romania.

== Name ==
The species name refers to the Carpathian Mountains.
