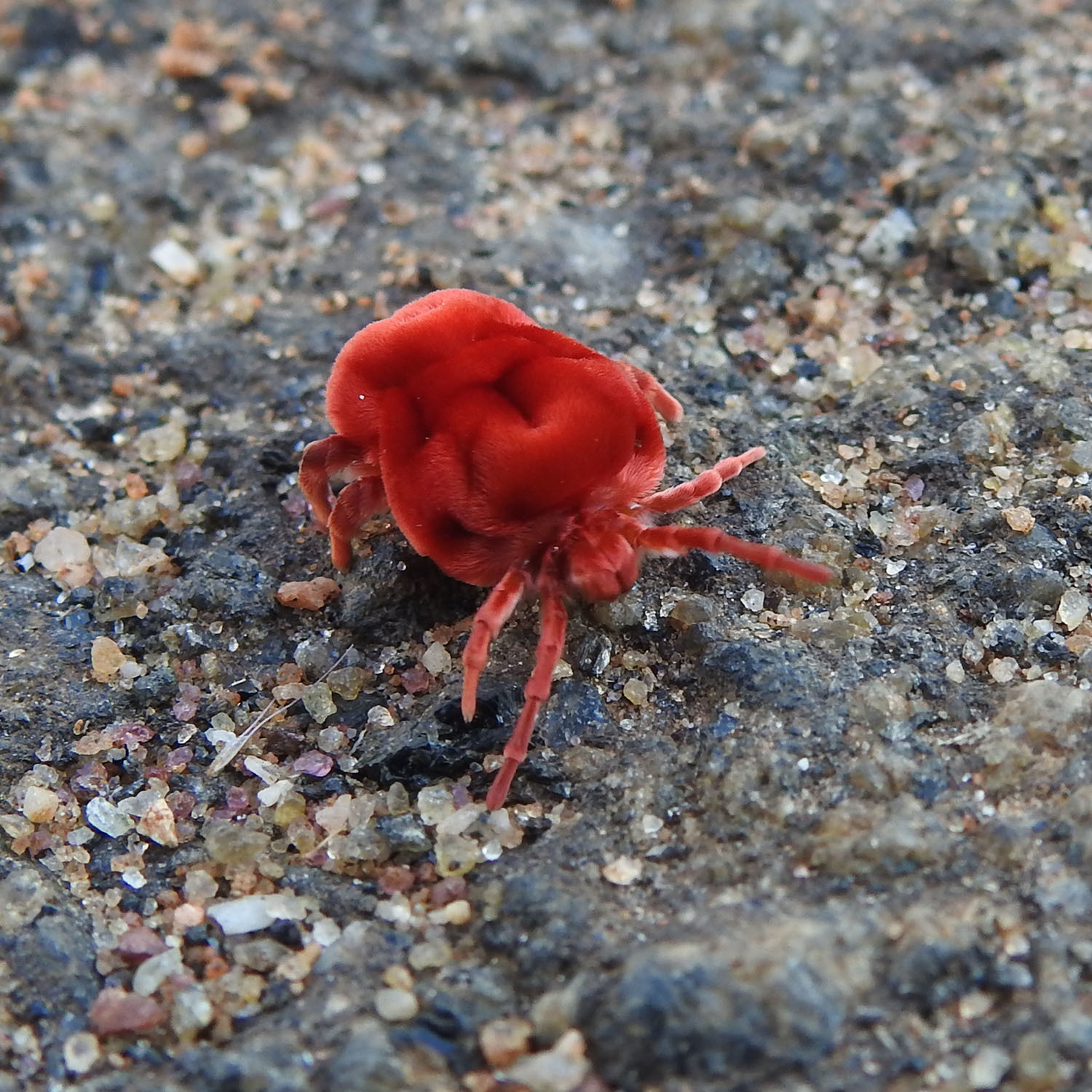

Scientific classification
- Domain: Eukaryota
- Kingdom: Animalia
- Phylum: Arthropoda
- Subphylum: Chelicerata
- Class: Arachnida
- Order: Trombidiformes
- Family: Trombidiidae
- Genus: Dinothrombium
- Species: D. gigas

Binomial name
- Dinothrombium gigas (Trouessart, 1894)

Synonyms
- Trombidium gigas

= Dinothrombium gigas =

Species of mite

Dinothrombium gigas is a species of red velvet mite described in 1894.
