= Sphaerolichus armipes =

Scientific classification
- Kingdom: Animalia
- Phylum: Arthropoda
- Subphylum: Chelicerata
- Class: Arachnida
- Order: Trombidiformes
- Family: Sphaerolichidae
- Genus: Sphaerolichus
- Species: S. armipes

Binomial name
- Sphaerolichus armipes Berlese, 1904

Species of mite

Sphaerolichus armipes is a mite species in the genus Sphaerolichus.
