= Trombidium meyeri =

Scientific classification
- Domain: Eukaryota
- Kingdom: Animalia
- Phylum: Arthropoda
- Subphylum: Chelicerata
- Class: Arachnida
- Order: Trombidiformes
- Family: Trombidiidae
- Genus: Trombidium
- Species: T. meyeri

Binomial name
- Trombidium meyeri (Krausse, 1916)

Synonyms
- Sericothrombium meyeri

Species of mite

Trombidium meyeri is a species of mite in the genus Trombidium in the family Trombidiidae. It is found in Europe.
