= Trombidium fuornum =

Scientific classification
- Domain: Eukaryota
- Kingdom: Animalia
- Phylum: Arthropoda
- Subphylum: Chelicerata
- Class: Arachnida
- Order: Trombidiformes
- Family: Trombidiidae
- Genus: Trombidium
- Species: T. fuornum

Binomial name
- Trombidium fuornum Schweizer, 1951

Species of mite

Trombidium fuornum is a species of mite in the genus Trombidium in the family Trombidiidae. It is found in Poland, Switzerland and France.
