= Tydeus eriophyes =

Scientific classification
- Domain: Eukaryota
- Kingdom: Animalia
- Phylum: Arthropoda
- Subphylum: Chelicerata
- Class: Arachnida
- Order: Trombidiformes
- Family: Tydeidae
- Genus: Tydeus
- Species: T. eriophyes

Binomial name
- Tydeus eriophyes Meyer & Ryke, 1959

Species of mite

Tydeus eriophyes is a species of mite belonging to the family Tydeidae. This small oval, eyeless mite is around 300 μm in length with a soft body covered in striations. It can be distinguished from similar species by the bluntly pointed, rod-like dorsal setae. This species is associated with the gall mite Eriophyes vitis on grapevines in the vicinity of Grabouw, South Africa.
