= Citrus yellow mite =

The common name citrus yellow mite may refer to any of the following species:

- Eotetranychus cendanai (Tetranychidae)
- Eotetranychus kankitus (Tetranychidae)
- Lorryia formosa (Tydeidae)
