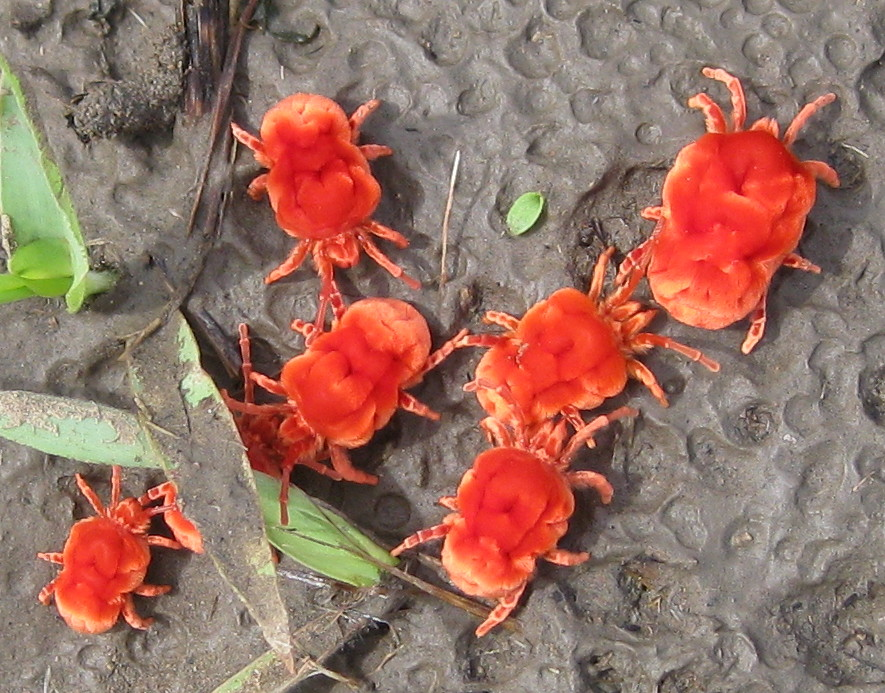
- Emerging after rain in Mozambique

Scientific classification
- Kingdom: Animalia
- Phylum: Arthropoda
- Subphylum: Chelicerata
- Class: Arachnida
- Order: Trombidiformes
- Family: Trombidiidae
- Genus: Dinothrombium; Oudemans, 1910

= Dinothrombium =

Genus of mites

Dinothrombium is a genus of mites belonging to the family Trombidiidae, which are commonly known as red velvet mites. As suggested by the name, Dinothrombium are covered in fine hairs and they are bright red, sometimes with markings in paler colors. Their bright colours appear to be aposematic, hinting at their unpleasant taste and smell. They are generally fairly large for their family and the African D. tinctorum, where adults typically are 12–14 mm (0.47–0.55 in), is one of the largest known species of red velvet mites (and the largest mites, if disregarding ticks engorged after feeding). Dinothrombium are found in all the world's continents, except Antarctica, often in dry areas, where they spend most of the time underground in the soil or sand, emerging after heavy rain. During this time, they can be conspicuous and numerous.

They are harmless to humans and regarded as beneficial because they feed on tiny arthropods and their eggs, including pest species.

== Species ==
The following species are recognised in the genus Dinothrombium:

- Dinothrombium brevipilum (Berlese, 1910)
- Dinothrombium colhuanum Vitzhum, 1933
- Dinothrombium corpulentum (Berlese, 1910)
- Dinothrombium crassipalpe (Trägårdh, 1904)
- Dinothrombium dammermani Vitzhum, 1926
- Dinothrombium dugesi (Trouessart, 1894)
- Dinothrombium eupectum (Leonardi, 1901)
- Dinothrombium gigas (Trouessart, 1894)
- Dinothrombium magnificum (LeConte, 1852)
- Dinothrombium oparbellae (André, 1949)
- Dinothrombium pandorae (Newell & Tevis, 1960)
- Dinothrombium pedioculatum (André, 1927)
- Dinothrombium superbum (Banks, 1910) (but as Paratrombium superbum in Mąkol& Wohltmann, 2012: 449).
- Dinothrombium tarsale (Berlese, 1916)
- Dinothrombium tinctorum (Linnaeus, 1767)
- Dinothrombium torridum Hirst, 1928
- Dinothrombium trispilum (Berlese, 1916)
- Dinothrombium zarniki (Krausse, 1916)

- The Australian Dinothrombium southcotti Fain, 1991 is revised as Clinotrombium southcotti Fain, 1991 in Mąkol 2007: 66, 173; See Mąkol, J. & Wohltmann, A. 2012: 449.
