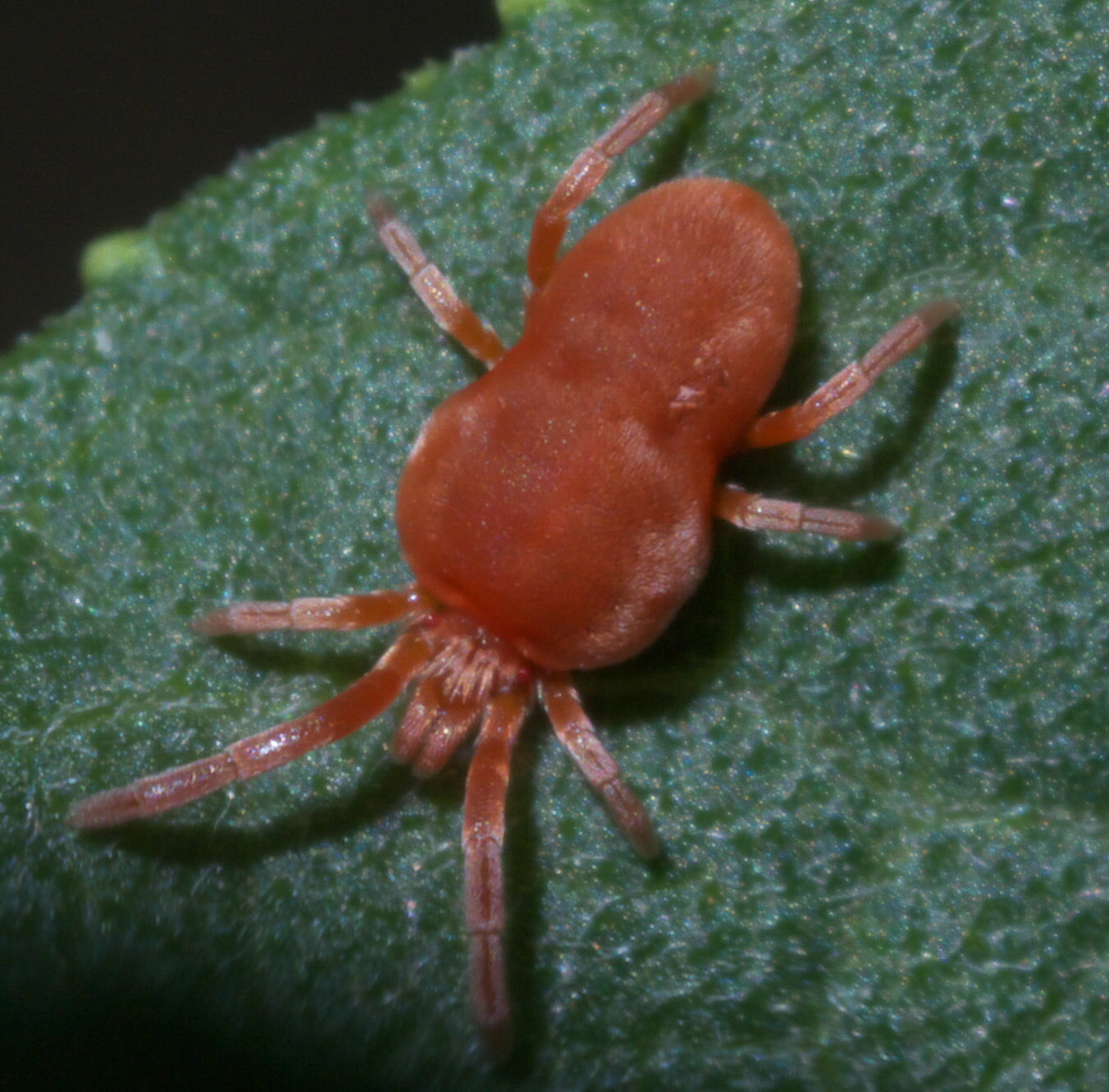
- Allothrombium sp.

Scientific classification
- Kingdom: Animalia
- Phylum: Arthropoda
- Subphylum: Chelicerata
- Class: Arachnida
- Order: Trombidiformes
- Family: Trombidiidae
- Genus: Allothrombium; Berlese, 1903

Species
- See text

= Allothrombium =

Genus of mites

Allothrombium is a genus of mites belonging to the family Trombidiidae.

== Species ==
The following species are accepted in the genus Allothrombium:

- Allothrombium adustum
- Allothrombium amiraeli
- Allothrombium angulatum
- Allothrombium athleticum
- Allothrombium chanaanense
- Allothrombium cincindelae
- Allothrombium clavatum
- Allothrombium crassicomum
- Allothrombium delamarei
- Allothrombium dipterae
- Allothrombium epiphyllus
- Allothrombium franklinimuelleri
- Allothrombium fuligineum
- Allothrombium gracile
- Allothrombium guttatum
- Allothrombium incarnatum
- Allothrombium insigne
- Allothrombium lawrencei
- Allothrombium lerouxi
- Allothrombium meridionale
- Allothrombium minutum
- Allothrombium mitchelli
- Allothrombium monochaetum
- Allothrombium monspessulanum
- Allothrombium mossi
- Allothrombium muscaparasiticae
- Allothrombium neapolitanum
- Allothrombium ornatum
- Allothrombium ovatum
- Allothrombium parvulum
- Allothrombium parvum
- Allothrombium pergrande
- Allothrombium polikarpi
- Allothrombium pulvinum
- Allothrombium reinholdi
- Allothrombium sericoideum
- Allothrombium shirazicum
- Allothrombium sicilianum
- Allothrombium simoni
- Allothrombium strigosum
- Allothrombium subtile
- Allothrombium tarsolatum
- Allothrombium tenuipes
- Allothrombium triticium
- Allothrombium trouessarti
- Allothrombium tuberculatum
- Allothrombium ursinum
- Allothrombium watanabei
- Allothrombium willmanni
- Allothrombium wolffi
- Allothrombium wolmari
