= Trombidium grandissimum =

Scientific classification
- Kingdom: Animalia
- Phylum: Arthropoda
- Subphylum: Chelicerata
- Class: Arachnida
- Order: Trombidiformes
- Family: Trombidiidae
- Genus: Trombidium
- Species: T. grandissimum

Binomial name
- Trombidium grandissimum L. Koch, 1867

Species of mite

Trombidium grandissimum, commonly known as the giant red velvet mite, is a species of mite in the genus Trombidium in the family Trombidiidae. This common mite is endemic to northern and central India, especially in the central plateau, and it primarily inhabits arid regions. T. grandissimum live on the ground and often hidden among soil, but is commonly seen during the rainy season or after recent rain events, and therefore (along with some other red velvet mite species) has the nickname of "rain bug".

== Description ==
Trombidium grandissimum is one of the largest species of red velvet mite, with adults typically being about 1.2 cm (0.5 in) long.

It is bright red and has a soft cushioning skin covered with fine hairs. A study of another species, the spider mite Tetranychus urticae, showed that the red color was caused by carotene, which was beneficial for their hibernation. T. grandissimum, belonging to the same order as spider mites, spend an extensive period of time in hibernation under the soil. This might be the reason why they also depend on red pigmentation, by which their haemolymph is usually coloured.

=== Microscopy ===
The mites were observed under stereo microscope for the detailed classification and analysis of different parts of their body, and structural samples were processed using ESEM and FESEM.

The FESEM images of the front leg sensilla hairs and claws at the tip usually measured around 500 μm. Stalked eyes pointed with white arrows measured around 1 mm. White arrows magnified by ESEM were measured around 400 μm. The red velvet skin is shown to be covered by sensitive hairs. The whole body hairs showing the branches and arrangement measured around 50 μm in size.

== Behavior ==
Trombidium grandissimum appears to be diurnal and will move into light, rather than darkness, if given the choice. They feed on tiny animal prey, like insects and their eggs. In the larval stage, T. grandissimum attach themselves to insects, most commonly crickets, and suck their fluids; they may occasionally even suck fluids from adults of their own species.

In their natural habitat, they were found to move on a horizontal plane. They seemed to be reluctant to climb up against the gravitational force which may be due to their bulky body size and shorter legs. They can easily wriggle their bodies through small openings and thus can easily get inside the burrows of ants and other insects to feed on their eggs. Males and females of Trombidiidae mites perform encircling dances, after which they pair for mating. A dead mite was found to be surrounded by ants, suggesting that they are non-toxic to other species and their cannibalistic nature suggests the same.

== Relationship with humans ==
T. grandissimum feed on insects and other mites, including species that are regarded as pests.

In their native range in India, they are gathered in large numbers when they emerge during prolonged rains. They are made into an oil-based traditional medicine that is said to be useful for a wide range of things, including immunity related diseases and paralysis. Research is being conduced to confirm or refute whether this oil has potential for pharmaceutical use.
