= Euschoengastia peromysci =

Scientific classification
- Kingdom: Animalia
- Phylum: Arthropoda
- Subphylum: Chelicerata
- Class: Arachnida
- Order: Trombidiformes
- Family: Trombiculidae
- Genus: Euschoengastia
- Species: E. peromysci

Binomial name
- Euschoengastia peromysci (Ewing, 1929)

Species of mite

Euschoengastia peromysci is a species of mite in the genus Euschoengastia of the family Trombiculidae. Recorded hosts include the cotton mouse (Peromyscus gossypinus) and marsh rice rat (Oryzomys palustris) in Georgia; the northern short-tailed shrew (Blarina brevicauda), northern red-backed vole (Myodes gapperi), northern flying squirrel (Glaucomys sabrinus), rock vole (Microtus chrotorrhinus), white-footed mouse (Peromyscus leucopus), and deermouse (Peromyscus maniculatus) in Tennessee; and northern red-backed vole, southern bog lemming (Synaptomys cooperi), masked shrew (Sorex cinereus), and eastern red squirrel (Tamiasciurus hudsonicus) in North Carolina, among others.

== See also ==
- List of parasites of the marsh rice rat

== Literature cited ==
- Reeves, W.K., Durden, L.A., Ritzi, C.M., Beckham, K.R., Super, P.E. and O'Connor, B.M. 2007. Ectoparasites and other ectosymbiotic arthropods of vertebrates in the Great Smoky Mountains National Park, USA (abstract only). Zootaxa 1392:31–68.
- Wilson, N. and Durden, L.A. 2003. Ectoparasites of terrestrial vertebrates inhabiting the Georgia Barrier Islands, USA: an inventory and preliminary biogeographical analysis (subscription required). Journal of Biogeography 30(8):1207–1220.
