= Euschoengastia =

Scientific classification
- Domain: Eukaryota
- Kingdom: Animalia
- Phylum: Arthropoda
- Subphylum: Chelicerata
- Class: Arachnida
- Order: Trombidiformes
- Family: Trombiculidae
- Genus: Euschoengastia; Ewing, 1938

Genus of mites

Euschoengastia is a genus of mites in the family Trombiculidae.

== Species ==
Species accepted by GBIF as of November 2024:

- Euschoengastia albecki Vercammen-Grandjean, 1965
- Euschoengastia alpina Sasa & Jameson, 1954
- Euschoengastia ambocalis Wrenn & Loomis, 1973
- Euschoengastia americana Ewing, 1938
- Euschoengastia ampliseta Loomis & Somerby, 1966
- Euschoengastia armata Schluger, 1960
- Euschoengastia barrerai Hoffmann, 1960
- Euschoengastia belgicae Brennan & Yunker, 1966
- Euschoengastia berlesei (Oudemans, 1903)
- Euschoengastia blarinae (Ewing, 1931)
- Euschoengastia brennani Wrenn & Loomis, 1974
- Euschoengastia campi Brown & Brennan, 1952
- Euschoengastia carolinensis Farrell, 1956
- Euschoengastia chisosensis Wrenn, Baccus & Loomis, 1976
- Euschoengastia citellicola Gould, 1956
- Euschoengastia colombiana Brennan, 1968
- Euschoengastia comata Audy, 1954
- Euschoengastia comosa Vercammen-Grandjean, Nadchatram & Traub, 1966
- Euschoengastia cordiremus Brennan, 1948
- Euschoengastia crateris Farrell, 1956
- Euschoengastia criceticola Brennan, 1948
- Euschoengastia decipiens Gould, 1956
- Euschoengastia diversa Farrell, 1956
- Euschoengastia donaldi Kepka, 1958
- Euschoengastia enemi Brennan & Jones, 1954
- Euschoengastia enhebra Brennan & Yunker, 1966
- Euschoengastia europaea Kolebinova, 1971
- Euschoengastia fasolla Brennan & Beck, 1955
- Euschoengastia floridaensis Abou-Taka & Comroy, 1995
- Euschoengastia frondifera Gould, 1956
- Euschoengastia fronterizae Wrenn, Baccus & Loomis, 1976
- Euschoengastia gilgiti Vercammen-Grandjean, Nadchatram & Traub, 1966
- Euschoengastia guntheri (Radford, 1942)
- Euschoengastia hamiltoni Brennan, 1947
- Euschoengastia hardyorum Wrenn & Somerby, 1974
- Euschoengastia heteromyicola Wrenn & Loomis, 1974
- Euschoengastia hoffmannae Gould, 1956
- Euschoengastia jamesoni (Brennan) Brennan
- Euschoengastia jiuzhiensis Yang, 1992
- Euschoengastia jonesi Lipovsky & Loomis, 1954
- Euschoengastia kalakunluna Shao & Wen, 1984
- Euschoengastia lanceolata Brennan & Beck, 1955
- Euschoengastia lanei Brennan & Beck, 1955
- Euschoengastia libertatis (Brennan & Dalmat, 1960)
- Euschoengastia luteodema Brennan, 1948
- Euschoengastia magna Farrell, 1956
- Euschoengastia marginalis Wrenn & Somerby, 1974
- Euschoengastia marmotae Farrell, 1956
- Euschoengastia maseri Wrenn, 1983
- Euschoengastia megastyrax Brennan & Jones, 1960
- Euschoengastia melomys (Womersley & Heaslip, 1943)
- Euschoengastia meshhedensis Kudryashova, Neronov & Farang-Azad, 1978
- Euschoengastia micheneri Gould, 1956
- Euschoengastia michiganensis Wrenn, 1974
- Euschoengastia multisetosa Loomis & Somerby, 1966
- Euschoengastia nihi Brennan & Jones, 1954
- Euschoengastia numerosa Wrenn & Loomis, 1974
- Euschoengastia nunezi (Hoffmann, 1944)
- Euschoengastia obesa Brennan & Beck, 1955
- Euschoengastia ohioensis Farrell, 1956
- Euschoengastia oregonensis (Ewing, 1929)
- Euschoengastia otophila Loomis & Brunnell, 1962
- Euschoengastia pamelae Brennan, 1968
- Euschoengastia peromysci (Ewing, 1929)
- Euschoengastia pipistrelli Brennan, 1947
- Euschoengastia pomerantzi Brennan & Jones, 1954
- Euschoengastia puerilis Gould, 1956
- Euschoengastia qilianensis Yang & Li, 1996
- Euschoengastia radfordi Brennan & Jones, 1954
- Euschoengastia romola Brennan & Jones, 1954
- Euschoengastia rotunda Brennan & Beck, 1955
- Euschoengastia rotundata (Schluger, 1955)
- Euschoengastia rubra Farrell, 1956
- Euschoengastia samboni (Radford, 1942)
- Euschoengastia sciuricola (Ewing, 1925)
- Euschoengastia setosa (Ewing, 1937)
- Euschoengastia simulans Wrenn & Loomis, 1974
- Euschoengastia soricinus Gould, 1956
- Euschoengastia spissa Brennan & Jones, 1961
- Euschoengastia staffordi Brennan & White, 1960
- Euschoengastia stephensi Loomis & Somerby, 1966
- Euschoengastia suzukii Takahashi, Fukaya & Takahashi, 2005
- Euschoengastia tanggulensis Ma, 2011
- Euschoengastia trigenuala Farrell, 1956
- Euschoengastia ulcerofaciens Daniel, 1957
- Euschoengastia ulcerofasciens Daniel, 1957
- Euschoengastia velata Brennan & Yunker, 1966
- Euschoengastia vulgaris Brennan & Jones, 1954
- Euschoengastia whitakeri Wrenn, 1984
- Euschoengastia zapoteca Hoffmann, 1965
