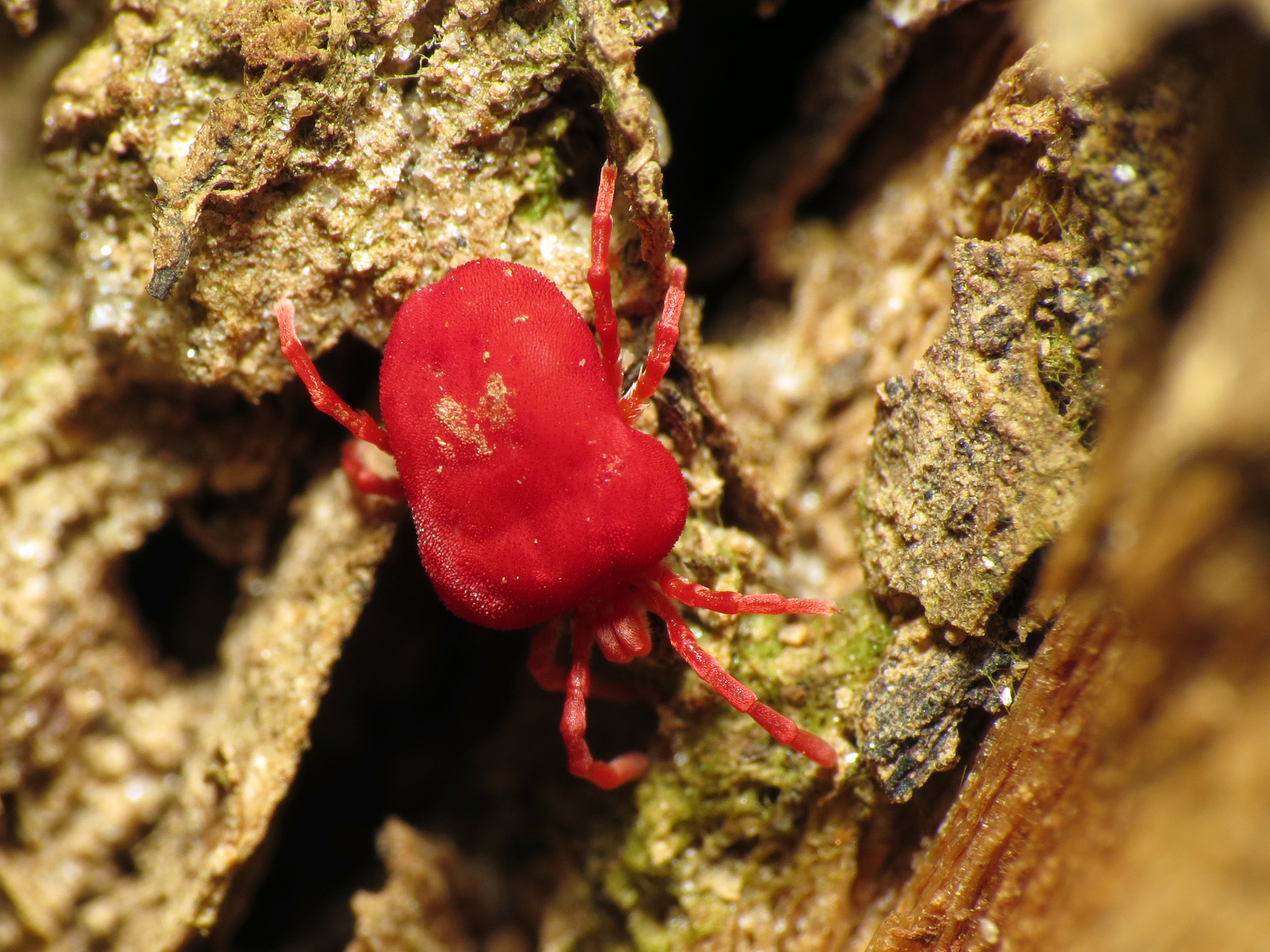

Scientific classification
- Domain: Eukaryota
- Kingdom: Animalia
- Phylum: Arthropoda
- Subphylum: Chelicerata
- Class: Arachnida
- Order: Trombidiformes
- Family: Trombidiidae
- Genus: Trombidium; Fabricius, 1775

Synonyms
- Atomus; Metathrombium; Thrombidium; Sericothrombium; Trombidion; Teresothrombium; Holothrombium

= Trombidium =

Trombidium Temporal range: Palaeogene–present

Genus of mites

Trombidium is a genus of mite with about 30 described species.

== Species ==
- Trombidium auroraense Vercammen-Grandjean, Van Driesche & Gyrisco, 1977 – New York
- Trombidium breei Southcott, 1986 – Europe (host: Agapetes galathea, Lepidoptera)
- Trombidium brevimanum (Berlese, 1910) – Europe
- Trombidium cancelai (Robaux, 1967) – Spain
- Trombidium carpaticum (Feider, 1950) – France, Romania
- † Trombidium clavipes Koch & Berendt, 1854 – Fossil: Oligocene
- Trombidium dacicum (Feider, 1950) – Poland, Romania
- Trombidium daunium (Paoli, 1937) – Italy
- Trombidium fturum Schweizer, 1951 – Spain, Switzerland
- Trombidium fuornum Schweizer, 1951 – Poland, Switzerland, France
- Trombidium geniculatum (Feider, 1955) – Spain, Romania, Poland, Norway
- Trombidium grandissimum (Koch, 1867) - India
- Trombidium heterotrichum (Berlese, 1910) – Europe
- Trombidium holosericeum (Linnaeus, 1758) – Palaearctic
- Trombidium hungaricum Kobulej, 1957 – Hungary
- Trombidium hyperi Vercammen-Grandjean, Van Driesche & Gyrisco, 1977 – New York
- Trombidium kneissli (Krausse, 1915) – Europe
- Trombidium latum C. L. Koch, 1837 – Europe
- Trombidium mastigotarsum (Feider, 1956) – Romania
- Trombidium mediterraneum (Berlese, 1910) – Europe, Algeria
- Trombidium meyeri (Krausse, 1916) – Europe
- Trombidium monoeciportuense (André, 1928) – Czech Republic, Monaco
- Trombidium neumeyeri (Krausse, 1916) – Japan
- Trombidium parasiticus (de Geer, 1778) – Sweden
- Trombidium poriceps (Oudemans, 1904) – Europe
- Trombidium pygiacum C. L. Koch, 1837 – Germany, Romania
- Trombidium raeticum Schweizer & Bader, 1963 – Switzerland
- Trombidium rhopalicus (Vercammen-Grandjean & Popp, 1967) – Germany
- Trombidium rimosum C. L. Koch, 1837 – Europe
- Trombidium rowmundi Haitlinger, 1996 – Poland (uses spiders as host)
- Trombidium semilunare Feider, 1955 – Romania
- Trombidium southcotti Zhang & Saboori, 1996 – Iran
- Trombidium susteri (Feider, 1956) – Germany, Romania
- Trombidium teres (André, 1928) – France
- Trombidium toldti (Methlagl, 1928) – Austria

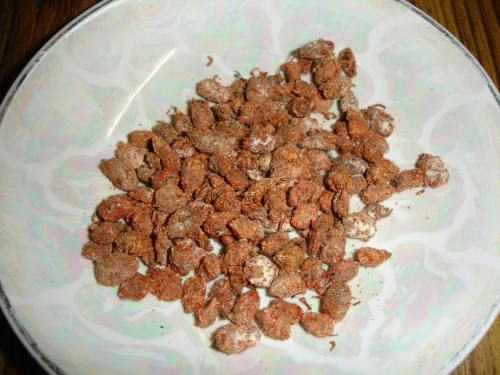
Dry Trombidium in Chhattisgarh Market for preparation of Traditional Medicine
