= Yunkeracarus faini =

Scientific classification
- Domain: Eukaryota
- Kingdom: Animalia
- Phylum: Arthropoda
- Subphylum: Chelicerata
- Class: Arachnida
- Order: Sarcoptiformes
- Family: Gastronyssidae
- Genus: Yunkeracarus
- Species: Y. faini

Binomial name
- Yunkeracarus faini Hyland & Clark, 1959

Species of mite

Yunkeracarus faini is a species of mite belonging to the family Gastronyssidae. This tiny mite reaches a length of only 280 μm. It can be distinguished from its congeners by the presence of long setae on the tarsi and around the anus. It has only been recorded from the nostrils of Peromyscus leucopus (the white-footed mouse) in Michigan state and even here appears to be a rather rare species.
