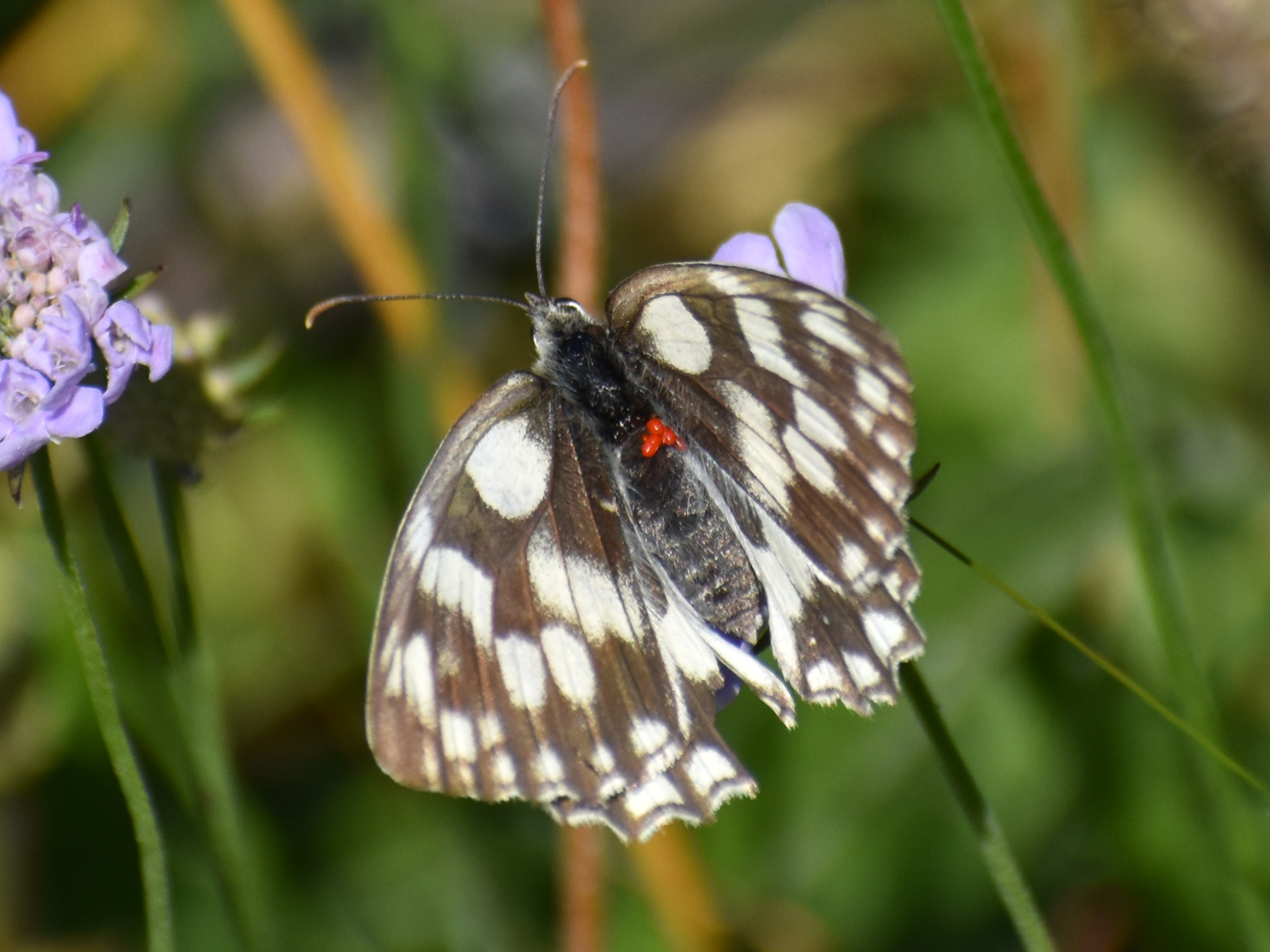
- On a butterfly

Scientific classification
- Domain: Eukaryota
- Kingdom: Animalia
- Phylum: Arthropoda
- Subphylum: Chelicerata
- Class: Arachnida
- Order: Trombidiformes
- Family: Trombidiidae
- Genus: Trombidium
- Species: T. breei

Binomial name
- Trombidium breei Southcott, 1986

= Trombidium breei =

Species of mite

Trombidium breei is a species of red mite in the genus Trombidium in the family Trombidiidae. It is found in Europe. The larvae are parasites/hosts of certain butterflies (Lepidoptera), particularly meadow brown (Maniola jurtina), gatekeeper (Pyronia tithonus), marbled white (Melanargia galathea), common blue (Polyommatus icarus) and small skipper (Thymelicus sylvestris). They attach themselves to the thorax or legs of the butterfly and transfer from host to host when the butterflies alight to nectar at flowers.

== Name ==
The species is named after Reverend William Thomas Bree (1754–1822).
