= Sphaerolichus =

Scientific classification
- Kingdom: Animalia
- Phylum: Arthropoda
- Subphylum: Chelicerata
- Class: Arachnida
- Order: Trombidiformes
- Family: Sphaerolichidae
- Genus: Sphaerolichus; Berlese, 1904

Species
- Sphaerolichus armipes; Sphaerolichus barbarus; Sphaerolichus cuspidonasus; Sphaerolichus lekprayoonae; Sphaerolichus narinosus; Sphaerolichus oculus

Genus of mites

Sphaerolichus is a mite genus in the family Sphaerolichidae.
