= Neobrachypoda =

Scientific classification
- Domain: Eukaryota
- Kingdom: Animalia
- Phylum: Arthropoda
- Subphylum: Chelicerata
- Class: Arachnida
- Order: Trombidiformes
- Family: Axonopsidae
- Genus: Neobrachypoda; Koenike, 1914

Genus of spiders

Neobrachypoda is a genus of mites belonging to the family Axonopsidae.

The species of this genus are found in Northern Europe.

Species:

- Neobrachypoda ekmani (Walter)
