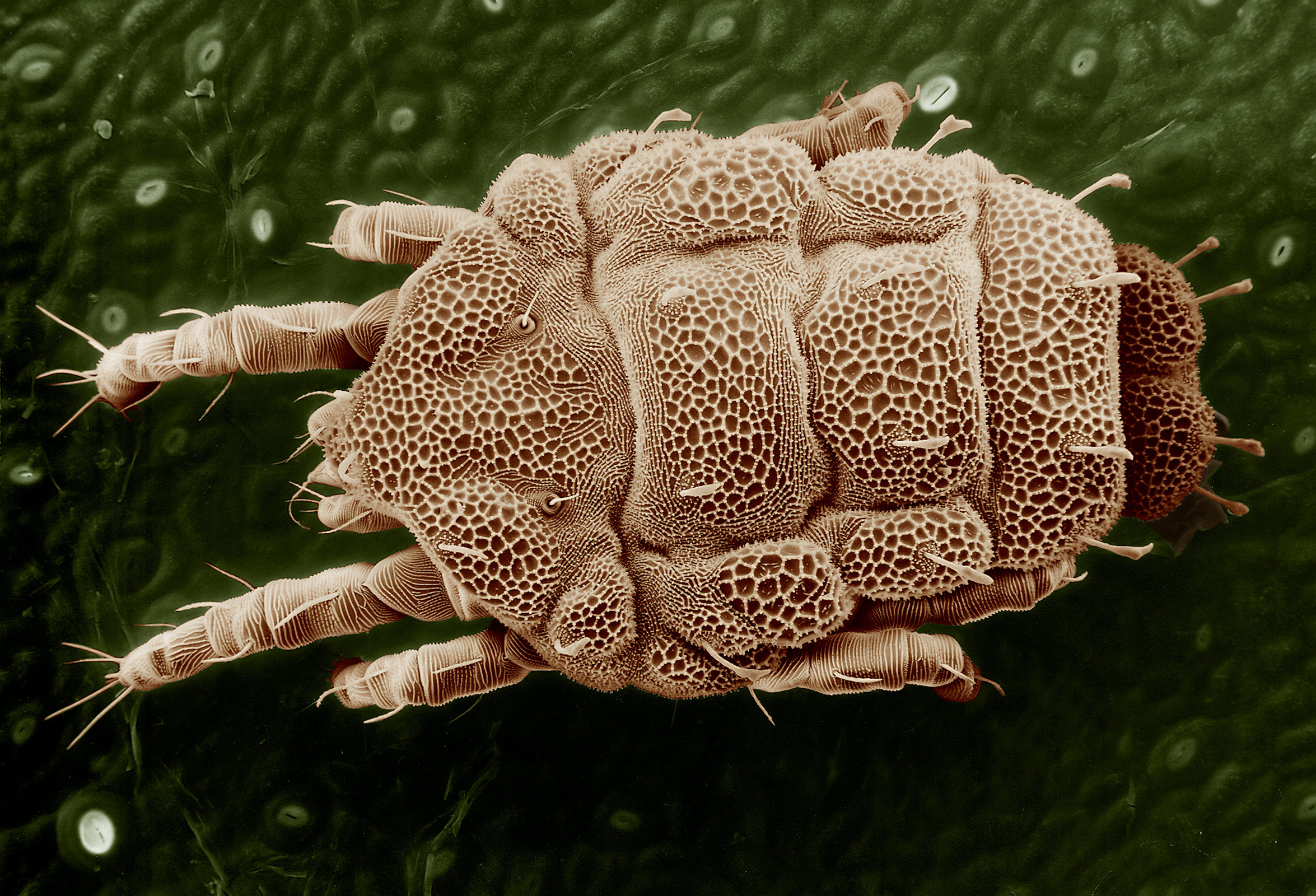

Scientific classification
- Kingdom: Animalia
- Phylum: Arthropoda
- Subphylum: Chelicerata
- Class: Arachnida
- Order: Trombidiformes
- Family: Tydeidae
- Genus: Lorryia
- Species: L. formosa

Binomial name
- Lorryia formosa Cooreman, 1958

Synonyms
- Tydeus formosus André, 1980

= Lorryia formosa =

Species of mite

Lorryia formosa, commonly known as the yellow mite or the citrus yellow mite, is a species of acariform mite. They are in the subfamily Tydeinae belonging to the family Tydeidae. Commonly found on the foliage of citrus trees around the world, Lorryia formosa also associates with a variety of other plant types. The life cycle includes six discrete stages of development, and the lifespan averages about 37 days. The females of the species use an asexual form of reproduction where the growth and development of embryos occurs without fertilization by a male, a process called thelytoky.

== Taxonomy ==
Lorryia formosa, originally found in Morocco, was first described by Cooreman in 1958. In his 1980 revision of the family Tydeidae, H.M. André synonymized the genus Lorryia with Tydeus, and Lorryia formosa became Tydeus formosus. André based his revision on the similarities of the chaetotaxy, especially on the legs, but ignored body ornamentation, which is a major character used by other authors. In 1998, Kazmierski revised the Tydeinae subfamily, this time using ornamentation and other features, and reestablished the genus Lorryia.

== Description ==
In Lorryia formosa, like all Acariformes mites, the capitulum is the head segment and the idiosoma is the body segment. The idiosoma is further subdivided into the propodosoma, metapodosoma, and opisthosoma. The Tydeinae subfamily, to which Lorryia formosa belongs, is characterized by having three pairs of lyrifissures (grooves that encircle the surface of an appendage) and a pair of primitive eyes (oculi) which commonly occur laterally on the propodosoma, the middle body segment to which the first two pairs of legs are attached. The genital region includes a progenital aperture flanked by setae. Specimens are generally less than 250 μm long.

== Life cycle ==
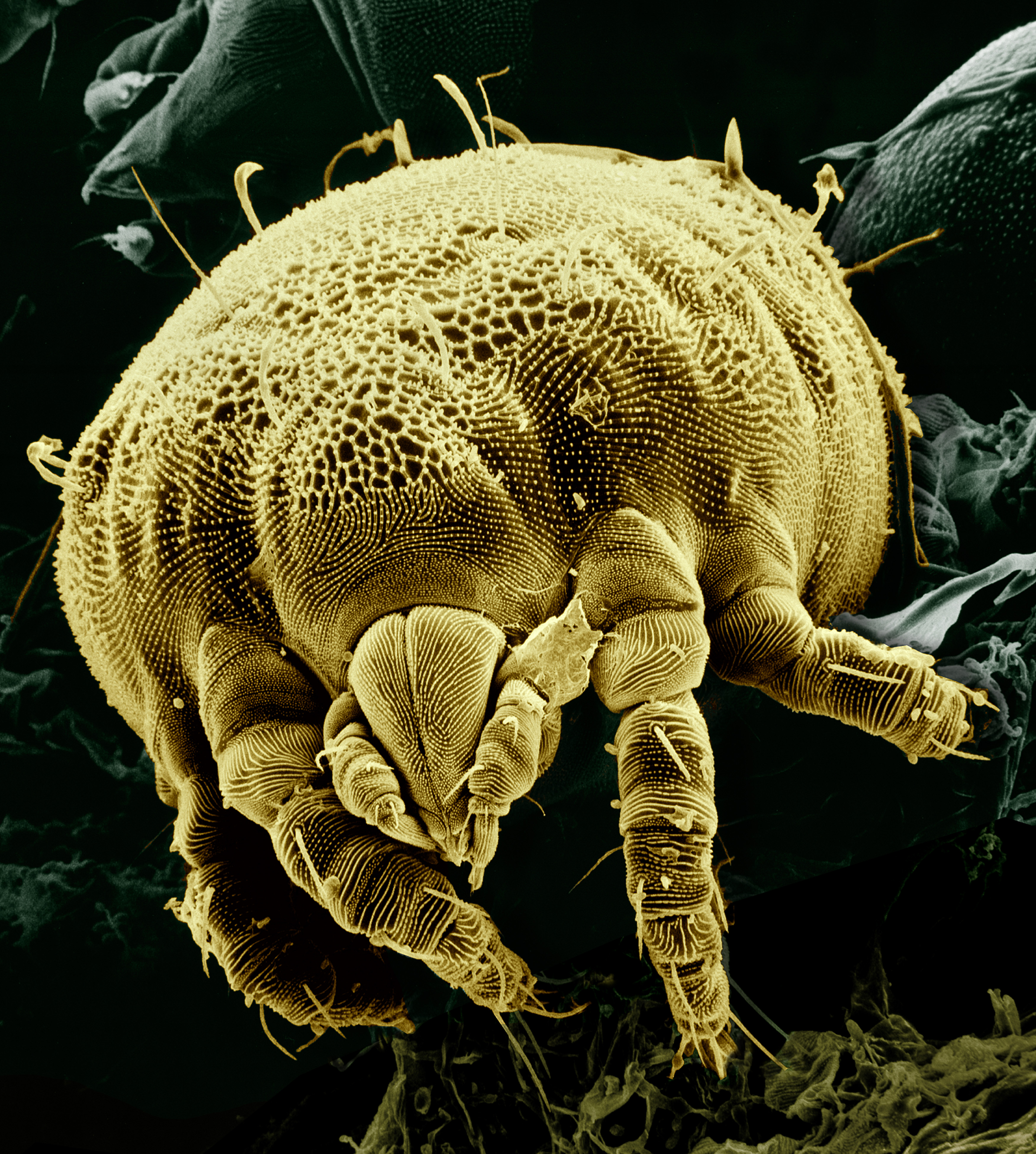
Scanning electron micrography of L. formosa, front view of the capitulum

Life cycles of Lorryia formosa are characterized by six distinct developmental stages: egg, larva, nymph stages (protonymph, deutonymph, and tritonymph), and adult. The average lifetime is 37 days, of which 60% is considered adulthood. The females of the species use an asexual form of reproduction where the growth and development of embryos occurs without fertilization by a male; this type of parthenogenesis, where females are produced from unfertilized eggs, is called thelytoky. It is not known whether the intracellular endosymbiont bacterium Wolbachia is responsible for the alteration in reproductive capability. Wolbachia, a genus of inherited bacteria common in insects, are known to alter the sex ratio in arthropods and mites. The sex ratio is also greatly influenced by the host plant: one study found that on citrus, 30% of the population were males, compared to 62% males when reared on grapefruit. Reared on rubber trees, the percentage of males in the population drops to very low, or nothing.

== Habitat and distribution ==
Lorryia formosa has been found associated with chayote squash (Sechium edule), citrus, dahlia, pear, papaya, mango, Cola acuminata, and the parana pine (Araucaria angustifolia) in Brazil. In Portugal, it has been collected from Prunus domestica, P. persica, P. armeniaca, apple (Malus domestica), bell peppers (Capsicum annuum). It has also been reported from Hibiscus species collected in Guadeloupe, French Antilles. L. formosa is also found on citrus plants throughout the world. For example, it has been found in the Mediterranean region, as well as Algeria, Italy, Libya, Morocco, Portugal and Spain. It is common and widespread on Florida citrus. Lorryia formosa is the only species of Tydeinae thought to be a pest of citrus.
