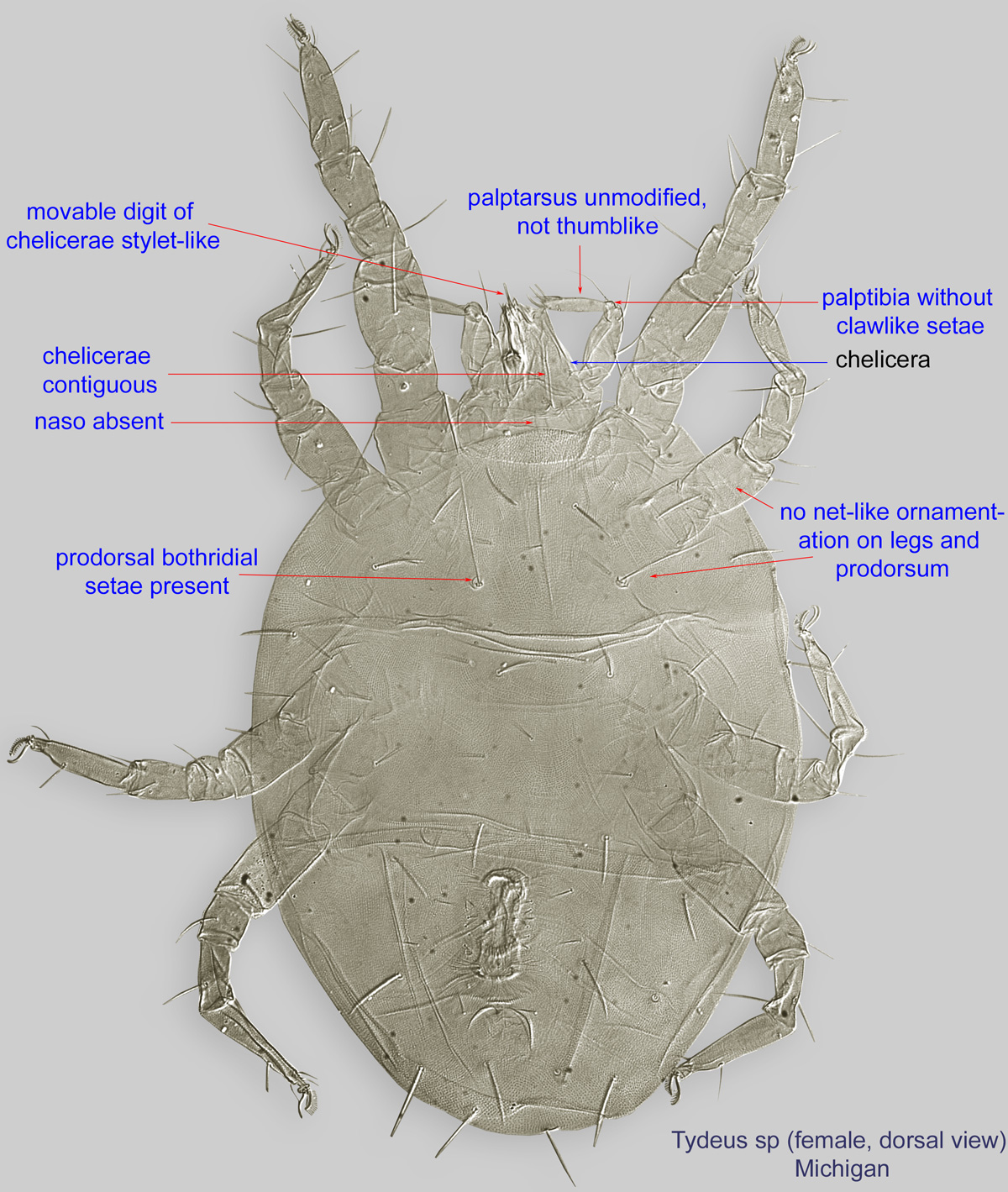

Scientific classification
- Kingdom: Animalia
- Phylum: Arthropoda
- Subphylum: Chelicerata
- Class: Arachnida
- Order: Trombidiformes
- Family: Tydeidae
- Genus: Tydeus; Koch, 1836

Species
- Many, see text

= Tydeus (mite) =

Genus of mites

Tydeus is a genus of mites belonging to the family Tydeidae. These are small, usually white, mites with soft bodies covered in striations and each leg terminating in two claws.

== Description ==
Tydeus, like most mites, have a pair of chelicerae, a pair of palps and four pairs of legs. Each palp has an unmodified palptarsus lacking markedly elongated setae, and a palptibia lacking claw-like setae. The chelicerae are contiguous with each other and have stylet-like movable digits. Bothridial setae are present on the prodorsum of the body. The ovipore is longitudinal. The tarsi of the first leg pair end in claws.

The patterns of setae on the legs help to separate Tydeus from other genera in the family. The genu of the first leg pair has three setae while the genu of the second leg pair has two setae, and those of the third and fourth leg pairs have one seta each. Additionally, the femur of the first leg pair has three setae.

== Ecology ==
Mites in this genus occur in various habitats including plant leaves, moss, nests of vertebrate animals, barn debris and stored products. They are omnivorous scavengers that also prey on small arthropods and eggs of arthropods. For example, Tydeus caudatus both preys on eriophyid mites and feeds on downy mildew.

Tydeus are themselves preyed on by phytoseiid mites.

Some species occur in nests of bees, which they probably enter by walking. They have been found in nests of Western honey bee (Apis mellifera), bumble bees (Bombus) and carpenter bees (Xylocopa). They are not considered harmful to bees.

== Selected species ==
- Tydeus argutus
- Tydeus bohemiensis
- Tydeus brevistylus
- Tydeus calabrus
- Tydeus californicus
- Tydeus caudatus
- Tydeus citri
- Tydeus commutabilis
- Tydeus demeyerei
- Tydeus dignus
- Tydeus diversus
- Tydeus domesticus
- Tydeus electus
- Tydeus eriophyes
- Tydeus goetzi
- Tydeus grabouwi
- Tydeus halophilus
- Tydeus heterosetus
- Tydeus hughesae
- Tydeus hyacinthi
- Tydeus inclutus
- Tydeus interruptus
- Tydeus kochi
- Tydeus lambi
- Tydeus langei
- Tydeus linarocatus
- Tydeus lindquisti
- Tydeus lolitae
- Tydeus longisetosus
- Tydeus maculatus
- Tydeus marinus
- Tydeus maximus
- Tydeus munsteri
- Tydeus mutabilis
- Tydeus octomaculatus
- Tydeus olivaceus
- Tydeus plumosus
- Tydeus praeditus
- Tydeus quadrisetosus
- Tydeus rafalskii
- Tydeus roseus
- Tydeus sampsoni
- Tydeus sarekensis
- Tydeus spathulatus
- Tydeus subalpinus
- Tydeus subterraneus
- Tydeus svalbardensis
- Tydeus tiliae
- Tydeus totensis
- Tydeus viviparus
- Tydeus xylocopae
