= Axonopsidae =

Scientific classification
- Domain: Eukaryota
- Kingdom: Animalia
- Phylum: Arthropoda
- Subphylum: Chelicerata
- Class: Arachnida
- Order: Trombidiformes
- Family: Axonopsidae; Viets, 1929

Family of mites

Axonopsidae is a family of mites belonging to the order Trombidiformes.

Genera:

- Estellacarus Habeeb, 1954
- Neobrachypoda Koenike, 1914
- Woolastookia Habeeb, 1954
