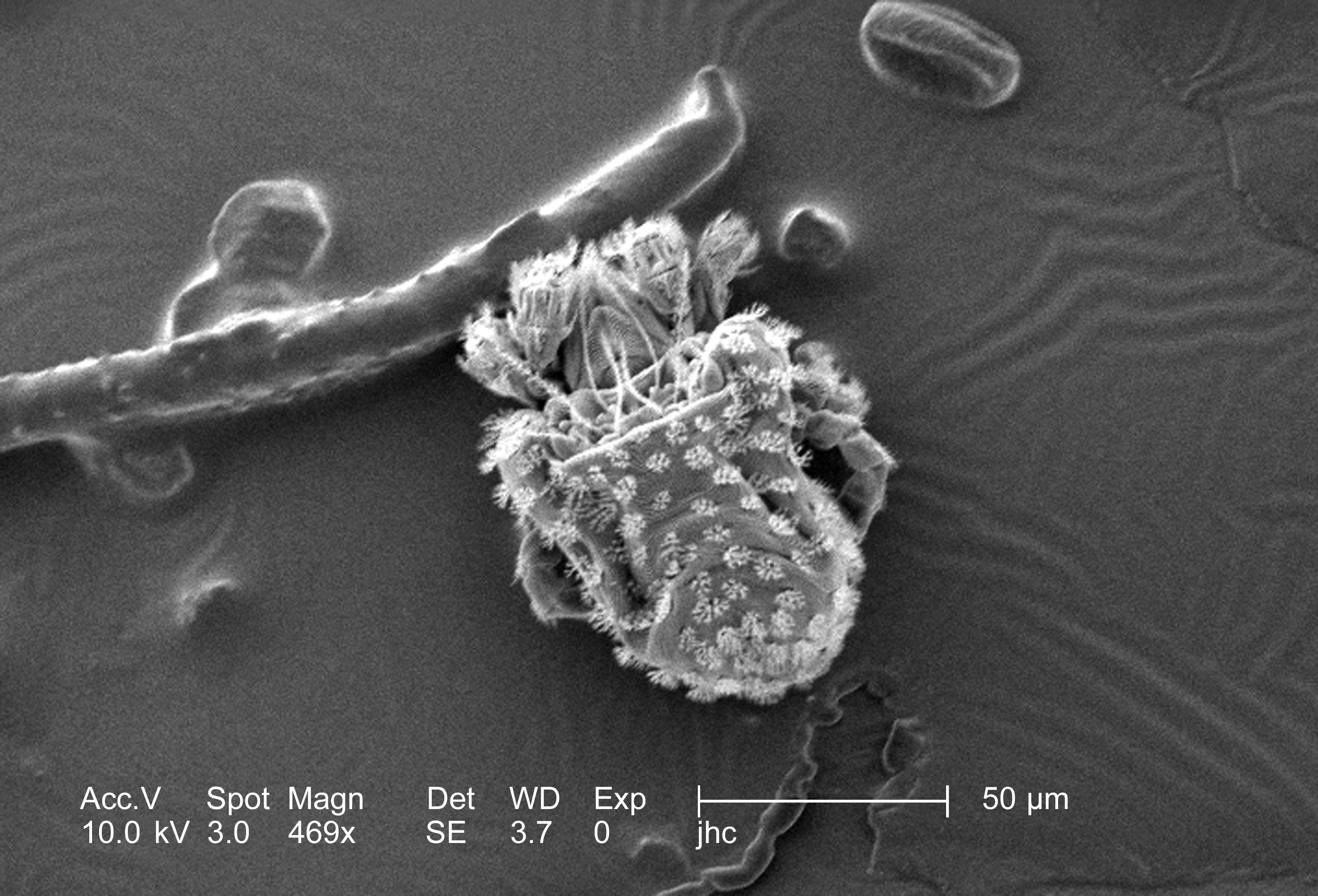
- Endeostigmata:Nanorchestidae:Nanorchestes

Scientific classification
- Kingdom: Animalia
- Phylum: Arthropoda
- Subphylum: Chelicerata
- Class: Arachnida
- Superorder: Acariformes
- Suborder: Endeostigmata; Reuter, 1909

= Endeostigmata =

Suborder of mites

Endeostigmata is a suborder of acariform mites. There are about ten families in Endeostigmata. The grouping is strongly suspected to be paraphyletic, containing unrelated early diverging lineages of mites.

== Taxonomy ==
- Suborder Endeostigmata Reuter, 1909 (5 superfamilies, 10 families, 27 genera, 108 species)
  - Infraorder Bimichaliida Oconnor, 1984 (1 superfamily)
    - Superfamily Alycoidea G. Canestrini & Fanzago, 1877 (3 families)
      - Family Alycidae G. Canestrini & Fanzago, 1877 (6 genera, 29 species)
      - Family Nanorchestidae Grandjean, 1937 (5 genera, 45 species)
      - Family Proterorhagiidae Lindquist & Palacios-Vargas, 1991 (1 genus, 1 species)
  - Infraorder Nematalycina Lindquist, Krantz & Walter, 2009 (1 superfamily)
    - Superfamily Nematalycoidea Strenke, 1954 (2 families)
      - Family Micropsammidae Coineau & Theron, 1983 (1 genus, 1 species)
      - Family Nematalycidae Strenke, 1954 (4 genera, 4 species)
      - Family Proteonematalycidae Kethley, 1989 (1 genus, 1 species)
  - Infraorder Terpnacarida Oconnor, 1984 (2 superfamilies)
    - Superfamily Oehserchestoidea Kethley, 1977 (1 family)
      - Family Oehserchestidae Kethley, 1977 (1 genus, 4 species)
      - Family Grandjeanicidae Kethley, 1977 (1 genus, 3 species)
    - Superfamily Terpnacaroidea Grandjean, 1939 (1 family)
      - Family Terpnacaridae Grandjean, 1939 (2 genera, 11 species)
  - Infraorder Alicorhagiida Oconnor, 1984 (1 superfamily)
    - Superfamily Alicorhagioidea Grandjean, 1939 (1 family)
      - Family Alicorhagiidae Grandjean, 1939 (5 genera, 9 species)
