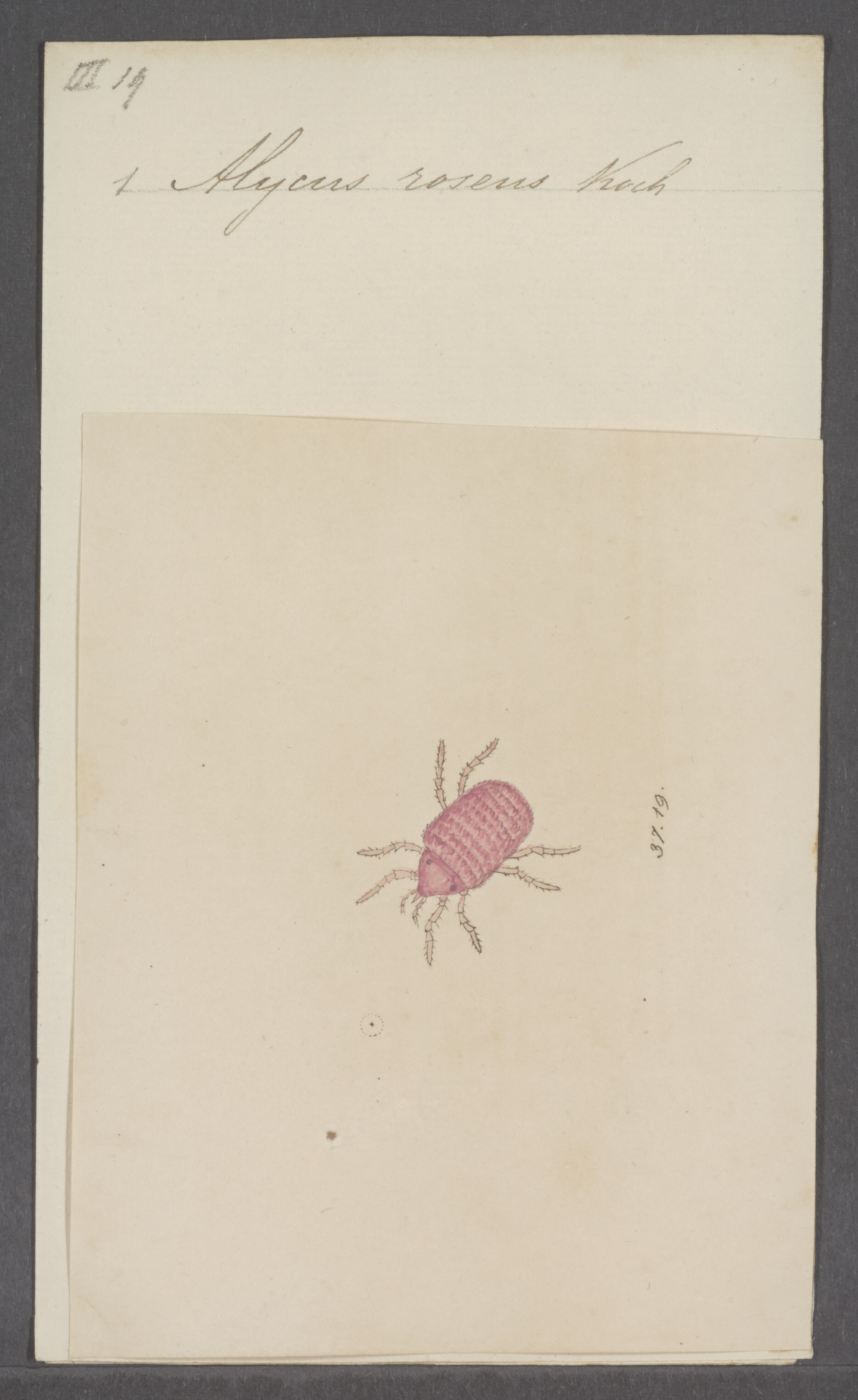
- Alycus

Scientific classification
- Kingdom: Animalia
- Phylum: Arthropoda
- Subphylum: Chelicerata
- Class: Arachnida
- Suborder: Endeostigmata
- Family: Alycidae; Canestrini & Fanzago, 1877

= Alycidae =

Alycidae Temporal range: Devonian–present

Family of mites

Alycidae is a family of mites, or endeostigs, in the suborder Endeostigmata. There are at least 6 genera in Alycidae.

== Genera ==
These six genera belong to the family Alycidae:

- Alycus C.L.Koch, 1842
- Amphialycus Zachvatkin, 1949
- Coccalicus Willmann, 1952
- Laminamichaelia Uusitalo, 2010
- Orthacarus Zachvatkin, 1949
- Petralycus Grandjean, 1943
