= Yunkeracarus =

Scientific classification
- Domain: Eukaryota
- Kingdom: Animalia
- Phylum: Arthropoda
- Subphylum: Chelicerata
- Class: Arachnida
- Order: Sarcoptiformes
- Family: Gastronyssidae
- Genus: Yunkeracarus; Fain, 1957

Species include
- Yunkeracarus ascanicus Yunkeracarus faini Yunkeracarus microti Yunkeracarus muris Yunkeracarus stepposus

Genus of mites

Yunkeracarus is a genus of mites belonging to the family Gastronyssidae. They live exclusively in the nostrils of rodents. Females can be recognized by the small transparent scales covering the body, males by the lack of copulatory suckers.
