= Sphaerolichidae =

Scientific classification
- Kingdom: Animalia
- Phylum: Arthropoda
- Subphylum: Chelicerata
- Class: Arachnida
- Order: Trombidiformes
- Suborder: Sphaerolichida
- Family: Sphaerolichidae; Berlese, 1913

Genera
- Sphaerolichus

Family of mites

Sphaerolichidae is a mite family in the suborder Sphaerolichida. They are characterized by their bizarre front legs.
