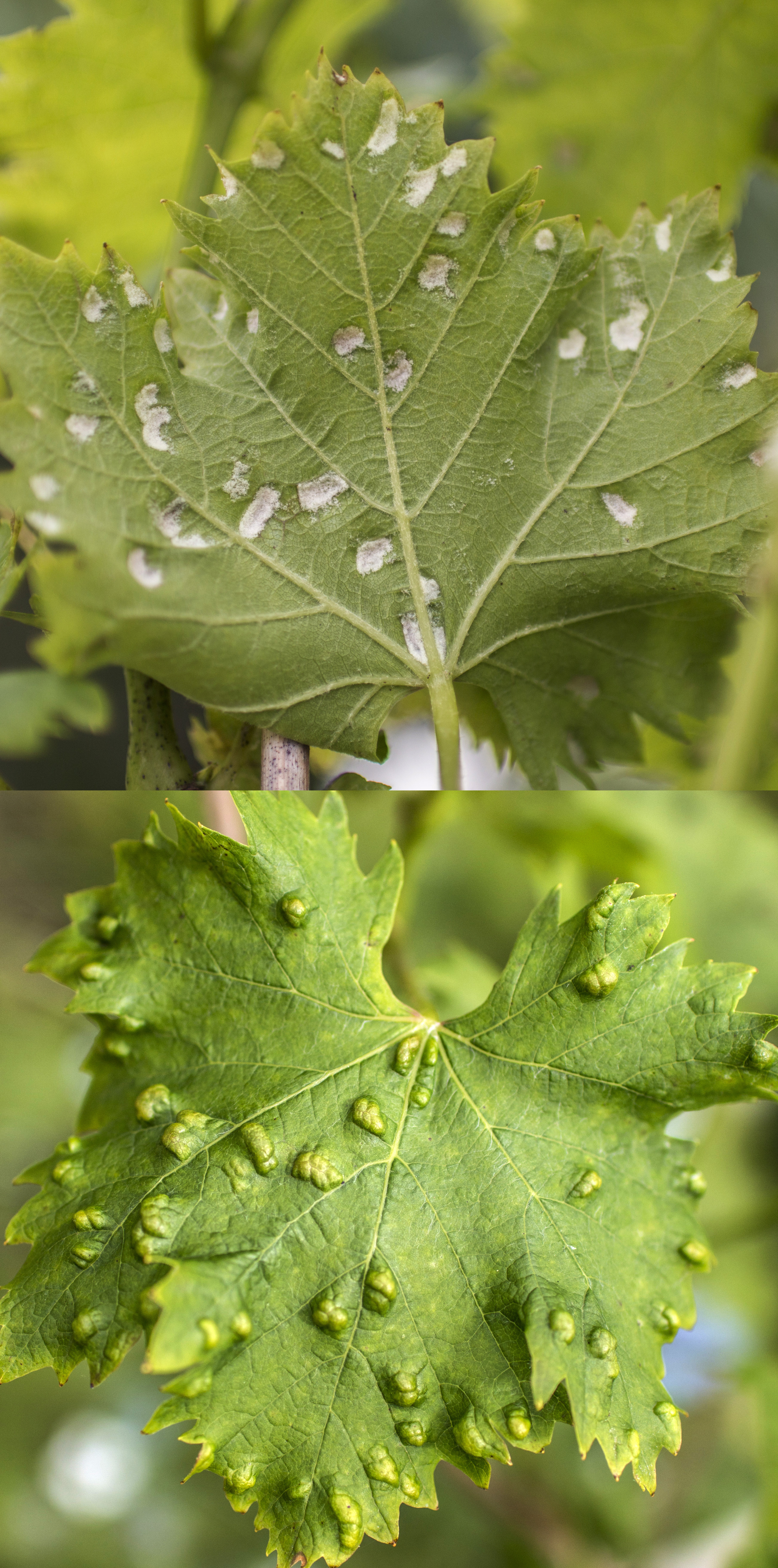
- Symptoms on leaves

Scientific classification
- Kingdom: Animalia
- Phylum: Arthropoda
- Subphylum: Chelicerata
- Class: Arachnida
- Family: Eriophyidae
- Genus: Eriophyes
- Species: E. vitis

Binomial name
- Eriophyes vitis (Pagenstecher, 1857)

Synonyms
- Colomerus vitis

= Eriophyes vitis =

Species of mite

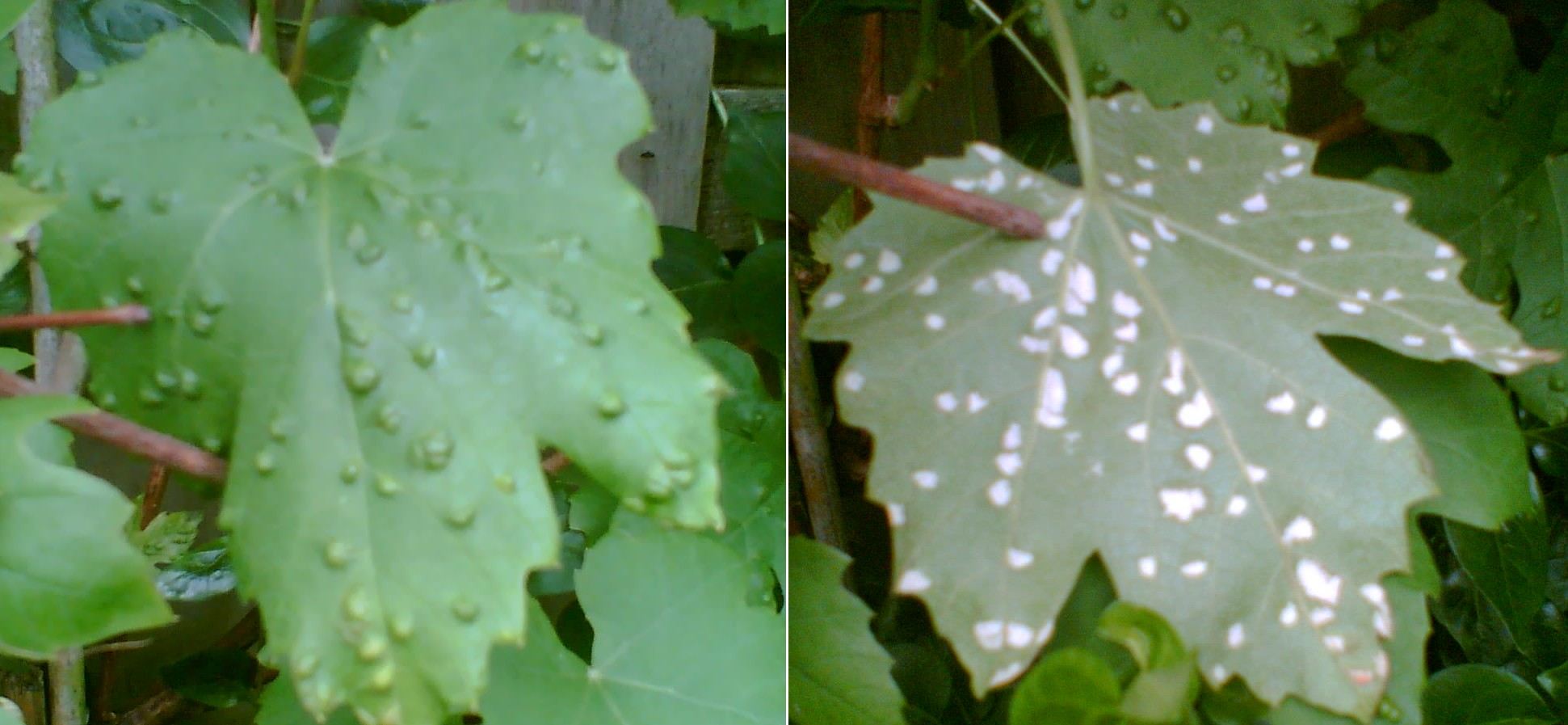
Eriophyes vitis

Eriophyes vitis, also known as grape erineum mite or blister mite, is a mite species in the genus Eriophyes infecting grape leaves (Vitis vinifera). E. vitis has spread worldwide and has three distinct strains: a leaf-curling strain, a blister-causing strain, and a strain that stunts the growth of buds. It is a vector of grapevine pinot gris virus and grapevine inner necrosis virus.

This species is associated with the mite Tydeus eriophyes on grapevines in the vicinity of Grabouw, South Africa.
