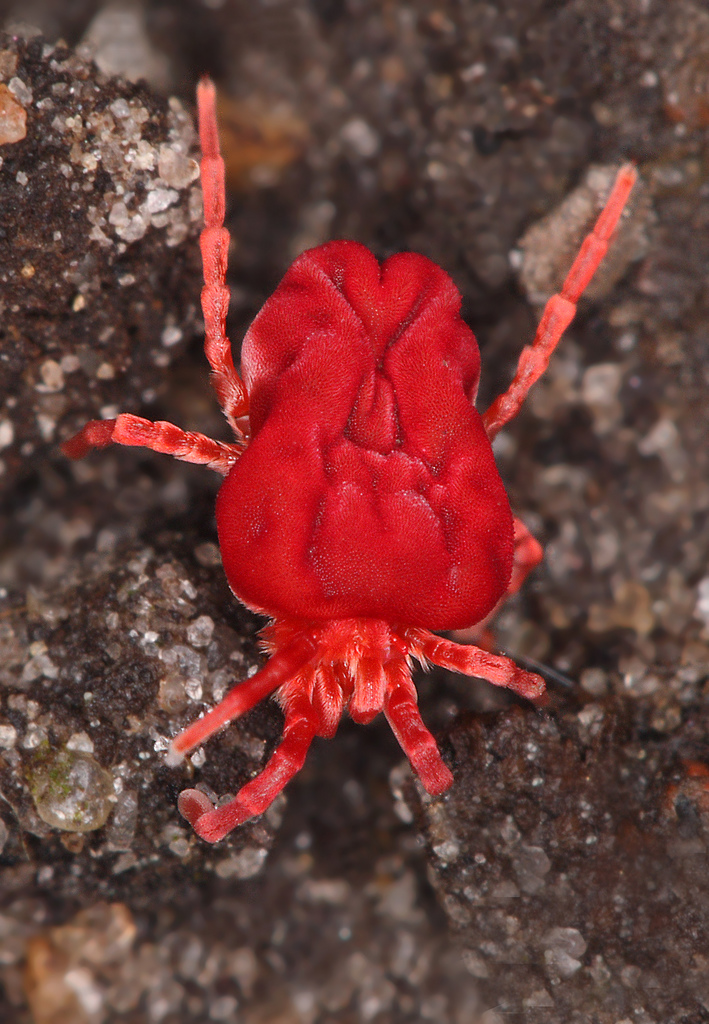

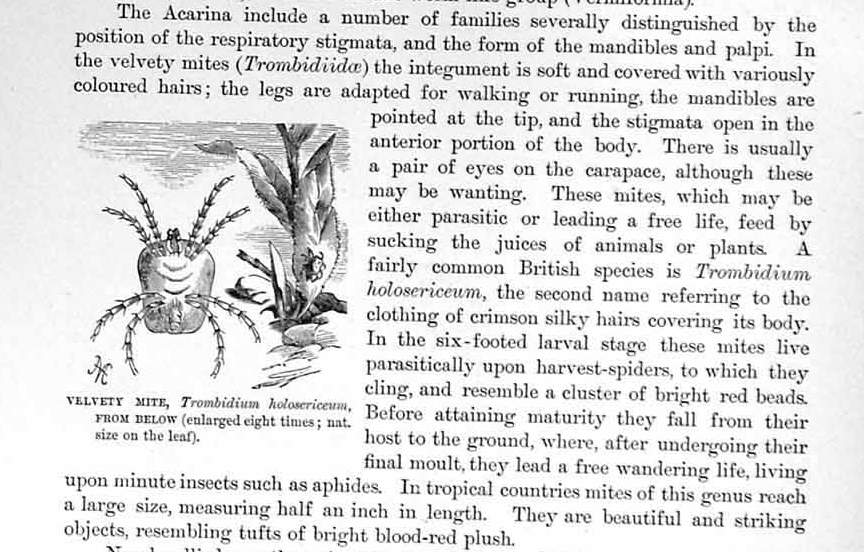
- 1896 description of Trombidium holosericeum

Scientific classification
- Kingdom: Animalia
- Phylum: Arthropoda
- Subphylum: Chelicerata
- Class: Arachnida
- Order: Trombidiformes
- Family: Trombidiidae
- Genus: Trombidium
- Species: T. holosericeum

Binomial name
- Trombidium holosericeum (Linnaeus, 1758)

Synonyms
- Acarus holosericeus

= Trombidium holosericeum =

Species of mite

Trombidium holosericeum is a species of mite in the genus Trombidium. It occurs in Europe, Asia, and Africa and is commonly confused with other red mite species.

== Description ==
This species is one of the largest mites in northern temperate zones, with a body length of about 4 mm (just over 1/8 inch). The soft, brightly red body is covered with fine hairs, giving it a velvety appearance. The small eyes are located on stalks. They have scissor-like chelicerae and their pedipalps are used as touch organs.

Its bright red color results from carotenoids, warning predators about the toxicity of the mite (aposematism). Almost nothing is known about the toxic substances used, but they are probably contained within the integument.

The specific epithet is derived from Ancient Greek ὅλος, holos, "whole" and σηρικ-, sērik-, "silken".

== Biology ==
While adults live freely and are often found wandering about, searching for small animals and insect eggs for food, the larvae try to find a host to attach themselves to, often an insect like a grasshopper or fly, but also arachnids like harvestmen or spiders. At this stage they appear as red globules on their hosts, sucking body liquid without severely harming the host. These larvae then develop into free-living nymphs that resemble adults.
