= Sphaerolichida =

Scientific classification
- Kingdom: Animalia
- Phylum: Arthropoda
- Subphylum: Chelicerata
- Class: Arachnida
- Order: Trombidiformes
- Suborder: Sphaerolichida

Families
- Lordalychidae; Sphaerolichidae

Suborder of mites

The Sphaerolichida is a suborder of mites belonging to the order Trombidiformes.
