= Gastronyssidae =

Scientific classification
- Kingdom: Animalia
- Phylum: Arthropoda
- Subphylum: Chelicerata
- Class: Arachnida
- Order: Sarcoptiformes
- (unranked): Astigmatina
- Family: Gastronyssidae; Fain, 1956

Genera include
- Gastronyssus; Opsonyssus; Sciuracarus; Yunkeracarus

Family of mites

Gastronyssidae is a family of acariform mites which live as parasites on birds and mammals.
