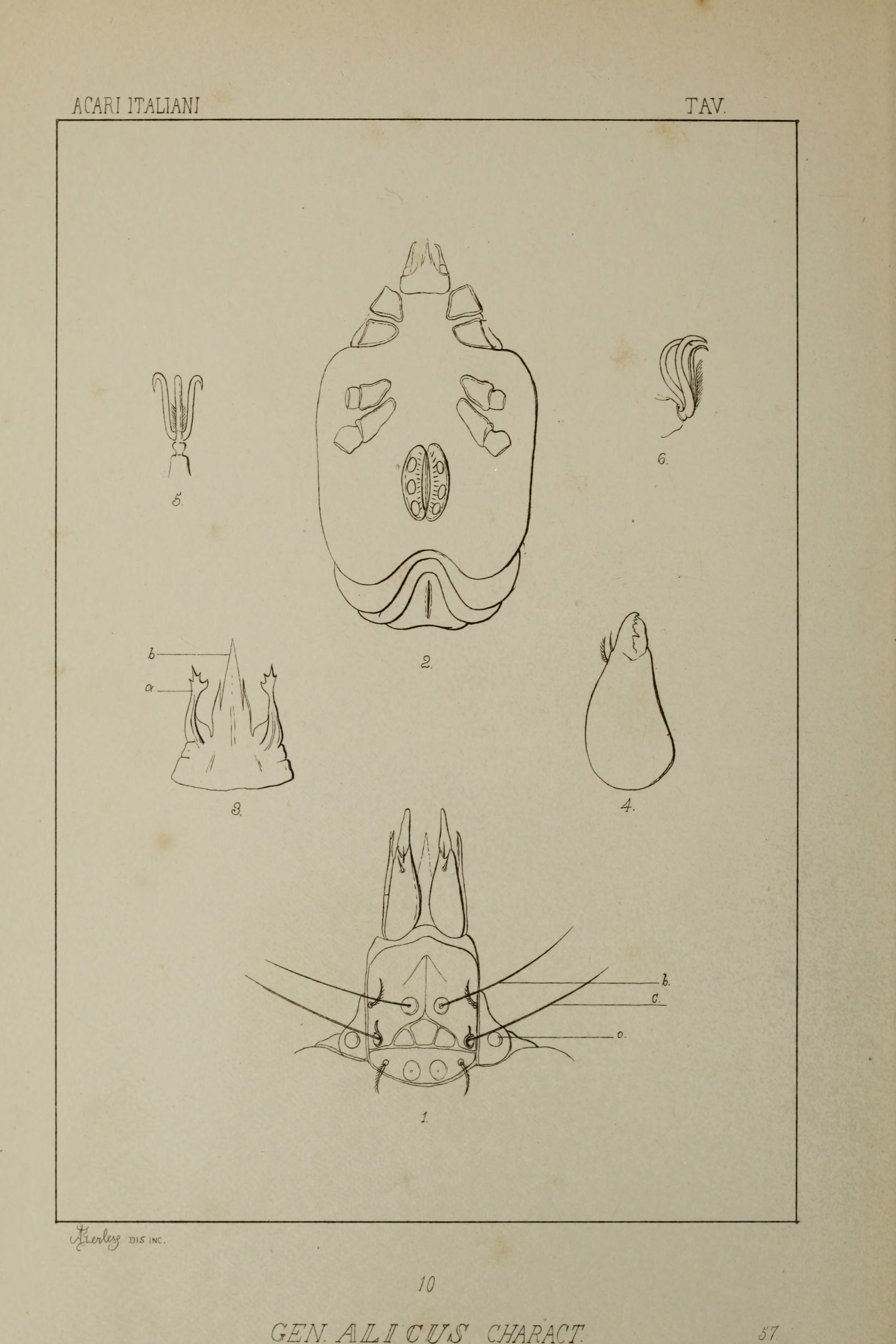
- Alycus

Scientific classification
- Kingdom: Animalia
- Phylum: Arthropoda
- Subphylum: Chelicerata
- Class: Arachnida
- Family: Alycidae
- Genus: Alycus; C. L. Koch, 1842

= Alycus =

Genus of mites

Alycus is a genus of mite, including the species Alycus roseus.
