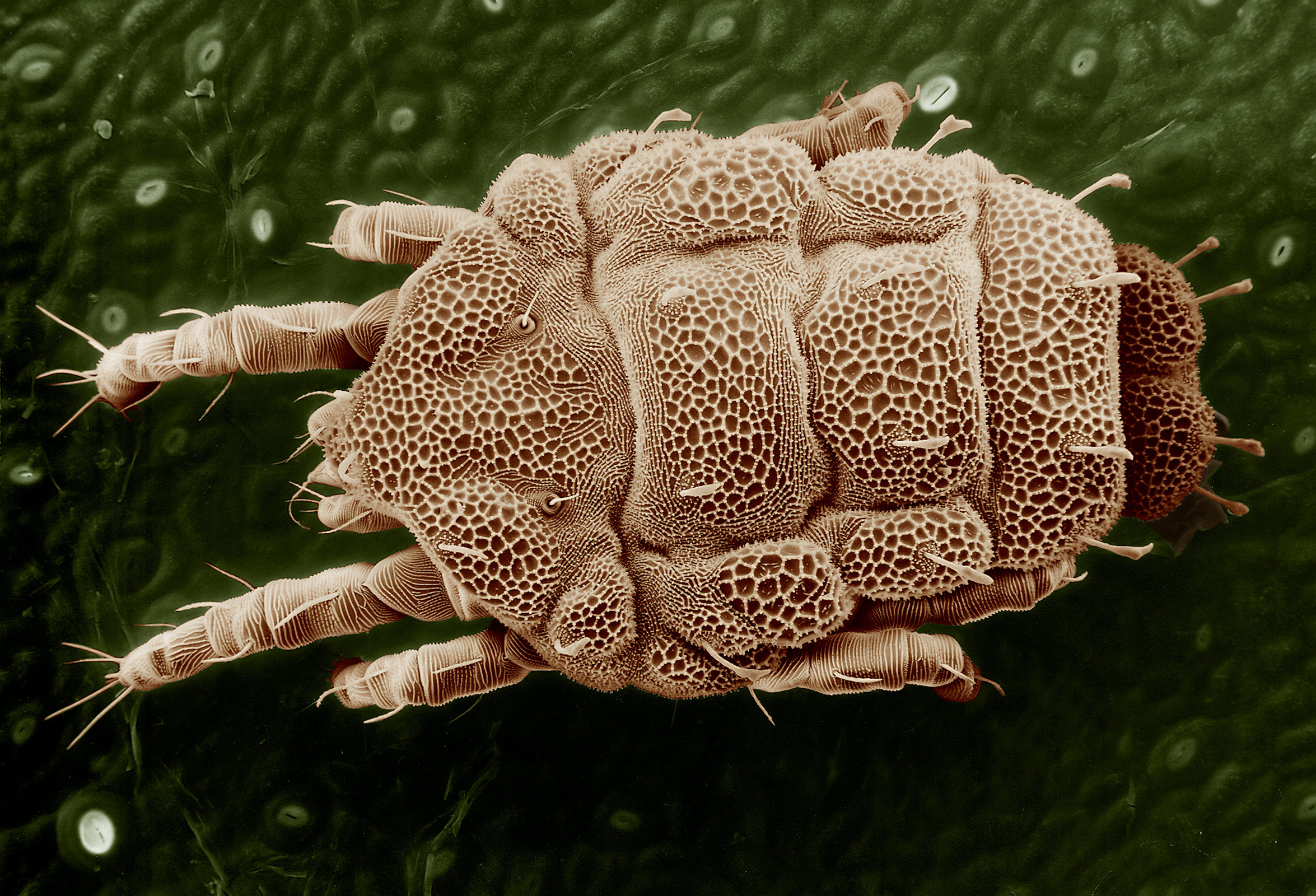
- "Yellow mite", Lorryia formosa

Scientific classification
- Kingdom: Animalia
- Phylum: Arthropoda
- Subphylum: Chelicerata
- Class: Arachnida
- Order: Trombidiformes
- Infraorder: Eupodina
- Superfamily: Tydeoidea
- Family: Tydeidae; Kramer, 1877

Subfamilies
- Australotydeinae; Pretydeinae; Tydeinae

Diversity
- 30 genera, >320 species

= Tydeidae =

Tydeidae Temporal range: Devonian–present

Family of mites

Tydeidae is a family of acariform mites. As of 2016, it contained over 300 species in three subfamilies, though more species have been discovered since then.

These mites live in a wide range of habitats and there are predatory, fungivorous and scavenging species.

== Description ==
Tydeidae are soft-bodied mites with an idiosoma that is striated, reticulated or a combination of both. They have two bothridial setae. The chelicerae have fused bases, a movable digit that is relatively short and needle-like, and a fixed digit that is reduced. They may have two or three eyes, though some species are blind.

Of the three subfamilies, Pretydeinae has no setae on the genu of legs II, III or IV, and the palptarsus has a triple eupathidium at the end. The other two subfamilies have one or two setae (Tydeinae) or three setae (Australotydeinae) on the genu of leg II, and the palptarsus ends in a double or triple eupathidium.

== Ecology ==
Tydeids are among the most commonly encountered mites in arboreal habitats, including leaves, stems, tree trunks, canopy soils, sporocarps and nests. They are also found in caves, soil, humus, litter, grass, straw, hay and stored products.

Most tydeids are scavengers or fungivores, while some can feed on plants, pollen or animal prey.

Various tydeid species are themselves preyed on by phytoseiid mites.

Species in several genera have been found in beehives. The nature of their relationship with bees is uncertain.

== Importance ==
Some species of Tydeus are medically important: T. interruptus may be a reservoir for scrapie-like agents, while T. molestus causes itching and skin irritation in humans and domestic animals.

Tydeus californicus and Lorryia formosa can damage citrus plants. On the other hand, some tydeid species can benefit agriculture by suppressing (through their feeding) powdery mildew and downy mildew.

== Taxonomy ==
Tydeidae includes three subfamilies with the following genera:

Australotydeinae
- Australotydeus

Pretydeinae

- Novzelorryia
- Prelorryia
- Pretydeus
- Ueckermannia

Tydeinae

- Acanthotydides
- Afridiolorryia
- Afrotydeus
- Apolorryia
- Brachytydeus
- Edlorryia
- Idiolorryia
- Kenlorryia
- Krantzlorryia
- Lorryia
- Melissotydeus
- Metalorryia
- Momenia
- Neoapolorryia
- Neolorryia
- Nudilorryia
- Orfareptydeus
- Paralorryia
- Perafrotydeus
- Pseudolorryia
- Quadrotydeus
- Quasitydeus
- Tydeus
- Tydides

It once also included subfamilies Edbakerellinae, Pronematinae, Triophtydeinae and Tydaeolinae. Edbakerellinae and Triophtydeinae have since been moved into family Triophtydeidae, while Pronematinae and Tydaeolinae have been moved into family Iolinidae.
