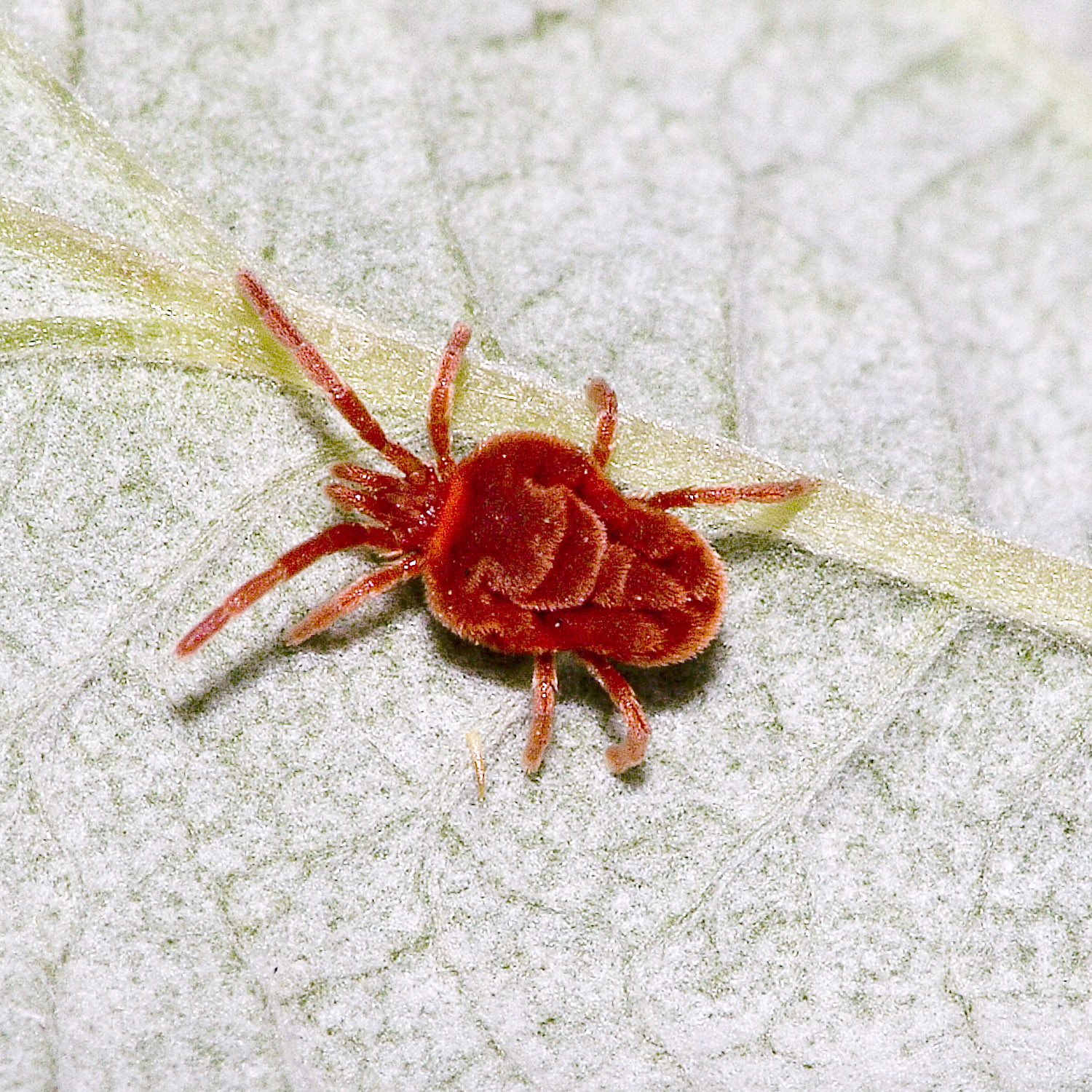
- Trombidium sp.

Scientific classification
- Kingdom: Animalia
- Phylum: Arthropoda
- Subphylum: Chelicerata
- Class: Arachnida
- Order: Trombidiformes
- Superfamily: Trombidioidea
- Family: Trombidiidae; Leach, 1815

= Trombidiidae =

Trombidiidae Temporal range: Palaeogene–present

Family of mites

Trombidiidae, also known as red velvet mites, true velvet mites, or rain bugs, are small arachnids (eight-legged arthropods) found in plant litter and are known for their bright red color.

While adults are typically no more than 4 mm (0.16 in) in length, some species can grow larger and the largest, including the African Dinothrombium tinctorum and Indian Trombidium grandissimum, may exceed 12 mm (0.47 in). This also makes them the largest mites, if disregarding ticks engorged after feeding; unlike those, D. tinctorum and T. grandissimum are harmless to humans.

Their life pattern is in stages similar to other members of the Prostigmata: egg, pre-larva, larva, protonymph, deutonymph, tritonymph and adult (male or female). They usually have only one breeding cycle per year.

They are active predators as grown adults. As larvae they are often parasites of insects and other arachnids. This lifestyle is typical of the Parasitengona.

One well-known species from Europe, Asia, and North Africa is Trombidium holosericeum. The systematics of this group has been in flux and many former subfamilies of this are now raised to families within the Trombidioidea.

== List of genera ==
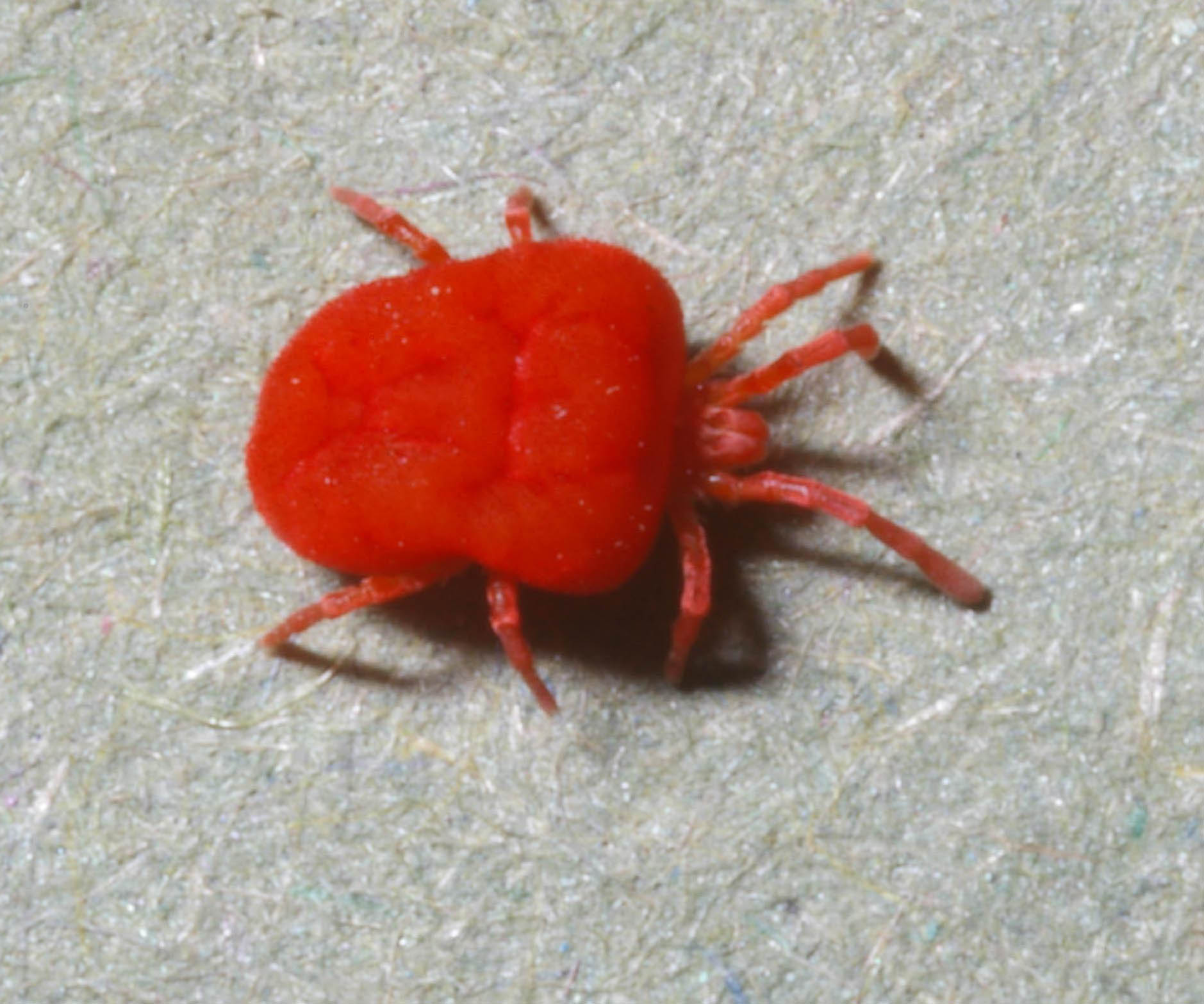
Adult Trombidiidae mite, predatory on small invertebrates

According to Joanna Makol

- Trombidiinae Leach, 1815
  - Allothrombium Berlese, 1903 synonyme Corethrothrombium Oudemans, 1928 & Mongolothrombium Feider, 1973
  - Andinothrombium Makol, 2007
  - Andrethrombium Makol, 2007
  - Arknotrombium Haitlinger, 2007
  - Azaritrombium Saboori, Bagheri & Haddad, 2005
  - Caenothrombium Oudemans, 1927
  - Calctrombidium Haitlinger, 2003
  - Clinotrombium Southcott, 1986
  - Darjeelingia Makol, 2007
  - Dinothrombium Oudemans, 1910
  - Dolichothrombidium Feider, 1945
  - Iranitrombium Saboori & Hajiqanbar in Saboori, Hajiqanbar & Irani-nejad 2003
  - Mesothrobium Hirst, 1926 synonyme Austrothrombium Womersley, 1934
  - Monotrombium Zhang in Zhang & Norbakhsh 1995
  - Oskootrombium Saboori, Bagheri & Haddad 2006
  - Paratrombium Bruyant, 1910
  - Pollicotrombium Southcott, 1986
  - Robauxthrombium Makol, 2007
  - Ronaldothrombium Makol, 2007
  - Trombidium Fabricius, 1775 synonyme Kaszabothrombium Fieder, 1973
  - Variathrombium Robaux, 1969
  - Wohltmannella Makol, 2007
  - Xenothrombium Oudemans, 1927

== Human use ==
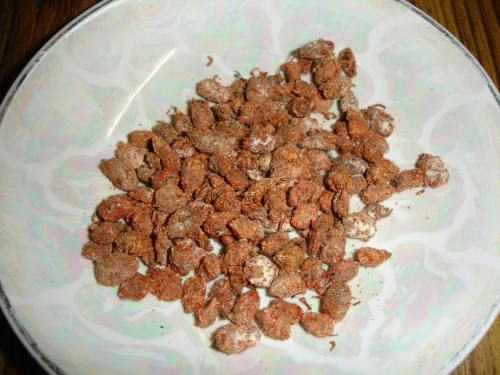
Dry Trombidium in a Chhattisgarh market

An oil made from Trombidium grandissimum is used in traditional Indian medicine.
