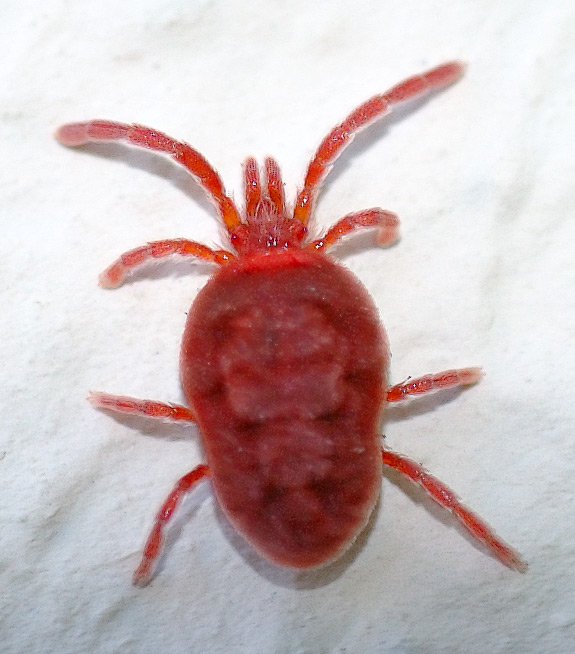
- Trombidium holosericeum

Scientific classification
- Kingdom: Animalia
- Phylum: Arthropoda
- Subphylum: Chelicerata
- Class: Arachnida
- Superorder: Acariformes
- Order: Trombidiformes

Suborders
- See text

= Trombidiformes =

Trombidiformes Temporal range: Devonian–present

Order of mites

Trombidiformes is a large, diverse order of mites.

== Taxonomy ==
In 1998, Trombidiformes was divided into the Sphaerolichida and the Prostigmata. The group has few synapomorphies by which it can be defined, unlike the other major group of acariform mites, Sarcoptiformes. Its members include medically important mites (such as Demodex, the chiggers, and scrub-itch mites) and many agriculturally important species, including the spider mites (Tetranychidae). The superfamily Eriophyoidea, traditionally considered members of the Trombidiformes, have been found to be basal mites in genomic analyses, sister to the clade containing Sarcoptiformes and Trombidiformes.

The 2004 classification retained the two suborders, comprising around 125 families and more than 22,000 described species.

In the 2011 revised classification, the order now contains 151 families, 2235 genera and 25,821 species, and there were another 10 species with 24 species that present only as fossils. These 151 families were classified into the same two major suborders:

- Sphaerolichida OConnor, 1984: Now contains only two families;
- Prostigmata Kramer, 1877: Still the biggest branch in this taxon, with four infraorders and 40 superfamilies.

== See also ==
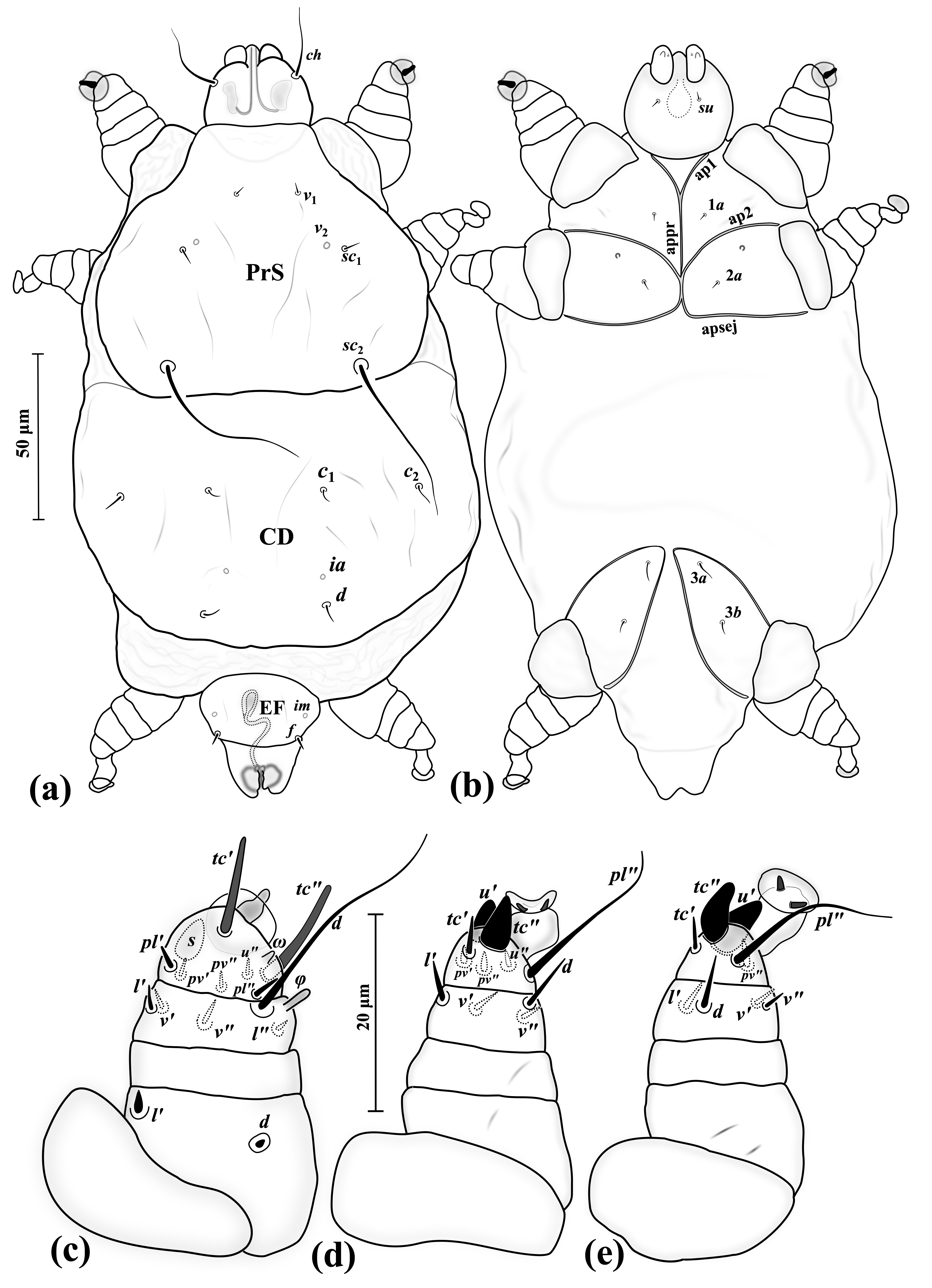
The mite Eutarsopolipus paryavae (Acari, Heterostigmatina, Podapolipidae) (male)

e.g. Hydrachnidae

- Hydrachna

e.g. others:

- Alycus
- Bdellodes
- Eupodes
