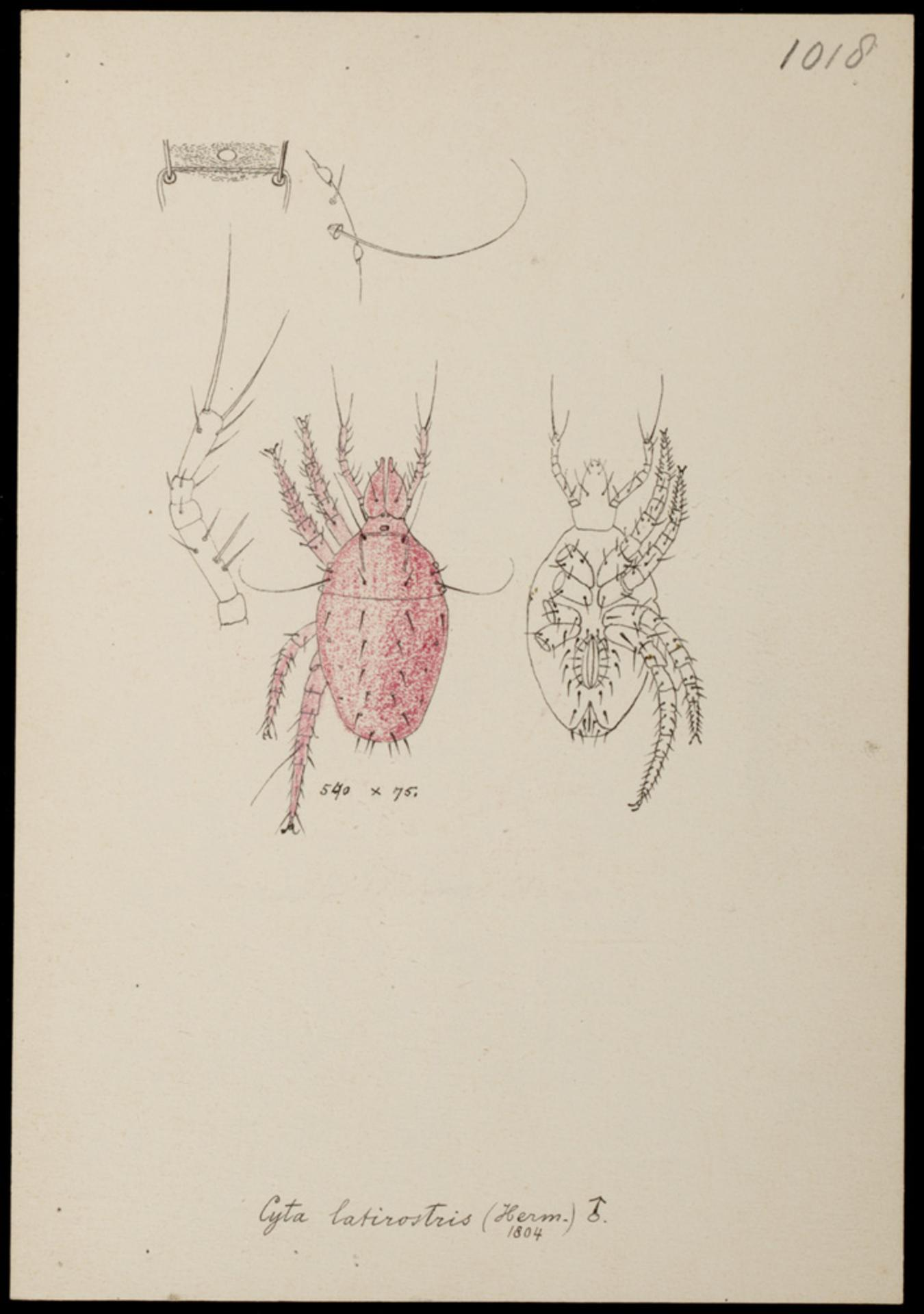

Scientific classification
- Domain: Eukaryota
- Kingdom: Animalia
- Phylum: Arthropoda
- Subphylum: Chelicerata
- Class: Arachnida
- Order: Trombidiformes
- Family: Bdellidae
- Genus: Cyta
- Species: C. latirostris

Binomial name
- Cyta latirostris Hermann, 1804

Synonyms
- Scirus latirostris

= Cyta latirostris =

Species of mites

Cyta latirostris is a species of snout mite in the family Bdellidae. The cosmopolitan species was first described by Jean-Frédéric Hermann in 1804 as Scirus latirostris.

Cyta latirostris is found in Europe, Africa, Australia and Hawaii, in many habitats, including pasture, grass, soil, heath, moss, and leaf litter, occurring under a wide range of plants.

It is a predatory mite and a natural enemy of the redlegged earth mite, Halotydeus destructor.
