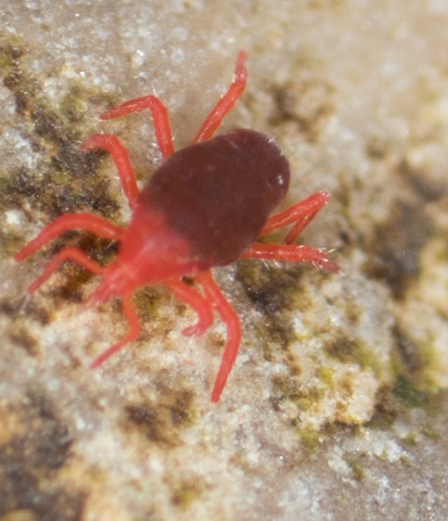

Scientific classification
- Kingdom: Animalia
- Phylum: Arthropoda
- Subphylum: Chelicerata
- Class: Arachnida
- Order: Trombidiformes
- Family: Bdellidae
- Genus: Neomolgus
- Species: N. littoralis

Binomial name
- Neomolgus littoralis (Linnaeus)

= Neomolgus littoralis =

Species of mite

Neomolgus littoralis, also known as the intertidal red mite, is a species of snout mite in the family Bdellidae, found along shorelines in North America, Europe, and Japan. These mites can reach 2 millimetres (0.079 in) in length. They are red with ridges on their abdomens, white hairs on their legs, and long snouts. They eat small insects, including kelp flies.
