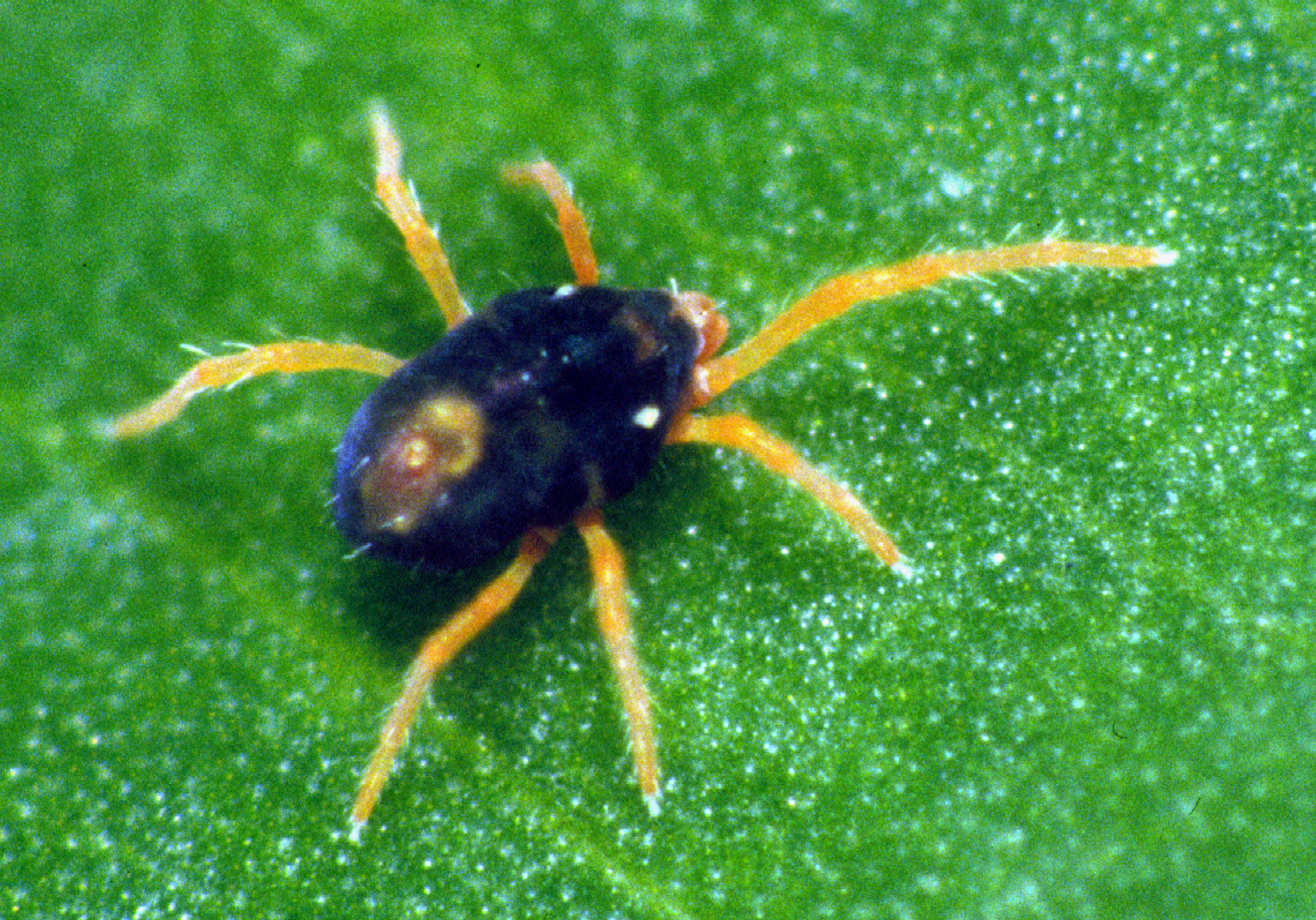

Scientific classification
- Kingdom: Animalia
- Phylum: Arthropoda
- Subphylum: Chelicerata
- Class: Arachnida
- Order: Trombidiformes
- Family: Penthaleidae
- Genus: Penthaleus
- Species: P. major

Binomial name
- Penthaleus major (Dugès, 1834)

= Penthaleus major =

Species of mite

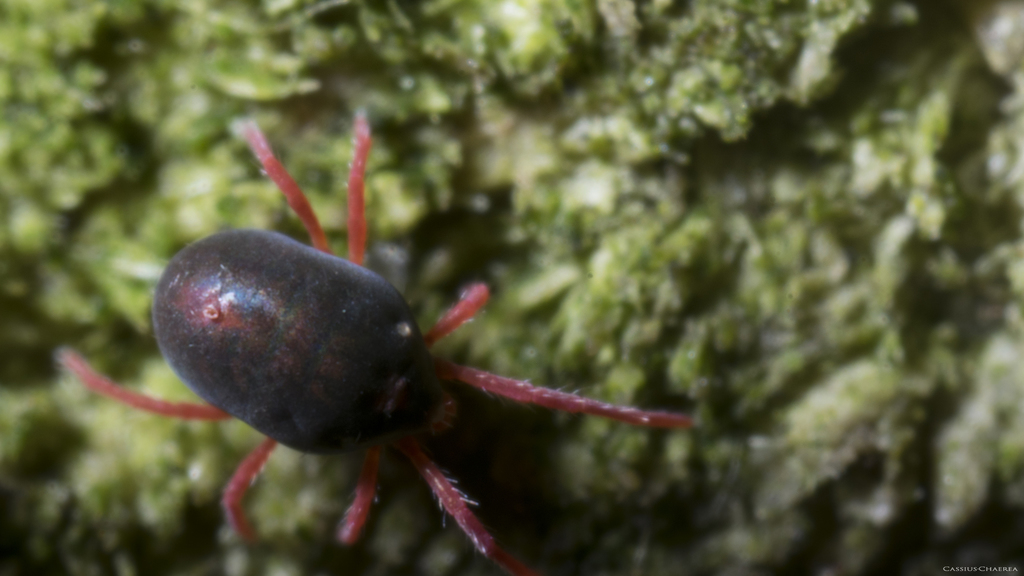
Blue oat mite found in the Czech Republic

Penthaleus major, known generally as the winter grain mite or blue oat mite, is a species of earth mite in the family Penthaleidae. They are black or dark blue in color and are widespread across the world. They are commonly found on oats and in pastures and spend most of their time on the surface of soil, and are occasionally found on wheat, barley, peas, lentil and lucerne, and seldom on canola.

== Description ==
The adult blue oat mite measures anywhere from 1/32 to 1/16 inch, or from around 0.79 to 1.59 millimeters, and has orange-red legs and a dark blue to black body with a red or orange spot on its upper abdomen. Their front legs are barely the longest. Blue oat mite anuses are dorsal.

Right after they hatch from their eggs, these mites are pink-orange colored, then brownish in a short time, before turning green and eventually becoming adults. Blue oat mite larvae are about 0.3 millimeters (1/83 inch) in length, 6-legged, and oval.

== Distribution and habitat ==
The blue oat mite has been reported across the world, in New Zealand, Australia, Germany, Spain, France, Greenland, Iceland, Italy, Norway, Portugal, Morocco, South Africa, the United States, Canada, Mexico, Argentina, Japan, and Brazil. They are not located in hot equatorial areas. P. major is found in pastures and crops, sometimes along with Halotydeus destructor, Sminthurus viridis and other pests.

They were introduced to other parts of the world from Europe, the first identified Australian specimen being a New South Wales specimen in 1921. These mites were found damaging oats in the Brazilian state of Rio Grande Do Sul on July 2, 2009 and were hastily reported to the Brazilian Ministry of Agriculture due to the presence of a new pest in the country.

In its southern distribution, it is particularly a pest in the winter, but in southern Greenland and northern Iceland, it is considered a summer pest. Blue oat mites were found to be present in parts of Texas in 1954, damaging many fields.

== Biology ==
These mites have three stages before adulthood; the egg stage, the larva stage, and the nymph stage. They live for around 45 days on average, and are eaten by insects and arachnids such as lacewings, ladybugs and other mites. They reproduce asexually, with 3 generations per season, and are active from May to November.

In a 2023 study, it was concluded that Penthaleus major could develop from a temperature range of anywhere from nine to twenty-one degrees Celsius; adults would not appear at six degrees Celsius and eggs would not hatch at twenty-four degrees Celsius. In a study that took place in 2018, Penthaleus major abundance was linked with a plentiful amount of grass, and the relation with the type of field was noteworthy yet differed from the relation of Halotydeus destructor and field type.

Blue oat mites cause damage by removing chlorophyll from a plant’s cells and tearing its epidermis, causing the plant to give off a silvery color. In Iceland, damage is particularly clear on Phleum pratense and Alopecurus pratensis.

Likely, blue oat mites spread across a long distance when their diapause eggs are blown in the wind, and clinging on to humans and animals along with some wind is the most prominent means of low and medium-distance transport; although, blue oat mites can be accidentally transported in soil by farm machinery, livestock and plant material relocation.

== Population control ==
In Australia, fungi of the genus Neozygites are known to be relatively effective at decreasing blue oat mite populations by halting female egg production, having somewhere around an 8-50% mortality rate, and in subarctic to arctic environments, using pesticides was found to be only partly successful. One such Neozygites species is N. acaracida, which redden the mites, negate their ability to produce offspring, and kill them. Using permethrin and 5 milliliters of deltamethrin saw great reduction in numbers of P. major and visible plant damage, although a side effect of this method is reduction of potassium in the yield.

== Etymology ==
One common name for this mite, the 'winter grain mite', comes from it being a pest in its southern distribution during the winter.
