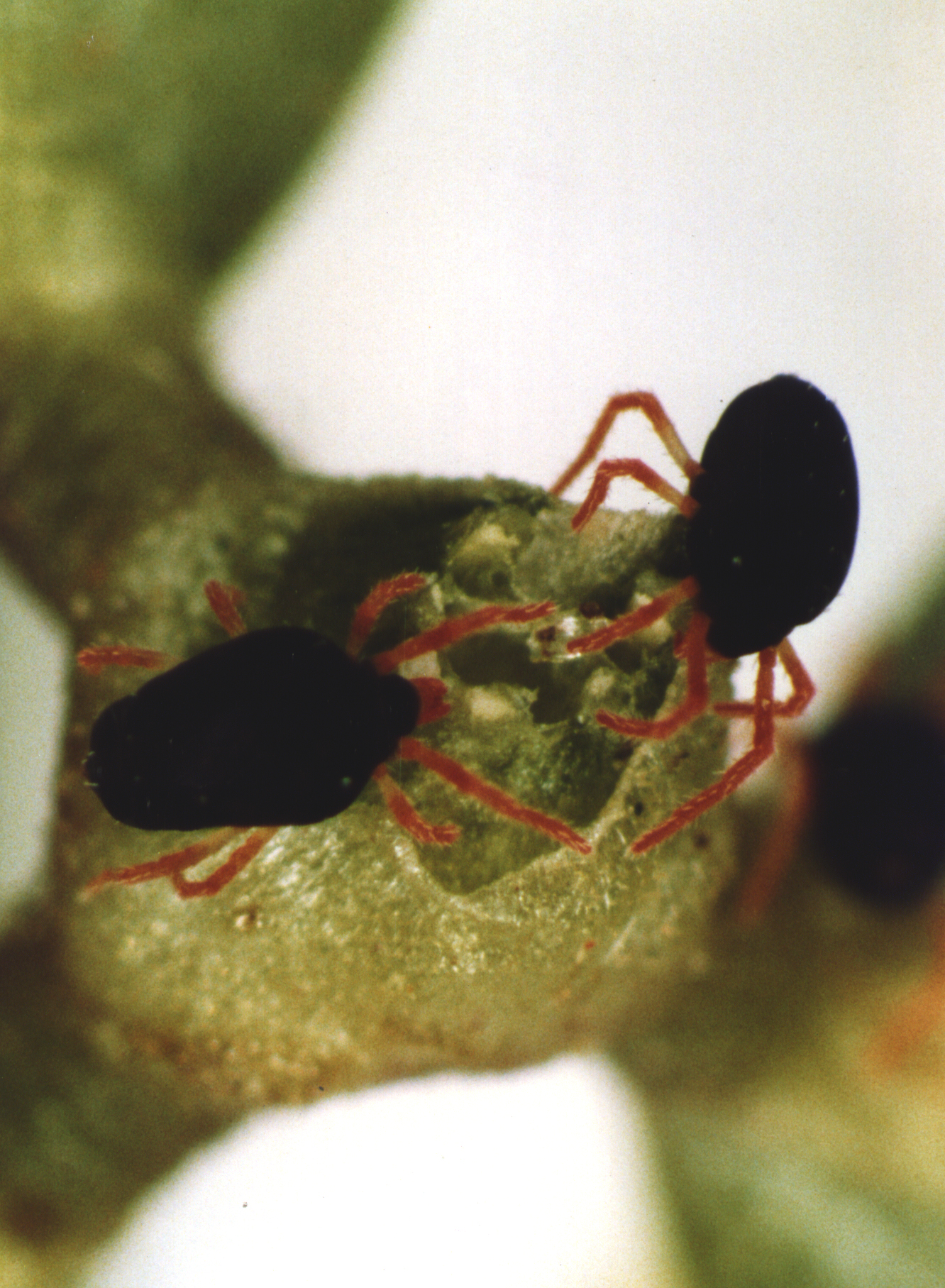
- Halotydeus destructor

Scientific classification
- Kingdom: Animalia
- Phylum: Arthropoda
- Subphylum: Chelicerata
- Class: Arachnida
- Order: Trombidiformes
- Superfamily: Eupodoidea
- Family: Penthaleidae
- Genus: Halotydeus; Berlese, 1891

= Halotydeus =

Genus of mites

Halotydeus is a genus of earth mites in the family of Penthaleidae, first described by Antonio Berlese in 1891. It is found on every continent except the Americas.

== Pest status ==
They are a major winter pest of a variety of crops and pastures in southern Australia.

== Species ==
Species listed as Halotydeus by CatalogueOfLife:

- Halotydeus anthropus Qin & Halliday, 1996 - South Africa
- Halotydeus bakerae Qin & Halliday, 1996 - South Australia
- Halotydeus castellus Qin & Halliday, 1996 - New South Wales, Australia
- Halotydeus destructor (R. W. Jack, 1908) - South Africa and Australia
- Halotydeus hydrodromus (Berlese & Trouessart, 1889) - England, France, Ireland and Italy
- Halotydeus mollis Luxton, 1990 Hong Kong, China
- Halotydeus signiensis Strandtmann & Tilbrook, 1968 - South Orkney Islands
- Halotydeus spectatus Qin & Halliday, 1996 - New South Wales, Australia
