= Pterostylis wapstrarum =

Fleshy greenhood

Conservation status
- Critically endangered (EPBC Act)

Scientific classification
- Kingdom: Plantae
- Clade: Tracheophytes
- Clade: Angiosperms
- Clade: Monocots
- Order: Asparagales
- Family: Orchidaceae
- Subfamily: Orchidoideae
- Tribe: Cranichideae
- Genus: Pterostylis
- Species: P. wapstrarum

Binomial name
- Pterostylis wapstrarum D.L.Jones

Synonyms
- Oligochaetochilus wapstrarum (D.L.Jones) Szlach.; Hymenochilus wapstrarum (D.L.Jones) D.L.Jones & M.A.Clem.

Species of orchid

Pterostylis wapstrarum, commonly known as the fleshy greenhood, is a plant in the orchid family Orchidaceae and is endemic to Tasmania. Both flowering and non-flowering plants have a rosette of leaves lying flat on the ground and flowering plants have up to fifteen crowded green flowers with darker green veins.

== Description ==
Pterostylis wapstrarum, is a terrestrial, perennial, deciduous, herb with an underground tuber. It has a rosette of between four and seven, oblong to egg-shaped leaves, each leaf 15–27 mm (0.6–1 in) long and 8–20 mm (0.3–0.8 in) wide, lying flat on the ground. Between five and fifteen green flowers with darker green veins are crowded together on a flowering spike 80–220 mm (3–9 in) high with four to six stem leaves with their bases wrapped around it. The flowers are about 10 mm (0.4 in) long and 5 mm (0.2 in) wide with the dorsal sepal and petals joined to form a hood called the "galea" over the column. The dorsal sepal is gently curved but suddenly curves downward near the tip and is about the same length as the petals. The lateral sepals turn downwards and are about 8 mm (0.3 in) long, 11 mm (0.4 in) wide, fused together for most of their length and cup-shaped with their tips about 1 mm (0.04 in) apart. The labellum is about 3 mm (0.1 in) long, 2 mm (0.08 in) wide and whitish-green with a dark green, appendage. Flowering occurs from October to December.

== Taxonomy and naming ==
Pterostylis wapstrarum was first formally described in 1998 by David Jones from a specimen collected near Pontville. The description was published in Australian Orchid Research, although as the orthographic variant Pterostylis wapstreorum. The specific epithet (wapstrarum) honours Johannes ("Hans") and Annie Wapstra for their assistance to Jones.

== Distribution and habitat ==
The fleshy greenhood grows in grassland and grassy forest near Pontville.

== Conservation ==
Pterostylis wapstrarum is listed as "critically endangered" under the Australian Government Environment Protection and Biodiversity Conservation Act 1999 and as "endangered" under the Tasmanian Government Threatened Species Protection Act 1995. The total population of this species is estimated to be fewer than 500 individual plants, none of which is known from a conservation reserve. It is threatened by habitat modification and land clearing, grazing by rabbits, inappropriate fire regimes, weeds, and destruction by the introduced red-legged earth-mite (Halotydeus destructor).
