= Cyta (disambiguation) =

Cyta may refer to:

- Cyta, a city of Colchis and the birthplace of Medea
- Cyta (mite)
- Cyta, Cypriot telecommunications provider
- Pembroke Airport, Canada (by ICAO code)
