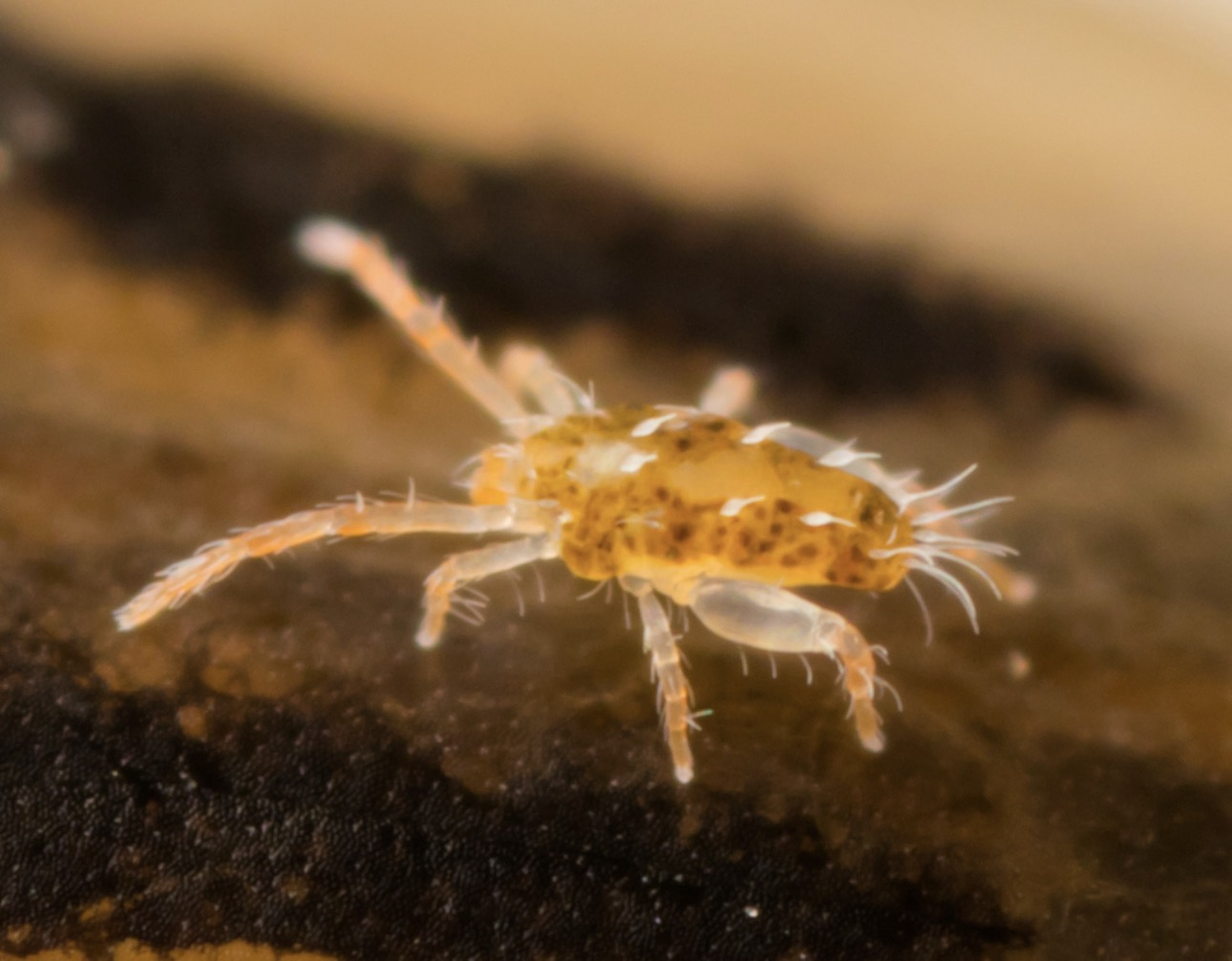
- Eupodes sp. in Hong Kong

Scientific classification
- Kingdom: Animalia
- Phylum: Arthropoda
- Subphylum: Chelicerata
- Class: Arachnida
- Order: Trombidiformes
- Superfamily: Eupodoidea
- Family: Eupodidae
- Genus: Eupodes; C.L. Koch, 1835

= Eupodes =

Genus of mites

Eupodes is a genus of mites found on all continents except South America.

== Genera ==
Genus Eupodes consists of at least 58 following species:

- Eupodes acanthus Olivier & Theron, 1998 – South Africa
- Eupodes alaskanensis Strandtmann, 1971 – Alaska, United States
- Eupodes angardi Strandtmann & Sømme, 1977 – Antarctica
- Eupodes bakeri Abou-Awad, El-Sawaf & Abdel-Khalek, 2006 – Egypt
- Eupodes berensis Shiba, 1976 – Malaysia
- Eupodes berlesei Thor, 1912 – Denmark, Italy and Switzerland
- Eupodes brevipes Banks, 1916 – California, United States
- Eupodes callejae Corpuz-Raros, 2005 – Philippines (Leyte and Luzon)
- Eupodes cordiformis Shiba, 1978 – Japan
- Eupodes crozetensis Strandtmann & Davies, 1972 – Iran and Crozet Islands
- Eupodes exiguus Booth, Edwards & Usher, 1985 – South Orkney Islands
- Eupodes fusifer R. Canestrini, 1886 – Italy
- Eupodes fusiferellus Meyer & Ryke, 1960 – South Africa
- Eupodes garciai Corpuz-Raros, 2005 – Philippines (Luzon and Leyte)
- Eupodes ghardagae Schuster, 1965 – Egypt
- Eupodes gilvus C.L. Koch, 1838 – Germany
- Eupodes haltica (Haller, 1880) – Switzerland
- Eupodes hamatus Olivier & Theron, 1997 – South Africa
- Eupodes hawaiiensis Strandtmann & Goff, 1978 – Hawaii, United States
- Eupodes hiemalis C.L. Koch, 1838 – Germany and Iceland
- Eupodes hjartdaliae Thor, 1934 – Norway
- Eupodes iconicus C.L. Koch, 1838 – Germany and Italy
- Eupodes indentatus Olivier & Theron, 1997 – South Africa
- Eupodes infirmus Shiba, 1978 – Japan
- Eupodes leucomelas C.L. Koch, 1838 – Germany
- Eupodes littoralis Shiba, 1978 – Japan
- Eupodes longipilus Thor, 1934 – South Africa
- Eupodes longisetatus Strandtmann, 1964 – Japan and Campbell Island, New Zealand
- Eupodes lumbarus Shiba, 1976 – Malaysia
- Eupodes lutatus Olivier & Theron, 1997 – South Africa
- Eupodes marinus Banks, 1896 – USA
- Eupodes milvinus C.L. Koch, 1838 – Germany, Italy, Netherlands and Sweden
- Eupodes minipilus Olivier & Theron, 1998 – Botswana, Cabo Verde, South Africa and Zimbabwe
- Eupodes minutus (Strandtmann, 1967) – South Georgia, Macquarie Island and New Zealand
- Eupodes niloticus Abou-Awad & El-Bagouri, 1985 – Egypt
- Eupodes ocellatus Willmann, 1952 – Germany
- Eupodes oedipus Oudemans, 1937 – Germany
- Eupodes okinoshimaensis Shiba, 1978 – Japan
- Eupodes onoi Shiba, 1976 – Singapore and Malaysia
- Eupodes parafusifer Meyer & Ryke, 1960 – Angola and South Africa
- Eupodes parvus Booth, Edwards & Usher, 1985 – South Orkney Islands
- Eupodes pasohensis Shiba, 1976 – Malaysia
- Eupodes pseudoclavifrons R. Canestrini, 1886 – Austria, Italy and Switzerland
- Eupodes pseudolumbarus Shiba, 1976 – Malaysia, Philippines
- Eupodes pusillus Shiba, 1976 – Malaysia, Philippines
- Eupodes riedli Schuster, 1965 – Crozet Islands, Antarctica
- Eupodes sigmoidensis Strandtmann & Goff, 1978 – Hawaii, India, Iran and Cote D’ivoire
- Eupodes signatus C.L. Koch, 1835 – Germany
- Eupodes skiaaki Thor, 1934 – Norway
- Eupodes strandtmanni Coineau, 1976 – France
- Eupodes striola C.L. Koch, 1836 – Germany
- Eupodes temperatus Shiba, 1978 – Egypt and Japan
- Eupodes tottanfjella Strandtmann, 1967 – Antarctica
- Eupodes trifasciatus C.L. Koch, 1838 – Germany
- Eupodes unifasciatus C.L. Koch, 1838 – England and Germany
- Eupodes vallombrosae Thor, 1934 – Italy, Switzerland and Spain
- Eupodes variegatus C.L. Koch, 1838 – Austria, England, Germany, Greenland, Ireland, Iceland, Israel, Italy, Norway, South Africa, Spain, Sweden and Jan Mayen Island
- Eupodes versicolor C.L. Koch, 1838 – Germany
- Eupodes viridis Oudemans, 1906 – Greenland
- Eupodes voxencollinus Thor, 1934 – Alaska, Canada, China, Denmark, Egypt, England, Germany, Hawaii, Iran and Norway
- Eupodes winsnesi Strandtmann & Sømme, 1977 – Antarctica
- Eupodes wisei Womersley & Strandtmann, 1963 – Antarctica
- Eupodes zaheri Abou-Awad, El-Sawaf & Abdel-Khalek, 2006 – Egypt
