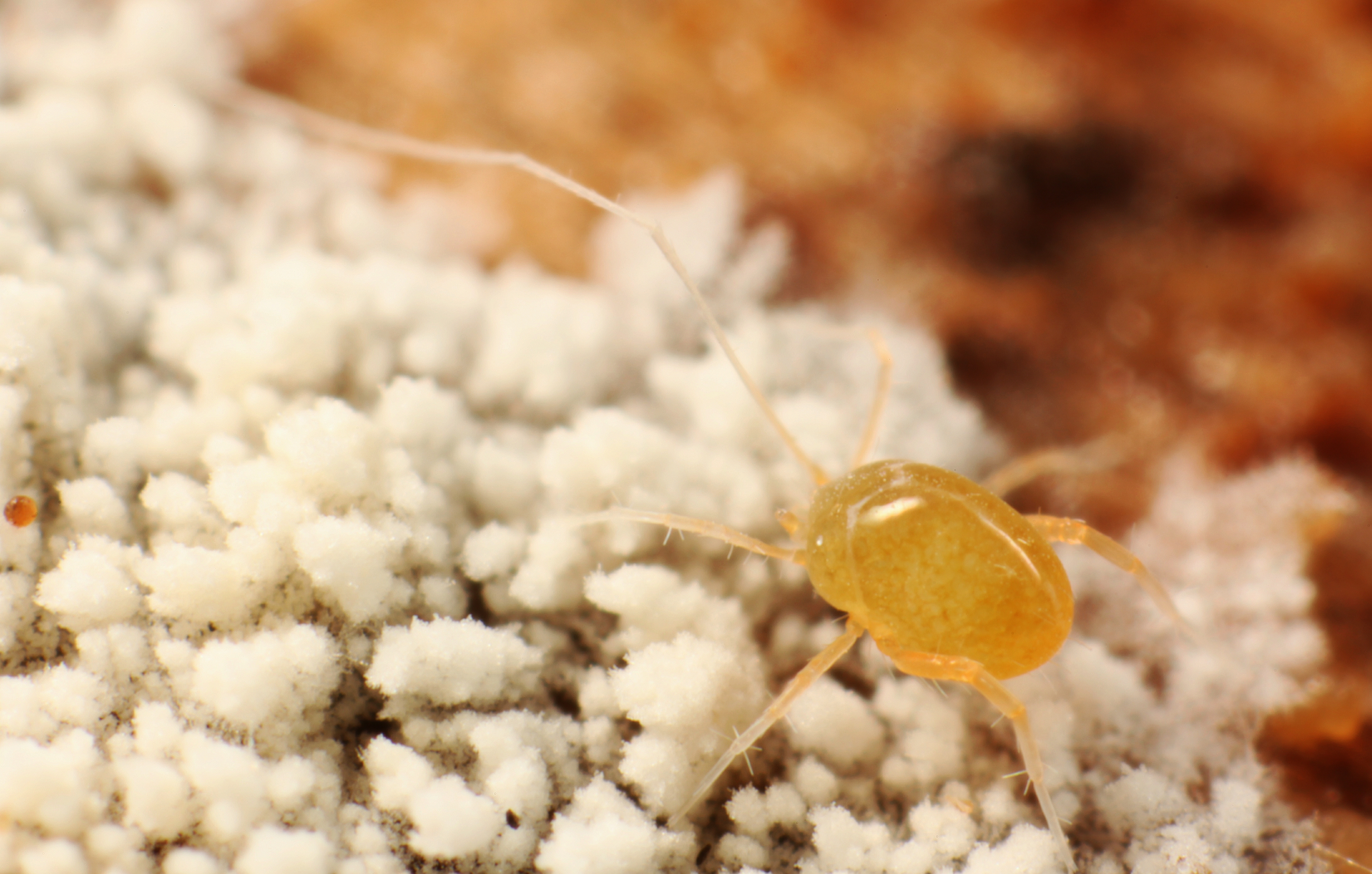
- Linopodes

Scientific classification
- Kingdom: Animalia
- Phylum: Arthropoda
- Subphylum: Chelicerata
- Class: Arachnida
- Order: Trombidiformes
- Superfamily: Eupodoidea
- Family: Cocceupodidae

= Cocceupodidae =

Family of mites

Cocceupodidae is a family of mites in the order Trombidiformes. There are at least 3 genera and about 23 described species in Cocceupodidae.

== Genera ==
Cocceupodidae genera according to the 2022 revision:

- Cocceupodes Thor, 1934
  - Cocceupodes australis Strandtmann & Tilbrook, 1968 – Deception Island (South Shetland Islands), Japan
  - Cocceupodes breweri Strandtmann, 1971 – USA (Alaska), Greenland
  - Cocceupodes communis Shiba, 1969 – Japan
  - Cocceupodes gracilongus Olivier & Theron, 2003 – South Africa
  - Cocceupodes longisolenidiatus Jesionowska, 2007 – Poland
  - Cocceupodes mollicellus (C.L. Koch, 1838) – Austria, Denmark, Germany, Italy, Norway, Hawaii, Greenland, Switzerland, Jan Mayen Island
  - Cocceupodes planiticus Shiba, 1978 – Japan
  - Cocceupodes stellatus Strandtmann & Prasse, 1977 – Germany, Greenland
- Filieupodes Jesionowska, 2010
  - Filieupodes aegyptiacus (Abou-Awad & El-Bagouri, 1984) – Egypt
  - Filieupodes filiformis Jesionowska, 2010 – Poland
  - Filieupodes filistellatus Jesionowska, 2010 – Poland
  - Filieupodes fusiformis (Olivier & Theron, 2003) – South Africa
  - Filieupodes paradoxus (Weis-Fogh, 1948) – England, Denmark, Greenland
  - Filieupodes sharkiensis (Abou-Awad, El-Sawaf & Abdel-Khalek, 2006) – Egypt
  - Filieupodes shepardi (Strandtmann, 1971) – USA (Alaska)
  - Filieupodes strandtmanni (Abou-Awad & El-Bagouri, 1986) – Egypt
  - Filieupodes trisetatus (Strandtmann & Prasse, 1977) – Germany, Hawaii
- Linopodes C.L. Koch, 1836
  - Linopodes antennaepes Banks, 1894 – Australia, Canada, Great Britain, Iran, Italy, USA
  - Linopodes barnufi Abou-Awad, Badawi, El-Sawaf & Abdel-Khalek, 2006 – Egypt
  - Linopodes cameronensis Shiba, 1976 – Iran, Malaysia
  - Linopodes eupodoides R. Canestrini, 1886 – Italy, Switzerland
  - Linopodes iwatensis Morikawa, 1963 – Japan
  - Linopodes kochi Thor, 1941 – Germany
  - Linopodes motatorius (Linnaeus, 1758) – Widespread in Europe (Austria, Bulgaria, Belgium, Croatia, Czech Republic, Denmark, Germany, Great Britain, Hungary, Iceland, Italy, Norway, Spain, Switzerland)
  - Linopodes motatorius africanus Meyer & Ryke, 1960 – South Africa
  - Linopodes obsoletus C.L. Koch, 1838 – Germany
  - Linopodes pubescens Morikawa, 1963 – Japan
  - Linopodes ravus C.L. Koch, 1836 – Germany
