= Penthalodidae =

Penthalodidae Temporal range: 38 MYA-Present

Scientific classification
- Kingdom: Animalia
- Phylum: Arthropoda
- Subphylum: Chelicerata
- Class: Arachnida
- Order: Trombidiformes
- Suborder: Prostigmata
- Infraorder: Eupodina
- Superfamily: Eupodoidea
- Family: Penthalodidae; Thor, 1933

Family of mites

Penthalodidae is a family of mites within the order Trombidiformes. Members in this family have been found in all continents, including Antarctica with members of Stereotydeus.

== Genera ==
- Callipenthalodes Qin, 1998
- Penthalodes Murray, 1877
- Protopenthalodes Jesionowska, 1989
- Stereotydeus Berlese, 1901
