= Odontoscirus =

- Odontoscirus insolita

Scientific classification
- Kingdom: Animalia
- Phylum: Arthropoda
- Subphylum: Chelicerata
- Class: Arachnida
- Order: Trombidiformes
- Family: Bdellidae
- Genus: Odontoscirus; Thor, 1913

Type species
- Odontoscirus virgulata (Canestrini & Fanzago, 1877)

Genus of mites

Odontoscirus is a genus of snout mites in the family Bdellidae.

== Species ==
Odontoscirus contains the following species:

- Odontoscirus affinis (Atyeo, 1963)
- Odontoscirus agrestis (Atyeo, 1963)
- Odontoscirus alacris (Atyeo, 1963)
- Odontoscirus alpinus Atyeo, 1960
- Odontoscirus amamiensis Shiba, 1985
- Odontoscirus ancalae (Atyeo, 1963)
- Odontoscirus angustifolius (Gupta, 1991)
- Odontoscirus annona (Tseng, 1978
- Odontoscirus asiaticus Kuznetsov & Barilo, 1984
- Odontoscirus atro (Gupta, 1991)
- Odontoscirus Atyeoi Michocka, 1987
- Odontoscirus augusta (Roy & Saha, 2010)
- Odontoscirus australicus (Womersley, 1933)
- Odontoscirus bidentata (Wallace & Mahon, 1976)
- Odontoscirus bifurcata (El-Sherif & Bolland, 1993)
- Odontoscirus bisetosa (Atyeo, 1960)
- Odontoscirus brevicornis (Cooremann, 1959)
- Odontoscirus bryi (Atyeo, 1963)
- Odontoscirus californica (Banks, 1904)
- Odontoscirus camellae (Atyeo, 1963)
- Odontoscirus communis (Atyeo, 1960)
- Odontoscirus conformis (Atyeo, 1963)
- Odontoscirus consanguinea (Atyeo, 1963)
- Odontoscirus copiosa (Atyeo, 1963)
- Odontoscirus currax (Atyeo, 1963)
- Odontoscirus curvus (Atyeo, 1963)
- Odontoscirus denheyeri Eghbalian, Khanjani and Ueckermann, 2017
- Odontoscirus dubitatus (Womersley, 1933)
- Odontoscirus edentata (Halliday, 2005)
- Odontoscirus exilicornis (Berlese, 1910)
- Odontoscirus flexuosa (Atyeo, 1963)
- Odontoscirus furcatus (Shiba, 1969)
- Odontoscirus georgianensis (Wallace, 1970)
- Odontoscirus graminis (Wallace & Mahon, 1976)
- Odontoscirus grandiflora (Gupta, 1991)
- Odontoscirus gressitti (Atyeo, 1964)
- Odontoscirus guajavae (Chatterjee & Gupta, 2002)
- Odontoscirus hadroseta (Wallace & Mahon, 1976)
- Odontoscirus haramotoi (Swift & Goff, 1987)
- Odontoscirus harpax (Atyeo, 1963)
- Odontoscirus hessei (Womersley, 1933)
- Odontoscirus hickmani (Womersley, 1933)
- Odontoscirus hospita (Banks, 1916)
- Odontoscirus hurdi (Atyeo, 1960)
- Odontoscirus hygrotes (Swift & Goff, 1987)
- Odontoscirus inflata (Wallace & Mahon, 1976)
- Odontoscirus infrequens (Atyeo, 1960)
- Odontoscirus insolita (Atyeo, 1960)
- Odontoscirus intermedius (Thor, 1928)
- Odontoscirus intricata (Atyeo, 1963)
- Odontoscirus iota Atyeo, 1960
- Odontoscirus iraniensis (Ueckermann, Rastegar, Saboori & Ostovan, 2007)
- Odontoscirus japonicus (Ehara, 1961)
- Odontoscirus kazeruni (Ostovan & Kamali, 1995)
- Odontoscirus koloseta (Wallace & Mahon, 1976)
- Odontoscirus lapidaria (Kramer, 1881)
- Odontoscirus livistonana Ali Khan & Anwarullah, 1970
- Odontoscirus longirostris (Hermann, 1804)
- Odontoscirus macquariensis (Atyeo, 1963)
- Odontoscirus malayensis Shiba, 1978
- Odontoscirus manipurensis (Gupta, 1991)
- Odontoscirus meridionalis (Thor, 1931)
- Odontoscirus montanus (Kuznetsov & Barilo, 1984)
- Odontoscirus multicia (Atyeo, 1963)
- Odontoscirus nimia (Atyeo, 1963)
- Odontoscirus nipponicus Shiba, 1985
- Odontoscirus odonata (Wallace & Mahon, 1976)
- Odontoscirus oraria (Atyeo, 1963)
- Odontoscirus pacifica (Atyeo, 1963)
- Odontoscirus paganus (Atyeo, 1963)
- Odontoscirus parvisetosa (Atyeo, 1977)
- Odontoscirus petila (Atyeo, 1963)
- Odontoscirus pilahensis (Shiba, 1978
- Odontoscirus porrectus (Kramer, 1898)
- Odontoscirus procincta (Atyeo, 1963)
- Odontoscirus quadrisetosa (Atyeo, 1977)
- Odontoscirus raeticus (Schweizer & Bader, 1963)
- Odontoscirus reticulata (Atyeo, 1960)
- Odontoscirus rhachia (Wallace, 1970)
- Odontoscirus sabulosa (Wallace & Mahon, 1976)
- Odontoscirus simplex (Atyeo, 1960)
- Odontoscirus spinosa (Atyeo, 1960)
- Odontoscirus serpentinus (Atyeo, 1963)
- Odontoscirus subterranea (Cooremann, 1959)
- Odontoscirus tanta (Atyeo, 1963)
- Odontoscirus tasmaniensis (Wallace & Mahon, 1976)
- Odontoscirus tellustris (Atyeo, 1963)
- Odontoscirus truncata (Atyeo, 1960)
- Odontoscirus vireti (Atyeo, 1963)
- Odontoscirus virgulata (Canestrini & Fanzago, 1877)
- Odontoscirus watsoni (Atyeo, 1963)
- Odontoscirus womersleyi (Atyeo, 1963)
