= Eriorhynchus australicus =

Scientific classification
- Kingdom: Animalia
- Phylum: Arthropoda
- Subphylum: Chelicerata
- Class: Arachnida
- Order: Trombidiformes
- Family: Eriorhynchidae
- Genus: Eriorhynchus
- Species: E. australicus

Binomial name
- Eriorhynchus australicus Womersley, 1941

Species of Arachnida

Eriorhynchus australicus is a species in the genus Eriorhynchus.
