= Bdella =

Scientific classification
- Kingdom: Animalia
- Phylum: Arthropoda
- Subphylum: Chelicerata
- Class: Arachnida
- Order: Trombidiformes
- Family: Bdellidae
- Genus: Bdella; Latreille, 1795

Genus of mites

Bdella is a genus of mites belonging to the family Bdellidae.

The species of this genus are found in Europe and Northern America.

The following species are assigned to the genus:

- Bdella aloios Van der Schyff, Theron & Ueckermann, 2005
- Bdella bakeri Gupta & Paul, 1985
- Bdella biroi Supino, 1894
- Bdella boskopensis Van der Schyff, Theron & Ueckermann, 2005
- Bdella captiosa Atyeo, 1963
- Bdella cardinalis Banks, 1894
- Bdella carolae Van der Schyff, Theron & Ueckermann, 2005
- Bdella consobrinae Van der Schyff, Theron & Ueckermann, 2005
- Bdella crassipes (C.L.) Koch, 1838
- Bdella cytoides Mihelcic, 1958
- Bdella dispar (C.L.) Koch, 1839
- Bdella distincta Baker & Balock, 1944
- Bdella dorsata Gervais, 1844
- Bdella farabii
- Bdella grandjeani Thor, 1931
- Bdella heliophila Mihelcic, 1958
- Bdella histrionica (C.L.) Koch, 1844
- Bdella horvathi Karpelles, 1888
- Bdella humida Wallace & Mahon, 1972
- Bdella iconica Berlese, 1923
- Bdella illinoisensis Ewing, 1909
- Bdella interrupta Evans, 1952
- Bdella karajiensis Ueckermann, Rastegar, Saboori & Ostovan, 2007
- Bdella khasyana Gupta, 1991
- Bdella lattakia Soliman & Zaher, 1975
- Bdella lignicola C.L.Koch
- Bdella longicornis (Linnaeus, 1758)
- Bdella longipalpus Mihelcic, 1958
- Bdella longistriata Atyeo, 1960
- Bdella malaccensis Shiba, 1978
- Bdella malawiensis Van der Schyff, Theron & Ueckermann, 2005
- Bdella maldahaensis Gupta, 1992
- Bdella muscorum Ewing, 1909
- Bdella neograndjeani Meyer & Ryke, 1959
- Bdella nihoaensis Swift & Goff, 1987
- Bdella nylsvleyensis Van der Schyff, Theron & Ueckermann, 2005
- Bdella phoenicea (C.L.) Koch, 1839
- Bdella piggotti Evans, 1953
- Bdella pinicola Cooreman, 1943
- Bdella pulchella Berlese, 1923
- Bdella radhikae Sadanandan, Shuresh & Ramani, 2009
- Bdella semiscutata Thor, 1930
- Bdella septentrionalis Atyeo & Tuxen, 1962
- Bdella spinirostris (C.L.) Koch, 1839
- Bdella spinirostris (C.L.Koch, 1839)
- Bdella strandi Berlese, 1923
- Bdella subulirostris Berlese, 1923
- Bdella taurica Kuznetzov & Livshitz, 1979
- Bdella tenuirostris (C.L.) Koch, 1839
- Bdella tlascalana Vitzthum, 1933
- Bdella trisetosa Jacot, 1938
- Bdella tropica Atyeo, 1960
- Bdella uchidai Ehara, 1961
- Bdella ueckermanni Hernandes, Daud & Feres, 2008
- Bdella utilis Banks, 1914
- Bdella validipes Berlese, 1923
- Bdella vatakarae Sadanandan, Shuresh & Ramani, 2009
- Bdella vates Van der Schyff, Theron & Ueckermann, 2005
- Bdella vetusta Ewing, 1934
- Bdella vivida (C.L.) Koch, 1839
