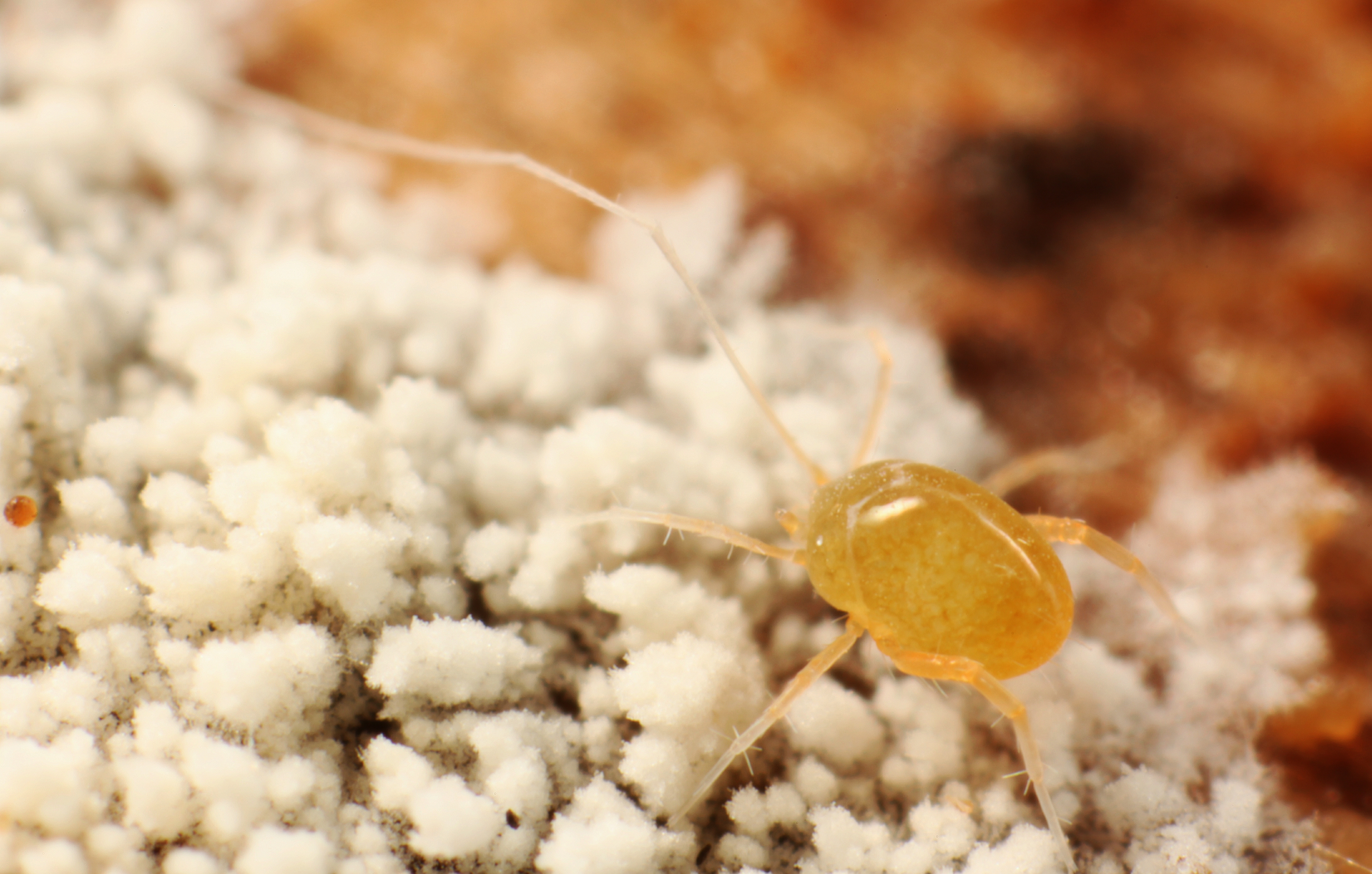
- A yellow Linopodes
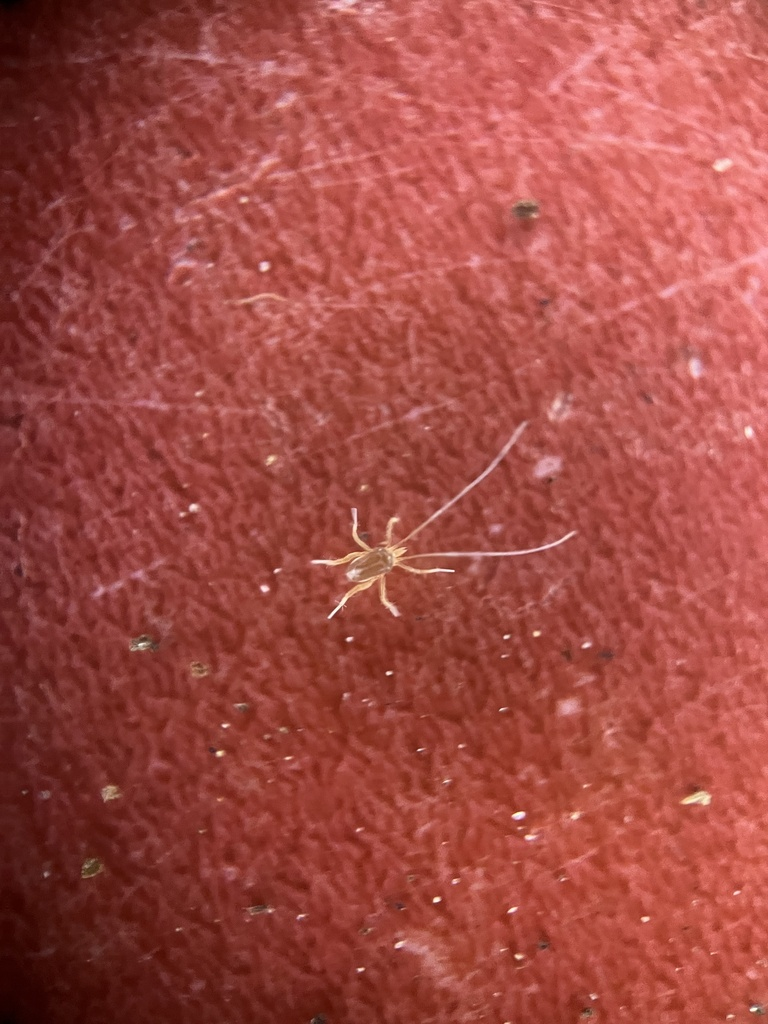
- A red Linopodes found on Town Mountain Rd, in Asheville, NC

Scientific classification
- Kingdom: Animalia
- Phylum: Arthropoda
- Subphylum: Chelicerata
- Class: Arachnida
- Order: Trombidiformes
- Family: Cocceupodidae
- Genus: Linopodes; C.L.Koch, 1835

= Linopodes =

Genus of mites

Linopodes is a cosmopolitan genus of mites in the family Cocceupodidae. These are large mites with oval bodies, usually reddish, yellowish or brownish, and with an extremely long (up to six times longer than the idiosoma) and flimsy first pair of legs.

Green colored Linopodes mites have been found a bit less frequently in North America.

== Habitat ==
Members of Linopodes are usually found in habitats such as forests, fields, meadows and the banks of ponds, occupying leaf litter, bark, and hiding places under stone. While common, they are not often observed; solitary habits and low densities contribute to this.

There are many different colored species found in North America. It is unknown the full diversity of North American Linopodes due to the fact that they do not preserve well because of their small size.

== Species ==
Species belonging to the genus Linopodes:

- Linopodes antennaepes Banks, 1894 – Australia, Canada, Great Britain, Iran, Italy, USA
- Linopodes barnufi Abou-Awad, Badawi, El-Sawaf & Abdel-Khalek, 2006 – Egypt
- Linopodes cameronensis Shiba, 1976 – Iran, Malaysia
- Linopodes eupodoides R. Canestrini, 1886 – Italy, Switzerland
- Linopodes iwatensis Morikawa, 1963 – Japan
- Linopodes kochi Thor, 1941 – Germany
- Linopodes motatorius (Linnaeus, 1758) – Europe
- Linopodes motatorius africanus Meyer & Ryke, 1960 – South Africa
- Linopodes obsoletus C.L. Koch, 1838 – Germany
- Linopodes pubescens Morikawa, 1963 – Japan
- Linopodes ravus C.L. Koch, 1836 – Germany

== Gallery ==
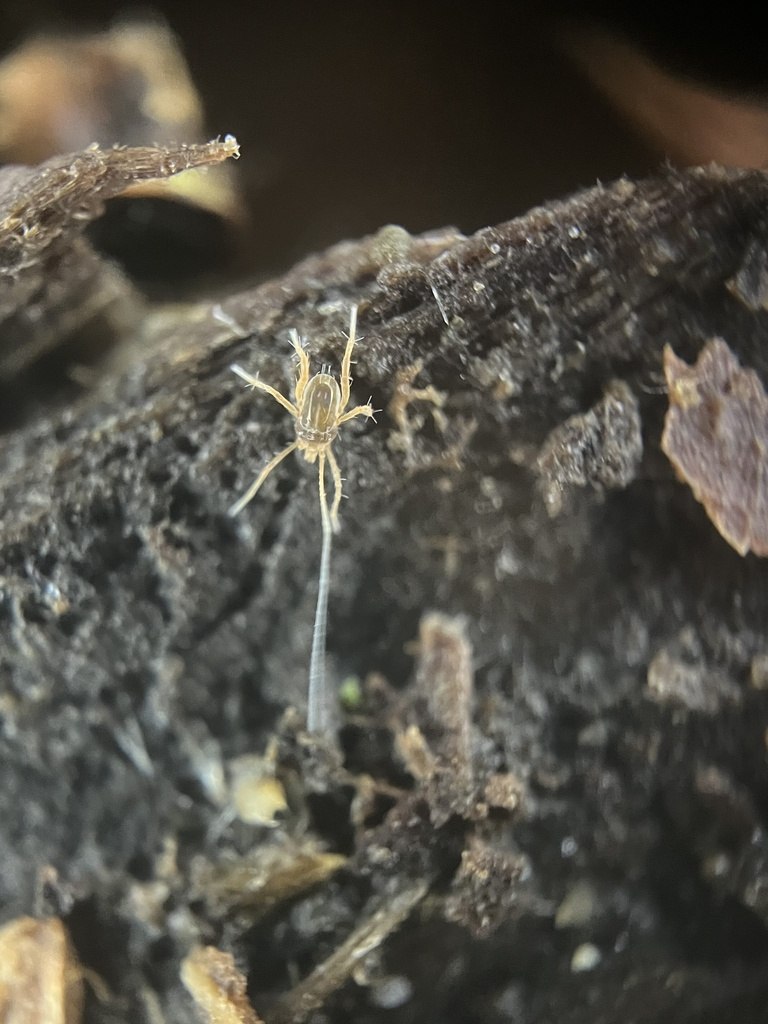
A small brown Linopodes mite found in Renton, WA

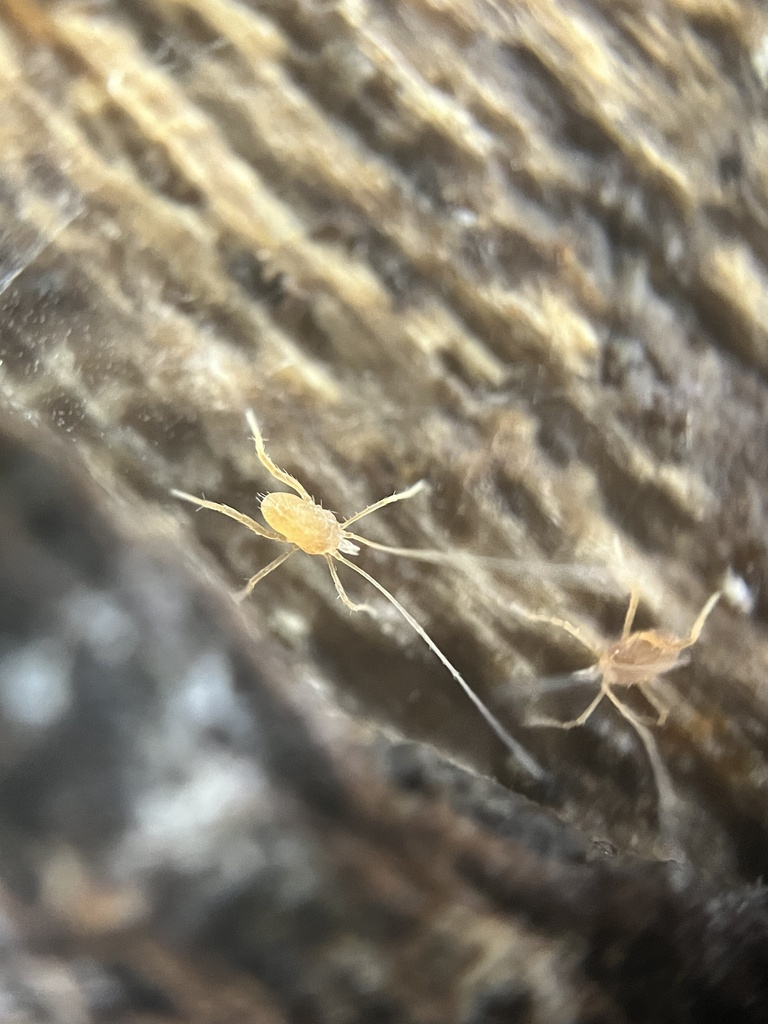
a small yellow Linopodes mite found in Renton, WA

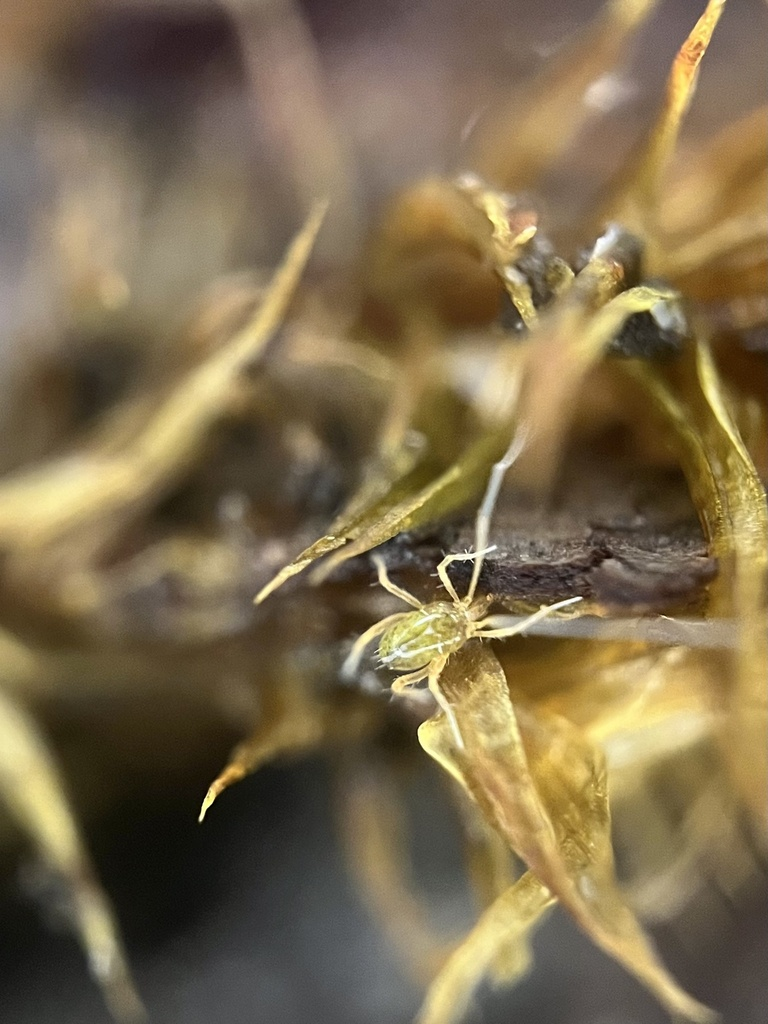
A brownish yellow Linopodes mite found on the Cedar River Trail, a local biking and walking trail in Renton, WA

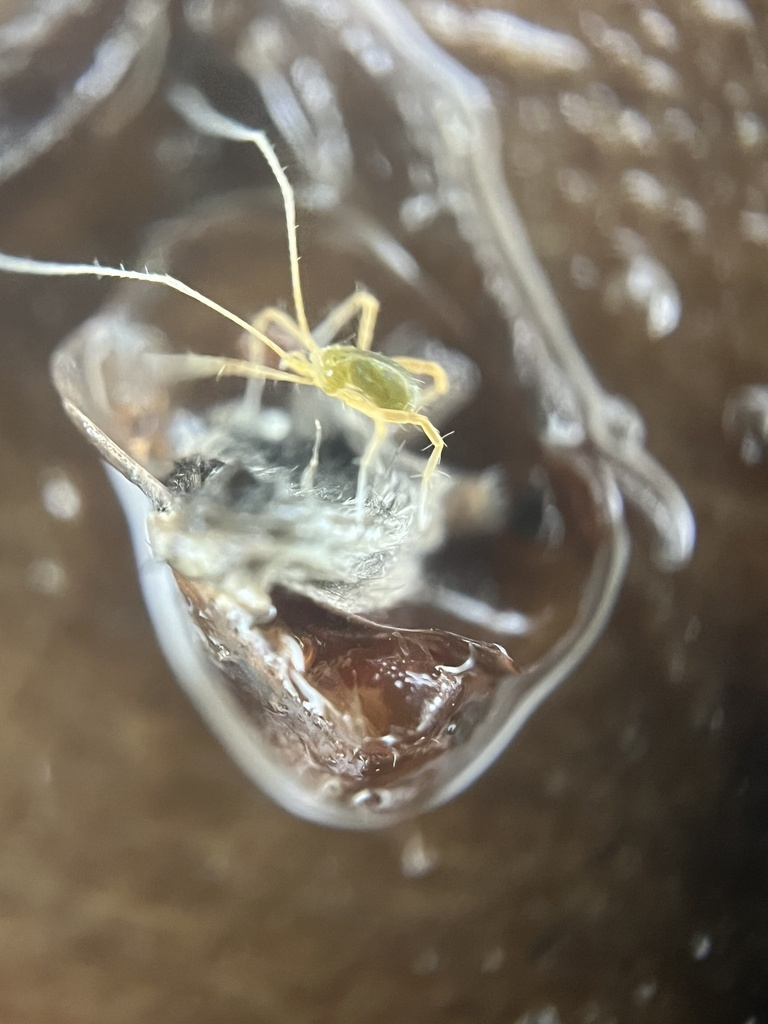
A green Linopodes mite found on the Bellevue Collage Campus, in Bellevue, Washington
