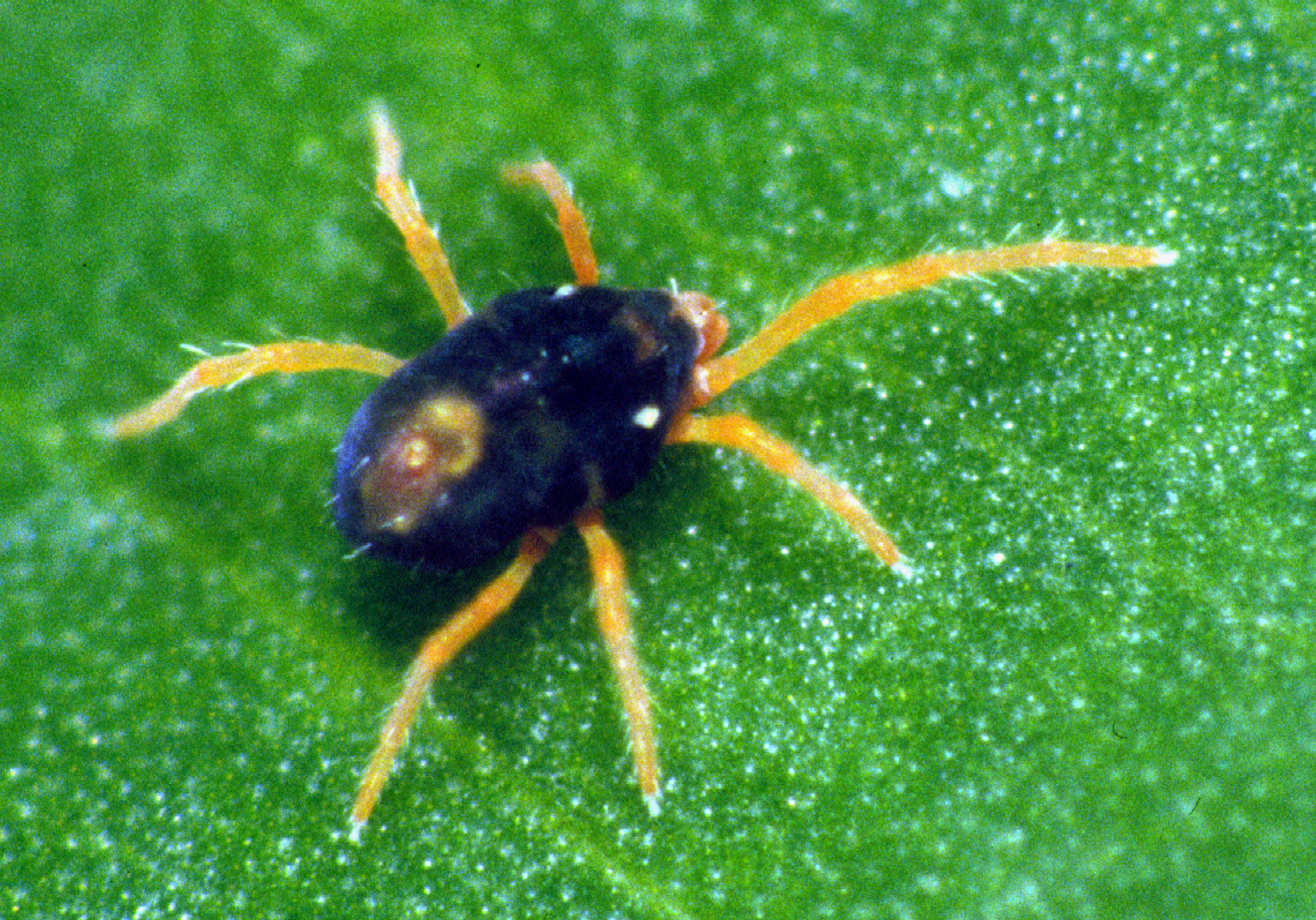
- Penthaleus major

Scientific classification
- Kingdom: Animalia
- Phylum: Arthropoda
- Subphylum: Chelicerata
- Class: Arachnida
- Order: Trombidiformes
- Family: Penthaleidae
- Genus: Penthaleus; Koch, 1835

= Penthaleus =

Genus of mites

Penthaleus is a genus of earth mites in the family of Penthaleidae, first described by Carl Ludwig Koch in 1835. Members of this genus are found on every continent except Antarctica.

They are a major winter pest of a variety of crops and pastures in southern Australia.

== Description ==
Members of Penthaleus can be easily distinguished from other genera within Penthaleidae by the dorsal position of the anus which is surrounded by a distinctive red patch on the otherwise blue-black idiosoma. They often also have red patches near the base of the gnathosoma, and at the anterior of the dorsal idiosoma. Like other genera within Penthaleidae, these mites have solid red legs.

== Species ==
Genus Penthaleus consists of 13 species:

- Penthaleus arcticus Trägårdh, 1901 - Norway
- Penthaleus bipustulatus (Hermann, 1804) - France and Germany
- Penthaleus crinitus Narayan, 1957 - Mexico
- Penthaleus dorsalis (Banks, 1902) - United States
- Penthaleus erythrocephalus C. L. Koch, 1838 - Germany and Spain
- Penthaleus falcatus Qin & Halliday, 1996 - New South Wales, Australia
- Penthaleus fallax (Dugès, 1834) - France
- Penthaleus guttatus C. L. Koch, 1838 - Germany
- Penthaleus longipilis (Canestrini, 1886) - England, Italy and Japan
- Penthaleus major (Dugès, 1834) - Cosmopolitan
- Penthaleus minor (Canestrini, 1886) - Australia, China, Great Britain, Germany, Iran, Italy and Switzerland
- Penthaleus saxatilis C. L. Koch, 1836 - Germany
- Penthaleus tectus Halloway, 2005 - East Australia
