= Eriorhynchus ramosus =

Scientific classification
- Kingdom: Animalia
- Phylum: Arthropoda
- Subphylum: Chelicerata
- Class: Arachnida
- Order: Trombidiformes
- Family: Eriorhynchidae
- Genus: Eriorhynchus
- Species: E. ramosus

Binomial name
- Eriorhynchus ramosus Qin & Halliday, 1997

Species of Arachnida

Eriorhynchus ramosus is a species in the genus Eriorhynchus.
