= Eriorhynchus =

Scientific classification
- Kingdom: Animalia
- Phylum: Arthropoda
- Subphylum: Chelicerata
- Class: Arachnida
- Order: Trombidiformes
- Superfamily: Eupodoidea
- Family: Eriorhynchidae; Qin & Halliday, 1997
- Genus: Eriorhynchus; Qin & Halliday, 1997

Genus of Arachnida

Eriorhynchus is a genus of mites in the monotypic family Eriorhynchidae.

== Species ==
Genus Eriorhynchus consists of the following 5 species:

- Eriorhynchus australicus (Womersley, 1941) - Victoria, Australia
- Eriorhynchus hades Qin & Halliday, 1997 - Victoria, Australia
- Eriorhynchus ramosus Qin & Halliday, 1997 - Tasmania, Australia
- Eriorhynchus walteri Qin & Halliday, 1997 - Queensland, Australia
- Eriorhynchus womersleyi Qin & Halliday, 1997 - New South Wales, Australia
