= Eriorhynchus womersleyi =

Scientific classification
- Kingdom: Animalia
- Phylum: Arthropoda
- Subphylum: Chelicerata
- Class: Arachnida
- Order: Trombidiformes
- Family: Eriorhynchidae
- Genus: Eriorhynchus
- Species: E. womersleyi

Binomial name
- Eriorhynchus womersleyi Qin & Halliday, 1997

Species of mite

Eriorhynchus womersleyi is a species of mite in the genus Eriorhynchus.
