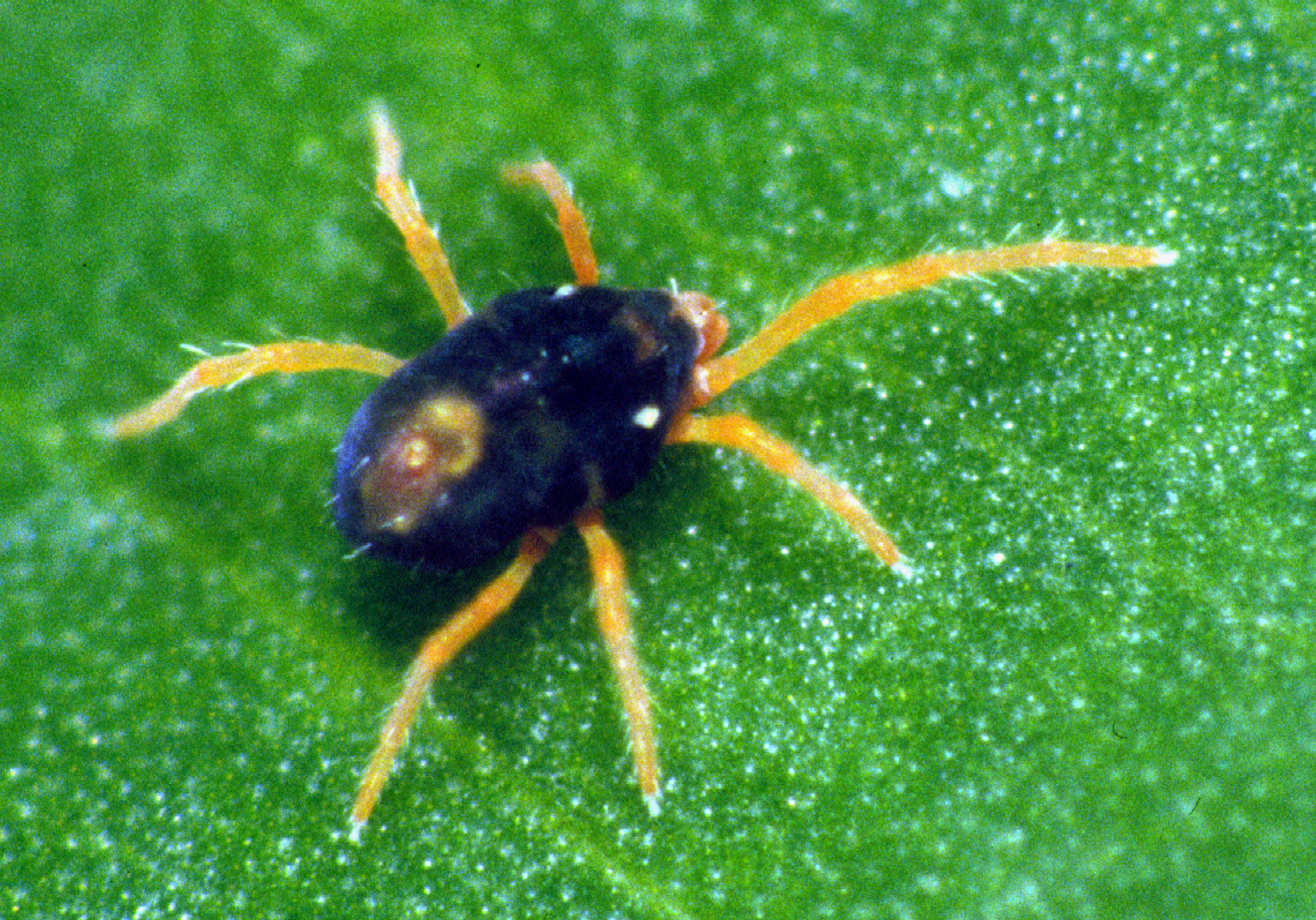
- Penthaleus major

Scientific classification
- Kingdom: Animalia
- Phylum: Arthropoda
- Subphylum: Chelicerata
- Class: Arachnida
- Order: Trombidiformes
- Superfamily: Eupodoidea
- Family: Penthaleidae; Oudemans, 1931

Diversity
- 6 genera ~29 species

= Penthaleidae =

Family of mites

Penthaleidae, also referred to as earth mites, are a family of mites found on every continent. They are major winter pests of a variety of crops and pastures in southern Australia.

== Genera ==
Penthaleidae genera according to the 2022 revision:

- Chromotydaeus Berlese, 1903
  - Chromotydaeus anauniensis (R. Canestrini, 1886) - Italy
  - Chromotydaeus egregius (Berlese, 1891) - Italy
  - Chromotydaeus illustris (Berlese, 1916) - Italy
  - Chromotydaeus quartus Qin & Halliday, 1996 - Western Australia
  - Chromotydaeus similis Mihelcic, 1958 - Spain
- Halotydeus Berlese, 1891
  - Halotydeus anthropus Qin & Halliday, 1996 - South Africa
  - Halotydeus bakerae Qin & Halliday, 1996 - South Australia
  - Halotydeus castellus Qin & Halliday, 1996 - New South Wales, Australia
  - Halotydeus destructor (R. W. Jack, 1908) - South Africa and Australia
  - Halotydeus hydrodromus (Berlese & Trouessart, 1889) - England, France, Ireland and Italy
  - Halotydeus mollis Luxton, 1990 - Hong Kong
  - Halotydeus signiensis Strandtmann & Tilbrook, 1968 - South Orkney Islands
  - Halotydeus spectatus Qin & Halliday, 1996 - New South Wales, Australia
- Linopenthaleus Willmann, 1951
  - Linopenthaleus irki Willmann, 1951 - Austria and Switzerland
- Linopenthaloides Strandtmann, 1981
  - Linopenthaloides novazealandicus Strandtmann, 1981 - New Zealand
- Penthaleus C.L. Koch, 1836
  - Penthaleus arcticus Trägårdh, 1901 - Norway
  - Penthaleus bipustulatus (Hermann, 1804) - France and Germany
  - Penthaleus crinitus Narayan, 1957 - Mexico
  - Penthaleus dorsalis (Banks, 1902) - United States
  - Penthaleus erythrocephalus C. L. Koch, 1838 - Germany and Spain
  - Penthaleus falcatus Qin & Halliday, 1996 - New South Wales, Australia
  - Penthaleus fallax (Dugès, 1834) - France
  - Penthaleus guttatus C. L. Koch, 1838 - Germany
  - Penthaleus longipilis (Canestrini, 1886) - England, Italy and Japan
  - Penthaleus major (Dugès, 1834) - Cosmopolitan
  - Penthaleus minor (Canestrini, 1886) - Australia, China, Great Britain, Germany, Iran, Italy and Switzerland
  - Penthaleus saxatilis C. L. Koch, 1836 - Germany
  - Penthaleus tectus Halloway, 2005 - East Australia
- Turanopenthalodes Barilo, 1988
  - Turanopenthalodes polytrichus Barilo, 1988 - Uzbekistan
