= Eupodes wisei =

Scientific classification
- Kingdom: Animalia
- Phylum: Arthropoda
- Subphylum: Chelicerata
- Class: Arachnida
- Order: Trombidiformes
- Family: Eupodidae
- Genus: Eupodes
- Species: E. wisei

Binomial name
- Eupodes wisei Womersley & Strandtmann, 1963

Species of mite

Eupodes wisei is a species of mite belonging to the family Eupodidae. The species was first described by Herbert Womersley and Russell W. Strandtmann in 1963, and is found in Victoria Land, Antarctica.

== Taxonomy ==
The species was first described by Herbert Womersley and Russell W. Strandtmann in 1963, who named the species after New Zealand entomologist Keith Arthur John Wise, who had discovered the holotype of the species under stones in the skua rookery at Hallett Station, Victoria Land, Antarctica.

== Distribution and habitat ==
The species is found Victoria Land, Antarctica. The species is typically found on the undersides of stones.
