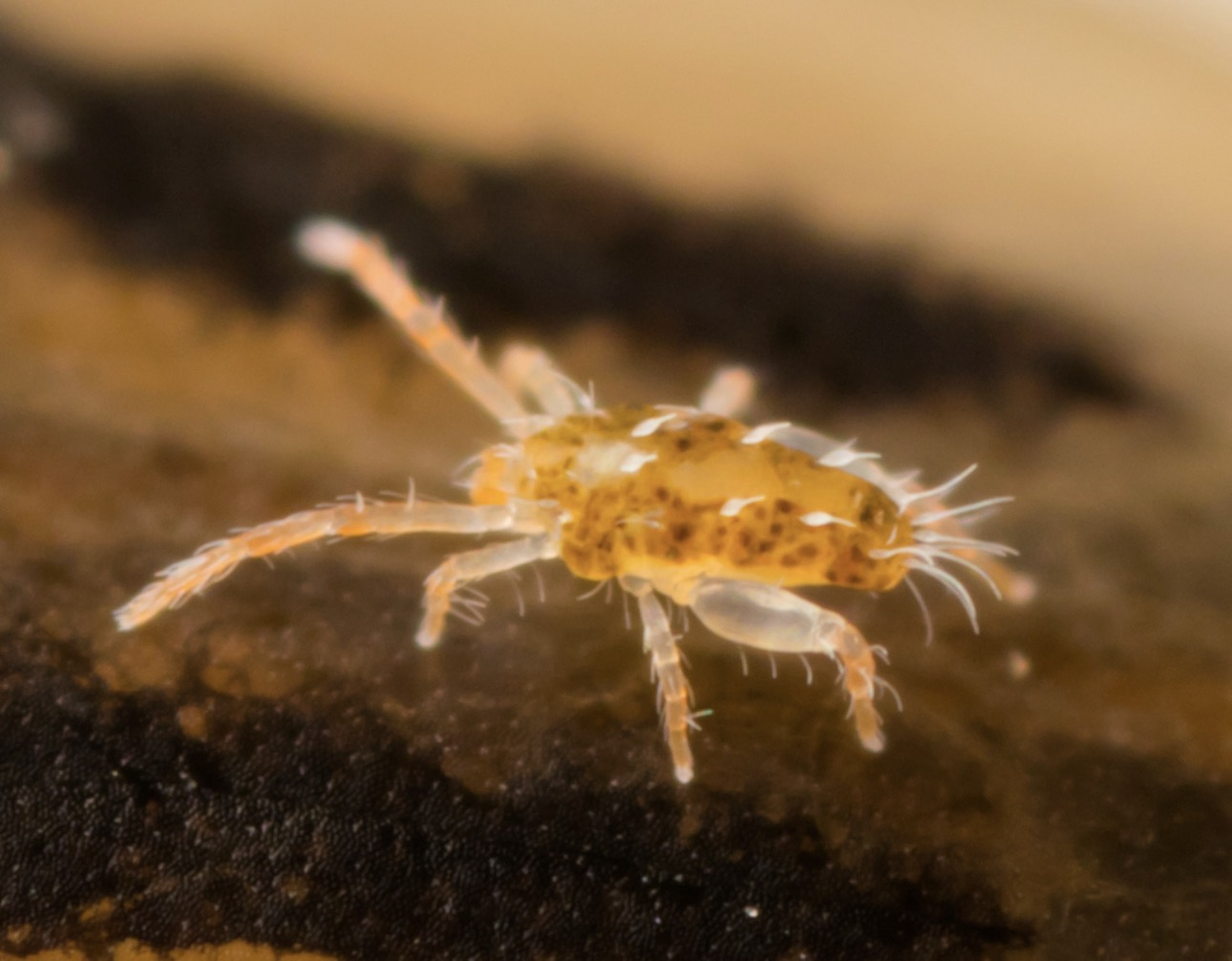
- Eupodes sp. in Hong Kong

Scientific classification
- Kingdom: Animalia
- Phylum: Arthropoda
- Subphylum: Chelicerata
- Class: Arachnida
- Order: Trombidiformes
- Superfamily: Eupodoidea
- Family: Eupodidae

= Eupodidae =

Family of mites

Eupodidae is a family in the order Trombidiformes. There are at least 11 genera and 110 described species in Eupodidae.

== Genera ==
Eupodidae genera according to the 2022 revision:

- Aethosolenia Baker & Lindquist, 2002
  - Aethosolenia laselvensis Baker & Lindquist, 2002 – Costa Rica
- Benoinyssus Fain, 1958
  - Benoinyssus celatus Olivier & Theron, 1997 – Angola
  - Benoinyssus ereynetoides (Strandtmann & Prasse, 1976) – Germany, Spain
  - Benoinyssus falcatus Olivier & Theron, 1997 – South Africa
  - Benoinyssus momeni (Abou-Awad, 1984) – Egypt
  - Benoinyssus najae Fain, 1958 – Rwanda
  - Benoinyssus oconnori Bizarro Wurlitzer & Da Silva, 2020 – Brazil
  - Benoinyssus ornatus Olivier & Theron, 1997 – Angola, Eswatini and South Africa
  - Benoinyssus pusillus Olivier & Theron, 1997 – South Africa
  - Benoinyssus serratus Olivier & Theron, 1997 – Botswana, Namibia, South Africa and Eswatini
  - Benoinyssus tuberculatus (Baker, 1945) – Mexico
- Caleupodes A. Baker, 1987
  - Caleupodes reticulatus A. Baker, 1987 – England
- Claveupodes Strandtmann & Prasse, 1977
  - Claveupodes delicatus Strandtmann & Prasse, 1977 – Germany and New Zealand
- Echinoeupodes Khaustov, 2017
  - Echinoeupodes echinus Khaustov, 2017 – Crimea, Russia
  - Echinoeupodes turgidus (Shiba, 1978) – Japan
- Eupodes C.L. Koch, 1835
  - Eupodes acanthus Olivier & Theron, 1998 – South Africa
  - Eupodes alaskanensis Strandtmann, 1971 – Alaska, United States
  - Eupodes angardi Strandtmann & Sømme, 1977 – Antarctica
  - Eupodes bakeri Abou-Awad, El-Sawaf & Abdel-Khalek, 2006 – Egypt
  - Eupodes berensis Shiba, 1976 – Malaysia
  - Eupodes berlesei Thor, 1912 – Denmark, Italy and Switzerland
  - Eupodes brevipes Banks, 1916 – California, United States
  - Eupodes callejae Corpuz-Raros, 2005 – Philippines (Leyte and Luzon)
  - Eupodes cordiformis Shiba, 1978 – Japan
  - Eupodes crozetensis Strandtmann & Davies, 1972 – Iran and Crozet Islands
  - Eupodes exiguus Booth, Edwards & Usher, 1985 – South Orkney Islands
  - Eupodes fusifer R. Canestrini, 1886 – Italy
  - Eupodes fusiferellus Meyer & Ryke, 1960 – South Africa
  - Eupodes garciai Corpuz-Raros, 2005 – Philippines (Luzon and Leyte)
  - Eupodes ghardagae Schuster, 1965 – Egypt
  - Eupodes gilvus C.L. Koch, 1838 – Germany
  - Eupodes haltica (Haller, 1880) – Switzerland
  - Eupodes hamatus Olivier & Theron, 1997 – South Africa
  - Eupodes hawaiiensis Strandtmann & Goff, 1978 – Hawaii, United States
  - Eupodes hiemalis C.L. Koch, 1838 – Germany and Iceland
  - Eupodes hjartdaliae Thor, 1934 – Norway
  - Eupodes iconicus C.L. Koch, 1838 – Germany and Italy
  - Eupodes indentatus Olivier & Theron, 1997 – South Africa
  - Eupodes infirmus Shiba, 1978 – Japan
  - Eupodes leucomelas C.L. Koch, 1838 – Germany
  - Eupodes littoralis Shiba, 1978 – Japan
  - Eupodes longipilus Thor, 1934 – South Africa
  - Eupodes longisetatus Strandtmann, 1964 – Japan and Campbell Island, New Zealand
  - Eupodes lumbarus Shiba, 1976 – Malaysia
  - Eupodes lutatus Olivier & Theron, 1997 – South Africa
  - Eupodes marinus Banks, 1896 – USA
  - Eupodes milvinus C.L. Koch, 1838 – Germany, Italy, Netherlands and Sweden
  - Eupodes minipilus Olivier & Theron, 1998 – Botswana, Cabo Verde, South Africa and Zimbabwe
  - Eupodes minutus (Strandtmann, 1967) – South Georgia, Macquarie Island and New Zealand
  - Eupodes niloticus Abou-Awad & El-Bagouri, 1985 – Egypt
  - Eupodes ocellatus Willmann, 1952 – Germany
  - Eupodes oedipus Oudemans, 1937 – Germany
  - Eupodes okinoshimaensis Shiba, 1978 – Japan
  - Eupodes onoi Shiba, 1976 – Singapore and Malaysia
  - Eupodes parafusifer Meyer & Ryke, 1960 – Angola and South Africa
  - Eupodes parvus Booth, Edwards & Usher, 1985 – South Orkney Islands
  - Eupodes pasohensis Shiba, 1976 – Malaysia
  - Eupodes pseudoclavifrons R. Canestrini, 1886 – Austria, Italy and Switzerland
  - Eupodes pseudolumbarus Shiba, 1976 – Malaysia, Philippines
  - Eupodes pusillus Shiba, 1976 – Malaysia, Philippines
  - Eupodes riedli Schuster, 1965 – Crozet Islands, Antarctica
  - Eupodes sigmoidensis Strandtmann & Goff, 1978 – Hawaii, India, Iran and Cote D’ivoire
  - Eupodes signatus C.L. Koch, 1835 – Germany
  - Eupodes skiaaki Thor, 1934 – Norway
  - Eupodes strandtmanni Coineau, 1976 – France
  - Eupodes striola C.L. Koch, 1836 – Germany
  - Eupodes temperatus Shiba, 1978 – Egypt and Japan
  - Eupodes tottanfjella Strandtmann, 1967 – Antarctica
  - Eupodes trifasciatus C.L. Koch, 1838 – Germany
  - Eupodes unifasciatus C.L. Koch, 1838 – England and Germany
  - Eupodes vallombrosae Thor, 1934 – Italy, Switzerland and Spain
  - Eupodes variegatus C.L. Koch, 1838 – Austria, England, Germany, Greenland, Ireland, Iceland, Israel, Italy, Norway, South Africa, Spain, Sweden and Jan Mayen Island
  - Eupodes versicolor C.L. Koch, 1838 – Germany
  - Eupodes viridis Oudemans, 1906 – Greenland
  - Eupodes voxencollinus Thor, 1934 – Alaska, Canada, China, Denmark, Egypt, England, Germany, Hawaii, Iran and Norway
  - Eupodes winsnesi Strandtmann & Sømme, 1977 – Antarctica
  - Eupodes wisei Womersley & Strandtmann, 1963 – Antarctica
  - Eupodes zaheri Abou-Awad, El-Sawaf & Abdel-Khalek, 2006 – Egypt
- Neoprotereunetes Fain & Camerik, 1994
  - Neoprotereunetes lapidarius (Oudemans, 1906) – Netherlands
- Niveupodes Barilo, 1991
  - Niveupodes niveus Barilo, 1991 – Uzbekistan
- Pseudeupodes Khaustov, 2014
  - Pseudeupodes porosus Khaustov, 2014 – Crimea, Russia
- Pseudopenthaleus Khaustov, 2015
  - Pseudopenthaleus ciliatus (Shiba, 1978) – Japan
  - Pseudopenthaleus tauricus Khaustov, 2015 – Crimea, Russia
- Xerophiles Jesionowska, 2003
  - Xerophiles ereynetoidalis Jesionowska, 2003 – Poland and Slovakia
