= Neomolgus =

Scientific classification
- Kingdom: Animalia
- Phylum: Arthropoda
- Subphylum: Chelicerata
- Class: Arachnida
- Order: Trombidiformes
- Family: Bdellidae
- Genus: Neomolgus; Oudemans, 1938

Genus of mites

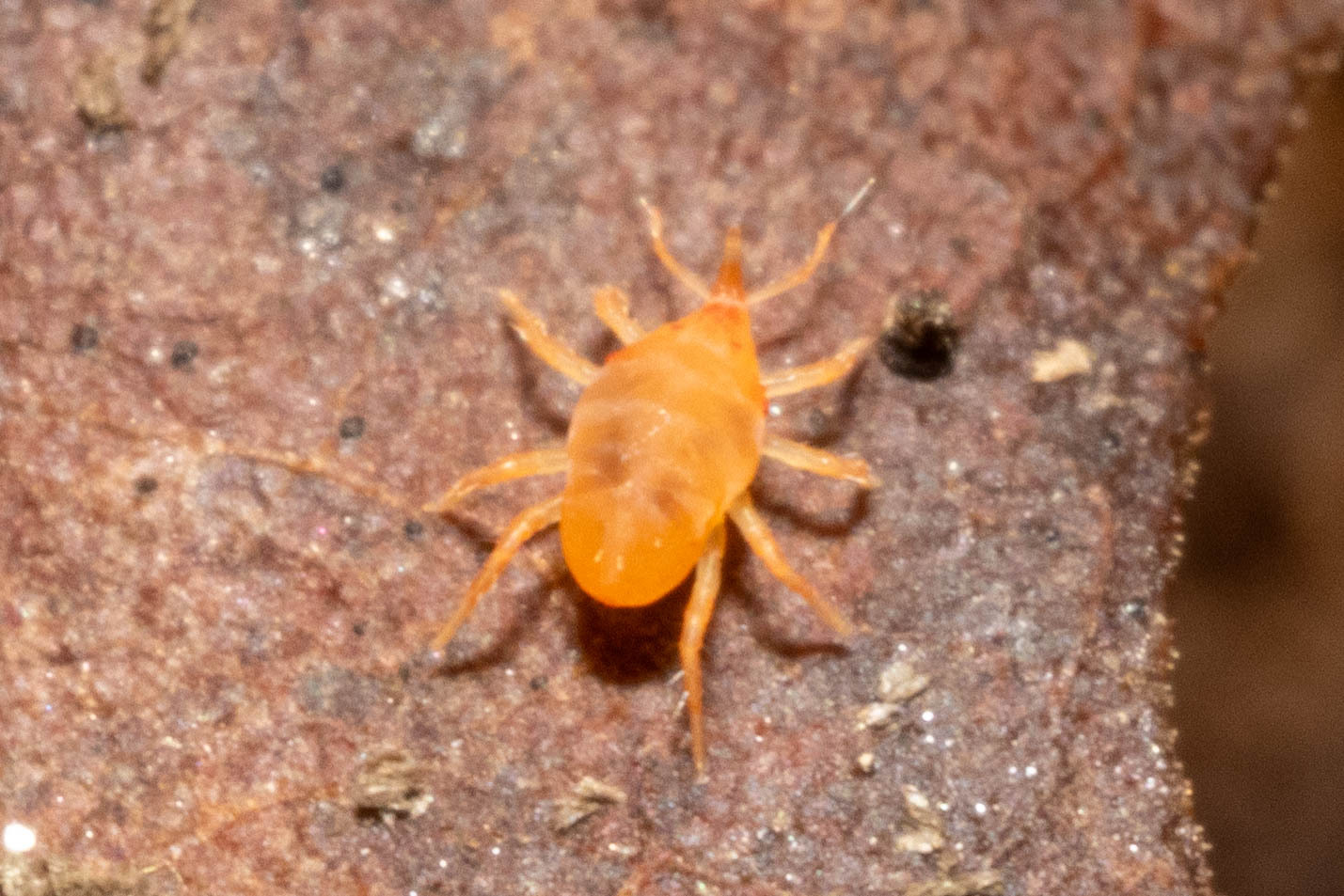
Neomolgus littoralis in Atlanta, United States

Neomolgus is a genus of snout mites in the family Bdellidae. There are more than 20 described species in Neomolgus.

== Species ==
These 29 species belong to the genus Neomolgus:

- Neomolgus aegyptiacus Soliman, 1975
- Neomolgus aequalis (Schweizer & Bader, 1963)
- Neomolgus anomalicornis (Berlese, 1916)
- Neomolgus berlesei (Trägårdh, 1902)
- Neomolgus calandroides (Murray, 1878)
- Neomolgus capillatus (Kramer, 1881)
- Neomolgus clypeatus (Thor, 1930)
- Neomolgus egregius Koch, 1839 (C.L.)
- Neomolgus helveticus (Schweizer & Bader, 1963)
- Neomolgus iraniensis Eghbalian, Khanjani, Safaralizadeh & Ueckermann
- Neomolgus lacustris (Hull, 1915)
- Neomolgus littoralis (Linnaeus)
- Neomolgus longipalpis (Karpelles, 1893)
- Neomolgus longipalpus Kuznetzov, 1984
- Neomolgus lumarius Atyeo & Tuxen, 1962
- Neomolgus maculatus (Karpelles, 1893)
- Neomolgus monticola Willmann, 1951
- Neomolgus mutabilis Atyeo, 1960
- Neomolgus obsoletus (Berlese, 1923)
- Neomolgus opimus (Berlese, 1923)
- Neomolgus pallipes Koch, 1879 (L.)
- Neomolgus paracappilatus Michocka, 1987
- Neomolgus peragilis (Berlese, 1923)
- Neomolgus pygmaeus Shiba, 1969
- Neomolgus raeticus (Schweizer & Bader, 1963)
- Neomolgus raptor Kuznetzov & Barilo, 1984
- Neomolgus reticulatus (Schweizer & Bader, 1963)
- Neomolgus thorianus (Berlese, 1923)
- Neomolgus venetus Lombardini, 1960
