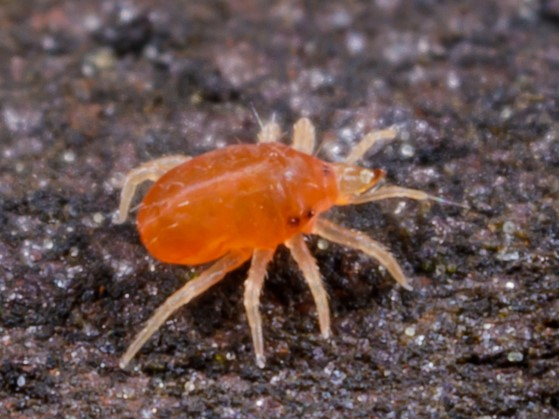

Scientific classification
- Kingdom: Animalia
- Phylum: Arthropoda
- Subphylum: Chelicerata
- Class: Arachnida
- Order: Trombidiformes
- Family: Bdellidae
- Genus: Cyta von Heyden, 1826

= Cyta (mite) =

Genus of mites

Cyta is a genus of snout mites in the family Bdellidae. There are about 15 described species in the genus Cyta.

== Species ==
- Cyta americana Banks, 1902
- Cyta brevipalpa Ewing, 1909
- Cyta coerulipes (Dugès, 1834)
- Cyta flava Mihelcic, 1958
- Cyta grandjeani Gomelauri, 1963
- Cyta ignea (Tseng, 1978)
- Cyta kauaiensis Swift & Goff, 1987
- Cyta latirostris (Hermann, 1804)
- Cyta longiseta Wallace & Mahon, 1972
- Cyta magdalenae Den Heyer, 1981
- Cyta murrayi Den Heyer, 1981
- Cyta quadrisetosus Den Heyer, 1981
- Cyta reticulata Soliman & Zaher, 1975
- Cyta spuria Atyeo, 1960
- Cyta troglodyta Hernandes, Bernardi & Ferreira, 2011
