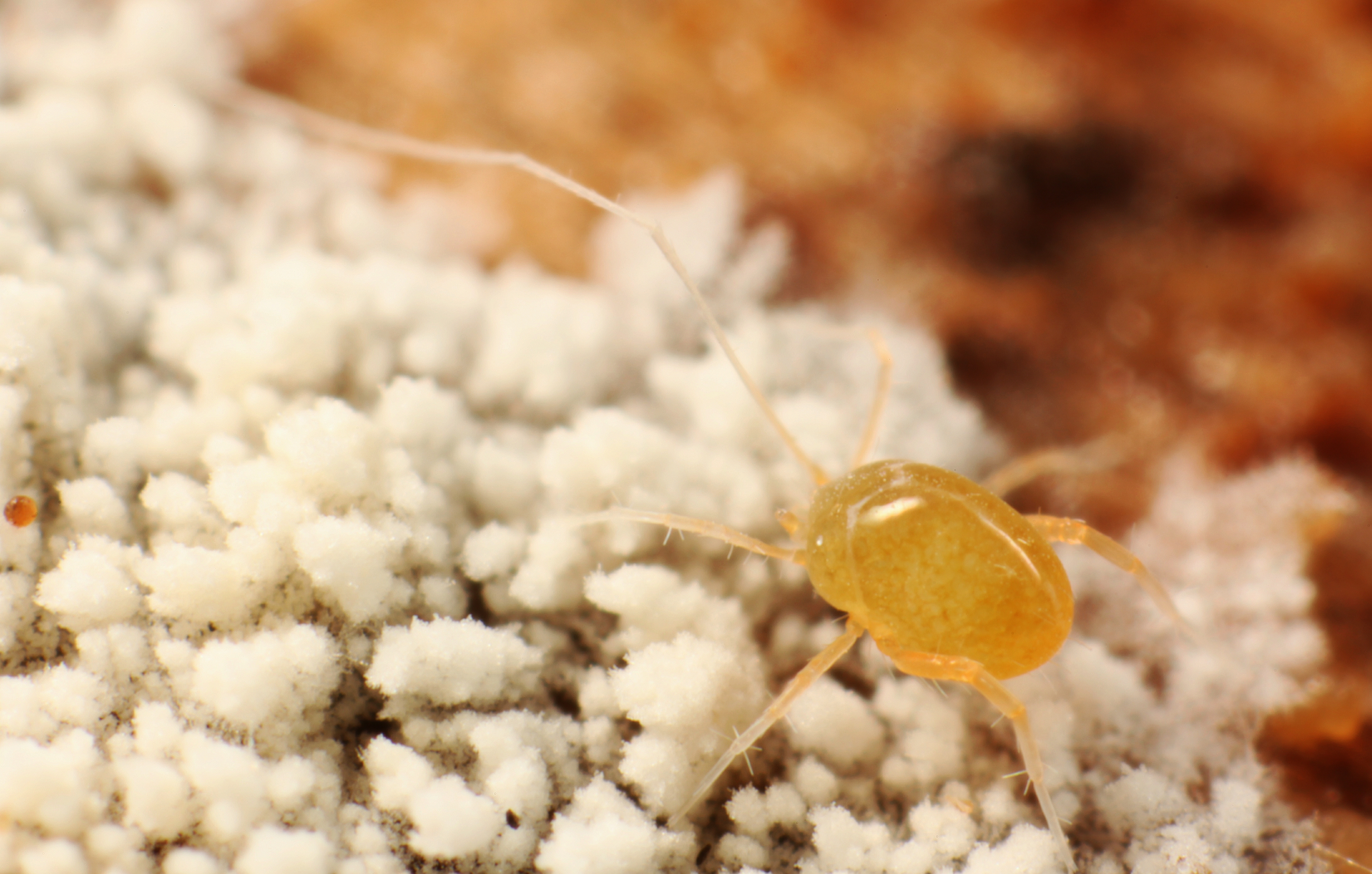
- Linopodes

Scientific classification
- Kingdom: Animalia
- Phylum: Arthropoda
- Subphylum: Chelicerata
- Class: Arachnida
- Order: Trombidiformes
- Infraorder: Eupodina
- Superfamily: Eupodoidea

= Eupodoidea =

Eupodoidea Temporal range: Palaeogene–present

Superfamily of mites

Eupodoidea is a superfamily of mites in the order Trombidiformes. There are about 8 families and more than 160 described species in Eupodoidea.

== Description ==
Eupodoids are soft-bodied mites that are red, red and black, white or yellow in colour. They can be recognised by the small epivertical lobe on the propodosoma and rhagidial organs on the tarsi of the first two leg pairs.

== Ecology ==
Eupodoids occur in temperate grasslands, deserts (both hot and cold), alpine regions and polar regions (including tundra). Less commonly, they can be found in marshes and heavily wooded areas (including rainforests).

The superfamily includes fungivorous, phytophagous and predatory species. For example, Cocceupodidae and Eupodidae are fungivorous, Penthaleidae are phytophagous (and include some crop pests) and Rhagidiidae are fast-moving predators of small arthropods.

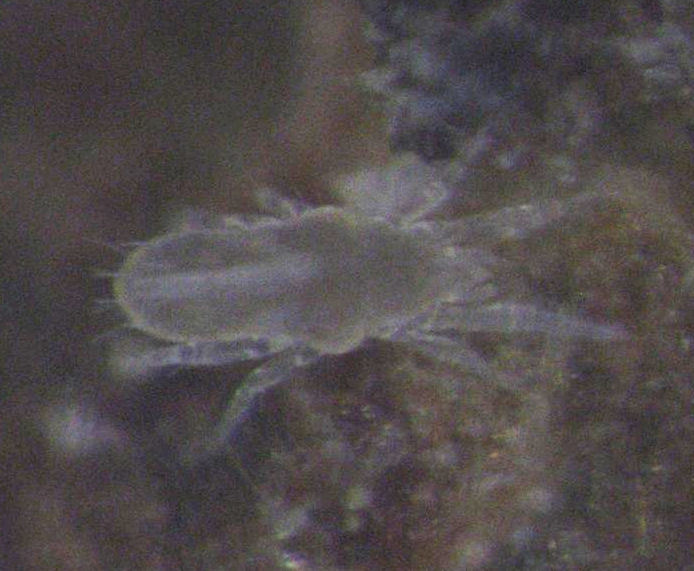
Rhagidiidae

== Families ==
These nine families belong to the superfamily Eupodoidea:

- Cocceupodidae
- Dendrochaetidae
- Eriorhynchidae
- Eupodidae
- Pentapalpidae
- Penthaleidae (earth mites)
- Penthalodidae
- Rhagidiidae
- Strandtmanniidae
