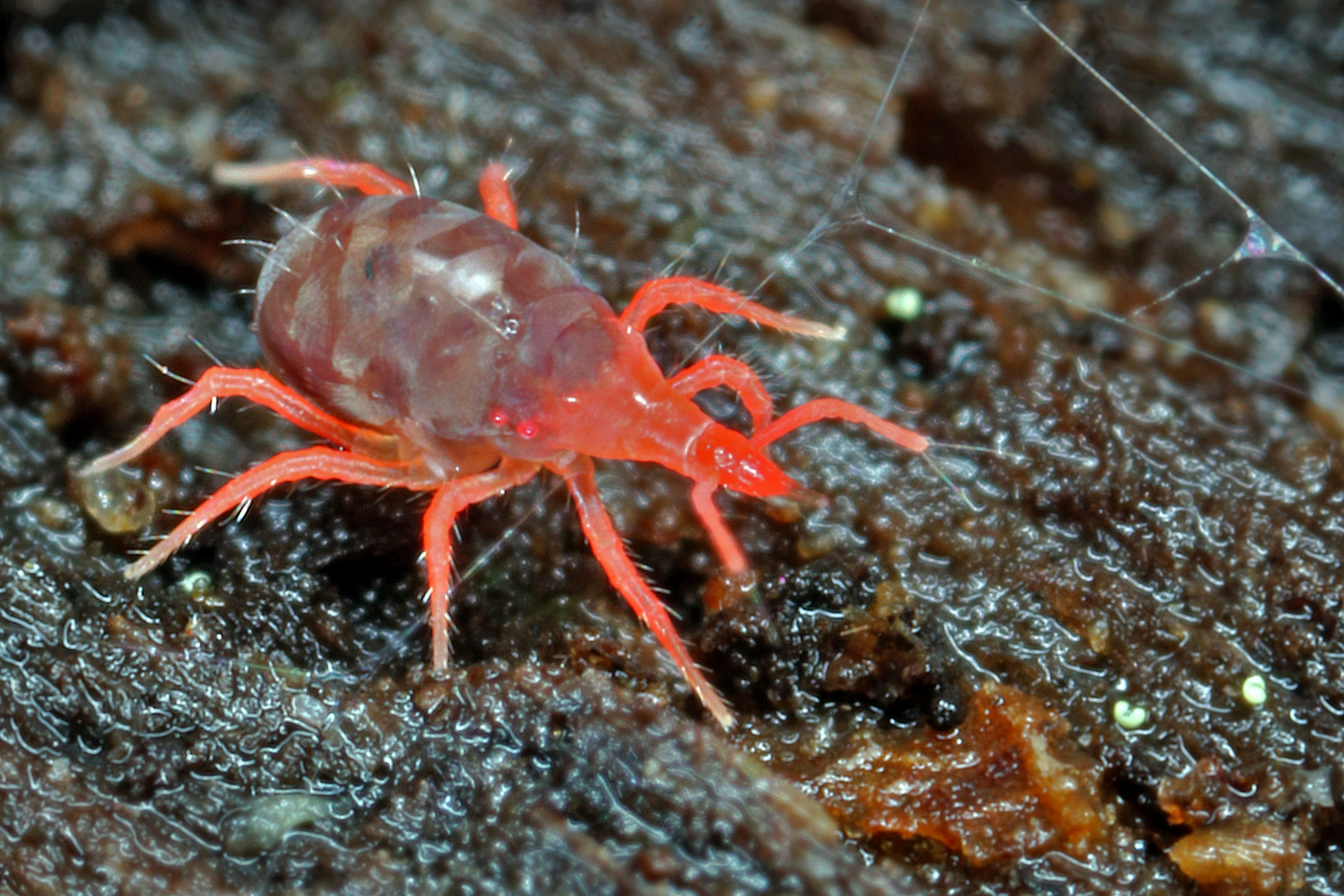
- Bdellodes longirostris

Scientific classification
- Kingdom: Animalia
- Phylum: Arthropoda
- Subphylum: Chelicerata
- Class: Arachnida
- Order: Trombidiformes
- Superfamily: Bdelloidea
- Family: Bdellidae; Dugès, 1834

= Bdellidae =

Bdellidae Temporal range: Cretaceous–present

Family of mites

Bdellidae is a family of snout mites in the order Trombidiformes. There are about 11 genera and at least 260 described species in Bdellidae.

In terms of size, they are medium to large-sized predatory mites. They are known to inhabit soil, leaves, as well as intertidal rocks. They can be easily recognized by their elongated, snout-like gnathosoma pedipalps bearing two (one in Monotrichobdella) long terminal setae.

== Genera ==
- Bdella Latreille, 1795
- Biscirus Thor, 1913
- Cyta von Heyden, 1826
- Hexabdella van Der Schyff, Theron & Ueckermann, 2004
- Monotrichobdella Baker & Balock, 1944
- Neomolgus Oudemans, 1937
- Odontoscirus Thor, 1913
- Polytrichus van Der Schyff, Theron & Ueckermann, 2003
- Spinibdella Thor, 1930
- Tetrabdella Hernandes & Feres, 2006
- Trachymolgus Berlese, 1923

== Gallery ==
A mite (Bdellidae) sucks on a dead midge
