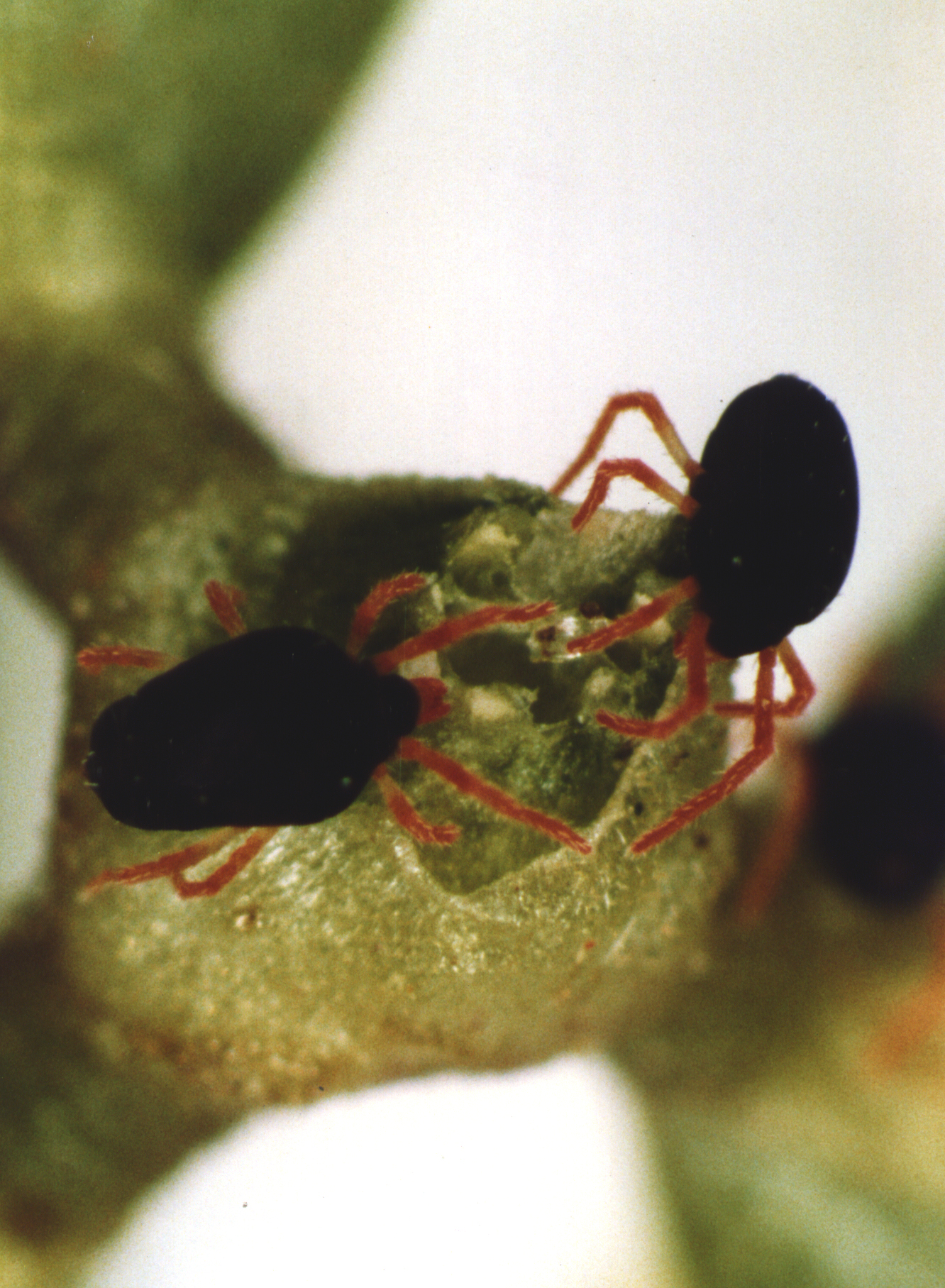

Scientific classification
- Kingdom: Animalia
- Phylum: Arthropoda
- Subphylum: Chelicerata
- Class: Arachnida
- Order: Trombidiformes
- Family: Penthaleidae
- Genus: Halotydeus
- Species: H. destructor

Binomial name
- Halotydeus destructor (Tucker, 1925)

= Halotydeus destructor =

Genus of mites

Halotydeus destructor is a species of earth mites in the family of Penthaleidae, first described by Tucker in 1925 as Penthaleus destructor.

== Pest status ==
This species is a major winter pest of a variety of crops and pastures in southern Australia. As a major pest, it has been the subject of much study: some studies looking at its response to pesticides, others at biological controls, some at both, and others at its spread and potential spread.
