= Balaustium graminum =

Scientific classification
- Kingdom: Animalia
- Phylum: Arthropoda
- Subphylum: Chelicerata
- Class: Arachnida
- Order: Trombidiformes
- Family: Erythraeidae
- Genus: Balaustium
- Species: B. graminum

Binomial name
- Balaustium graminum Meyer & Ryke, 1959

Species of mite

Balaustium graminum is a species of mite belonging to the family Erythraeidae. This mite is very closely related to and similar to Balaustium medicagoense but has two (rather than one) pairs of eyes and is less densely hairy.

The adult is associated with various grasses in the vicinity of Grabouw, South Africa.
