= Abrolophus marinensis =

Scientific classification
- Domain: Eukaryota
- Kingdom: Animalia
- Phylum: Arthropoda
- Subphylum: Chelicerata
- Class: Arachnida
- Order: Trombidiformes
- Family: Erythraeidae
- Genus: Abrolophus
- Species: A. marinensis

Binomial name
- Abrolophus marinensis Haitlinger, 2007

Species of mite

Abrolophus marinensis is a species of mite belonging to the family Erythraeidae. It is named after the Marine de Farimore, Corsica, where the species was first collected. A. marinensis differs from its cogenerate species in its palptarsus having 2 setae with a tufty tip. It particularly differs from Abrolophus longicollis in its shorter length measurements.

== Description ==
The dorsum of the larva carries 35 nude setae, and counts with one eye on each side. The dorsal scutum is longer than wide, including 2 pairs of nude scutalae. It also possesses two pairs of sensillary setae. Its idiosoma carries a ventral setal pair, and 2 pairs between its coxae I and II, as well as 14 setae between coxae II and III. All of its ventral setae are found nude.

The gnathosoma has nude hypostomalae, and galealae. Its palpfemur has two setae, the palpgenu 3, palptibia 2 setae and 1 cone-like seta that acts as an accessory claw. All of these are nude. Its tibial claw does not have a divided tip. The palptarsus exhibits 7 setae.
