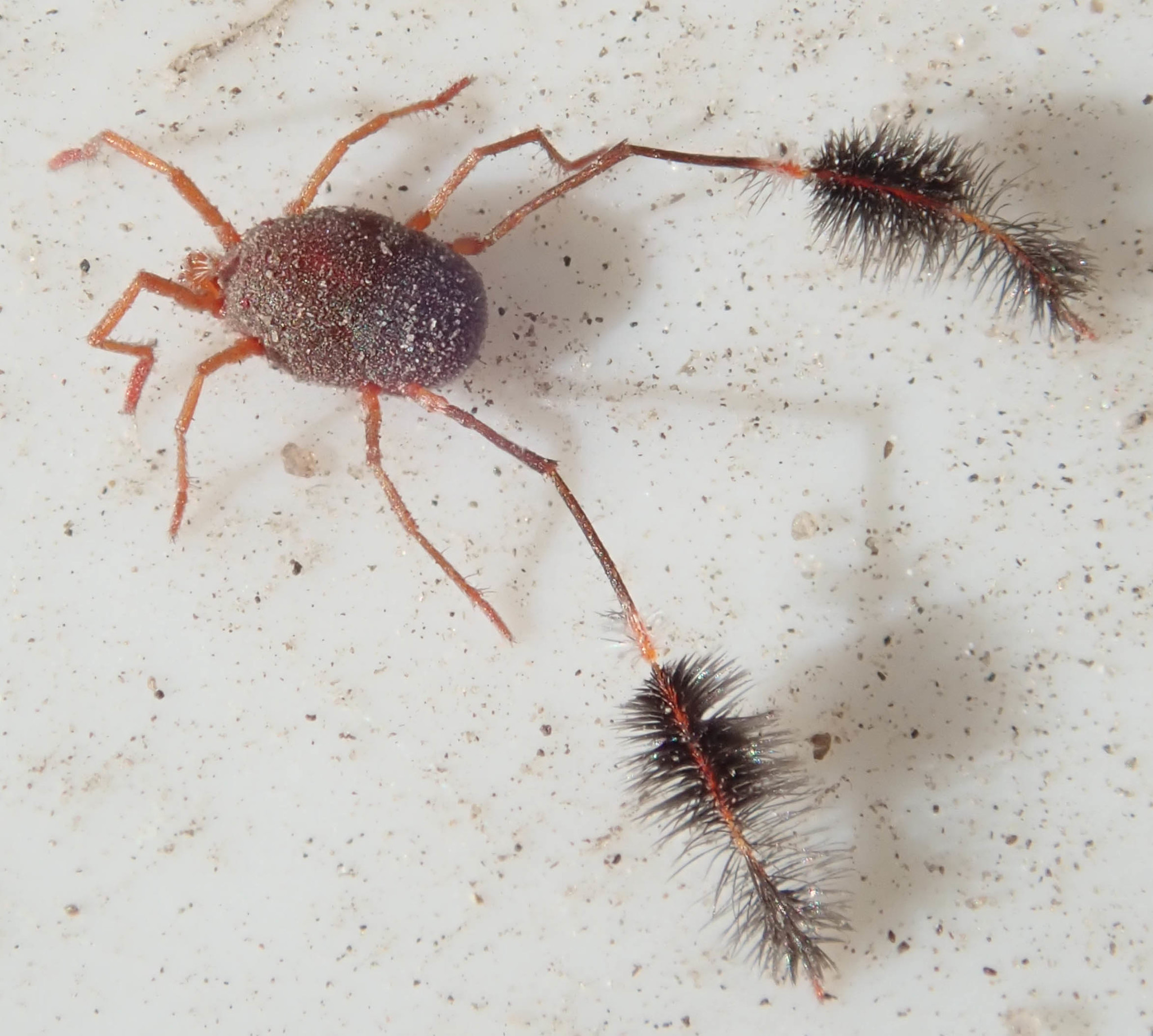

Scientific classification
- Kingdom: Animalia
- Phylum: Arthropoda
- Subphylum: Chelicerata
- Class: Arachnida
- Order: Trombidiformes
- Family: Erythraeidae
- Genus: Eatoniana
- Species: E. namaquensis

Binomial name
- Eatoniana namaquensis Lawrence, 1937

= Namaqua plumefoot mite =

Species of mite

The Namaqua plumefoot mite (Eatoniana namaquensis) is a species of mite of the subfamily Erythraeinae in the family Erythraeidae.

== Range ==
The species is native to South Africa and was described from Kamieskroon in Namaqualand.
