= Balaustium bipilum =

Scientific classification
- Kingdom: Animalia
- Phylum: Arthropoda
- Subphylum: Chelicerata
- Class: Arachnida
- Order: Trombidiformes
- Family: Erythraeidae
- Genus: Balaustium
- Species: B. bipilum

Binomial name
- Balaustium bipilum Meyer & Ryke, 1959

Species of mite

Balaustium bipilum is a species of mite belonging to the family Erythraeidae. This long-oval shaped, sparsely hairy orange mite is less than 1 mm in length with one pair of eyes set well back on the body. It can be distinguished from similar species by the crista (a sclerotized sensory organ at the highest point of the abdomen) projecting forward beyond the margin of the body and the clear suture dividing the upper abdomen. This species is endemic to South Africa.
