= Erythraeus moeritzensis =

Scientific classification
- Kingdom: Animalia
- Phylum: Arthropoda
- Subphylum: Chelicerata
- Class: Arachnida
- Order: Trombidiformes
- Family: Erythraeidae
- Genus: Erythraeus
- Species: E. moeritzensis

Binomial name
- Erythraeus moeritzensis Haitlinger, 2007

Species of mite

Erythraeus moeritzensis is a species of mite belonging to the family Erythraeidae. It belongs to the group of species that has a basifemoral, setal formula 3-3-3.
