= Erythraeus munsteri =

Scientific classification
- Kingdom: Animalia
- Phylum: Arthropoda
- Subphylum: Chelicerata
- Class: Arachnida
- Order: Trombidiformes
- Family: Erythraeidae
- Genus: Erythraeus
- Species: E. munsteri

Binomial name
- Erythraeus munsteri Meyer & Ryke, 1959

Species of mite

Erythraeus munsteri is a species of mite belonging to the family Erythraeidae. This is a large, oval red mite with a body length of up to 1.5 mm. It has two pairs of eyes and long, slender legs (the first and fourth pairs are almost 2.5 mm in length). This mite can easily be distinguished from closely related species by the extraordinarily long, blackish setae which cover the body and legs.

This species is only found in South Africa.
