= Charletonia austisensis =

Scientific classification
- Kingdom: Animalia
- Phylum: Arthropoda
- Subphylum: Chelicerata
- Class: Arachnida
- Order: Trombidiformes
- Family: Erythraeidae
- Genus: Charletonia
- Species: C. austisensis

Binomial name
- Charletonia austisensis Haitlinger, 2007

Species of mite

Charletonia austisensis is a species of mite belonging to the family Erythraeidae. C. austisensis belongs to the species group with two setae between coxae II and III. It differs from its cogenerate species by various length measurements. The species was first found in Austis, Sardinia, after which it is named.

== Description ==
=== Larva ===
The species' dorsum possesses 34 barbed setae, and an eye on each side. Its dorsal scutum is punctate, longer than it is wide, with three pairs of scutalae. It also shows 2 pairs of sensillae, both of which are nude. Its idiosoma counts with a pair of short setae ventrally. Between its coxae II and III it exhibits two setae and 14 setae posterior to coxae III, all barbed. Its gnathosoma shows nude hypostomalae and galealae. The palpfemur has barbed seta, as does the palpgenu. The palptibia, in turn has 3 setae (two barbed, one nude), and the palptarsus possesses 6 nude setae.
