= Charletonia samosensis =

Scientific classification
- Kingdom: Animalia
- Phylum: Arthropoda
- Subphylum: Chelicerata
- Class: Arachnida
- Order: Trombidiformes
- Family: Erythraeidae
- Genus: Charletonia
- Species: C. samosensis

Binomial name
- Charletonia samosensis Haitlinger, 2006

Species of mite

Charletonia samosensis is a species of mite belonging to the family Erythraeidae, first described from Greece.
