= Erythraeus passidonicus =

Scientific classification
- Kingdom: Animalia
- Phylum: Arthropoda
- Subphylum: Chelicerata
- Class: Arachnida
- Order: Trombidiformes
- Family: Erythraeidae
- Genus: Erythraeus
- Species: E. passidonicus

Binomial name
- Erythraeus passidonicus Haitlinger, 2006

Species of mite

Erythraeus passidonicus is a species of mite belonging to the family Erythraeidae, first described from Greece.
