= Abrolophus mirabelae =

Scientific classification
- Kingdom: Animalia
- Phylum: Arthropoda
- Subphylum: Chelicerata
- Class: Arachnida
- Order: Trombidiformes
- Family: Erythraeidae
- Genus: Abrolophus
- Species: A. mirabelae

Binomial name
- Abrolophus mirabelae Haitlinger, 2007

Species of mite

Abrolophus mirabelae is a species of mite belonging to the family Erythraeidae. It belongs to the group of species that have comb-like setae.
