= Erythraeus berninensis =

Scientific classification
- Kingdom: Animalia
- Phylum: Arthropoda
- Subphylum: Chelicerata
- Class: Arachnida
- Order: Trombidiformes
- Family: Erythraeidae
- Genus: Erythraeus
- Species: E. berninensis

Binomial name
- Erythraeus berninensis Haitlinger, 2007

Species of mite

Erythraeus berninensis is a species of mite belonging to the family Erythraeidae.
