= Balaustium cristatum =

Scientific classification
- Kingdom: Animalia
- Phylum: Arthropoda
- Subphylum: Chelicerata
- Class: Arachnida
- Order: Trombidiformes
- Family: Erythraeidae
- Genus: Balaustium
- Species: B. cristatum

Binomial name
- Balaustium cristatum Meyer & Ryke, 1959

Species of mite

Balaustium cristatum is a species of mite belonging to the family Erythraeidae. This oval mite is only known from immature specimens: the eight-legged nymph is around 0.75 mm in length and moderately hairy with two pairs of eyes and all legs shorter than the body. The six-legged larva is only around 0.5 mm in length and sparsely hairy with one pair of eyes and the third pair of legs longer than the body.

It is associated with various plants in the vicinity of Malelane, South Africa.
