= Charletonia cuglierensis =

Scientific classification
- Kingdom: Animalia
- Phylum: Arthropoda
- Subphylum: Chelicerata
- Class: Arachnida
- Order: Trombidiformes
- Family: Erythraeidae
- Genus: Charletonia
- Species: C. cuglierensis

Binomial name
- Charletonia cuglierensis Haitlinger, 2007

Species of mite

Charletonia cuglierensis is a species of mite belonging to the family Erythraeidae, so named after its type locality. C. cuglierensis belongs to the group of species which possess two setae between coxae II and III. It differs from its cogenerate species by length measurements. It was first found in Sardinia, 6 kilometres (3.7 mi) south of Cuglieri.

== Description ==
=== Larva ===
This animal carries 33 barbed setae on its dorsum, and one eye on each side. Its dorsal scutum is longer than it is wide, with three pairs of slightly barbed scutalae, as well as two pairs of nude scutalae. Its idiosoma exhibits a pair of setae ventrally, which are slightly barbed. Between its coxae II and III, there are two setae and 18 barbed setae posterior to its coxae III. All of its setae on coxae I through III are slightly barbed. The gnathosoma has hypostomalae. The palpfemur has seta, as does the palpgenu. The palptibia shows three setae (two barbed and one nude), while the palptarsus has 6 nude setae.
