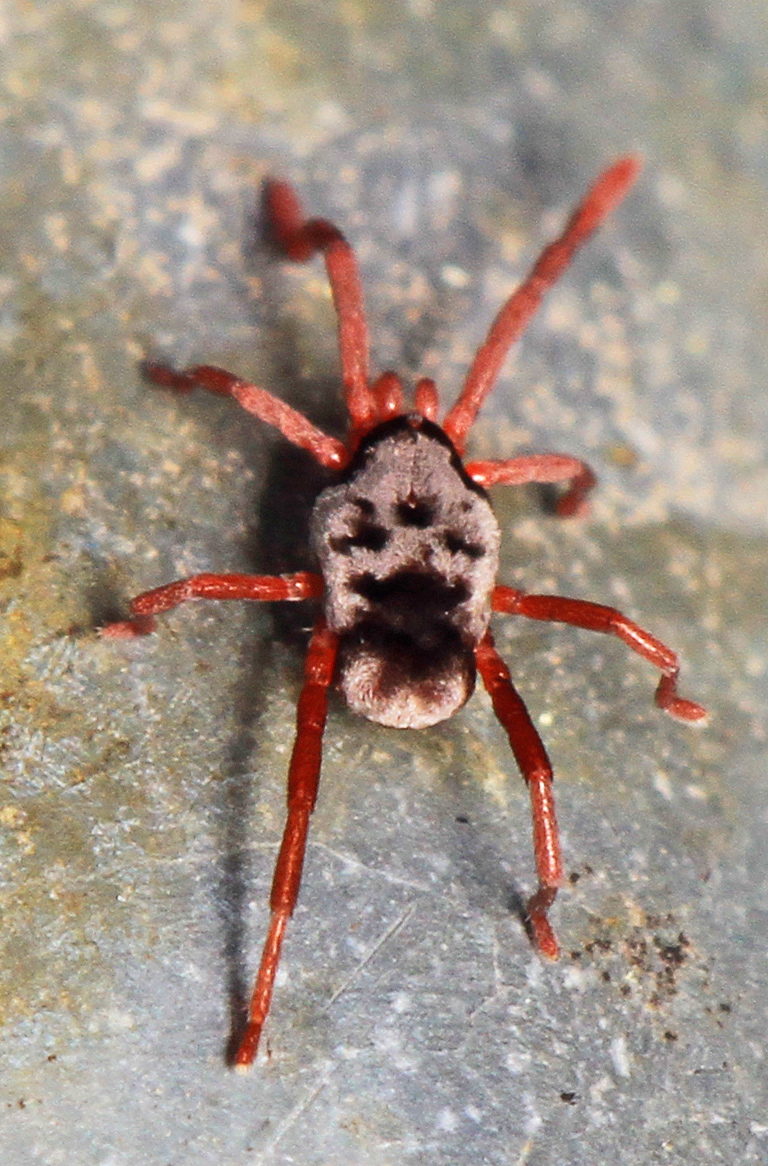
- Long-legged Velvet Mite (Leptus)

Scientific classification
- Kingdom: Animalia
- Phylum: Arthropoda
- Subphylum: Chelicerata
- Class: Arachnida
- Order: Trombidiformes
- Family: Erythraeidae
- Genus: Leptus; Latreille, 1796

Species
- See § Selected species

Synonyms
- Achorolophus Berlese, 1891; Amaroptus Haitlinger, 2000; Badisma Gistl, 1848; Leptomus Rafinesque, 1815

= Leptus =

Leptus Temporal range: Cretaceous–present

Genus of mites

Leptus is a genus of large mites belonging to the family Erythraeidae; they resemble members of the related genus Balaustium, but can be distinguished by the eyes, which in Leptus species are set much further forward on the body than in Balaustium species.

The genus was first described in 1796 by Pierre André Latreille.

== Selected species ==
Interim Register of Marine and NonMarine Genera lists 202 species.

- Leptus ariel Southcott, 1989
- Leptus berlesei
- Leptus clavatus
- Leptus intermedius Meyer & Ryke, 1959
- Leptus monteithi Southcott, 1993
- Leptus pozzoicus Ryszard, 2007
- Leptus trimaculatus (Rossi, 1794)
- Leptus vertiformis
