= Balaustium vignae =

Scientific classification
- Kingdom: Animalia
- Phylum: Arthropoda
- Subphylum: Chelicerata
- Class: Arachnida
- Order: Trombidiformes
- Family: Erythraeidae
- Genus: Balaustium
- Species: B. vignae

Binomial name
- Balaustium vignae Meyer & Ryke, 1959

Species of mite

Balaustium vignae is a species of mite belonging to the family Erythraeidae. This moderately hairy orange mite is around 1 mm in length with one pair of eyes set well back on the body. It can be distinguished from similar species by the first pair of legs being longer than the body and the lack of a suture dividing the abdomen.

The adult is associated with Vicia faba whereas the nymphs are found on various grasses. It is found in the vicinity of Potchefstroom, South Africa.
