= Erythraeus kastaniensis =

Scientific classification
- Kingdom: Animalia
- Phylum: Arthropoda
- Subphylum: Chelicerata
- Class: Arachnida
- Order: Trombidiformes
- Family: Erythraeidae
- Genus: Erythraeus
- Species: E. kastaniensis

Binomial name
- Erythraeus kastaniensis Haitlinger, 2006

Species of mite

Erythraeus kastaniensis is a species of mite belonging to the family Erythraeidae, first described from Greece.
