= Leptus pozzoicus =

Scientific classification
- Kingdom: Animalia
- Phylum: Arthropoda
- Subphylum: Chelicerata
- Class: Arachnida
- Order: Trombidiformes
- Family: Erythraeidae
- Genus: Leptus
- Species: L. pozzoicus

Binomial name
- Leptus pozzoicus Ryszard, 2007

Species of mite

Leptus pozzoicus is a species of mite. It is named after Porto Pozzo, near Santa Teresa Gallura, the place where the species was first collected. L. pozzoicus belongs to the group of species with two palpgenualae, and that have over four setae between coxalae II and III. It differs from its cogenerate species by various length measurements.

== Description ==
=== Larva ===
This species' dorsum counts with about 250 setulose setae, and one eye on each side. Its dorsal scutum has a concave anterior border. Its posterior border is pointed. Its scutalae possess distinct setules. Anterior sensillae and posterior sensillae are both nude. It presents a short line behind its sensillae's sockets, as well as two lines below and laterally to the posterior sensillae's sockets. Its idiosoma has eight setae between coxae I and II ventrally, 36 setae between coxae II and III and behind coxae III there are about 46 setulose setae. Its coxala Ib is its longest.

The gnathosoma is considered long. Its hypostomalae are nude; the palpfemur shows one setulose seta, the palpgenu two, the palptibia three, and the palptarsus 7, all of them nude.
