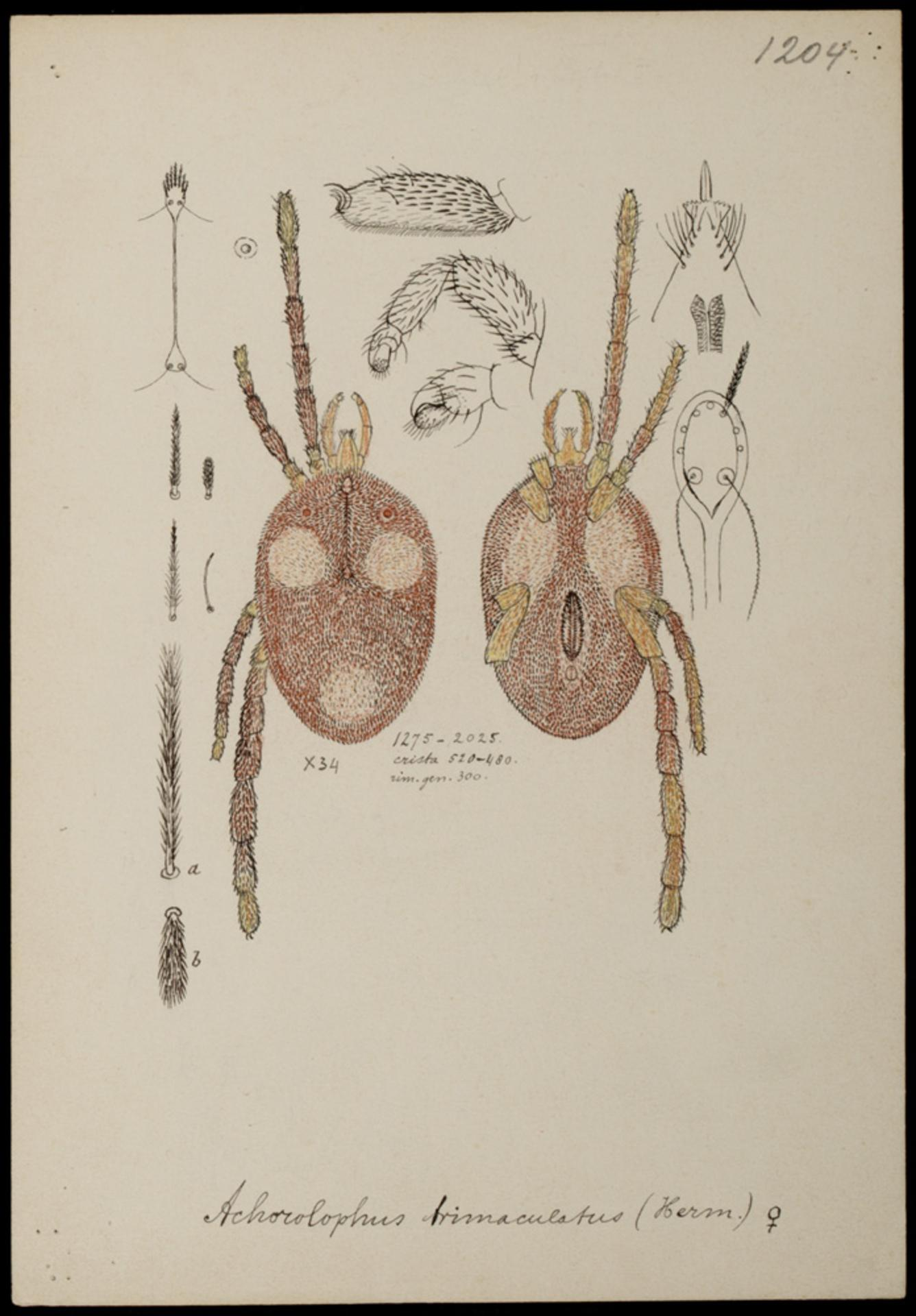

Scientific classification
- Kingdom: Animalia
- Phylum: Arthropoda
- Subphylum: Chelicerata
- Class: Arachnida
- Order: Trombidiformes
- Family: Erythraeidae
- Genus: Leptus
- Species: L. trimaculatus

Binomial name
- Leptus trimaculatus (Rossi, 1794)

Synonyms
- Rhyncholophus trimaculata (Hermann); Trombidium trimaculatum Rossi, 1794

= Leptus trimaculatus =

Species of mite

Leptus trimaculatus is a species of mite in the Erythraeidae family, first described in 1794 by Pietro Rossi as Trombidium trimaculatus.
