= Leptus intermedius =

Scientific classification
- Kingdom: Animalia
- Phylum: Arthropoda
- Subphylum: Chelicerata
- Class: Arachnida
- Order: Trombidiformes
- Family: Erythraeidae
- Genus: Leptus
- Species: L. intermedius

Binomial name
- Leptus intermedius Meyer & Ryke, 1959

Species of mite

Leptus intermedius is a species of mite belonging to the family Erythraeidae. This is a large, oval mite with a total length of 1.7 mm. The body is densely hairy and there is one pair of eyes. The fourth pair of legs is longer than the body. This species has been recorded only in the Bathurst area of South Africa.
