= Charletonia =

Scientific classification
- Kingdom: Animalia
- Phylum: Arthropoda
- Subphylum: Chelicerata
- Class: Arachnida
- Order: Trombidiformes
- Family: Erythraeidae
- Genus: Charletonia; Oudemans, 1910

Species
- Charletonia austisensis Haitlinger, 2017; Charletonia cuglierensis Haitlinger, 2017; Charletonia elbasani Haitlinger, 2017; Charletonia kalithensis Haitlinger, 2006; Charletonia samosensis Haitlinger, 2006

Genus of mites

Charletonia is a genus of mites belonging to the family Erythraeidae.
