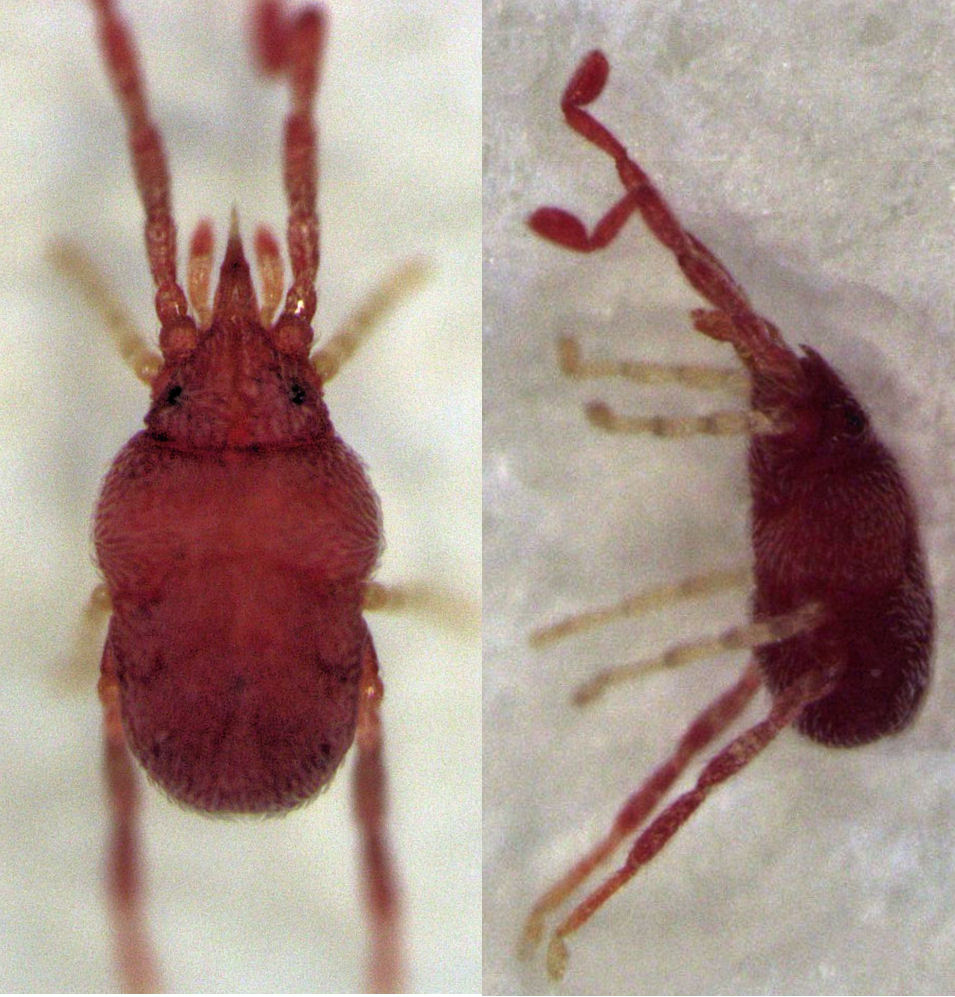

Scientific classification
- Kingdom: Animalia
- Phylum: Arthropoda
- Subphylum: Chelicerata
- Class: Arachnida
- Order: Trombidiformes
- Family: Erythraeidae
- Genus: Abrolophus; Berlese, 1891

= Abrolophus =

Genus of mites

Abrolophus is a genus of mites in the family Erythraeidae, first described in 1891 by Antonio Berlese.

== Species ==
It comprises 120 species, including the following:

- Abrolophus aitapensis (Southcott, 1948)
- Abrolophus benoni (Haitlinger, 2002)
- Abrolophus bohdani (Haitlinger, 2003)
- Abrolophus humberti (Haitlinger, 1996)
- Abrolophus iraninejadi Saboori & Hajiqanbar, 2005
- Abrolophus khanjani (Haitlinger & Saboori, 1996)
- Abrolophus longicollis (Oudemans, 1910)
- Abrolophus marinensis Haitlinger, 2007
- Abrolophus mirabelae Haitlinger, 2007
- Abrolophus pseudolongicollis (Haitlinger, 1987)
- Abrolophus tonsor (Southcott, 1996)
- Abrolophus welbourni Yao, Snider, & Snider, 2000
- Abrolophus unimiri Haitlinger, 2006
