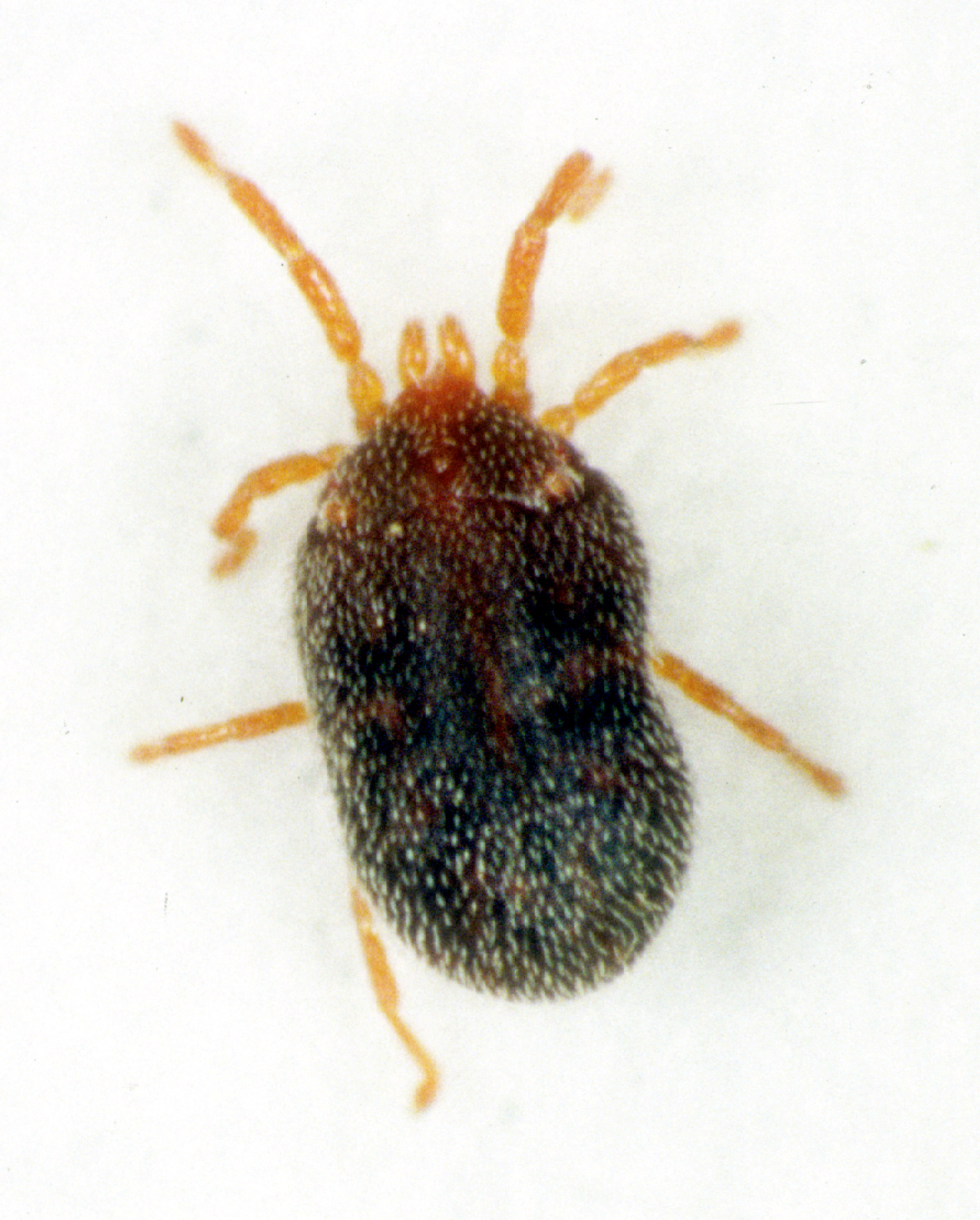

Scientific classification
- Kingdom: Animalia
- Phylum: Arthropoda
- Subphylum: Chelicerata
- Class: Arachnida
- Order: Trombidiformes
- Family: Erythraeidae
- Genus: Balaustium
- Species: B. medicagoense

Binomial name
- Balaustium medicagoense Meyer & Ryke, 1959

= Balaustium medicagoense =

Species of mite

Balaustium medicagoense is a species of mite belonging to the family Erythraeidae. This large, densely hairy mite is up to 1.6 mm in length with one pair of eyes set well back on the body. The first pair of legs is just longer than the body.

This mite is associated with Medicago sativa and various other plants and has been recorded in the vicinity of Caledon and Grabouw, South Africa.
