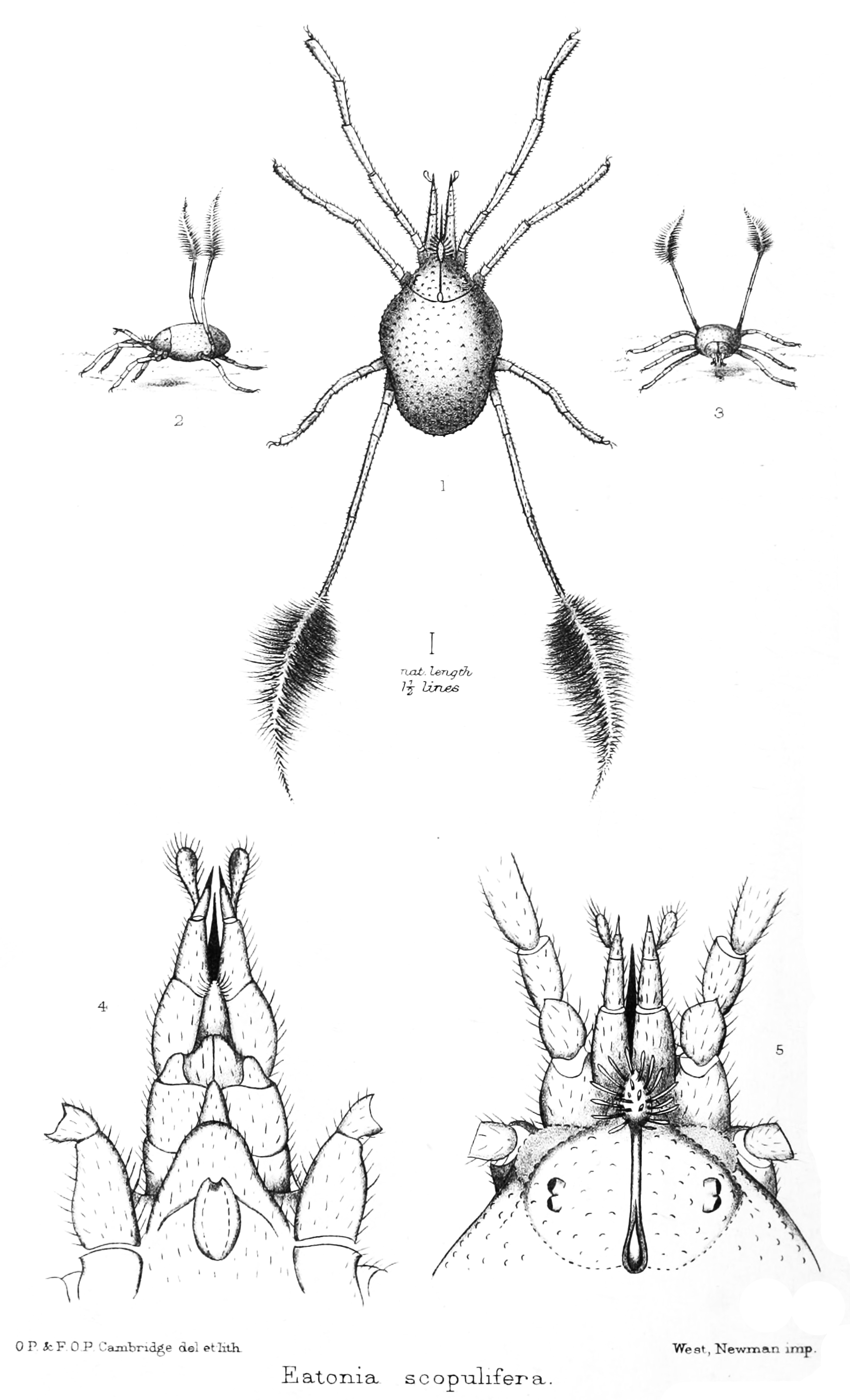
- E. scopulifera

Scientific classification
- Kingdom: Animalia
- Phylum: Arthropoda
- Subphylum: Chelicerata
- Class: Arachnida
- Order: Trombidiformes
- Family: Erythraeidae
- Genus: Erythraeus; Latreille, 1806

Species include
- Erythraeus berninensis; Erythraeus celeripes; Erythraeus collinitus; Erythraeus imperator; Erythraeus kastaniensis; Erythraeus moeritzensis; Erythraeus munsteri; Erythraeus passidonicus

Synonyms
- Eatonia

= Erythraeus =

Erythraeus Temporal range: Palaeogene–present

Genus of mites

Erythraeus is a genus of mites belonging to the family Erythraeidae. These are large red mites with two pairs of eyes and long legs (the first and fourth pairs are often longer than the body).
