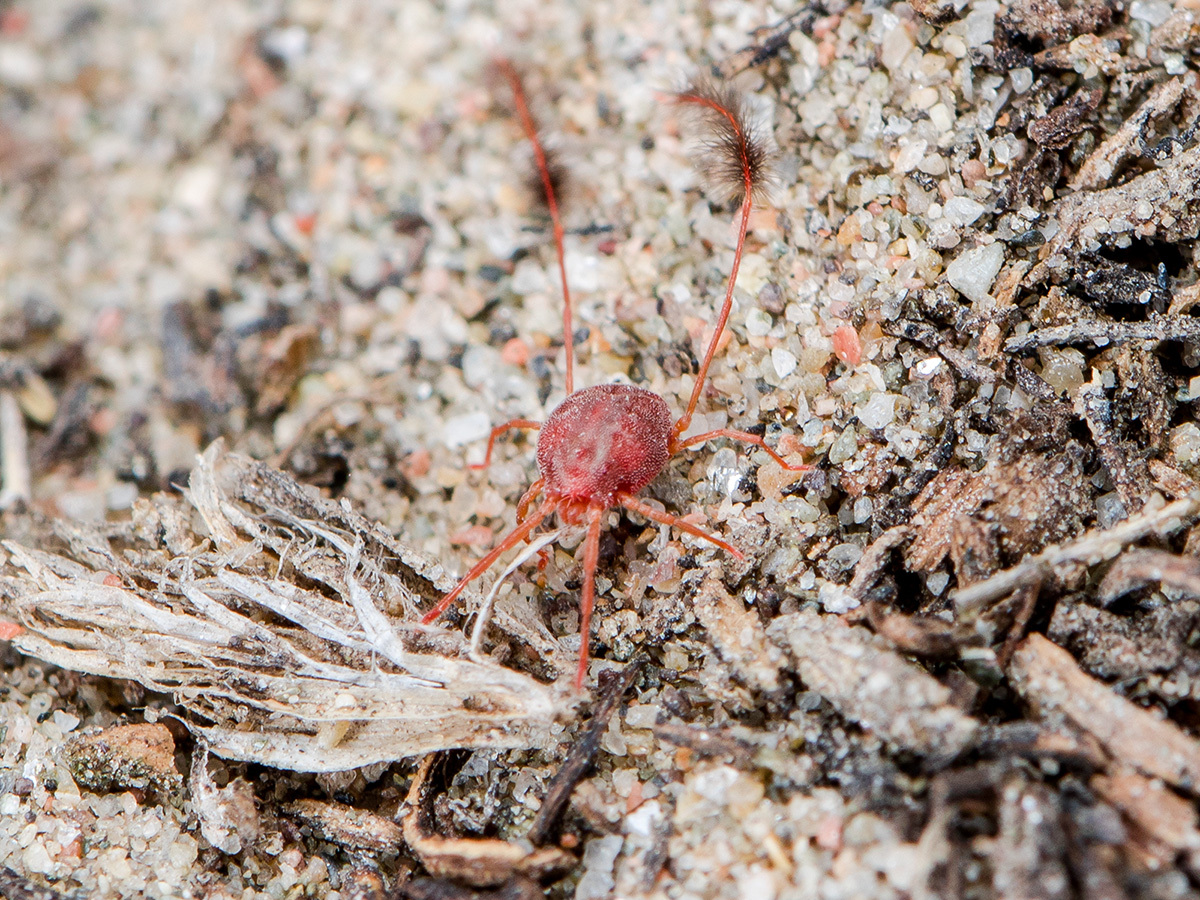
- Eatoniana plumipes

Scientific classification
- Kingdom: Animalia
- Phylum: Arthropoda
- Subphylum: Chelicerata
- Class: Arachnida
- Order: Trombidiformes
- Family: Erythraeidae
- Genus: Eatoniana; Cambridge, 1898

Synonyms
- Abalakeus Southcott, 1994; Lucasiella Banks, 1900; Ptilolophus Berlese, 1916

= Eatoniana =

Genus of mite

Eatoniana is a genus of mites in the family Erythraeidae.

== Species ==
Nine or ten species are currently recognized in the genus:

- E. bambusae (Z.-Q.Zhang, Y.Zhang & Lin, 2000)
- E. chekei (Southcott, 1994)
- E. claviger (Berlese, 1916)
- E. georgei Oudemans, 1941
- E. gonabadensis (Ahmadi, Hajiqanbar & Saboori, 2012)
- E. halleri (Banks, 1900)
- E. lorestanica (Saboori & Lachinani, 2003)
- E. namaquensis (Lawrence, 1937)
- E. plumifer (Birula, 1893)
- E. plumipes (L.Koch, 1856)
