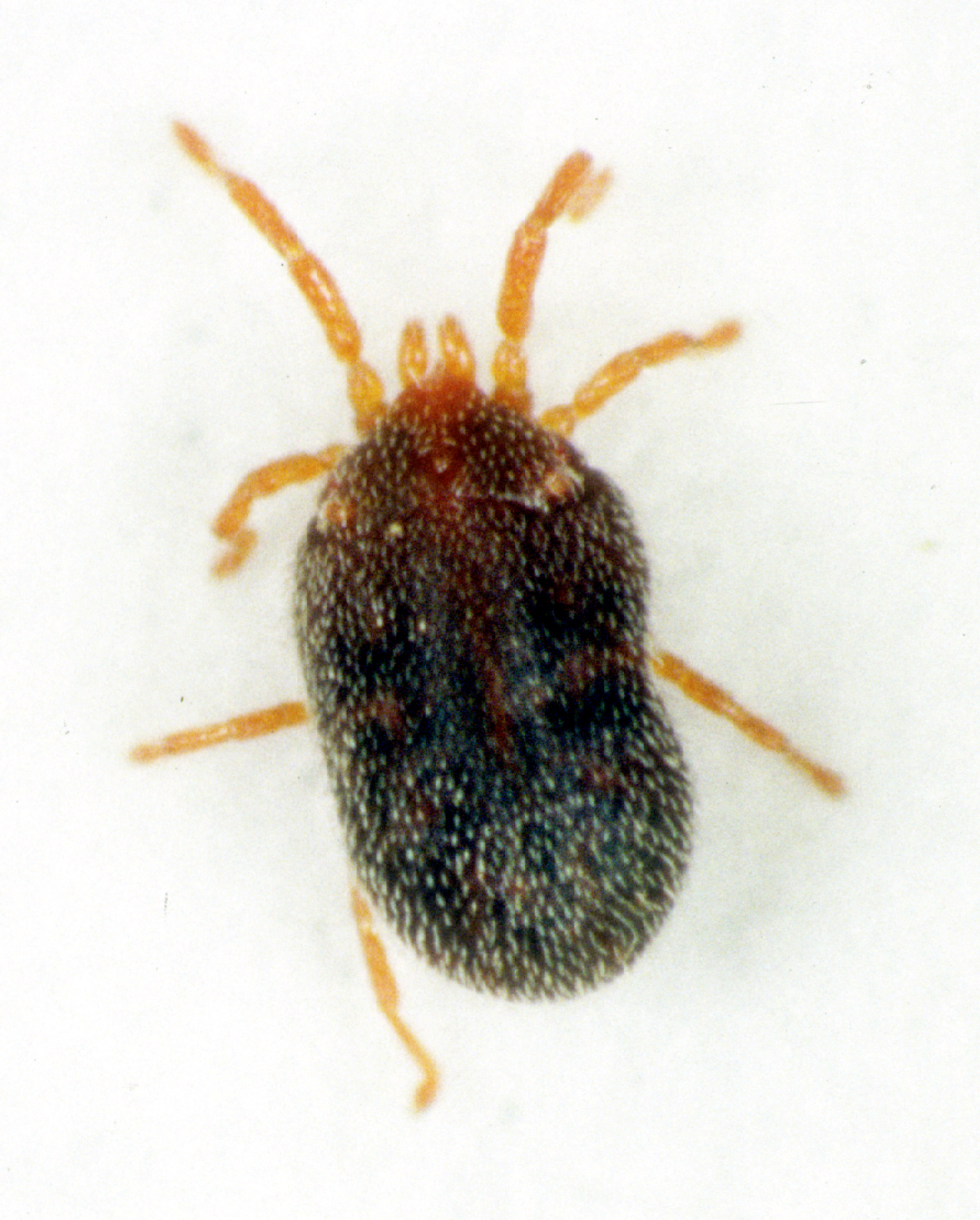
- Balaustium medicagoense

Scientific classification
- Kingdom: Animalia
- Phylum: Arthropoda
- Subphylum: Chelicerata
- Class: Arachnida
- Order: Trombidiformes
- Family: Erythraeidae
- Genus: Balaustium; Heyden, 1826

Species
- See § Species

= Balaustium =

Genus of mites

Balaustium is a genus of mites belonging to the family Erythraeidae. These are large red mites with one or two pairs of eyes set well back on the body.

== Species ==
Species include:

- Balaustium aonidophagus (Ebeling)
- Balaustium angustum
- Balaustium bipilum
- Balaustium cristatum
- Balaustium dowelli (Smiley)
- Balaustium graminum
- Balaustium insularum
- Balaustium kendalli (Welbourn)
- Balaustium lapidarium
- Balaustium madeirense
- Balaustium medicagoense
- Balaustium murorum (Hermann, 1804)
- Balaustium putmani (Smiley)
- Balaustium tardum
- Balaustium vignae
