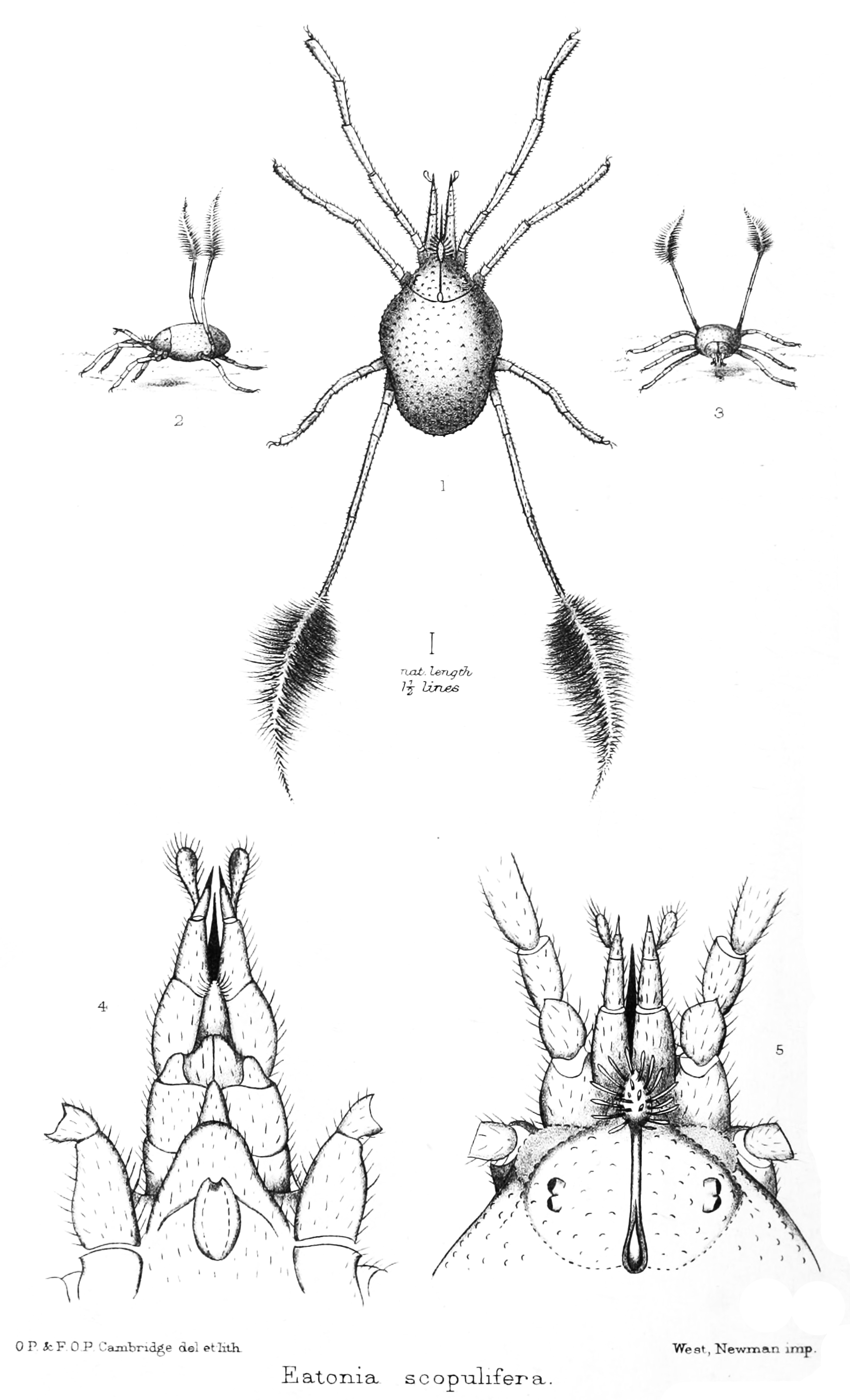
- Erythraeus scopulifera

Scientific classification
- Kingdom: Animalia
- Phylum: Arthropoda
- Subphylum: Chelicerata
- Class: Arachnida
- Order: Trombidiformes
- Infraorder: Anystina
- Superfamily: Erythraeoidea
- Family: Erythraeidae; Oudemans, 1902

Diversity
- c. 60 genera, > 800 species

Synonyms
- Erythreidae

= Erythraeidae =

Erythraeidae Temporal range: Cretaceous–present

Family of mites

Erythraeidae is a family of mites belonging to the Trombidiformes. Mites of this family are often referred to as long-legged velvet mites. Larval forms of these mites are parasitic on various other arthropods, for example harvestmen, but the adults are free-living predators. These oval mites are rather large, usually reddish-coloured and densely hairy. The legs, especially the first and fourth pairs, are long and adapted for running. They have either one or two pairs of eyes and can be distinguished from related families microscopically by the presence of a single claw on the tibia of the palp.

The larvae bite a hole into the cuticula of the host and use a stylostome, which acts like a drinking straw, to drink body fluids dissolved tissues.

The larvae of two described species of Leptus feed on bees: Leptus ariel lives on the European honey bee in Guatemala, and Leptus monteithi is a parasite of a Leioproctus species (Colletidae) in Tasmania.

Larva on harvestman leg

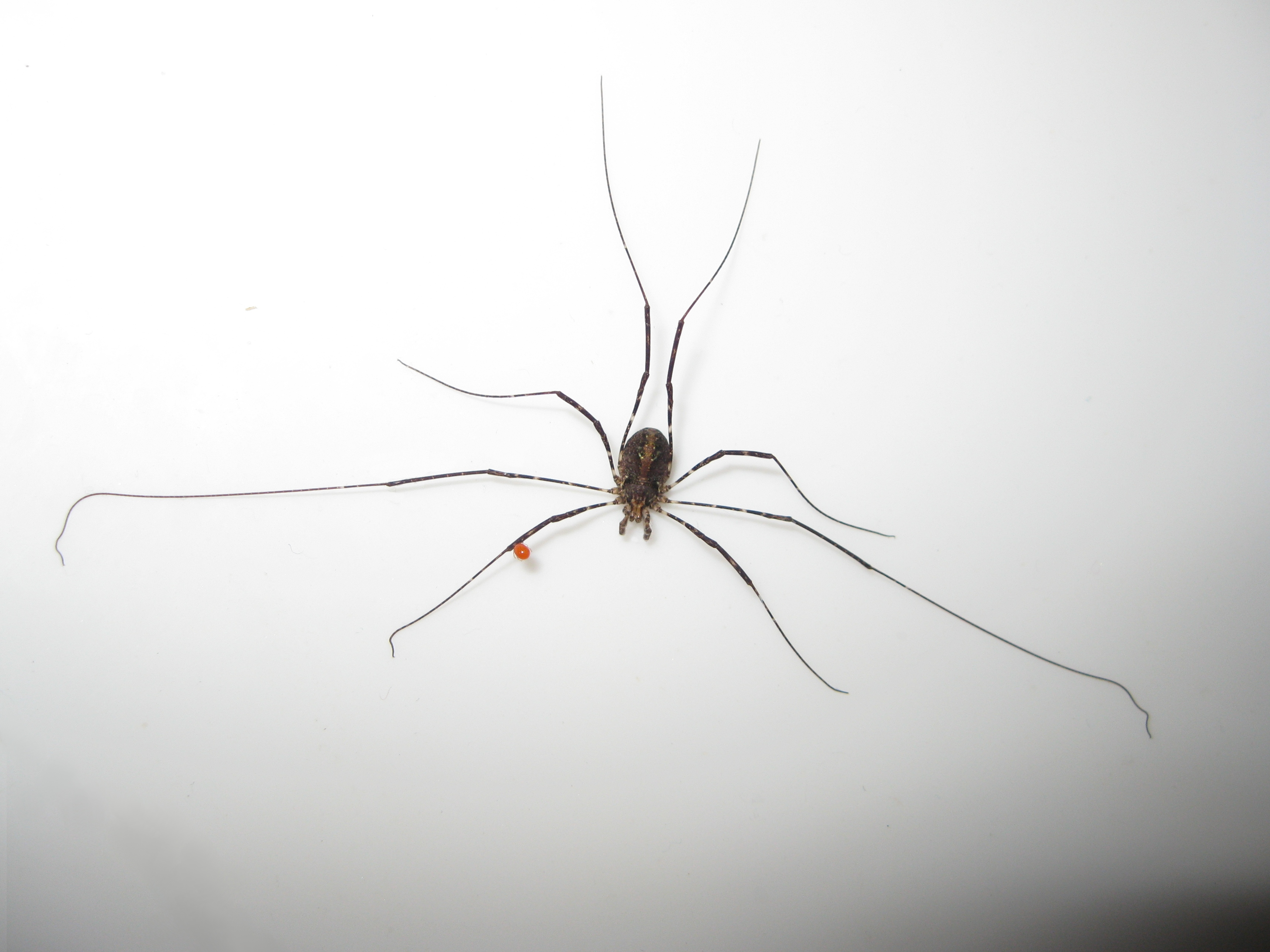
Larva on harvestman leg, New Zealand

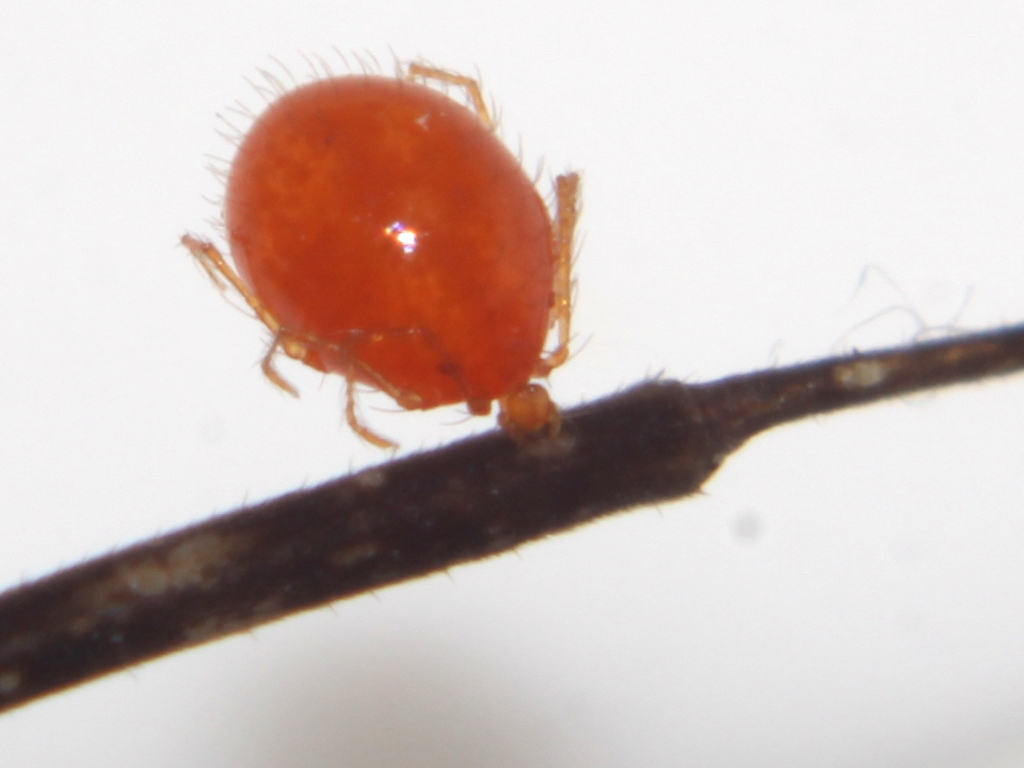
Larva on harvestman leg, New Zealand

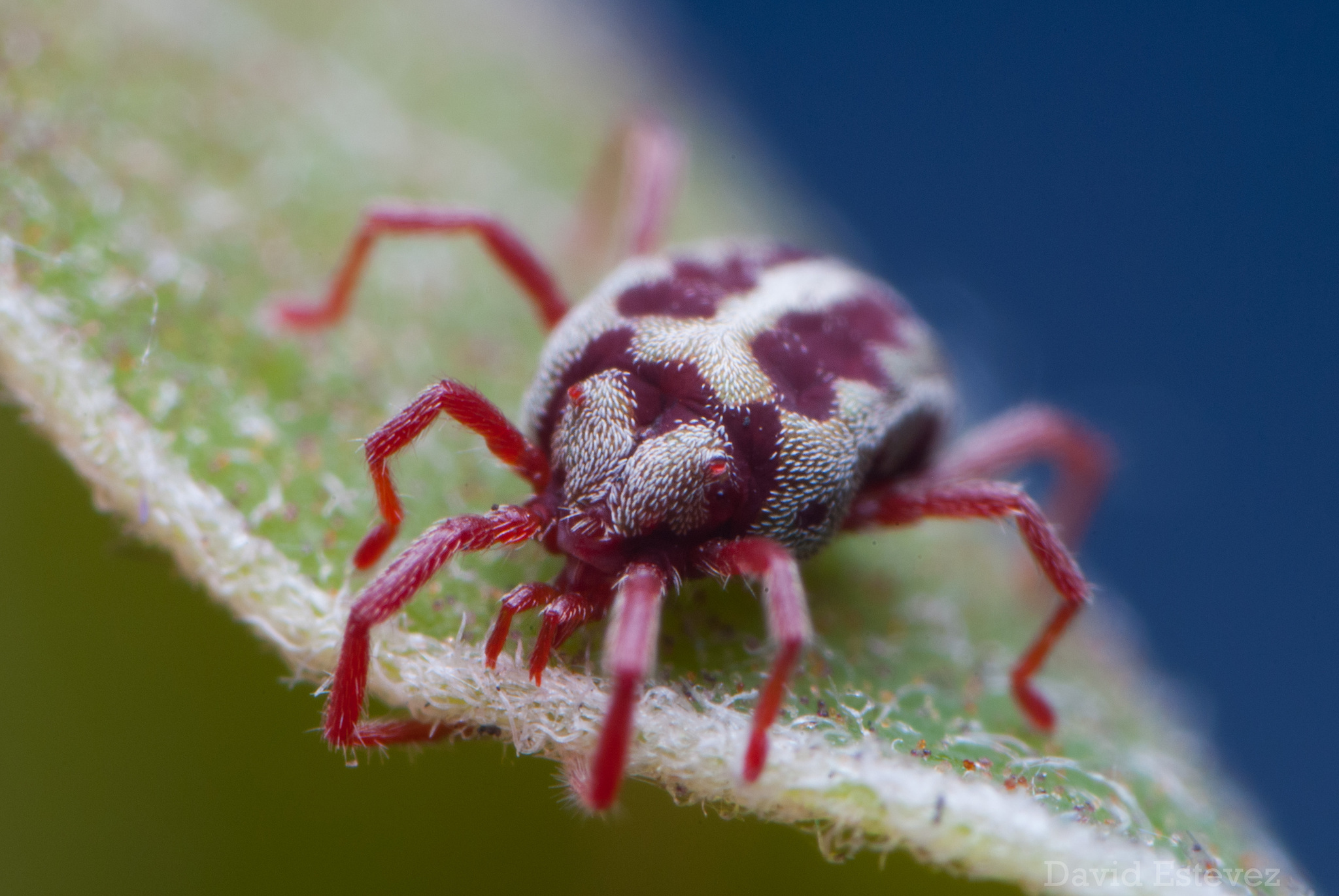
Balaustium leanderi, Colombia

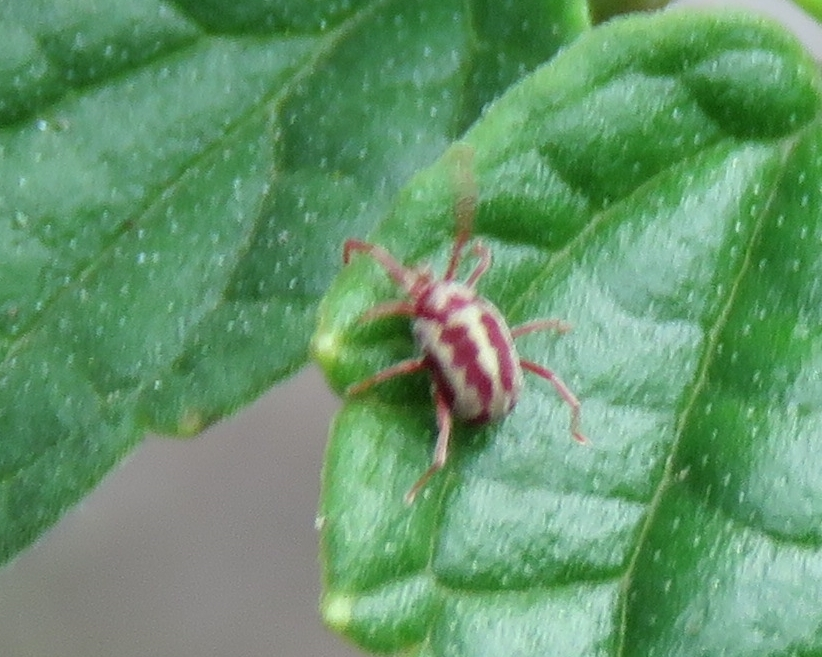
Balaustium leanderi, México

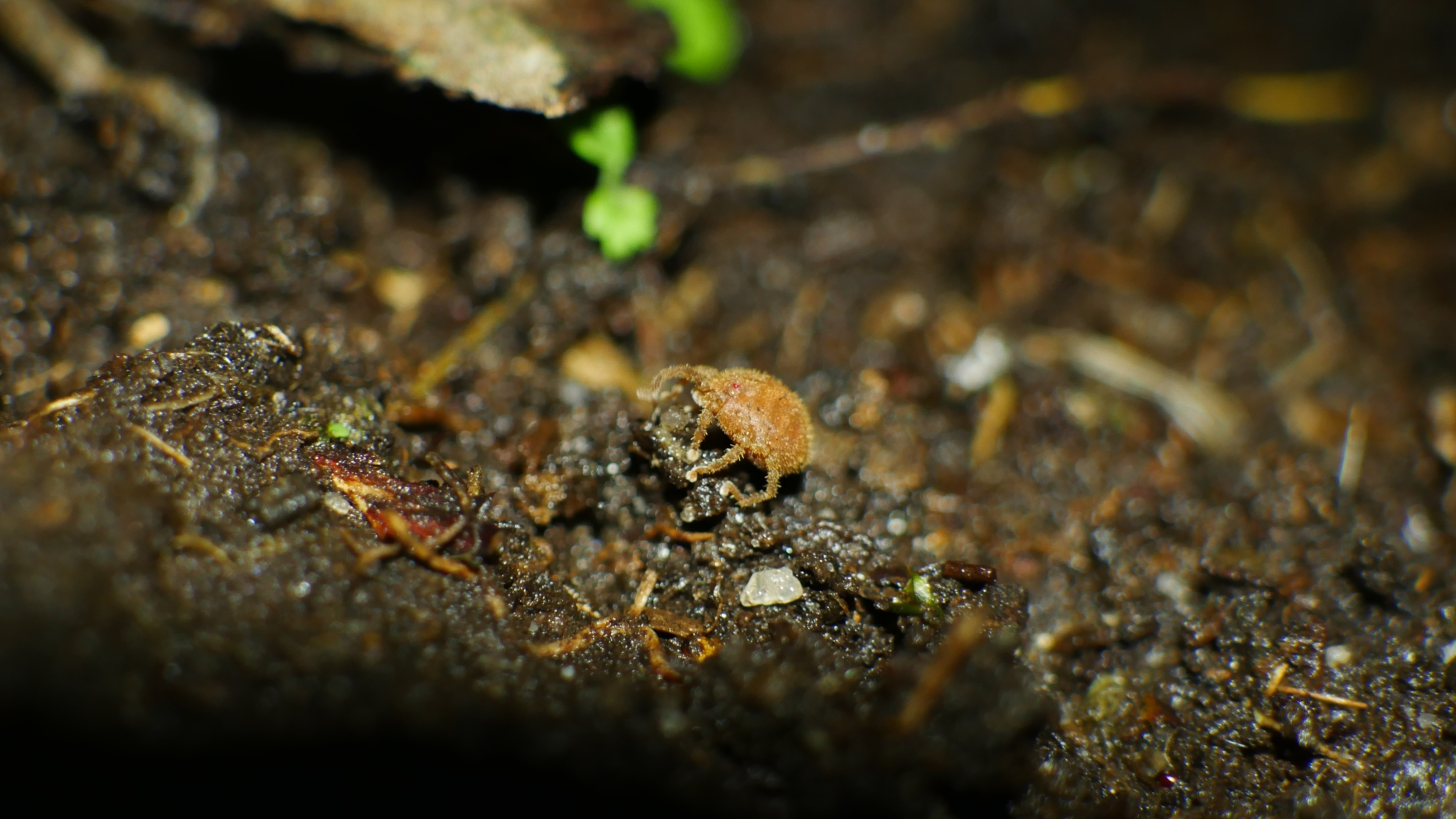
Caeculisoma, Virginia

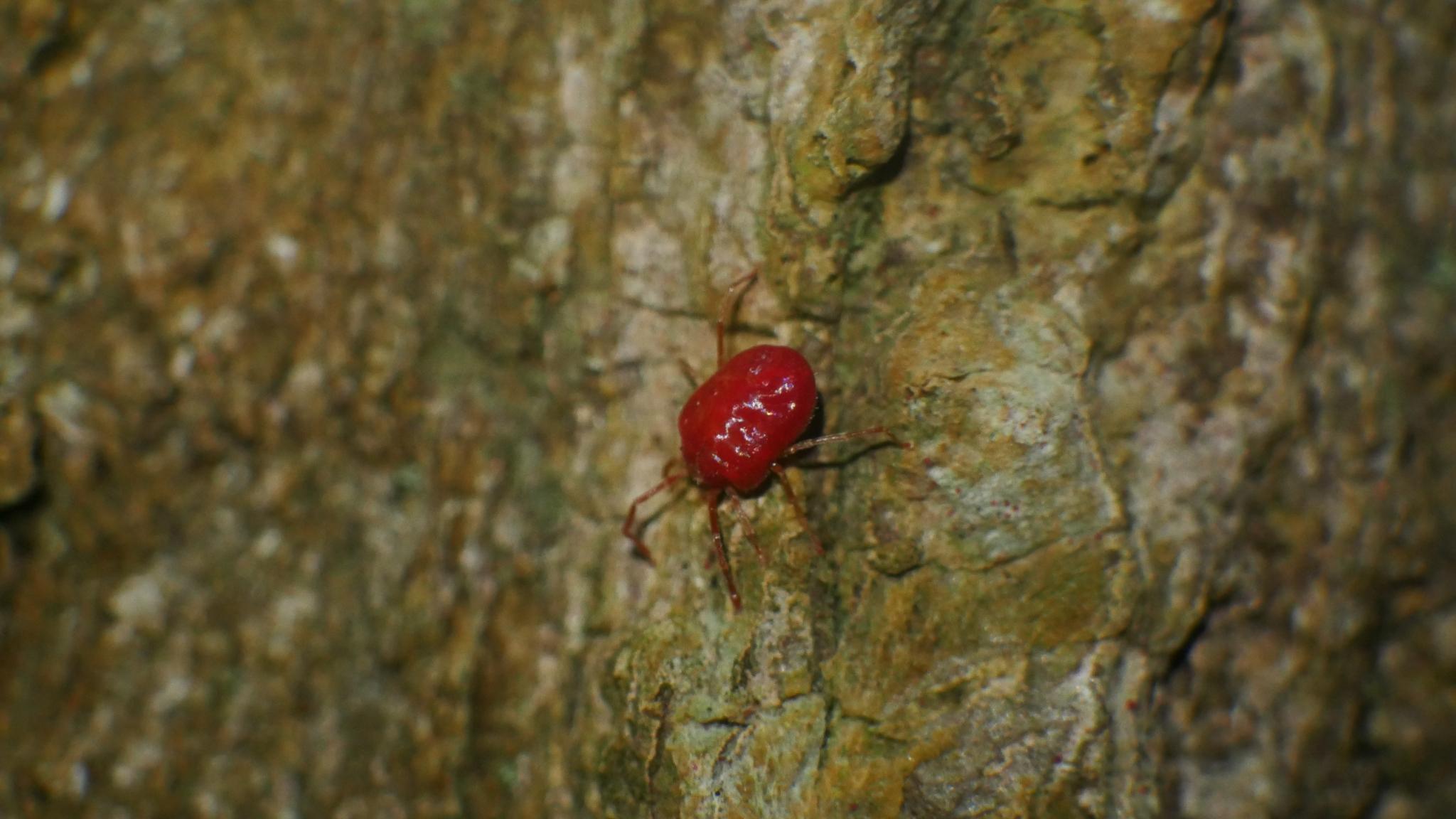
Callidosoma, Virginia

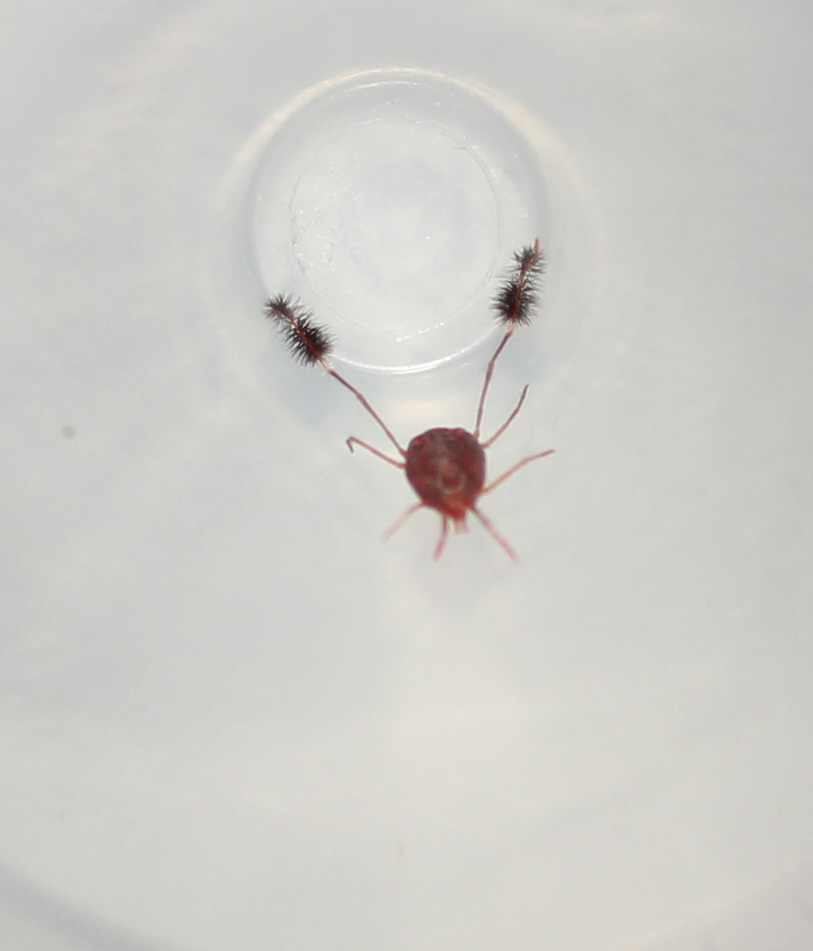
Eatoniana namaquensis, South Africa

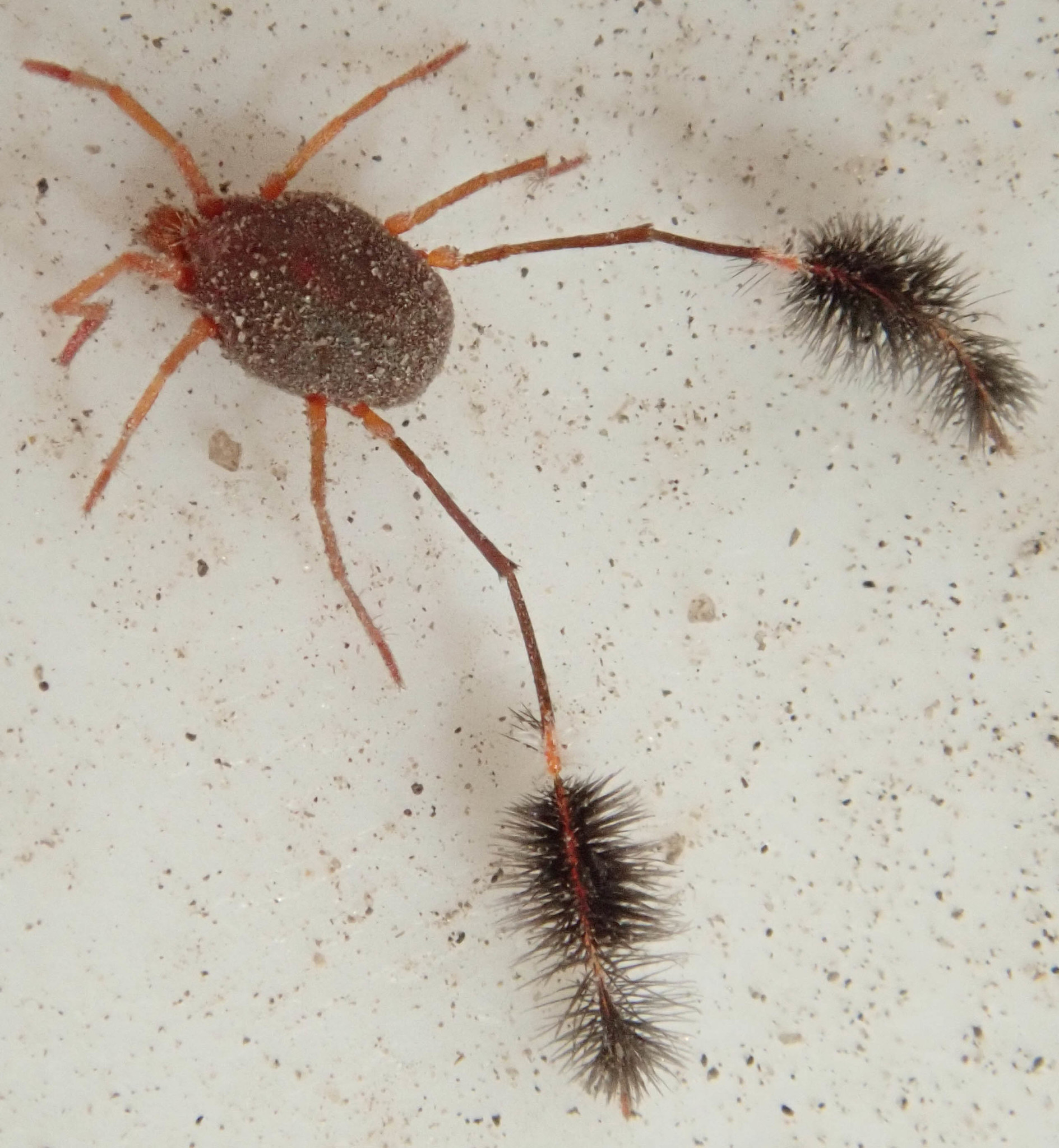
Eatoniana namaquensis, Botswana

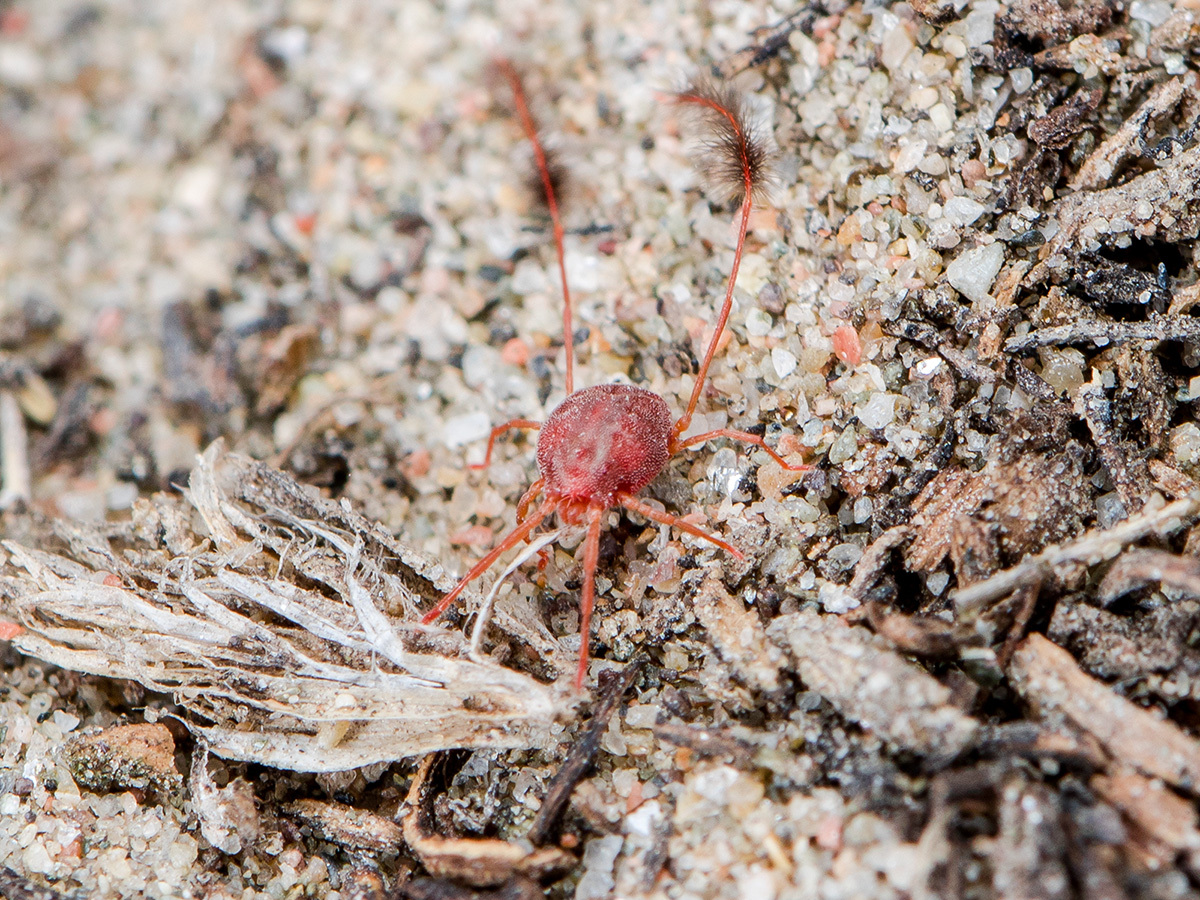
Eatoniana plumipes, Kazakhstan

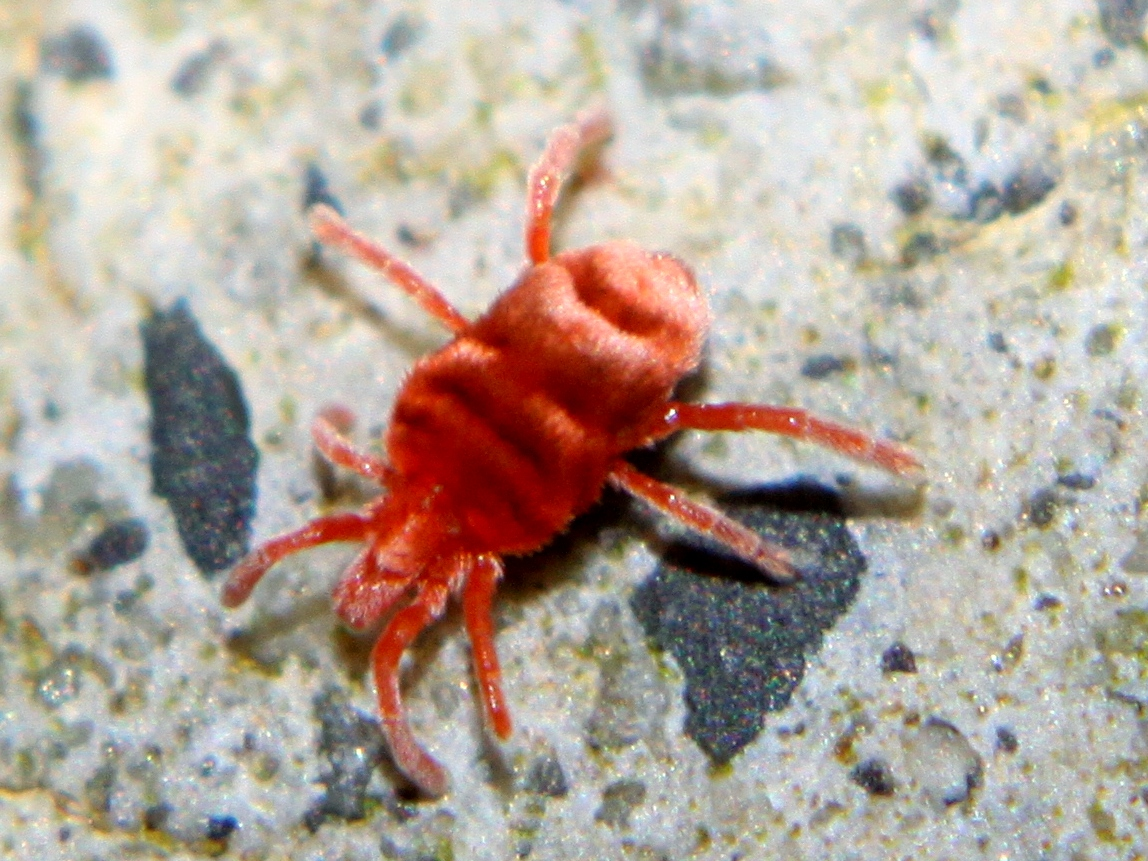
Abrolophus, New Zealand

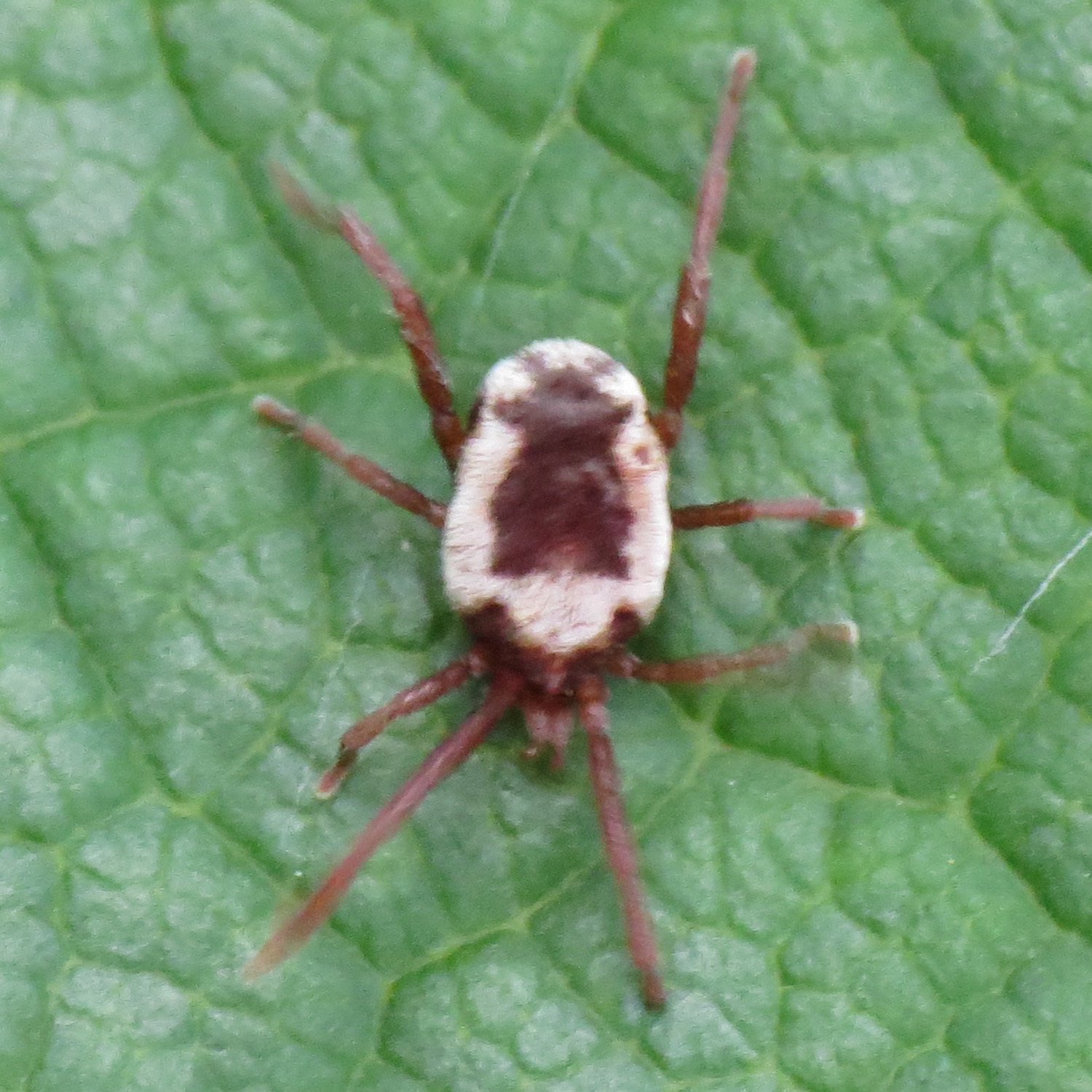
Leptus, Maine

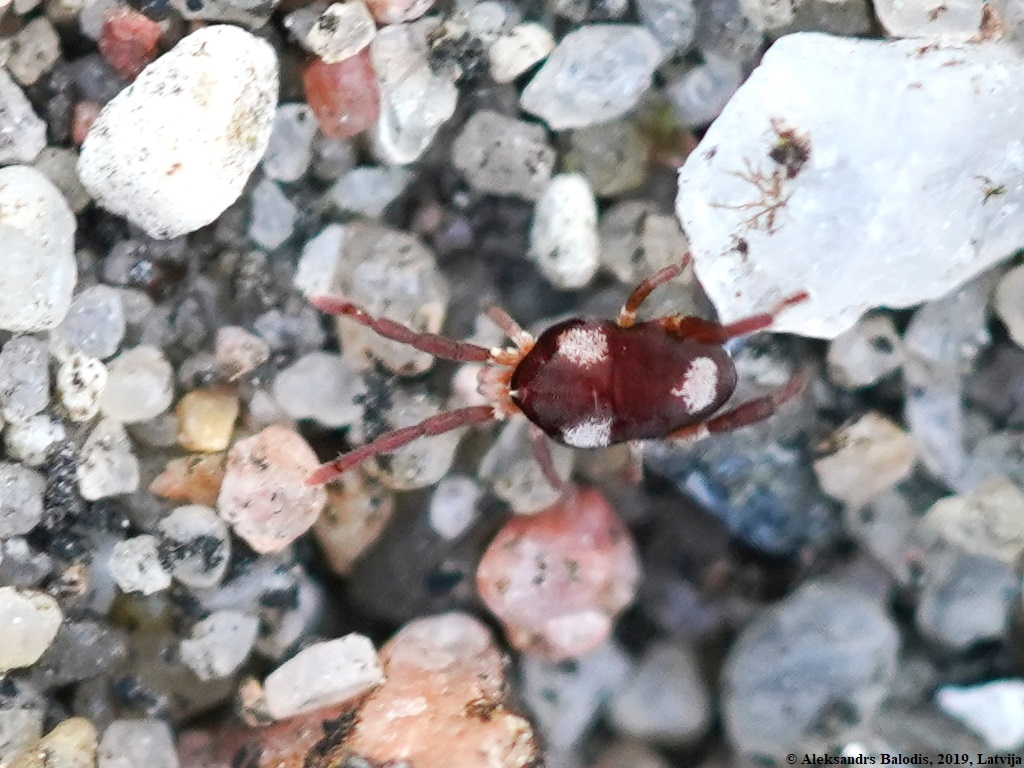
Leptus trimaculatus, Germany

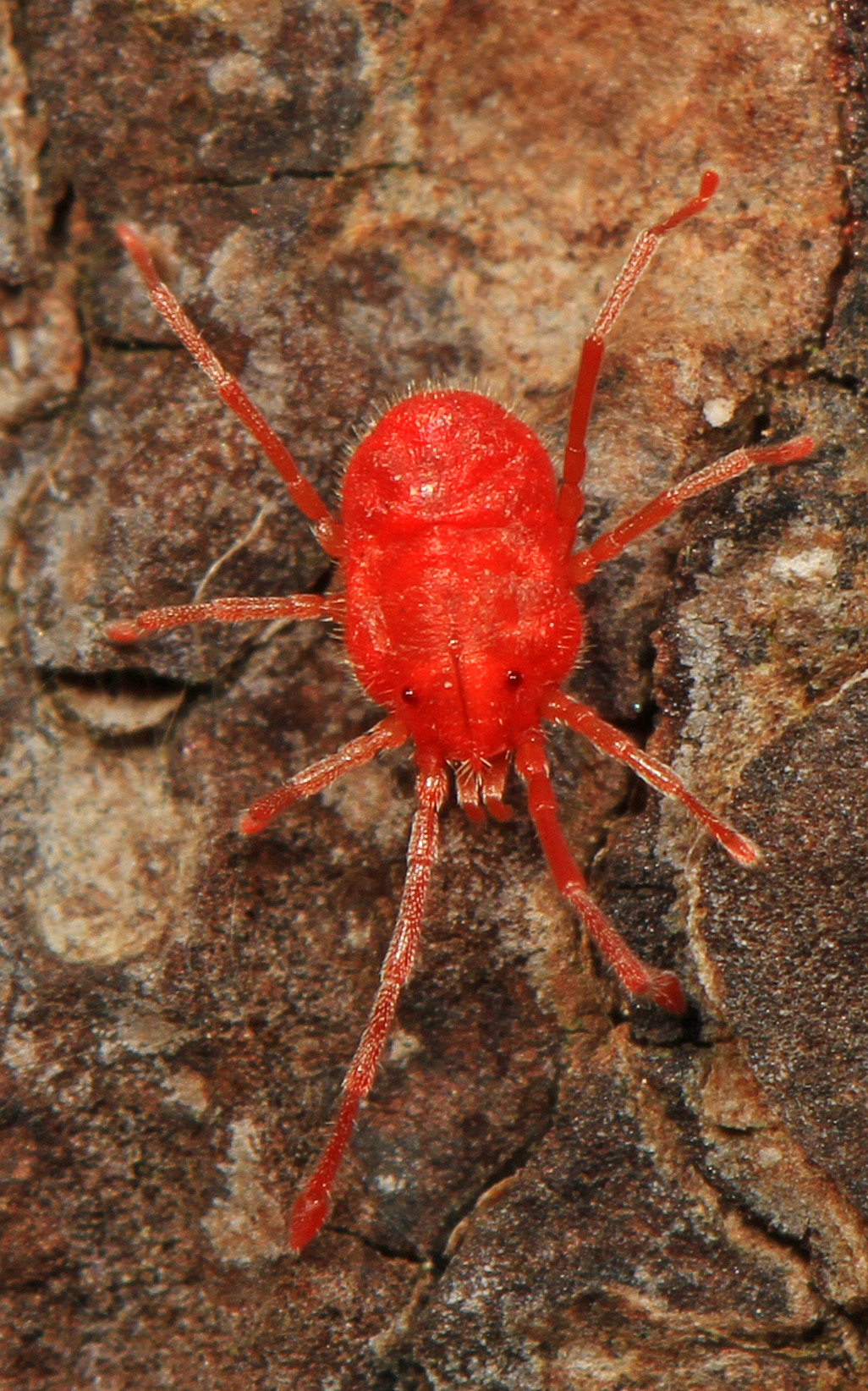
Callidosoma, Virginia

== Genera ==
These 62 genera belong to the family Erythraeidae:

Subfamily Abrolophinae Witte, 1995
Abrolophus Berlese, 1891
Grandjeanella Southcott, 1961
Marantelophus Haitlinger, 2011
Nagoricanella Haitlinger, 2009
Pukakia Clark, 2014
Subfamily Balaustiinae Grandjean, 1947
Balaustium von Heyden, 1826
Bursaustium Haitlinger, 2000
Fozustium Haitlinger, 2005
Italustium Haitlinger, 2000
Lomeustium Haitlinger, 2007
Madinahustium Kamran & Alatawi, 2016
Micromaris Hirst, 1926
Microsmarialla Khot, 1963
Moldoustium Haitlinger, 2008
Monteustium Haitlinger & Sundic, 2015
Mypongia Southcott, 1961
Neobalaustium Willmann, 1951
Pollux Southcott, 1961
Wartookia Southcott, 1961
Subfamily Callidosomatinae Southcott, 1957
Abrolophus Berlese, 1891
Andrevella Southcott, 1961
Caeculisoma Berlese, 1888
Callidosoma Womersley, 1936
Carastrum Southcott, 1988
Cecidopus Karsch, 1879
Charletonia Oudemans, 1910
Dambullaeus Haitlinger, 2001
Harpagella Southcott, 1996
Hauptmannia A.C. Oudemans, 1910
Iguatonia Haitlinger, 2004
Momorangia Southcott, 1972
Nagoricanella Haitlinger, 2009
Neoabrolophus Khot, 1965
Neomomorangia Fain & Santiago-Blay, 1993
Pukakia Clark, 2014
Pussardia Southcott, 1961
Subfamily Erythraeinae Robineau-Desvoidy, 1828
Augustsonella Southcott, 1961
Claverythraeus Trägårdh, 1937
Collemboerythraeus Noei et al., 2017
Curteria Southcott, 1961
Eatoniana Cambridge, 1898
Erythraeus Latreille, 1806
Erythraxus Southcott, 1961
Erythrellus Southcott, 1946
Erythrites Southcott, 1961
Erythroides Southcott, 1946
Forania Southcott, 1961
Helladerythraeus Beron, 1988
Kakamasia Lawrence, 1944
Kamertonia Gabrys, 2000
Lasioerythraeus Welbourn & Young, 1987
Makolia Saboori et al., 2009
Neophanolophus Shiba, 1976
Neosmaris Hirst, 1926
Paraphanolophus Smiley, 1968
Pararainbowia Dunlop, 2007
Podosmaridia Trägårdh, 1937
Proterythraeus Vercammen-Grandjean, 1973
Rainbowia Southcott, 1961
Ramsayella Z.-Q. Zhang, 2000
Taranakia Southcott, 1988
Tepoztlana Hoffmann & Mendez, 1973
Subfamily Leptinae Billberg, 1820
Leptus Latreille, 1796
Subfamily Myrmicotrombiinae Southcott, 1957
Myrmicotrombium Womersley, 1934
Subfamily Phanolophinae Southcott, 1946
Iraniella Karimi Iravanlou et al., 2002
Phanolophus André, 1927
