= List of Hypera species =

This is a list of species in Hypera, a genus of clover and alfalfa weevils in the family Curculionidae.

== Hypera species ==
- Hypera abrutiana Desbr., 1903-04^{c}
- Hypera acetosae Dejean, 1821^{c}
- Hypera aequabilis Marshall, 1934^{c}
- Hypera albonotata Pic, 1925^{c}
- Hypera albosquamosa Pic, 1904^{c}
- Hypera alternans Dejean, 1821^{c}
- Hypera amalek Petri, 1901^{c}
- Hypera amasiensis Faust, 1890^{c}
- Hypera amoena Sturm, 1826^{c}
- Hypera angustula Reitter, 1915^{c}
- Hypera anjumanensis Voss, 1963^{c}
- Hypera antiqua Giebel, C.G., 1856^{c g}
- Hypera arator (Linnaeus, C., 1758)^{c g}
- Hypera arnoldii Zaslavskij, 1967^{c}
- Hypera arundinis (Paykull, G. de, 1792)^{c g}
- Hypera arvernica Cap., 1867^{c}
- Hypera aubei Cap., 1867^{c}
- Hypera audax Faust, 1887^{c}
- Hypera auliensis Petri, 1901^{c}
- Hypera auriflua Waltl, 1835^{c}
- Hypera austera Boh. in Schoenh., 1834^{c}
- Hypera austriaca Dejean, 1821^{c}
- Hypera avernica Petri, 1901^{c}
- Hypera barnevillei Cap., 1868^{c}
- Hypera barrosi Petri, 1901^{c}
- Hypera bawosi E. Guér., 1894^{c}
- Hypera bidentata Champion, 1918^{c}
- Hypera biglobosa Kirsch, 1880^{c}
- Hypera biharica Petri, 1901^{c}
- Hypera bipunctata Germar, E.F., 1821^{c}
- Hypera bonvouloiri Cap., 1867^{c}
- Hypera borealis Krausse, 1900^{c}
- Hypera bosnica Petri, 1901^{c}
- Hypera bravardi Pic, 1925^{c}
- Hypera brucki Cap., 1867^{c}
- Hypera brunnipennis (Boheman, 1834)^{i b} (Egyptian alfalfa weevil)
- Hypera bucovinensis Penecke, 1928^{c}
- Hypera budensis Sturm, 1826^{c}
- Hypera bulgarica Kippenberg, 1986^{c}
- Hypera caliginosa Dejean,^{c}
- Hypera callosa Petri, 1901^{c}
- Hypera canescens Stephens, 1829^{c}
- Hypera capiomonti Petri, 1901^{c}
- Hypera carinicollis Petri, 1901^{c}
- Hypera carpathica Petri, 1901^{c}
- Hypera castor (LeConte, 1876)^{i g}
- Hypera caucasica Faust, 1887^{c}
- Hypera chevrolati Cap., 1868^{c}
- Hypera chlorocoma Boh. in Schoenh., 1842^{c}
- Hypera circassicola Reitt., 1888^{c}
- Hypera coarcticollis Krauss, 1900^{c}
- Hypera comata Dejean, 1821^{c}
- Hypera compta (Say, 1831)^{i b}
- Hypera conmaculata (Herbst, J.F.W., 1795)^{c g}
- Hypera constans Dejean, 1821^{c}
- Hypera contaminata (Herbst, J.F.W., 1795)^{c g}
- Hypera corcyrea Faust, 1887^{c}
- Hypera cordicollis Petri, 1901^{c}
- Hypera corrosa Desbr., 1899-1900^{c}
- Hypera crinita Dejean, 1821^{c}
- Hypera croatica Dejean, 1821^{c}
- Hypera curtirostris Pic, 1941^{c}
- Hypera curtithorax Pic, 1925^{c}
- Hypera cypris Reiche & Saulcy, 1857^{c}
- Hypera cyrta Germar, E.F., 1821^{c}
- Hypera damascena Stierl., 1888^{c}
- Hypera dauci Dejean, 1821^{c}
- Hypera delarouzei Cap., 1868^{c}
- Hypera deportata Boh. in Schoenh., 1842^{c}
- Hypera deserta (Panzer, G.W.F., 1796)^{c g}
- Hypera deyrollei Cap., 1868^{c}
- Hypera dissimilis Germar, E.F., 1821^{c}
- Hypera distinguenda Dejean,^{c}
- Hypera diversa Dejean,^{c}
- Hypera diversipunctata (Schrank, 1798)^{i c g b}
- Hypera dorica Petri, 1901^{c}
- Hypera dorsalis Sturm, 1826^{c}
- Hypera dubia Cap., 1868^{c}
- Hypera dubitabilis Hustache, 1946^{c}
- Hypera duplopunctata Petri, 1901^{c}
- Hypera educta Tempère, 1972^{c}
- Hypera elegans Sturm, 1826^{c}
- Hypera elongata Dejean, 1821^{c}
- Hypera eos Suvorov, 1912^{c}
- Hypera eximia (LeConte, 1876)^{i g}
- Hypera fabae Hoffmann, 1942^{c}
- Hypera fairmairei Cap., 1868^{c}
- Hypera fasciculata Germar, E.F., 1821^{c}
- Hypera fauconneti Pic, 1925^{c}
- Hypera fausti Petri, 1901^{c}
- Hypera favarcqui Pic, 1925^{c}
- Hypera fiumana Petri, 1901^{c}
- Hypera flavicans Dejean, 1821^{c}
- Hypera folwacznyi Dieckmann, 1975^{c}
- Hypera fulvipes Stephens, 1829^{c}
- Hypera fumipes Curtis, 1837^{c}
- Hypera fuscocinerea (Marsham, 1802)^{g}
- Hypera ganglbaueri Petri, 1901^{c}
- Hypera gemina Zaslavskij, 1967^{c}
- Hypera glacialis Lomnicki, 1894^{c}
- Hypera globosa Dejean, 1821^{c}
- Hypera gordiaea Petri, 1901^{c}
- Hypera gracilenta Skuhrovec, 2012^{c}
- Hypera gravida Dejean, 1821^{c}
- Hypera grisea Dejean, 1821^{c}
- Hypera grouvellei Hustache, 1929^{c}
- Hypera guttipes Cap., 1868^{c}
- Hypera helwigii Ziegler,^{c}
- Hypera hierichontica Cap., 1868^{c}
- Hypera hispidula Dejean, 1821^{c}
- Hypera hostilis Ziegler,^{c}
- Hypera humilis Dejean,^{c}
- Hypera iberica Cap., 1868^{c}
- Hypera idriensis Dahl, 1825^{c}
- Hypera imbecilla Faust, 1886^{c}
- Hypera insubida Germar,^{c}
- Hypera insularis Cap., 1867^{c}
- Hypera integrisquamis Voss, 1967^{c}
- Hypera johanni Reitt., 1896^{c}
- Hypera judaica Petri, 1901^{c}
- Hypera juvenca Motsch., 1859-1860^{c}
- Hypera kayali Skuhrovec, 2006^{c}
- Hypera kopalensis Suvorov, 1912^{c}
- Hypera korbi Petri, 1901^{c}
- Hypera kraatzi Cap., 1867^{c}
- Hypera kunzii Germar, 1822^{c}
- Hypera latifrons Petri, 1901^{c}
- Hypera leonisi Pic, 1925^{c}
- Hypera lhostei Hoffmann, 1938^{c}
- Hypera libanica Pic, 1914^{c}
- Hypera lindbergi Hoffmann, 1957^{c}
- Hypera lineata Stephens, 1829^{c}
- Hypera lineola Sturm, 1826^{c}
- Hypera litigiosa Dejean, 1830^{c}
- Hypera longicollis Petri, 1901^{c}
- Hypera longior Pic, 1941^{c}
- Hypera lucasi Cap., 1867^{c}
- Hypera lukjanovitshi Zaslavskij, 1964^{c}
- Hypera lunata Titus, 1911^{c}
- Hypera lurida Cristofori & Jan, 1832^{c}
- Hypera lusitanica Cap., 1868^{c}
- Hypera lydia Petri, 1901^{c}
- Hypera maculata W. Redt., 1842^{c}
- Hypera maculipennis Dejean, 1821^{c}
- Hypera maculosa Dejean, 1821^{c}
- Hypera maritima (Titus, 1911)^{i}
- Hypera marmorata Cap., 1867^{c}
- Hypera marmottani Cap., 1868^{c}
- Hypera mauritanica Cap., 1868^{c}
- Hypera medicaginis Marshall, 1913^{c}
- Hypera mehadiensis Sturm, 1826^{c}
- Hypera melancholica (Fabricius, J.C., 1792)^{c g}
- Hypera melarhyncha Germar, E.F., 1821^{c}
- Hypera meles (Fabricius, 1792)^{i c g b} (clover head weevil)
- Hypera meridionalis Villa & Villa, 1835^{c}
- Hypera micans Sturm, 186-^{c}
- Hypera miles Stephens, 1829^{c}
- Hypera minuta Petri, 1901^{c}
- Hypera mixta Dejean, 1821^{c}
- Hypera mniszechi Cap., 1867^{c}
- Hypera moczarskii Penecke, 1936^{c}
- Hypera montivaga Cap., 1868^{c}
- Hypera multifida Israelson, 1984^{c}
- Hypera murina Dejean, 1821^{c}
- Hypera mutabilis Germar, E.F., 1821^{c}
- Hypera mutatoria Faust, 1887^{c}
- Hypera nebulosa Stephens, 1831^{c}
- Hypera nigrescens Suvorov, 1912^{c}
- Hypera nigrirostris (Fabricius, 1775)^{i c g b} (black-beaked green weevil)
- Hypera nivosa Petri, 1901^{c}
- Hypera normandi Hoffmann, 1957^{c}
- Hypera noscibilis Faust, 1890^{c}
- Hypera noscidia Faust, 1889^{c}
- Hypera obscura Cap., 1867^{c}
- Hypera obtusa Rosh., 1856^{c}
- Hypera ocellata Champion, 1902-04^{c}
- Hypera okeni Gistl, J., 1835^{c}
- Hypera ononidis (Chevrolat, 1863)^{g}
- Hypera ophthalmica Desbr., 1898-99^{c}
- Hypera orientalis Cap., 1867^{c}
- Hypera ornata (Capiomont, 1864)^{g}
- Hypera ovalis Boh. in Schoenh., 1842^{c}
- Hypera oxalidis Smreczynski, 1926^{c}
- Hypera oxalis Dejean, 1821^{c}
- Hypera pallida Dejean, 1821^{c}
- Hypera paludicola Warner, 1973^{i c}
- Hypera palumbaria Germar, E.F., 1821^{c}
- Hypera palustris Stephens, 1831^{c}
- Hypera pantherina Cap., 1867^{c}
- Hypera parallela Dejean, 1821^{c}
- Hypera pastinacae (Rossi, P., 1790)^{c g}
- Hypera pedestris Dejean, 1821^{c}
- Hypera perplexa Cap., 1868^{c}
- Hypera perrisi Cap., 1868^{c}
- Hypera petrii Desbr., 1908^{c}
- Hypera phaeopa Stephens, 1829^{c}
- Hypera philanthus Dejean, 1821^{c}
- Hypera picicornis Stephens, 1831^{c}
- Hypera picipes Curtis, 1826^{c}
- Hypera pimpinellae Fischer de Waldheim, 1830^{c}
- Hypera plantaginis (DeGeer, C., 1775)^{c g}
- Hypera plochardi Cap., 1868^{c}
- Hypera pollux Germar, E.F., 1821^{c}
- Hypera polygoni Germar, 1817^{c}
- Hypera porcella Cap., 1868^{c}
- Hypera postica (Gyllenhal, 1813)^{i c g b} (alfalfa weevil)
- Hypera praecomata Lomnicki, 1894^{c}
- Hypera proxima Cap., 1875^{c}
- Hypera pruinosa Suvorov, 1912^{c}
- Hypera przewalskii Suvorov, 1912^{c}
- Hypera pseudotenuirostris Skuhrovec & Winkelmann, 2008^{c}
- Hypera pubescens Ziegler,^{c}
- Hypera pubicollis (LeConte, 1876)^{i g}
- Hypera punctata (Fabricius, 1775)^{i c}
- Hypera puncticauda Motsch. in Schrenck, 1860^{c}
- Hypera punctulata Dejean, 1821^{c}
- Hypera pusilla Petri, 1912^{c}
- Hypera pustulata (Frivaldszky, 1884)^{g}
- Hypera pyrenaea Cap., 1867^{c}
- Hypera pyrrhodactylus Stephens, 1829^{c}
- Hypera quadratocollis Petri, 1901^{c}
- Hypera quadricollis (LeConte, 1876)^{i g}
- Hypera reductirostris Pic, 1925^{c}
- Hypera reichei Cap., 1868^{c}
- Hypera reitteri Faust, 1887^{c}
- Hypera repanda Germar, E.F., 1821^{c}
- Hypera rotundata Cap., 1867^{c}
- Hypera rubi Krauss, 1900^{c}
- Hypera rudicollis Cap., 1868^{c}
- Hypera rufimembris Pic, 1925^{c}
- Hypera rufipes Stephens, 1829^{c}
- Hypera rugulosa Petri, 1901^{c}
- Hypera rumicis (Linnaeus, 1758)^{i c b}
- Hypera saulcyi Cap., 1867^{c}
- Hypera scanica Germar, 1817^{c}
- Hypera scapularis Chevr., 1860^{c}
- Hypera segnis Cap., 1867^{c}
- Hypera seigneurici Tempère, 1984^{c}
- Hypera septentrionalis Kippenberg, 1986^{c}
- Hypera seriata (Mannerheim, 1853)^{i g}
- Hypera siccensis Thompson, 2006^{c}
- Hypera sierrana Cap., 1868^{c}
- Hypera signata Grimmer, K.H.B., 1841^{c}
- Hypera socialis Boh. in Schoenh., 1842^{c}
- Hypera solida Petri, 1901^{c}
- Hypera sordida Dejean,^{c}
- Hypera souvorovi Fleisch., 1909^{c}
- Hypera spissa Boh. in Schoenh., 1842^{c}
- Hypera straminea Stephens, 1829^{c}
- Hypera striata Sturm, 1826^{c}
- Hypera stulta Faust, 1883^{c}
- Hypera suanetica Petri, 1901^{c}
- Hypera subfasciculata Zaslavskij, 1967^{c}
- Hypera sublineata Curtis, 1826^{c}
- Hypera subuniformis Pic, 1914^{c}
- Hypera sushkini Zaslavskij, 1979^{c}
- Hypera suspiciosa Germar, E.F., 1821^{c}
- Hypera swanetica Faust, 1887^{c}
- Hypera tamarisci Dejean, 1821^{c}
- Hypera taraxaci Dahl,^{c}
- Hypera taurica Zaslavskij, 1967^{c}
- Hypera temperei Hoffmann, 1958^{c}
- Hypera tesselata Dejean, 1821^{c}
- Hypera tigrina Waltl, 1835^{c}
- Hypera timida Dejean, 1830^{c}
- Hypera trifolii Dejean, 1821^{c}
- Hypera tristis Cristofori & Jan, 1832^{c}
- Hypera trivittata (Say, 1831)^{i g}
- Hypera tumida Dejean, 1821^{c}
- Hypera variabilis Sturm, 1826^{c}
- Hypera venusta (Fabricius, J.C., 1781)^{c g}
- Hypera viciae Stephens, 1831^{c}
- Hypera vicina Cristofori & Jan, 1832^{c}
- Hypera vidua Gené, 1837^{c}
- Hypera viennensis Sturm,^{c}
- Hypera villosula Curtis, 1826^{c}
- Hypera virescens Petri, 1901^{c}
- Hypera visnagae Cap., 1868^{c}

Data sources: i = ITIS, c = Catalogue of Life, g = GBIF, b = Bugguide.net
