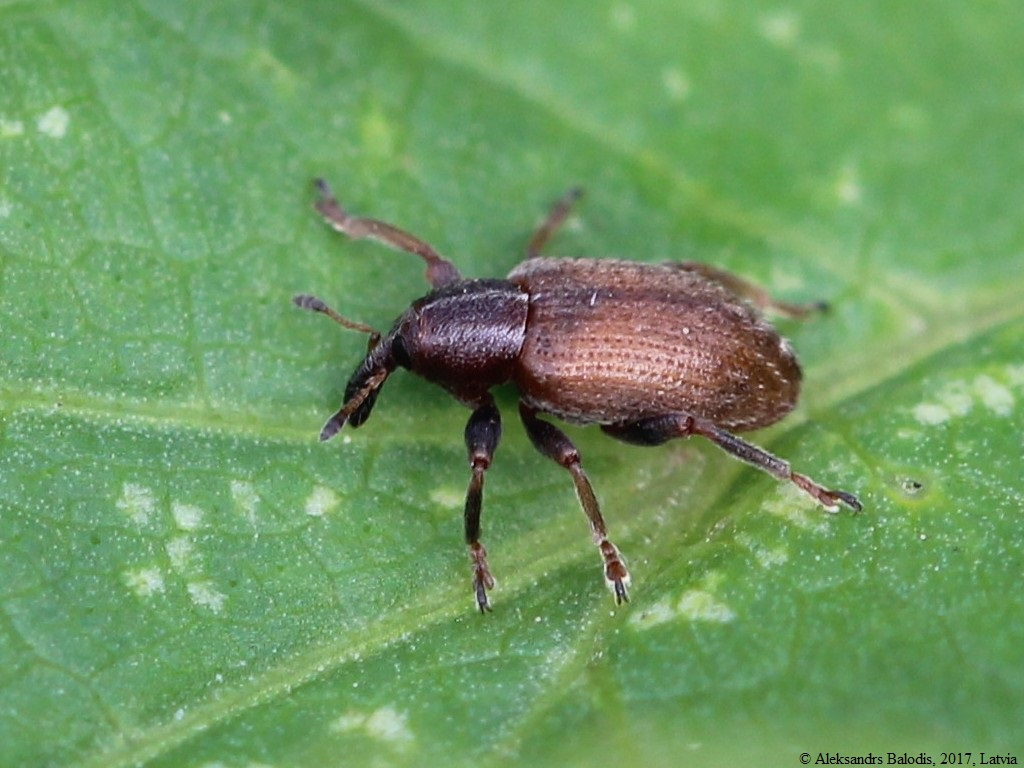

Scientific classification
- Kingdom: Animalia
- Phylum: Arthropoda
- Clade: Pancrustacea
- Class: Insecta
- Order: Coleoptera
- Suborder: Polyphaga
- Infraorder: Cucujiformia
- Superfamily: Curculionoidea
- Family: Curculionidae
- Genus: Hypera
- Species: H. meles

Binomial name
- Hypera meles (Fabricius, 1792)

= Hypera meles =

Species of beetle

Hypera meles, the clover head weevil, is a species of true weevil in the beetle family Curculionidae. It is found in North America and Europe.

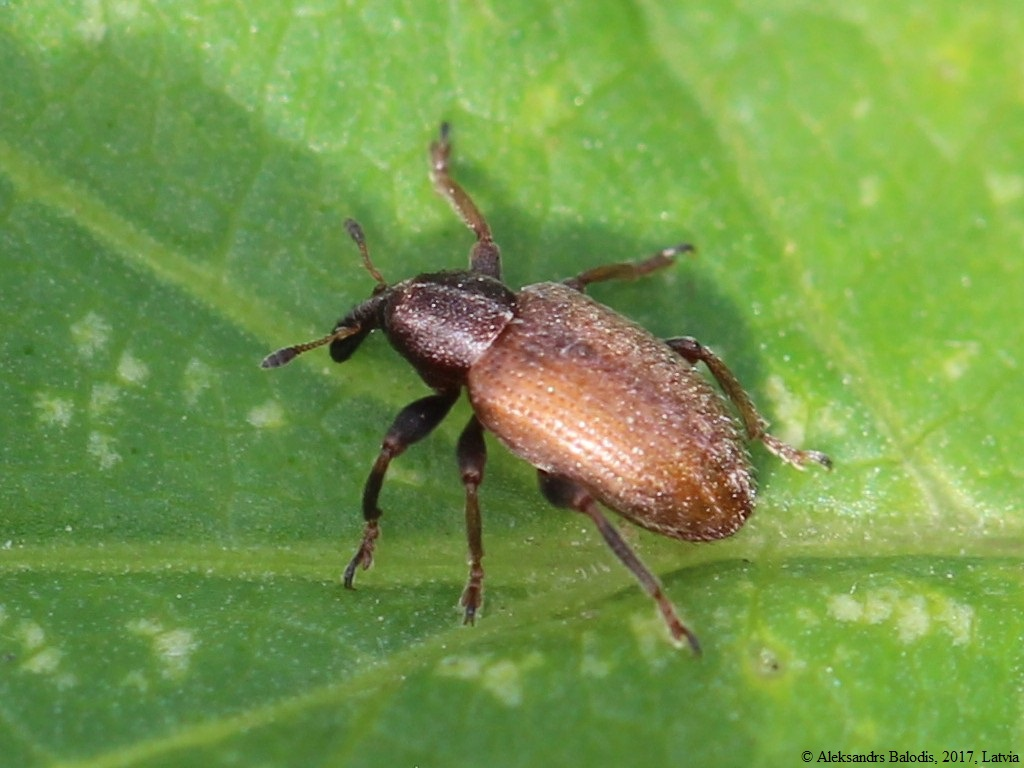
Clover head weevil, Hypera meles
