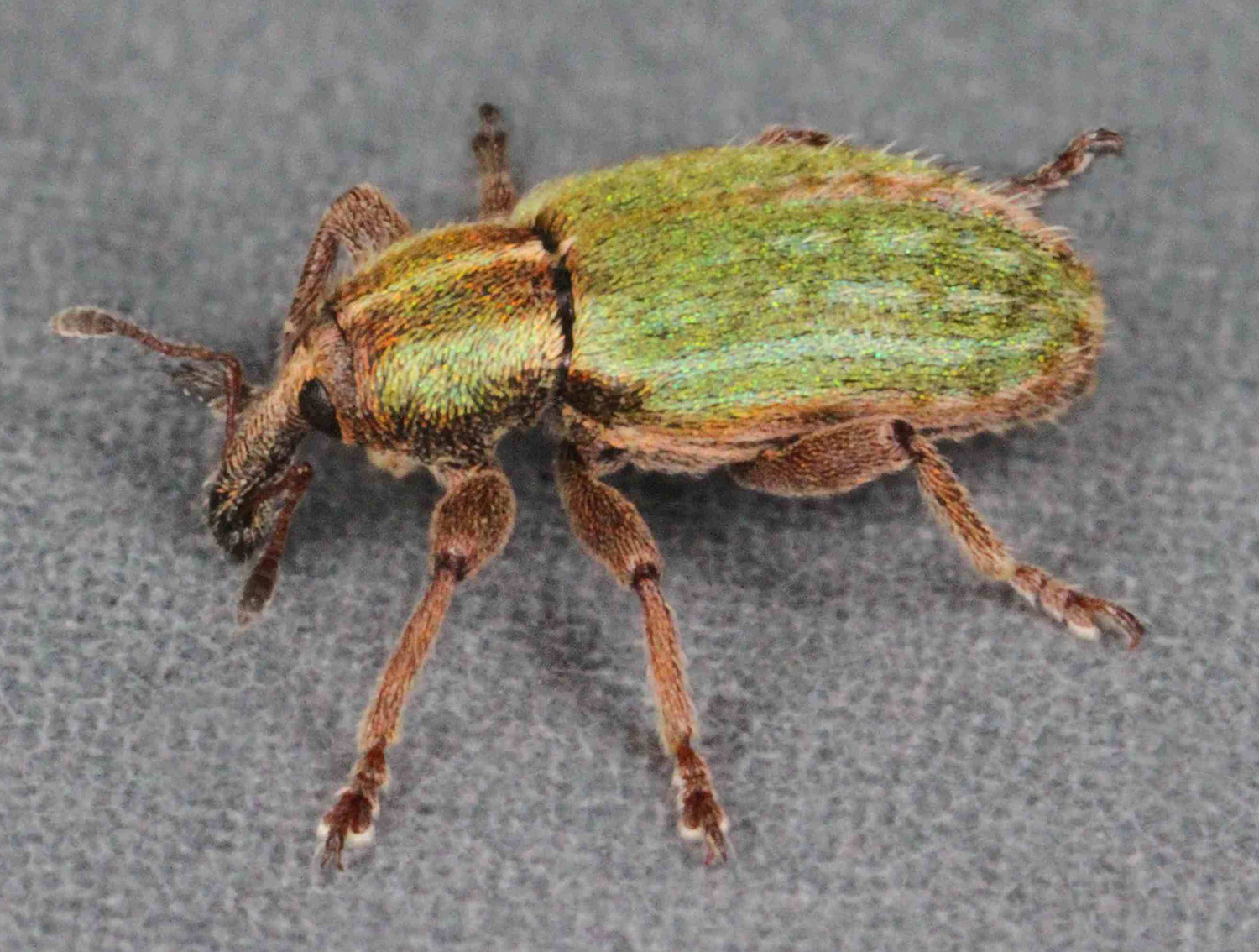

Scientific classification
- Domain: Eukaryota
- Kingdom: Animalia
- Phylum: Arthropoda
- Class: Insecta
- Order: Coleoptera
- Suborder: Polyphaga
- Infraorder: Cucujiformia
- Family: Curculionidae
- Genus: Hypera
- Species: H. nigrirostris

Binomial name
- Hypera nigrirostris (Fabricius, 1775)

= Hypera nigrirostris =

Species of beetle

Hypera nigrirostris, commonly known as the lesser clover leaf weevil, is a species of weevil that is native to Europe and northern Africa and has been introduced to North America and Japan. Both adults and larvae feed on red clover and other plants in the family Fabaceae.

== Description ==
The lesser clover leaf weevil grows to a length of about 3 to 4 mm (0.12 to 0.16 in). The rostrum or beak is three times as long as it is broad, and is notched at its base. The eyes are large, transverse and non-protuberant. The frons is narrower than the rostrum while the pronotum is broad. The proximal ends of the elytra have parallel sides and bear prominent humeral humps. The general colour of the insect is black, with a reddish tinge to the legs and antennae. The pronotum has a greenish-gold sheen and the elytra have a greenish metallic appearance, both being the result of the presence of dissected scales.

== Hosts ==
The lesser clover leaf weevil is an oligophage, limited to certain plants in the legume family. Its main hosts are red clover (Trifolium pratense), white clover (T. repens) and alsike clover (T. hybridum), but it can also feed on pea, alfalfa and vetch. Adults chew holes in leaves and create hollows in stems, while the larvae target the buds and flowers, each larva damaging some three or four inflorescences.

== Life cycle ==
In northeastern Saskatchewan, adults overwinter in fields of red clover. The insects become active in late April and eggs are laid between early May and mid-July inside the clover shoots, leaves and stipules. The developing larvae pass through four instars and feed on the stipules, buds and inflorescences of the clover. Pupation occurs between late June and August, on the plants or on the ground beneath. When the new generation of adults begin to emerge in late July, the density of the weevil population increases sharply. In Canada, this species is often parasitised by other insects and by an entomopathogenic fungus, which help to keep numbers under control.
