= Hypera brunnipennis =

Scientific classification
- Kingdom: Animalia
- Phylum: Arthropoda
- Class: Insecta
- Order: Coleoptera
- Suborder: Polyphaga
- Infraorder: Cucujiformia
- Family: Curculionidae
- Genus: Hypera
- Species: H. brunnipennis

Binomial name
- Hypera brunnipennis (Boheman, 1834)

Synonyms
- Phytonomus brunnipennis Boheman, 1834; Hypera brunneipennis (Boheman, 1834) (Misspelling)

Species of beetle

Hypera brunnipennis, the Egyptian alfalfa weevil, is a species of true weevil in the beetle family Curculionidae. The name is often misspelled as brunneipennis in the literature (e.g.,).
