= Hypera compta =

Scientific classification
- Domain: Eukaryota
- Kingdom: Animalia
- Phylum: Arthropoda
- Class: Insecta
- Order: Coleoptera
- Suborder: Polyphaga
- Infraorder: Cucujiformia
- Family: Curculionidae
- Genus: Hypera
- Species: H. compta

Binomial name
- Hypera compta (Say, 1831)

Synonyms
- Phytonomus diversus Gyllenhal, 1834

Species of beetle

Hypera compta is a species of true weevil in the family of beetles which is known as Curculionidae. It is found in North America.
