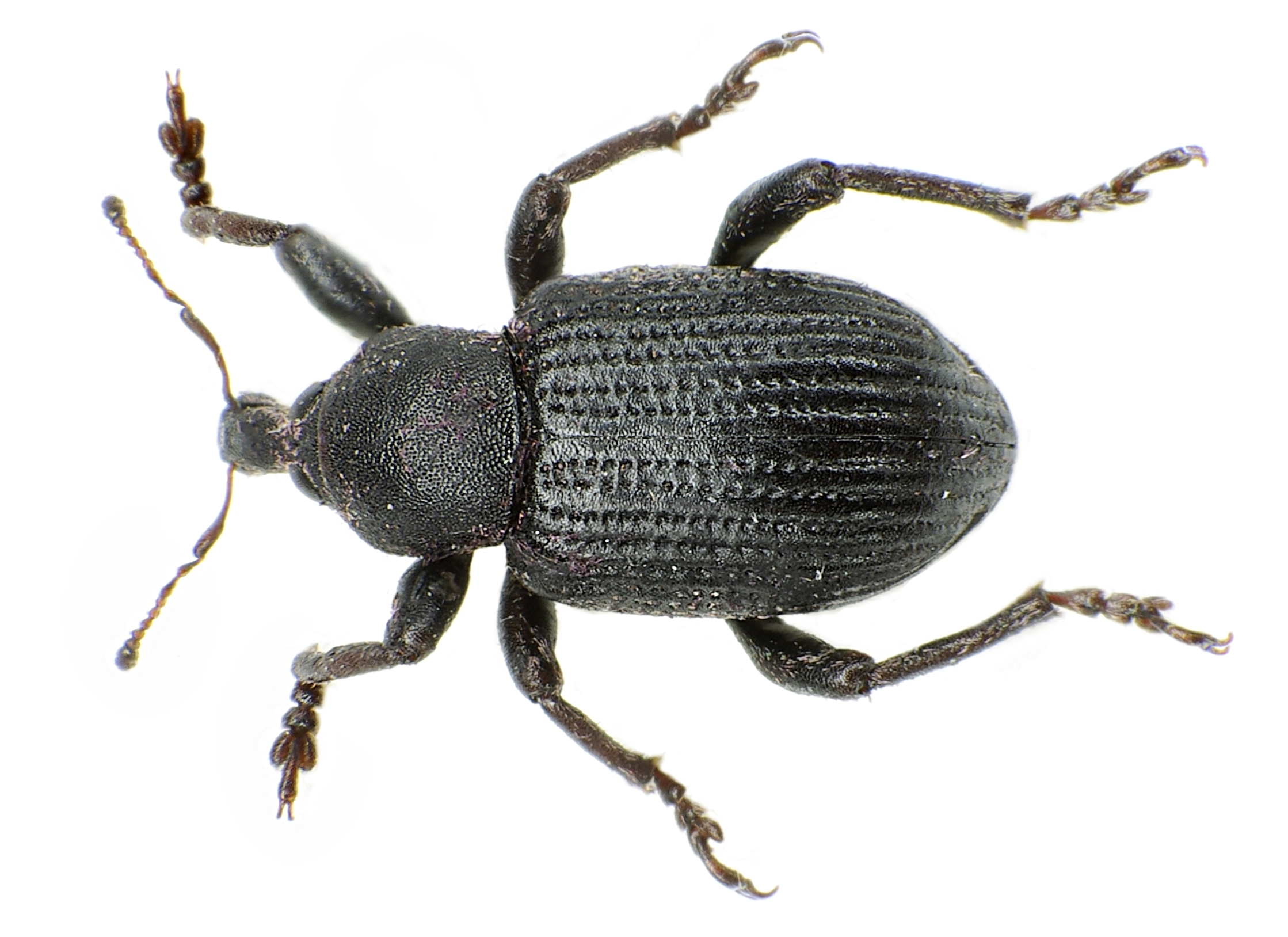

Scientific classification
- Kingdom: Animalia
- Phylum: Arthropoda
- Clade: Pancrustacea
- Class: Insecta
- Order: Coleoptera
- Suborder: Polyphaga
- Infraorder: Cucujiformia
- Superfamily: Curculionoidea
- Family: Curculionidae
- Genus: Hypera
- Species: H. diversipunctata

Binomial name
- Hypera diversipunctata (Schrank, 1798)

= Hypera diversipunctata =

Species of beetle

Hypera diversipunctata is a species of true weevil in the beetle family Curculionidae. It is found in North America and Europe.

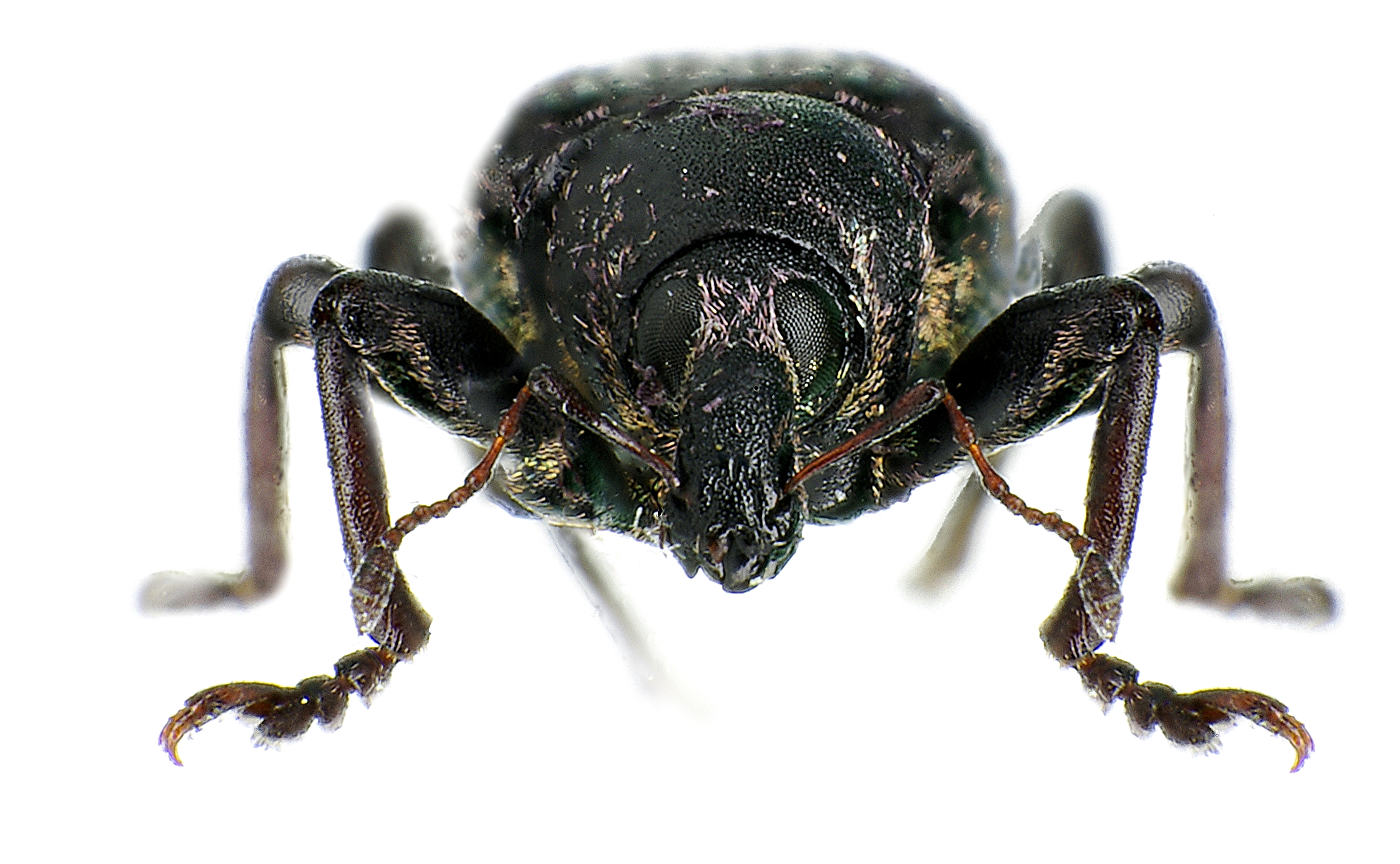

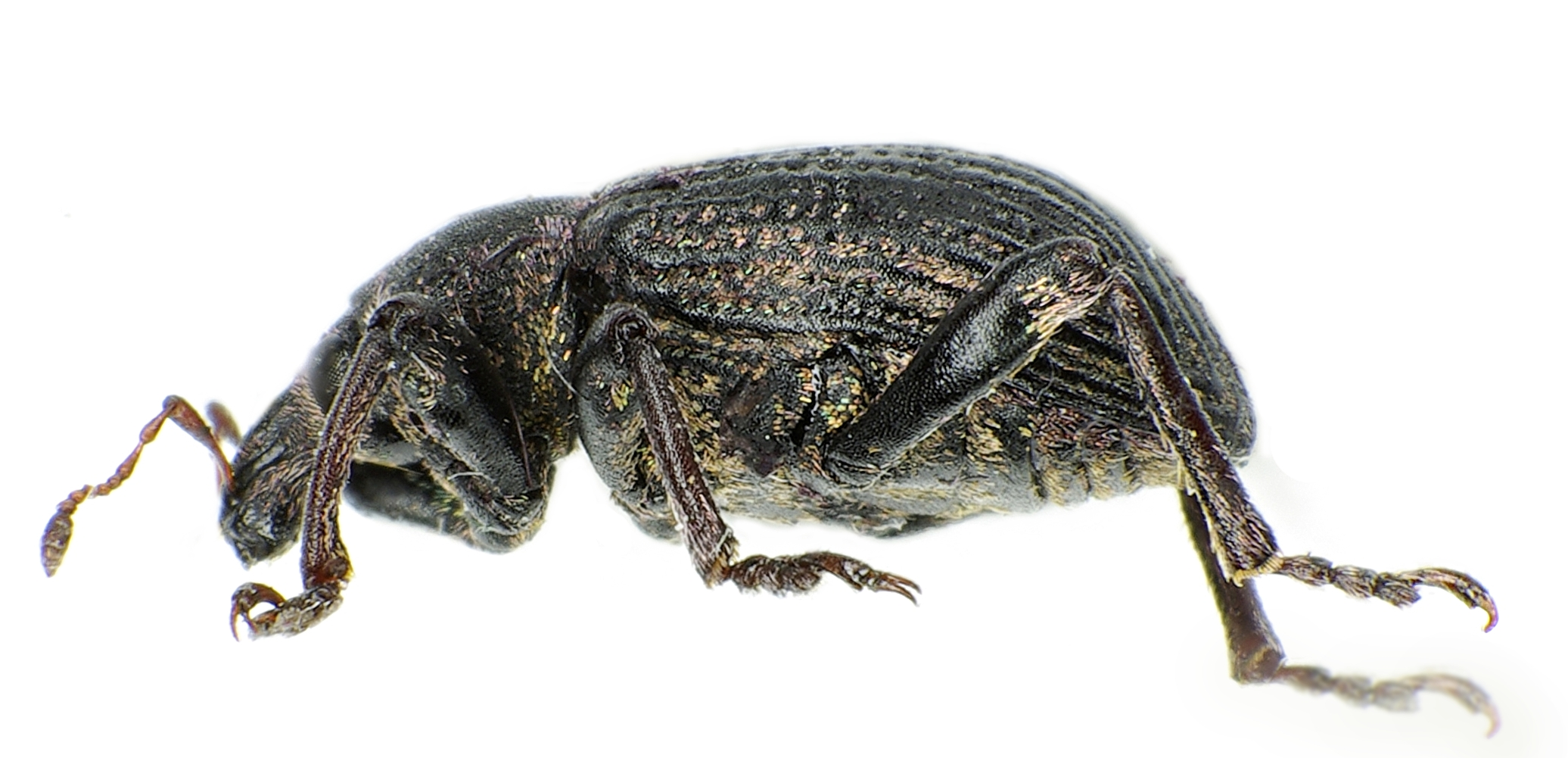

== Subspecies ==
These two subspecies belong to the species Hypera diversipunctata:

- Hypera diversipunctata educta Tempère, 1972
- Hypera diversipunctata seigneurici Tempère, 1984
