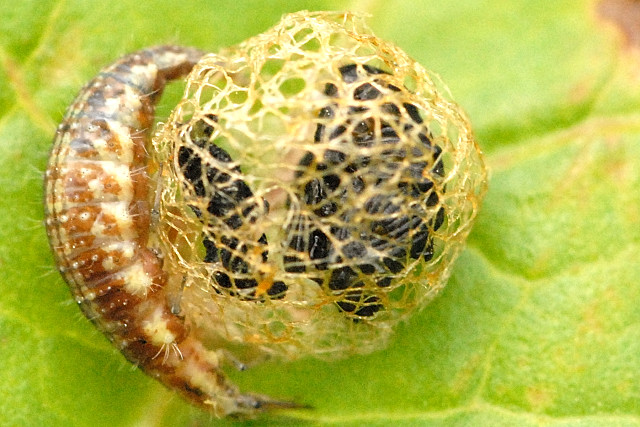

Scientific classification
- Kingdom: Animalia
- Phylum: Arthropoda
- Class: Insecta
- Order: Coleoptera
- Suborder: Polyphaga
- Infraorder: Cucujiformia
- Family: Curculionidae
- Genus: Hypera
- Species: H. rumicis

Binomial name
- Hypera rumicis (Linnaeus, 1758)

= Hypera rumicis =

Species of beetle

Hypera rumicis is a species of true weevil in the beetle family Curculionidae. It is found in North America and Europe.

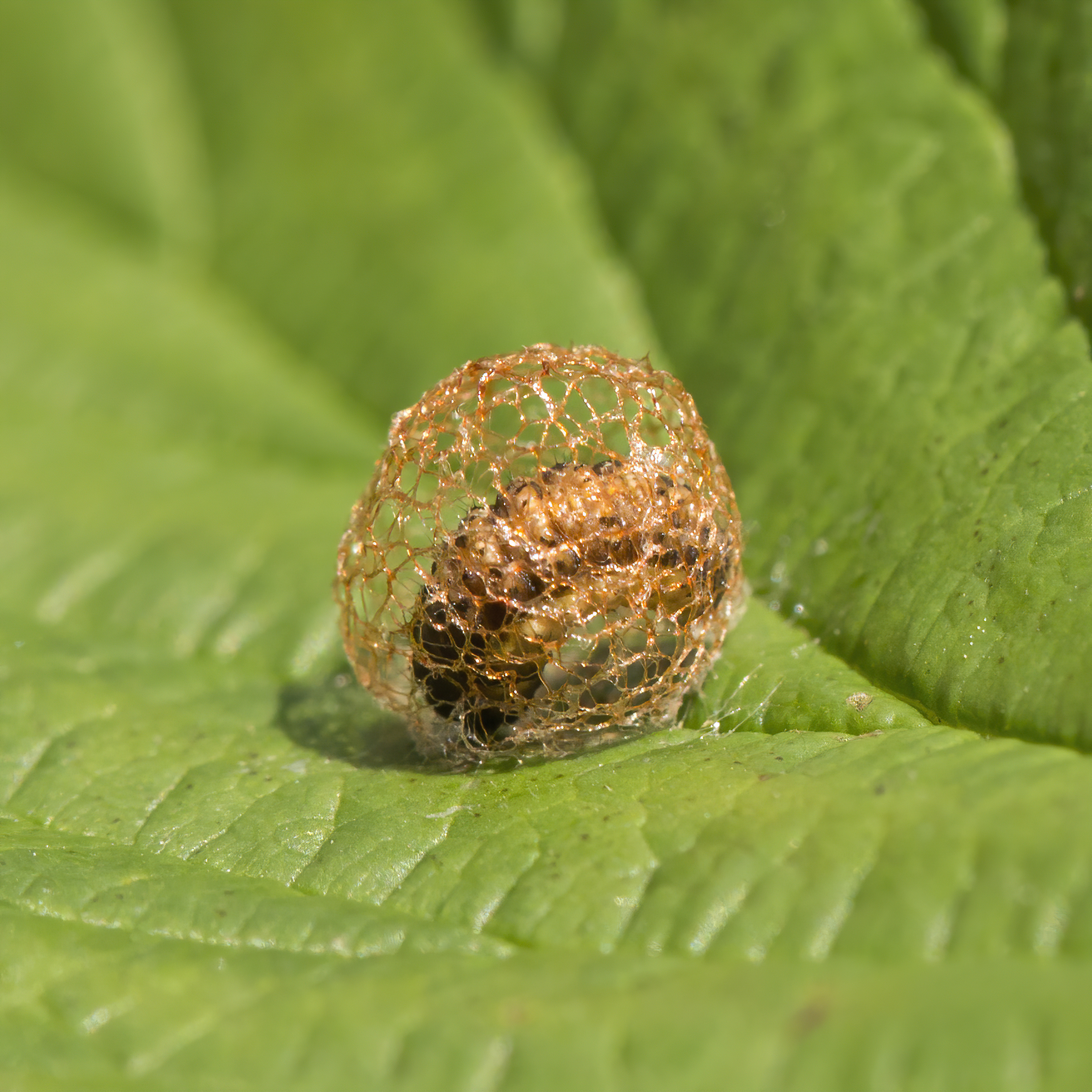
