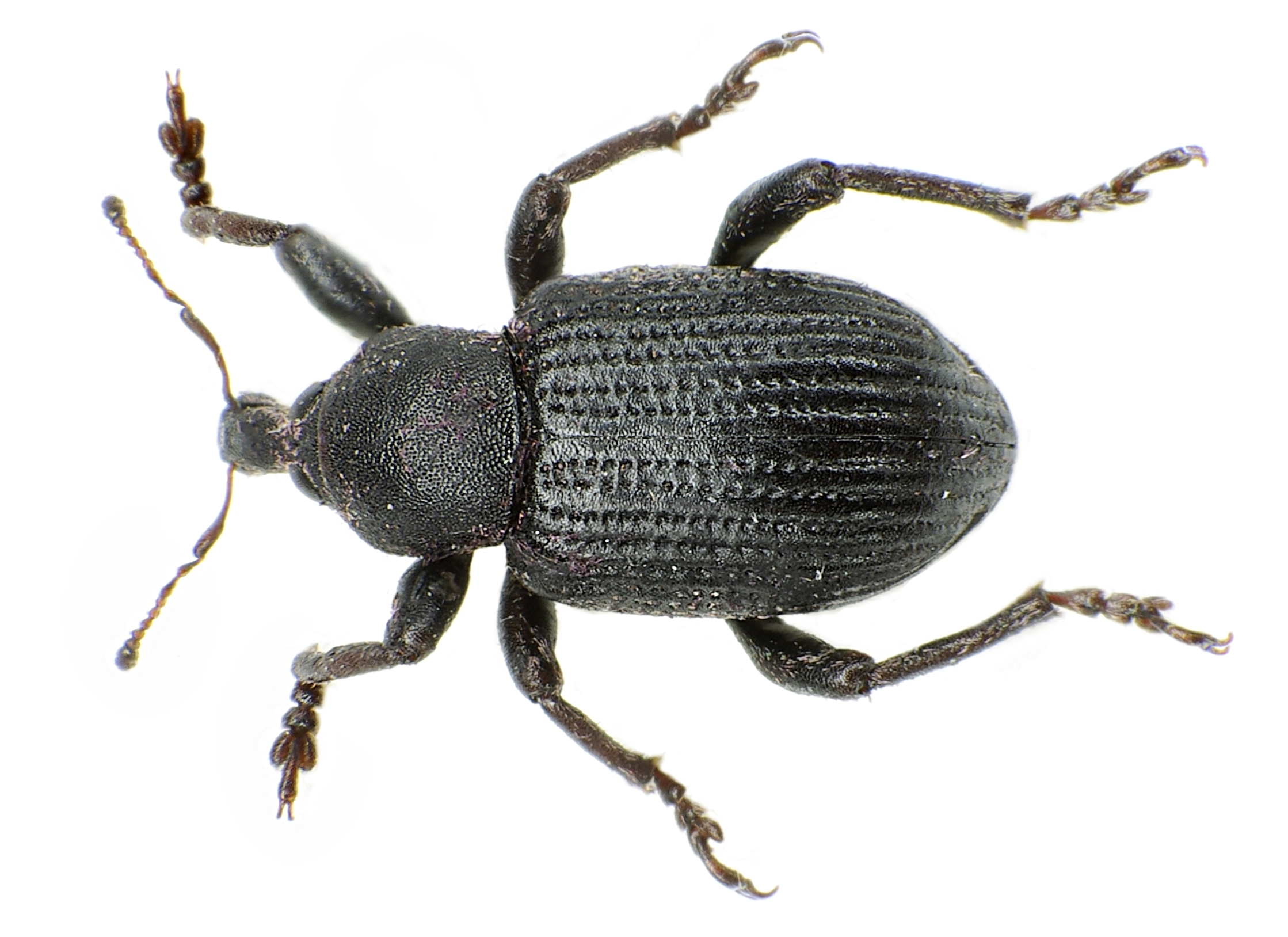
- Hypera diversipunctata

Scientific classification
- Domain: Eukaryota
- Kingdom: Animalia
- Phylum: Arthropoda
- Class: Insecta
- Order: Coleoptera
- Suborder: Polyphaga
- Infraorder: Cucujiformia
- Family: Curculionidae
- Subfamily: Hyperinae
- Tribe: Hyperini
- Genus: Hypera; Germar, 1817

Diversity
- at least 280 species

Synonyms
- Phytonomus Schönherr, 1823

= Hypera =

Genus of beetles

Hypera is a genus of clover and alfalfa weevils in the beetle family Curculionidae. There are at least 280 described species in Hypera.

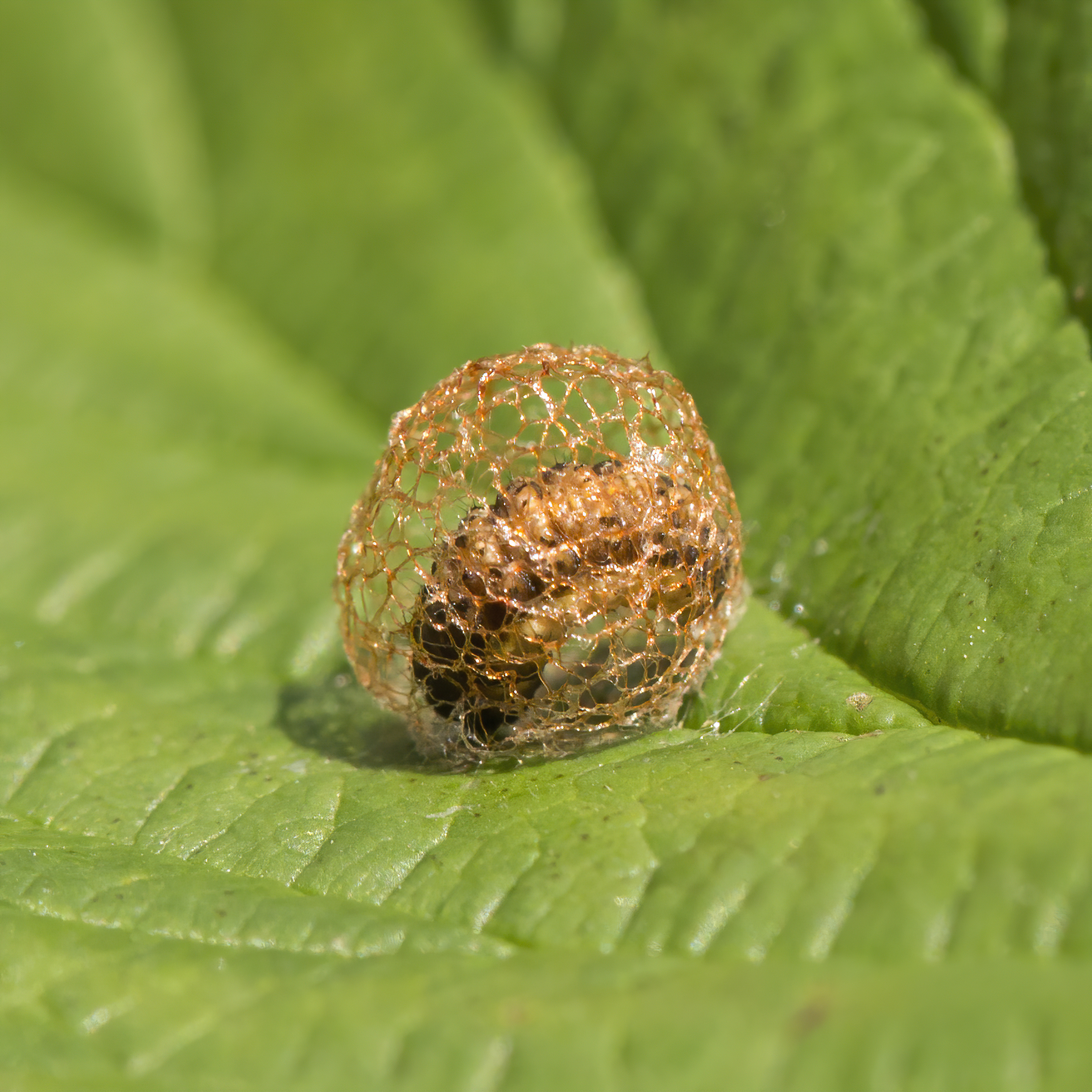
Hypera rumicis larva in cocoon

== See also ==
- List of Hypera species
