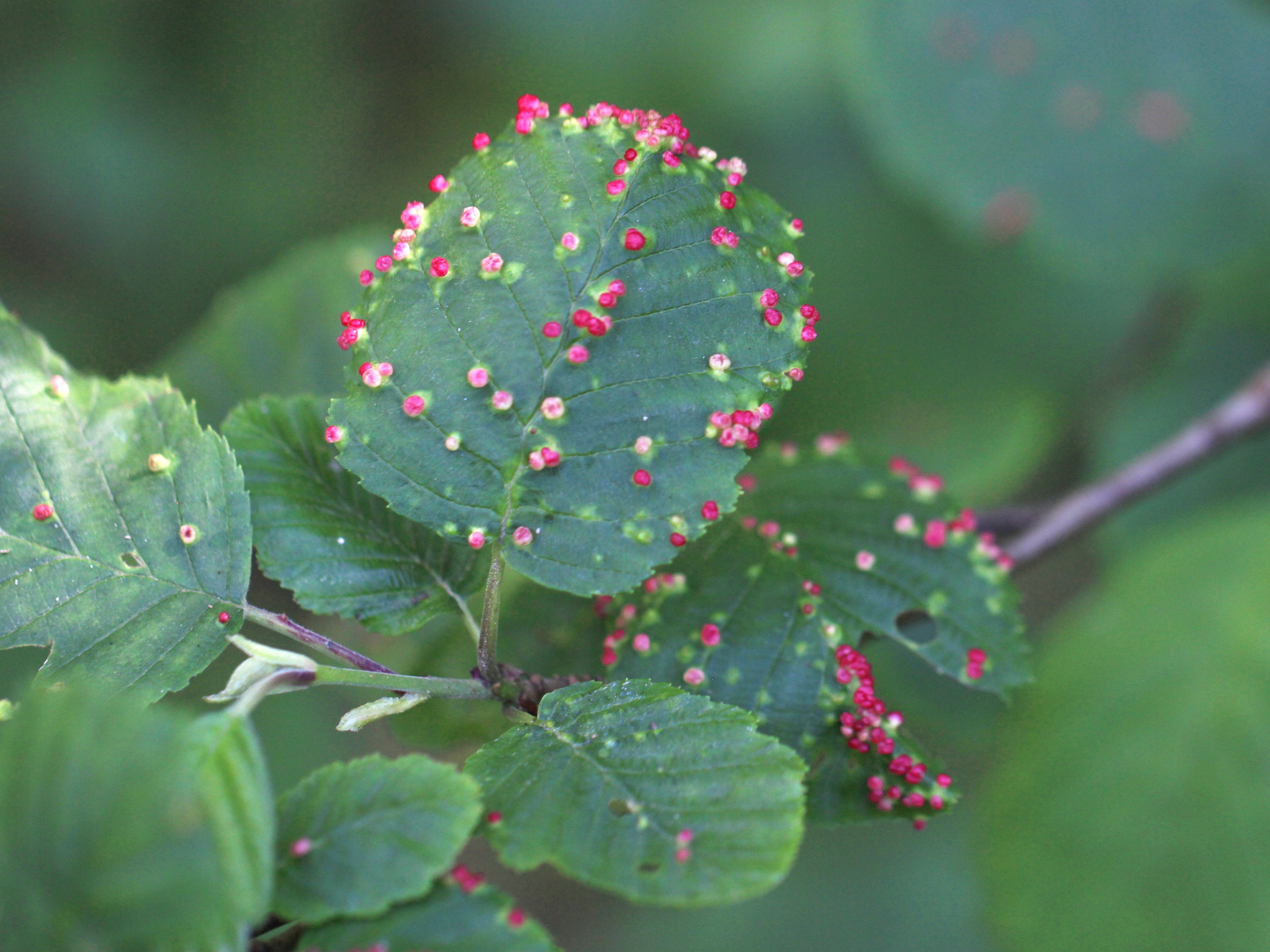
- Eriophyes laevis galls on alder

Scientific classification
- Domain: Eukaryota
- Kingdom: Animalia
- Phylum: Arthropoda
- Subphylum: Chelicerata
- Class: Arachnida
- Family: Eriophyidae
- Genus: Eriophyes
- Species: E. laevis

Binomial name
- Eriophyes laevis (Nalepa, 1889)

= Eriophyes laevis =

Species of mite

Eriophyes laevis is a gall mite which makes small, pimple-like galls on the leaves of alder (Alnus species). The mite was first described by the Austrian zoologist, Alfred Nalepa in 1889 and is found in Europe and North America.

== Description of the gall ==
Eriophyes laevis makes small, more or less, pimple-like galls, up to 2 mm in diameter. They can cover most of the leaf which can restrict growth. Each gall has a narrow opening on the underside of the leaf. The galls are green at first but usually become purple or red later in the year. The mites leave the gall in autumn and spend the winter in empty alder cones or bark crevices.

Species of tree galled include common alder (Alnus glutinosa), grey alder (Alnus incana) & subsp. rugosa + tenuifolia, x pubescens, red alder (Alnus rubra) and green alder (Alnus alnobetula). Leaves are occasionally infected by both this species and Eriophyes inangulis. Identification of gall mites on alder is tentative and the mites need to be examined for positive identification.

Inquiline

Diptacus sacramentae are mites found on the underside of leaves and also live commensally in the gall as an inquiline. D. sacramentae can also occur as an inquiline of E. inangulis.

== Distribution ==
The mite is found in Europe and the United States of America.
