= A. hystrix =

A. hystrix may refer to:

- Abacarus hystrix, the cereal rust mite or grain rust mite, a mite species
- Acromyrmex hystrix, an ant found in the New World

== See also ==
- Hystrix (disambiguation)
