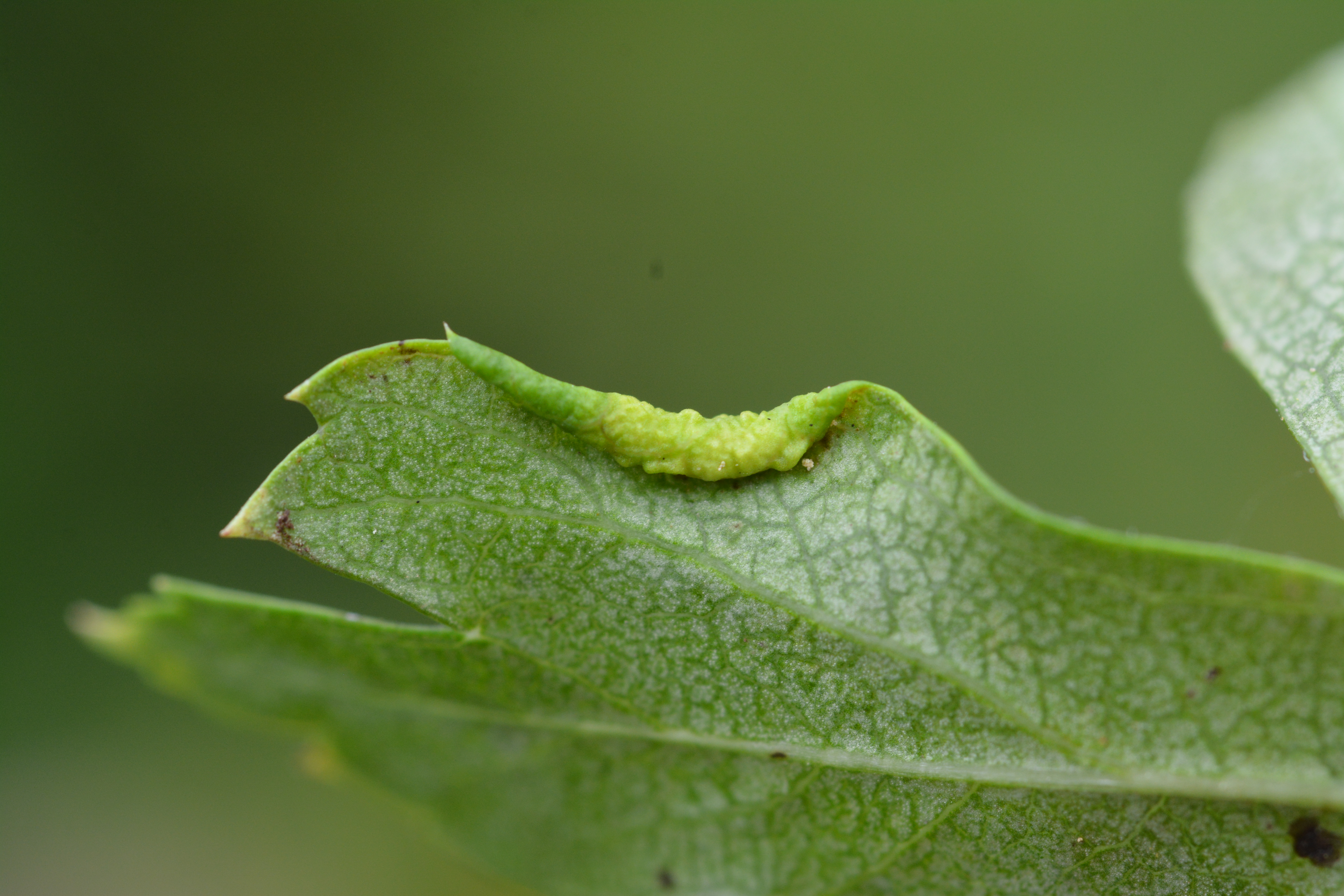

Scientific classification
- Domain: Eukaryota
- Kingdom: Animalia
- Phylum: Arthropoda
- Subphylum: Chelicerata
- Class: Arachnida
- Family: Eriophyidae
- Genus: Phyllocoptes
- Species: P. goniothorax

Binomial name
- Phyllocoptes goniothorax (Nalepa, 1889)

Synonyms
- Eriophyes goniothorax; Phytoptus goniothorax Nalepa, 1889

= Phyllocoptes goniothorax =

Species of mite

Phyllocoptes goniothorax is a species of mite belonging to the genus Phyllocoptes, which causes galls on the leaves of hawthorns (Crataegus species). It was first described by Alfred Nalepa in 1889.

== Description ==
There are two types of galls on the leaves of hawthorns. The mites overwinter in a bud or in bark crevices, emerging to attack the new leaves as soon as the buds open, forming tight rolls on the edge of the leaves. The leaf can have many of these yellowish or red galls, which are hairy inside. The mite can also form an erineum on the underside of a leaf with reddish, violet or white hairs with swollen tips.

The galls have been found on many different species of hawthorn, including, C. coccinoides, C. laevigata, C. macrocarpa, C. monogyna, C. nigra, C. rhipidophylla and C. sanguinea.

== Distribution ==
The mite is found in western Europe.
