= BRV =

BRV may refer to:

- Baboon orthoreovirus
- Constitution of the German Empire (Bismarcksche Reichsverfassung)
- Cecidophyopsis ribis or blackcurrant reversion virus, a plant pathogen
- Blue River virus, an RNA virus
- Bournville railway station in England
- Bremerhaven Airport, a former airfield in Germany, then IATA code
- Western Bru, an Austroasiatic language of Thailand, ISO 639 code
- Honda BR-V, a vehicle
- Bolivarian Republic of Venezuela
