= Eriophyes totarae =

Scientific classification
- Kingdom: Animalia
- Phylum: Arthropoda
- Subphylum: Chelicerata
- Class: Arachnida
- Family: Eriophyidae
- Genus: Eriophyes
- Species: E. totarae

Binomial name
- Eriophyes totarae Manson, 1984

Species of mite

Eriophyes totarae is a species of mite in the family Eriophyidae which is endemic to New Zealand.

== Range ==
New Zealand.

== Ecology ==
This mite attacks and grows on Podocarpus totara.

== Etymology ==
Totarae is a latinized word for totara, the Māori language word for Podocarpus totara. It is formed similarly to first declension nouns in the genitive singular, and would be a noun in apposition according to the International Code of Zoological Nomenclature.
