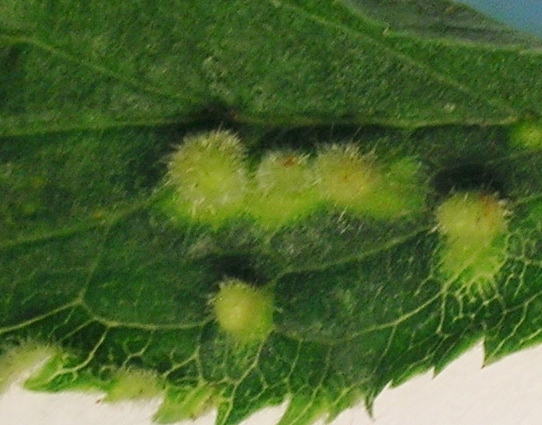
- Mature galls on upper surface of blackthorn leaf

Scientific classification
- Kingdom: Animalia
- Phylum: Arthropoda
- Subphylum: Chelicerata
- Class: Arachnida
- Order: Trombidiformes
- Family: Eriophyidae
- Genus: Phyllocoptes
- Species: P. eupadi

Binomial name
- Phyllocoptes eupadi (Newkirk, 1984)

= Phyllocoptes eupadi =

Species of mite

Phyllocoptes eupadi (Newkirk, 1984) is a mite that chemically induces a pouch gall to develop as a sub-spherical distortion rising up from the upper surface of the lamina of leaves of blackthorn shrubs Prunus padus, Prunus spinosa and other Prunus species. Synonyms are Phytoptus padi Nalepa, 1890 and "Eriophyes padi (Nalepa, 1890)", non Eriophyes padi Domes, 2000.

== Description ==
The gall's appearance on the upper surface is sub-spherical pustules, hairy and opening below, often clustering along the midrib, but also found over the whole leaf lamina surface and may vary in colour from pale yellow-green to deep red. The adult mite lives on sap, sucked from the cell tissues. The leaf surface can be so densely covered with galls that it becomes deformed and wrinkled.

== Distribution ==
The species is found across Northern and Central Europe, as well as in England and Scotland.

== Gallery ==
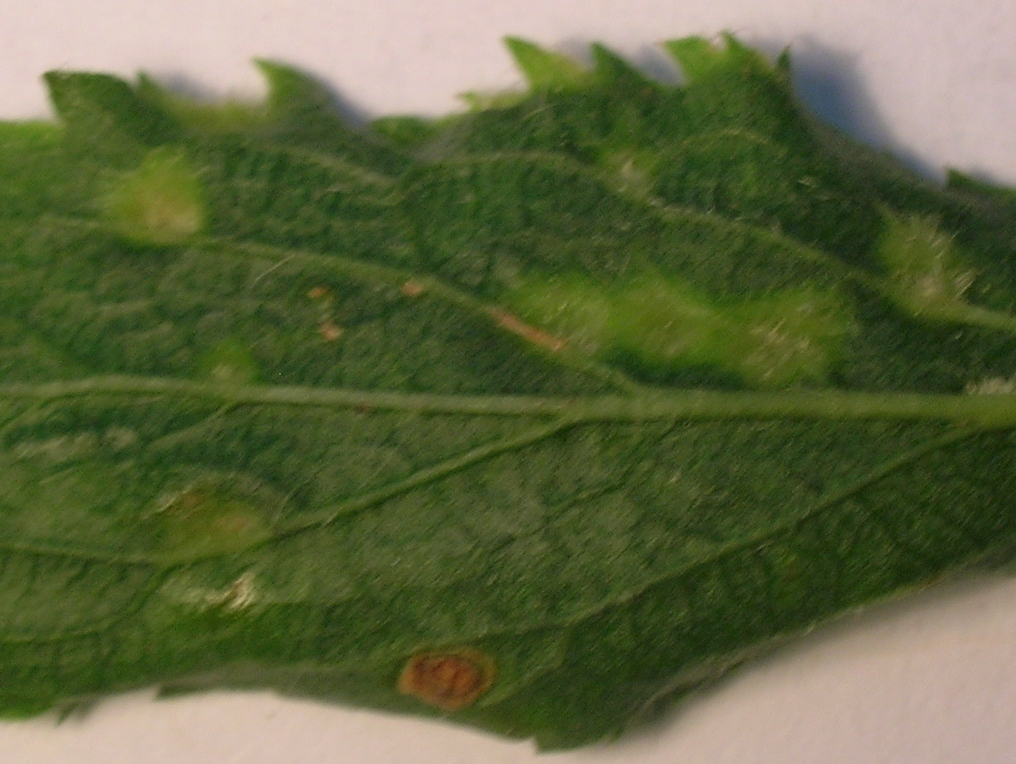
The lower epidermis of a Blackthorn leaf with P. eupadi galls.

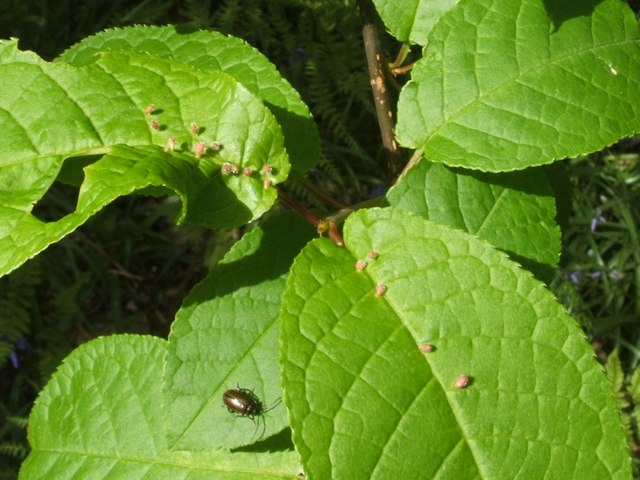
P.eupadi on a Bird Cherry leaf.
