= Aberoptus championus =

Scientific classification
- Domain: Eukaryota
- Kingdom: Animalia
- Phylum: Arthropoda
- Subphylum: Chelicerata
- Class: Arachnida
- Family: Eriophyidae
- Genus: Aberoptus
- Species: A. championus

Binomial name
- Aberoptus championus Huang, 2005

Species of mite

Aberoptus championus is a species of mite belonging to the family Eriophyidae. It is only known from females collected from underneath the leaves of Bauhinia championii in central Taiwan.

This is a virtually microscopic animal, with a length of only 120 μm. It is flattened and fusiform in shape. It can be distinguished from its closest congener, Aberoptus platessoides, by the lack of setae on the tibiae of the first pair of legs.
