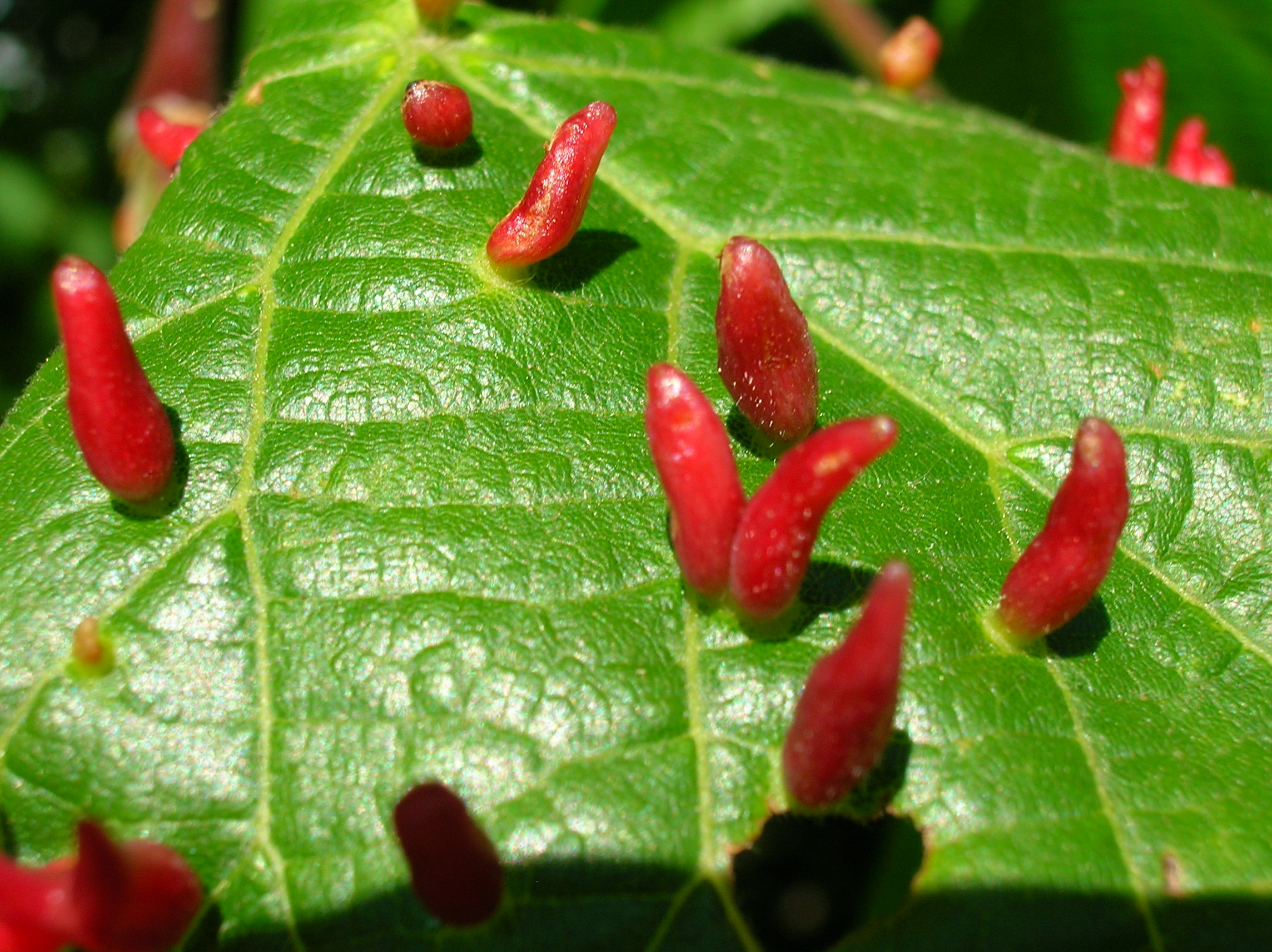
- Mature nail galls on a lime leaf

Scientific classification
- Kingdom: Animalia
- Phylum: Arthropoda
- Subphylum: Chelicerata
- Class: Arachnida
- Family: Eriophyidae
- Genus: Eriophyes
- Species: E. tiliae

Binomial name
- Eriophyes tiliae (H. A. Pagenstecher, 1857)

= Eriophyes tiliae =

Species of mite

Eriophyes tiliae is a mite that forms the lime nail gall or bugle gall. It develops in a chemically induced gall; an erect, oblique or curved distortion rising up from the upper surface of the leaves of the lime (linden) trees (genus Tilia), such as the large-leaved lime tree Tilia platyphyllos, the common lime tree Tilia × europaea, etc.

== Description ==
During late spring and summer, tubular growths up to 5 millimetres (0.20 in) long develop apically on the leaves of Tilia sp. These galls are yellow-green or red in color, may be very numerous, and predominantly occur on the lower leaves in some sub-species.

The galls appear not to affect the health of their hosts, and no way of controlling or preventing them exists.

== Taxonomy ==
Several sub-species have been identified, partly identified by their positioning on the leaves in relation to the veins and other structures.

== Life cycle ==
A leaf infected with E. tiliae

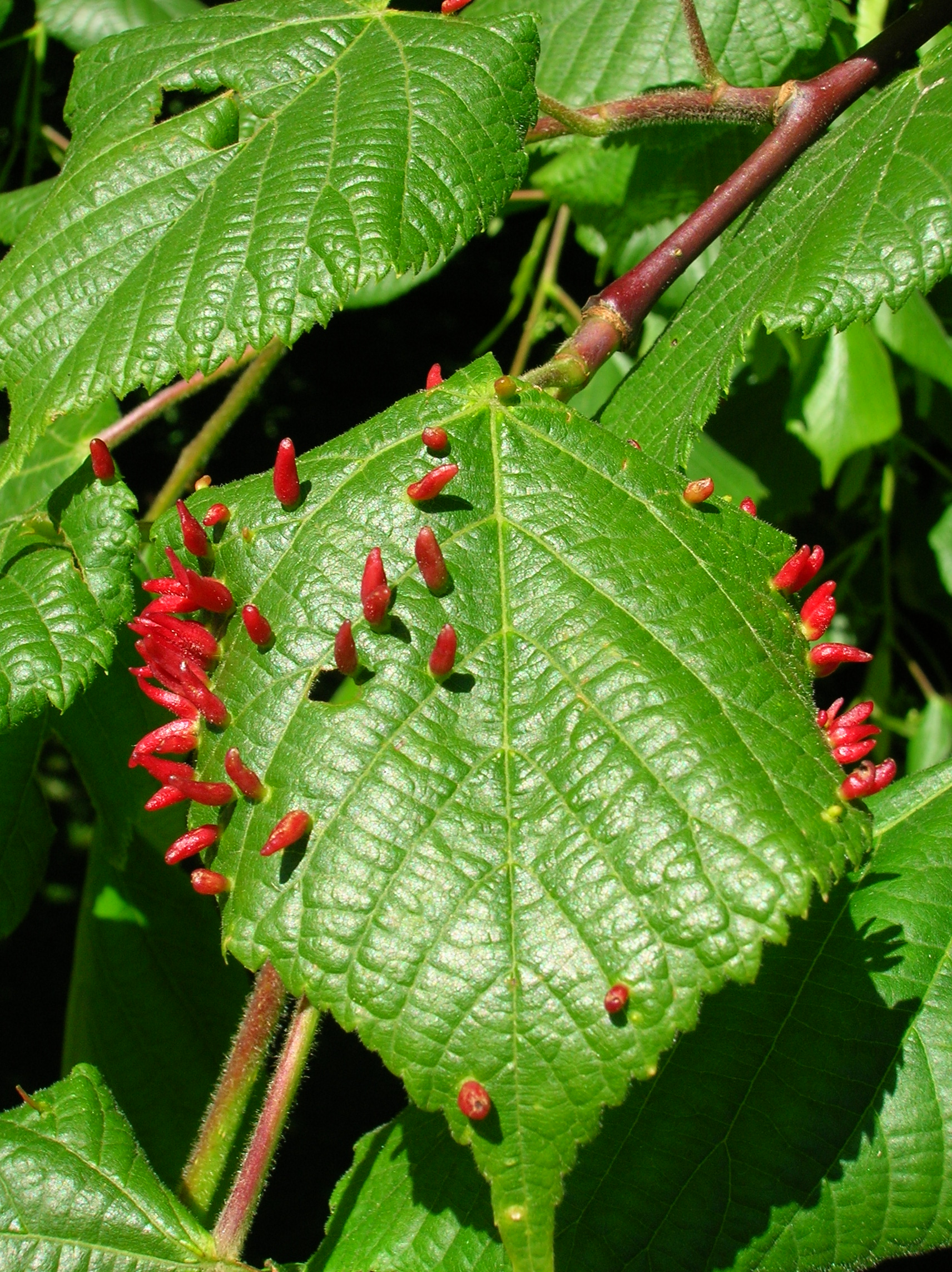
Upper surface

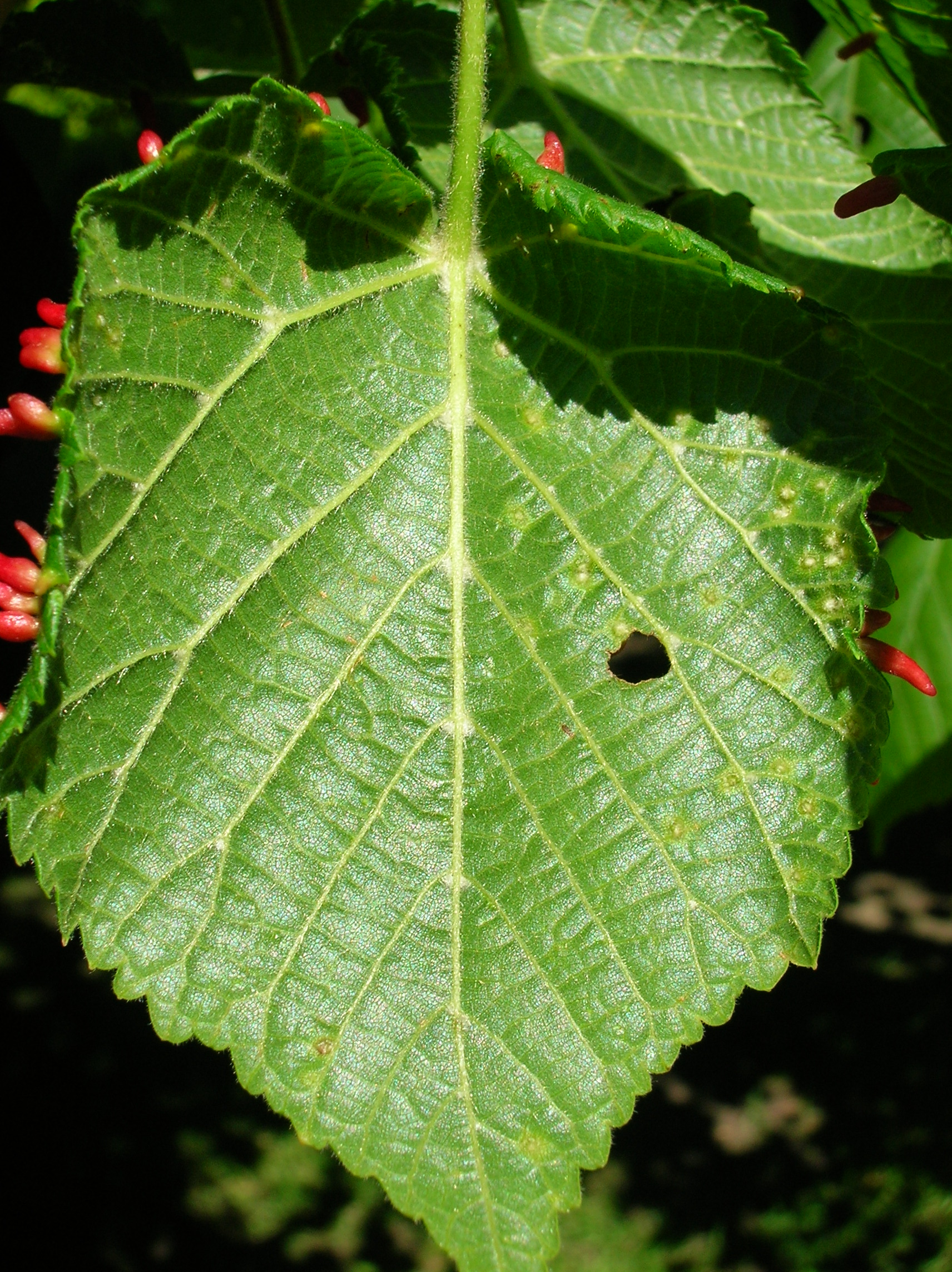
Lower surface

The mites move onto the foliage in the spring, having overwintered in bark crevices and around buds. Individually, Eriophyes tiliae are less than 0.2 mm long, but the chemicals they release while drinking sap from the lower leaf epidermis have a dramatic, consistent and colourful effect. An upright, hollow, red finger-like extension grows from the leaf around the mite. Before the autumn, the mites, which up to now have been actively feeding and growing inside the galls, depart from these shelters and seek protected sites elsewhere on the tree. The mites will pass the winter in such locations and then the cycle will be repeated. This species is one amongst a number of gall-formers which can be superficially similar in appearance; however E. tiliae tiliae is restricted to lime trees.

== See also ==
- Eriophyes inangulis
- Oak marble gall
- Oak apple
- Oak artichoke gall
- Cola-nut gall
