= C. hystrix =

C. hystrix may refer to:

- Castanopsis hystrix, a tree species
- Citrus hystrix, the kaffir lime, a fruit tree species native to Indochinese and Malesian ecoregions

== See also ==
- Hystrix (disambiguation)
