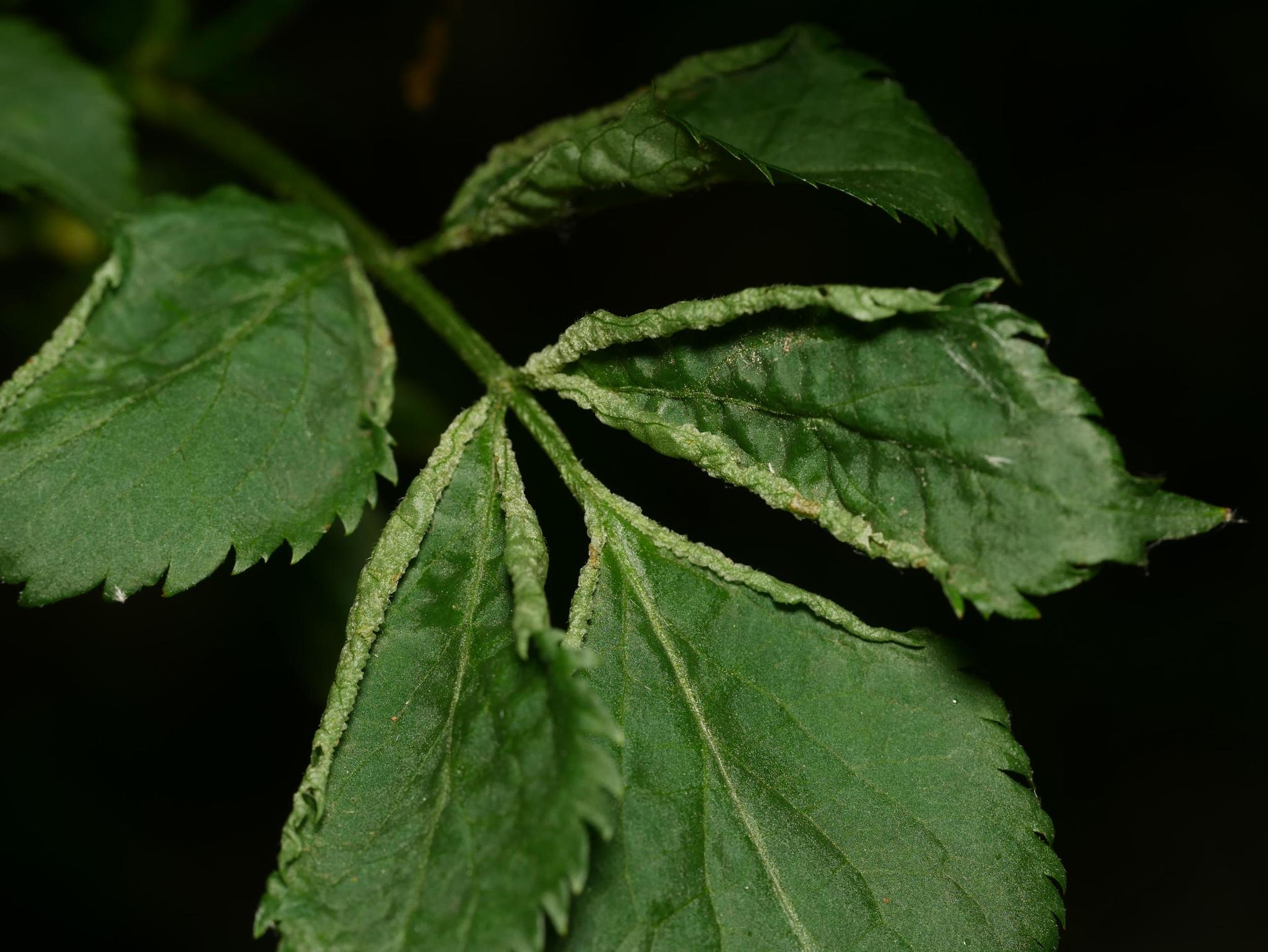
- Gall

Scientific classification
- Kingdom: Animalia
- Phylum: Arthropoda
- Subphylum: Chelicerata
- Class: Arachnida
- Family: Eriophyidae
- Genus: Epitrimerus
- Species: E. trilobus

Binomial name
- Epitrimerus trilobus (Nalepa, 1891)

Synonyms
- Cecidophyes trilobus Nalepa, 1891

= Epitrimerus trilobus =

Species of mite

Epitrimerus trilobus is a gall mite in the family Eriophyidae, found in Europe. The mites feed on the leaves of elder (Sambucus species), causing abnormal plant growths known as galls. The mite was described by the Austrian zoologist, Alfred Nalepa in 1891.

== Description of the gall ==
Epitrimerus trilobus makes upward rolls on the leaves of elder or elderberry. The rolls can be 1–5 millimetres (0.039–0.197 in) wide, loose or tight and can cover the whole of the leaf. Alternatively young leaves can be severely crumpled, failing to open properly. Species of elder galled include, American black elderberry (Sambucus canadensis), European elder (Sambucus nigra), red elderberry (Sambucus racemosa). Galls on dwarf elder (Sambucus ebulus) may be caused by an undetermined Epitrimerus species.

The mites feed on the leaves, the surface of the leaf decreases and photosynthesis is reduced, which can result in premature leaf fall. Young and small trees under heavy attack can die. The elder aphid (Aphis sambuci) causes similar injury. The mites leave the galls in late summer and spend the winter in bark crevices or buds.

== Distribution ==
Epitrimerus trilobus is found in Europe and California, USA.
