= Eriophyes tulipae =

Scientific classification
- Domain: Eukaryota
- Kingdom: Animalia
- Phylum: Arthropoda
- Subphylum: Chelicerata
- Class: Arachnida
- Family: Eriophyidae
- Genus: Eriophyes
- Species: E. tulipae

Binomial name
- Eriophyes tulipae Keifer, 1938

Species of mite

Eriophyes tulipae, commonly known as the dry bulb mite, is a species of mite in the genus Eriophyes. This mite feeds on members of the lily family, and has damaged garlic crops. At one time, it was also thought to feed on wheat and other grasses, but the wheat curl mite is now regarded as a different species, Aceria tosichella.

== Taxonomy ==
This mite was first described in 1938 by the German zoologist Friedrich Kiefer. It was believed to be found across Europe, Asia and North America, feeding on grasses and plants in the lily family. As such, it was thought to be a vector of the wheat streak mosaic virus, but it was later realised that the mites feeding on grasses and lilies were different species, and the wheat curl mite is now classified as Aceria tosichella, with Eriophyes tulipae being restricted to bulbous plants.

== Description ==
Eriophyes tulipae is a small cylindrical mite tapering towards the front and back, with an adult length of 0.25 mm (0.01 in). The gnathosoma bears a pair of featherclaws by way of mouthparts. The prosoma and the opisthosoma are continuous and there are no legs or ocelli. The few setae on the body point towards the rear and there are tubercles along the rear margin of the shield. The posterior end has an anal sucker.

== Biology ==
Eriophyes tulipae feeds on the green plant tissues of members of the lily family. The life cycle consists of an egg stage, two nymphal stages and an adult stage. The first stage nymph has dorsal setae that do not point towards the rear, and these change orientation at the moult at the end of this stage.

In Central America, this mite is a crop pest of garlic. The mites live between the layers of the garlic cloves and inside the leaves, and form small galls. The garlic bulbs may fail to develop and the leaves may turn yellow. The mites can be dispersed by wind, having climbed to the upper parts of the plant.

== Distribution ==
The dry bulb mite is found on all continents except Antarctica (Africa, Asia, Europe, North America, Oceania, South America).
