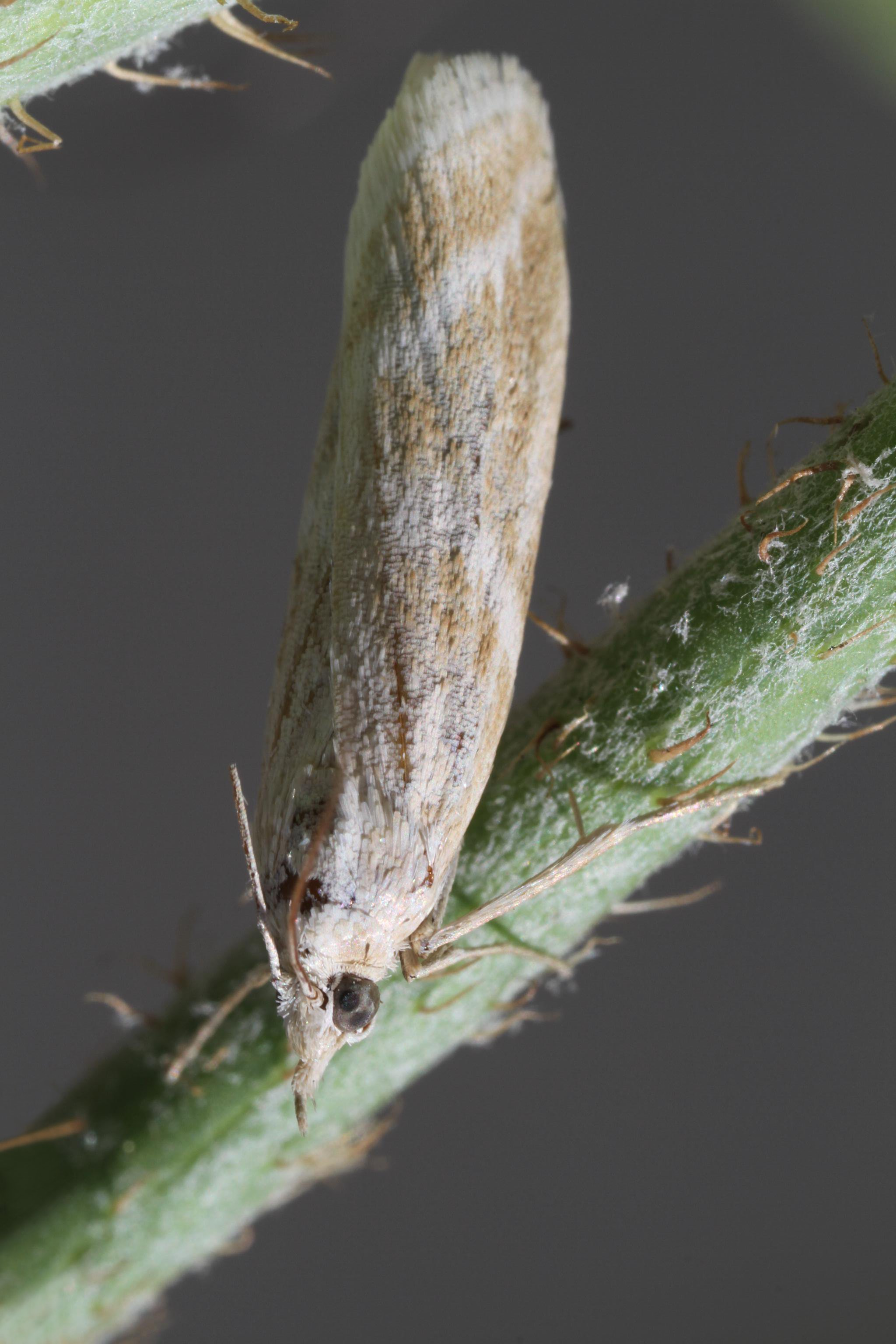

Scientific classification
- Domain: Eukaryota
- Kingdom: Animalia
- Phylum: Arthropoda
- Class: Insecta
- Order: Lepidoptera
- Family: Pyralidae
- Genus: Bradyrrhoa
- Species: B. gilveolella

Binomial name
- Bradyrrhoa gilveolella (Treitschke, 1833)

Synonyms
- Phycis gilveolella Treitschke, 1833

= Bradyrrhoa gilveolella =

Species of moth

Bradyrrhoa gilveolella is a species of moth of the family Pyralidae. It was described by Georg Friedrich Treitschke in 1833. It is found in Greece, Sicily, Albania, North Macedonia, Bulgaria, Romania, Turkey, southern Russia, from Kazakhstan to Ukraine and south to central Iran.

The wingspan is about 28 mm. Adults are on wing from May or June to September and again from late July or early September to May or June in overlapping generations.

The larvae feed on Chondrilla juncea. Larval development and pupation take place entirely beneath the soil surface within a feeding tube that is attached to the root of their host plant. The feeding tube is made of loosely spun silk. Later, it is covered with latex, root fragments, frass and soil particles. They feed on the outer cortical portion of the rootstock, cutting cortical vessels and interrupting the flow of nutrients. Pupation takes place within the feeding tube.

== Gallery ==
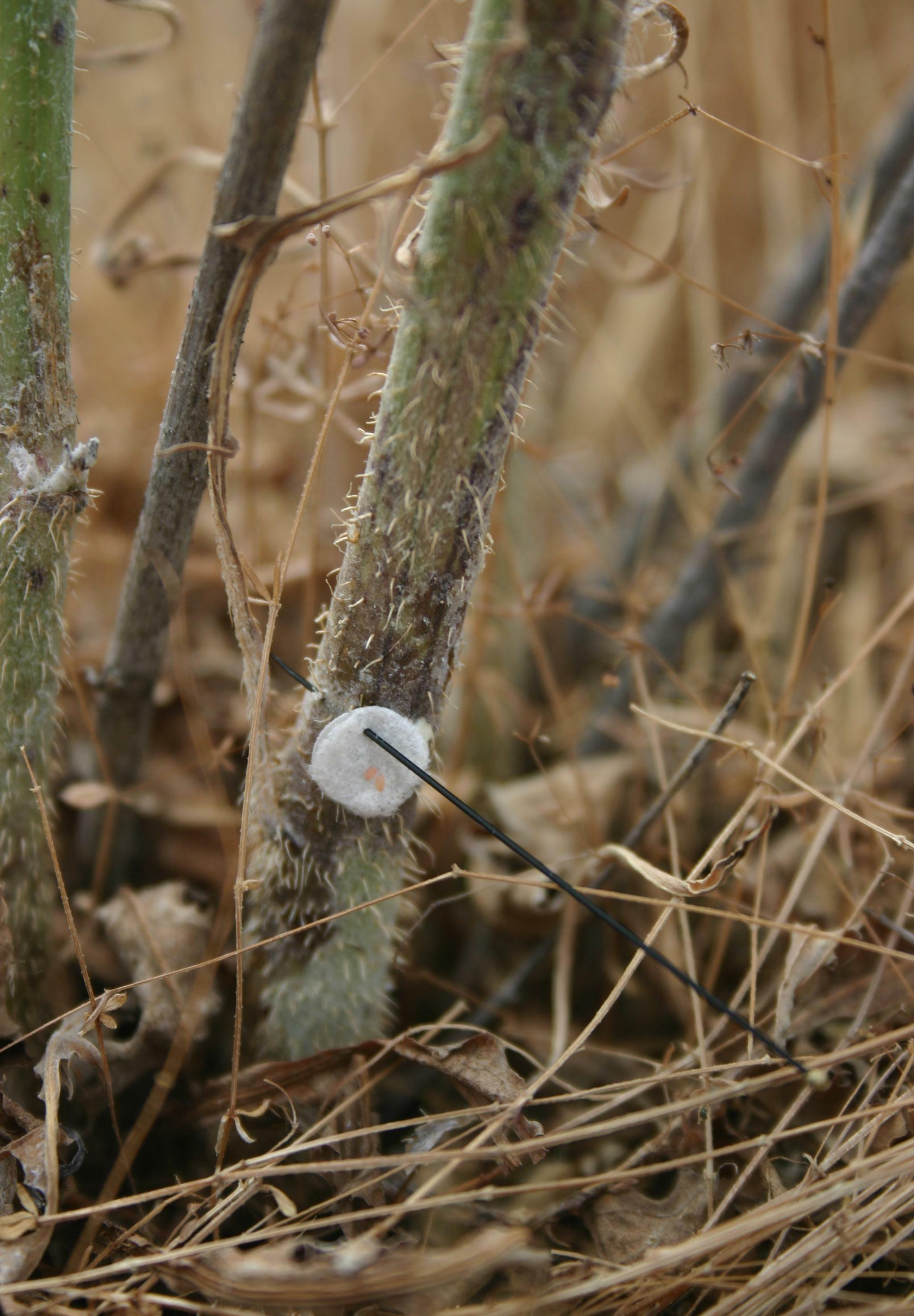
Egg

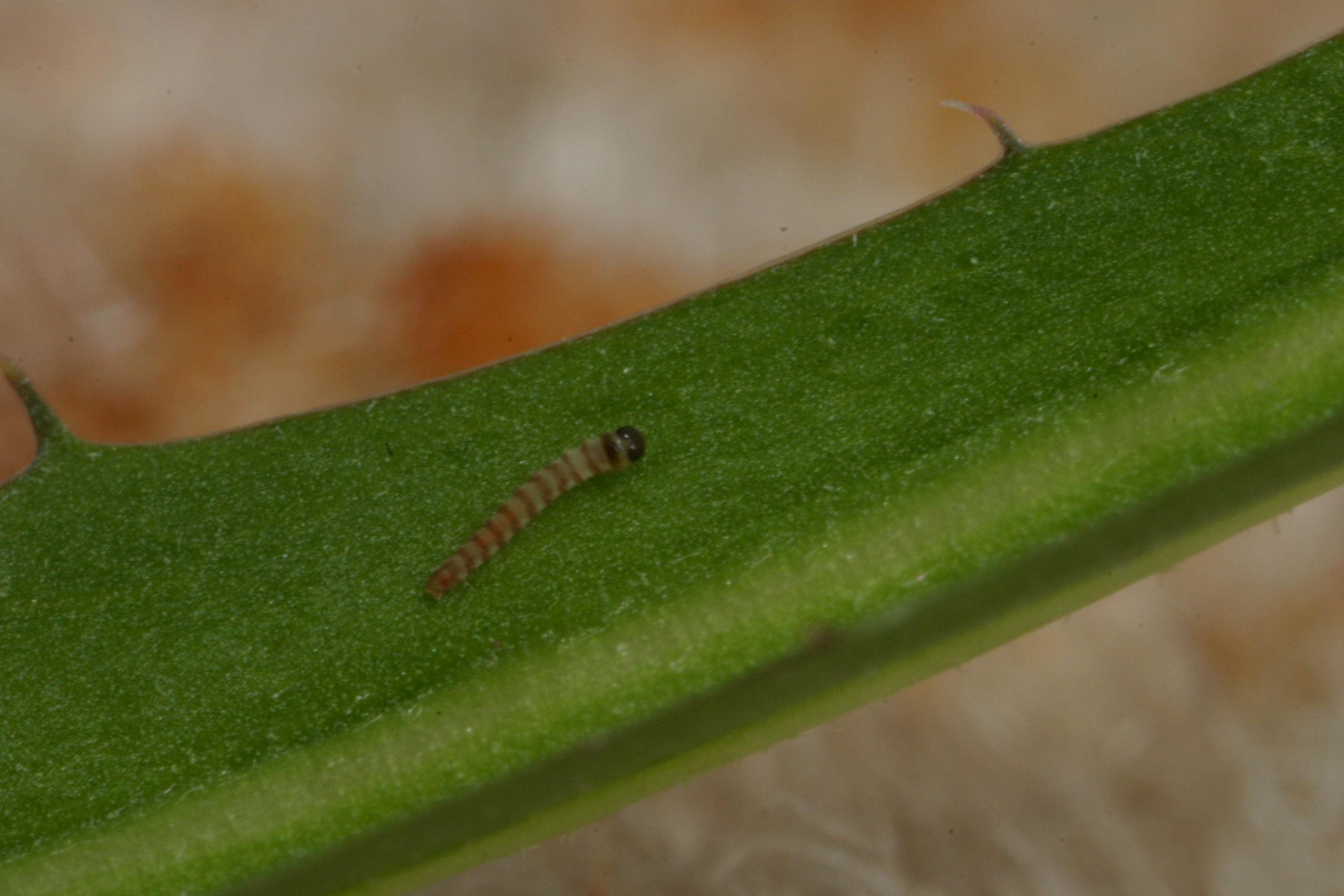
Larva
