= Phyllocoptes malinus =

Scientific classification
- Domain: Eukaryota
- Kingdom: Animalia
- Phylum: Arthropoda
- Subphylum: Chelicerata
- Class: Arachnida
- Family: Eriophyidae
- Genus: Phyllocoptes
- Species: P. malinus

Binomial name
- Phyllocoptes malinus (Nalepa, 1892)

Synonyms
- Cecidophyes malinus Nelepa, 1892

Species of mite

Phyllocoptes malinus, also known as the apple leaf mite, is a species of mite belonging to the genus Phyllocoptes. It causes a gall, which is a swelling on the external tissues, on the leaves of apples (Malus species). The mite is found in Europe and was first described by the Austrian zoologist Alfred Nalepa in 1892.

== Description of the gall ==
Sometimes mistaken for a fungal infection, various species of mite develop irregular rust-like erineum; the commonest is caused by the apple leaf mite. The mites live and feed amongst minute, globular or wooly hairs on either side of the leaf, during the summer. The erineum are whitish-pink or red at first, later becoming rust-brown. Purple leaved varieties of M. sylvestris are particularly colourful. Infected leaves may fall in the late summer but the mites do not have a serious effect on the host tree. During the winter the mites are dormant living in the buds or under loose bark. The apple leaf mite is monophagous on species of Malus, including apple (Malus domestica), Hall crab apple (Malus halliana), European crab apple (Malus sylvestris) and Malus x purpurea. In Britain the mite prefers crabapple and eating apple to cooking apples although Bramley's can have a heavy infestation.
