= Bradyrrhoa marianella =

Scientific classification
- Kingdom: Animalia
- Phylum: Arthropoda
- Clade: Pancrustacea
- Class: Insecta
- Order: Lepidoptera
- Family: Pyralidae
- Genus: Bradyrrhoa
- Species: B. marianella

Binomial name
- Bradyrrhoa marianella Ragonot, 1887

Synonyms
- Bradyrrhoa lyratella Chrétien, 1926

Species of moth

Bradyrrhoa marianella is a species of snout moth in the genus Bradyrrhoa. It was described by Ragonot in 1887, and is known from Pyrenees.

The wingspan is about 32 mm.
