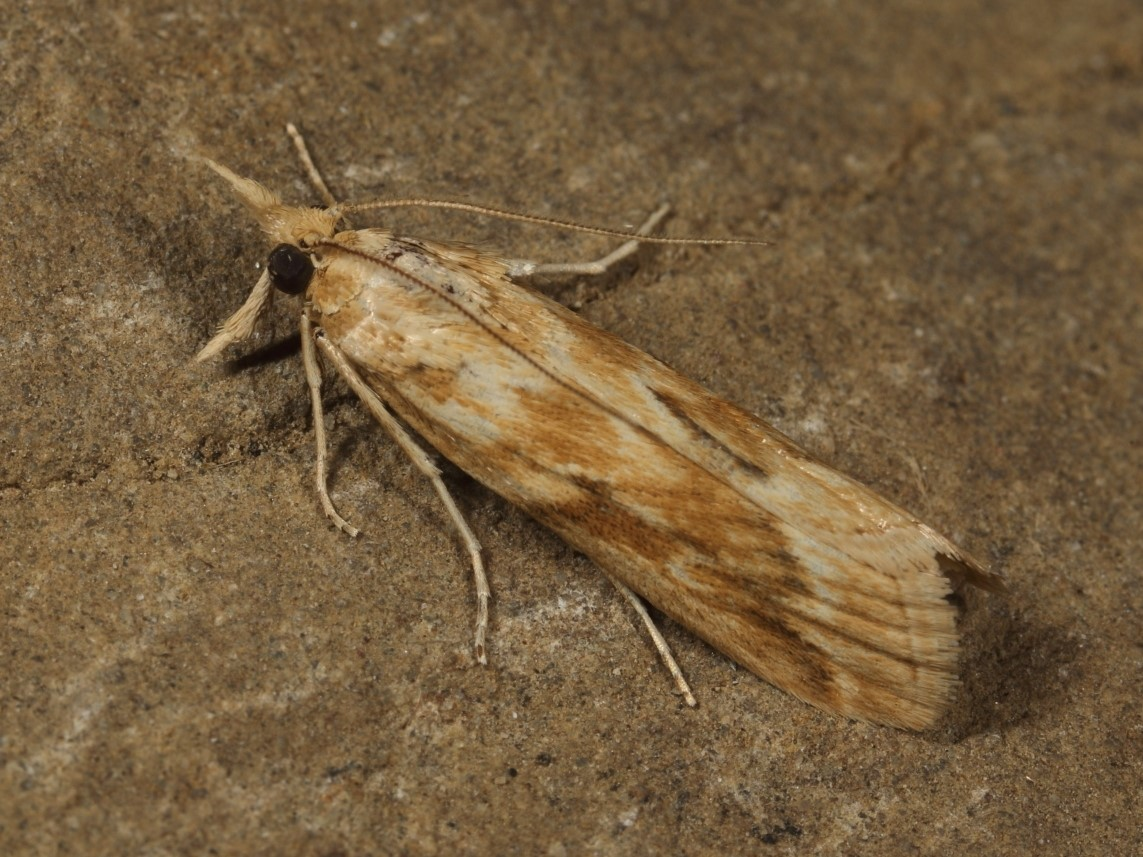

Scientific classification
- Kingdom: Animalia
- Phylum: Arthropoda
- Clade: Pancrustacea
- Class: Insecta
- Order: Lepidoptera
- Family: Pyralidae
- Genus: Bradyrrhoa
- Species: B. luteola

Binomial name
- Bradyrrhoa luteola (La Harpe, 1860)

Synonyms
- Zophodia luteola La Harpe, 1860

= Bradyrrhoa luteola =

Species of moth

Bradyrrhoa luteola is a species of snout moth in the family Pyralidae. It was first described by Jean Jacques Charles de La Harpe in 1860. It is found in Spain and on Sicily.
