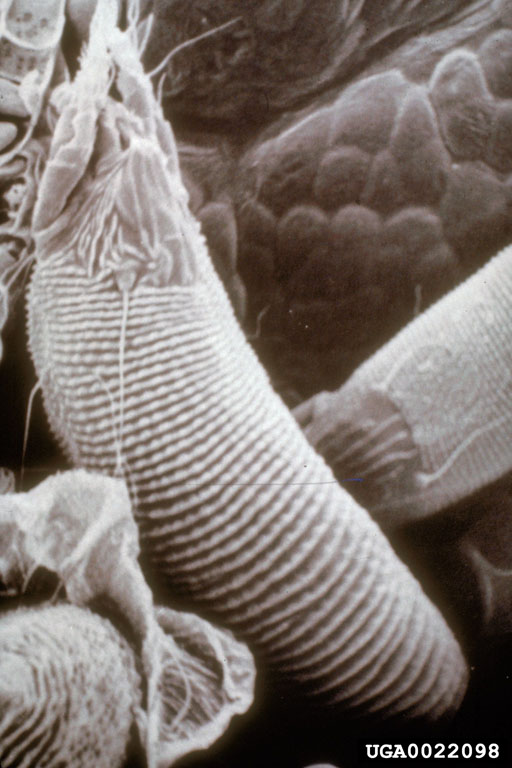
- Aceria chondrillae. Image by Charles Turner, USDA Agricultural Research Service, Bugwood.com

Scientific classification
- Kingdom: Animalia
- Phylum: Arthropoda
- Subphylum: Chelicerata
- Class: Arachnida
- Family: Eriophyidae
- Genus: Aceria
- Species: A. chondrillae

Binomial name
- Aceria chondrillae Canestrini, 1891

Synonyms
- Eriophyes chondrillae

= Aceria chondrillae =

Species of mite

Aceria chondrillae (chondrilla gall mite, skeletonweed gall mite) is a gall-forming deuterogynous eriophyid mite. It is often used as a biological control of the noxious weed Chondrilla juncea (rush skeletonweed), a highly competitive herbaceous perennial composite found in Europe, Asia, Australia and North America.

== Biological description ==
At maturity, mites are yellowish orange in colour, with females ranging from 0.19-0.26 mm in length with the males slightly smaller at, 0.165-0.180 mm. Except for genitalia male and female mites are externally similar. Larvae are smaller than the adults and distinguished by a humpback and exhibit no external genitalia. Eggs are soft, round, 0.04mm in diameter and at first colorless but later light orange. Mite growth and development is dependent on environmental and climatic conditions. A. chondrillae have an average generation cycle of 10 days.

== Impact on chondrilla ==
The chondrilla plant exhibits galls when infested by A. chondrillae. These galls appear as clusters of tiny, hyperplastic buds reaching a size of 1.5–2 cm in diameter, and in some cases up to 5 cm. Hundreds of mites can be contained within each gall.

The development of the galls impede the health, growth, and reproduction abilities of the plant by:

- destroying the flower buds in gall formation, reducing and suppressing seed production.
- compromising the apical shoots, resulting in a diminished regenerative capacity. Particularly efficacious in plants infested early, gall formations block shoot development on the apical growing points, stunting growth, distorting adjacent stems, associated foliage and in some cases causing death.
- weakening the plant through the presence and production of large galls. The plant often turns yellow early from premature decline.

A. chondrillae has been recognized to affect plants of the Chondrilla genus: C. juncea, C. juncea f. acantholepis, C. brevirostris and C. leiosperma.

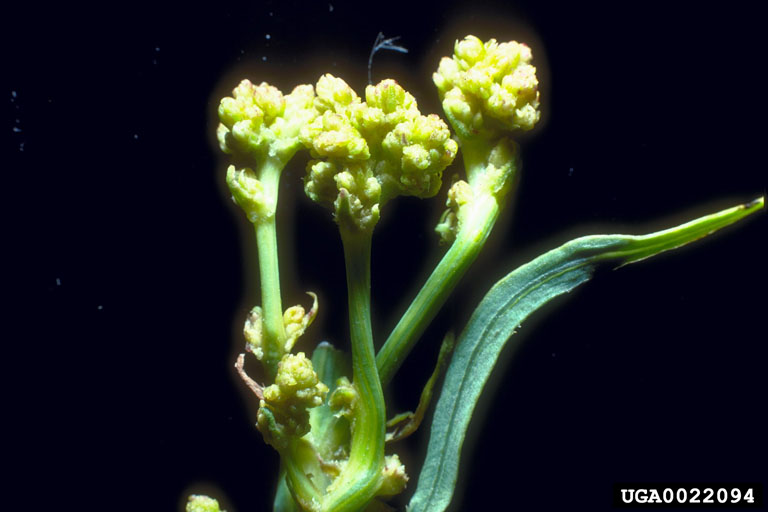
Galls from Eriophyes chondrillae on Chondrilla. Image by Gary L. Piper, Washington State University, Bugwood.com

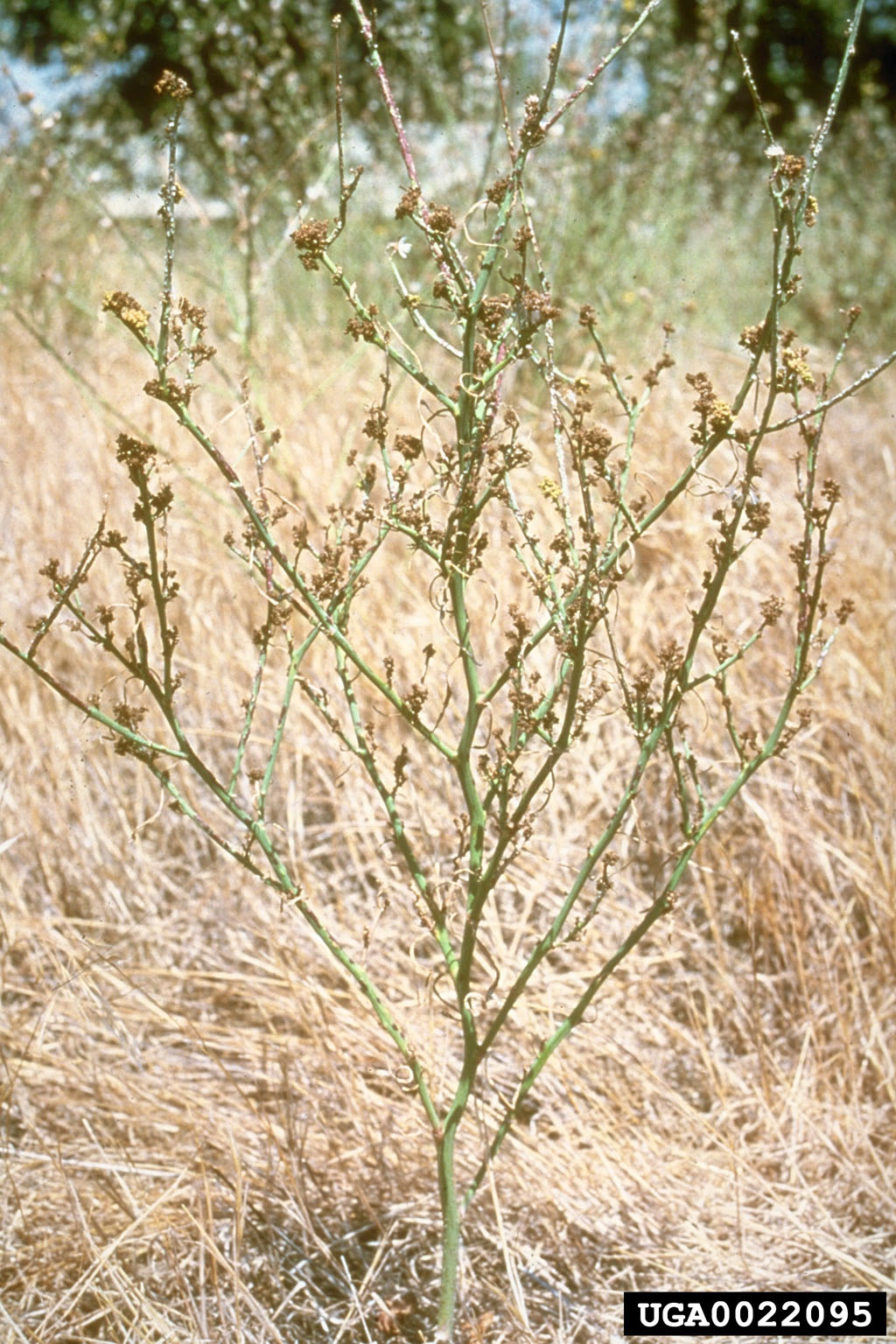
Chondrilla plant exhibiting galls from Eriophyes chondrillae. Image by Eric Coombs, Oregon Department of Agriculture, Bugwood.com

== Use as a biological control ==
Aceria chondrillae is often used as a biological control for the perennial herb skeleton weed (Chondrilla juncea) present in Europe, North America and Australia. It was introduced to Australia in 1971 as part of a program to suppress skeleton weed in areas where it dominates the landscape.

== Predators ==
Only one predator of the Chondrilla gall mite has been observed in nature. The Phytoseiid predatory mite, Amblyseius sp., lives in the galls made by Aceria chondrillae and exists in all Mediterranean areas where Aceria chondrillae has been found. Populations are small and have little effect on A. chondrillae numbers.
