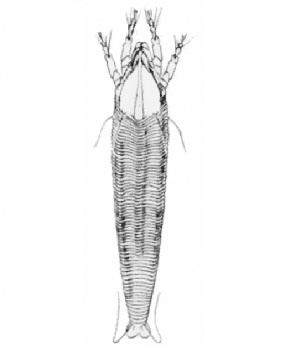
- Abacarus hystrix

Scientific classification
- Kingdom: Animalia
- Phylum: Arthropoda
- Subphylum: Chelicerata
- Class: Arachnida
- Order: Trombidiformes
- Family: Eriophyidae
- Genus: Abacarus; Keifer, 1944

= Abacarus =

Genus of mites

Abacarus is a genus of acari, including the following species:

- Abacarus acutatus Sukhareva, 1985
- Abacarus doctus Navia et al., 2011
- Abacarus hystrix Nalepa, 1896
- Abacarus lolii Skoracka, 2009
- Abacarus sacchari Channabasavanna, 1966
