= Acaphylla =

Scientific classification
- Domain: Eukaryota
- Kingdom: Animalia
- Phylum: Arthropoda
- Subphylum: Chelicerata
- Class: Arachnida
- Family: Eriophyidae
- Genus: Acaphylla; Keifer, 1943

Genus of mites

Acaphylla is a genus of mites belonging to the family Eriophyidae.

The species of this genus are found in Northern America.

Species:

- Acaphylla acromia (Nalepa, 1891)
- Acaphylla steinwedeni Keifer, 1943
- Acaphylla theae (Watt, 1898)
- Acaphylla theavagrans Kadono, 1992
