= Aberoptus =

Scientific classification
- Domain: Eukaryota
- Kingdom: Animalia
- Phylum: Arthropoda
- Subphylum: Chelicerata
- Class: Arachnida
- Family: Eriophyidae
- Genus: Aberoptus; Keifer, 1951

Genus of mites

Aberoptus is a genus of mites belonging to the family Eriophyidae. These tiny mites, flattened in shape, live beneath the waxy layer on the underside of the leaves of certain plants.

== Species ==
Species include:

- Aberoptus cerostructor Flechtmann, 2001
- Aberoptus championus Huang, 2005
- Aberoptus platessoides Smith-Meyer, 1989
- Aberoptus samoae Keifer, 1951
