= Bradyrrhoa cantenerella =

Scientific classification
- Domain: Eukaryota
- Kingdom: Animalia
- Phylum: Arthropoda
- Class: Insecta
- Order: Lepidoptera
- Family: Pyralidae
- Genus: Bradyrrhoa
- Species: B. cantenerella

Binomial name
- Bradyrrhoa cantenerella (Duponchel, [1837])

Synonyms
- Phycis cantenerella Duponchel, [1837]; Bradyrrhoa sardicolella Schawerda, 1936; Bradyrrhoa subflavella Ragonot, 1887; Staudingeria variegatella D. Lucas, 1948

Species of moth

Bradyrrhoa cantenerella is a species of snout moth in the genus Bradyrrhoa. It was described by Philogène Auguste Joseph Duponchel in 1837 and is known from Morocco and southern Europe.

The wingspan is 23–27 mm. Adults are on wing from May to September in one generation per year.
