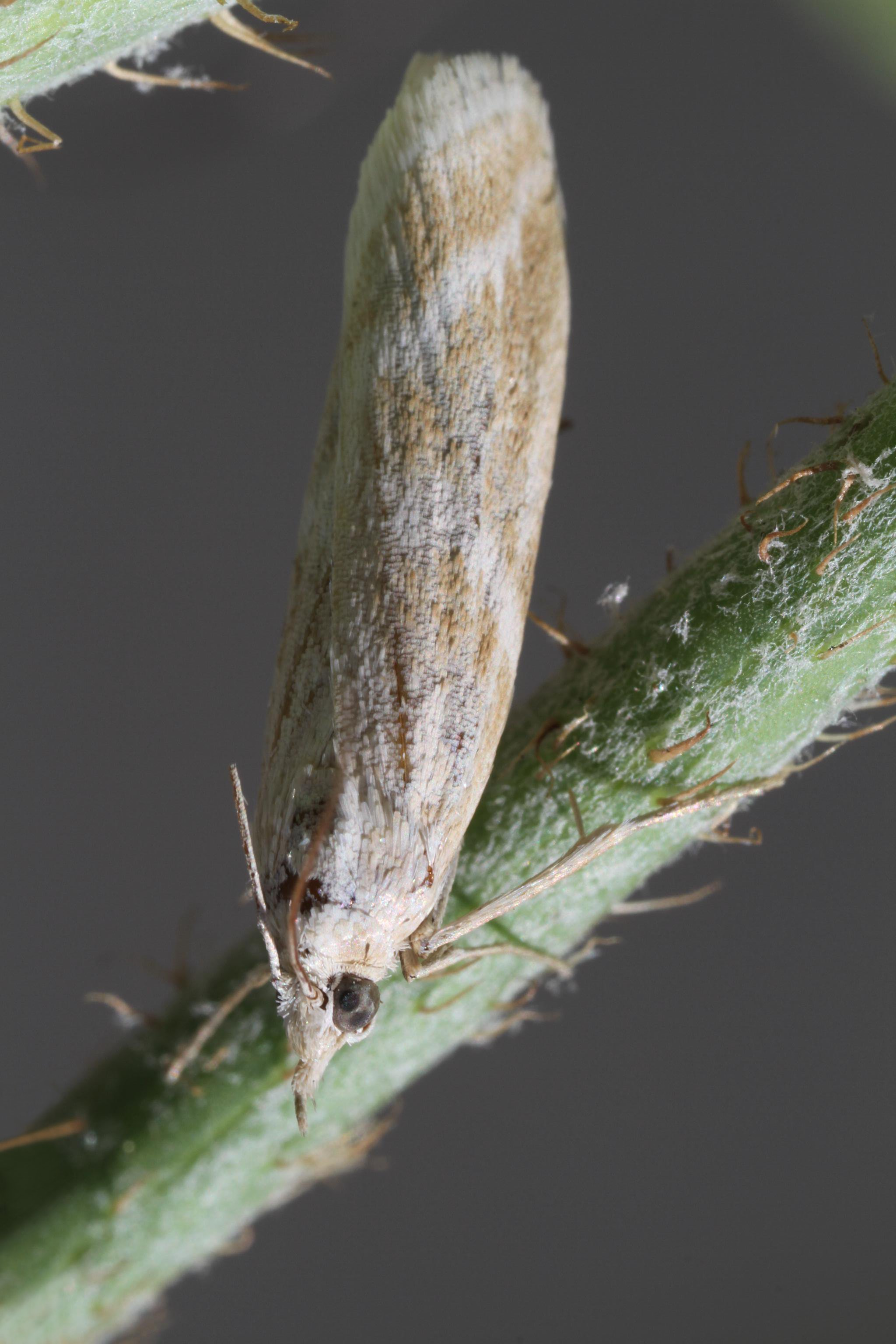
- Bradyrrhoa gilveolella

Scientific classification
- Kingdom: Animalia
- Phylum: Arthropoda
- Clade: Pancrustacea
- Class: Insecta
- Order: Lepidoptera
- Family: Pyralidae
- Subfamily: Phycitinae
- Tribe: Phycitini
- Genus: Bradyrrhoa; Zeller, 1848

Synonyms
- Bradyrhaea Marschall, 1873

= Bradyrrhoa =

Genus of moths

Bradyrrhoa is a genus of snout moths. It was described by Philipp Christoph Zeller in 1848.

== Species ==
- Bradyrrhoa adrianae Asselbergs, 2002
- Bradyrrhoa cantenerella (Duponchel, 1837)
- Bradyrrhoa confiniella Zeller, 1848
- Bradyrrhoa divaricella Ragonot, 1887
- Bradyrrhoa gilveolella (Treitschke, 1833)
- Bradyrrhoa luteola (La Harpe, 1860)
- Bradyrrhoa marianella Ragonot, 1887
- Bradyrrhoa trapezella (Duponchel, 1836)
