= Tegolophus =

Scientific classification
- Domain: Eukaryota
- Kingdom: Animalia
- Phylum: Arthropoda
- Subphylum: Chelicerata
- Class: Arachnida
- Family: Eriophyidae
- Genus: Tegolophus; Keifer, 1961

Genus of mites

Tegolophus is a genus of acari, including the following species:

- Tegolophus alicis Manson, 1984
- Tegolophus australis Keifer, 1964
- Tegolophus meliflorus Manson, 1984
- Tegolophus poriruensis Manson, 1984
