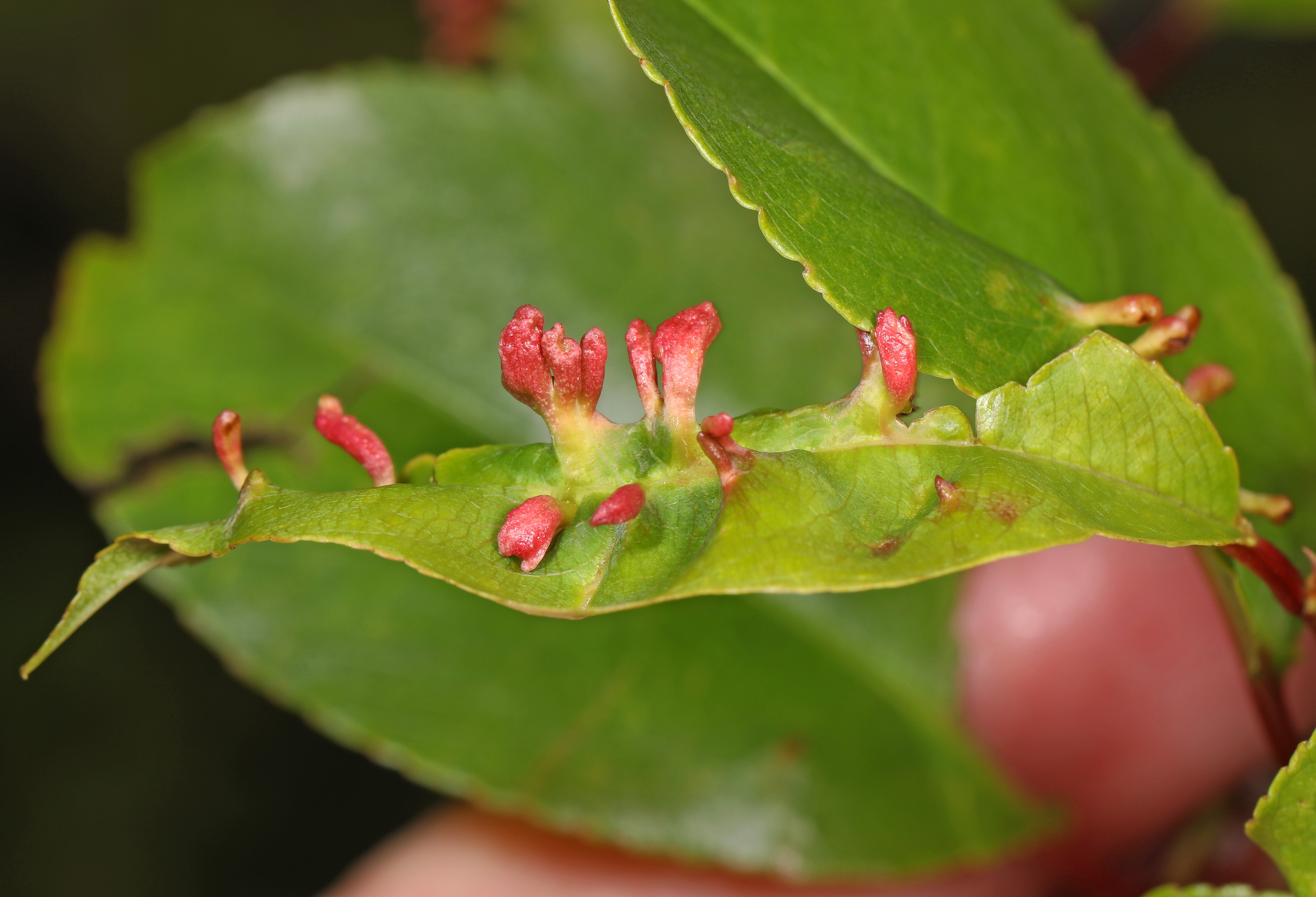

Scientific classification
- Kingdom: Animalia
- Phylum: Arthropoda
- Subphylum: Chelicerata
- Class: Arachnida
- Order: Trombidiformes
- Family: Eriophyidae
- Genus: Eriophyes
- Species: E. cerasicrumena

Binomial name
- Eriophyes cerasicrumena (Walsh, 1867)

Synonyms
- Phytoptus cerasicrumena

= Eriophyes cerasicrumena =

Species of mite

Eriophyes cerasicrumena, the black cherry leaf gall mite, is a species of gall mite in the family Eriophyidae. This species was formerly a member of the genus Phytoptus. They produce galls on black cherry plants. Caterpillars of cherry gall azure feed on these galls, and apparently also on the mites themselves.

== Description ==
Eriophyes cerasicrumena is a small mite that can only be described in detail through microscope work. The mites are vermiform and yellowish with palmate, five-rayed feather claws. Hysterosomas are covered in ventrally round and dorsally elongated microtubules. Overwintering females lack microtubules dorsally.

The galls produced by E. cerasicrumena are easily distinguishable from other gall mite species in form and choice of host plant. The elongated, spindle-shaped, pouchtype galls form on the upper surface of the leaves. Galls form to be about 4-8 mm long with a pointed tip and slender stock. While they form solitary, they tend to clump, especially around the midvein. The interior is yellowish green to brown to reddish.
