= Epitrimerus =

Scientific classification
- Kingdom: Animalia
- Phylum: Arthropoda
- Subphylum: Chelicerata
- Class: Arachnida
- Family: Eriophyidae
- Genus: Epitrimerus; Nalepa, 1898

Genus of mites

Epitrimerus is a genus of small mites. The genus was erected by the Austrian zoologist Alfred Nalepa in 1898.

== Species ==
- Epitrimerus abietis
- Epitrimerus acutiformis
- Epitrimerus aegopodii
- Epitrimerus alinae
- Epitrimerus amomi
- Epitrimerus anthrisci
- Epitrimerus asperulae
- Epitrimerus bidensi
- Epitrimerus boczeki
- Epitrimerus bupleurispinosi
- Epitrimerus callicarpae
- Epitrimerus campanularius
- Epitrimerus cardui
- Epitrimerus carexis
- Epitrimerus carmonae
- Epitrimerus chaerophylli
- Epitrimerus chamaenerii
- Epitrimerus convallariae
- Epitrimerus cotini
- Epitrimerus crassus
- Epitrimerus cupressi
- Epitrimerus dimocarpi
- Epitrimerus eriophori
- Epitrimerus eupatorii
- Epitrimerus fagi
- Epitrimerus farinosus
- Epitrimerus femoralis
- Epitrimerus filipendulae
- Epitrimerus flammulae
- Epitrimerus gemmicolus
- Epitrimerus gentianae
- Epitrimerus geranii
- Epitrimerus gibbosus
- Epitrimerus goodenowii
- Epitrimerus heraclei
- Epitrimerus hexapetalae
- Epitrimerus hieracii
- Epitrimerus hypochoerisi
- Epitrimerus insons
- Epitrimerus inulae
- Epitrimerus jaceae
- Epitrimerus knautiae
- Epitrimerus lirol
- Epitrimerus longitarsus
- Epitrimerus lythri
- Epitrimerus malimarginemtorquens
- Epitrimerus marginemtorquens
- Epitrimerus oculusinulae
- Epitrimerus perplexus
- Epitrimerus phaseoli
- Epitrimerus pinus
- Epitrimerus pratensis
- Epitrimerus protrichus
- Epitrimerus pungiscus
- Epitrimerus pyri (Nalepa)
- Epitrimerus pyrifoliae
- Epitrimerus pyrolae
- Epitrimerus ranunculi
- Epitrimerus rhyncothrix
- Epitrimerus rivalis
- Epitrimerus roivaineni
- Epitrimerus rotai
- Epitrimerus rubi
- Epitrimerus rumicis
- Epitrimerus silenesnutantis
- Epitrimerus spiraeae
- Epitrimerus steveni
- Epitrimerus subacromius
- Epitrimerus succisae
- Epitrimerus tanaceti
- Epitrimerus taxifoliae
- Epitrimerus taxodii
- Epitrimerus trilobus
- Epitrimerus umbonis
- Epitrimerus urbanus
- Epitrimerus urticae
- Epitrimerus venustus
- Epitrimerus vicinus
- Epitrimerus violarius
