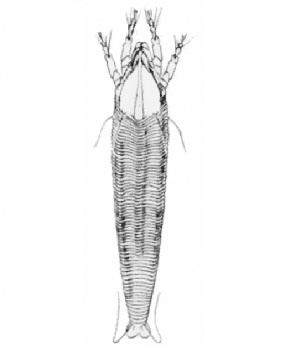

Scientific classification
- Domain: Eukaryota
- Kingdom: Animalia
- Phylum: Arthropoda
- Subphylum: Chelicerata
- Class: Arachnida
- Family: Eriophyidae
- Genus: Abacarus
- Species: A. sacchari

Binomial name
- Abacarus sacchari Channabasavanna, 1966

Synonyms
- Abacarus fujianensis Xin & Ding, 1982; Abacarus officinari Keifer, 1975

= Abacarus sacchari =

Species of mite

Abacarus sacchari, also known as the sugarcane rust mite, is an agricultural pest mite found mostly on sugarcane plantations in Africa, Brazil, India, Guatemala, Costa Rica, Venezuela, and southern Florida.

== Description ==
Although it had been known about for decades prior to its discovery, though many specifics about the pathogen were unknown, the sugarcane rust mite was first discovered in the Everglades Agricultural Area, Florida, in 1982 and was rediscovered in 2007. The length of time until rediscovery may have been due to the mite's microscopic size, which made it easily confused with other diseases. It was also found in West Bengal, mostly affecting untreated plants in early August. Unconfirmed reports of the mite have been made in Australia as well.

The onset of the mite is first visible in April, and it reaches its peak in August or September. When a plant is infected, it loses its green coloring and starts to obtain reddish-brown specks on the sugarcane leaf's primary vein. This is due to the mite's attack on the sugarcane's chlorophyll, as well as interfering with the sugarcane's photosynthesis, transpiration, and amount of stomatal conductance. The mites then continue to multiply on the plant's leaves. The severity of the mite's infection depends on the species of sugarcane it is infecting. The effect of it has been confused with the Pokka Boeng fungus.

Because sugarcane plantations are often burned to make room for the next harvest, the rust mite must spread over long distances to ensure its survival. To move long distances, it relies on wind, although where the mites land is often dictated by chance. Out of the amount of mites found airborne, most were female.
