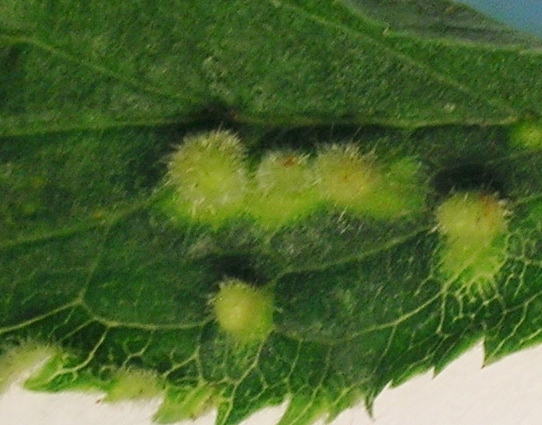
- Eriophyes padi (Nalepa) upper epidermis.

Scientific classification
- Kingdom: Animalia
- Phylum: Arthropoda
- Subphylum: Chelicerata
- Class: Arachnida
- Family: Eriophyidae
- Subfamily: Phyllocoptinae
- Tribe: Phyllocoptini
- Genus: Phyllocoptes; Nalepa, 1887

Diversity
- >15 species

= Phyllocoptes =

Genus of mites

Phyllocoptes is a genus of gall mites.

== Species ==
Genus Phyllocoptes consists of at least 15 species:

- Phyllocoptes abaenus Keifer, 1940
- Phyllocoptes adalius Keifer, 1939
- Phyllocoptes alniborealis Liro, 1950
- Phyllocoptes alniincanae Roivainen, 1947
- Phyllocoptes amaranthi Corti, 1917
- Phyllocoptes amygdali Bagdasarian, 1972
- Phyllocoptes atragenes Liro, 1941
- Phyllocoptes azaleae Nalepa, 1904
- Phyllocoptes coprosmae Lamb, 1952
- Phyllocoptes eupadi Newkirk 1984
- Phyllocoptes fructiphilus Keifer — causes rose rosette disease
- Phyllocoptes goniothorax (Nalepa) — causes galls on Crataegus species
- Phyllocoptes hazelae Manson, 1984
- Phyllocoptes malinus (Nalepa, 1892) — causes galls on Malus species
- Phyllocoptes metrosideri Manson, 1989
- Phyllocoptes populi (Nalepa)
