= Bradyrrhoa divaricella =

Scientific classification
- Domain: Eukaryota
- Kingdom: Animalia
- Phylum: Arthropoda
- Class: Insecta
- Order: Lepidoptera
- Family: Pyralidae
- Genus: Bradyrrhoa
- Species: B. divaricella

Binomial name
- Bradyrrhoa divaricella Ragonot, 1887

Species of moth

Bradyrrhoa divaricella is a species of snout moth in the genus Bradyrrhoa. It was described by Émile Louis Ragonot in 1887, and is known from Uzbekistan.
