= Tetra (mite) =

Scientific classification
- Kingdom: Animalia
- Phylum: Arthropoda
- Subphylum: Chelicerata
- Class: Arachnida
- Order: Trombidiformes
- Suborder: Prostigmata
- Infraorder: Eupodina
- Superfamily: Eriophyoidea
- Family: Eriophyidae
- Genus: Tetra; Keifer, 1944

Genus of mite

Tetra is a genus of acariform mite. Tetra is part of the family Eriophyidae.

The genus comprises at least 66 described species.
