= Bradyrrhoa adrianae =

Scientific classification
- Domain: Eukaryota
- Kingdom: Animalia
- Phylum: Arthropoda
- Class: Insecta
- Order: Lepidoptera
- Family: Pyralidae
- Genus: Bradyrrhoa
- Species: B. adrianae

Binomial name
- Bradyrrhoa adrianae Asselbergs, 2002

Species of moth

Bradyrrhoa adrianae is a species of snout moth in the genus Bradyrrhoa. It was described by Jan Asselbergs in 2002 and is known from Spain.
