= Bradyrrhoa confiniella =

Scientific classification
- Kingdom: Animalia
- Phylum: Arthropoda
- Clade: Pancrustacea
- Class: Insecta
- Order: Lepidoptera
- Family: Pyralidae
- Genus: Bradyrrhoa
- Species: B. confiniella

Binomial name
- Bradyrrhoa confiniella Zeller, 1848

Synonyms
- Bradyrrhoa confiniella ebertella Roesler, 1969; Megasis nubigerella Ragonot, 1887

Species of moth

Bradyrrhoa confiniella is a species of snout moth in the genus Bradyrrhoa. It was described by Zeller in 1848 and is known from Crete, Greece, Albania, North Macedonia, Bulgaria, Croatia, Italy, Sicily and Corsica.
