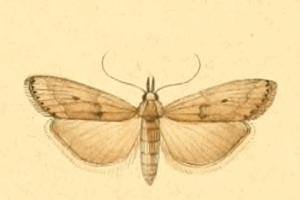

Scientific classification
- Domain: Eukaryota
- Kingdom: Animalia
- Phylum: Arthropoda
- Class: Insecta
- Order: Lepidoptera
- Family: Pyralidae
- Genus: Bradyrrhoa
- Species: B. trapezella

Binomial name
- Bradyrrhoa trapezella (Duponchel, 1837)

Synonyms
- Phycis trapezella Duponchel, 1837; Eucarphia seniella Staudinger, 1879; Bradyrrhoa trapezella ochrospilella Rebel, 1892; Phycis cinerella Duponchel, 1837

= Bradyrrhoa trapezella =

Species of moth

Bradyrrhoa trapezella is a species of snout moth in the genus Bradyrrhoa. It was described by Philogène Auguste Joseph Duponchel in 1837 and is known from the Canary Islands, Italy, France, Croatia, North Macedonia and Turkey.
