= Cecidophyopsis =

Scientific classification
- Kingdom: Animalia
- Phylum: Arthropoda
- Subphylum: Chelicerata
- Class: Arachnida
- Order: Trombidiformes
- Family: Eriophyidae
- Genus: Cecidophyopsis; Keifer, 1959

Genus of mites

Cecidophyopsis is a genus of mites belonging to the family Eriophyidae.

Species of this genus are found primarily in Europe. Species:

- Cecidophyopsis alpina Amrine, 1994
- Cecidophyopsis atrichus (Nalepa, 1892)
- Cecidophyopsis aurea Amrine, 1994
- Cecidophyopsis betulae (Nalepa, 1891)
- Cecidophyopsis championus Huang, 2001
- Cecidophyopsis entrotrombidium Kramer
- Cecidophyopsis grossulariae (Collinge, 1907)
- Cecidophyopsis hendersoni (Keifer, 1954)
- Cecidophyopsis malpighianus (Canestrini & Massalongo, 1893)
- Cecidophyopsis persicae Kuang & Luo, 1992
- Cecidophyopsis psilaspis (Nalepa, 1893) (yew bud mite)
- Cecidophyopsis pulchellus (Nalepa, 1914)
- Cecidophyopsis ribis (Westwood, 1869)
- Cecidophyopsis ruebsaameni (Nalepa, 1895)
- Cecidophyopsis selachodon van Eyndhoven, 1967
- Cecidophyopsis spicata Jones, 1997
- Cecidophyopsis verilicis
- Cecidophyopsis vermiformis (Nalepa, 1889)
