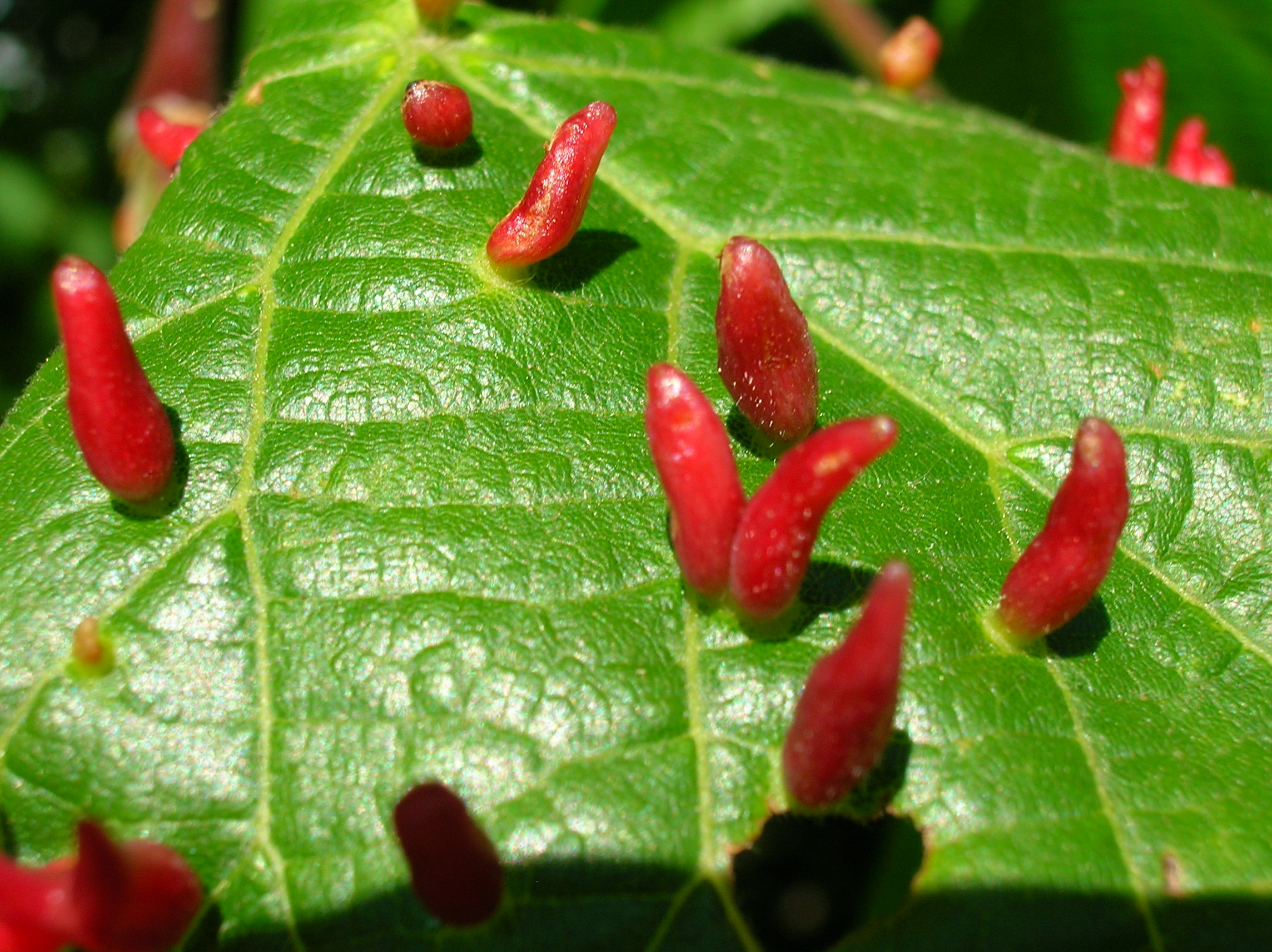
- Lime nail galls caused by Eriophyes tiliae

Scientific classification
- Kingdom: Animalia
- Phylum: Arthropoda
- Subphylum: Chelicerata
- Class: Arachnida
- Family: Eriophyidae
- Genus: Eriophyes von Siebold, 1851

Species
- See text

= Eriophyes =

Genus of mites

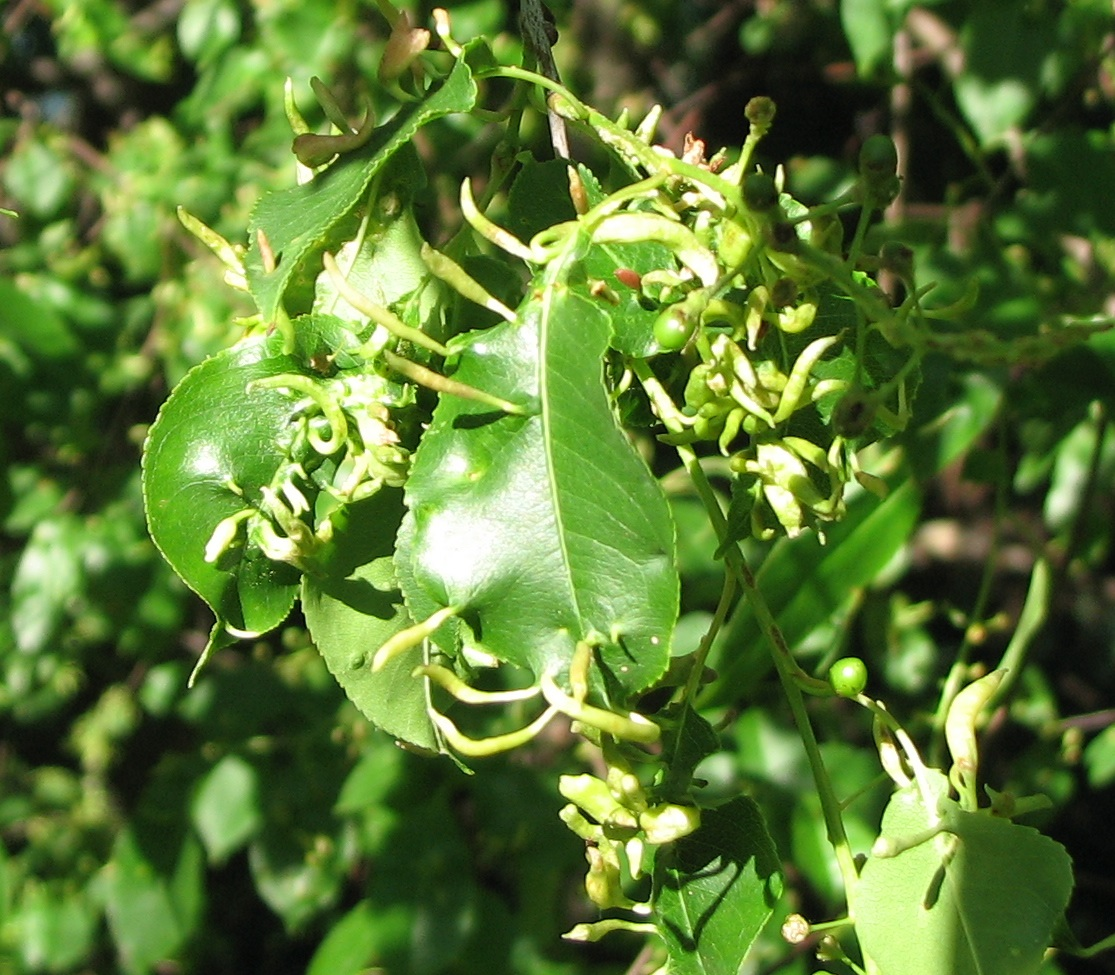
Eriophyes cerasicrumena on cherry

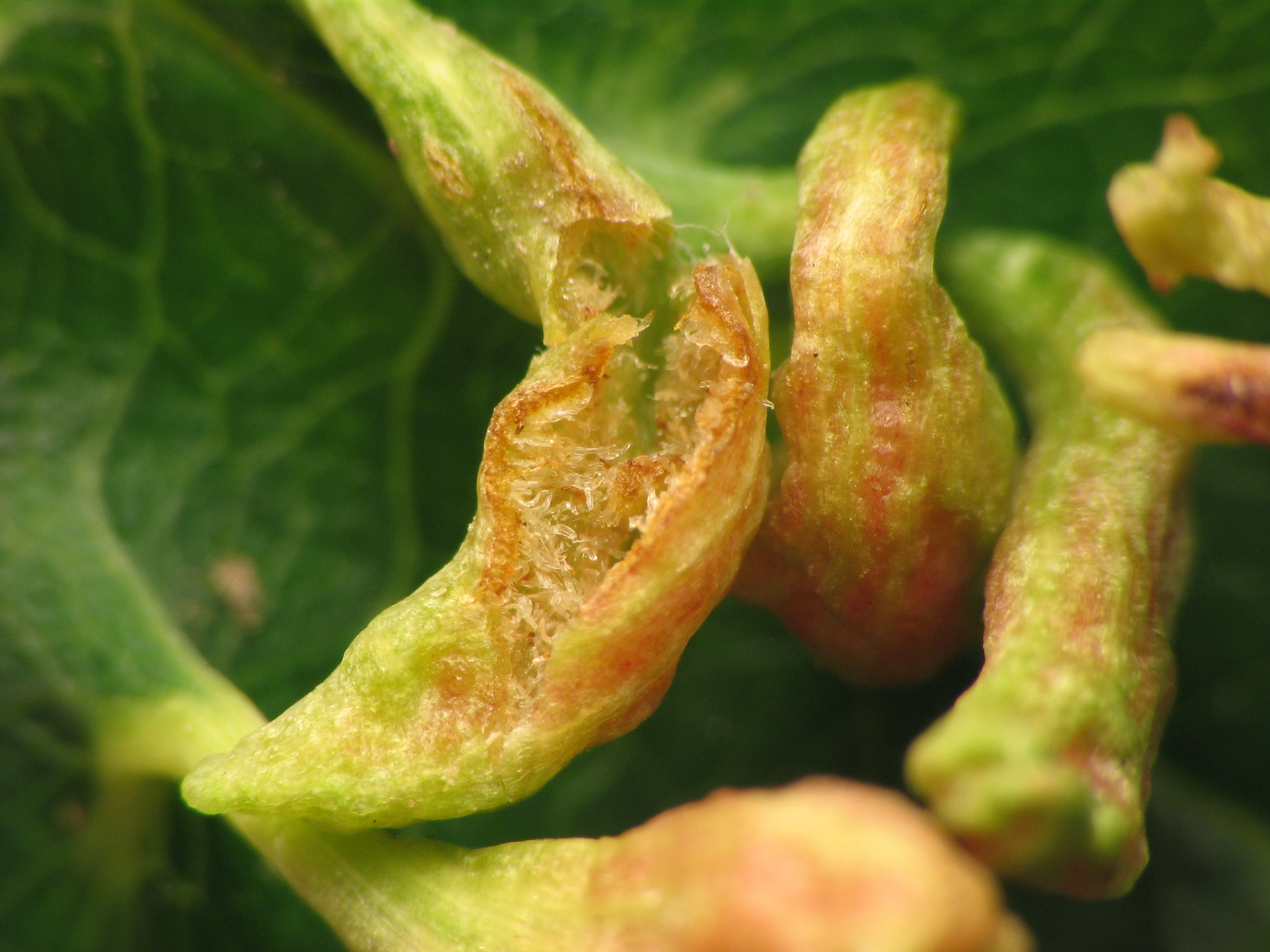
Eriophyes cerasicrumena, closeup

Eriophyes is a genus of mites that induce gall formation, mainly on the leaves of deciduous plants. Some are called blister mites. The blue butterfly Celastrina serotina has been reported to feed on these galls and also on the mites, making it one of the uncommon carnivorous Lepidoptera.

Whereas other mites have four paired legs, Eriophyes have only two. They feed by piercing plant cells to access the nutritious juices inside. While their saliva is known for creating recognizable, colorful galls, an Eriophyes infestation can also create other symptoms like brittleness or irregular blisters.

== Species ==
Species include:

- Eriophyes aceris
- Eriophyes alniincanae Nalepa, 1919
- Eriophyes amelancheus Nalepa, 1926
- Eriophyes arianus (Canestrini 1890)
- Eriophyes betulae
- Eriophyes betulinus
- Eriophyes bucidae
- Eriophyes buxi
- Eriophyes calcercis, purple erineum maple mite
- Eriophyes calophylli
- Eriophyes calycophthirus
- Eriophyes canestrini
- Eriophyes canestrinii
- Eriophyes cerasicrumena, black cherry finger gall mite
- Eriophyes crataegi
- Eriophyes cupulariae
- Eriophyes dentatae
- Eriophyes dimocarpi, longan gall mite
- Eriophyes diversipunctatus
- Eriophyes emarginatae
- Eriophyes epimedii
- Eriophyes euphorbiae
- Eriophyes exilis
- Eriophyes genistae
- Eriophyes goniothorax
- Eriophyes gossypii, cotton blister mite
- Eriophyes inangulis
- Eriophyes helicantyx
- Eriophyes kuko
- Eriophyes laevis
- Eriophyes lateannulatus
- Eriophyes leionotus
- Eriophyes leiosoma (Nalepa, 1892)
- Eriophyes lentiginosus
- Eriophyes litchii, lychee erinose mite or litchi rust mite
- Eriophyes macrorhynchus (Nalepa, 1889), sycamore gall mite
- Eriophyes mali, appleleaf Blistergalls
- Eriophyes melaleucae
- Eriophyes menthae
- Eriophyes neoessegi, cottonwood catkingall mite
- Eriophyes oleae
- Eriophyes oxycedri
- Eriophyes padi
- Eriophyes parapopuli, poplar budgall mite
- Eriophyes paraspiraeae
- Eriophyes parulmi, elm fingergall mite
- Eriophyes pilifex
- Eriophyes populi, eriophyid mite
- Eriophyes propinquus
- Eriophyes prunispinosae
- Eriophyes pseudoinsidiosus
- Eriophyes pyri, pearleaf blister mite
- Eriophyes rubicolens
- Eriophyes similis
- Eriophyes sorbi
- Eriophyes tiliae (Pagenstecher 1857), eriophyid mite
- Eriophyes totarae Manson, 1984
- Eriophyes triradiatus, eriophyid mite
- Eriophyes tristriatus
- Eriophyes tulipae, wheat curl mite
- Eriophyes viburni
- Eriophyes vitis
- Eriophyes von
