= Eriophyes padi =

Scientific classification
- Domain: Eukaryota
- Kingdom: Animalia
- Phylum: Arthropoda
- Subphylum: Chelicerata
- Class: Arachnida
- Family: Eriophyidae
- Genus: Eriophyes
- Species: E. padi

Binomial name
- Eriophyes padi Nalepa, 1890

Species of mite

Eriophyes padi is a gall-forming mite that causes cherry pouch galls on black cherry trees. Eriophyes padi belongs to the genus Eriophyes and the family Eriophyidae. It lives in Europe and Russia
