= Hystrix (diatom) =

Scientific classification
- Domain: Eukaryota
- Clade: Diaphoretickes
- Clade: SAR
- Clade: Stramenopiles
- Phylum: Gyrista
- Subphylum: Ochrophytina
- Class: Bacillariophyceae
- Order: incertae sedis
- Genus: Hystrix; J.B.M. Bory de Saint-Vincent, 1822

Genus of diatom

Hystrix is a genus of diatoms.
