= Hystrix =

Hystrix may refer to:

- Ichthyosis hystrix, a class of rare skin disorder characterized by massive hyperkeratosis with an appearance like spiny scales

== Biology ==
- Hystrix (diatom) Bory de Saint-Vincent 1822, a diatom genus
- Hystrix (plant) Moench 1794, a plant genus in the family Poaceae
- Hystrix (mammal), a rodent genus

== Computing ==
- a library to implement the bulkhead pattern from Netflix, see Hystrix
