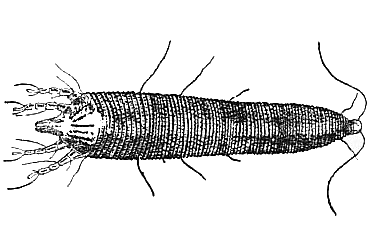

Scientific classification
- Domain: Eukaryota
- Kingdom: Animalia
- Phylum: Arthropoda
- Subphylum: Chelicerata
- Class: Arachnida
- Family: Eriophyidae
- Genus: Cecidophyopsis
- Species: C. ribis

Binomial name
- Cecidophyopsis ribis (Westwood), 1869

= Cecidophyopsis ribis =

Species of mite

Cecidophyopsis ribis is an eriophyid mite which is best known for being a plant parasite, a pest of Ribes species, the genus that includes gooseberries and blackcurrants. It is commonly known as the blackcurrant gall mite or big bud mite. It feeds on the plants' buds, forming galls, and transmits a virus which causes blackcurrant reversion disease. The mite is a serious pest of blackcurrant crops in Europe, but rarely on other continents.

== Biology ==
Buds affected by Cecidophyopsis ribis become swollen and globular and fail to develop normally. They are first noticeable in the autumn when they are unpointed and twice as large as normal buds. Inside the bud, between the closely folded leaves, are thousands of small, spherical eggs which later hatch into sausage-shaped mites with short legs near their anterior end. The mites suck sap from the buds and while they are doing so, can transmit the virus that causes blackcurrant reversion disease. The mites are 0.25 mm (0.01 in) long. When mature they move out of the buds onto the twigs where they make their way to uninfested buds or may feed on the foliage later in the season causing distortion of the leaves. Crop yields are reduced as a result of the damage they do. The mites are so tiny that they can easily be blown or splashed onto other bushes or carried inadvertently by flying insects. They breed during the summer and autumn, laying their eggs inside new buds. They can also infest the buds of gooseberries, whitecurrants or redcurrants, but in these the affected buds die and "big bud" symptoms do not develop. These alternative host fruit bushes are not susceptible to blackcurrant reversion disease.

== Blackcurrant reversion disease ==
The virus causing blackcurrant reversion is transmitted by Cecidophyopsis ribis. The characteristic leaf symptoms are a smaller number of leaf lobes and a decrease in the number of teeth on the serrated edge of the leaves. The flowers also show symptoms, with the buds being less hairy than normal and, in a severe form of the disease present in Russia and Scandinavia, the sepals appearing to be doubled in number to ten. The vigor of the bush is reduced, and fruit yields diminish. Although spread of the mite can be prevented to some extent, badly affected bushes should be destroyed and replaced with virus-free stock.

Until 2019 the virus was found everywhere blackcurrants grew except North America and Australia. However, in 2019 it was detected for the first time in Oregon, United States. Although these mites are the only known vector, the mites themselves have not been found. It is unknown whether something else is vectoring the pathogen or if this evidences another transmission route is working in this area.

== Distribution ==
Cecidophyopsis ribis is found mainly in Europe and Asia, but has also reached New Zealand. It is not found in North America or Australia and quarantine restrictions apply to the import of susceptible plants.
