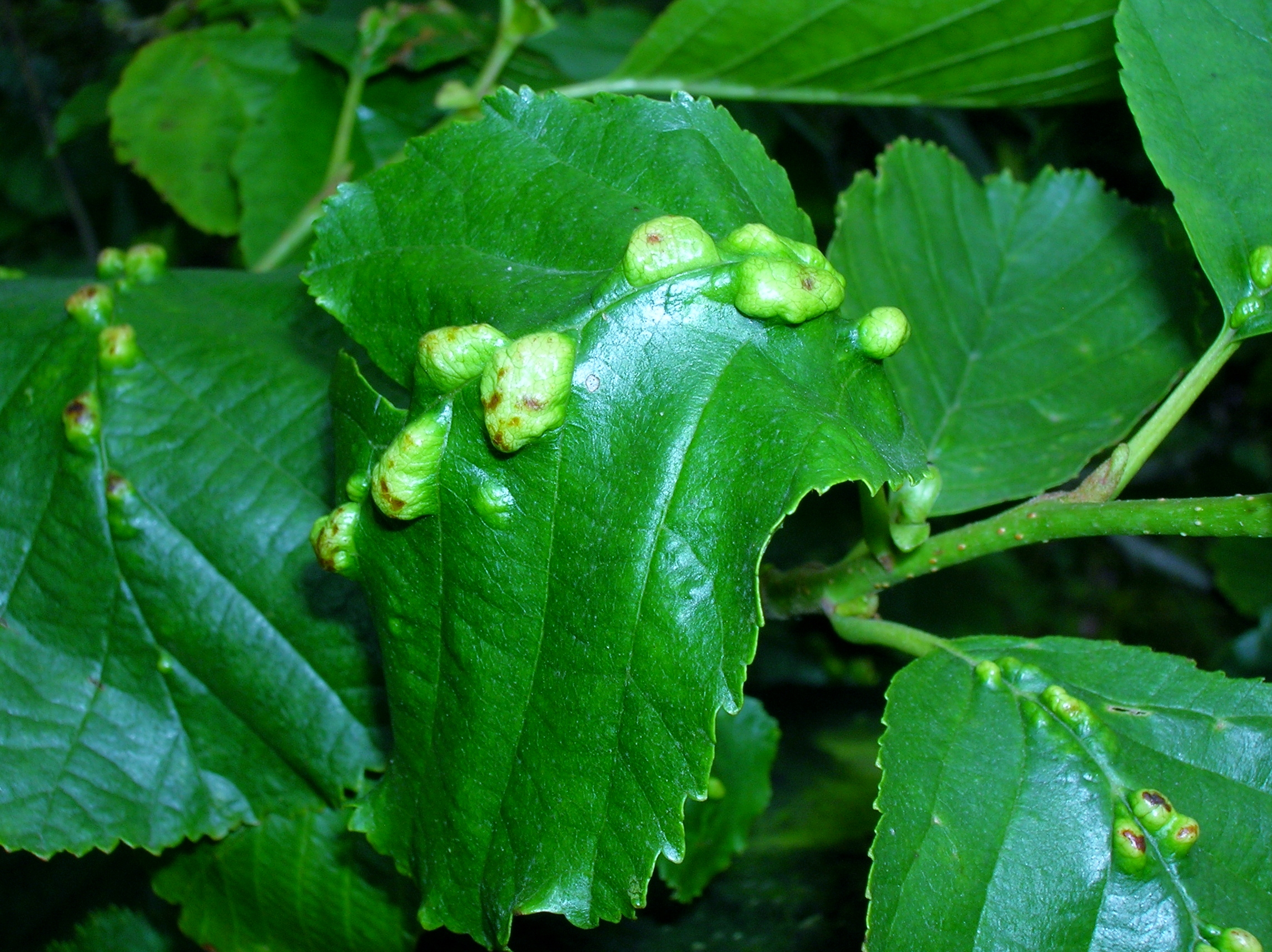
- Mature midrib galls on an alder leaf

Scientific classification
- Kingdom: Animalia
- Phylum: Arthropoda
- Subphylum: Chelicerata
- Class: Arachnida
- Family: Eriophyidae
- Genus: Eriophyes
- Species: E. inangulis

Binomial name
- Eriophyes inangulis Nalepa, 1919

= Eriophyes inangulis =

Species of mite

Eriophyes inangulis is a mite that forms the alder vein angle gall. It develops in a chemically induced gall; a sub-spherical distortion rising up from the upper surface of the leaves of alder trees Alnus glutinosa along the midrib. Synonyms are Eriophyes laevis inangulis, Phytoptus laevis, and Cephaloneon pustulatum.

== The physical appearance ==
The gall's appearance on the upper surface is sub-spherical, smooth and may vary in colour from pale yellow-green to deep red. The adult mite lives on alder tree sap, sucked from the cell tissues. The galls cluster along the midrib in the angle of the veins. The wide opening and interior on the lower epidermis and is lined with large numbers of small hairs. Galls may be so numerous that the leaf expansion is inhibited.

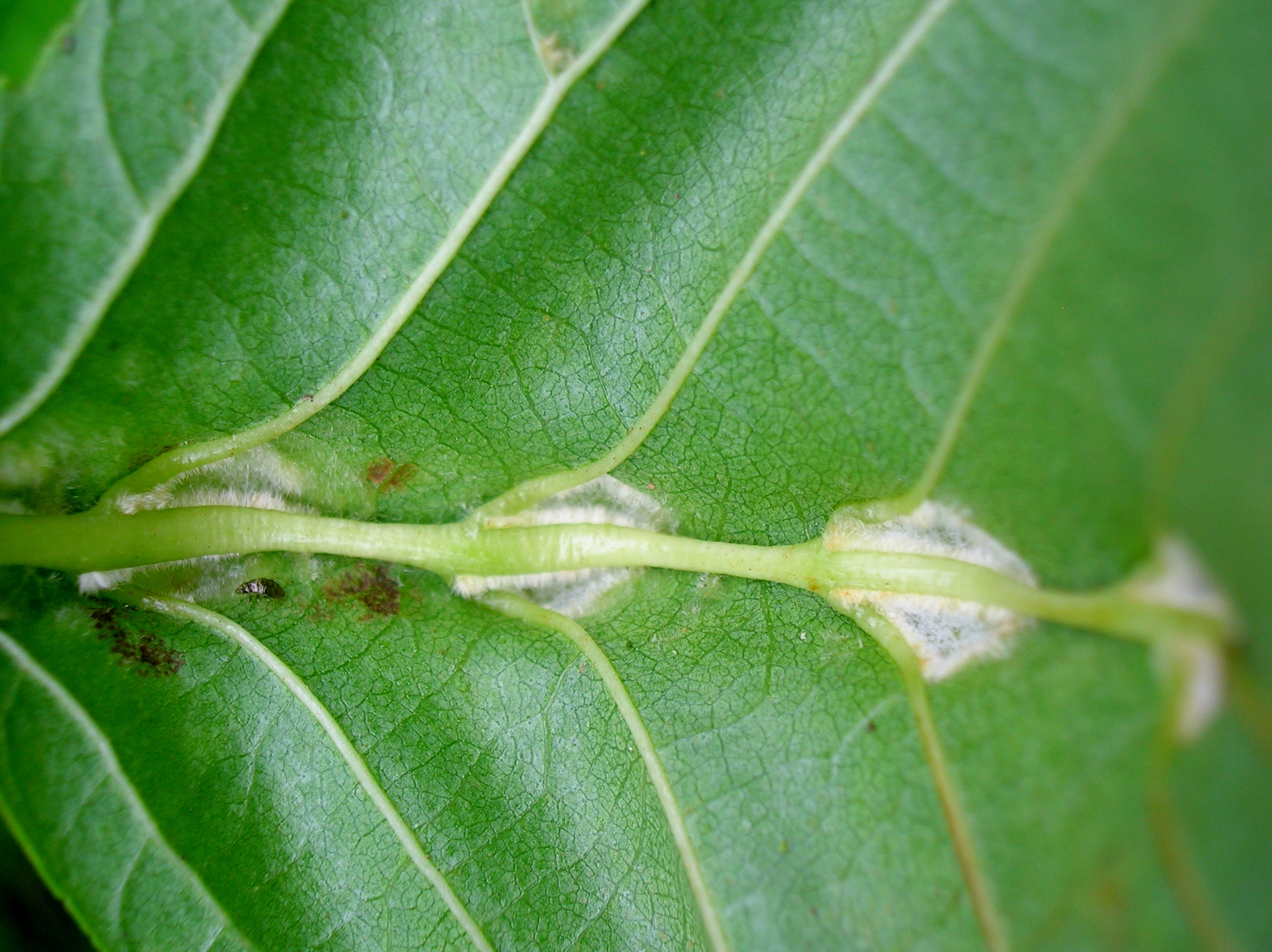
The gall on the lower epidermis.

== Infestations of alder vein angle galls ==
The galls induced appear not to affect the health of trees infected with these mite species and no practical way of controlling or preventing them exists.
