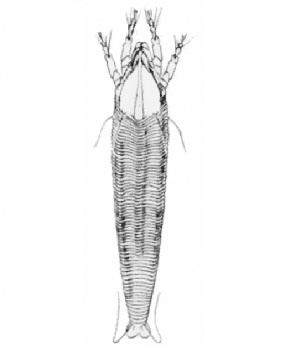

Scientific classification
- Kingdom: Animalia
- Phylum: Arthropoda
- Subphylum: Chelicerata
- Class: Arachnida
- Family: Eriophyidae
- Genus: Abacarus
- Species: A. hystrix

Binomial name
- Abacarus hystrix Nalepa, 1896

= Abacarus hystrix =

Cereal rust mite

Species of mite

Abacarus hystrix, the cereal rust mite or grain rust mite, belongs to the family Eriophyidae. They are extremely small with adults measuring up to 1 millimetre (1/32 inch) in length and only have four legs at the front of the body. Viewing by the human eye requires a 10 – 20X lens. The adult mites are usually yellow but also have been seen to be white or orange. The cereal rust mite was first found on Elymus repens (couch grass), a very common perennial grass species. It has now been found on more than 60 grass species including oats, barley, wheat and ryegrass, found in Europe, North America, South Africa and Australia. Mites migrate primarily through wind movement and are usually found on the highest basal sections of the top two leaf blades. Abacarus hystrix produces up to twenty overlapping generations per year in South Australian perennial pastures, indicating that the species breeds quite rapidly. It has been noted that the cereal rust mite can cause losses in yield of up to 30-70%.

== Life cycle ==
Cereal rust mite eggs are exceptionally small and are placed in leaf vein grooves by the mite. The eggs usually begin hatching at the beginning of spring (March in the Northern Hemisphere and September in the Southern Hemisphere) and once they have reached the juvenile stage, the mites mature very quickly (16–18 days). Once the mites are at the adult stage they often travel to the lower section of the plant where they feed on young tissues. Mites are always present for the full growing season of the plant, but activity has been seen to decrease as the temperature begins to rise, this is because unlike other mite species the cereal rust mite favors cooler temperatures.

== Hosts ==
=== Impacts of mite on grasses ===
==== As a vector ====
Abacarus hystrix is a vector for two viruses (Agropyron mosaic and Ryegrass mosaic) and also causes direct damage to the leaf.

===== Agropyron Mosaic Virus =====
Appearance on hosts is associated with each other, but no direct confirmation of transmission. Likely is a vector, but a low-efficiency one. (Note: p. 264, "Slykhuis (1962) commonly encountered the eriophyids ...A. hystrix... on naturally diseased plants but was not able to demonstrate transmission by [this] species. Later, Slykhuis (1969) reported that when mites from pure populations of A. hystrix reared on A. repens or wheat infected with AgMV by manual inoculation were blown by fan to proximate healthy wheat plants, a low percentage of the plants became infected. No healthy plants became infected in similar experiments using pure populations of [other suspected vectors]. Catherall and Chamberlain (1975) confirmed spread to healthy plants when air was blown from infected plants infested with A. hystrix. To date no further studies of the role played by A. hystrix in the spread of AgMV have been published, perhaps owing to the relatively low economic importance of the disease.")

===== Ryegrass Mosaic Virus =====
The effect of RMV - which is only transmitted by this mite (Note: p. 262, "The eriophyid mite A. hystrix is the only known vector of RgMV. According to Mulligan (1960), mites remain inoculative up to 24 hours after removal from infected plants and all active instars are able to transmit the virus.") - is chlorotic streaks on the leaves. A. hystrix can only transmit it for 24 hours and all motile instars are potential vectors. Overall A. hystrix and RMV have a close relationship. As soon as RMV begins to noticeably degrade host health, the vector will begin to abandon the plant in favor of healthier neighbors - transmitting it again. Chemical control of the mite controls the virus. There are no resistant varieties and little information on genetic sources of resistance that could be used, but there are virus-resistant varieties. (Note: p. 263, "RgMV can spread very quickly. During the first year of the sward more than 70% of ryegrass plants may become infected; but up to 5 years may pass before most or all of the remaining plants become infected (Heard and Chapman, 1986). Abacarus hystrix can walk between leaves and spread through at least one meter of sward during summer and autumn. Wind-borne mites are responsible for more distant spread of the virus (Gibson, 1981). In Wales (Great Britain), colonization of uninfested ryegrass plants occurs from June to October (A'Brook, 1975). The development of populations of A. hystrix on turf grasses (L. perenne, Agrostis tenuis Sibthorp and D. glomerata) was studied at one location in Germany during 4 years. The grasses were cut at 2-3 week intervals from the end of May until the end of August. Multiplication of A. hystrix started in July. Maximum populations were attained during autumn and winter. During spring and summer populations were very low (Proeseler, 1972a). In Great Britain, Gibson (1976) reported fewer A. hystrix on RgMV-infected plants of L. multiflorum than on healthy plants; multiplication was slower on infected plants than on healthy plants, and mites dispersed more readily from infected plants. All measures that restricted populations of A. hystrix also controlled RgMV (Gibson, 1981). Since old plants constitute a major source of both the virus and the vector, it is mandatory to destroy all old ryegrass plants prior to replanting. Application of aldicarb to seedbeds or repeated application of sprays of endosulfan or the synthetic pyrethroid fenpropathrin, reduced vector populations and the incidence of infection by RgMV; however, use of aldicarb is especially undesirable, owing to its high mammalian toxicity (Lewis, 1982). Control of A. hystrix by fungal pathogens may offer an alternative means of limiting the effects of RgMV. Lewis and Heard (1982) found A. hystrix parasitized by Hirsutella thompsonii Fisher, Verticillium lecanii (Zimmerman) Viegas and two undescribed species of Hirsutella. According to McCoy and Couch (1979) commercially available H. thompsonii is already used as a bioacaricide for control of the citrus rust mite, Phyllocoptruta oleivora (Ashmead). Although little information exists on resistance of ryegrass to A. hystrix, some RgMV-resistant genotypes of ryegrass (especially perennial ryegrasses) exist. Salehuzzanian and Wilkins (1984) and Catherall (1986) described different types of resistance to RgMV, including 1) polygenic inherited resistance to infection, which is effective against all strains of RgMV, 2) post-infection resistance (i.e., resistance to virus multiplication and spread) which is inherited by two recessive genes and is effective against specific RgMV strains, and 3) tolerance. The polygenic resistance to RgMV possessed by the perennial ryegrass cultivar 'S. 23' was successfully transferred to Italian ryegrass by repeated cycles of backcrossing, polycrossing and selection, resulting in the RgMV-resistant cultivar 'Bb 2113' (Wilkins, 1987).")

Not a vector of Wheat Streak Mosaic, although does visit and eat from WSMV victims. Likely reason for lack of successful transmission is degradation of the virus particles during digestion. (Note: p. 261, "He also examined A. hystrix (a non-vector of WSMV) that had fed on WSMV-infected plants and found small numbers of WSMV particles in the posterior midgut. Such particles appeared degraded and shorter than typical WSMV particles found in the gut of A. tulipae.")

==== Feeding ====
When the mite feeds on grooves of the leaf surface, it prefers the large cells on the smooth bottom of the groove as opposed to the more ridged, small cells of the side walls. Mite feeding causes direct damage to the leaves, which can be noticed as discoloration or “rusting” of the leaf. There are likely specific biotypes for particular hosts. (Note: p. 262-3, "According to Keifer (1945), A. hystrix is widely distributed on perennial grasses throughout the Northern Hemisphere. Nonetheless, the inability of A. hystrix from ryegrass to colonize other graminaceous species including timothy, maize, barley, oats, and wheat (Gibson 1974) suggests the existence of biotypes adapted to specific members of the Poaceae.")

== Eradication and management options ==
As a precaution, fields should be checked regularly for mites before spring. By the use of a quadrat system, random plants are selected from different locations in the field. When checking, look for eggs and juvenile mites in the specific area of the leaf veins. A potential management option is to reduce the length of the grass in the cooler months. Studies have shown that trimming grasses reduces the number of mites and since the mites are vectors of many viruses, these viruses are spread less quickly.
