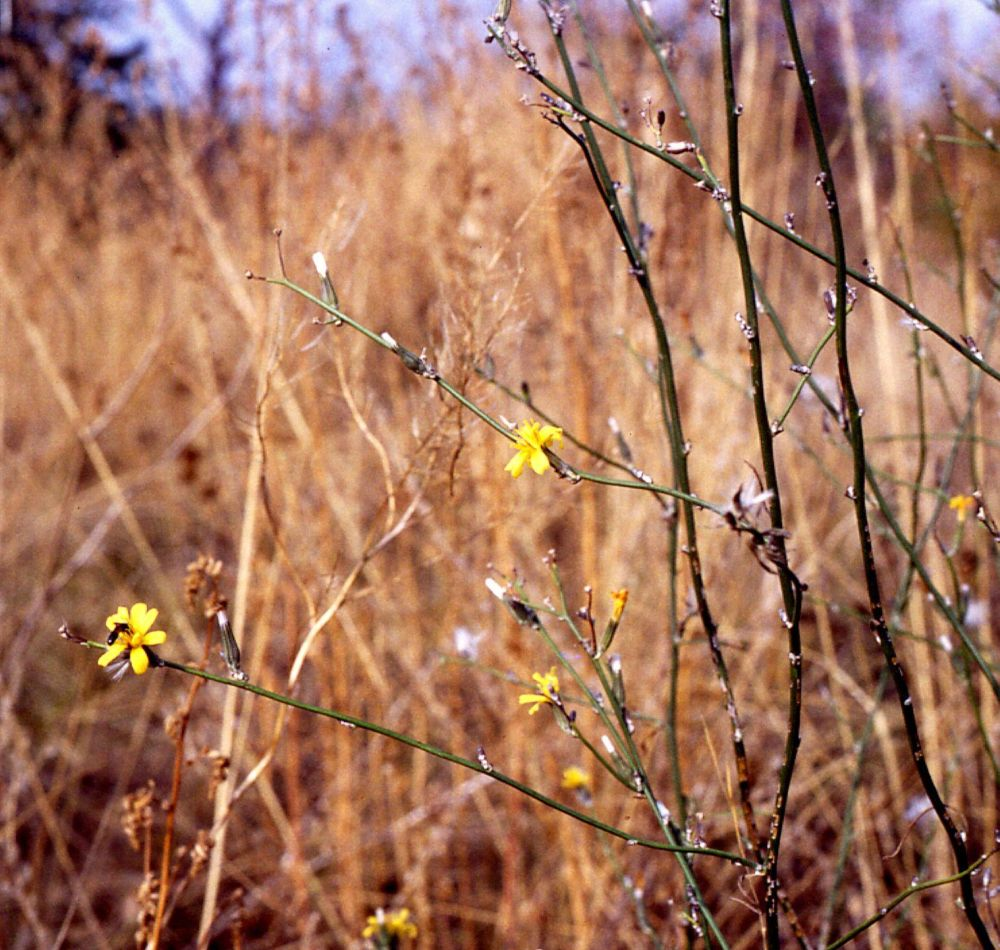

Scientific classification
- Kingdom: Plantae
- Clade: Embryophytes
- Clade: Tracheophytes
- Clade: Angiosperms
- Clade: Eudicots
- Clade: Asterids
- Order: Asterales
- Family: Asteraceae
- Genus: Chondrilla
- Species: C. juncea

Binomial name
- Chondrilla juncea L.

Synonyms
- C. acantholepis Boiss.

= Chondrilla juncea =

Species of flowering plant

Chondrilla juncea is a species of flowering plant in the family Asteraceae known by a number of common names, including rush skeletonweed, gum succory, devil's grass, and nakedweed. The plant is native to Europe, Asia, and North Africa, but it is known throughout most temperate regions of the world as an introduced species which is usually considered a noxious weed.

== Description ==
It is a thin, spindly plant which reaches a meter in height. It starts from a basal rosette of leaves and branches extensively, often forming a weedy thicket. It produces small dandelionlike flowers with rectangular yellow ray florets. The fruit is an achene about a centimeter long topped with a white pappus. It reproduces by seed but also by cloning itself at the root; tilling of soil and chopping up plants actually help this species disperse by sectioning and distributing root parts.

== Distribution ==
=== Native ===
From the Aral Sea area in Kazakhstan and Uzbekistan in Central Asia, westward through Russia, through Europe, to Portugal; and southward through the Caucasus and Southwest Asia, and west to North Africa.

=== Introduced ===
North America, earlier only on the East Coast, but by the 1960s reaching Washington, Oregon, and northern California. Weed in Eastern Australia.

== Weed risk ==
This plant is considered a very troublesome weed in many areas. It easily invades fields, clogs harvesting machines, and successfully competes with other plants for water. There are several biological control measures used against this plant. The skeletonweed gall midge (Cystiphora schmidti - an insect), the skeletonweed gall mite (Aceria chondrillae - an arachnid), and skeletonweed rust (Puccinia chondrillina - a rust fungus of Chondrilla) all show potential for controlling infestations.

== Uses ==
In the Greek island of Crete the leaves and the tender shoots of a local variety called ampelosyrida (αμπελοσυρίδα) or glykosyrida (γλυκοσυρίδα) are eaten raw or boiled in salads by the locals. The plant is also traditionally consumed by ethnic Albanians (Arbëreshë) in the Vulture area (southern Italy). Chondrilla juncea may have an anti-oxidant activity and some potential for medicinal use. XO-inhibiting activity shown by extracts of the aerial parts of the plant with potential benefits for hyperuricaemia and gout. In the eastern region of Turkey, chewing gum is obtained from the body of the plant.
