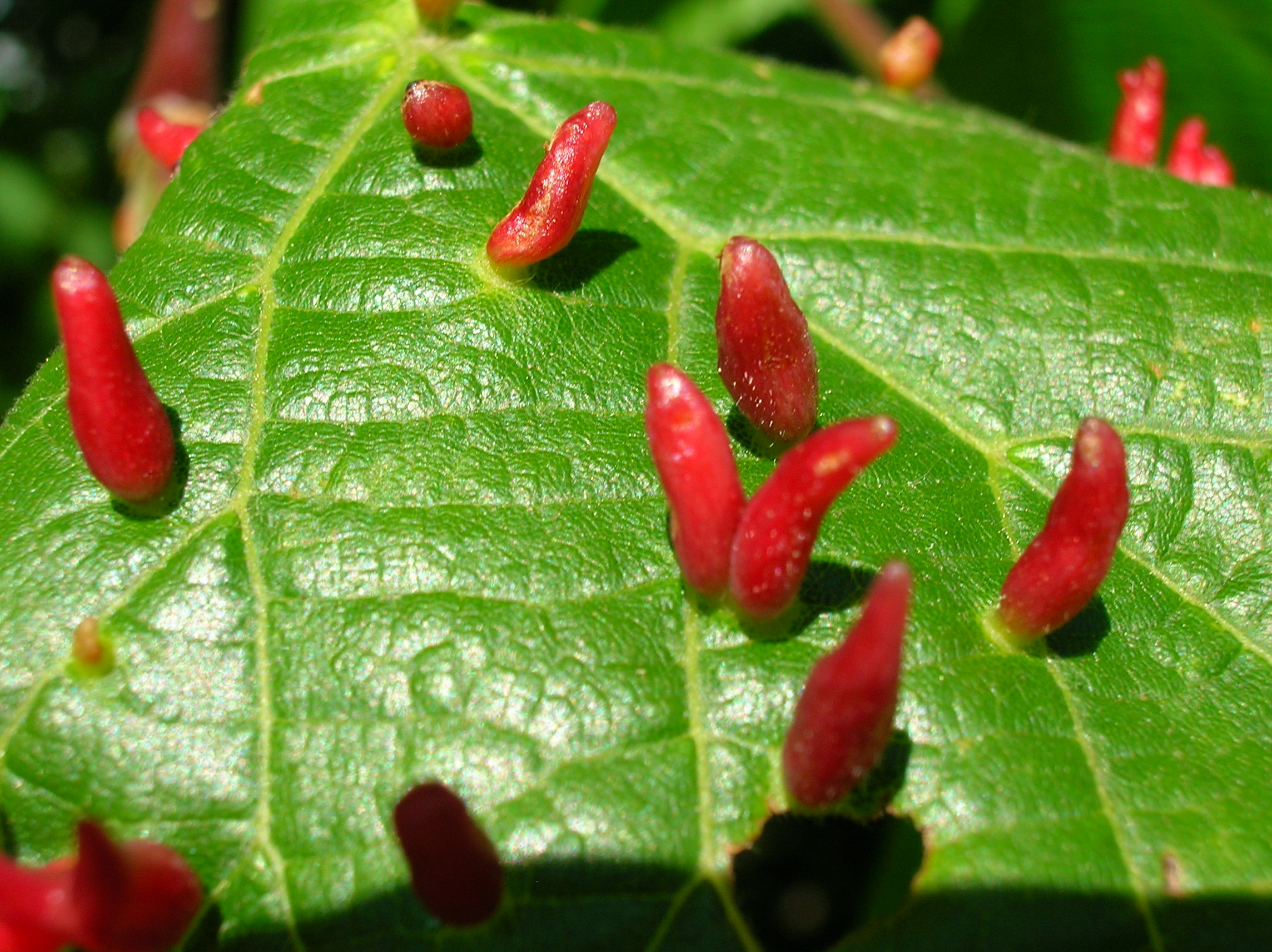
- Eriophyes tiliae tiliae galls

Scientific classification
- Kingdom: Animalia
- Phylum: Arthropoda
- Subphylum: Chelicerata
- Class: Arachnida
- Superfamily: Eriophyoidea
- Family: Eriophyidae; Nalepa, 1898

Diversity
- > 240 genera, > 3,500 species

= Eriophyidae =

Eriophyidae Temporal range: Palaeogene–present

Family of mites

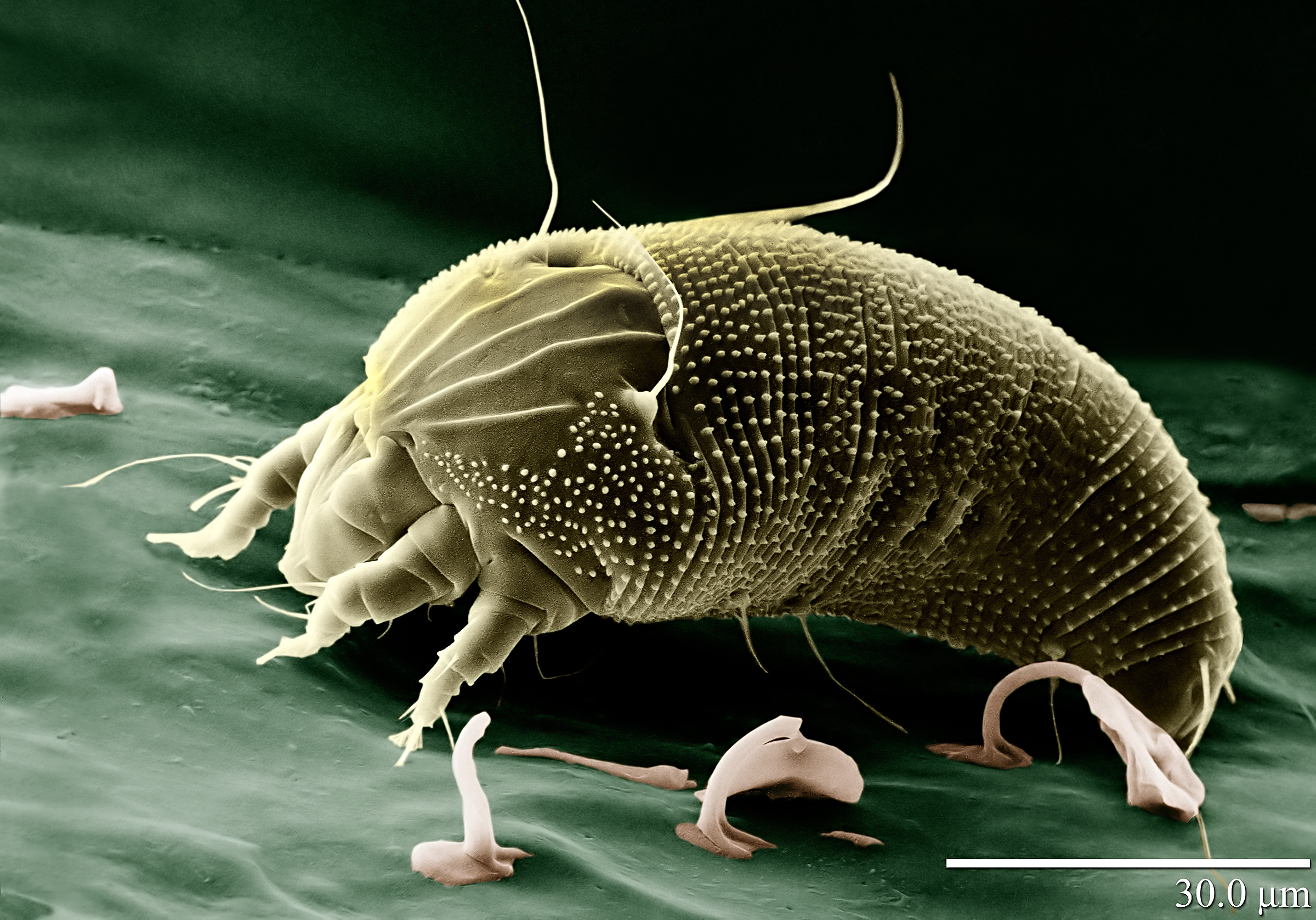
Rust mite, Aceria anthocoptes

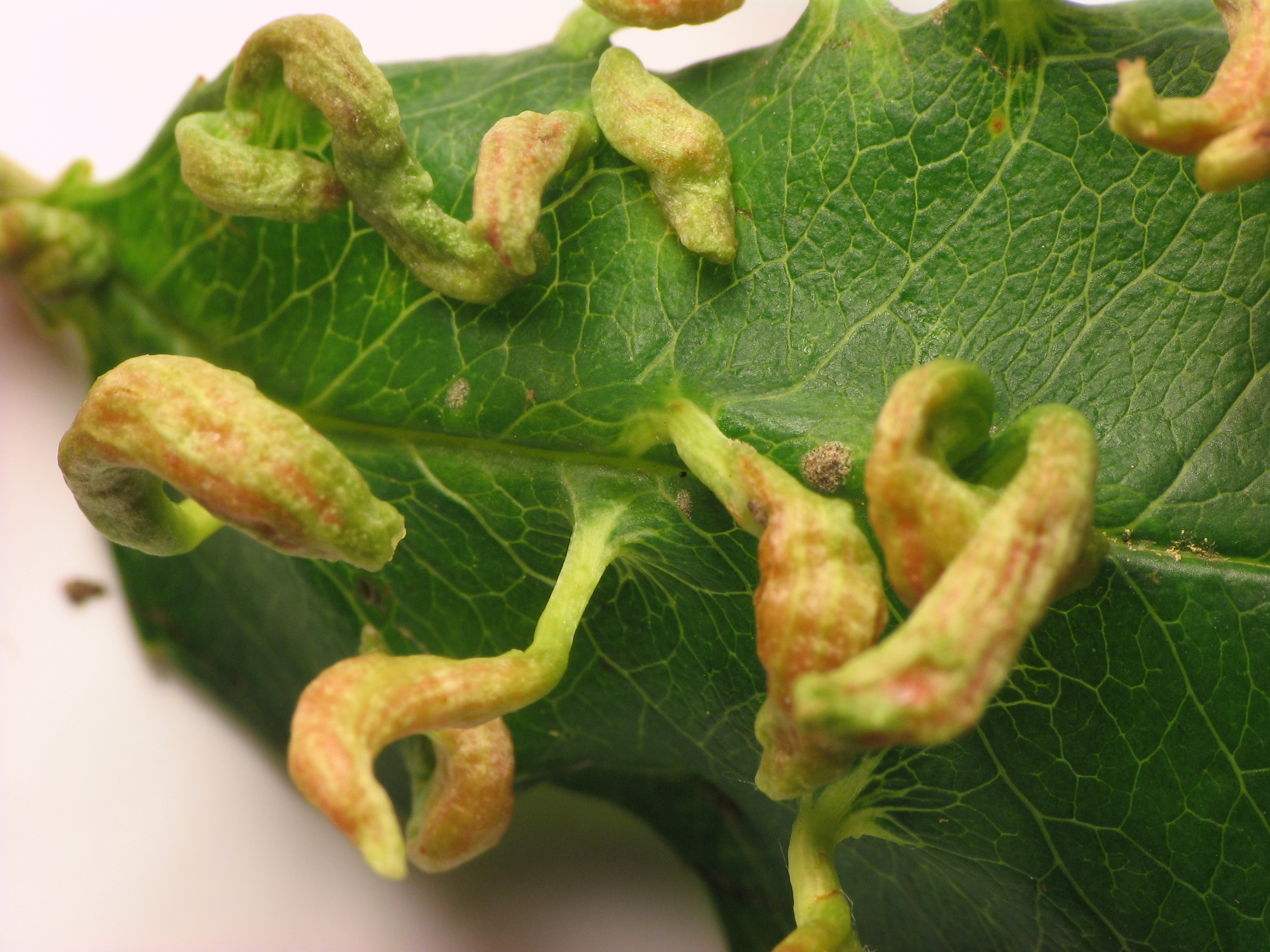
Eriophyes cerasicrumena, galls on cherry

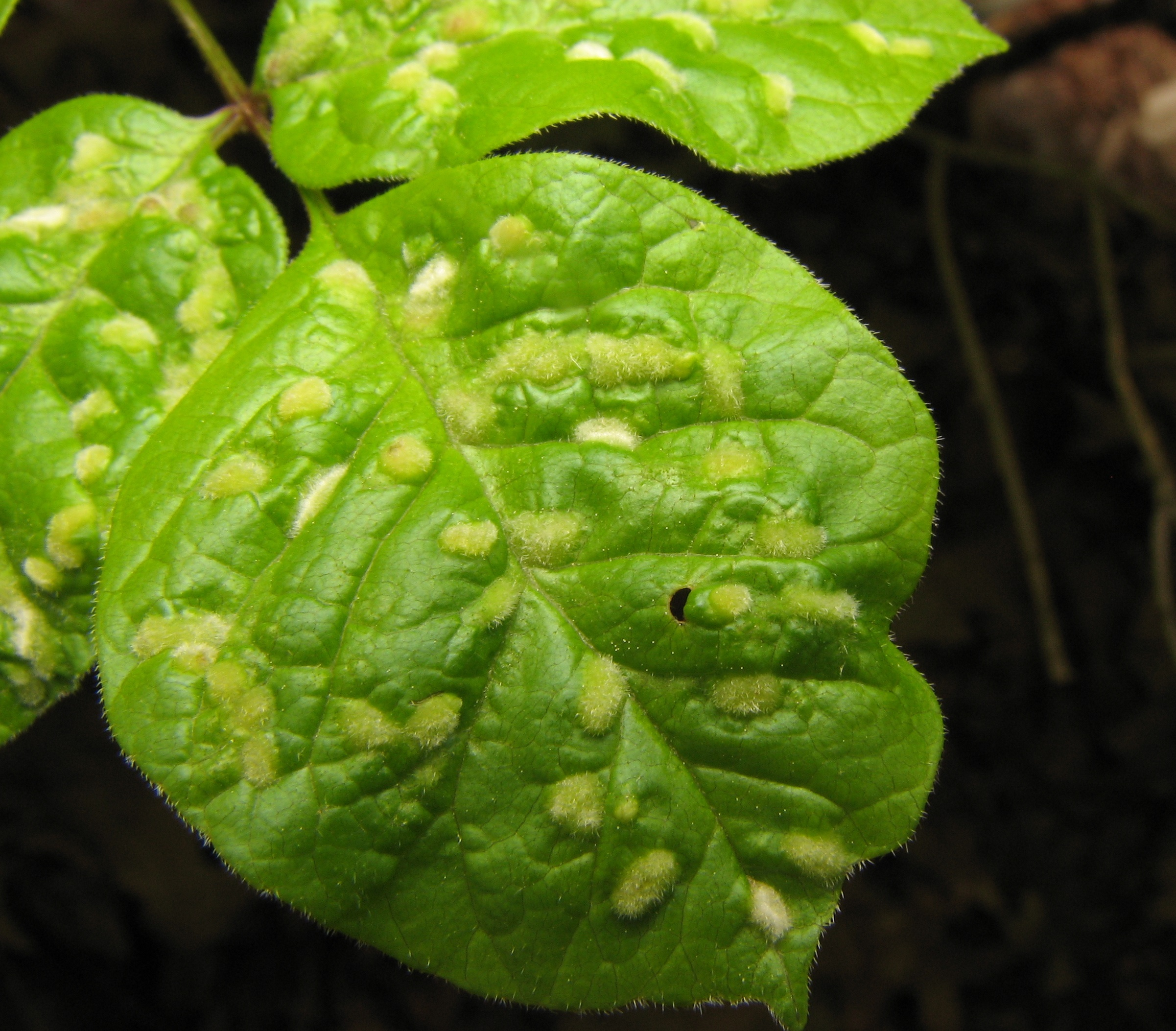
Aceria fraxini, galls

Eriophyidae is a family of more than 200 genera of mites, which live as plant parasites, commonly causing galls or other damage to the plant tissues and hence known as gall mites. About 3,600 species have been described, but this is probably less than 10% of the actual number existing in this poorly researched family. They are microscopic mites and are yellow to pinkish white to purplish in color. The mites are worm like, and have only two pairs of legs. Their primary method of population spread is by wind. They affect a wide range of plants, and several are major pest species causing substantial economic damage to crops. Some species, however, are used as biological agents to control weeds and invasive plant species.

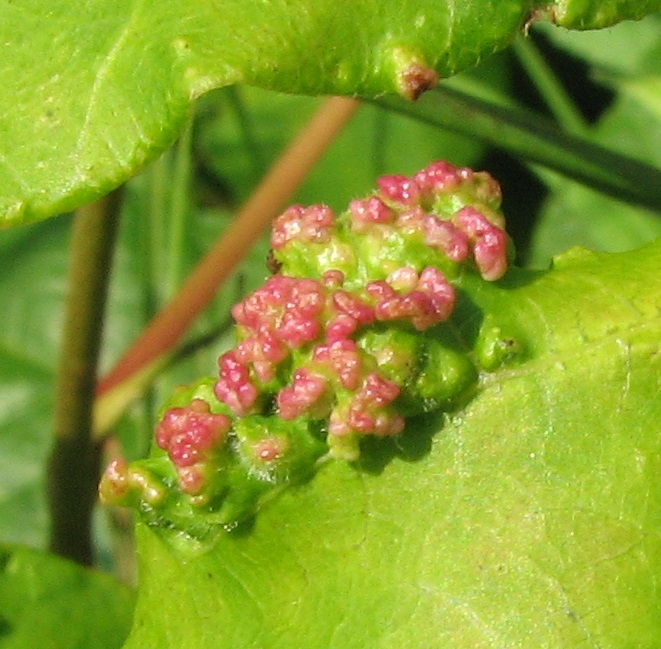
Aculops rhois, galls on poison ivy

== Notable species ==
Notable species in this family include:

- Abacarus hystrix, the cereal rust mite
- Abacarus sacchari, the sugarcane rust mite
- Acalitus essigi, the redberry mite, which affects blackberries
- Aceria chondrillae, the chondrilla gall mite, an agent of biological control against skeleton weed (Chondrilla juncea)
- Aceria guerreronis, a mite of coconuts
- Aceria malherbae, the bindweed gall mite, an agent of biological control against field bindweed (Convolvulus arvensis)
- Cecidophyopsis ribis, blackcurrant gall mite, important pest of several Ribes
- Eriophyes padi, a mite that causes cherry pouch galls on black cherry trees

== Selected genera ==
- Abacarus
- Aberoptus
- Acalitus
- Acaphylla
- Acaphyllisa
- Acaralox
- Acarelliptus
- Acaricalus
- Aceria
- Achaetocoptes
- Acritonotus
- Aculochetus
- Aculodes
- Aculops
- Aculus
- Adenoptus
- Aequsomatus
- Anthocoptes
- Bariella
- Boczekiana
- Brachendus
- Calacarus
- Calepitrimerus
- Callyntrotus
- Cecidophyes
- Cecidophyopsis
- Cisaberiptus
- Colomerus
- Coptophylla
- Cosetacus
- Criotacus
- Cupacarus
- Cymoptus
- Dichopelmus
- Diphytoptus
- Ditrymacus
- Epitrimerus
- Eriophyes
- Floracarus
- Gilarovella
- Glyptacus
- Keiferella
- Kolacarus
- Kyllocarus
- Leipothrix
- Liroella
- Mesalox
- Metaculus
- Monochetus
- Neooxycenus
- Neotegonotus
- Oxycenus
- Paraphytoptus
- "Pentamerus" Roivainen, 1951 (non Sowerby, 1813: preoccupied)
- Phyllocoptes
- Phyllocoptruta
- Platyphytoptus
- Reckella
- Shevtchenkella
- Stenacis
- Tegolophus
- Tegonotus
- Tegoprionus
- Tetra
- Tetraspinus
- Thamnacus
- Tumescoptes
- Vasates
