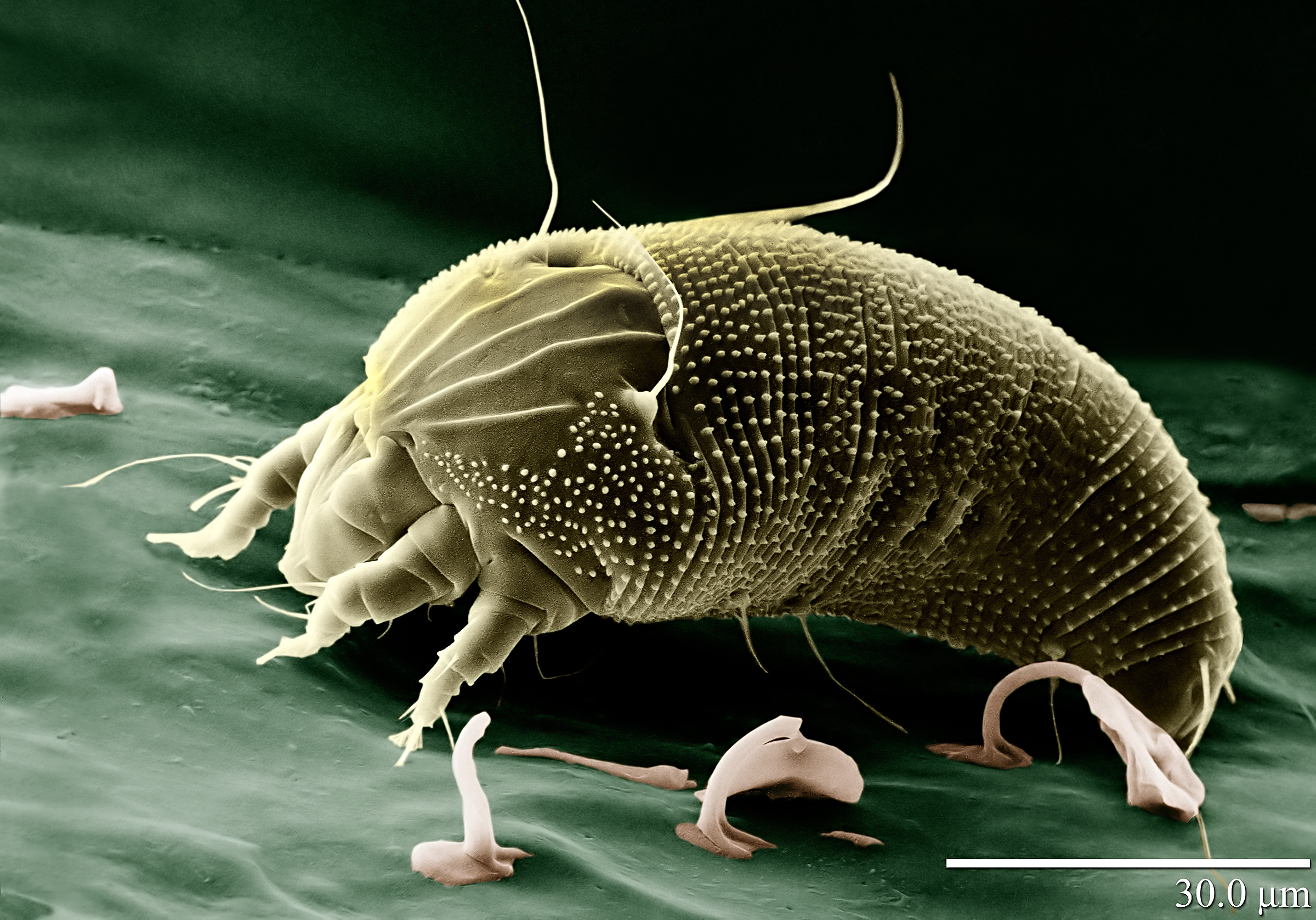
- Colored SEM of Aceria anthocoptes (rust mite); White bar is 30 µm.

Scientific classification
- Kingdom: Animalia
- Phylum: Arthropoda
- Subphylum: Chelicerata
- Class: Arachnida
- Family: Eriophyidae
- Genus: Aceria; Keifer, 1944

Species
- 900+, see text

= Aceria =

Genus of mites

Aceria is a genus of mites belonging to the family Eriophyidae, the gall mites. These tiny animals are parasites of plants. Several species can cause blistering and galls, including erineum galls. A few are economically significant pests, while others are useful as agents of biological pest control of invasive plants such as rush skeletonweed (Chondrilla juncea), creeping thistle (Cirsium arvense), and field bindweed (Convolvulus arvensis). There are over 900 species in the genus.

In 2017, a new species, Aceria pycnocomi was found on Pycnocomon rutifolium in Spain.

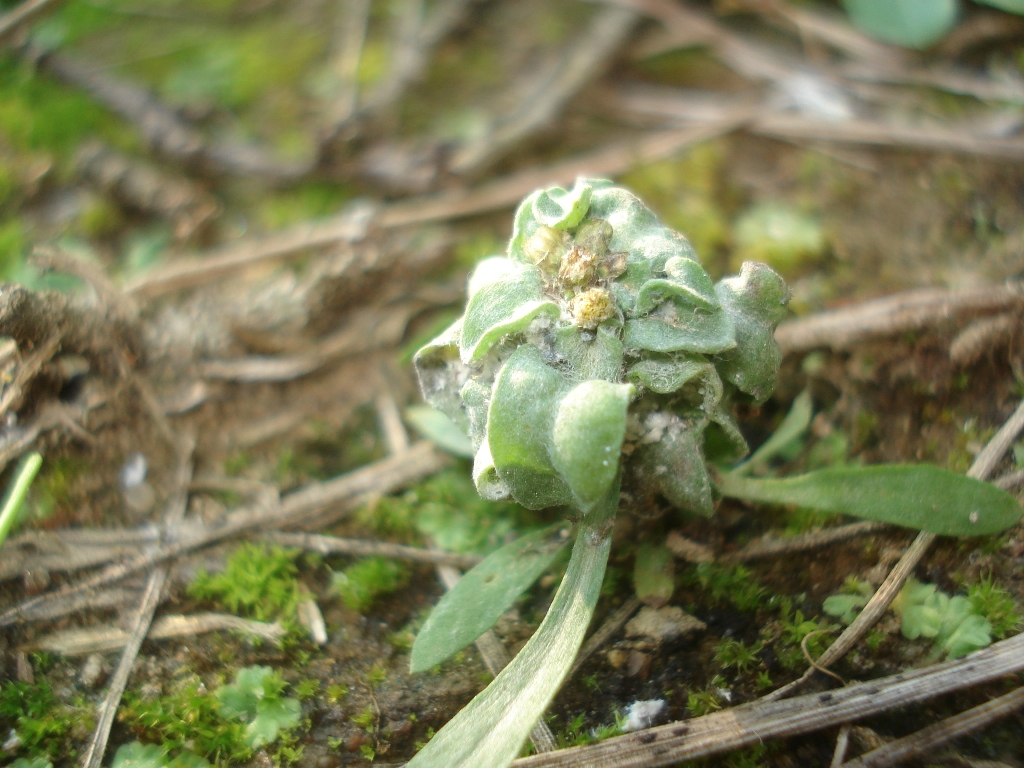
Oregano (Origanum vulgare) afflicted by Aceria labiatiflorae

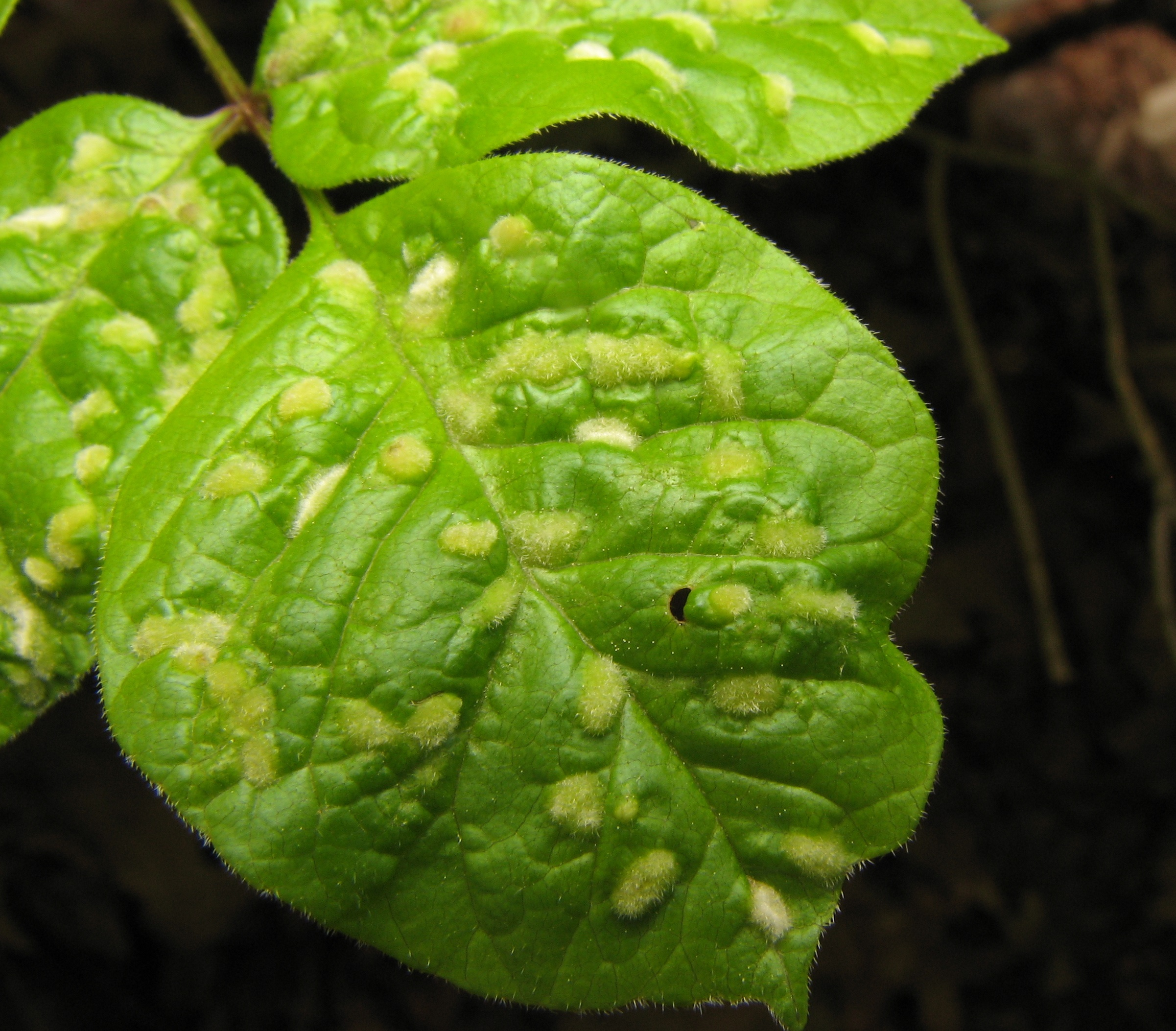
Aceria fraxini

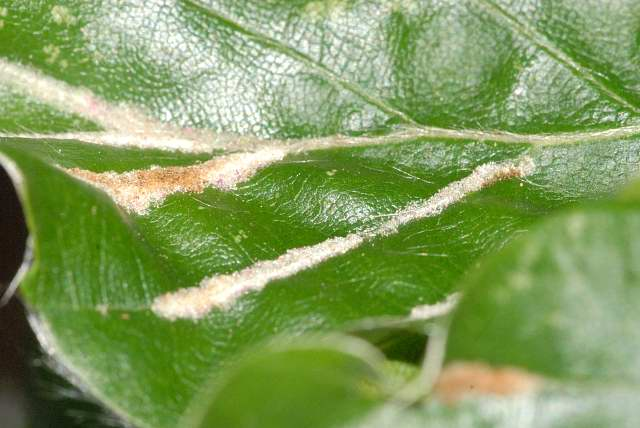
Aceria nervisequa damage

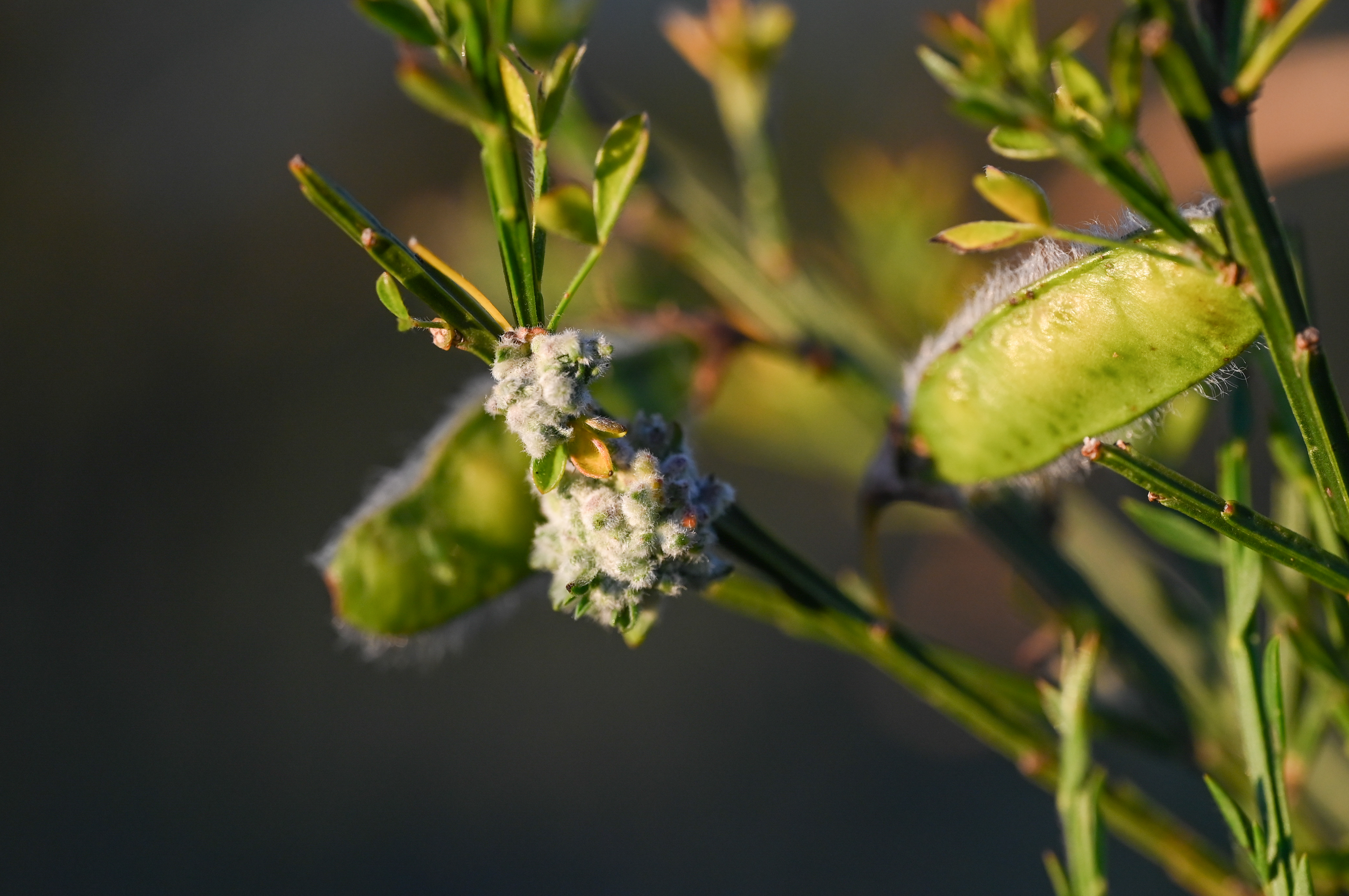
Common broom (Cytisus scoparius) afflicted by Aceria genistae

== Selected species ==
- Aceria aloinis Keifer, 1941 – aloe mite
- Aceria anthocoptes Nalepa, 1892 – rust mite, russet mite
- Aceria baccharices Keifer, 1945 – Arroyo willow mite
- Aceria banatica Vidovic, 2011
- Aceria bipedis Manson, 1984
- Aceria brachytarsus
- Acaria cajani Mitra, 1931
- Aceria calaceris Keifer, 1952 – western maple erineum mite
- Aceria calystegiae Lamb, 1952
- Aceria campestricola (Frauenfeld, 1865)
- Aceria capreae Manson, 1984
- Aceria carmichaeliae Lamb, 1952
- Aceria caulis
- Aceria chondrillae Canestrini, 1891 – skeletonweed gall mite, chondrilla gall mite
- Aceria clianthi Lamb, 1952
- Aceria cynodoniensis Sayed, 1946
- Aceria depressae Manson, 1984
- Aceria diospyri Keifer, 1944
- Aceria elongata Hodgkiss, 1913 – crimson erineum mite
- Aceria erinea Nalepa, 1891
- Aceria eriobotryae Keifer, 1938
- Aceria ficus Cotte, 1920
- Aceria fraxini (Garman, 1883) – ash bead gall mite
- Aceria fraxiniflora (Felt, 1906) – ash flower gall mite
- Aceria fraxinicola Nalepa, 1890
- Aceria fraxinivora Nalepa, 1909
- Aceria gallae T.Huang, 1996
- Aceria genistae Nalepa, 1891 – broom gall mite
- Aceria gersoni Manson, 1984
- Aceria gleicheniae Manson, 1984
- Aceria guerreronis Keifer, 1965
- Aceria hagleyensis Manson, 1984
- Aceria healyi Manson, 1970
- Aceria hibisci Nalepa, 1906
- Aceria ilicis (Canestrini, 1890)
- Aceria iteina Nalepa, 1925
- Aceria jasmini Channabasavanna, 1966
- Aceria jasminoidis Huang, 2001
- Aceria korelli Manson, 1984
- Aceria kuko Kishida, 1927
- Aceria labiatiflorae Thomas, 1872 (syn. A. oregani)
- Aceria lanyuensis Huang, 2001
- Aceria litchii Keifer, 1943
- Aceria litseae Keifer, 1972
- Aceria lycopersici Wolffenstein, 1879
- Aceria mackiei Keifer, 1938
- Aceria malherbae Nuzzaci, 1985 – bindweed gall mite
- Aceria mangiferae Sayed, 1946
- Aceria manukae Lamb, 1952
- Aceria mayae Manson, 1984
- Aceria melicopis Manson, 1984
- Aceria melicyti Lamb, 1953
- Aceria microphyllae Manson, 1984
- Aceria mikaniae Nalepa, 1918
- Aceria monoica Huang, 2001
- Aceria nervisequa Canestrini, 1891
- Aceria oleae Nalepa 1900
- Aceria parvensis Manson 1972
- Aceria pimeliae Manson, 1984
- Aceria pipturi Keifer, 1966
- Aceria plagianthi Manson, 1984
- Aceria pobuzii Huang, 1996
- Aceria pseudoplatani Corti, 1905
- Aceria roxburghianae Huang, 2008
- Aceria rubifaciens Lamb, 1953
- Aceria sacchari Wang, 1964
- Aceria serratifoliae Huang, 2008
- Aceria sheldoni Ewing, 1937 – citrus bud mite
- Aceria shepherdiae Keifer, 1966
- Aceria simonensis Manson, 1984
- Aceria spicati Stebbins, 1909
- Aceria strictae Manson, 1984
- Aceria sylvestrae Huang, 2008
- Aceria taiwanensis Huang, 2008
- Aceria tenuifolii Manson, 1984
- Aceria titirangiensis Lamb 1953
- Aceria tosichella Keifer, 1969
- Aceria tulipae Keifer, 1938
- Aceria victoriae Ramsay, 1958
- Aceria vitalbae (Canestrini, 1892)
- Aceria waltheri Keifer, 1939
- Aceria virosae Huang, 2008
- Aceria yushania K. Huang, 2001
- Aceria zoysima Manson, 1989
