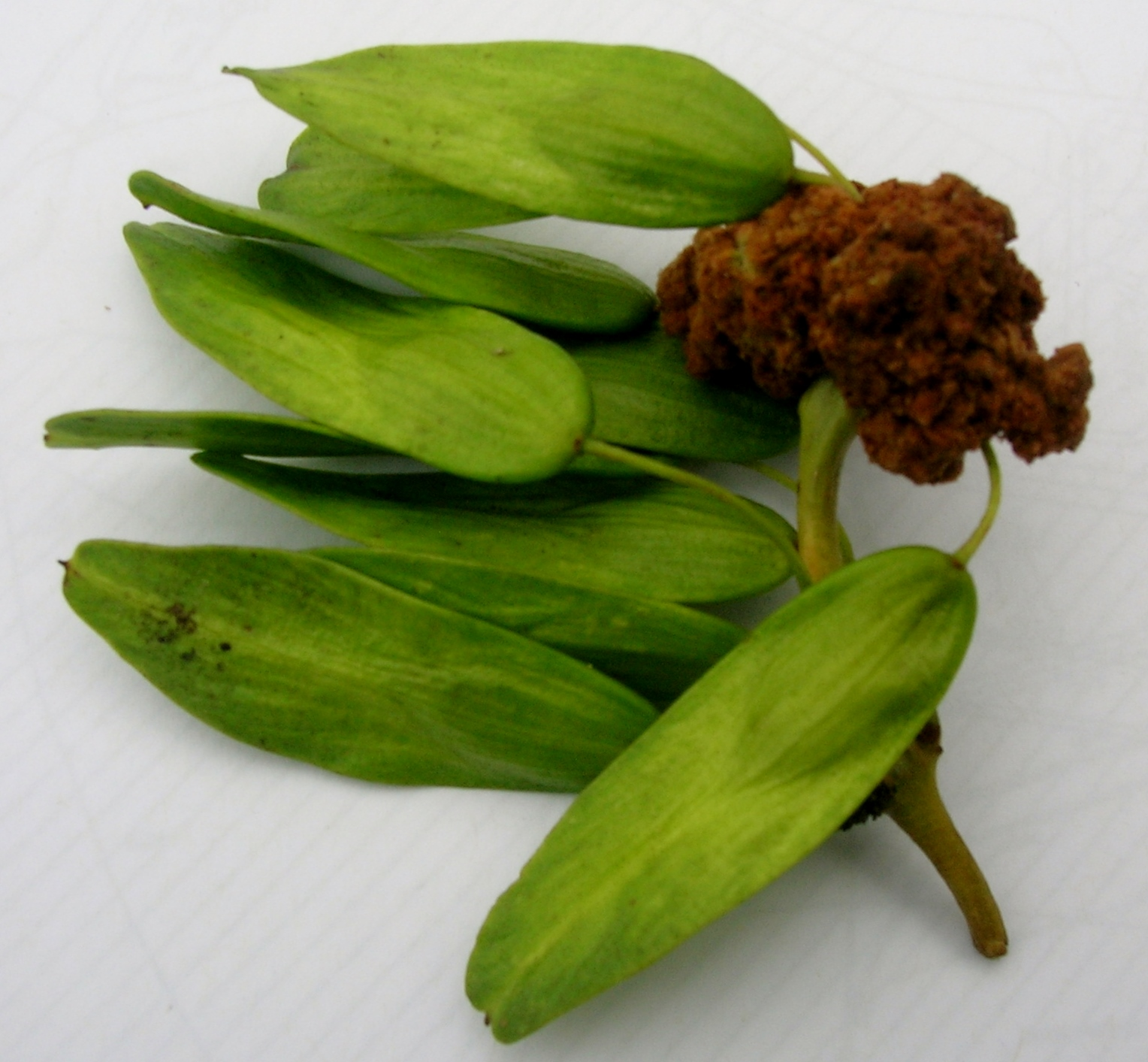
- The ash key gall and unaffected ash keys

Scientific classification
- Domain: Eukaryota
- Kingdom: Animalia
- Phylum: Arthropoda
- Subphylum: Chelicerata
- Class: Arachnida
- Family: Eriophyidae
- Genus: Aceria
- Species: A. fraxinivora

Binomial name
- Aceria fraxinivora Nalepa, 1909

Synonyms
- Eriophyes fraxinivorus Phytoptus fraxini Aceria fraxinivorus

= Aceria fraxinivora =

Species of mite

Aceria fraxinivora, also known as the cauliflower gall mite and the ash key gall, causes the growths, known as galls, found on the hanging seeds or "keys" of the ash (Fraxinus) species.

== Appearance and cause ==
The mite usually attacks the flower clusters soon after they open. The individual gall is no more than 2 cm across but when grouped together can be impressive as they present a sizable irregular deformity formed from the fused and swollen flower stalks (pedicels). The gall has also been found on buds, leaf stalks, twigs or trunks. It is brown when fully formed, finally black, but green at first. Once the leaves have fallen, the galls, filled with mites, are obvious and may remain for a year or more. Leaflets or entire leaves and petioles may also be involved, with additional distortions such as thickening and leaf lamina rolling, especially when the tree is heavily infested. Almost every inflorescence may be involved, the reproductive capacity therefore being reduced, however some seeds may still develop normally amongst the galls.

The cause of the gall are mites, mainly female, the eggs being viable without fertilization. These gall-mites are specialist species; they are cylindrical and feed on sap, and have no circulation or respiratory systems, only two pairs of legs and no eyes.

Species of ash galled, include white ash or American ash (Fraxinus americana), narrow-leafed ash (Fraxinus angustifolia & subsp. oxycarpa), Bunge's ash (Fraxinus bungeana), common ash (Fraxinus excelsior), manna ash (Fraxinus ornus), green ash or red ash (Fraxinus pennsylvanica).

== Distribution ==
The ash key gall is widespread in Britain; its numbers vary with the changes in annual seed production levels. In France and the Netherlands they are known as cauliflower galls.

== Inquilines ==
Other acarine gall-mites, aphids, psyllids, and midges are often found within the galls, including the larvae of the gall midge Arthrocnodax fraxinellus which predates the mites of Aceria fraxinivora.
