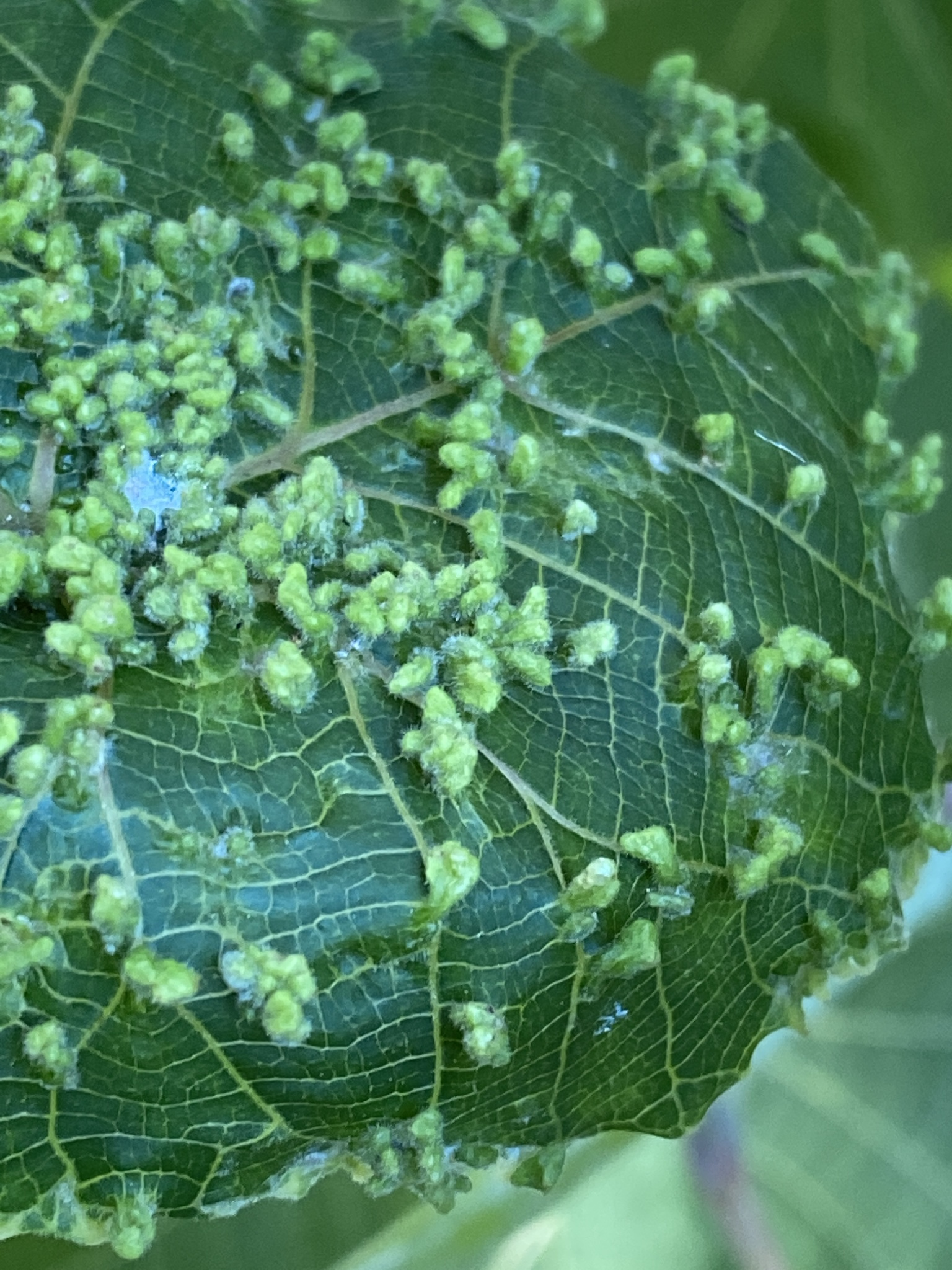
- Several Aceria hibisci on a leaf

Scientific classification
- Kingdom: Animalia
- Phylum: Arthropoda
- Subphylum: Chelicerata
- Class: Arachnida
- Order: Trombidiformes
- Family: Eriophyidae
- Genus: Aceria
- Species: A. hibisci

Binomial name
- Aceria hibisci (Nalepa, 1906)

Synonyms
- Eriophys hibisci Nalepa, 1906

= Aceria hibisci =

Species of mite

Aceria hibisci, commonly known as the hibiscus erineum mite or hibiscus leaf-crumpling mite, is a species of eriophyid mite in the genus Aceria.

== Description ==
Adult hibiscus erineum mites are microscopic arthropods that are not visible to the naked eye. Their bodies are soft, elongated, and vermiform in shape, and are divided into two principal regions: the gnathosoma, which bears the mouthparts, and the idiosoma which forms the remainder of the body.

As members of the family Eriophyidae, they differ from most other mites in possessing only two pairs of legs rather than the typical four pairs. This reduced number of legs is a distinguishing characteristic of eriophyid mites.

== Lifecycle ==
In tropical and subtropical regions, the hibiscus erineum mite undergoes development through four life stages: egg, two nymphal instars, and adult. The nymphs are morphologically similar to adults but are smaller in size.

Development occurs within the protective gall tissue formed on the host plant, where the mites feed, reproduce, and complete their life cycle. Observations of rapid gall formation on infected hibiscus plants suggest that the life cycle may be completed in under three weeks under favorable conditions.

== Taxonomy ==
The species was first discovered in Hibiscus rosa-sinensis plants in Fiji and described by Austrian acarologist Alfred Nalepa in 1906 as Eriophys hibisci. American zoologist Hartford H. Keifer later reclassified the species under Aceria in 1966, noting that the mite did not possess a ridge at the rear of the mite's head, found in similar species.

== Distribution ==
The species has been reported from numerous tropical and subtropical regions, including Hawaii, Tonga, parts of Australia, and Brazil. In Hawaii, it was first detected on hibiscus plants at Wheeler Air Force Base near Wahiawa, Oahu, in 1989 and subsequently spread to all major islands in the area.
