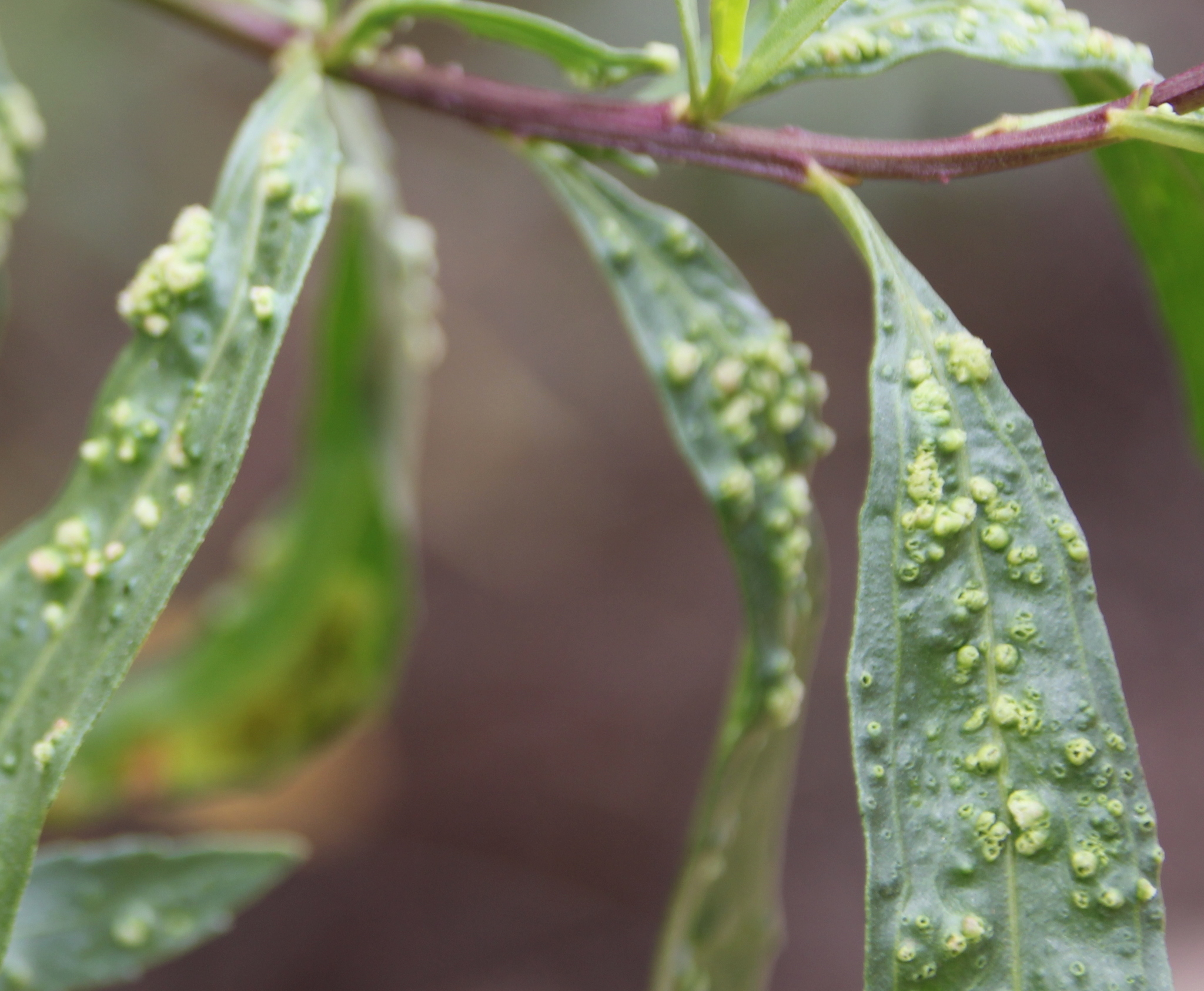

Scientific classification
- Kingdom: Animalia
- Phylum: Arthropoda
- Subphylum: Chelicerata
- Class: Arachnida
- Family: Eriophyidae
- Genus: Aceria
- Species: A. baccharices

Binomial name
- Aceria baccharices Kiefer, 1945

= Aceria baccharices =

North American gall-inducing mite

Aceria baccharices, also known as the mulefat leaf-blister mite and formerly known as Eriophyes baccharices, is a species of arachnid native to North America that induces galls on two California willows, Baccharis salicifolia and Baccharis glutinosa. This mite was first described to science by Hartford H. Keifer in 1945. According to Keifer, "the typical host is the long-leaf type Baccharis which is common to dry washes in northern California. The other host is similar but confined to the south." These galls, which look like warty protrusions from the surface of the leaf, are nurseries for the next generation of mites. The adults eventually leave the leaf via anterior exit holes that may be visible.

Aceria baccharices should not confused with Aceria baccharipha, the Baccharis leaf blister mite.
