= Mandari =

Mandari may refer to:

- Mandari people, ethnic group of South Sudan, one of the Nilotic peoples
- Mandari dialect, dialect of the Mandari people
- Malayalam word for the disease of the eriophyid coconut mite Eriophyes guerreronis
