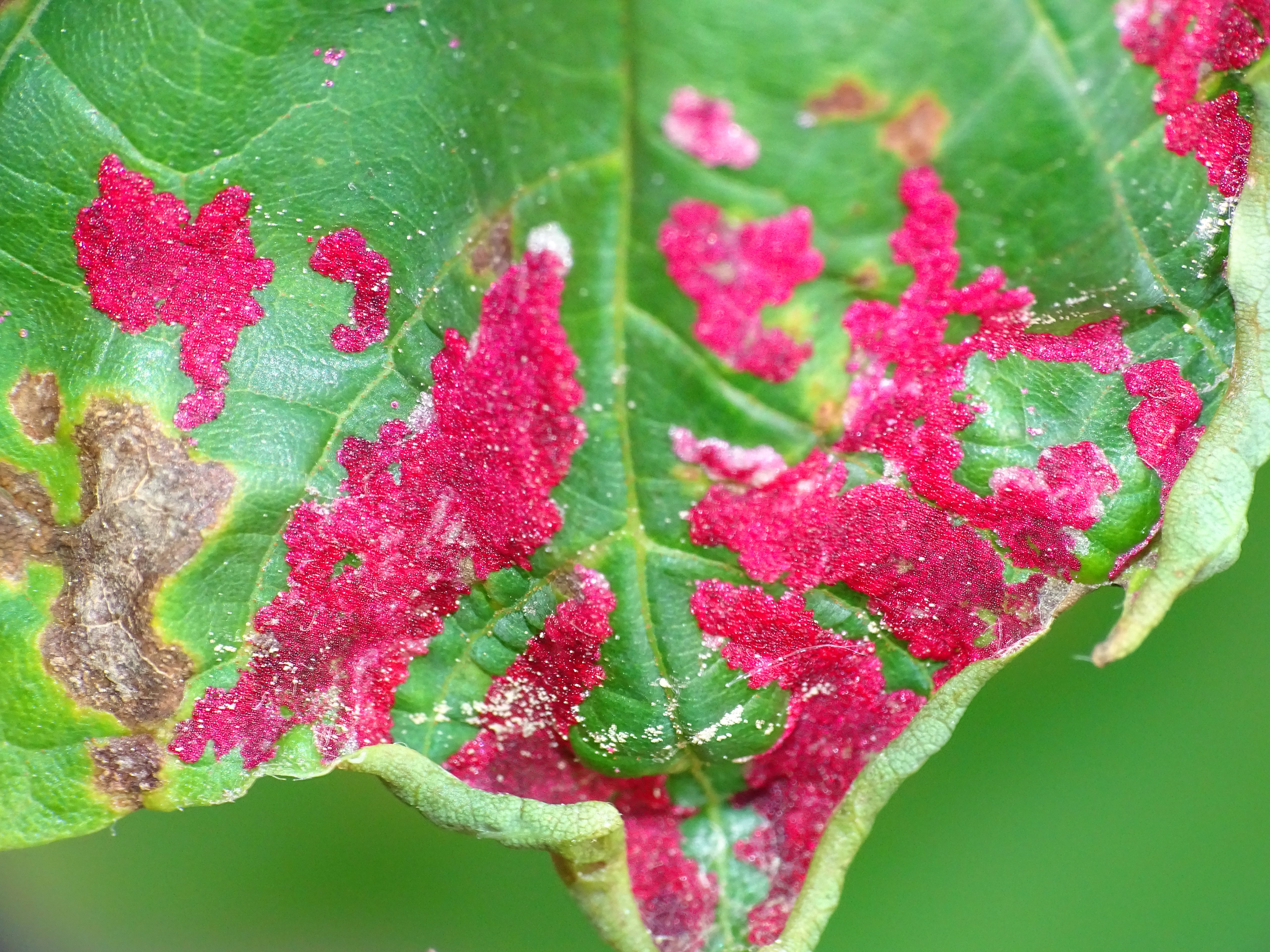
- Aceria elongata galls on Acer saccharum leaf

Scientific classification
- Domain: Eukaryota
- Kingdom: Animalia
- Phylum: Arthropoda
- Subphylum: Chelicerata
- Class: Arachnida
- Family: Eriophyidae
- Genus: Aceria
- Species: A. elongata

Binomial name
- Aceria elongata Hodgkiss, 1913

Synonyms
- Erineum roseum, Eriophyes regulus, Eriophyes elongatus

= Aceria elongata =

Species of mite

Aceria elongata, the crimson erineum mite, is a species of eriophyid mite. This microscopic organism induces erineum galls on the upper leaf surfaces of sugar maple, and is known from the east coast of United States and Canada.

== Description of the gall ==
These galls begin as pale greenish patches which develop into a rich red-purple colour as the season progresses, peaking in concentration in the summer. These patches are composed of minuscule papillae containing a red fluid.

At higher densities, this gall mite can cause leaves to become distorted and drop early. However, the damage is not significant enough to warrant control.

The galls produced by this mite are very similar in appearance to those caused by Aceria calaceris. They can be reliably distinguished by range and host plant—A. calaceris forms galls on Rocky Mountain maple primarily, and is only found in the west of North America.

== Description and life history of the mites ==
Aceria elongata mites have two alternating generations per year. They overwinter as deutogynes, and produce a protogyne generation during the summer.

These mites are microscopic and worm-like in appearance. Female-form protogynes are described to be 216 μm in length and yellow-white. Deutogynes lack opisthosomal microtubercles present in the protogynous generations.
