= Aceria iteina =

Scientific classification
- Kingdom: Animalia
- Phylum: Arthropoda
- Subphylum: Chelicerata
- Class: Arachnida
- Family: Eriophyidae
- Genus: Aceria
- Species: A. iteina

Binomial name
- Aceria iteina (Nalepa, 1925)

Synonyms
- Aceria iteinus Eriophyes iteina (Nalepa, 1925)

Species of mite

Aceria iteina is a species of mite which causes galls on the leaves of sallows (Salix species) and their hybrids. It was first described by Alfred Nalepa in 1925.

== Description of the gall ==
The gall is a green or reddish, toadstool shaped pouch, 2–4 mm high with a narrow neck, protruding on the upper-side of a leaf. On the underside the gall also protrudes and there are mites and hairs inside a narrow slit. The gall has been found on eared willow (Salix aurita), goat willow (Salix caprea), grey willow (Salix cinerea) and their hybrids.

Similar species

Identification of mite galls on Salix species is tentative and need to be verified by an expert. It is possible that A. iteina is one of a number of closely related species with A. salicis on S. caprea

== Distribution ==
The gall has been found in Bosnia and Herzegovina, Germany, Great Britain (England, Scotland and Wales), Hungary, the Netherlands, Norway, Serbia and Sweden.
