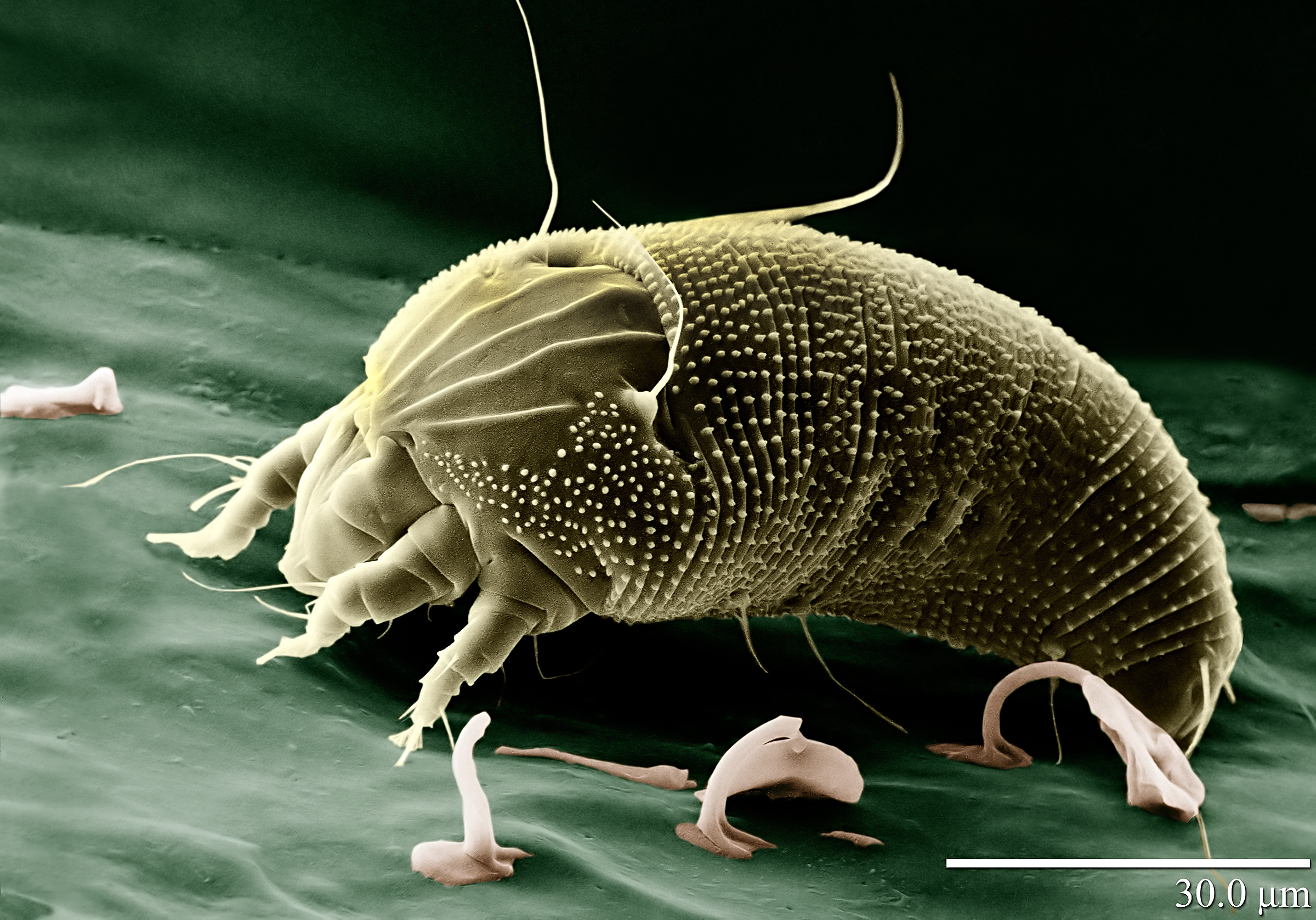
- Aceria anthocoptes magnified 1,400×

Scientific classification
- Domain: Eukaryota
- Kingdom: Animalia
- Phylum: Arthropoda
- Subphylum: Chelicerata
- Class: Arachnida
- Family: Eriophyidae
- Genus: Aceria
- Species: A. anthocoptes

Binomial name
- Aceria anthocoptes (Nalepa, 1892)

= Aceria anthocoptes =

Species of mite

Aceria anthocoptes, also known as the russet mite, rust mite, thistle mite or the Canada thistle mite, is a species of mite that belongs to the family Eriophyidae. It was first described by Alfred Nalepa in 1892.

Aceria anthocoptes can be found on Cirsium arvense, the Canada thistle, and is a good potential biological pest control agent of this invasive weed.

== Description ==
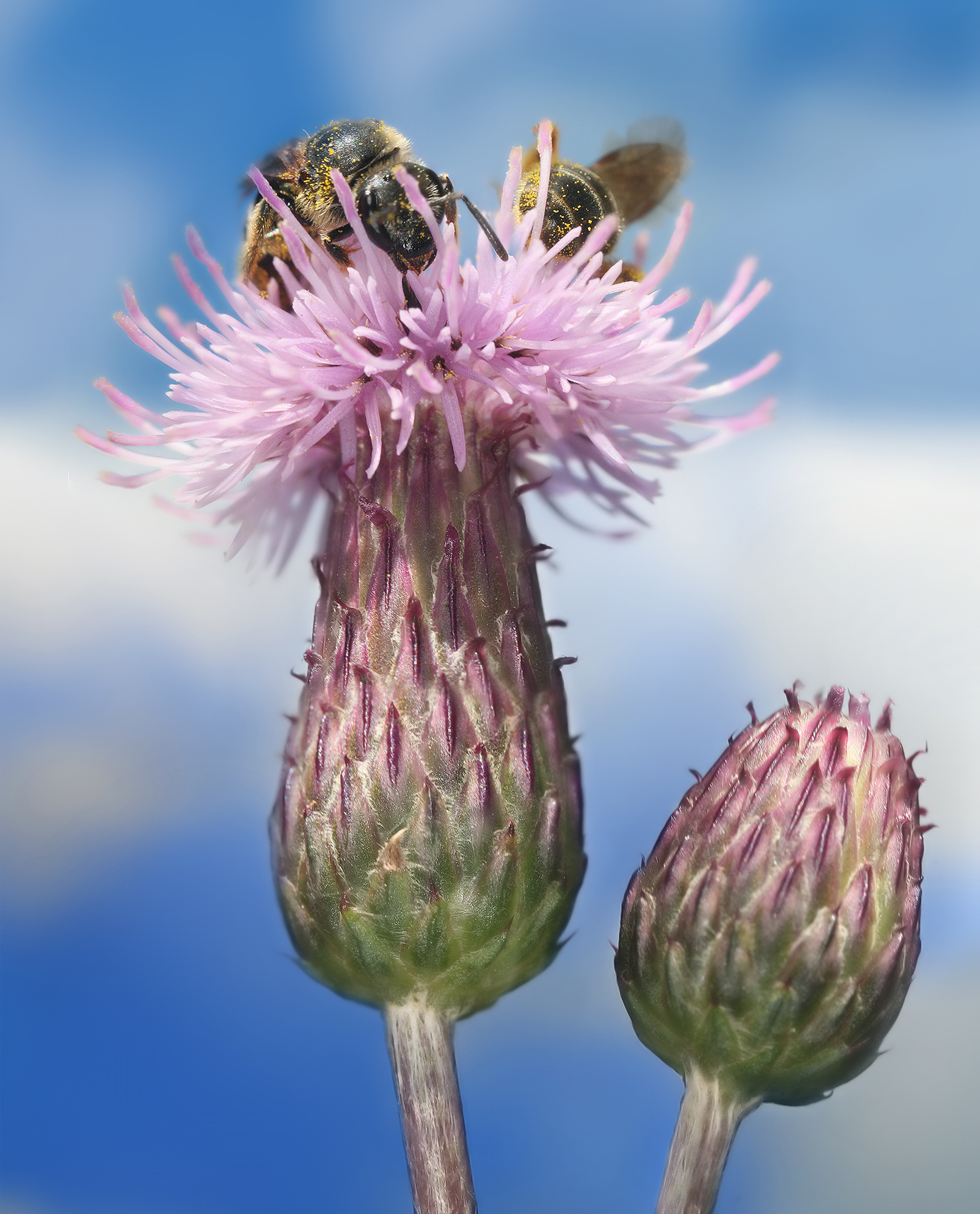
Aceria anthocoptes is considered to be a good potential biological control agent for the invasive weed Canada thistle (Cirsium arvense)

Female specimens have a somewhat fusiform shape, and range in colour. Depending upon the stage of development, both nymphs and adults can appear white, tan, pink, or yellow. They are approximately 170 μm long and 65 μm wide, and are thus almost invisible to the naked eye. Chelicerae are about 20 μm long, and are almost straight.

== Distribution ==
Aceria anthocoptes is a 'free-living' eriophyid. Because of its life history and its morphology, this mite is considered to be a vagrant species.

This mite can be found in a number of European countries and in the United States. As of 2001, it is known to exist in 21 countries. It is the only species of eriophyid mite that has been found on Cirsium arvense throughout the world.

=== In the United States ===
This species is found in the following states:

- California
- Colorado
- Delaware
- Kansas
- Maryland
- Minnesota
- Montana
- Nebraska
- North Dakota
- Oregon
- Pennsylvania
- South Dakota
- Virginia
- Washington
- West Virginia
- Wyoming

== Behavior and life cycle ==
These mites produce multiple generations each year, and probably overwinter on root or the root buds.

This mite normally spends the winter as fertilized female adults, remaining under bud scales of the thistle. They emerge in the spring. They continuously reproduce during times other than winter, creating a new generation every two to three weeks. Aceria anthocoptes mite feeds by sucking the contents of the leaf cells.

== Use as a biological control agent ==
Aceria anthocoptes is considered to be a good potential biological control agent for Cirsium arvense, the Canada thistle. It damages both the epidermal cells and deeper mesophyll layers, on both the upper and lower surfaces of this invasive weed. The result is visible deformation and folding of the leaf blade, with a curling of the leaf edges. The leaves become russeted and bronzed, and gradually dry out.
