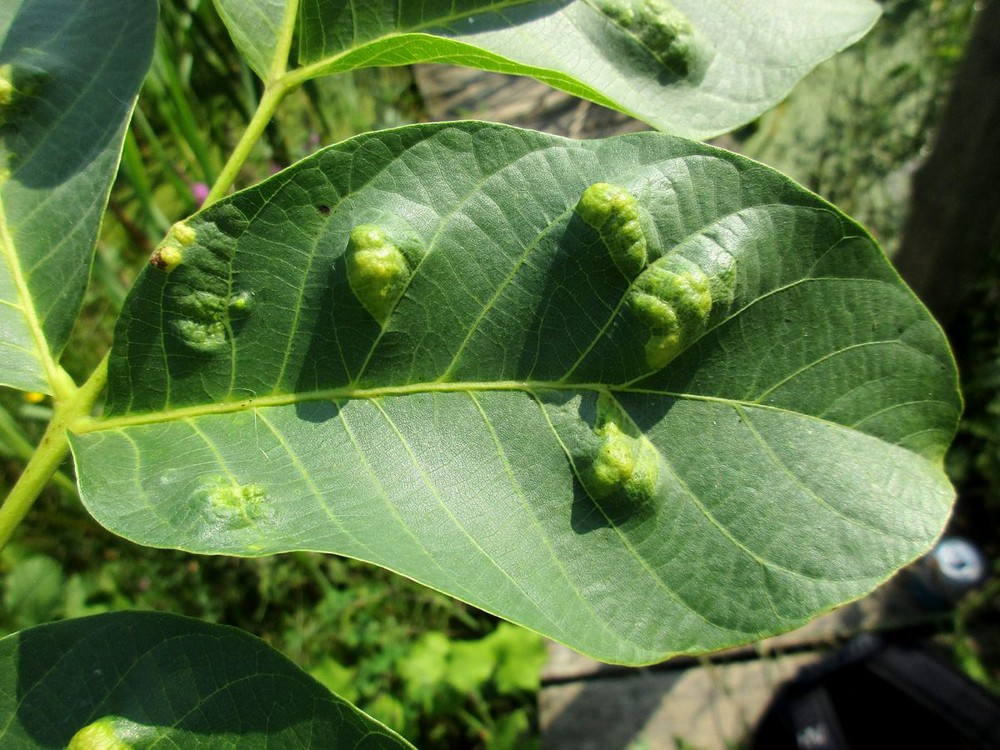

Scientific classification
- Kingdom: Animalia
- Phylum: Arthropoda
- Subphylum: Chelicerata
- Class: Arachnida
- Family: Eriophyidae
- Genus: Aceria
- Species: A. erinea

Binomial name
- Aceria erinea (Nalepa, 1891)

Synonyms
- Eriophyes erineus; E. tristriatus var erinea

= Aceria erinea =

Species of mite

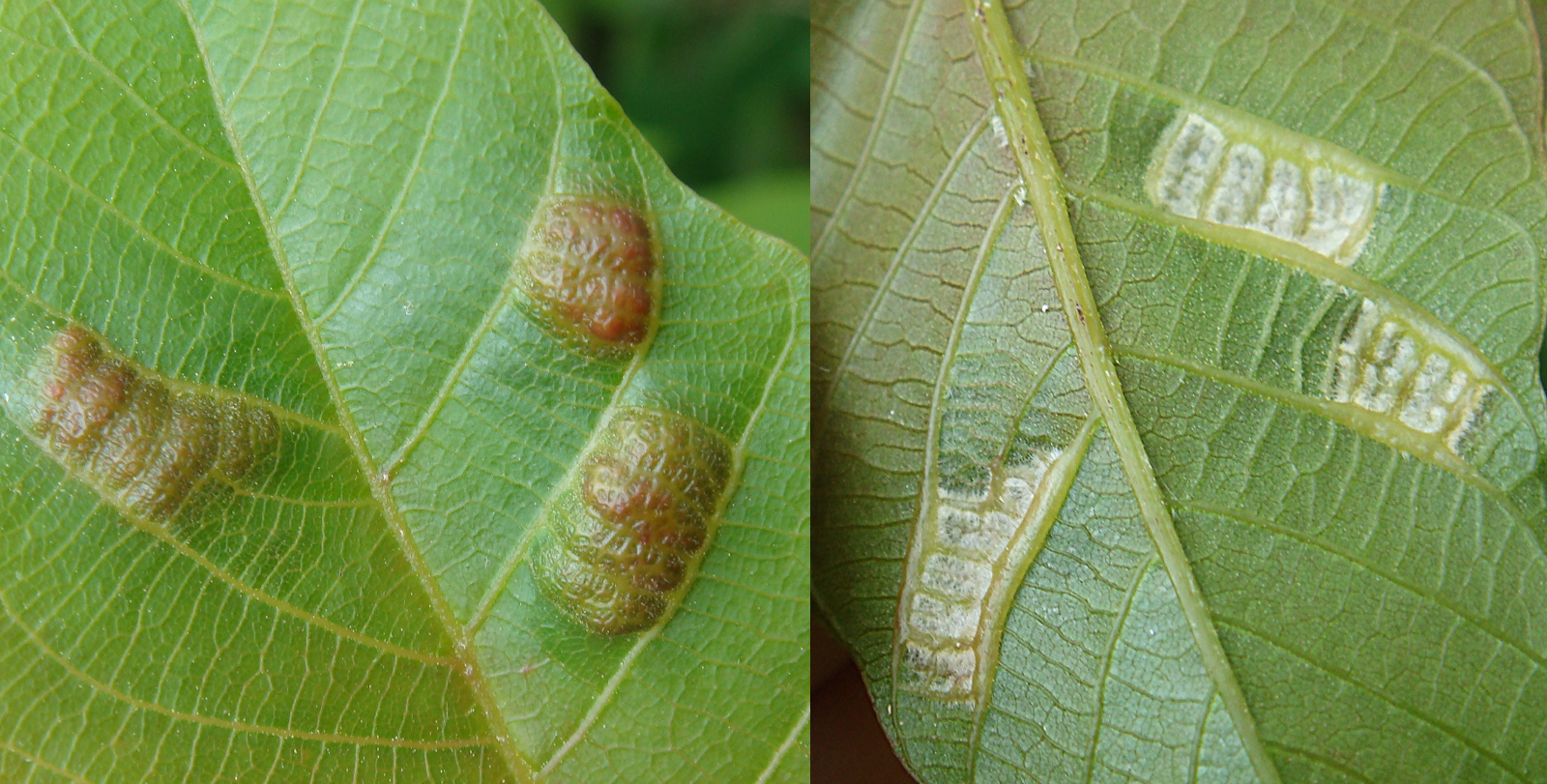
The top side view (left) and underside view (right) of a leaf with the gall.

Aceria erinea is a species of mite which causes galls on the leaves of walnut (Juglans regia). It was first described by Alfred Nalepa in 1891.
