= Aceria vitalbae =

Scientific classification
- Kingdom: Animalia
- Phylum: Arthropoda
- Subphylum: Chelicerata
- Class: Arachnida
- Family: Eriophyidae
- Genus: Aceria
- Species: A. vitalbae

Binomial name
- Aceria vitalbae (Canestrini, 1892)

Synonyms
- Phytoptus vitalbae Canestrini, 1892

Species of mite

Aceria vitalbae is a herbivorous gall-forming mite species that feeds on Clematis vitalba. It is a European native found naturally from France to Romania and has been purposefully introduced into New Zealand as a biological control agent to control Clematis vitalba, where it is a widespread weed.

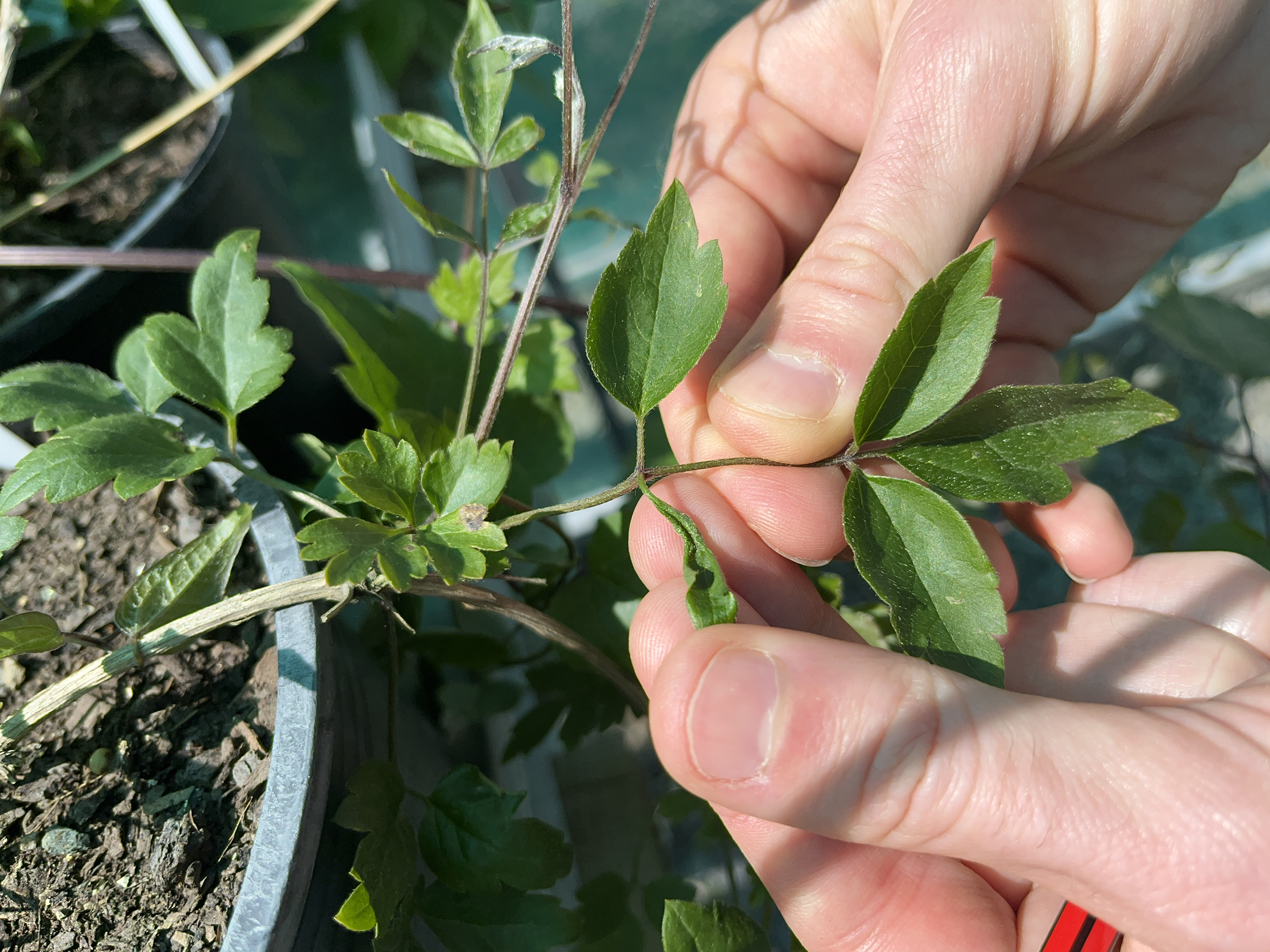
The damage to the leaf of a potted old man's beard vine caused by feeding by Aceria vitalbae mites, in the biocontrol rearing facility of Manaaki Whenua—Landcare Research in Lincoln, New Zealand
