= Coleotechnites bacchariella =

Scientific classification
- Domain: Eukaryota
- Kingdom: Animalia
- Phylum: Arthropoda
- Class: Insecta
- Order: Lepidoptera
- Family: Gelechiidae
- Genus: Coleotechnites
- Species: C. bacchariella

Binomial name
- Coleotechnites bacchariella (Keifer, 1927)

Synonyms
- Recurvaria bacchariella Keifer, 1927

Species of moth

Coleotechnites bacchariella, the coyote brush twig borer, is a moth of the family Gelechiidae. It is found in the United States, where it has been recorded from California.

The larvae bore the twigs of Baccharis pilularis.
