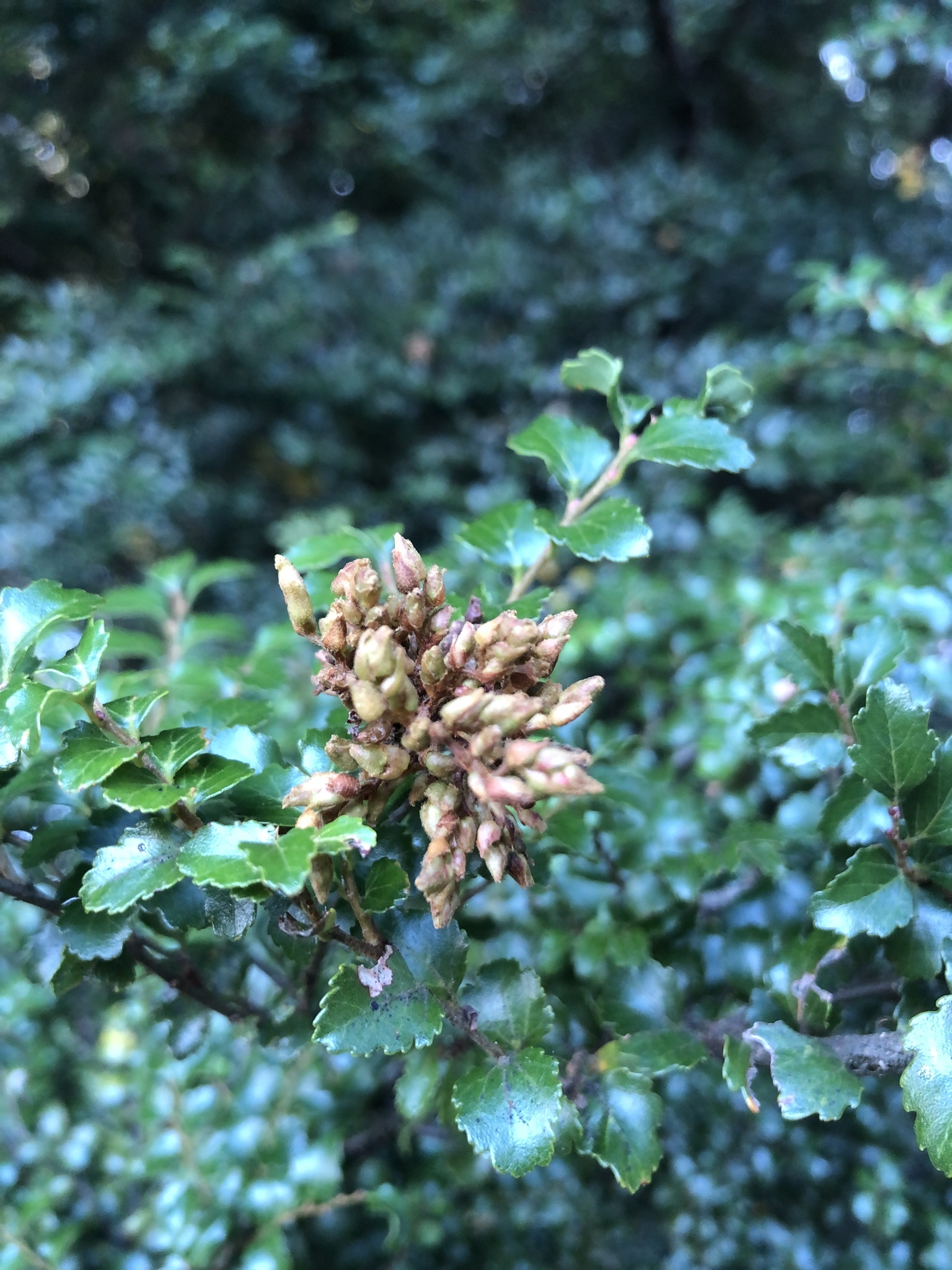
- Cymoptus waltheri in Ohakune

Scientific classification
- Kingdom: Animalia
- Phylum: Arthropoda
- Subphylum: Chelicerata
- Class: Arachnida
- Family: Eriophyidae
- Genus: Aceria
- Species: A. waltheri

Binomial name
- Aceria waltheri (Keifer, 1939)

= Aceria waltheri =

Species of mite

Aceria waltheri, possible synonym Cymoptus waltheri, is a species of broom mite, affecting Nothofagus menziesii trees. It is sometimes called Beech Witches Broom Mite.

== Taxonomy ==
The taxonomic status of the species was unclear, as of January 2024, with sources treating Cymoptus waltheri as either a synonym of Aceria waltheri, or as an accepted species.

== Description ==
Aceria waltheri is a very small mite that makes a tan broom on silver beech trees.

== Range ==
It is native to New Zealand.
