= Aceria cynodoniensis =

Scientific classification
- Kingdom: Animalia
- Phylum: Arthropoda
- Subphylum: Chelicerata
- Class: Arachnida
- Family: Eriophyidae
- Genus: Aceria
- Species: A. cynodoniensis

Binomial name
- Aceria cynodoniensis Sayed, 1946

Synonyms
- Eriophyes cynodoniensis

Species of mite

Aceria cynodoniensis, the bermudagrass mite or couchgrass mite, is widely distributed, but only infests bermudagrass (Cynodon dactylon) and its hybrids. It lives and develops under the leaf sheaths of its host plant. Infestations of the mite can cause destructive damage to bermudagrass turf and it is often regarded as a harmful pest.

It was first described in 1946 by M. T. Sayed.

== Distribution ==
Originally described from Egypt, it has been also reported from southern parts of Europe, other parts of Africa, North- and Central America and Australia. In North America it was first recorded in 1959 in Arizona and is now mainly found in southern States.

== Biology ==
The adult female of A. cynodoniensis ranges from 165 to 210 μm in length and has a worm-like body with 2 pairs of legs. The female lays eggs inside the leaf sheaths of bermudagrass. Like other eriophyid mites, the species is arrhenotokous, meaning that unfertilized eggs become males and fertilized eggs become females. After hatching, the mite passes through 2 nymphal stages (protonymph and deutonymph) before moulting to the adult stage.

A female mite produces around 50 eggs during its life. These are round and very small, about 60 μm in diameter. They hatch after 2–3 days. The development from egg to adult mite can be completed in 5–6 days but may last up to 2 weeks under unfavourable conditions. Therefore, there are typically multiple generations per year. The mites can tolerate temperatures up to 120 °F [49 °C], but go into diapause during the winter. Over short distances, mites disperse passively by floating through the air, assisted by wind. Over longer distance the mites spread through the transport of infested bermudagrass.

== Damage and management ==
The feeding activities of the mite induces deformations (witch's brooms), stunting, thinning and eventually patches of turf die off. The damage reduces the aesthetic and recreational value of managed bermudagrass. Mite damage increases in dryer years but decreases in wetter years and is usually most severe in spring when new tillers are formed.

Management strategies for bermudagrass mites that rely solely on miticides are ineffective and additional cultural control methods are necessary. These include adequate irrigation of the turf and reduced input of nitrogen fertilizers (0.5 kg N/ha).
