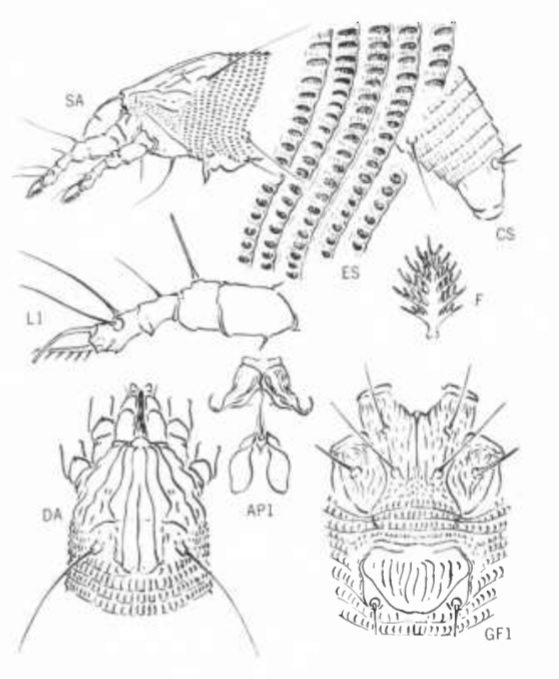
- Diagram by Hartford H Keifer

Scientific classification
- Domain: Eukaryota
- Kingdom: Animalia
- Phylum: Arthropoda
- Subphylum: Chelicerata
- Class: Arachnida
- Family: Eriophyidae
- Genus: Aceria
- Species: A. guerreronis

Binomial name
- Aceria guerreronis Keifer, 1965

= Aceria guerreronis =

Species of mite

Aceria guerreronis, the coconut mite, is an eriophyid mite which infests coconut plantations. It is economically devastating, and can destroy up to 60% of coconut production. The immature nuts are infested and injured by mites feeding in the portion covered by the perianth of the immature nut.

== Description ==
The coconut mite is small, with a length of about 220 micrometres (0.0087 in) and a width of 36 to 52 micrometres (0.0014 to 0.0020 in); this is too small to see with the naked eye. The mite is white and translucent, long and slender, with two pairs of legs. Populations build up rapidly, and the presence of this mite is generally indicated by the damage it does, and confirmed microscopically.

== Distribution ==
Aceria guerreronis was first described by Hartford H Keifer in 1965 from Mexico, but it is unclear whether it originated from the Old or New World. The coconut palm originated in the South Pacific region and spread along the coasts of Asia, and later Africa. It was introduced into the Americas by traders in the sixteenth century, but whether the mite moved with it or arrived in some other way is not known. The coconut palm (Cocos nucifera) is the only known host, apart from a single record in South America of it occurring on Lytocaryum weddellianum, a related species of palm. More recently, it has also been reported on Borassus flabellifer and Syagrus romanzoffiana.

== Life cycle ==
The adult female mite lays eggs on the developing coconut fruit about a month after pollination. The site chosen is under the remnants of the perianth which is no longer pressed so tightly against the fruit at this stage in the fruit's development and that enables the mite to access the area. After the eggs have hatched, the developing larvae thrust their mouthparts into the plant's soft tissues and suck out the juices. The whole developmental cycle takes ten days so numbers of mites can increase rapidly. The mites are probably largely dispersed by wind, but phoresy may also occur, with the mites inadvertently being carried by pollinating insects, rodents or birds, to other palm trees.

== Damage ==
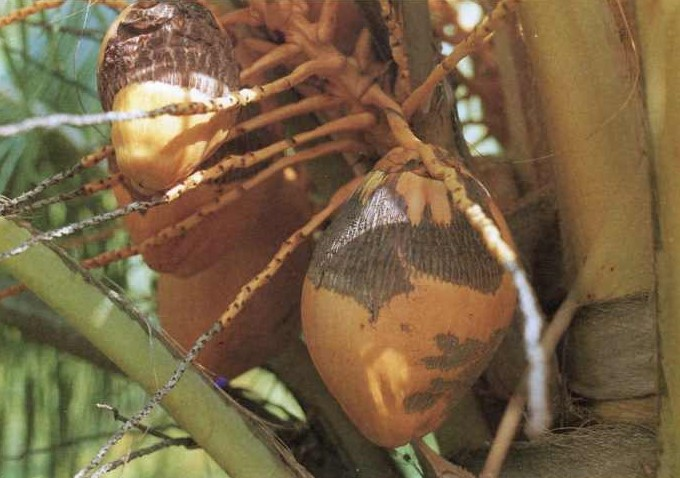
Coconuts injured by Aceria guerreronis

Aceria guerreronis is the only member of its family considered to be a serious pest of coconuts. Coconuts take about twelve months to mature. Damage from the initial infestation under the perianth becomes apparent as the fruit develops and more of its surface becomes visible. The nut develops corky brown, fissured patches of damaged tissue and becomes distorted if the damage is on one side of the fruit and not the other. Further attacks on the same nut can occur but the number of mites present decreases as the nut nears full size, and by the time the nut is harvested, it is usually devoid of mites. Estimates of the amount of economic damage done by the mite range up to 60%.
