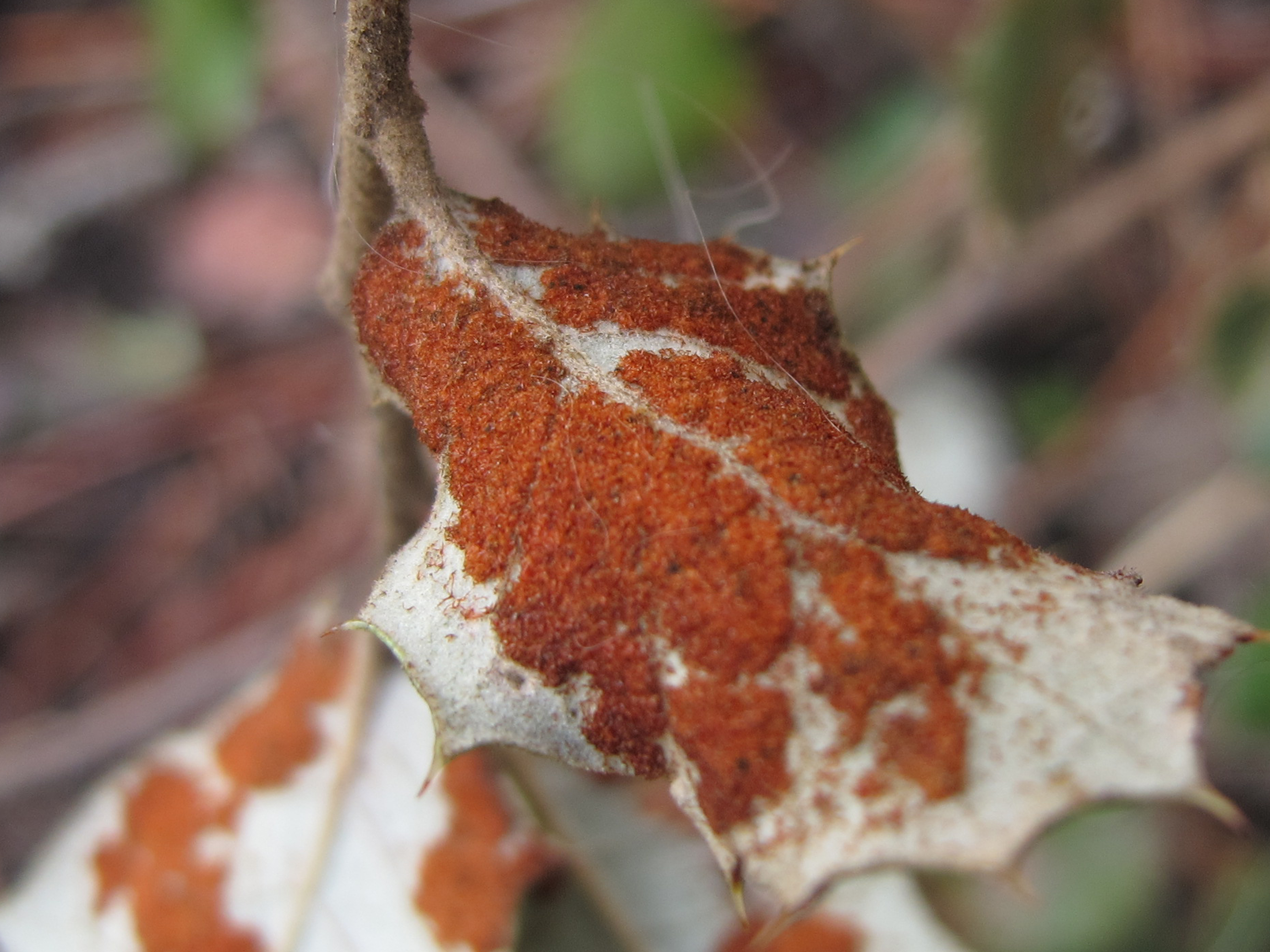
- Underside of leaf showing galls

Scientific classification
- Domain: Eukaryota
- Kingdom: Animalia
- Phylum: Arthropoda
- Subphylum: Chelicerata
- Class: Arachnida
- Family: Eriophyidae
- Genus: Aceria
- Species: A. ilicis

Binomial name
- Aceria ilicis (Canestrini, 1890)

Synonyms
- Erineum ilicinum; Phytoptus ilicis

= Aceria ilicis =

Species of mite

Aceria ilicis is a species of mite that causes growths, known as galls, on the leaves of holm oak (Quercus ilex). It was first described by the Italian naturalist and biologist, Giovanni Canestrini in 1890. It is found in Europe and Turkey.

== Description of the gall ==
Aceria ilicis causes felt-like galls (erinea), which are a patch of glandular hairs, caused by gall mites of the family Eriophyoidea. The bulge is 2–3 mm high on the upperside of the leaf of holm oak (also known as evergreen oak) and the depression below is several mm wide; there are usually several on a leaf. Mites live within the dense mass of tangled hairs. Occasionally the bulge is on the lower side and depression on the upperside.

=== Inquilines ===
It is uncertain, but Aceria trichophila could be an inquiline of Aceria ilicis.

== Distribution ==
Found in the following countries in Europe; Belgium, Croatia, France, Germany, Greece, Italy, the Netherlands, Portugal, Slovenia, Spain, Switzerland and the United Kingdom (England) Also found in Turkey (Asia).

== Gallery ==
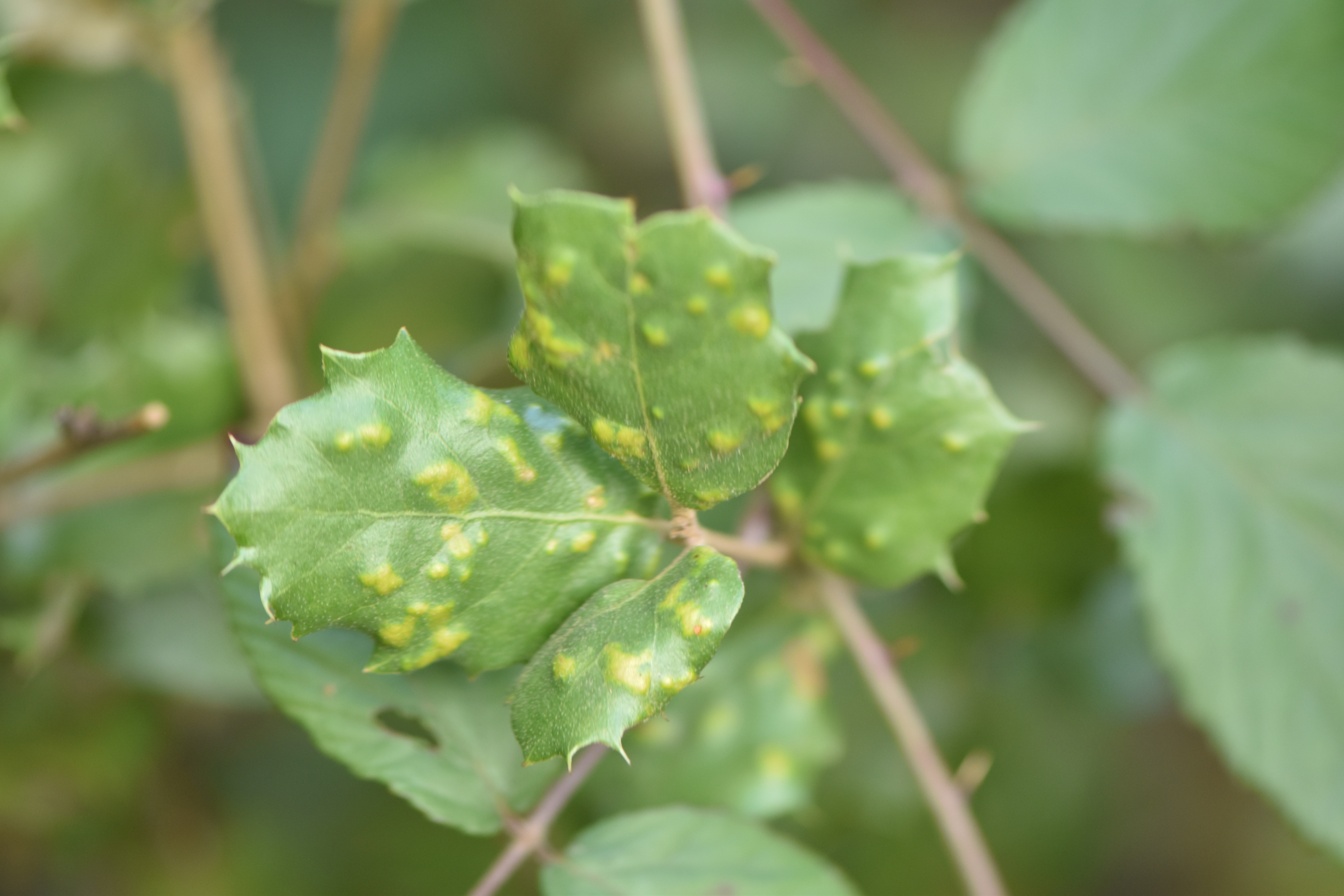

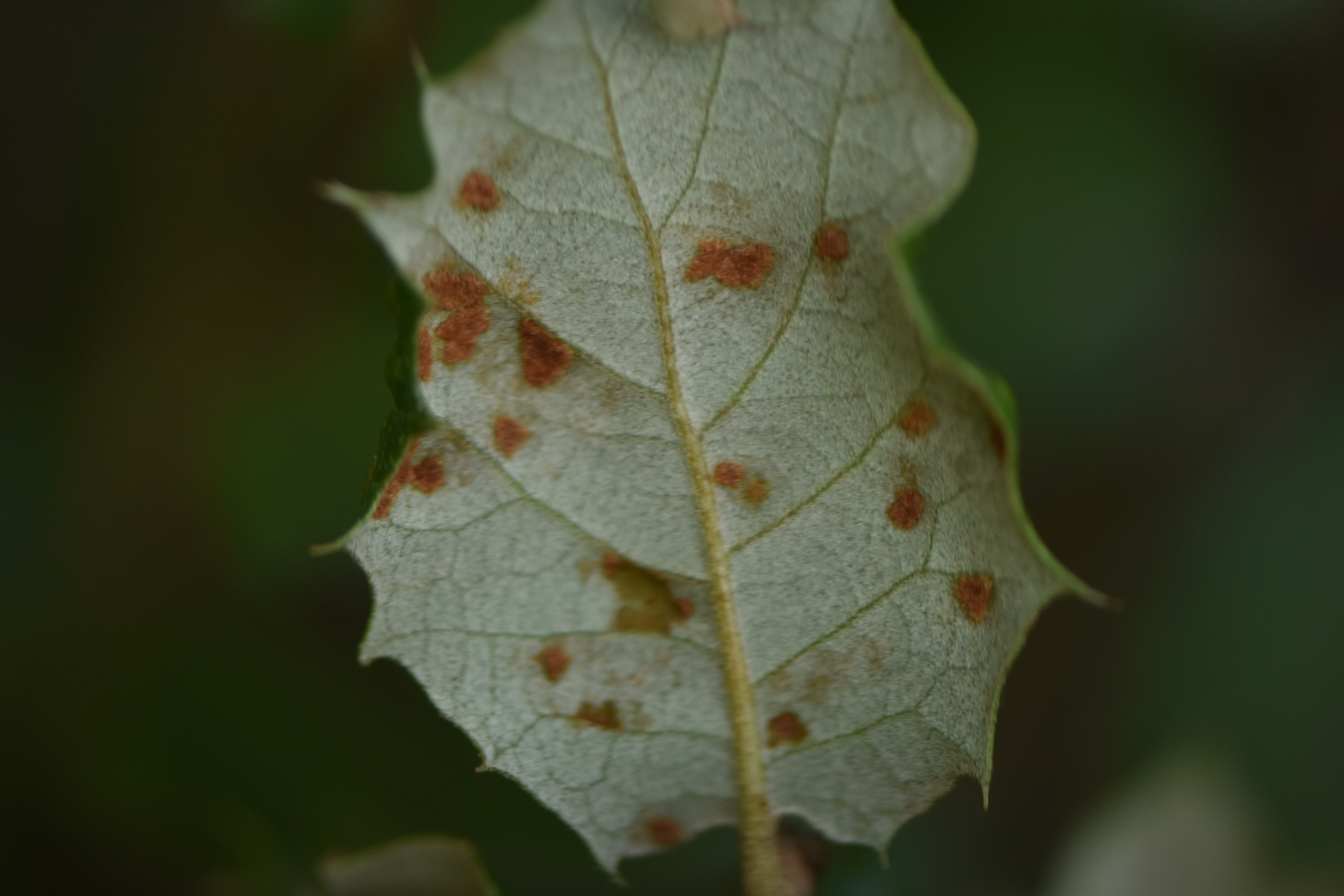
