= Aceria malherbae =

Scientific classification
- Domain: Eukaryota
- Kingdom: Animalia
- Phylum: Arthropoda
- Subphylum: Chelicerata
- Class: Arachnida
- Family: Eriophyidae
- Genus: Aceria
- Species: A. malherbae

Binomial name
- Aceria malherbae Nuzzaci, 1985

Species of mite

Aceria malherbae is a species of gall mite known as the bindweed gall mite. It is used as an agent of biological pest control on invasive species of bindweed, particularly field bindweed (Convolvulus arvensis).

This mite is native to central and southern Europe and northern Africa. It was imported from Greece and released in the US state of Texas in 1989. It is now established in Texas and surrounding states, where it has been known to reduce the density of invasive field bindweed. The adult mite is nearly microscopic and looks like a minute yellow maggot with two pairs of legs. The nymph is similar in appearance to the adult. The adult and the nymph both damage the plant, feeding on the leaves during the warmer seasons when the plant is growing, and on stem and root buds when the plant is dormant over the winter. Galls form on damaged plant tissues, causing leaves to warp and curl and stems and roots to grow out stunted if at all.
