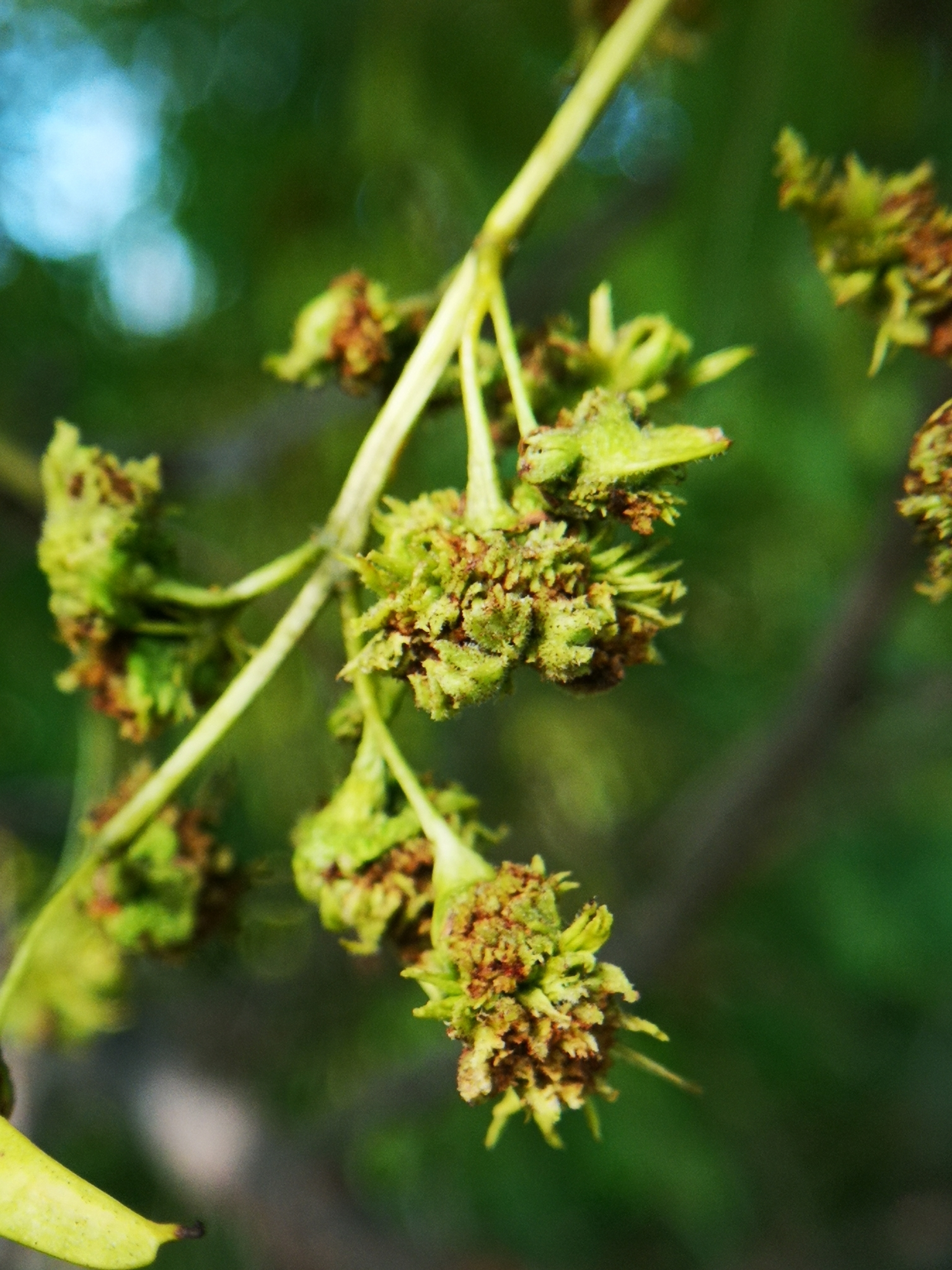
- Young galls

Scientific classification
- Kingdom: Animalia
- Phylum: Arthropoda
- Subphylum: Chelicerata
- Class: Arachnida
- Family: Eriophyidae
- Genus: Aceria
- Species: A. fraxiniflora

Binomial name
- Aceria fraxiniflora (Felt, 1906)

= Aceria fraxiniflora =

Species of mite

Aceria fraxiniflora, the ash flower gall mite, is a species of gall mite that creates galls on ash trees. The male flowers of ash are greatly distorted by the mites, which results in a highly disfigured and disorganized gall that remains yellow or green, and later dries and turns brown. However, there is little evidence that this injury has a substantial impact on the ash plant's health.

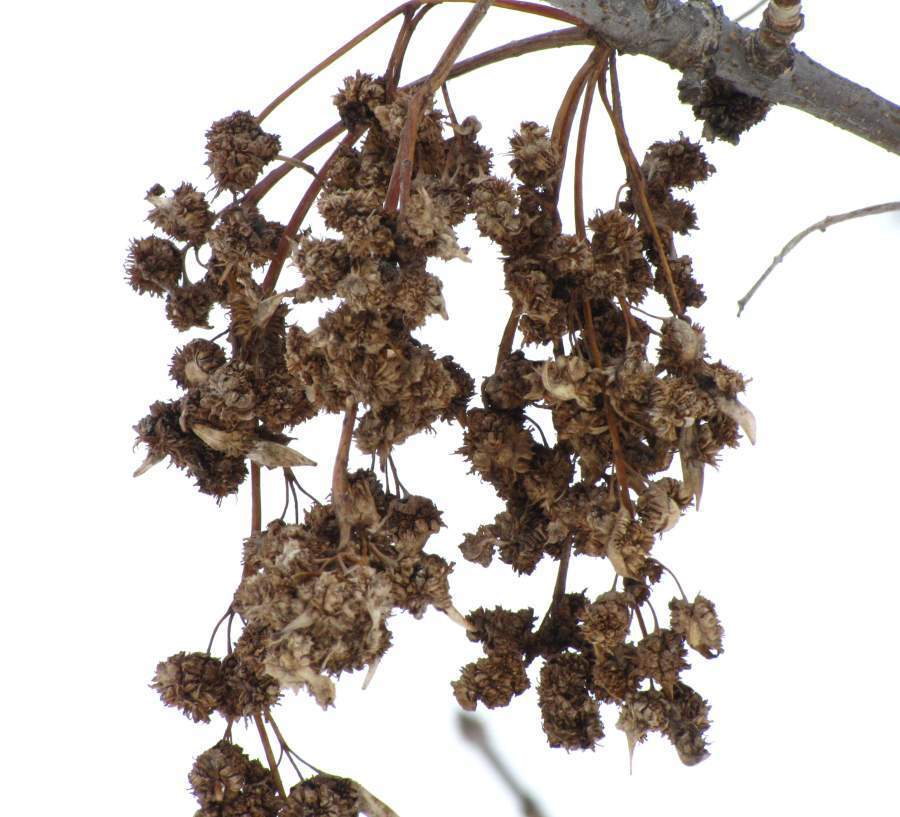
older galls

== Life history ==
Several generations of mites occur during the spring and summer season. During spring, female mites that have survived winter move toward developing male flowers to feed, which leads to the formation of galls. The eggs of the mites are deposited in the developing galls, and the nymphs that hatch out of these eggs live and feed inside the gall tissue. In fall, a generation of female mites develops, which overwinters in bark crevices under bud scales, after mating.

== Biology ==
The adult female stage of ash flower gall mites survives the winter under protected areas such as bud scales on the ash tree. In the spring, with warmer temperatures, the overwintering females start feeding, begin forming galls, and lay their eggs on the newly expanding buds. This results in the development of small pouches in the flower tissue, where the mites continue to grow. As the galls dry up in mid-summer, the mites move to the bud scales for shelter during the following winter season.

== Spread to Europe ==
The ash flower gall mite's first occurrence in Europe was described in 2019 following collection from galled inflorescences and fruit from an introduced cultivar of species of Fraxinus pennsylvanica, green ash, 'Marshall'. The ash flower gall mite was observed in Hungary.
