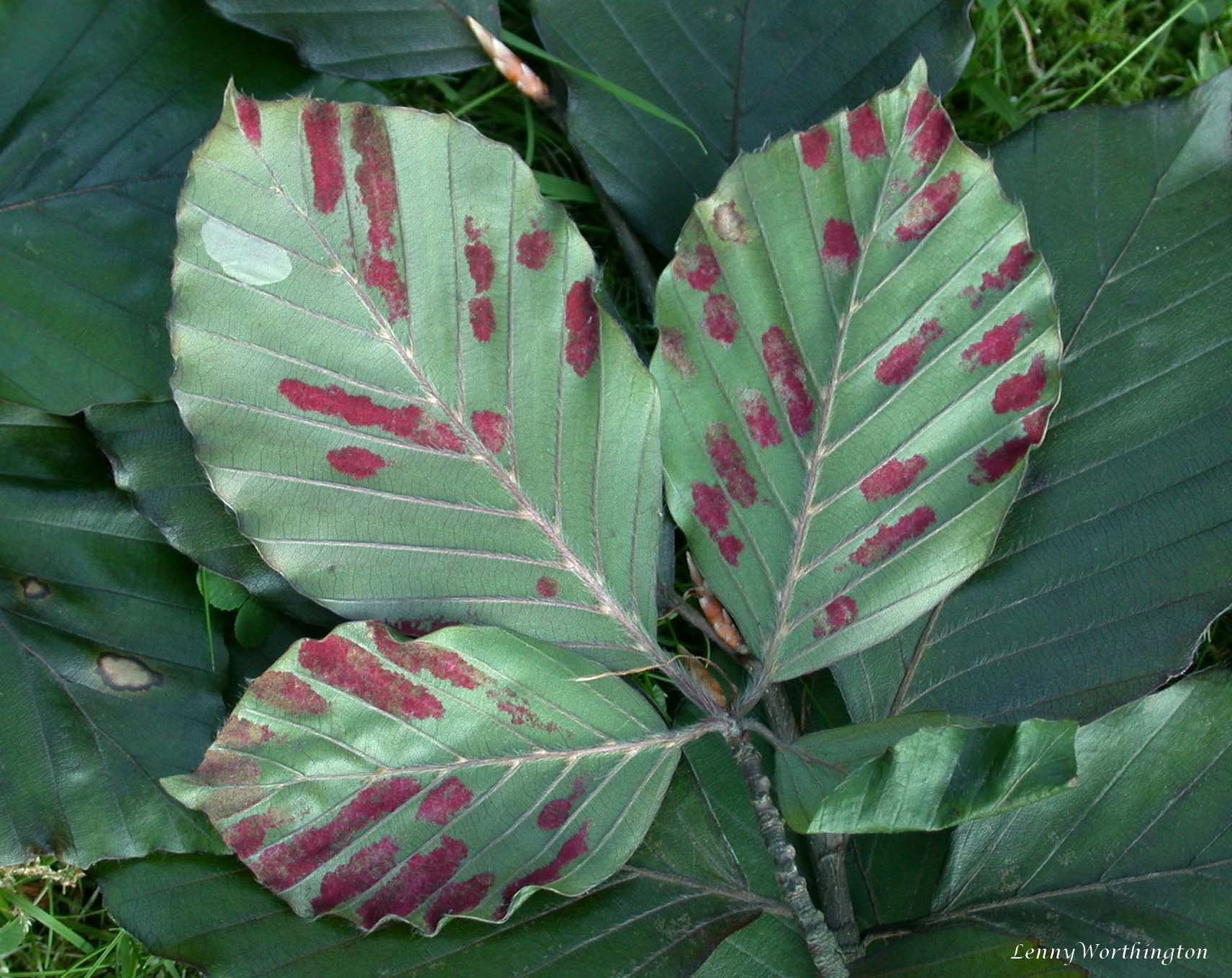

Scientific classification
- Kingdom: Animalia
- Phylum: Arthropoda
- Subphylum: Chelicerata
- Class: Arachnida
- Family: Eriophyidae
- Genus: Aceria
- Species: A. nervisequa

Binomial name
- Aceria nervisequa (Canestrini, 1891)

Synonyms
- List: Phytoptus nervisequa Canestrini, 1891; Eriophyes faginea Nalepa, 1920; Aceria faginea; Artacris faginea; Artacris nervisequa; Cisaberoptus faginea; Cisaberoptus nervisequa; Trichostigma faginea; Trichostigma nervisequa

= Aceria nervisequa =

Species of mite

Aceria nervisequa is a species of mite that belongs to the family Eriophyidae. It is found in Europe and was first described by Giovanni Canestrini in 1891. The mite causes galls on the leaves of beech (Fagus species),

== Description of the gall ==
Aceria nervisequa causes felt-like galls (erinea) (Note: Erineum (erinea) are a patch of glandular hairs, caused by gall mites of the Eriophyoidea, which live among the leaves.) on the underside of the leaves of European beech (Fagus sylvatica), copper beech) (Fagus sylvatica purpurea) and Crimean beech (Fagus × taurica). The erinea are white at first, turning pink and then brown by the autumn while on copper beech the erinea are pink, bright crimson or purple. The mites also cause erinea along the veins on the upper side of the leaf which were initially thought to be a separate species; known as Aceria faginea. The mites spend the winter in bark crevices or in buds.

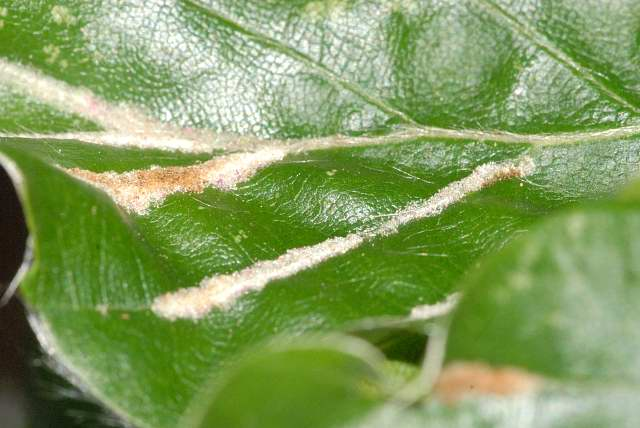

=== Inquilines ===
Aceria maculifer may be an inquiline of A. nervisequa.

== Distribution ==
Found in Europe, including Bosnia and Herzegovina, Croatia, Czech Republic, Denmark, France, Germany, Great Britain (common), Ireland, Italy, Kosovo, Latvia, Luxembourg, Montenegro, Netherlands, North Macedonia, Poland and Serbia.
