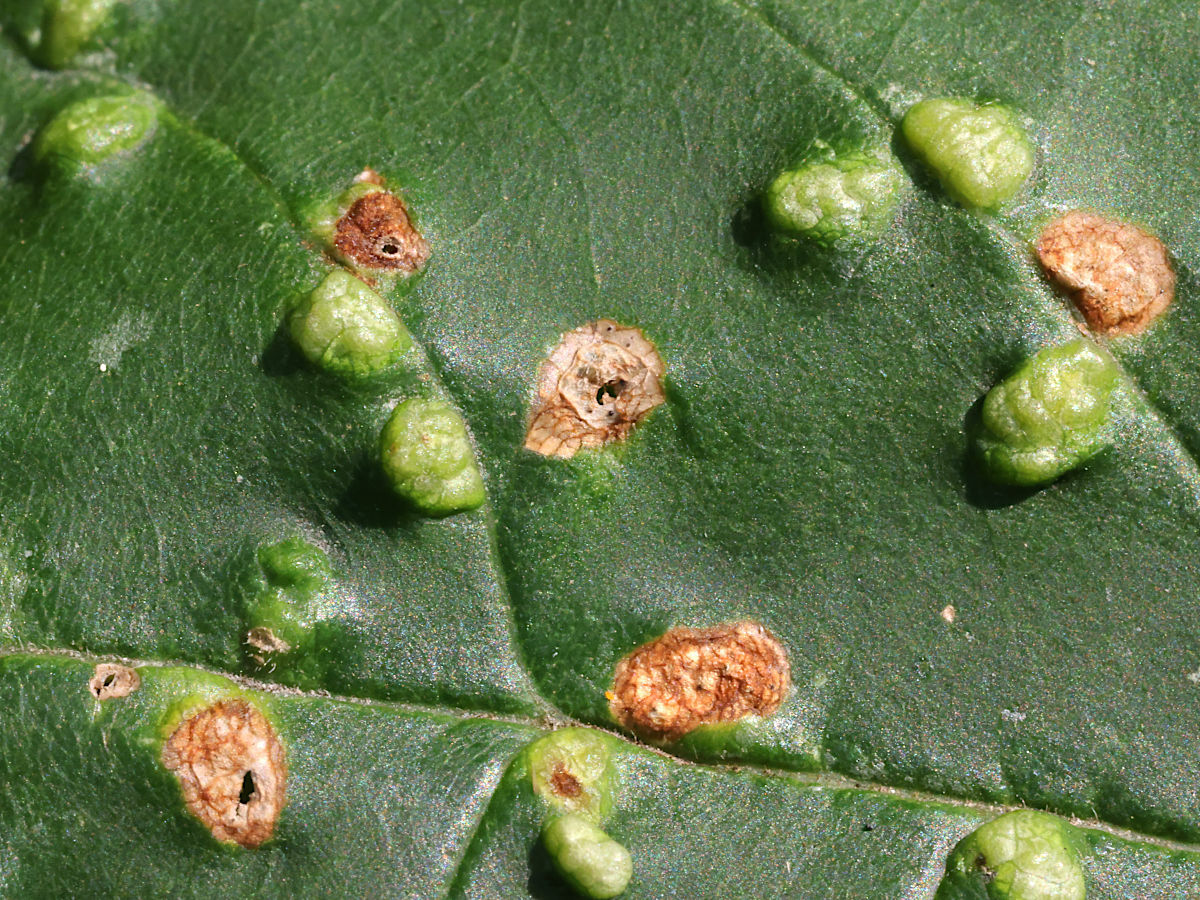
- galls on a leaf, upperside
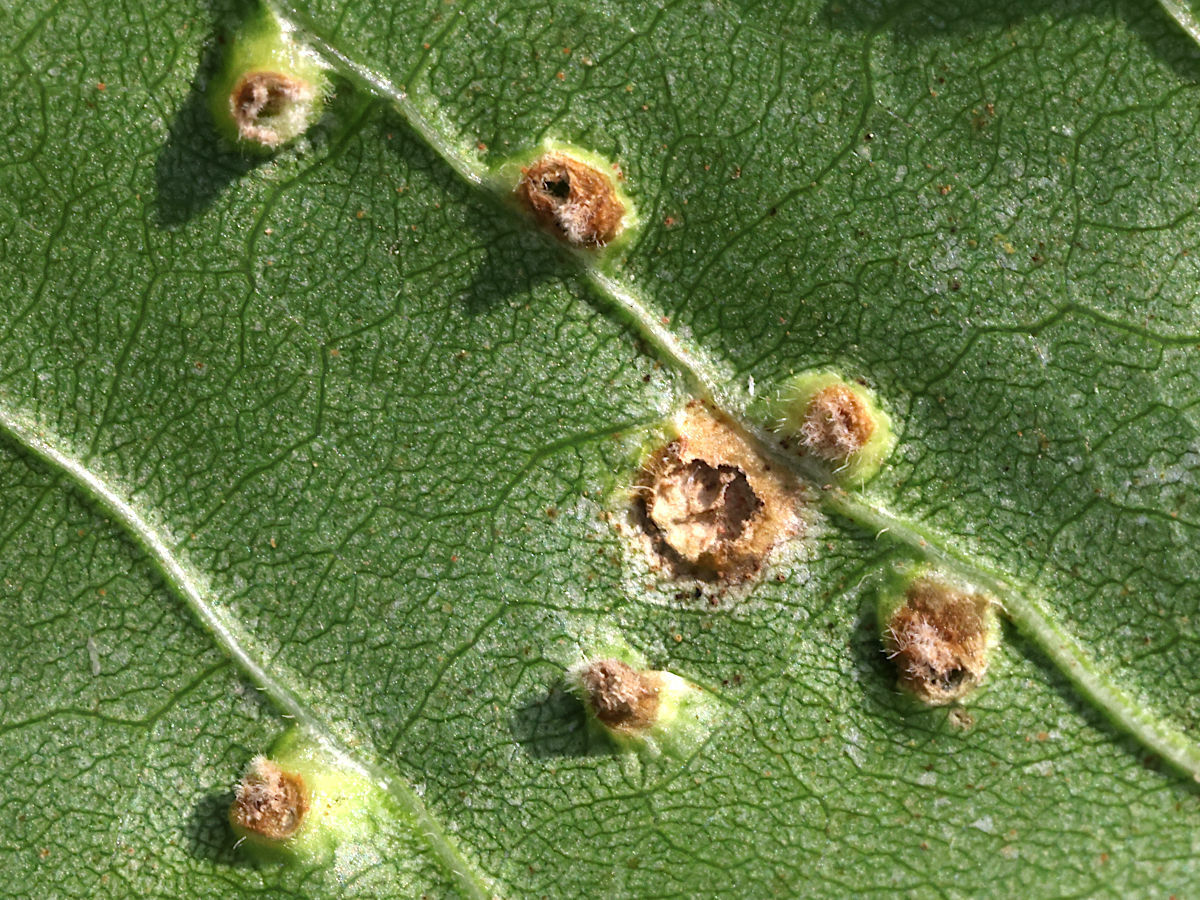
- galls on a leaf, underside

Scientific classification
- Kingdom: Animalia
- Phylum: Arthropoda
- Subphylum: Chelicerata
- Class: Arachnida
- Order: Trombidiformes
- Family: Eriophyidae
- Genus: Aceria
- Species: A. fraxini

Binomial name
- Aceria fraxini (Garman, 1883)

= Aceria fraxini =

Species of mite

Aceria fraxini, the ash bead gall mite, is a species of mites in the family Eriophyidae, the gall mites.

== Ecology ==
Range is North America, including southern Canada and most of the continental United States.

Mites form numerous capsule galls, greenish-yellow in color, between leaf veins of ash trees in the genus Fraxinus, including Fraxinus americana, Fraxinus latifolia, Fraxinus nigra, and Fraxinus pennsylvanica. The mites stay in the galls until late summer when host leaves mature.

The life cycle is a form of alternation of generations. An over-wintering generation consists only of females called deutogynes. The other generation consists of both sexes: females called protogynes as well as males.
