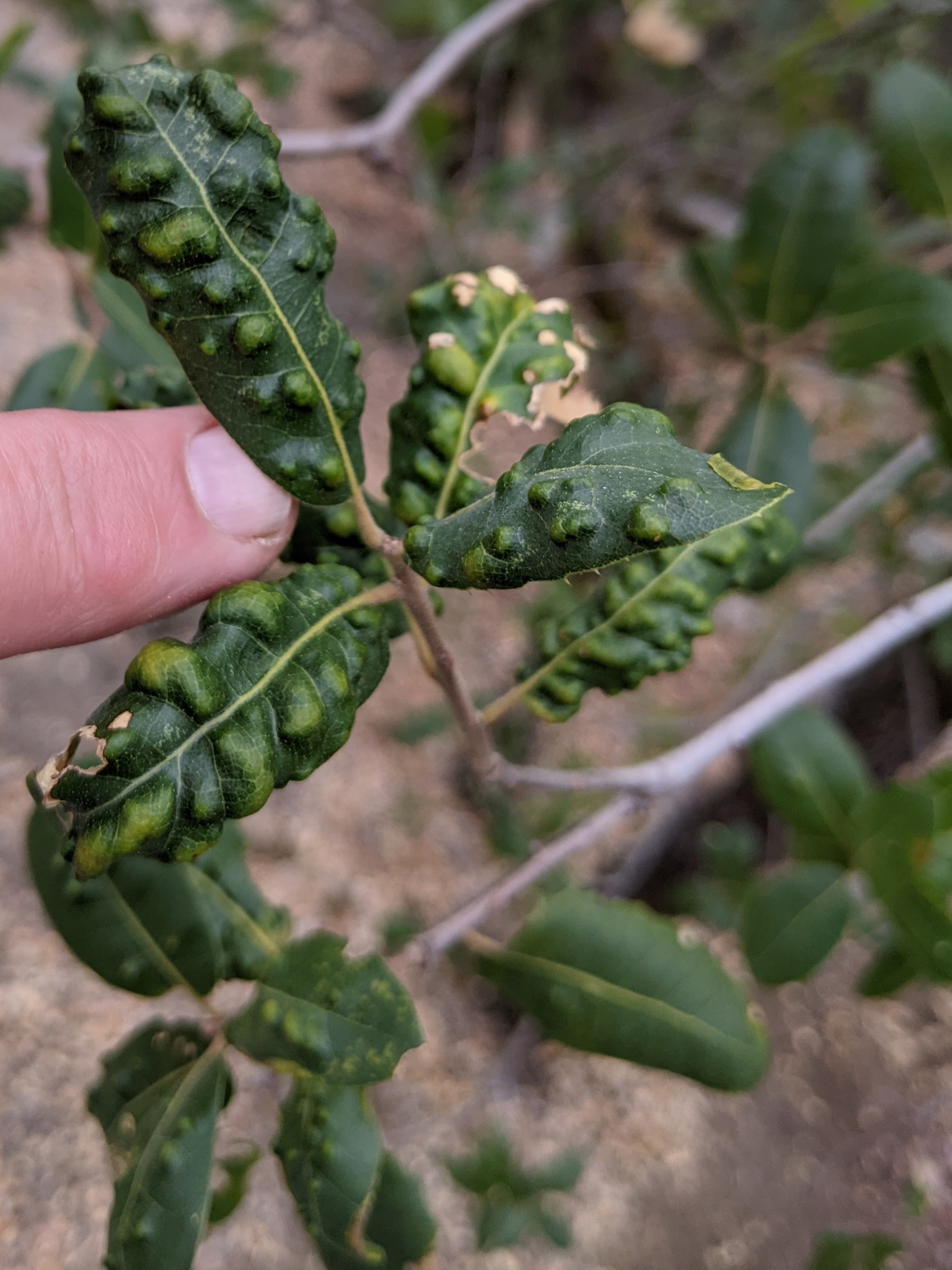
- El Dorado County, 2023

Scientific classification
- Domain: Eukaryota
- Kingdom: Animalia
- Phylum: Arthropoda
- Subphylum: Chelicerata
- Class: Arachnida
- Family: Eriophyidae
- Genus: Aceria
- Species: A. mackiei

Binomial name
- Aceria mackiei (Keifer, 1938)

Synonyms
- Eriophyes mackiei Keifer, 1938

= Aceria mackiei =

North American gall-inducing mite

Aceria mackiei, previously Eriophyes mackiei, the live oak erineum mite, is an abundant eriophyoid mite that produces leaf-blister galls on coast live oak, interior live oak, huckleberry oak, and canyon live oak. This mite's ability to induce galls in oaks of both the black oak group and the intermediate oak group is unique. The distribution of this arthropod is western North America.
