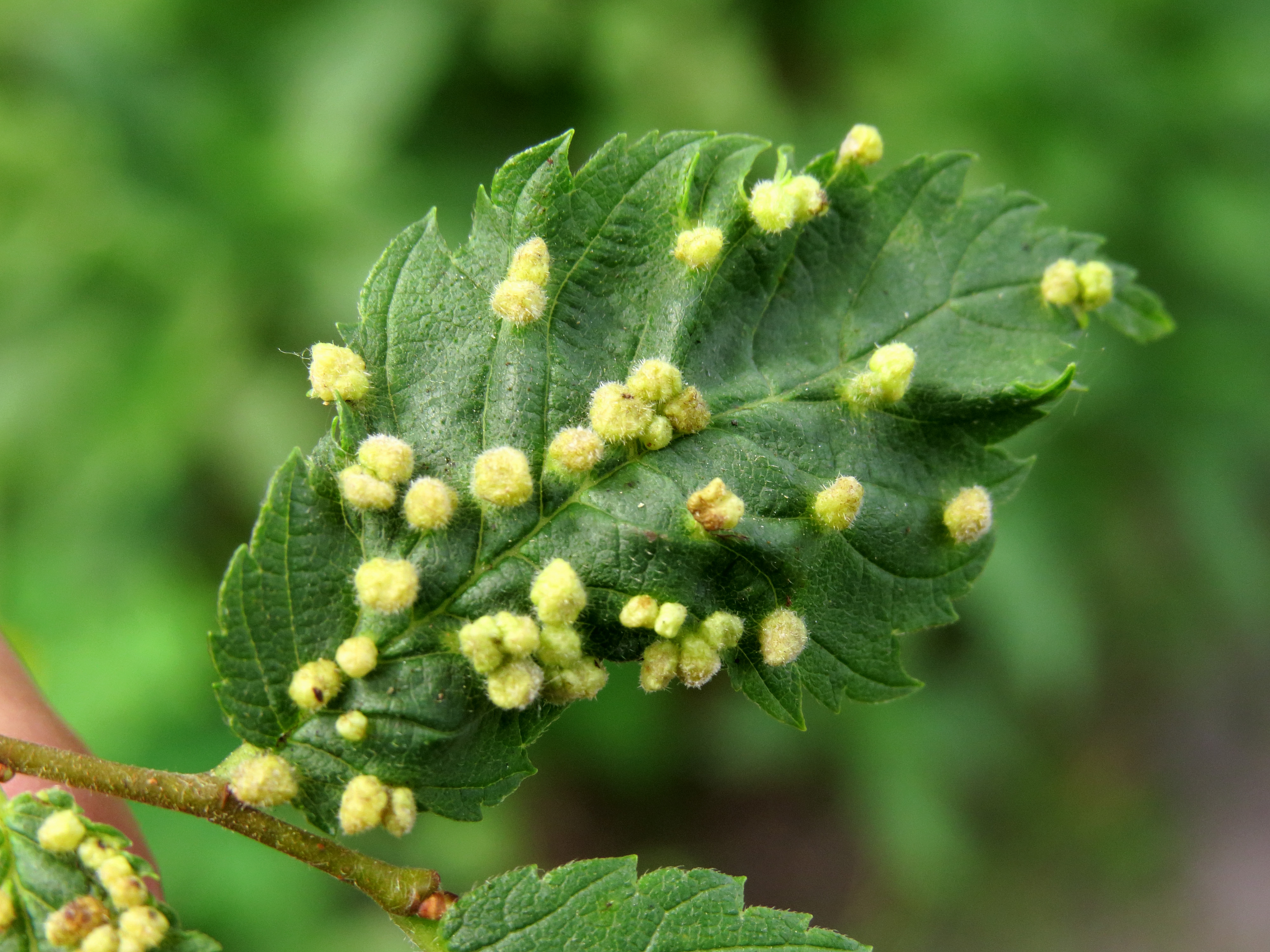
- Galls of Aceria campestricola

Scientific classification
- Kingdom: Animalia
- Phylum: Arthropoda
- Subphylum: Chelicerata
- Class: Arachnida
- Family: Eriophyidae
- Genus: Aceria
- Species: A. campestricola

Binomial name
- Aceria campestricola (Frauenfeld, 1865)

Synonyms
- List: Phytoptus campestricola Frauenfeld, 1865; Phytoptus brevipunctata Nalepa, 1889; Phytoptus ulmi Nalepa, 1890; Phytoptus ulmicola Nalepa, 1909; Aceria brevipunctata; Aceria ulmi; Aceria ulmicola; Artacris brevipunctata; Artacris campestricola; Artacris ulmi; Artacris ulmicola; Cisaberoptus brevipunctata; Cisaberoptus campestricola; Cisaberoptus ulmi; Cisaberoptus ulmicola; Trichostigma brevipunctata; Trichostigma campestricola; Trichostigma ulmi; Trichostigma ulmicola

= Aceria campestricola =

Species of mite

Aceria campestricola, is a species of mite in the family Eriophyidae. The mite causes galls on the leaves of elms (Ulmus species) and was described by Georg Ritter von Frauenfeld in 1865.

== Description ==
The mites pass the winter hidden in bark crevices and in the spring attack the leaves. The gall is a small pimple or pouch, 1–2 mm across, on the blade or the veins. They are rounded above and have a hairy opening below, with or without a conical projection. Galls are greenish-yellow and redden when exposed to sun, they can be numerous and contain mites.

There is some disagreement as to which species is involved in forming the galls. Mite pimples on elms with small leaves, vary in size and some of the large galls have stalked dimples. The small galls have been described as Aceria ulmicola (Napela) and the stalked galls as Aceria brevipunctata.

Galls have been found on the leaves of the following trees; wych elm (Ulmus glabra), Dutch elm Ulmus x hollandica, European white elm (Ulmus laevis), field elm (Ulmus minor).

== Distribution ==
Found in most of Europe and North America.
