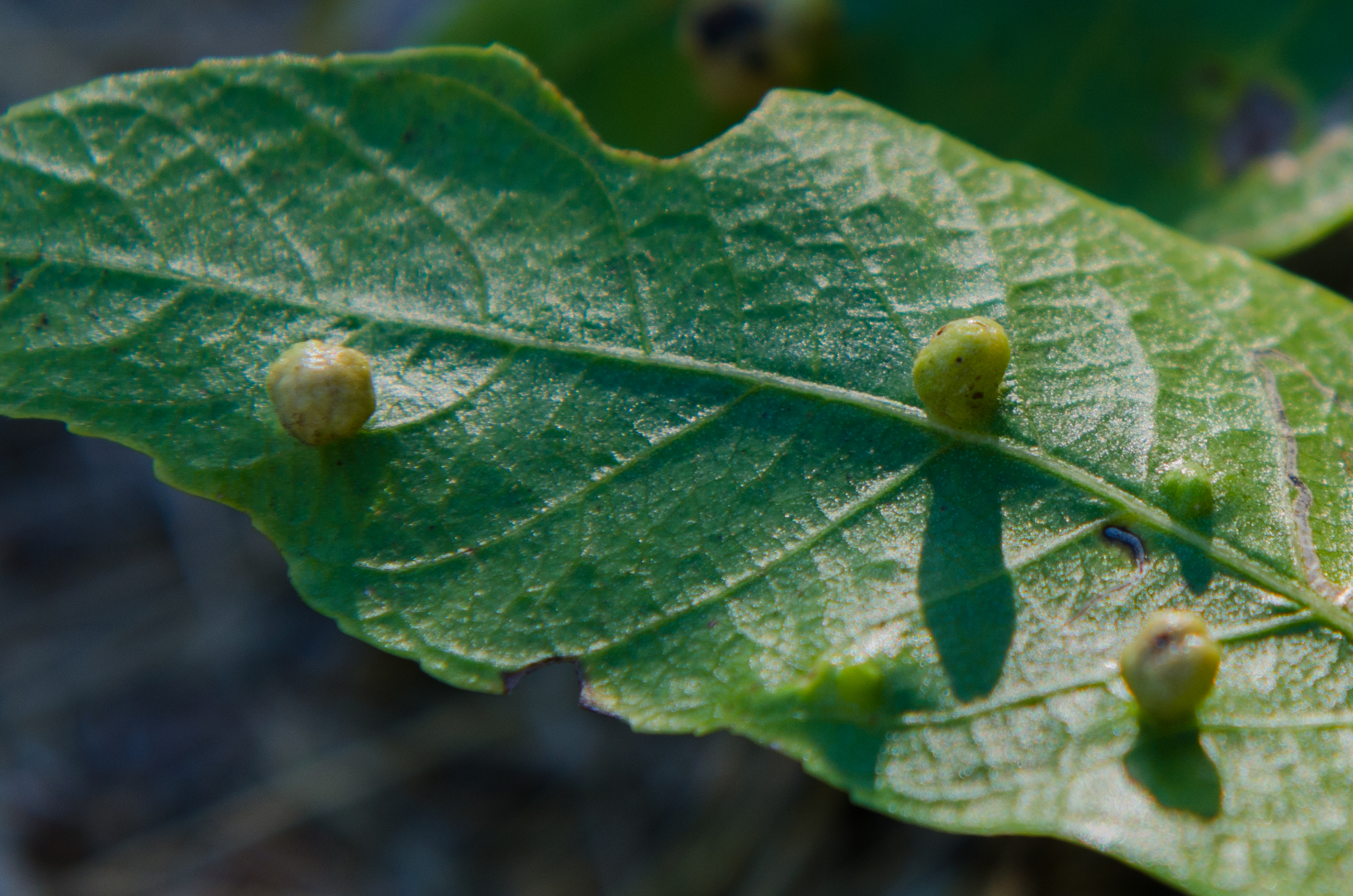
- California, 2013

Scientific classification
- Domain: Eukaryota
- Kingdom: Animalia
- Phylum: Arthropoda
- Subphylum: Chelicerata
- Class: Arachnida
- Family: Eriophyidae
- Genus: Aceria
- Species: A. brachytarsus

Binomial name
- Aceria brachytarsus (Keifer, 1939)

Synonyms
- Eriophyes brachytarsus

= Aceria brachytarsus =

Gall-inducing mite

Aceria brachytarsus, formerly Eriophyes brachytarsus, also known as the pouch gall mite or the walnut purse gall mite, is an eriophyoid mite that produces leaf-pouch galls on various species of walnut trees including Juglans californica. The gall produced by this mite initially looks like a bladder gall. This gall has been observed in California, Iran, and Spain.
