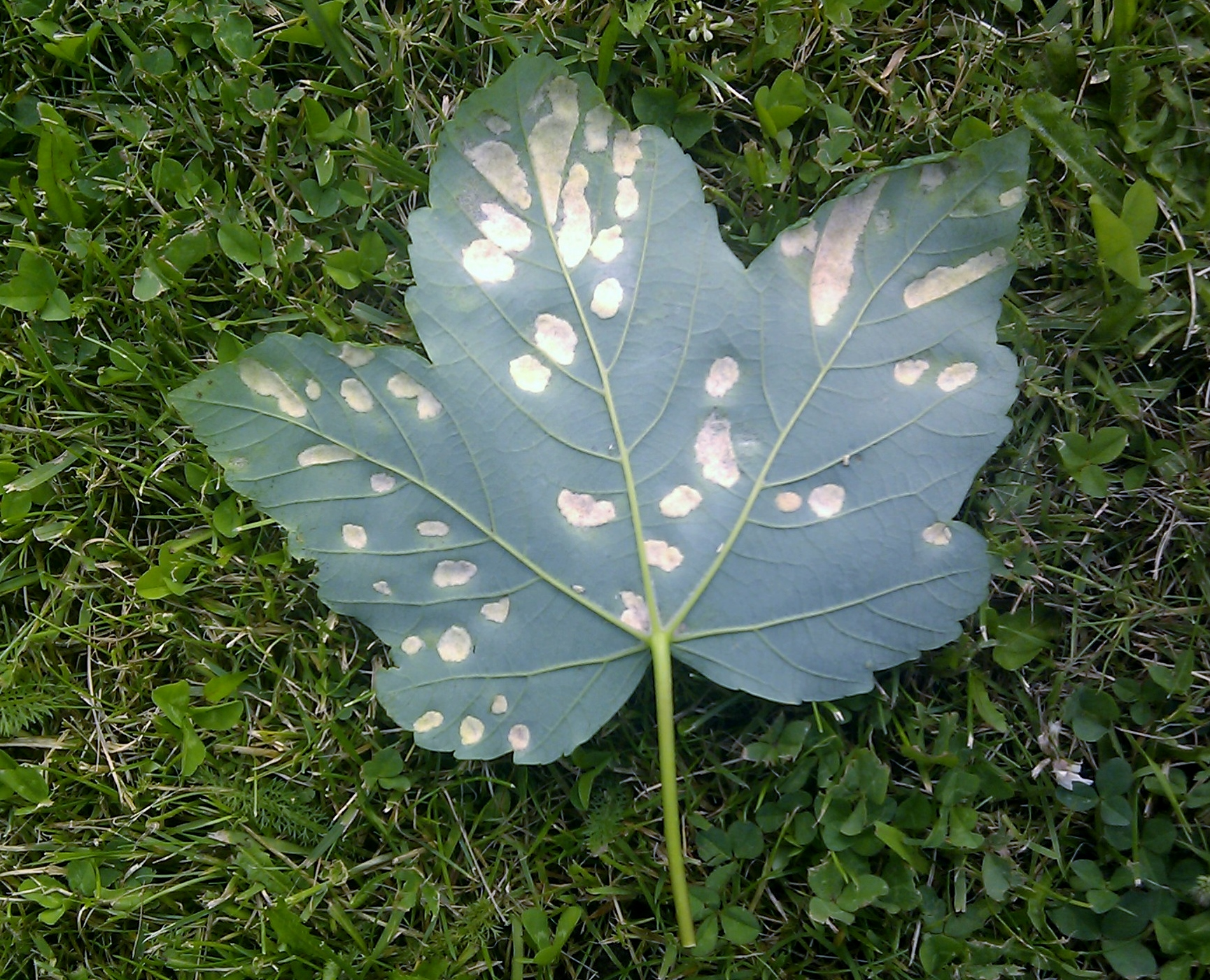
- Underside of sycamore leaf with "felt" gall patches

Scientific classification
- Domain: Eukaryota
- Kingdom: Animalia
- Phylum: Arthropoda
- Subphylum: Chelicerata
- Class: Arachnida
- Family: Eriophyidae
- Genus: Aceria
- Species: A. pseudoplatani

Binomial name
- Aceria pseudoplatani Corti, 1905

Synonyms
- Eriophyes pseudoplatani

= Aceria pseudoplatani =

Species of mite

Aceria pseudoplatani causes the sycamore felt gall that is found on the leaves of sycamores (Acer pseudoplatanus) or Norway maple (Acer platanoides), and is caused by an acarine gall-mite.

== Appearance ==
The gall forms a bulge on the upper epidermis, where the pigment colour is usually light yellow to start with and brown later on in the year. The appearance on the lower epidermis is a concavity with cream- or white- coloured felt-like mat that later turns brown. The bulge is due to the erinae, or hairs, being wider at their top. In purple-leaved varieties of the sycamore, the patches are pink. The size of the felt-like patches is variable, and they may appear from late spring onwards.

== Distribution ==
The sycamore felt gall is quite common, is widespread throughout the United Kingdom and is also recorded in Poland, Belgium, and Germany.
