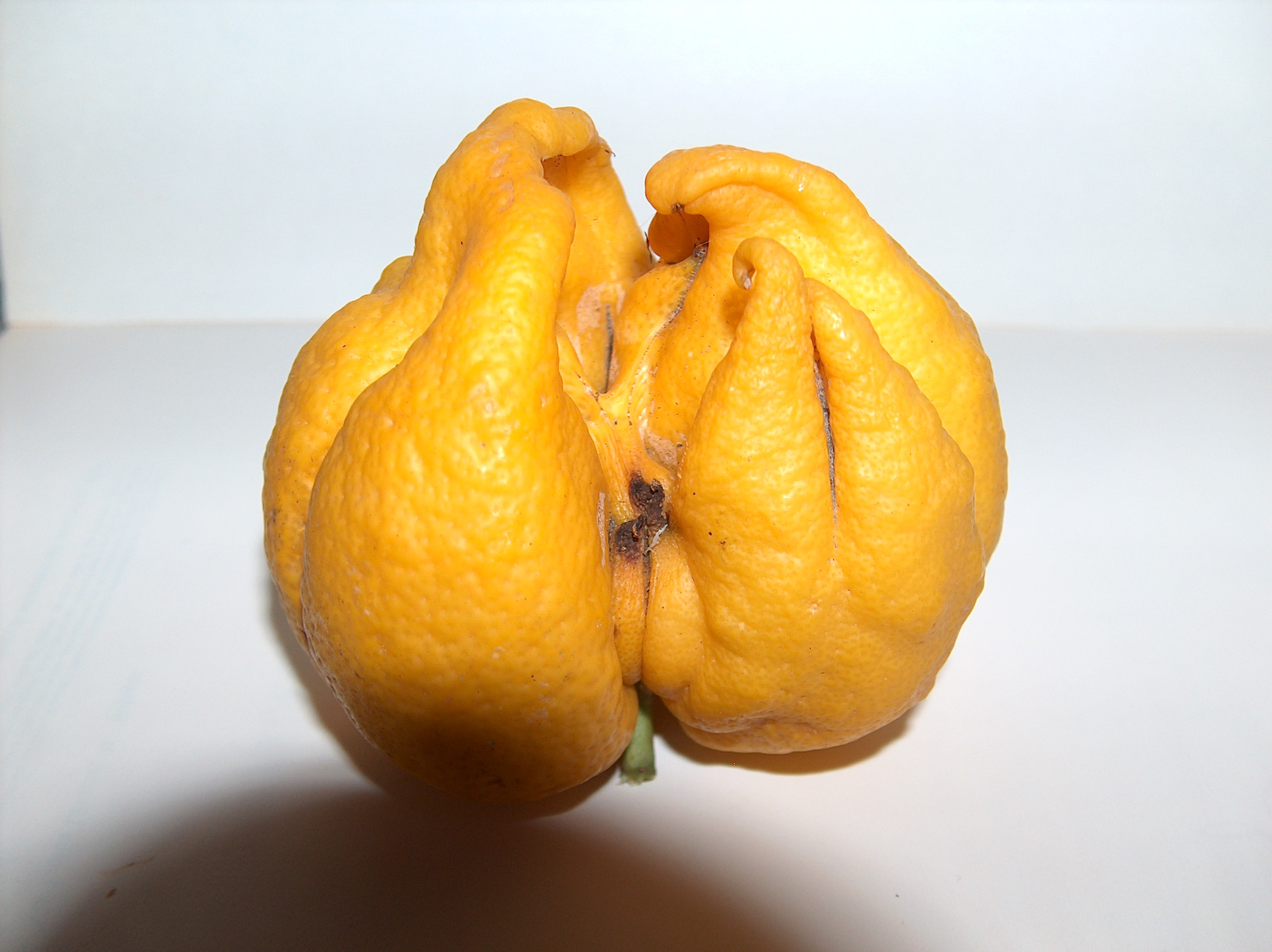
- Lemon infected by A. sheldoni

Scientific classification
- Kingdom: Animalia
- Phylum: Arthropoda
- Subphylum: Chelicerata
- Class: Arachnida
- Order: Trombidiformes
- Family: Eriophyidae
- Genus: Aceria
- Species: A. sheldoni

Binomial name
- Aceria sheldoni Ewing, 1937

Synonyms
- Eriophyes sheldoni Ewing, 1937

= Aceria sheldoni =

Species of mite

Aceria sheldoni, commonly called the citrus bud mite, is a species of mite belonging to the family Eriophyidae. It feeds in leaf- and flower-buds of Citrus spp., causing deformation to leaves, flowers and fruit, and is a worldwide pest of citrus fruit production.

The citrus bud mite is small, only reaching up to 0.16 mm in length, and it is yellowish or pinkish in color. Females lay up to 50 eggs which hatch after 2–5 days. Each generation lasts up to 10 days in the summer and up to 20 days in the winter, but it is active throughout the year. The animal goes through 4 pre-imaginal instars before reaching maturity.

As well as the direct damage caused by this species, the hollows caused in affected fruit encourage infestation by other pests including the citrus mealybug, Planococcus citri and the two-spotted spider mite, Tetranychus urticae.

Studies conducted on California lemon orchards found that oil sprays effectively controlled Aceria Sheldoni populations; however, the treatment did not result in increased fruit yield, nor did it provide measurable economic benefit.
