= Fraxinus bungeana =

Scientific classification
- Kingdom: Plantae
- Clade: Tracheophytes
- Clade: Angiosperms
- Clade: Eudicots
- Clade: Asterids
- Order: Lamiales
- Family: Oleaceae
- Genus: Fraxinus
- Species: F. bungeana

Binomial name
- Fraxinus bungeana A.DC.

Species of plant

Fraxinus bungeana is a species of flowering plant belonging to the family Oleaceae.

It is native to China.
