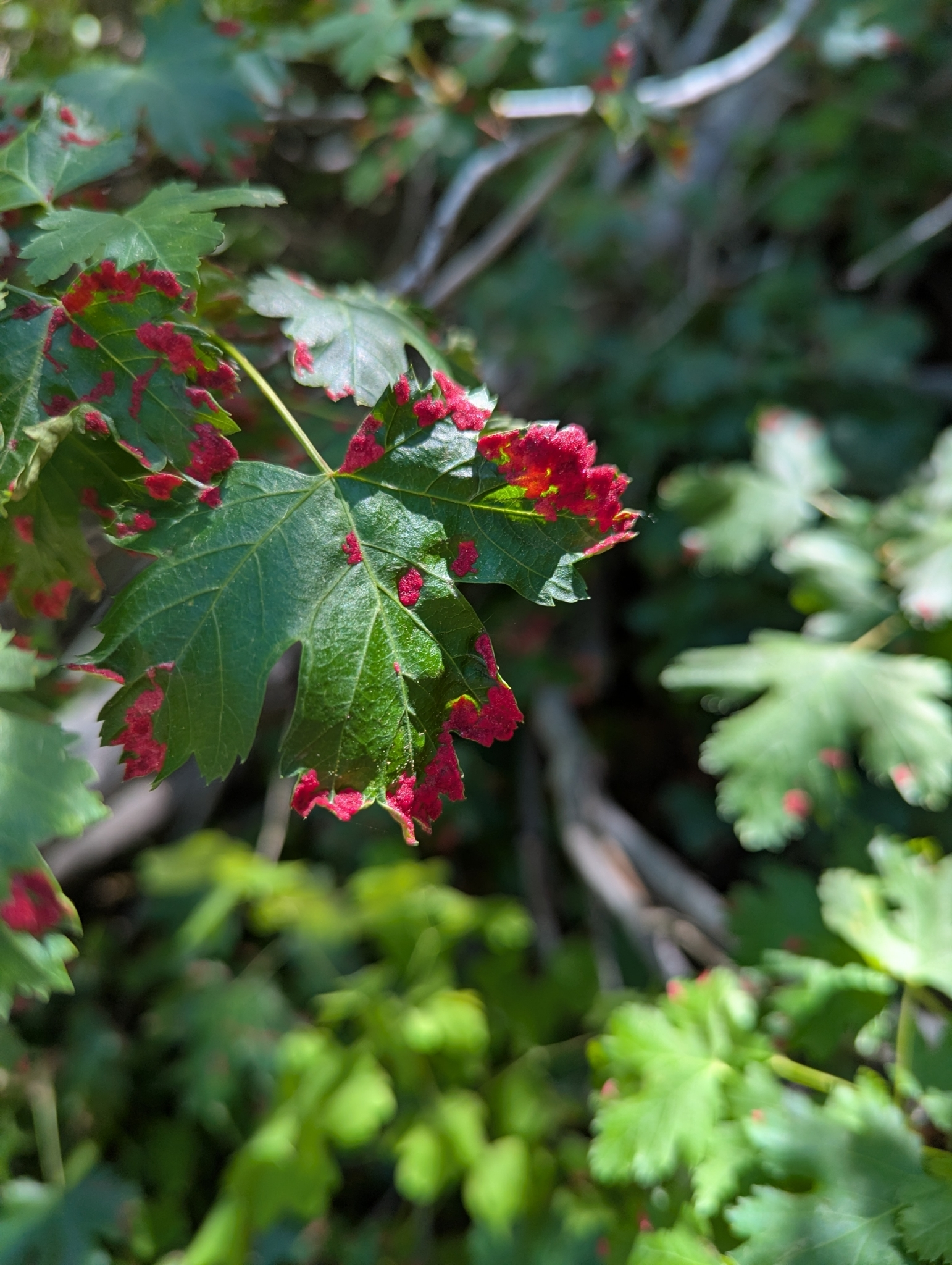
- Aceria calaceris on Rocky Mountain maple leaf, El Dorado County

Scientific classification
- Kingdom: Animalia
- Phylum: Arthropoda
- Subphylum: Chelicerata
- Class: Arachnida
- Family: Eriophyidae
- Genus: Aceria
- Species: A. calaceris

Binomial name
- Aceria calaceris Keifer, 1952
- Natural range of Aceria calaceris, estimated with iNaturalist Geomodel

Synonyms
- Eriophyes calaceris

= Aceria calaceris =

Species of mite

Aceria calaceris, the Rocky Mountain maple felt mite, is a species of eriophyid mite found in the western United States and Canada. This microscopic organism induces galls on the upper leaf surfaces of Rocky Mountain maple, Balkan maple, and Oregon maple.

== Description ==
Aceria calaceris mites are yellowish, worm-like organisms with elongated, tapered bodies, measuring only 180-190 μm in length. They are invisible to the naked eye.

When the eriophyid mites insert their mouthparts on the leaves of their host, their saliva triggers abnormal cell growth. This induces a felt-like surface of hairs called an erineum, which grows from the epidermis of its host plant's leaves, and provides both food and shelter to the colony. The erineum appears as bright aggregation of tiny papillae, typically magenta, reddish or greenish yellow in color. The species was first described from Fallen Leaf Lake by Hartford H. Keifer in 1952.

== Life cycle ==
Aceria calaceris has a complex life cycle with two forms of adult female, but only one form of male. The protogyne is the active, reproductive form of the female mite, which exists only on the leaves of its host. Males and protogynes produce more males and protogynes, as well as deutogynes, or females of the secondary form specialized for overwintering. By September, the deutogynes migrate to crevices in the bark where they become dormant for the winter. During the spring, these deutogynes come out of hybernation and move to newly developing leaf buds to lay their eggs. The eggs then hatch into more protogynes and males, to begin the cycle again.
