= Hartford H. Keifer =

American zoologist and mite authority

Hartford Hammond Keifer
- Born: 24 January 1902; Oroville, California, US
- Died: August 20, 1986 (aged 84); Sacramento, California, US
- Education: University of California, Berkeley
- Scientific career
- Fields: zoology eriophyid mites microlepidoptera
- Workplaces: California Academy of Sciences; California Department of Agriculture

Hartford Hammond Keifer (24 January 1902 – 20 August 1986) was a world authority on eriophyid mites. Based in California, he initially studied the local microlepidoptera before turning to mites in 1937.

== Personal life ==
Keifer was born 1902 in Oroville, California, to John McCarl Keifer (1861–1928) and Elizabeth Burt (née Leggett; 1863–1922). As a child he had an interest in natural history and insects, and was encouraged by an aunt, Dr. Cordelia Burt Leggett. From 1920 to 1924, he attended the University of California, Berkeley and gained a Bachelor of Science degree in entomology. He married Mary Isabelle (née Ost; 1906–1990) in August 1928 and moved to Sacramento to work at the California State Department of Agriculture.

== Biography ==
After graduation, Keifer worked for the Forest Service before accepting a position as an assistant to the curator at the California Academy of Sciences, San Francisco where he mounted and labelled a backlog of material. In 1925 he joined the academy's expedition to the Mexican islands of Revillagigedo and Tres Marias, collecting 10,000 specimens. Turning to microlepidoptera, Keifer's first species described was Recuvaria bacchariella, which he reared from larvae, and his approach was to describe life histories. In a letter to Annette Braun he stated that because of the climate (fog and cool winds), San Francisco was not the ideal place for running a light or net collecting.

Following his marriage in August 1928, he moved to Sacramento to become first laboratory assistant in charge of identifications and the collection of the California Department of Agriculture. As California's agriculture expanded, identification of species averaged 2,300 per year in 1928 and increased to 45,000 per year with the discovery of the Oriental fruit moth (Grapholita molesta) in 1942. Identifications increased to 188,000 by the 1960s. By then, there were eight taxonomists and over the years they handled infestations by Khapra beetle (Trogoderma granarium), pink bollworm (Pectinophora gossypiella), and carried out fruit fly surveys.

In 1937, there was an infestation of citrus bud mite (Aceria sheldoni) in southern California and Keifer was assigned to the identification of eriophyid mites. His descriptive work of this economically important group, spanned thirty years and describing 630 new taxa in 56 publications led to Keifer becoming a world expert on the group. In his 39 years at the Department of Agriculture, his expertise covered all orders of insects, recording the biologies, geographical distributions and first occurrences. He published his results in the Bulletin of the California Department of Agriculture and also published papers on more than 150 species of moths. His collection of mites was donated to the National Museum of Natural History Entomological Collection at the Smithsonian Institution in Washington, D.C.

=== Honorary positions and awards ===
- Secretary of the California Entomology Club for 30 years and president in 1964.
- President of the Pacific Coast Entomological Society in 1943.
- Presented with the C W Woodward Award by the Pacific branch of the Entomological Society of America in 1972.

== See also ==
- Category:Taxa named by Hartford H Keifer
