= Alfred Nalepa =

Austrian acarologist (1856–1929)

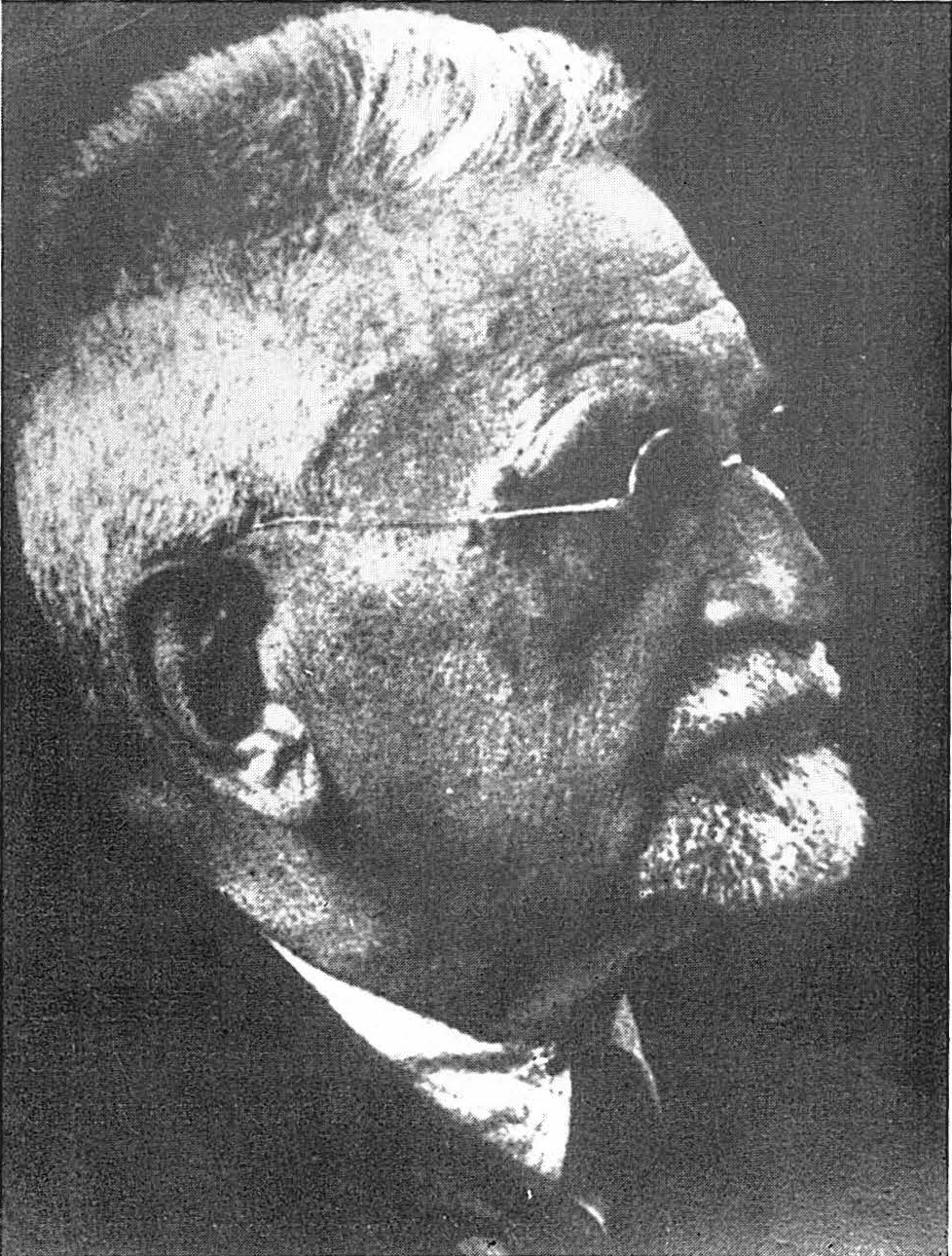

Alfred Nalepa (19 December 1856, in Werschetz – 11 December 1929, in Baden bei Wien) was an Austrian zoologist specializing in the field of acarology.

He studied natural sciences at the University of Vienna, and from 1886 was associated with the Lehrerbildungsanstalt in Linz. In 1892 he returned to Vienna, where he was high school teacher of natural history at the Elisabethgymnasium.

He described many species in the field of acarology, and was the taxonomic authority of the gall mite family, Eriophyidae.

== Principal works ==
- Beiträge zur Systematik der Phytopten, 1889 - Contribution to the systematics of Phytoptidae.
- Beiträge zur Kenntniss der Phyllocoptiden, 1894 - Contribution to the knowledge of Phyllocoptes.
- Die Naturgeschichte der Gallmilben, 1894 - Natural history of gall mites.
- Eriophyidae (Phytoptidae), 1898.
- Eriophyiden-Gallenmilben, 1911 - Eriophyidae-gall mites.
