= Ferrugineum =

Ferrugineum may refer to:

- Acalitus ferrugineum, species of eriophyid mite in the family
- Aceratium ferrugineum, species of medium-sized tree in the family Elaeocarpaceae
- Argophyllum ferrugineum, species of plant in the family Argophyllaceae
- Aulonium ferrugineum, species of cylindrical bark beetle in the family Zopheridae
- Cerylon ferrugineum, species of beetle native to Europe in the family Cerylonidae
- Diploplectron ferrugineum, species of wasp in the family Astatidae
- Gnorimoschema ferrugineum, species of moth in the family Gelechiidae
- Habrocestum ferrugineum, species of jumping spider in the genus Habrocestum
- Hydnellum ferrugineum, species of tooth fungus in the family Bankeraceae
- Koilodepas ferrugineum, species of plant in the family Euphorbiaceae
- Lasiopetalum ferrugineum, species of flowering plant in the family Malvaceae
- Nidularium ferrugineum, plant species in the genus Nidularium
- Pachymerium ferrugineum, species of centipede in the family Geophilidae
- Palaquium ferrugineum, species of tree in the family Sapotaceae
- Pedomicrobium ferrugineum, species of bacterium from the genus of Pedomicrobium
- Pittosporum ferrugineum, species of evergreen plant in the family Pittosporaceae
- Rhododendron ferrugineum, the alpenrose, a species of evergreen shrub in the family Ericaceae
- Xanthophyllum ferrugineum, tree in the family Polygalaceae
