= Acalitus calycophthirus =

Scientific classification
- Domain: Eukaryota
- Kingdom: Animalia
- Phylum: Arthropoda
- Subphylum: Chelicerata
- Class: Arachnida
- Family: Eriophyidae
- Genus: Acalitus
- Species: A. calycophthirus

Binomial name
- Acalitus calycophthirus (Nalepa, 1891)

Synonyms
- List: Phytoptus calycophthirus Nalepa, 1891; Aceria calycopthira; Aceria rudis calycopthtira; Cecydoptes calycophthirus; Eriophyes calycophthirus

Species of mite

Acalitus calycophthirus is an eriophyid mite which causes big bud galls on birch (Betula species) twigs. It is found in Europe and was first described by the Austrian zoologist, Alfred Nalepa in 1891.

== Description of the gall ==
The gall consists of clusters of swollen leaves and, at first in the spring, are silvery-green. They gradually turn brown and become quite woody. The gall shelters a large number of mites which spend most of the year there, passing the winter in a dormant state. In the following spring and early summer they emerge to invade the new buds. Affected trees are silver birch (Betula pendula) and downy birch (Betula pubescens).

== Inquiline ==
A mite, Cecidophyopsis vermiformis is an inquiline of Acalitus calycophthirus, as well as an inquiline of Aceria tenella on hornbeam and Phytoptus avellanae on hazel.
