= Astata affinis =

Scientific classification
- Kingdom: Animalia
- Phylum: Arthropoda
- Class: Insecta
- Order: Hymenoptera
- Family: Astatidae
- Genus: Astata
- Species: A. affinis

Binomial name
- Astata affinis Linden, 1829

Synonyms
- Dimorpha affinis Vander Linden, 1829

Species of wasp

Astata affinis is a species of wasp in the family Astatidae. It is found in Europe & Northern Asia (excluding China).

== Subspecies ==
These subspecies belong to the species Astata affinis:

- Astata affinis ariadne (Pulawski, 1959)
- Astata affinis jerichoensis (Pulawski, 1957)
- Astata affinis radoszkowskii (Pulawski, 1957)
