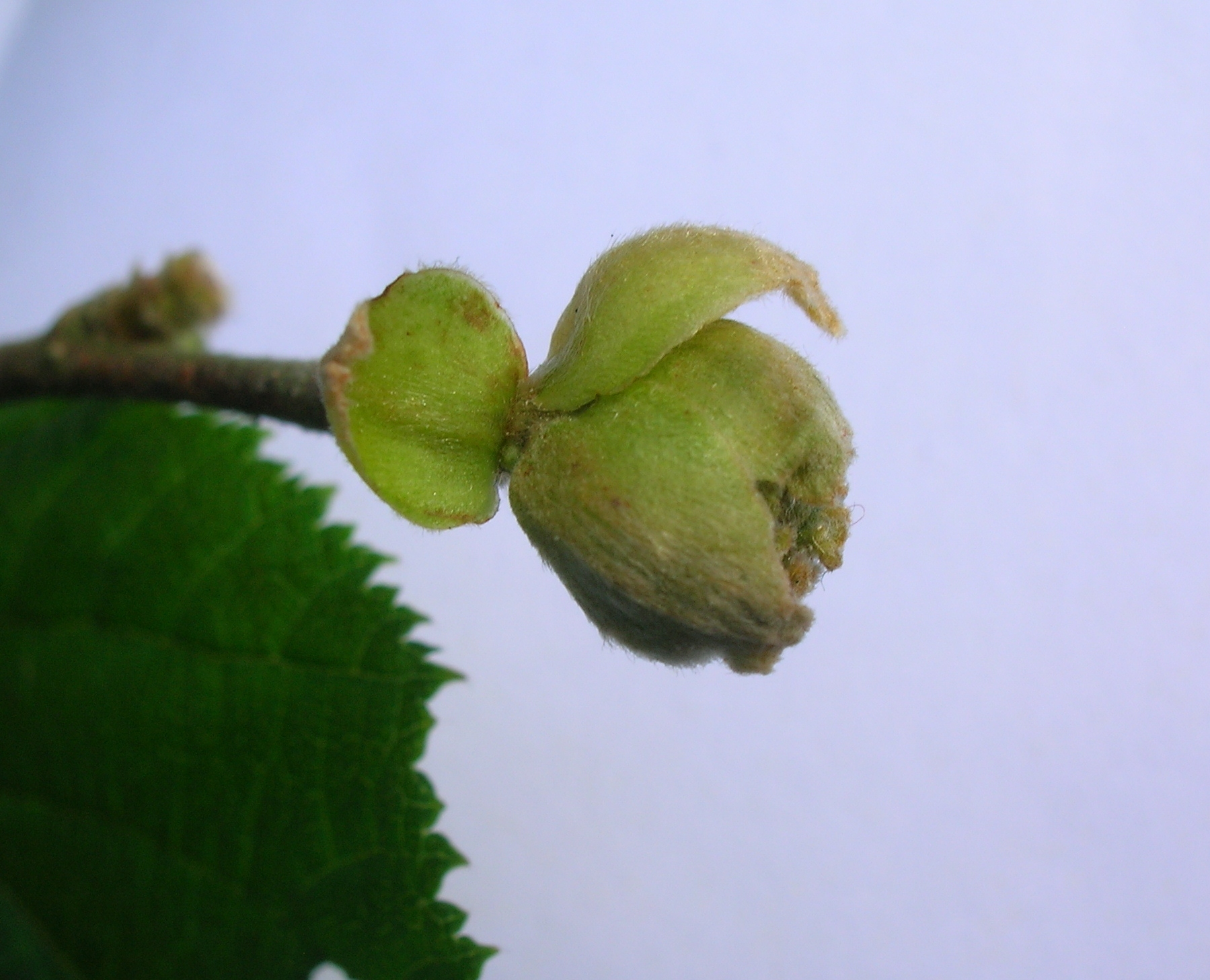
- Phytoptus avellanae

Scientific classification
- Kingdom: Animalia
- Phylum: Arthropoda
- Subphylum: Chelicerata
- Class: Arachnida
- Order: Trombidiformes
- Family: Phytoptidae

= Phytoptidae =

Family of mites

Phytoptidae is a family of mites belonging to the order Trombidiformes.

== Genera ==
Genera:

- Acathrix Keifer, 1962
- Anchiphytoptus Keifer, 1952
- Austracus Keifer, 1944
- Boczekella Farkas, 1965
- Borassia Chetverikov & Craemer, 2017
- Calycophthora Sorauer, 1886
- Fragariocoptes Roivainen, 1951
- Loboquintus Chetverikov & Petanovic, 2013
- Mackiella Keifer, 1939
- Nalepella Keifer, 1944
- Neopropilus Huang, 1992
- Neoprothrix Reis & Navia, 2014
- Novophytoptus Roivainen, 1947
- Oziella Amrine, Stasny & Flechtmann, 2003
- Palmiphytoptus Navia & Flechtmann, 2002
- Pentaporca Huang, 1996
- Pentasetacus Schliesske, 1985
- Phantacrus Keifer, 1965
- Phytoptus Dujardin, 1851
- Propilus Keifer, 1975
- Prothrix Keifer, 1965
- Retracrus Keifer, 1965
- Setoptus Keifer, 1944
- Sierraphytoptus Keifer, 1939
- Trisetacus Keifer, 1952
