= Astata unicolor =

Scientific classification
- Domain: Eukaryota
- Kingdom: Animalia
- Phylum: Arthropoda
- Class: Insecta
- Order: Hymenoptera
- Family: Astatidae
- Genus: Astata
- Species: A. unicolor

Binomial name
- Astata unicolor Say, 1824

Synonyms
- Astata insularis Cresson, 1865; Astata rufiventris Cresson, 1873

Species of wasp

Astata unicolor is a species of wasp in the family Astatidae. It is found in Central America and North America. The species is sexually dimorphic, with males have black abdomens, while females are black and orange. It is a predator of Pentatomidae, including Halyomorpha halys, which is invasive to North America.
