= Astata gallica =

Scientific classification
- Kingdom: Animalia
- Phylum: Arthropoda
- Class: Insecta
- Order: Hymenoptera
- Family: Astatidae
- Genus: Astata
- Species: A. gallica

Binomial name
- Astata gallica de Beaumont, 1942

Species of wasp

Astata gallica is a species of wasp in the family Astatidae. It is found in Europe & North Africa.
