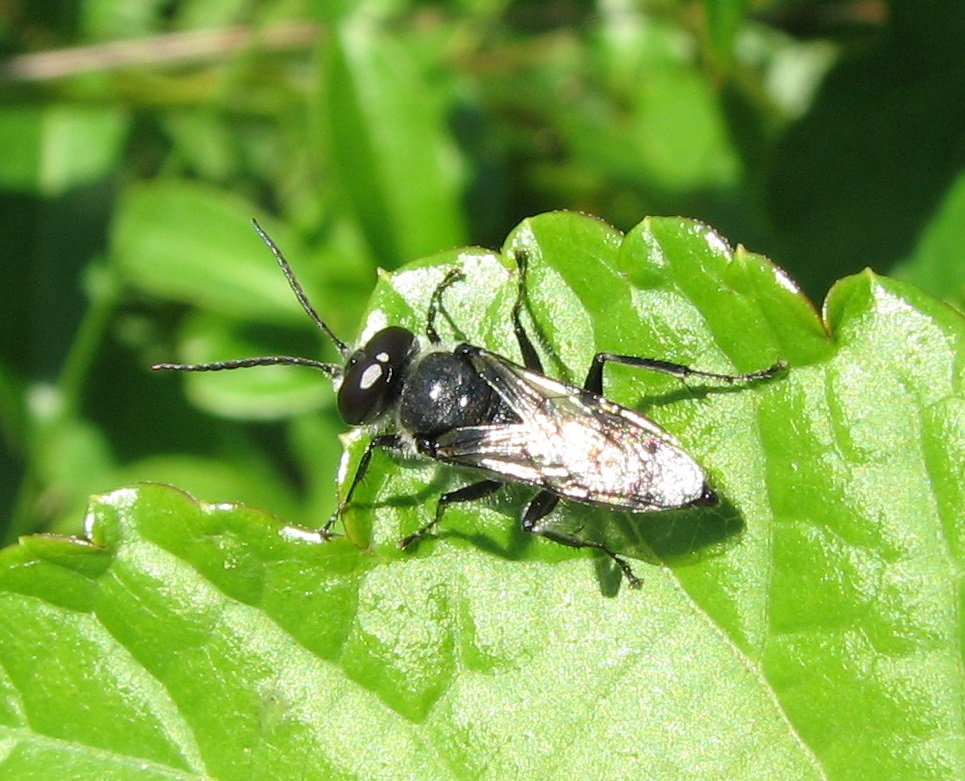
- Male

Scientific classification
- Kingdom: Animalia
- Phylum: Arthropoda
- Class: Insecta
- Order: Hymenoptera
- Family: Astatidae
- Genus: Astata; Latreille, 1796

Type species
- Astata boops (Schrank, 1871)

Species
- More than 80; see text

= Astata =

Genus of wasps

Astata is a cosmopolitan genus of solitary predatory wasps in the family Astatidae. They are known to prey on adults and nymphs of Pentatomidae. Astata is the largest genus in this subfamily, and is identified by features of its wing venation. The males of this genus and the related genus Dryudella have very large compound eyes that broadly meet at the top of the head.

There are 87 known species and subspecies of Astata worldwide, a few of which are listed here:

- Astata affinis Vander Linden, 1829
- Astata apostata Mercet, 1910
- Astata bicolor Say, 1823
- Astata boops (Schrank, 1781)
- Astata brevitarsis Puławski, 1958
- Astata costae A. Costa, 1867
- Astata diversipes Puławski, 1955
- Astata gallica de Beaumont, 1942
- Astata graeca de Beaumont, 1965
- Astata leuthstromi Ashmead 1897
- Astata melanaria Cameron, 1905
- Astata minor Kohl, 1885
- Astata occidentalis Cresson, 1881
- Astata quettae Nurse, 1903
- Astata rufipes Mocsáry, 1883
- Astata unicolor Say, 1824
