= Astata occidentalis =

Scientific classification
- Kingdom: Animalia
- Phylum: Arthropoda
- Class: Insecta
- Order: Hymenoptera
- Family: Astatidae
- Genus: Astata
- Species: A. occidentalis

Binomial name
- Astata occidentalis Cresson, 1881

Synonyms
- Astata apicipennis Cameron, 1890; Astata tinctipennis Cameron, 1890; Astatus sayi W. Fox, 1894

Species of wasp

Astata occidentalis is a species of wasp in the family Astatidae. It is found in Central America and North America.

A. occidentalis is attracted to stink bugs through the use of kairomones. Specifically, female wasps have been caught in traps baited with pheromones of Thyanta pallidovirens, and there is evidence to suggest that the commonality of the ester component of these pheromones between stink bug species could allow A. occidentalis to target several types of stink bug.
