= Astata brevitarsis =

Scientific classification
- Kingdom: Animalia
- Phylum: Arthropoda
- Class: Insecta
- Order: Hymenoptera
- Family: Astatidae
- Genus: Astata
- Species: A. brevitarsis

Binomial name
- Astata brevitarsis Puławski, 1958

Species of wasp

Astata brevitarsis is a species of wasp in the family Astatidae. It is found in Europe & Northern Asia (excluding China).
