= Astata bicolor =

Scientific classification
- Domain: Eukaryota
- Kingdom: Animalia
- Phylum: Arthropoda
- Class: Insecta
- Order: Hymenoptera
- Family: Astatidae
- Genus: Astata
- Species: A. bicolor

Binomial name
- Astata bicolor Say, 1823

Synonyms
- Astata terminata Cresson, 1873; Astatus pygidialis W. Fox, 1892

Species of wasp

Astata bicolor is a species of wasp in the family Astatidae. It is found in Central America and North America.
