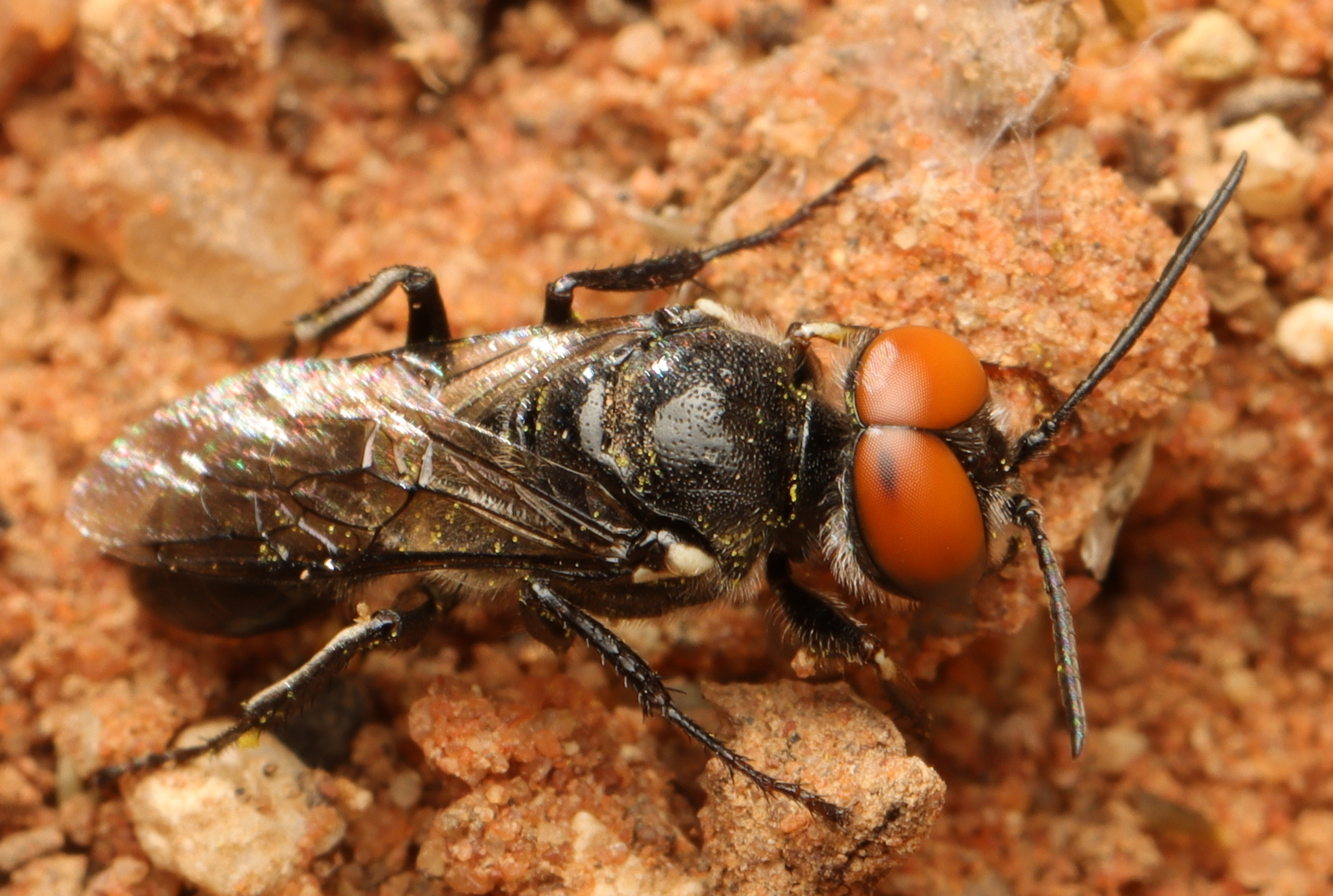

Scientific classification
- Kingdom: Animalia
- Phylum: Arthropoda
- Clade: Pancrustacea
- Class: Insecta
- Order: Hymenoptera
- Family: Astatidae
- Genus: Astata
- Species: A. melanaria

Binomial name
- Astata melanaria Cameron, 1905

= Astata melanaria =

Species of wasp

Astata melanaria is a species of wasp in the family Astatidae. It is found in South Africa.

== Description ==
This wasp is black, much of it being covered with white hairs. The tegulae and the bases of the front tibiae are whitish. The fore-wings are slightly darkened (with a slight violaceous tinge) from the base to the ends of the cells; beyond the fore-wing cells, the apex of the wins are clear hyaline; the veins and the stigmas are black. The radial cell is roughly the same length as the length of the second and third cubital cells (along the cubital vein). The mesonotum is closely punctured, punctures are most dense on the sides. The dorsum of the scutellum is also fairly closely punctured.
