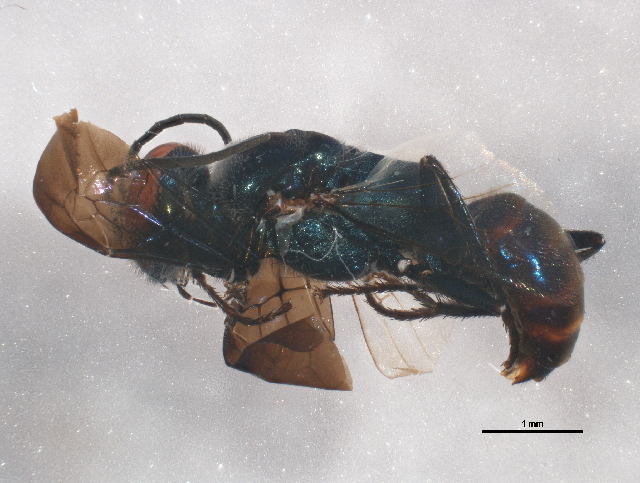

Scientific classification
- Domain: Eukaryota
- Kingdom: Animalia
- Phylum: Arthropoda
- Class: Insecta
- Order: Hymenoptera
- Family: Astatidae
- Genus: Dryudella
- Species: D. caerulea

Binomial name
- Dryudella caerulea (Cresson, 1881)

Synonyms
- Astata caerulea Cresson, 1881

= Dryudella caerulea =

Species of wasp

Dryudella caerulea is a species of wasp in the family Astatidae. It is found in Central America and North America.
