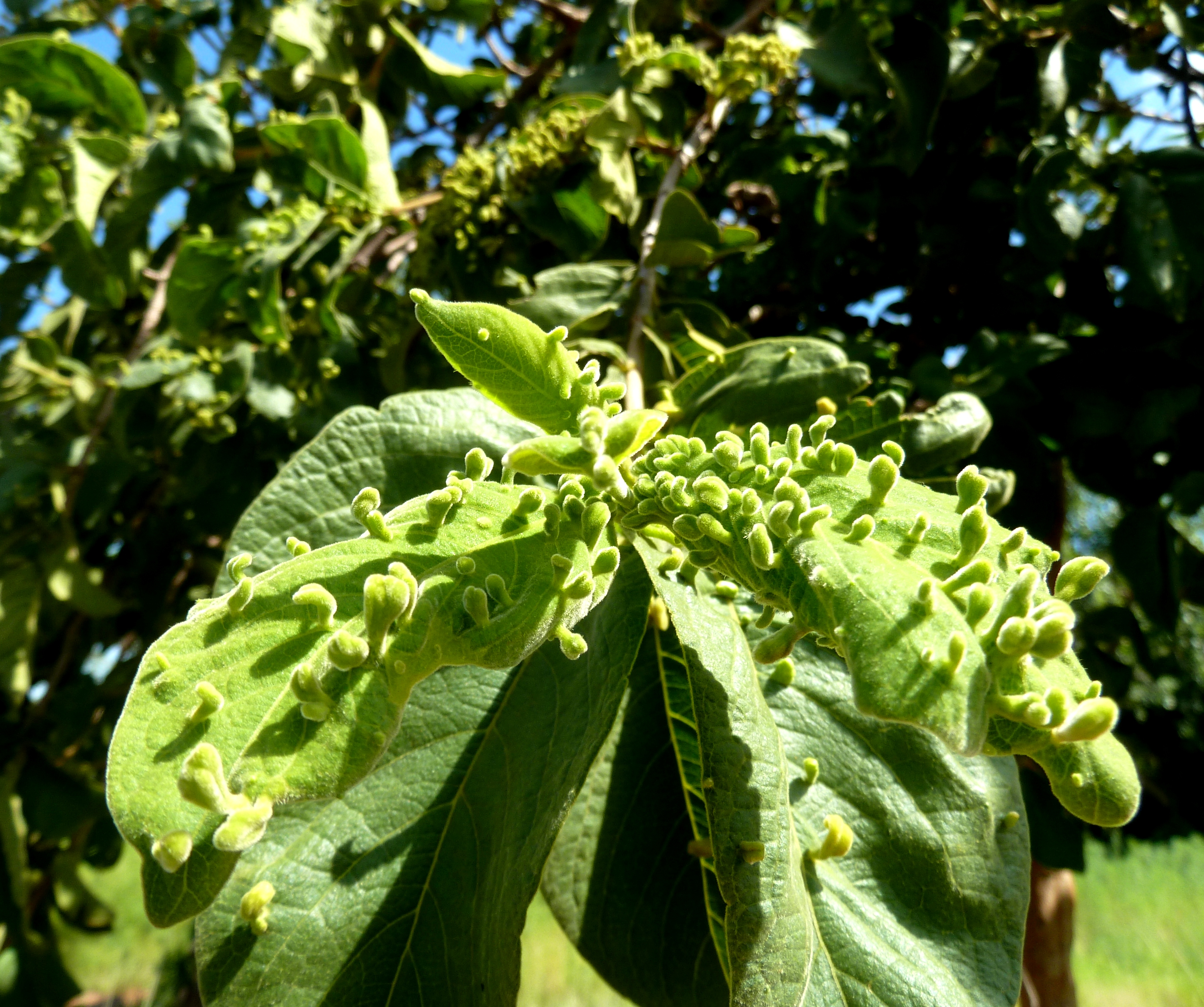
- Acalitus mallyi galls on Vangueria infausta

Scientific classification
- Kingdom: Animalia
- Phylum: Arthropoda
- Subphylum: Chelicerata
- Class: Arachnida
- Order: Trombidiformes
- Family: Eriophyidae
- Genus: Acalitus; Keifer, 1965

Type species
- Acalitus ledi Keifer, 1965

= Acalitus =

Genus of mites

Acalitus is a genus of mites in the family Eriophyidae. These cosmopolitan, microscopic arthropods form galls on various plants, and some species such as Acalitus essigi and Acalitus vaccinii are pests of agricultural significance associated with berry crops. This genus includes, but is not limited to the following species:

- Acalitus acanthus Smith-Meyer, 1990
- Acalitus accolus Flechtmann, Amrine & Stasny, 1995
- Acalitus acnistii (Keifer, 1953)
- Acalitus aethiopicus Smith-Meyer, 1990
- Acalitus amicorum Flechtmann in Flechtmann, Kreiter, Etienne & Moraes, 2000
- Acalitus amydros Flechtmann & Etienne, 2001
- Acalitus ancyrivalis Smith-Meyer, 1990
- Acalitus anthonii Keifer, 1972
- Acalitus australis (Lamb, 1952)
- Acalitus avicenniae (Lamb, 1952)
- Acalitus batissimus Wilson, 1970
- Acalitus bosquieae (Farkas, 1961)
- Acalitus brevitarsus (Fockeu, 1890)
- Acalitus calycophthirus (Nalepa, 1891)
- Acalitus capparidis Flechtmann in Flechtmann, Kreiter, Etienne & Moraes, 2000
- Acalitus carbonis Navia & Flechtmann, 1998
- Acalitus carpatus Manson, 1984
- Acalitus chimanemanus Smith-Meyer, 1990
- Acalitus comptus Flechtmann in Flechtmann, Kreiter, Etienne & Moraes, 2000
- Acalitus cotoneastri (Nalepa, 1926)
- Acalitus cottieri (Lamb, 1952)
- Acalitus crotoni Smith-Meyer, 1990
- Acalitus dissimus Manson, 1984
- Acalitus epiphytivagrans Mohanasundaram, 1983
- Acalitus essigi (Hassan, 1928)
- Acalitus excelsus Manson, 1984
- Eriophyes ferrugineum
- Acalitus gilae Keifer, 1970
- Acalitus gossypii (Banks, 1904)
- Acalitus granulatus Flechtmann & Etienne, 2000
- Acalitus gratissimae Smith-Meyer, 1990
- Acalitus hassani Keifer, 1973
- Acalitus heliopsis Keifer, 1975
- Acalitus hereroensei Smith-Meyer, 1990
- Acalitus hibisci Mondal & Chakrabarti, 1982
- Acalitus intertextus Manson, 1984
- Acalitus inulaefolii Keifer, 1970
- Acalitus ipomocarneae Keifer, 1977
- Acalitus khorixanus Smith-Meyer, 1990
- Acalitus kohus Manson, 1984
- Acalitus ledi Keifer, 1965
- Acalitus longisetosus (Nalepa, 1892)
- Acalitus lowei Manson, 1971
- Acalitus lycioides Smith-Meyer, 1990
- Acalitus macrosetosus Flechtmann & Etienne, 2003
- Acalitus malelanus Smith-Meyer, 1990
- Acalitus mallyi (Tucker, 1926)
- Acalitus malpighiae Keifer, 1977
- Acalitus maracai (Boczek & Nuzzaci, 1988)
- Acalitus marinae Smith-Meyer, 1990
- Acalitus meliosmae Mohanasundaram, 1981
- Acalitus mikaniae Keifer, 1974
- Acalitus morrisoni Manson, 1970
- Acalitus notolius (Nalepa, 1919)
- Acalitus odoratus Keifer, 1970
- Acalitus orthomerus (Keifer, 1951)
- Acalitus osmius (Cromroy, 1958)
- Acalitus persicae Luo & Jiang, 1988
- Acalitus phloeocoptes (Nalepa, 1890)
- Acalitus phoradendronis Keifer, 1972
- Acalitus phyllereus (Nalepa, 1919)
- Acalitus plicans (Nalepa, 1917)
- Acalitus prunispinosae (Nalepa, 1926)
- Acalitus pundamariae Smith-Meyer, 1990
- Acalitus purpurascensis (Cromroy, 1958)
- Acalitus rapaneae Keifer, 1977
- Acalitus reticulatae Mohanasundaram, 1981
- Acalitus rubensis Manson, 1970
- Acalitus rudis (G. Canestrini, 1891)
- Acalitus ruelliae (Channabasavanna, 1966)
- Acalitus sageretiae Kuang, 1987
- Acalitus salvadorae Keifer, 1974
- Acalitus santaluciae Keifer, 1966
- Acalitus santibanezi Garcia-Valencia & Hoffmann, 1997
- Acalitus schefflerae Mohanasundaram, 1981
- Acalitus simplex Flechtmann & Etienne, 2002
- Acalitus sogerctiae Kuang-Haiyua, 1987
- Acalitus spinus Manson, 1984
- Acalitus stenaspis (Nalepa, 1891)
- Acalitus stereothrix (Nalepa, 1914)
- Acalitus tanisetus Flechtmann, 1999
- Acalitus tanylobus Smith-Meyer, 1990
- Acalitus taurangensis (Manson, 1965)
- Acalitus ueckermanni Smith-Meyer, 1990
- Acalitus vaccinii (Keifer, 1939)

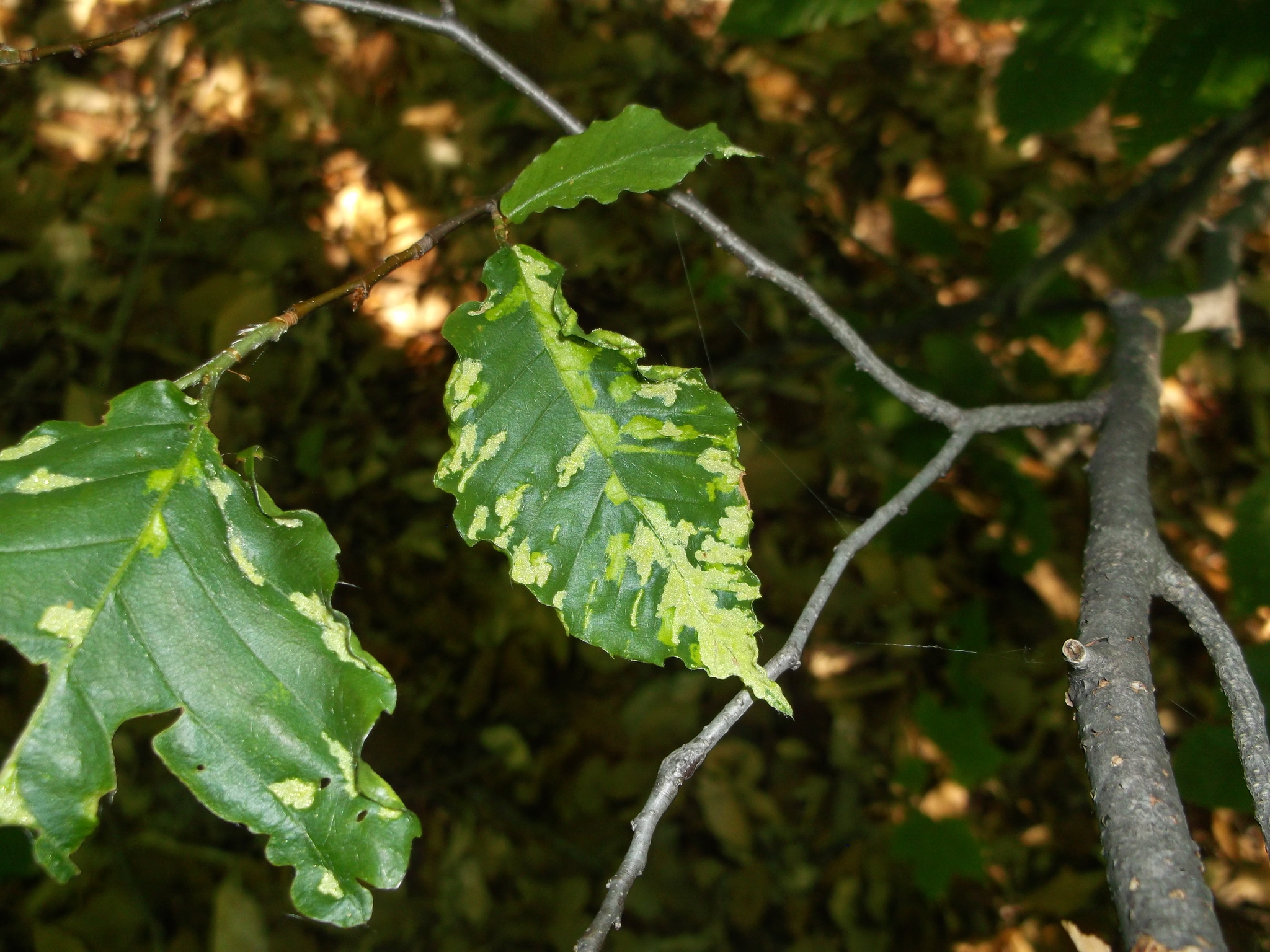
Leaves of Fagus grandifolia exhibiting erineum galls induced by Acalitus ferrugineum
