= Acalitus essigi =

Scientific classification
- Domain: Eukaryota
- Kingdom: Animalia
- Phylum: Arthropoda
- Subphylum: Chelicerata
- Class: Arachnida
- Family: Eriophyidae
- Genus: Acalitus
- Species: A. essigi

Binomial name
- Acalitus essigi (Hassan 1928)

Species of mite

Acalitus essigi, the redberry mite, is an eriophyid mite which is a serious pest of commercially produced blackberries in the United States. The redberry mite is microscopic, requiring at least a 20× hand lens to detect. It has two pairs of legs and a thin, translucent appearance.

Overwintering mites colonize tiny spaces beneath the exterior scales of dormant buds of blackberries. As the season progresses, redberry mite migration occurs up the flower stem to colonize leaf axial bracts, the fruit's calyx area as well as the spaces between berry druplets. Redberry mite feeding prevents berries from ripening uniformly, causing from one to many druplets to remain as a bright red cluster on the otherwise black and fully ripe fruit. Affected druplets never do ripen, causing the entire fruit to be inedible and unmarketable. Historically, redberry mite has been most damaging to blackberry varieties such as Chester, which mature later in the summer (August and September). Yield loss to redberry mite damage can range from 10 to 50% of the total blackberry crop.

Infestations of redberry mite are often controlled with lime sulfur or natural acaricidal oils.
