= Phytoptus atherodes =

Scientific classification
- Domain: Eukaryota
- Kingdom: Animalia
- Phylum: Arthropoda
- Subphylum: Chelicerata
- Class: Arachnida
- Family: Eriophyidae
- Genus: Phytoptus
- Species: P. atherodes

Binomial name
- Phytoptus atherodes Chetverikov, 2011

Species of mite

Phytoptus atherodes is a species of mite in the family Eriophyidae, discovered by Philipp E. Chetverikov in 2011.

== Description ==
In P. atherodes, males are smaller than females, and the body is long, wide, whitish in color and resembles a worm, having a prodorsal shield with a figure on it looking like the Greek letter "Ψ".
