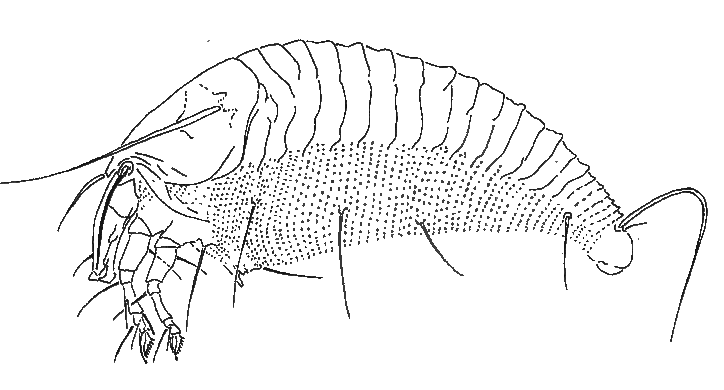
- Nalepella danica

Scientific classification
- Domain: Eukaryota
- Kingdom: Animalia
- Phylum: Arthropoda
- Subphylum: Chelicerata
- Class: Arachnida
- Order: Trombidiformes
- Family: Phytoptidae
- Genus: Nalepella; Keifer, 1944

= Nalepella =

Genus of mites infesting conifers

Nalepella, the rust mites, is a genus of very small Trombidiform mites in the family Phytoptidae. They are commonly found on a variety of conifers, including hemlock, spruce, balsam fir, and pine. They sometimes infest Christmas trees in nurseries. Nalepella mites are vagrants, meaning they circulate around the tree; females overwinter in bark cracks. Infested spruce emit a characteristic odour.

== Distribution ==
The genus is holarctic, and species are found in North America, Europe, and China.

== Effects ==
The mites feed on the cell sap of the tree's needles, sometimes causing severe damage. Typical effects from a Nalepella infestation include needle discolouration and premature needle drop. The colour of discolouration varies by species; for example, Nalepella tsugifoliae causes yellowed or grey discolouration, while Nalepella halourga's discolouration is more bronze in colour. Some species are considered serious pests of ornamental coniferous trees. They are commonly found on Christmas trees in North America and Europe, and they may seriously damage the tree.

Spruce infested by Nalepella were found to increase emissions of certain compounds that may cause the characteristic smell of infested plants. Another study in 2009 found that some compounds emitted by infected spruce attracted or repelled Hylobius abietis, another pest of conifers.

== Life cycle ==
Nalepella mite eggs overwinter on needles, then hatch early in the spring. As cold-season mites, they are most active in the early spring and the fall. The mites deposit eggs during the fall, but may continue to be active into the winter. They have multiple generations per year.

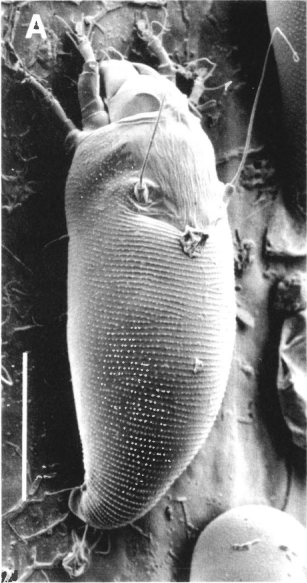
N. danica

== Species ==
- Nalepella abiesis (Note: Previously known as Rhyncaphytoptus abiesis.)
- Nalepella brewrieanae
- Nalepella danica
- Nalepella ednae
- Nalepella fargesis
- Nalepella haarlovi
  - N. haarlovi piceaabietis (Note: Also spelled picea-abietis.)
- Nalepella halourga
- Nalepella longoctonema
- Nalepella newkirki
- Nalepella octonema
- Nalepella shevtchenkoi
- Nalepella pini
- Nalepella tisamae
- Nalepella torreyae
- Nalepella triceras (Note: Originally described as Phyllocoptes triceras.)
- Nalepella tsugae
- Nalepella tsugifoliae

=== Species details ===
==== Nalepella brewrieanae ====
N. brewrieanae, first discovered in 2003 on Picea breweriana. It was first described from Germany, but is also known from Poland. Besides P. breweriana, it is also known from P. abies and P. glauca.

==== Nalepella danica ====
Nalepella danica infests members of the Abies (fir) genus. Specifically, it has been recorded from A. alba, A. concolor, A. lasiocarpa, and A. nordmanniana. It causes small rusty brown to bronze spots on the needles of its host plant, but a severe infestation can result in defoliation. Nymphs typically grow between 90 and 108 μm, while female adults 145 and 240 μm. They are known exclusively from Denmark.

==== Nalepella ednae ====
Nalepella ednae is distributed across the central and Northwestern United States, as well as in British Columbia. They are of concern in Mexico, where they may be introduced via cut Christmas trees. Although it is only known from a few fir species, all may be hosts. The damage they cause is unknown.

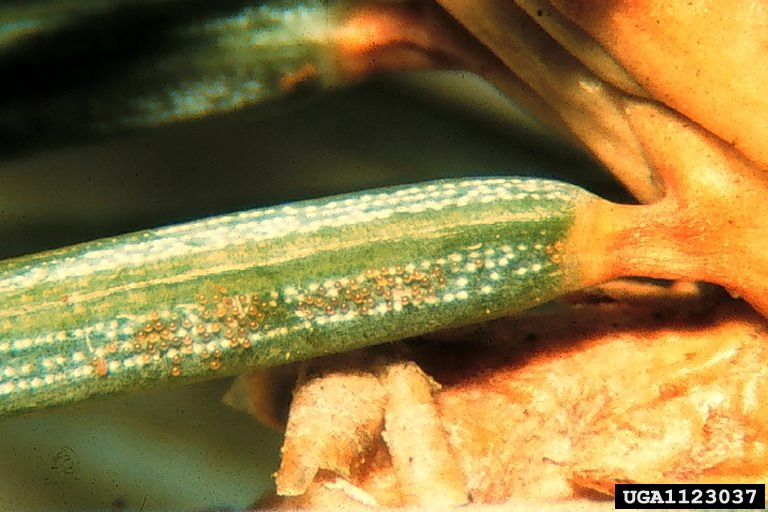
Nalepella halourga eggs

==== Nalepella haarlovi ====
Nalepella haarlovi is known from Denmark and Finland. It has been recorded infesting Picea sitchensis. They are one of the most economically important members of the genus. This species has four to eight generations per year.

==== Nalepella halourga ====
Nalepella halourga, commonly known as the spruce rust mite, is restricted to Picea (spruce). Their colour varies throughout the year; during the growing season, they are colourless to pale yellow, but in the fall they turn reddish-purple. They are found in Eastern North America.

==== Nalepella longoctonema ====
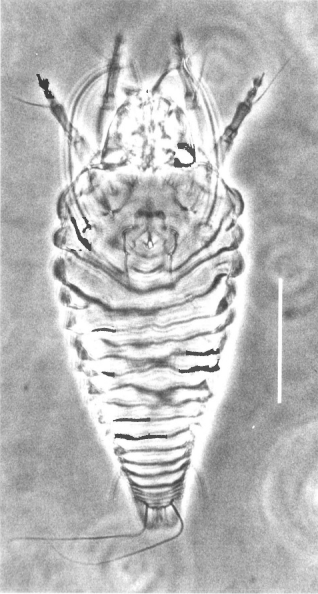
N. danica

Nalepella longoctonema was first described in 1991 from two fir species in Oregon. They grow to 206 μm in length, and have been collected in large numbers on fir plantations. They are one of the most economically important members of the genus.

==== Nalepella shevtchenkoi ====
Nalepella shevtchenkoi lives around the bases of the host plant's needles, as well as on its stems. It is known from Abies (fir) and Picea (spruce) species. The species is considered one of the most damaging of the eriophyoid mites. It is found in parts of central and eastern Europe.

==== Nalepella tsugifoliae ====
The hemlock rust mite is reddish-orange in colour, and has relatively large eggs. They infest fir, hemlock, larch, and yew to high densities- there may be as many as 100 mites on one needle. Infested trees turn bluish, then yellow, before beginning to drop needles. They feed on both sides of the tree's needles.
