= Diploplectron ferrugineum =

Scientific classification
- Domain: Eukaryota
- Kingdom: Animalia
- Phylum: Arthropoda
- Class: Insecta
- Order: Hymenoptera
- Family: Astatidae
- Genus: Diploplectron
- Species: D. ferrugineum

Binomial name
- Diploplectron ferrugineum Ashmead, 1899

Synonyms
- Diploplectron ashmeadi Rohwer, 1909; Diploplectron cressoni Rohwer, 1909; Diploplectron relativum Rohwer, 1909

Species of wasp

Diploplectron ferrugineum is a species of wasp in the family Astatidae. It is found in North America.
