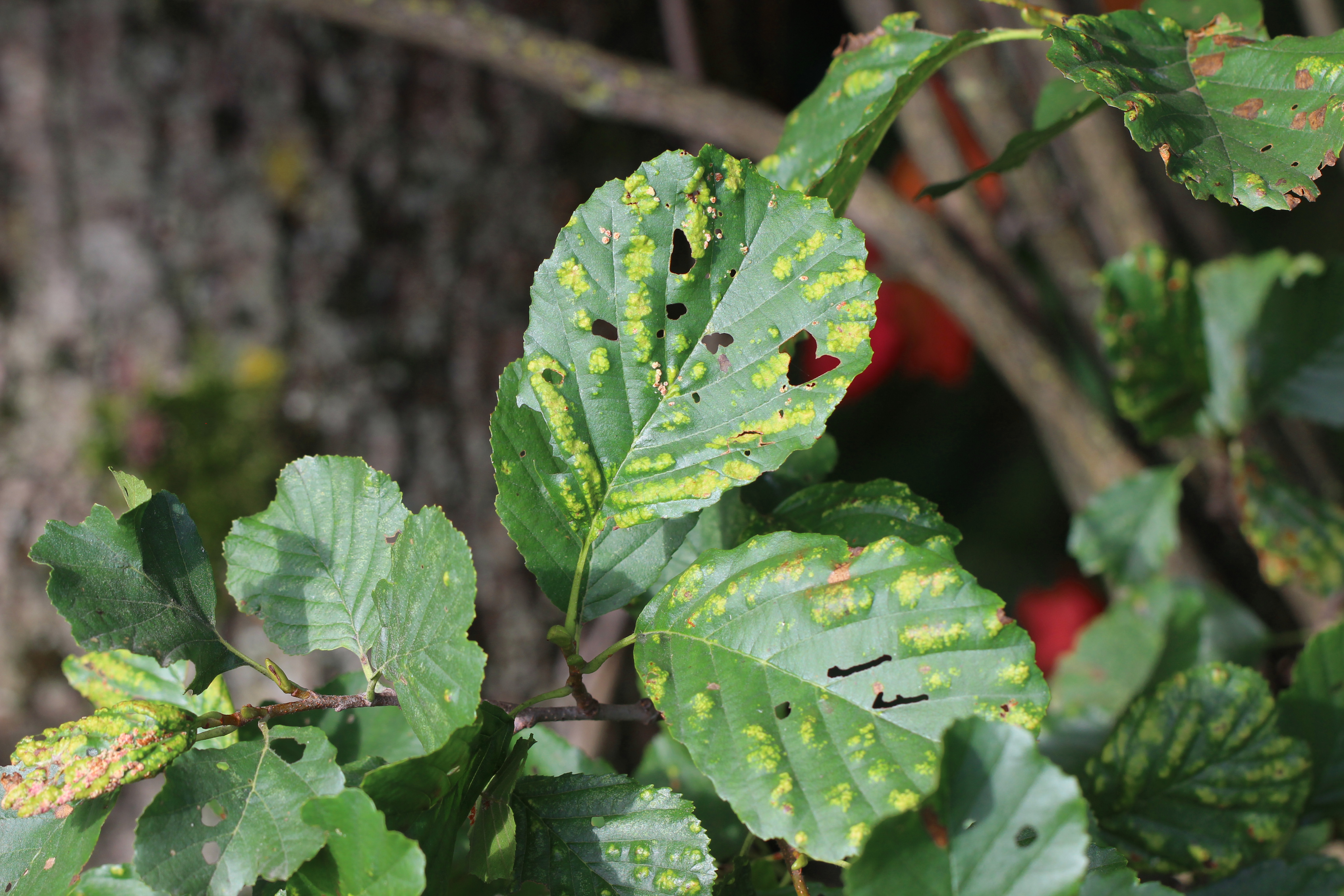

Scientific classification
- Domain: Eukaryota
- Kingdom: Animalia
- Phylum: Arthropoda
- Subphylum: Chelicerata
- Class: Arachnida
- Family: Eriophyidae
- Genus: Acalitus
- Species: A. brevitarsus

Binomial name
- Acalitus brevitarsus (Fockeu, 1890)

Synonyms
- List: Acalitus brevitarsus; Eriophyes brevitarsis; Eriophyes brevitarsus

= Acalitus brevitarsus =

Species of mite

Acalitus brevitarsus is an eriophyid mite which induces domed, blister like swellings, known as galls, on some species of alder (Alnus species).

== Description of the gall ==
A pale, slightly domed swelling on the upper surface, which is induced by mites living and feeding within erineum (hairs), on the lower surface. The hairs are white or yellowish at first, later rust-brown and when viewed with a hand lens, the erineum look like a mat of shiny, glass-like hairs. In the autumn the mites spend the winter in old cones and bark crevices.

This gall is found on Italian alder (Alnus cordata), European alder (Alnus glutinosa), grey alder (Alnus incana), Alnus x pubescens and Alnus viridis.

Similar species

A fungus, Taphrina sadebeckii, can look similar on the upper surface.

== Distribution ==
Found in Europe from Spain to Russia including the Balkans.
