= Acalitus stenaspis =

Scientific classification
- Domain: Eukaryota
- Kingdom: Animalia
- Phylum: Arthropoda
- Subphylum: Chelicerata
- Class: Arachnida
- Family: Eriophyidae
- Genus: Acalitus
- Species: A. stenaspis

Binomial name
- Acalitus stenaspis (Nalepa, 1891)

Synonyms
- List: Phytoptus stenaspis Nalepa, 1891; Eriophyes blastophthirus Nalepa, 1917; Acalitus blastophthirus; Cecydoptes blastophthirus; Cecydoptes stenaspis

Species of mite

Acalitus stenaspis is an eriophyid mite which causes galls on beech (Fagus species). It is found in Europe and was first described by the Austrian zoologist Alfred Nalepa in 1891.

== Description of the gall ==
Acalitus stenaspis causes three different galls on beech. In spring leaves may be stunted, thickly covered in silver-grey hairs, and may be folded with wavy veins and contain mites.

The gall most associated with this species is the edge of the leaf curling upwards and forming a very tight roll, which is often overlooked. During the summer, numerous mites live inside the gall feeding on a mass of tiny hairs. The roll is pale green or yellow. They leave the gall before leaf fall and spend the winter in the dormant buds. In Scotland downward rolls have been found which may be caused by the same species.

A third gall may be buds that grow up to 3 cm long; the shoot becomes disfigured and the leaves are wavy, have an irregular venation and are covered in long hairs. If the shoot overcomes the mite, younger leaves appear normal.

Most literature and websites refer to galls recorded mainly on beech (Fagus sylvatica). Galls have also been recorded on Crimean beech Fagus × taurica.

== Inquilines ==
Arthrocnodax gemmarum is an Inquiline which lives in the gall alongside the gall-causer,

== Distribution ==
Found in Europe, including Bosnia and Herzegovina, Croatia, Czech Republic, Denmark, France, Germany, Great Britain, Ireland, Italy, Kosovo, Latvia, Lithuania, Montenegro, North Macedonia, Poland, Serbia, Spain and Switzerland.
