= Acalitus vaccinii =

Scientific classification
- Kingdom: Animalia
- Phylum: Arthropoda
- Subphylum: Chelicerata
- Class: Arachnida
- Family: Eriophyidae
- Genus: Acalitus
- Species: A. vaccinii

Binomial name
- Acalitus vaccinii (Keifer 1939)

Species of mite

Acalitus vaccinii, the blueberry bud mite, is an economically important eriophyid mite in the genus Acalitus.

== Distribution and habitat ==
The blueberry bud mite's native range is likely North America, where it is found on the buds of both wild and cultivated blueberries. In 2014, it was identified on blueberry crops in South Africa.

== Physiology ==
The blueberry bud mite is around 200 μm long and is white. Like other members of the genus Acalitus, it does not have a seta on its the foremost part of the tibia. The female genital coverflap has a row of longitudinal cuticular ridges.
