= Diploplectron =

Scientific classification
- Kingdom: Animalia
- Phylum: Arthropoda
- Clade: Pancrustacea
- Class: Insecta
- Order: Hymenoptera
- Family: Astatidae
- Genus: Diploplectron; W. Fox, 1893

Genus of wasps

Diploplectron is a genus of wasps in the family Astatidae. There are more than 20 described species in Diploplectron.

Wasps in the genus Diploplectron are solitary predatory wasps belonging to the subfamily Astatinae. They prey on true bugs (Hemiptera), which are used as food for their developing offspring. Some species excavate nests in sandy soil, and research on the genus has documented nesting behaviour and prey records.

== Species ==
These 22 species belong to the genus Diploplectron:

- Diploplectron alexandri Kazenas, 1996
- Diploplectron asiaticum Pulawski, 1965
- Diploplectron beccum F. Parker, 1972
- Diploplectron bidentatiformis Rohwer
- Diploplectron brunneipes (Cresson, 1881)
- Diploplectron californicum F. Parker, 1972
- Diploplectron diablense F. Williams, 1951
- Diploplectron ferrugineum Ashmead, 1899
- Diploplectron florissantensis Rohwer
- Diploplectron fossor Rohwer, 1909
- Diploplectron irwini F. Parker, 1972
- Diploplectron kantsi Pate, 1941
- Diploplectron kriegeri Brauns, 1899
- Diploplectron neotropicum F. Parker, 1972
- Diploplectron orizabense F. Parker, 1972
- Diploplectron palearcticum Pulawski, 1958
- Diploplectron peglowi Krombein, 1939
- Diploplectron pulawskii Kazenas, 1975
- Diploplectron reticulatum F. Williams, 1946
- Diploplectron secoense F. Parker, 1972
- Diploplectron sierrense F. Parker, 1972
- Diploplectron vierecki Pate, 1941
