= Acalitus plicans =

Scientific classification
- Domain: Eukaryota
- Kingdom: Animalia
- Phylum: Arthropoda
- Subphylum: Chelicerata
- Class: Arachnida
- Family: Eriophyidae
- Genus: Acalitus
- Species: A. plicans

Binomial name
- Acalitus plicans (Nalepa, 1917)

Synonyms
- Eriophyes plicans Nalepa, 1917; Cecydoptes plicans

Species of mite

Acalitus plicans is an eriophyid mite which causes galls on beech (Fagus sylvatica). It is found in Europe and was first described by the Austrian zoologist Alfred Nalepa in 1917.

== Description of the gall ==
The leaf is distorted and crumpled with folds, and is covered with reddish hairs. The reddish tinge resembles an emerging leaf, which together with the small size makes the gall easy to overlook. The mites live and feed among the hairs which are deep in the folds of the leaf and overwinter under the bud scales.

== Inquilines ==
One species of Inquiline is known to live in the gall alongside the gall-causer, and a second may be a gall-causer or an inquiline,

- Epitrimerus fagi
- Monochetus sulcatus – is either a gall-causer on beech or an inquiline of Acalitus plicans.

== Distribution ==
The mite is found in Europe. Countries where it has been recorded include Belgium, Czech Republic, Germany, Great Britain, Latvia, Lithuania, Poland, Russia, (Kaliningrad) and Slovenia.
