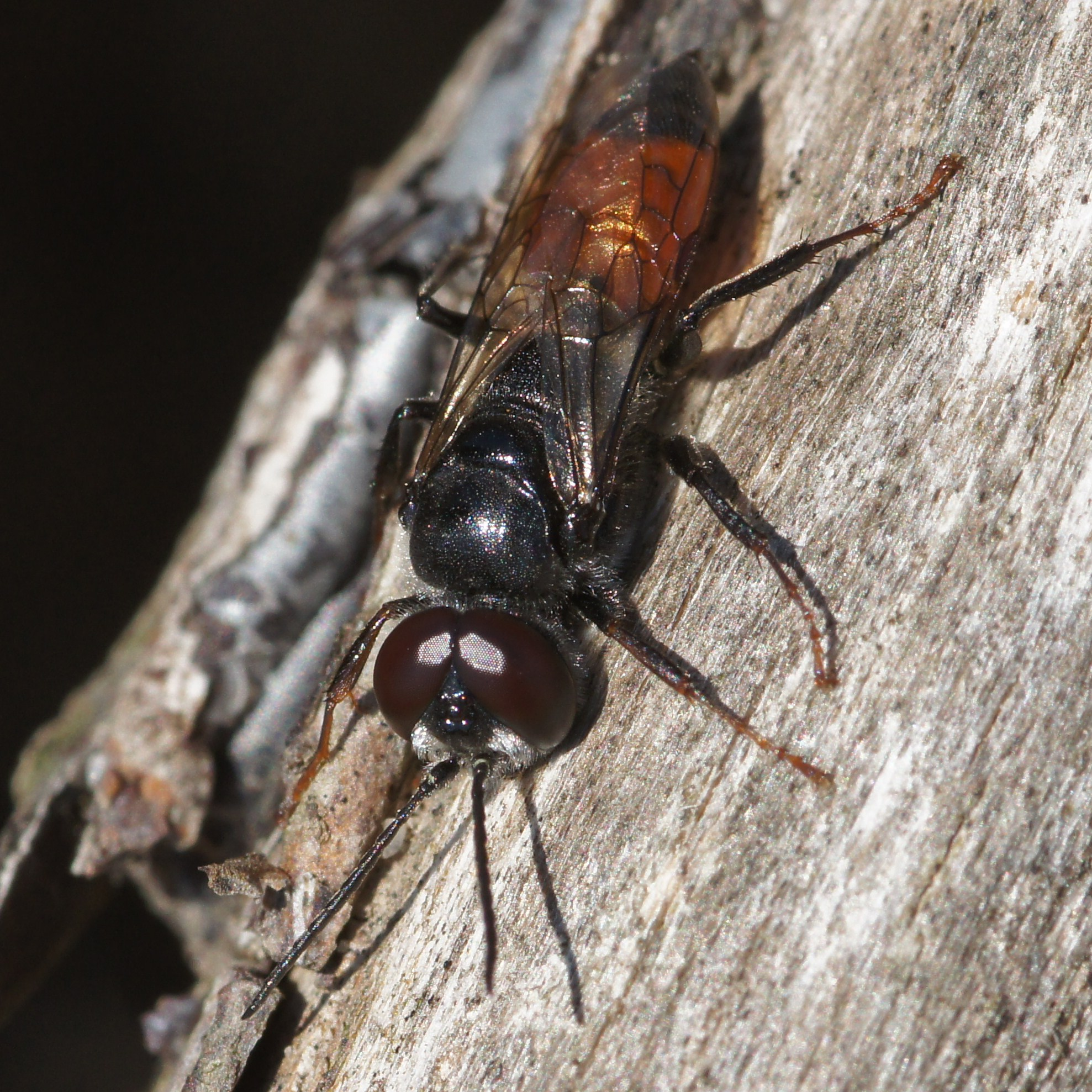
- A male Astata boops in Skane, Sweden

Scientific classification
- Kingdom: Animalia
- Phylum: Arthropoda
- Class: Insecta
- Order: Hymenoptera
- Superfamily: Apoidea
- Family: Astatidae
- Genus: Astata
- Species: A. boops

Binomial name
- Astata boops (Schrank, 1781)

Synonyms
- Sphex boops Schrank, 1781; Astatus boops (Schrank, 1781); Tiphia abdominalis Panzer, 1798; Dimorpha abdominalis (Panzer, 1798); Astata abdominalis (Panzer, 1798); Astata agilis F. Smith, 1875; Astata fuscipes Robert, 1833; Dimorpha oculata Jurine, 1807 o; Astata boops oculata (Jurine, 1807); Astatus boops oculatus (Jurine, 1807)

= Astata boops =

Species of wasp

Astata boops is a Palearctic species of solitary wasp. It is associated with sandy habitats and preys on the nymphs of pentatomid bugs.
