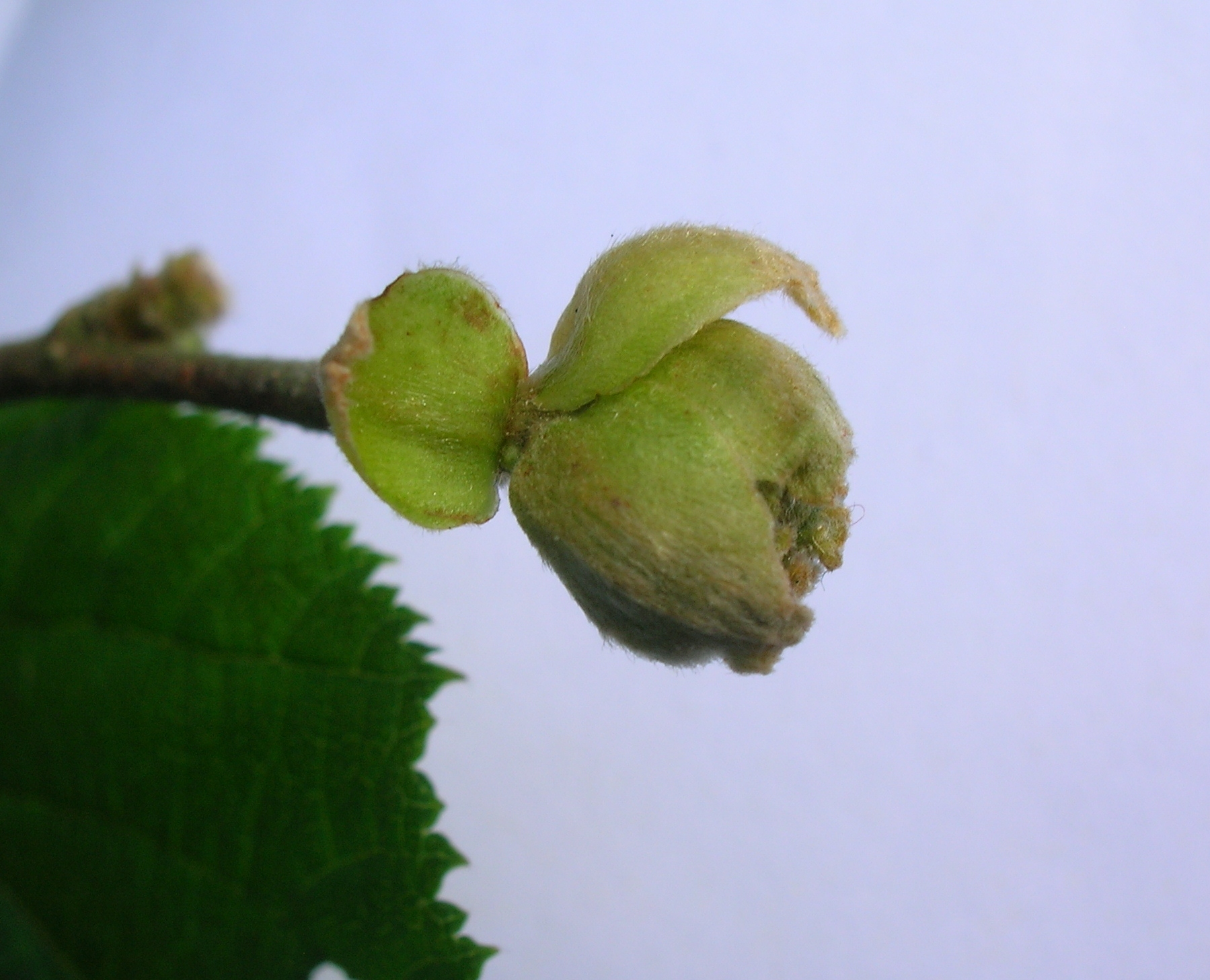
- Phytoptus avellanae gall on hazel

Scientific classification
- Kingdom: Animalia
- Phylum: Arthropoda
- Subphylum: Chelicerata
- Class: Arachnida
- Order: Trombidiformes
- Family: Eriophyidae
- Genus: Phytoptus; Dujardin, 1851

Diversity
- 35 species

= Phytoptus =

Genus of mites

Phytoptus is a genus of mites in the family Phytoptidae.

== Taxonomy ==
As of February 2024, Phytoptus has three synonyms, Calycophthora Amerling, 1862, Phylloptus Amerling, 1858, and Phytocoptella Newkirk & Keifer, 1971, and there are the following 35 species in the genus:

- Phytoptus abnormis Garman, 1883
- Phytoptus adenostomae Keifer, 1976
- Phytoptus alchemillae Jočić et al., 2011
- Phytoptus aquatilis Roivainen, 1950
- Phytoptus atherodes Chetverikov, 2011
- Phytoptus avellanae Nalepa, 1889
- Phytoptus breyniae Mohanasundaram, 1981
- Phytoptus bursarius (Nalepa, 1918)
- Phytoptus cailloli (Cotte, 1924)
- Phytoptus caricis (Lehtola, 1940)
- Phytoptus chamaebatiae (Keifer, 1975)
- Phytoptus coryli Frauenfeld, 1865
- Phytoptus cylindricus Roivainen, 1951
- Phytoptus dehesae Roivainen, 1953
- Phytoptus eletariae Mohanasundaram, 1981
- Phytoptus erinotes (Nalepa, 1918)
- Phytoptus eupadi Newkirk, 1984
- Phytoptus formosanus Wang & Huang, 2011
- Phytoptus hedericola Keifer, 1943
- Phytoptus hirtae Roivainen, 1950
- Phytoptus lateannulatus Schultze, 1918
- Phytoptus liroi Roivainen, 1947
- Phytoptus maritimus Roivainen, 1950
- Phytoptus montanus Keifer, 1954
- Phytoptus monthalensis Smith-Meyer, 1991
- Phytoptus nalepi Zaher & Abou-Awad, 1979
- Phytoptus nervalis Nalepa, 1918
- Phytoptus niloticus Abou-Awad, 1981
- Phytoptus piceae Roivainen, 1951
- Phytoptus rigidus Roivainen, 1950
- Phytoptus rosae Mohanasundaram, 1981
- Phytoptus stenoporus (Nalepa, 1918)
- Phytoptus swalesi Keifer, 1966
- Phytoptus swazilandicus Smith-Meyer, 1991
- Phytoptus tetratrichus (Nalepa, 1891)
