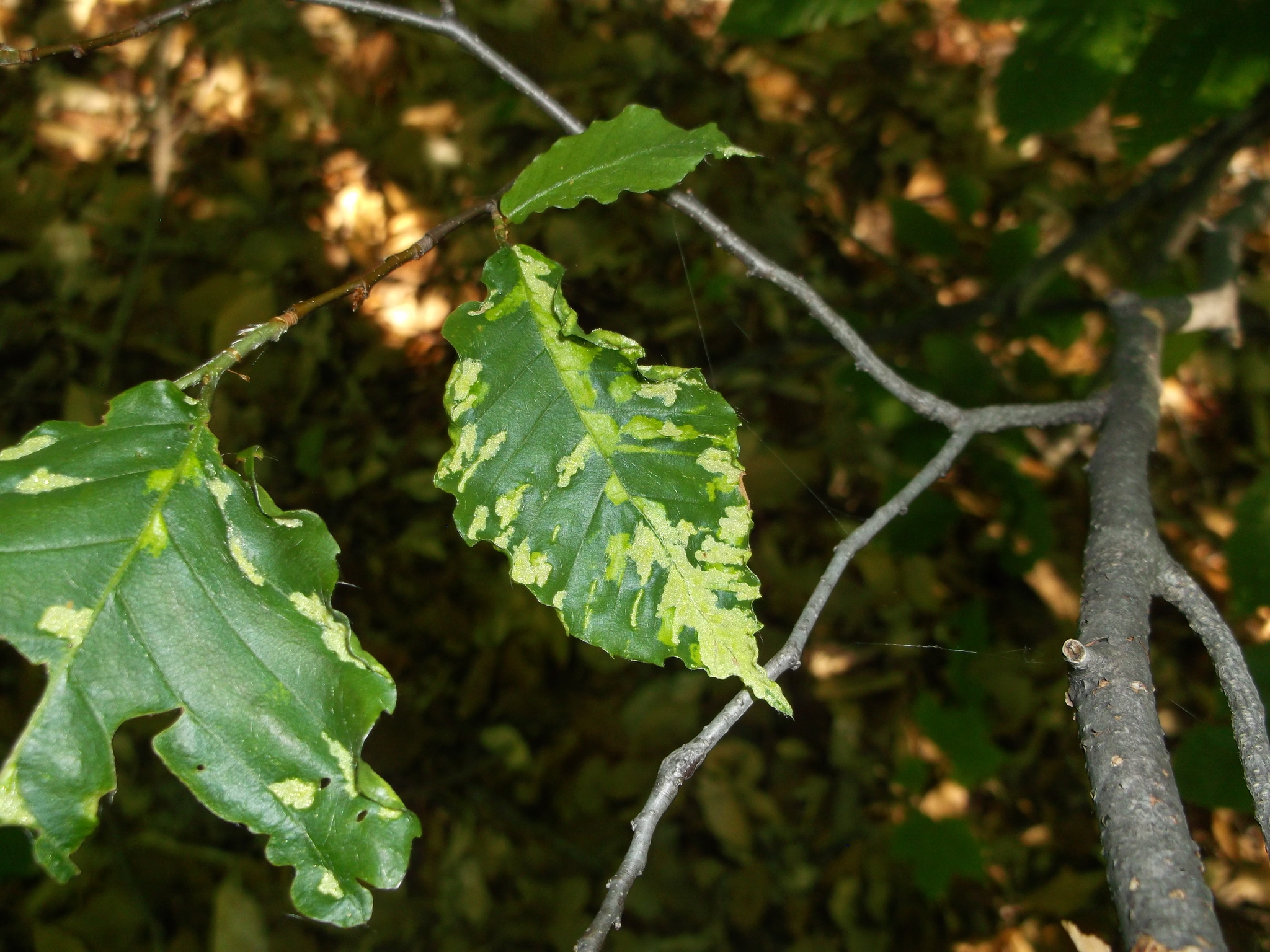
- Leaves of Fagus grandifolia exhibiting galls caused by the mite Acalitus ferrugineum

Scientific classification
- Domain: Eukaryota
- Kingdom: Animalia
- Phylum: Arthropoda
- Subphylum: Chelicerata
- Class: Arachnida
- Family: Eriophyidae
- Genus: Acalitus
- Species: A. ferrugineum

Binomial name
- Acalitus ferrugineum Farlow & Hagen, 1885

= Acalitus ferrugineum =

Species of mite

Acalitus ferrugineum is a species of eriophyid mite. This microscopic organism induces erineum galls on the leaves of American beech, and is known from the United States and Canada.

== Description of the gall ==
Leaves affected by this species of mite will present with pale or light yellow erineum patches which progress into a reddish-brown later in the season. These galls are not known to have any consequences on the health of the tree beyond aesthetics.
