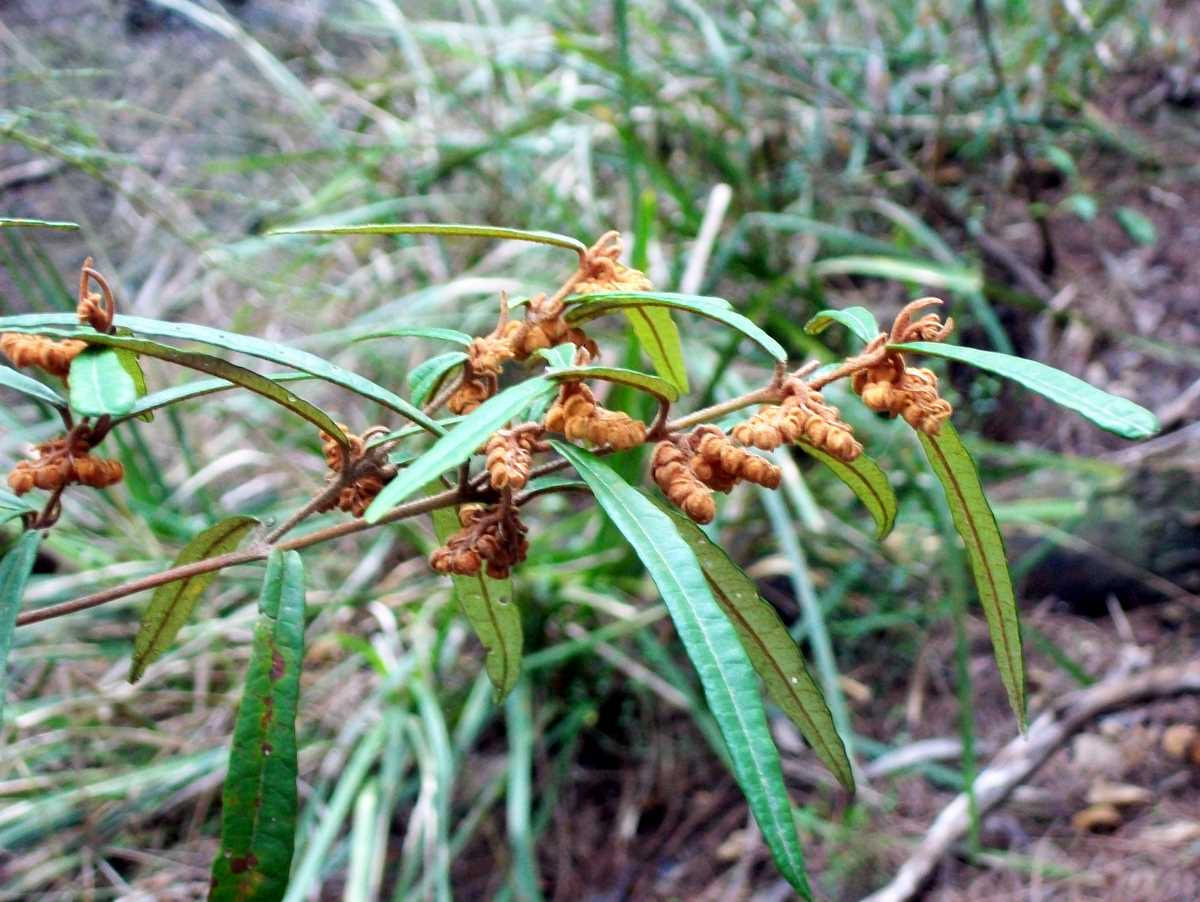
- Lasiopetalum ferrugineum growing by the Lane Cove River, Australia

Scientific classification
- Kingdom: Plantae
- Clade: Tracheophytes
- Clade: Angiosperms
- Clade: Eudicots
- Clade: Rosids
- Order: Malvales
- Family: Malvaceae
- Genus: Lasiopetalum
- Species: L. ferrugineum

Binomial name
- Lasiopetalum ferrugineum Sm. ex Andrews

= Lasiopetalum ferrugineum =

Rusty velvet-bush

Species of flowering plant

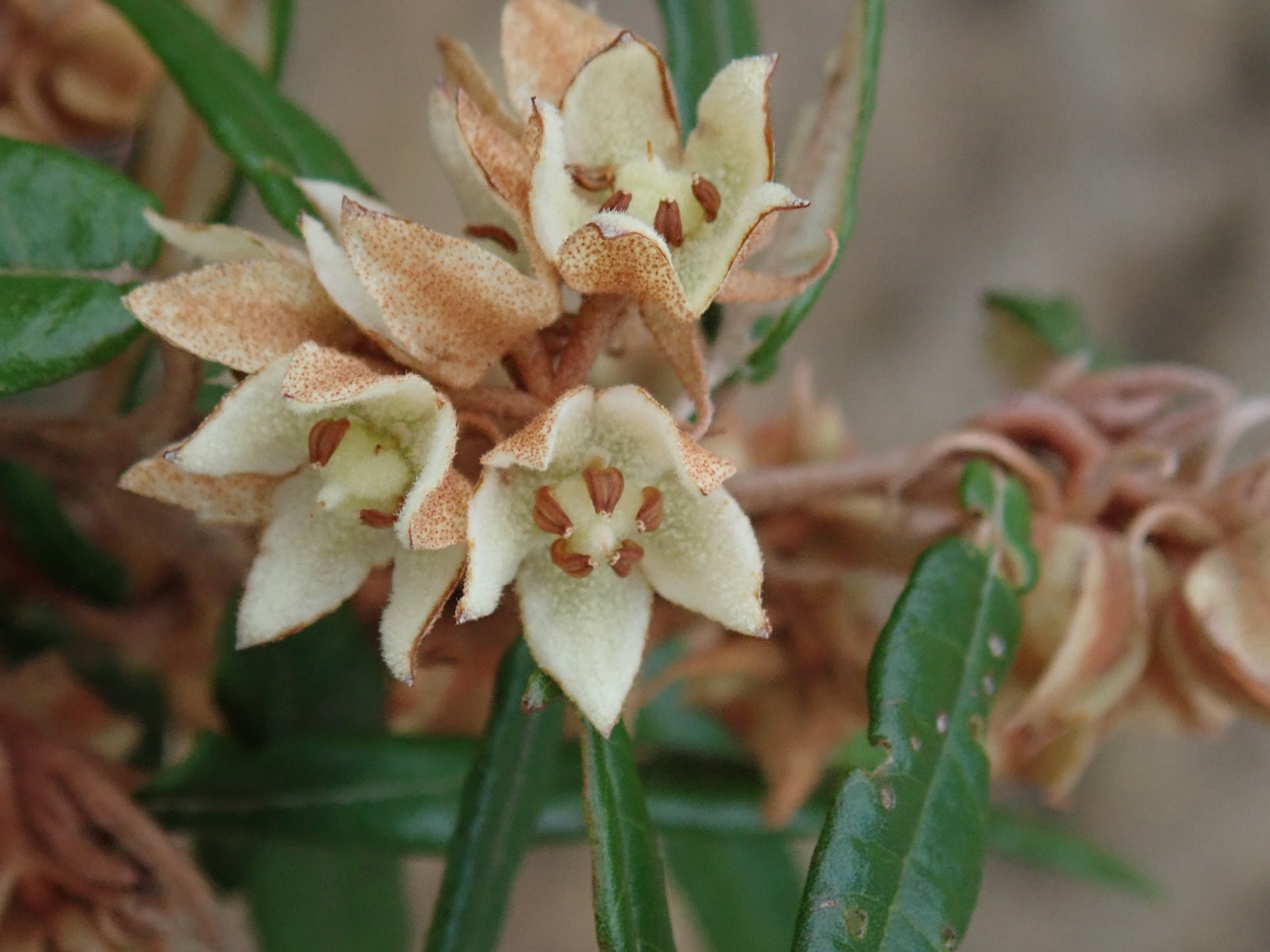
Flowers

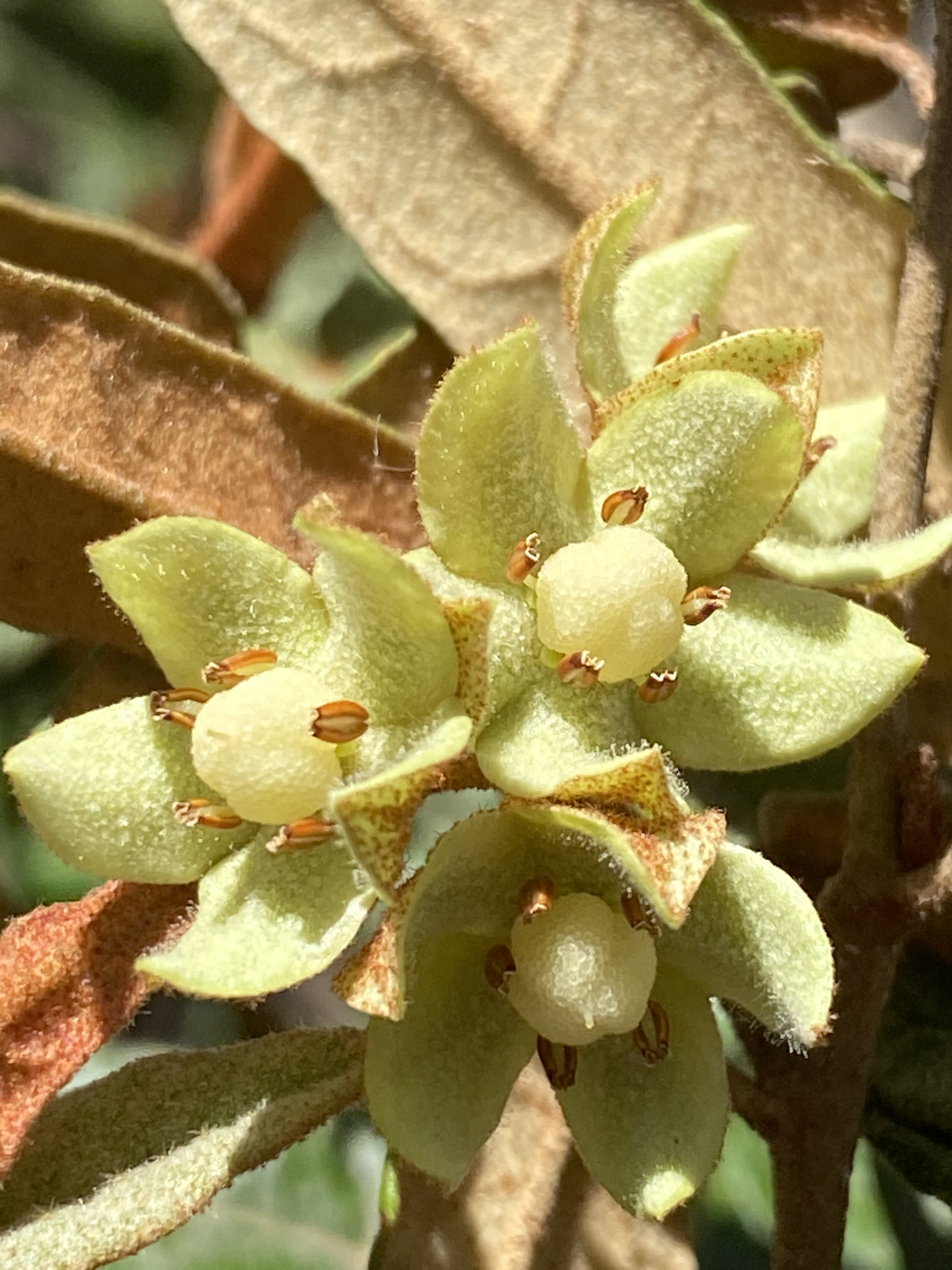
Lasiopetalum ferrugineum var. cordatum growing in bushland near Willow Vale

Lasiopetalum ferrugineum, commonly known as rusty velvet-bush, is a species of flowering plant in the mallow family and is endemic to eastern Australia. Growing up to a metre tall, much of the plant is covered in rusty hairs. It is found in forest and heathland.

== Description ==
Lasiopetalum ferrugineum is a shrub, typically up to 1 m (3.3 ft) high and 1–3 m (3.3–9.8 ft) wide, its new growth covered with red-brown hair. The leaves are narrowly oblong to lance-shaped, 2–12 cm (0.79–4.72 in) long and 0.5–4 cm (0.20–1.57 in) wide on a petiole2–10 mm (0.079–0.394 in) long. The upper surface of the leaves is more or less glabrous and the lower surface covered with woolly, white to rust-coloured hairs. There are prominent veins on both surfaces of the leaves. The flowers are arranged in crowded cymes of five to ten, more or less sessile flowers. The sepals are whitish, 4–10 mm (0.16–0.39 in) long and covered with star-shaped hairs, with three bracteoles 3–5 mm (0.12–0.20 in) long at the base. The petals are reddish-brown and less than 1 mm (0.039 in) long, the anthers also reddish-brown and about 1.5 mm (0.059 in) long. Flowering occurs from September to November, and the fruit is a capsule about 4 mm (0.16 in) in diameter.

== Taxonomy ==
Lasiopetalum ferrugineum was first formally described by Henry Cranke Andrews in his 1802 work The Botanist's Repository for New, and Rare Plants, from an unpublished description by James Edward Smith. The description was based on a plant grown in 1796, in the Vineyard Nursery of Lee and Kennedy in Hammersmith, London, from seeds collected near Port Jackson. Its species name is derived from the Latin, meaning "rust-coloured".

Two varieties are recognised by the Australian Plant Census:

- Lasiopetalum ferrugineum var. cordatum Benth., that has egg-shaped to lance-shaped leaves mostly more than 10 mm (0.39 in) wide;
- Lasiopetalum ferrugineum Sm. ex Andrews var. ferrugineum, that has narrow elliptic to lance-shaped leaves mostly less than 10 mm (0.39 in) wide.

== Distribution and habitat ==
Rusty velvet-bush is found in sclerophyll forest and heathland and occurs from south-east Queensland through eastern New South Wales and into far-eastern Victoria. It is often a spreading shrub in more expose areas and taller in sheltered areas and gullies. It prefers sandy soils.

== Use in horticulture ==
The flushes of rust-coloured new growth of this species have some ornamental appeal. It grows fairly readily in part-shade in the garden, and is propagated by seed or cutting.
