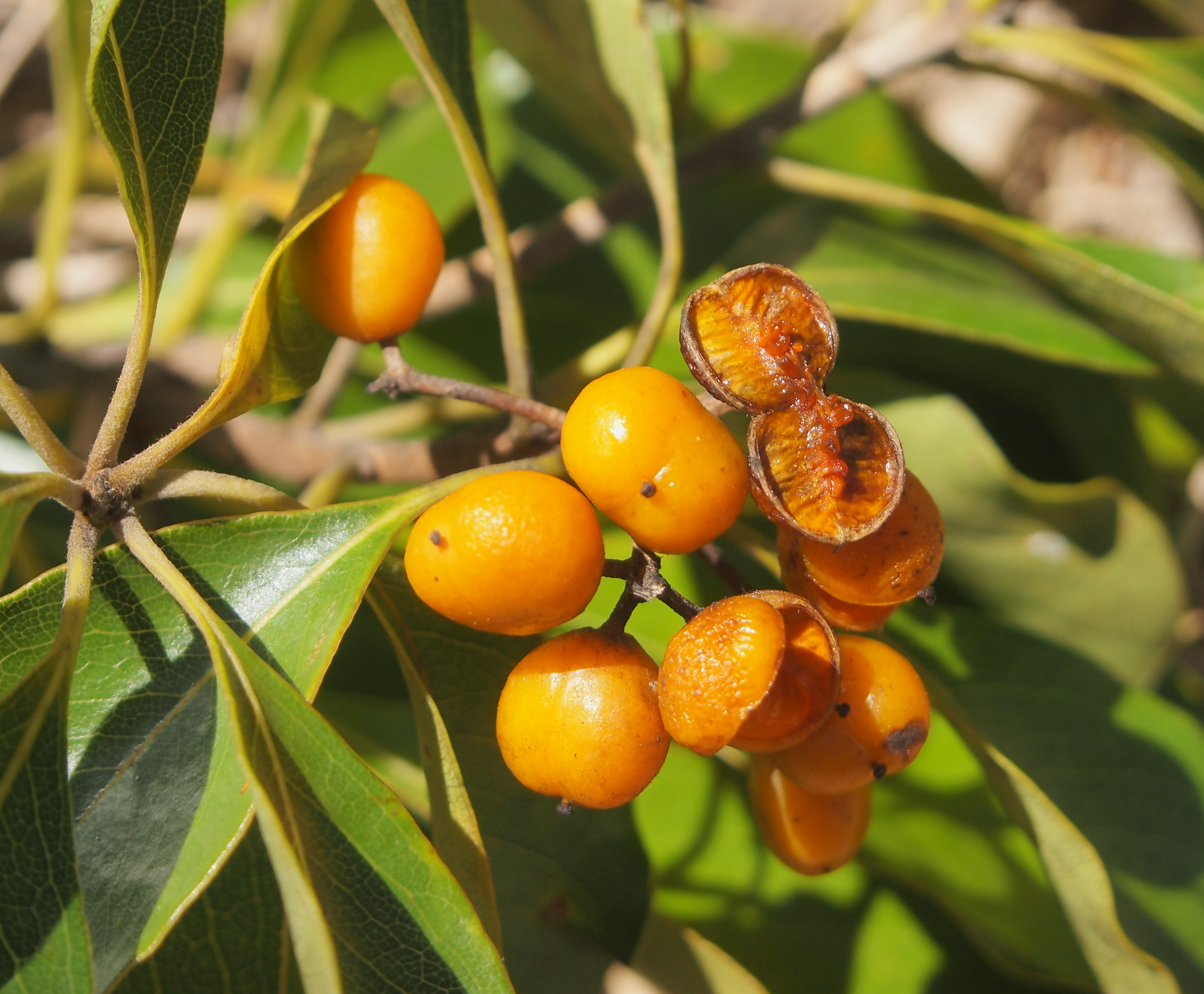
- Fruit

Conservation status
- Least Concern (NCA)

Scientific classification
- Kingdom: Plantae
- Clade: Tracheophytes
- Clade: Angiosperms
- Clade: Eudicots
- Clade: Asterids
- Order: Apiales
- Family: Pittosporaceae
- Genus: Pittosporum
- Species: P. ferrugineum

Binomial name
- Pittosporum ferrugineum W.T.Aiton

Synonyms
- Itea javanica Blume; Pittosporum ferrugineum var. javanicum Boerl.; Pittosporum javanicum Blume; Pittosporum kusaiense Kaneh.; Pittosporum nativitatis Baker f.; Pittosporum ovatifolium F.Muell.; Pittosporum ponapense Kaneh.; Pittosporum rufescens Turcz.; Pittosporum versteeghii Merr. & L.M.Perry

= Pittosporum ferrugineum =

Rusty pittosporum

Species of flowering plant

Pittosporum ferrugineum, commonly known as the rusty pittosporum or rusty-leaved pittosporum, is an evergreen plant in the family Pittosporaceae native to Malesia, Papuasia, the Northern Territory and Queensland.

== Description ==
Pittosporum ferrugineum is a shrub or small tree growing to around 10 m high. The new growth (twigs, leaves and flowers) is densely covered in fine rusty-brown hairs − giving rise to the common name − but becoming less hairy as it matures. Leaves are dull green, elliptic to narrow-elliptic, 6–13 cm long by 2–5 cm wide, on a petiole 1.5–2.5 cm long.

The inflorescences are clusters of flowers about 4 cm wide, produced in the leaf axils at any time of the year. The fragrant flowers have five petals, measure about 10 mm long and wide, and are white, cream or yellow in colour.

The dull yellow or orange fruit is a dehiscent 2-valved capsule containing up to 16 small red seeds aggregated into a sticky ball.

== Taxonomy ==
This species was first described − albeit very briefly − and named in 1811 by the English botanist William Townsend Aiton in the book Hortus Kewensis.

=== Subspecies ===
There are two subspecies of this taxon recognised by Plants of the World Online (POWO) − P.f. laxiflorum Schodde, and the autonym P.f. ferrugineum. A former subspecies − P.f. linifolium was elevated to species status in 2017 under the combination Pittosporum tinifolium.

=== Etymology ===
The species epithet ferrugineum is from the Latin ferrugineus, meaning "of the colour of rust", and was given to this species by Aiton in reference to the dense red-brown hairs on the plant.

== Distribution and habitat ==
The rusty-leaved pittosporum is found in Malesia, Papuasia and northern Australia, with records from Malaysia, Borneo, Sulawesi, the Philippines, the Caroline Islands, Java, Sumatra, Lesser Sunda Islands, the Maluku Islands, New Guinea, the Bismark Archipelago, the Solomon Islands, Christmas Island, the Northern Territory and Queensland (north of Cooktown). It has been introduced to Mauritius, Sri Lanka, Cambodia and Vietnam.

This species is known to inhabit drier rainforest types such as monsoon forest, beach forest and the margins of mangrove forest.

== Ecology ==
The fruit of this species is eaten by metallic starlings (Aplonis metallica). Flowers attract a variety of birds and butterflies.

== Conservation ==
This species is listed by the Queensland Department of Environment and Science as least concern. As of 21 February 2023, it has not been assessed by the IUCN.

== Gallery ==
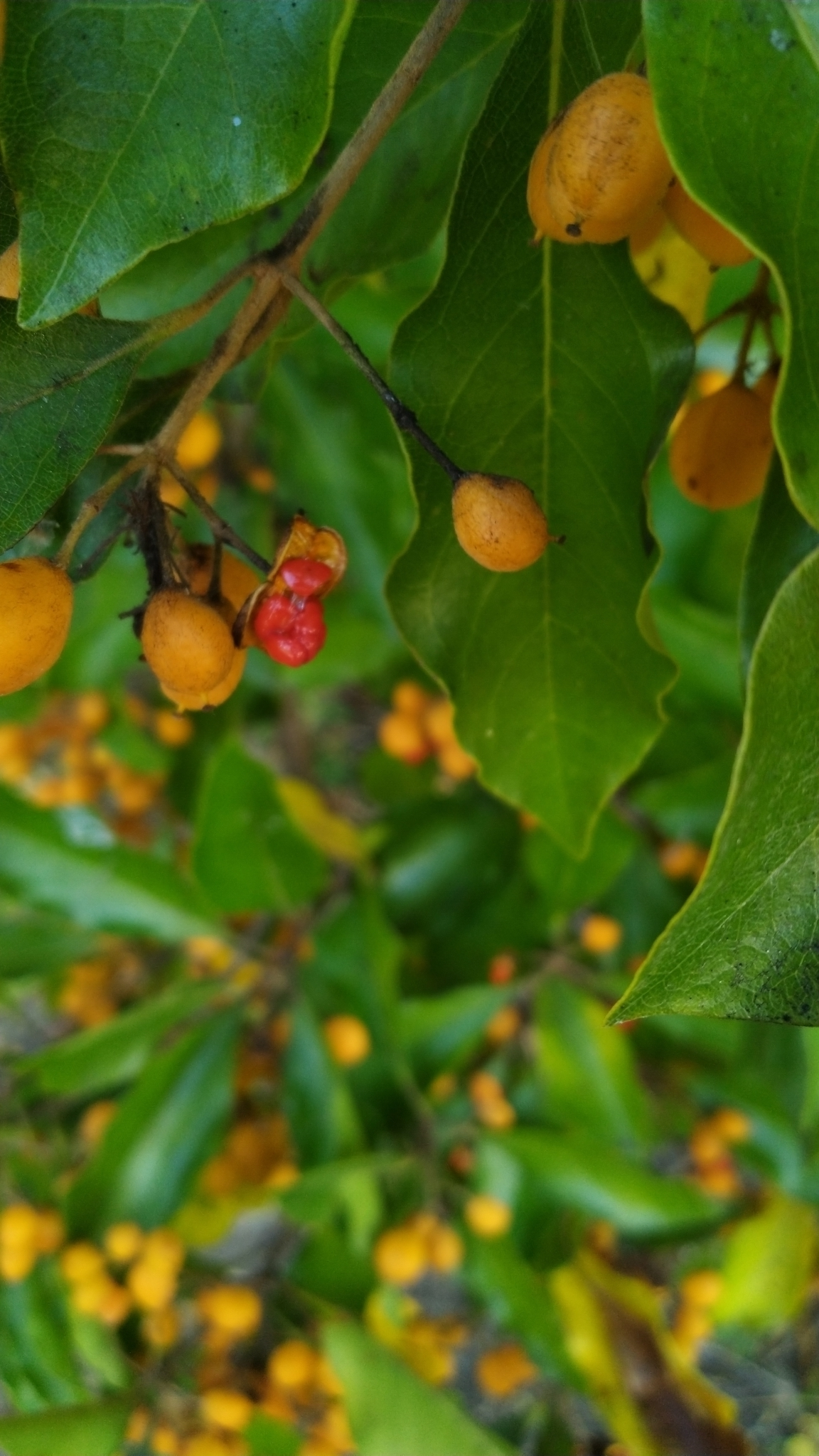
An opened fruit showing seeds

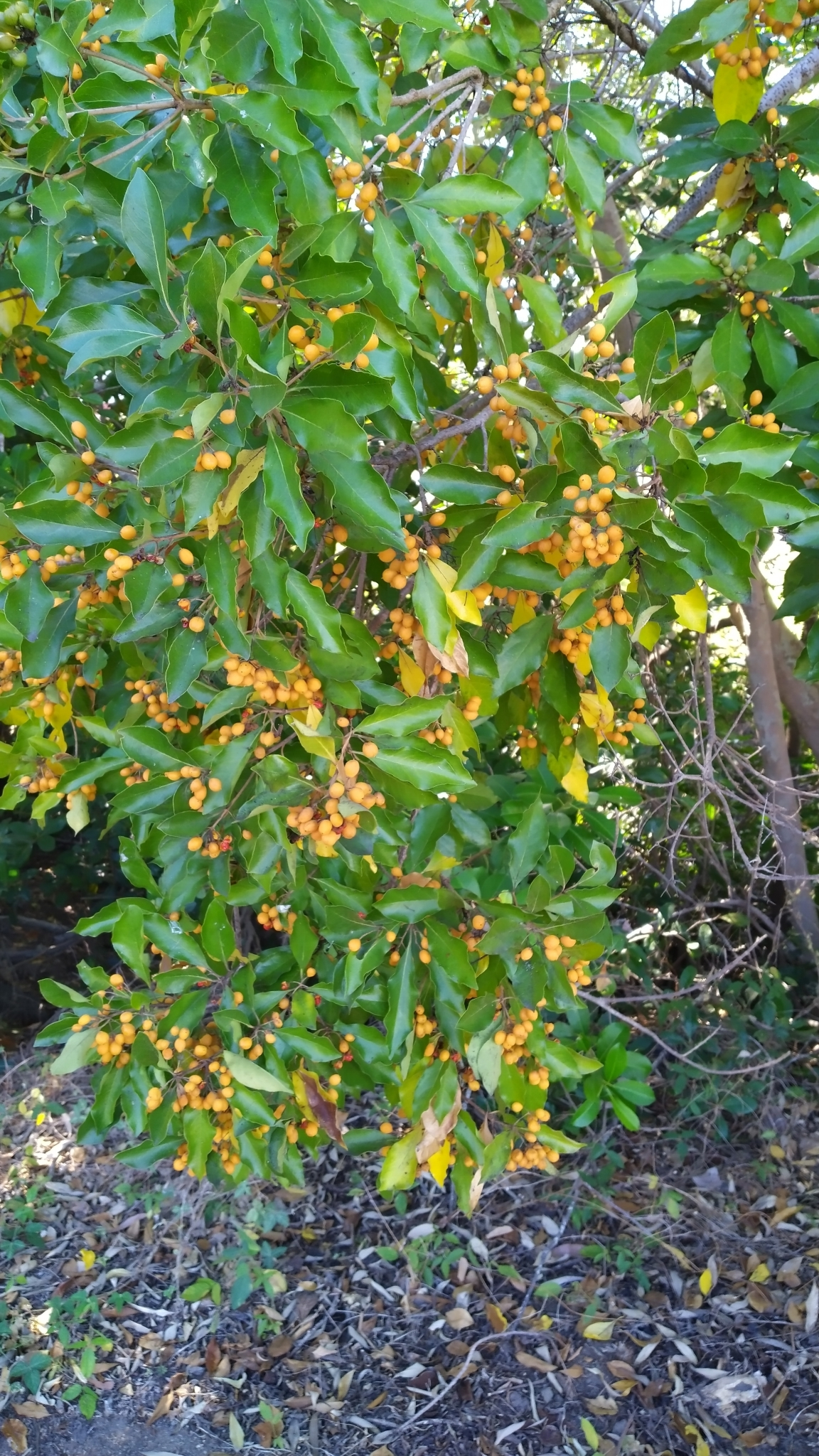
Shrub laden with fruit

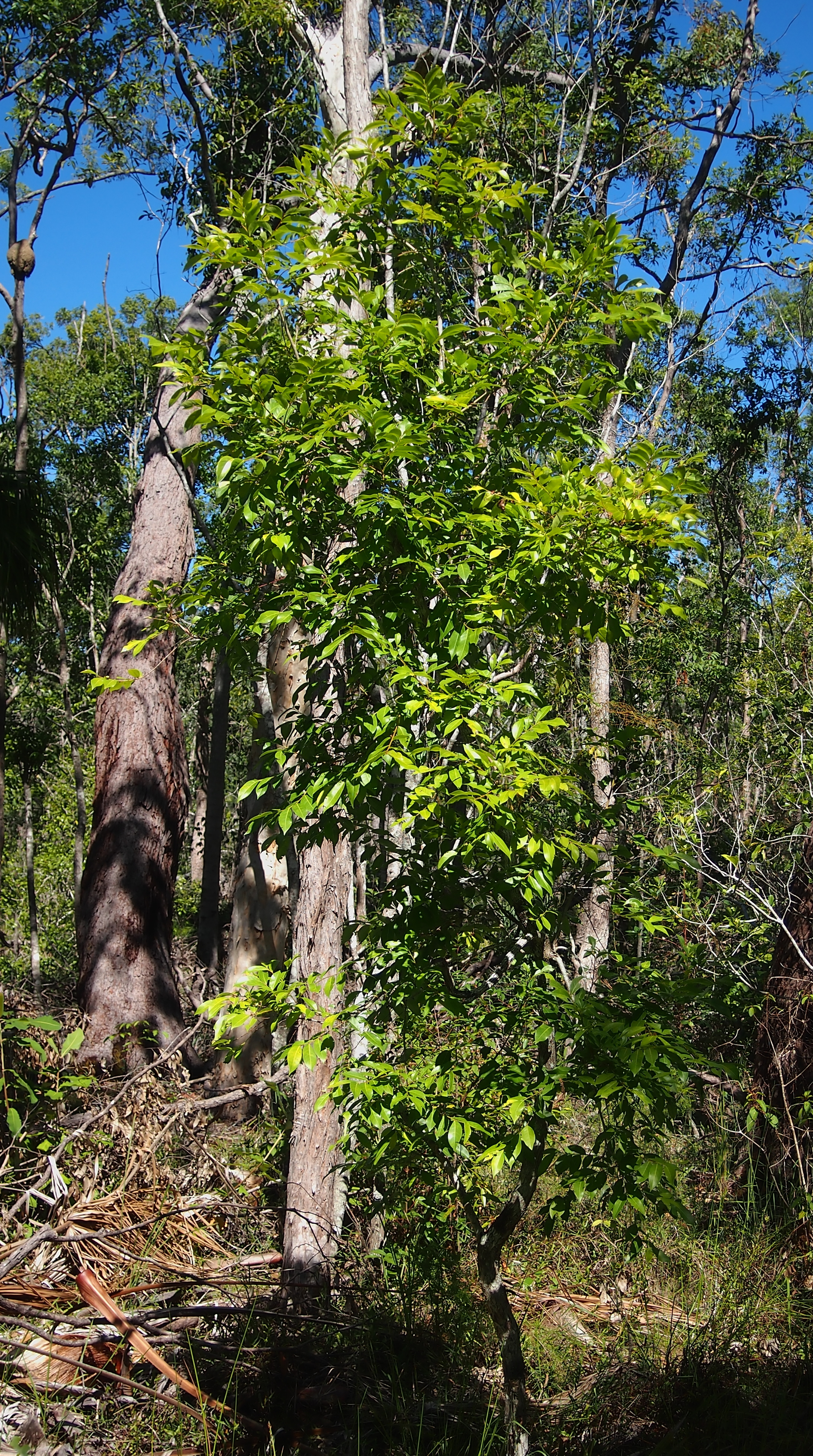
Near Yeppoon, central Queensland

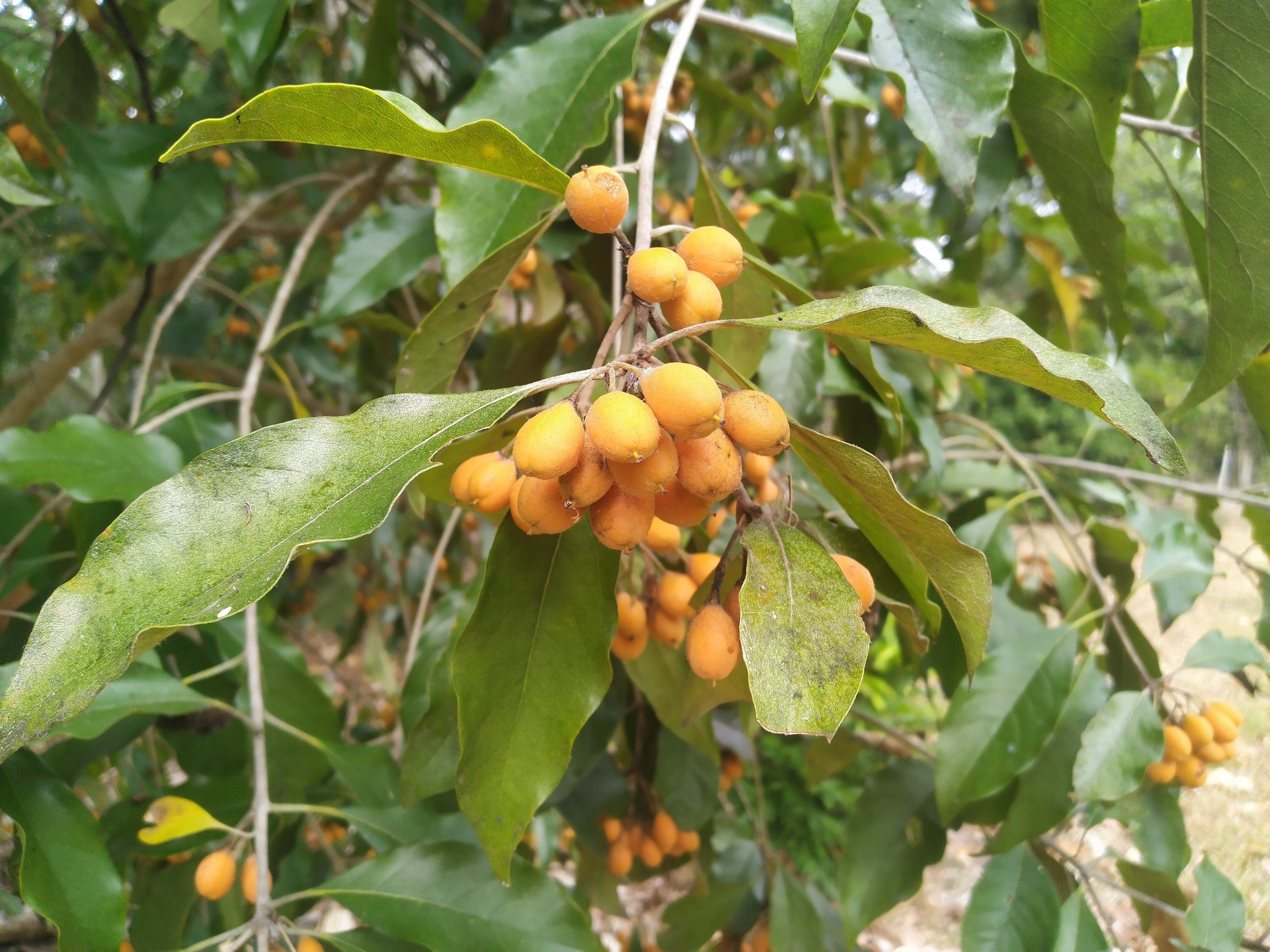
Close up of fruit

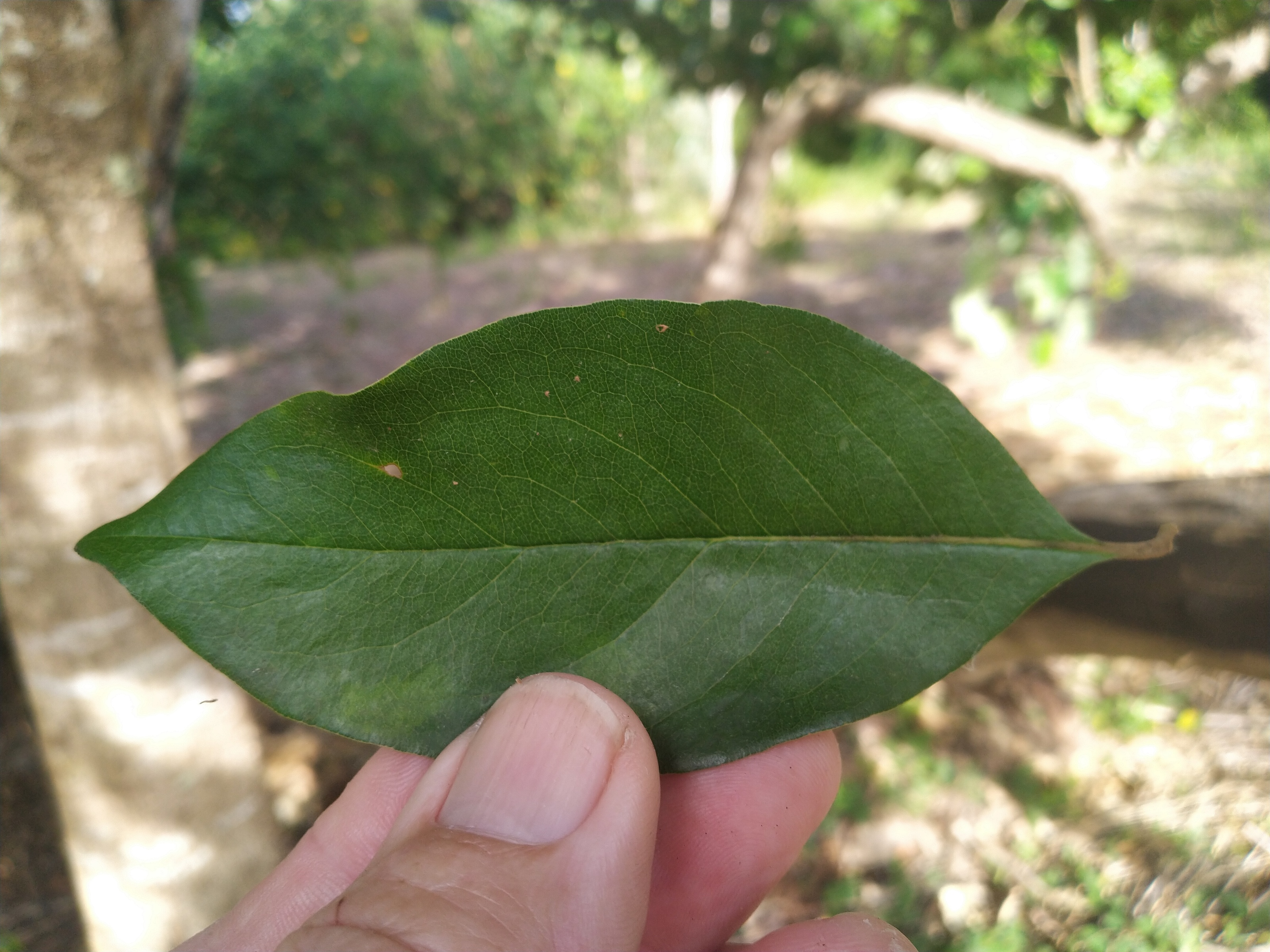
Leaf, top side

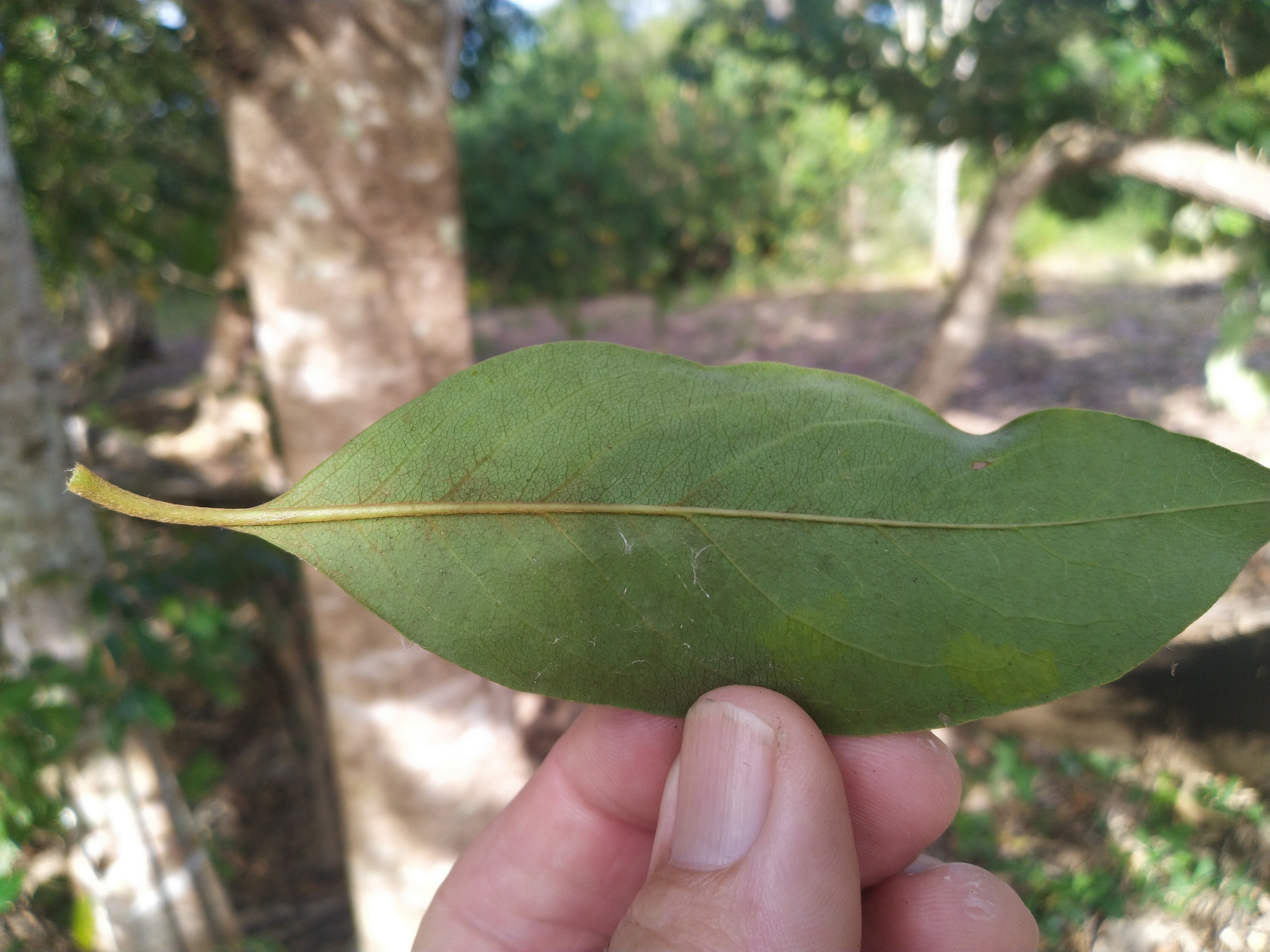
Leaf, underside
