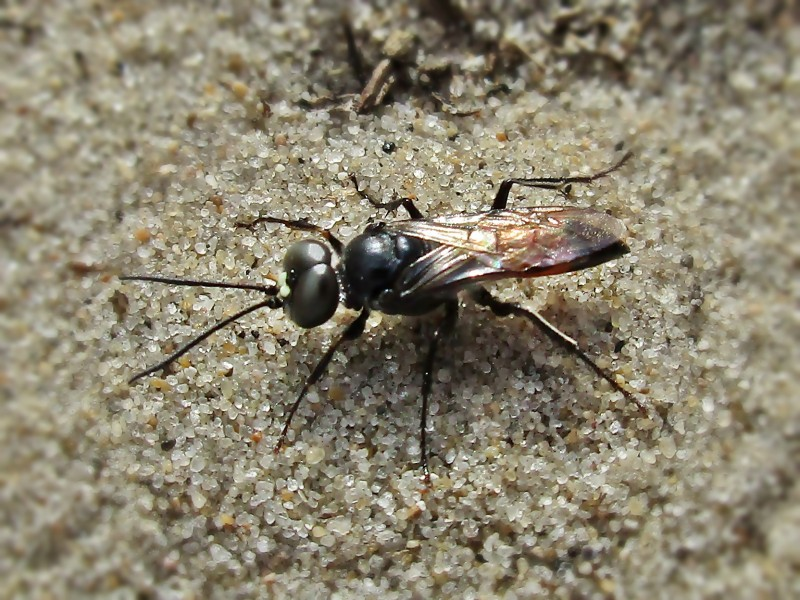
- Dryudella stigma

Scientific classification
- Kingdom: Animalia
- Phylum: Arthropoda
- Clade: Pancrustacea
- Class: Insecta
- Order: Hymenoptera
- Family: Astatidae
- Genus: Dryudella; Spinola, 1843

= Dryudella =

Genus of wasps

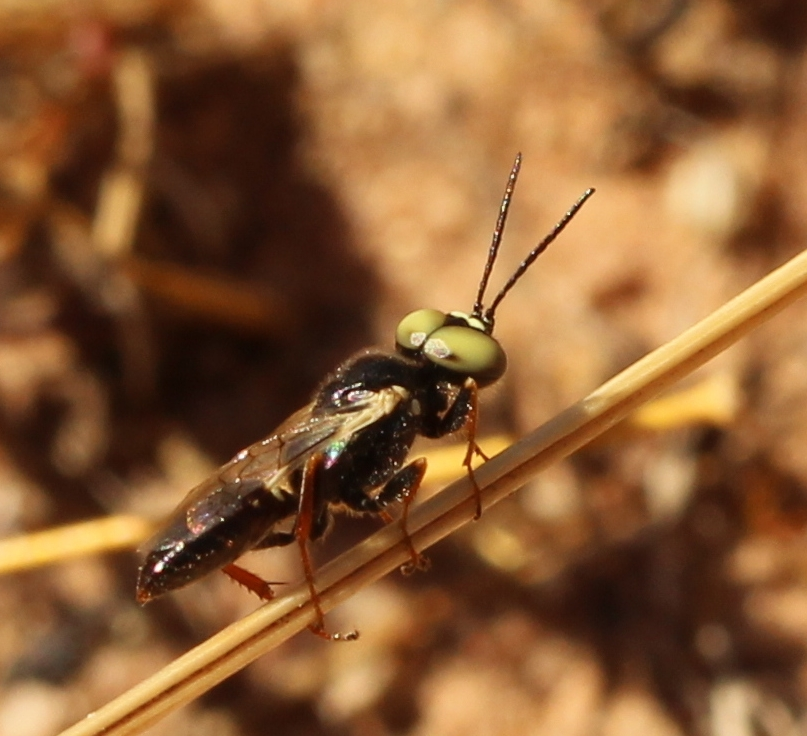
Dryudella flavoundata, male

Dryudella is a genus of wasps in the family Astatidae. There are more than 50 described species in Dryudella.

== Species ==
These 57 species belong to the genus Dryudella:

- Dryudella albohirsuta Kazenas, 2000
- Dryudella amenartais (Pulawski, 1959)
- Dryudella aquitana (Pulawski, 1970)
- Dryudella arabica Schmid-Egger, 2014
- Dryudella aralensis Kazenas, 2000
- Dryudella beaumonti (Pulawski, 1959)
- Dryudella bella (Cresson, 1881)
- Dryudella bidens Kazenas, 2000
- Dryudella bifasciata (von Schulthess, 1926)
- Dryudella caerulea (Cresson, 1881)
- Dryudella deserti Schmid-Egger, 2014
- Dryudella dichoptica Kazenas, 2000
- Dryudella elegans (Cresson, 1881)
- Dryudella erythrosoma (Pulawski, 1959)
- Dryudella esterinae Pagliano, 2001
- Dryudella femoralis (Mocsáry, 1877)
- Dryudella flavoundata (Arnold, 1923)
- Dryudella freygessneri (Carl, 1920)
- Dryudella frontalis (Radoszkowski, 1877)
- Dryudella immigrans (F. Williams, 1940)
- Dryudella kaplini Kazenas, 2000
- Dryudella kaszabi (Tsuneki, 1971)
- Dryudella kazakhstanica Kazenas, 2000
- Dryudella lineata Mocsáry, 1879
- Dryudella lucinda (Nurse, 1904)
- Dryudella maculifrons (Cameron, 1899)
- Dryudella maroccana (Giner Marí, 1946)
- Dryudella millsi Cockerell, 1914
- Dryudella mitjaevi Kazenas, 2000
- Dryudella mongolica (Tsuneki, 1971)
- Dryudella montana (Cresson, 1881)
- Dryudella monticola (Giner Marí, 1946)
- Dryudella nephertiti (Pulawski, 1959)
- Dryudella nuristanica (Balthasar, 1957)
- Dryudella obo (Tsuneki, 1971)
- Dryudella opaca (Pulawski, 1959)
- Dryudella orientalis (F. Smith, 1856)
- Dryudella osiriaca (Pulawski, 1959)
- Dryudella pernix F. Parker, 1969
- Dryudella picta (Kohl, 1888)
- Dryudella picticornis (Gussakovskij, 1927)
- Dryudella pinguis (Dahlbom, 1832)
- Dryudella pseudofemoralis Nemkov, 1990
- Dryudella pulawskii Schmid-Egger, 2014
- Dryudella quadripunctata (Radoszkowski, 1877)
- Dryudella rasnitsyni Kazenas, 2000
- Dryudella rhimpa F. Parker, 1969
- Dryudella sepulchralis (de Beaumont, 1968)
- Dryudella similis (Gussakovskij, 1927)
- Dryudella stigma (Panzer, 1807)
- Dryudella tegularis (F. Morawitz, 1889)
- Dryudella tobiasi Kazenas, 2000
- Dryudella tricolor (Vander Linden, 1829)
- Dryudella unicolor Schmid-Egger, 2014
- Dryudella vanharteni Schmid-Egger, 2014
- Dryudella veronikae Kazenas, 2000
- Dryudella xanthocera (Pulawski, 1961)
