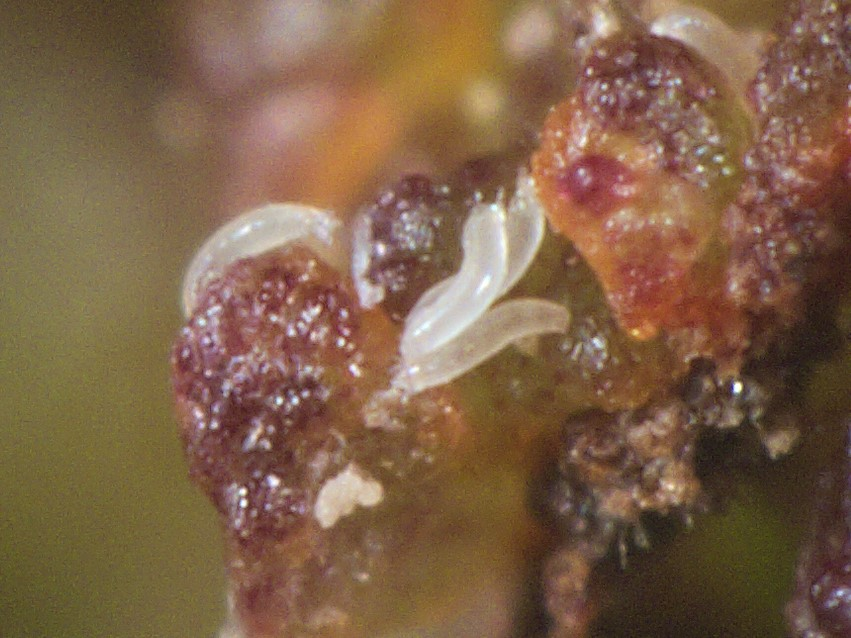

Scientific classification
- Domain: Eukaryota
- Kingdom: Animalia
- Phylum: Arthropoda
- Subphylum: Chelicerata
- Class: Arachnida
- Family: Eriophyidae
- Genus: Phytoptus
- Species: P. avellanae

Binomial name
- Phytoptus avellanae Nalepa, 1889

= Phytoptus avellanae =

Species of mite

Phytoptus avellanae is an acarine gall-mite species inducing big bud galls of up to 10 millimetres (0.39 in) across, sometimes slightly open, on the buds of hazel (Corylus avellana) and on filbert (Corylus maxima). Synonyms include Phytocoptella avellanae, Eriophyes avellanae, Calycophthora avellanae, Phytoptus coryli, Phytoptus pseudogallarum, and Acarus pseudogallarum. The mites are white, about 0.3 mm long, with numerous tergites and sternites. Two forms of P. avellanae exist, a gall causer and a vagrant form that has a more complex life-cycle and does not form galls.

Common names include - DE: Haselnussgallmilbe, Haselnuss-Knospengallmilbe, ES: Badoc del avellano, FR: Phytopte du noisetier, IT: Eriofide del nocciolo, GB: Filbert bud mite, Hazelnut gall mite, TR: Fındık kozalak akarı.

== Galls ==
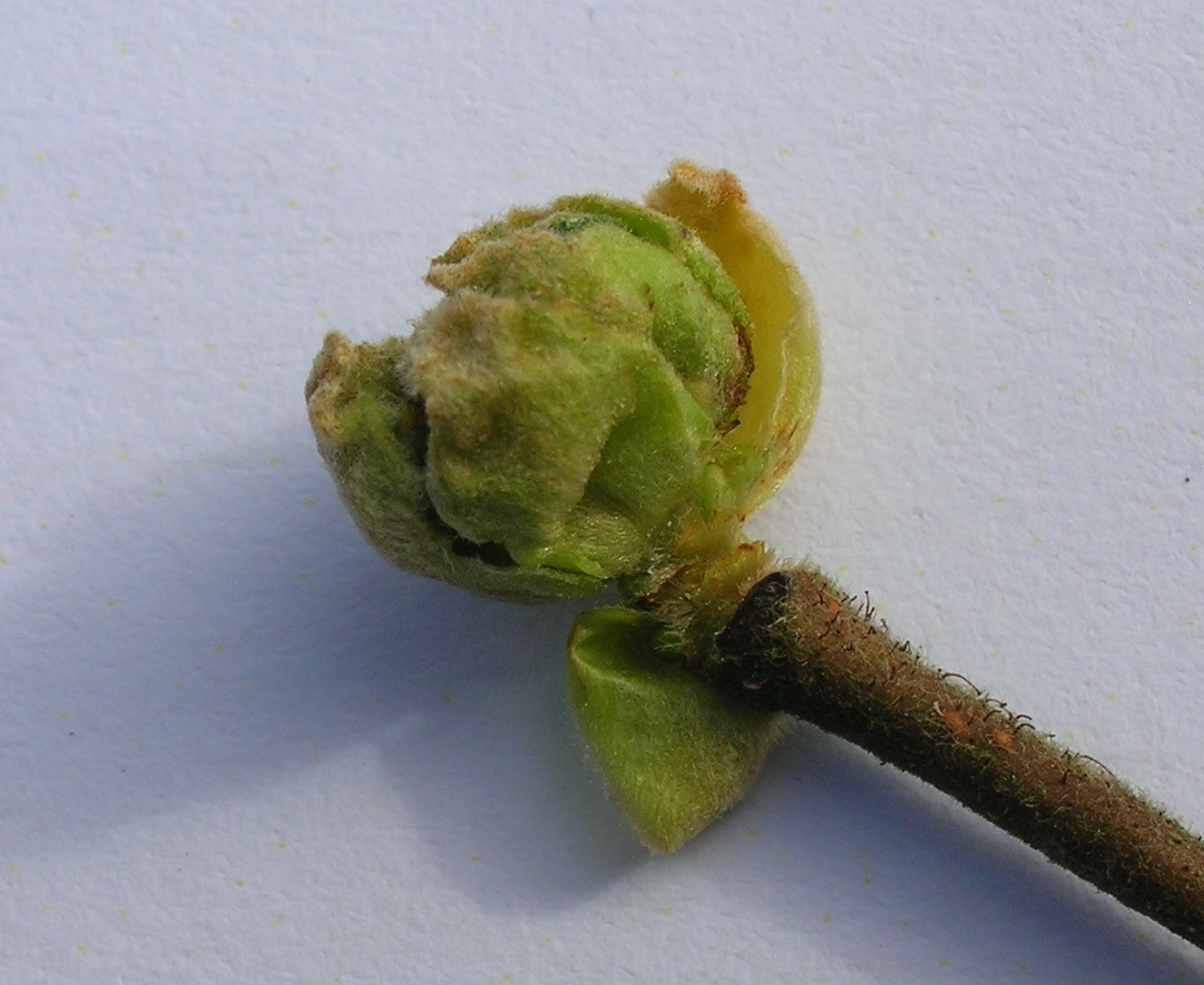
The inner hairy and distorted proto-leaf structure

Hazel big bud galls are generally common, resembling the big bud gall (Cecidophyopsis ribis) on currants (Ribes spp.), develop as a chemically induced distortion of the expanding leaf buds or female flowers on hazel shrubs, caused by the mite Phytoptus avellanae, several hundred of which can live in a single gall within the 20–40 scale leaves. The inner scale-leaves become thickened and distorted, developing a covering of hairs, in amongst which the mites live. Galled buds appear light green at first and turn brown later in the year. If affected the leaves or female flowers fail to develop as a result of the feeding by the gall-mites.

=== Vagrant form ===
The vagrant form of P. avellanae feeds not only on big buds, but also on vegetative and generative parts such as leaves, male and female flowers and completes its life cycle even in the absence of big buds.

== Life cycle ==
In early autumn the gall-mites leave the now reddish-brown bud and migrate to a young bud or commonly a newly formed male catkin where they remain inactive between the flower scales until late winter when the catkins start to elongate. At this stage they feed upon the sap and this causes the scales to swell and open up, the stamens distort and eventually disappear. The female mites leave the buds or catkins in April and seek new buds or female flowers to invade and lay eggs in. The nymphs develop and change into adults in June–July before invading the new buds of the current year's shoots.

== Parasitoids and inquilines ==
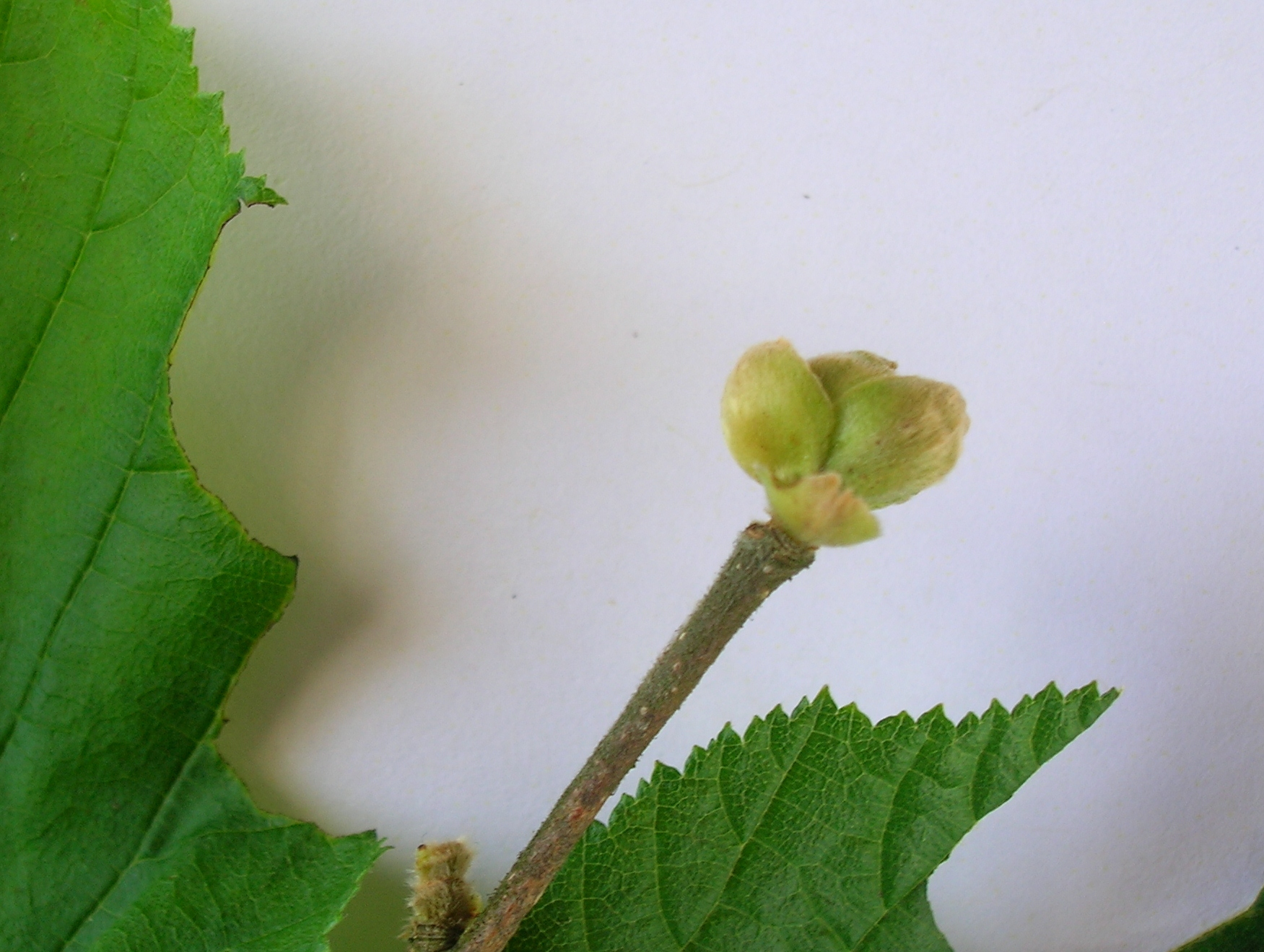
Big bud with open scale leaves

A predatory midge, Arthrocnodax coyligallarum, and a chalcid parasite, Tetrastichus eriophyes are recorded on P. avellanae. An inquiline is the mite Eriophyes vermiformis that otherwise causes crinkling of hazel leaves. Kampimodromus aberrans (Oudemans), is another predator of the big bud mite.

== Agricultural significance ==
This pest causes important reductions in the harvest, especially as the buds destined to give female flowers and fruit seem to be preferentially invaded.
