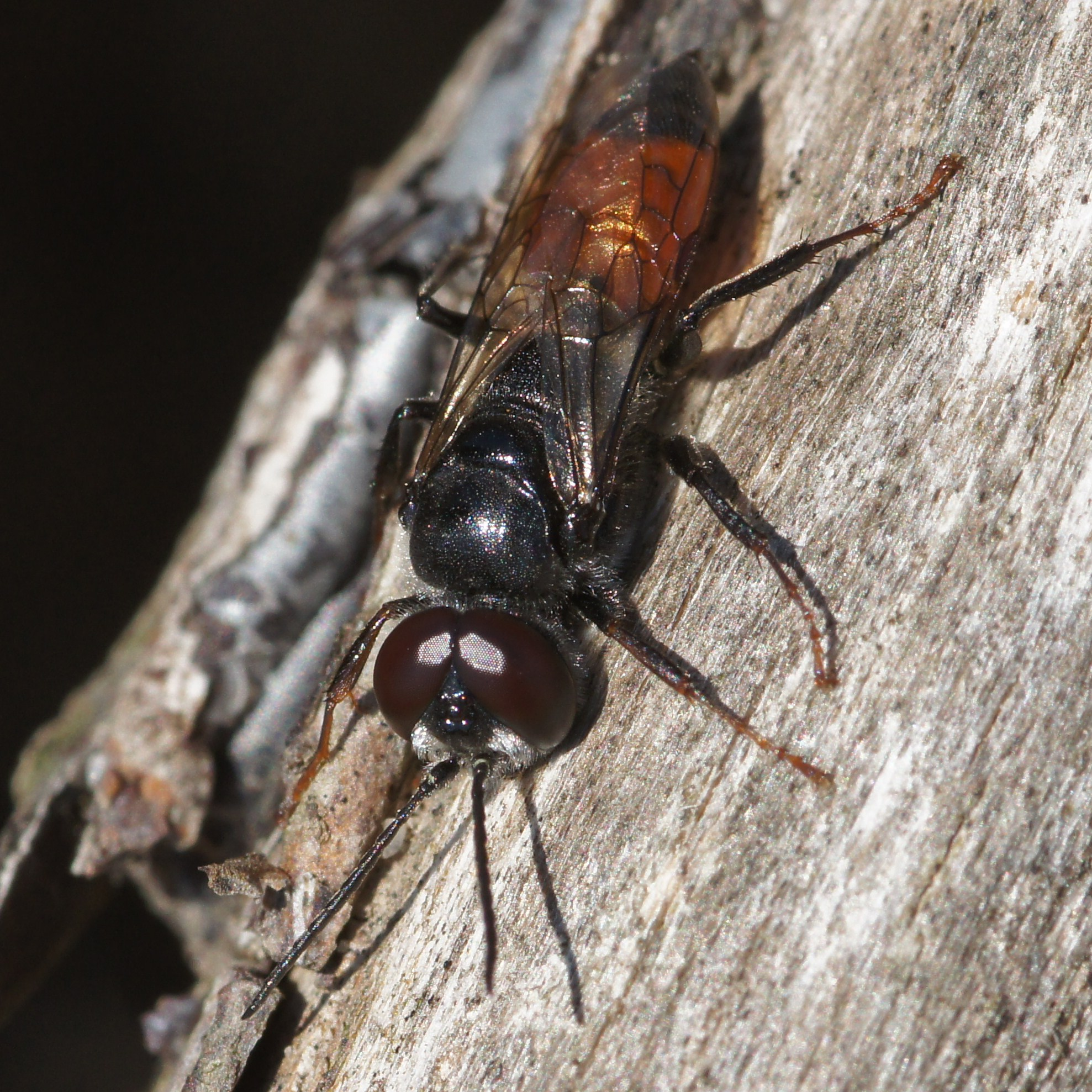
- male of Astata boops

Scientific classification
- Domain: Eukaryota
- Kingdom: Animalia
- Phylum: Arthropoda
- Class: Insecta
- Order: Hymenoptera
- Superfamily: Apoidea
- Family: Astatidae

Genera
- Astata Latreille, 1797; Diploplectron W. Fox, 1893; Dryudella Spinola, 1843; Uniplectron F. Parker, 1966

= Astatidae =

Family of wasps

Astatidae is a cosmopolitan family of solitary wasps, peculiar for their males having very large compound eyes that broadly meet at the top of the head. The largest genus in this family is Astata, with about half of more than 160 species in the family.

Phylogenomic analysis of Apoidea published in 2018 suggested that Astatinae, along with several other subfamilies a tribe and a subtribe, should be promoted to family rank: Ammoplanina to Ammoplanidae, Astatinae to Astatidae, Bembicinae to Bembicidae, Mellininae to Mellinidae, Pemphredoninae (minus Psenini and Ammoplanina) to Pemphredonidae, Philanthinae to Philanthidae, and Psenini to Psenidae.

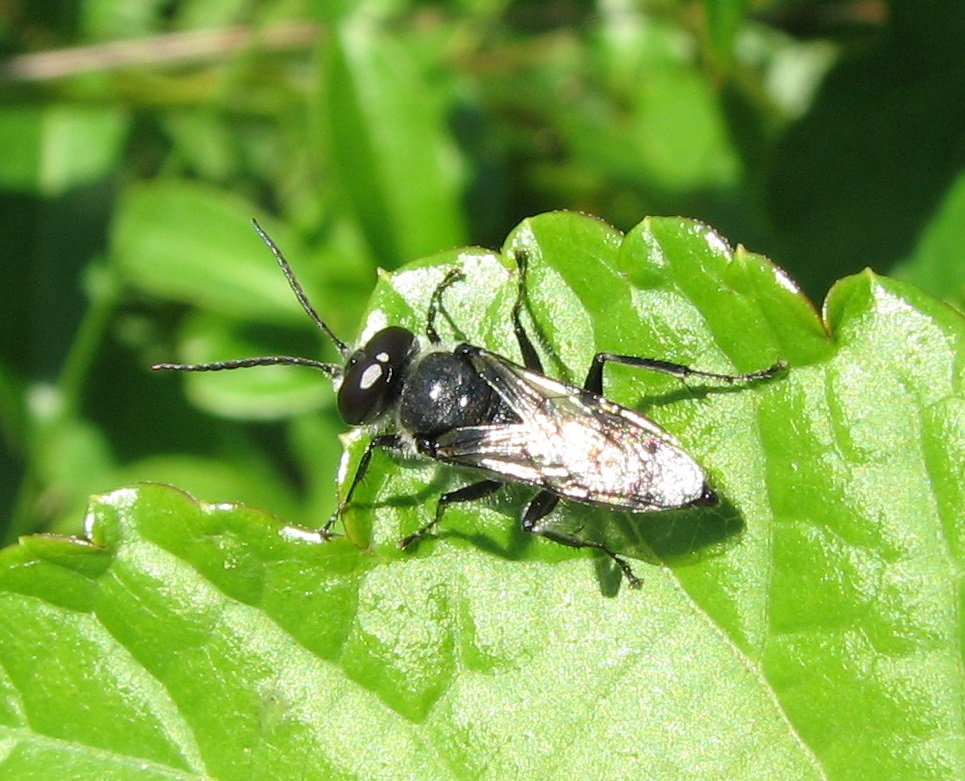
Astata sp., male
