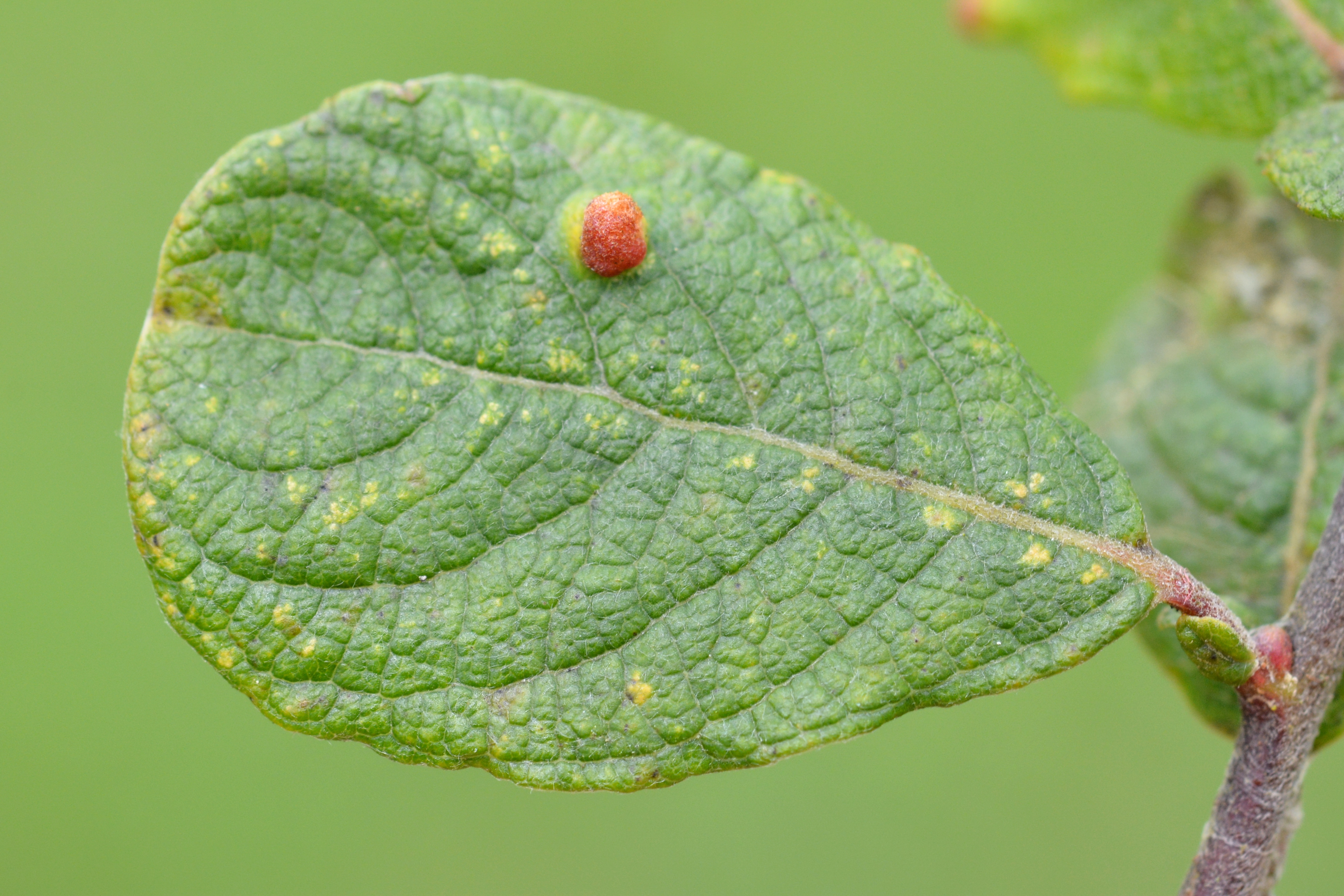
- Aculus laevis gall

Scientific classification
- Kingdom: Animalia
- Phylum: Arthropoda
- Subphylum: Chelicerata
- Class: Arachnida
- Family: Eriophyidae
- Genus: Aculus
- Species: A. laevis

Binomial name
- Aculus laevis (Nalepa, 1892)

Synonyms
- Aceria tetanothrix laevis. Cecidophyes laevis Nalepa, 1892; Eriophyes tetanothrix f. laevis

= Aculus laevis =

Species of mite

Aculus laevis is a species of mite which causes galls on the leaves of sallows (Salix species). It was first described by Alfred Nalepa in 1892.

== Description of the gall ==
The gall is a 1–2 mm pouch on the upper side of the leaves of sallows and their hybrids. At first they are yellowish-green and turn to a reddish-brown later. On the underside of the leaf is an elliptical opening which has protruding hairs and contains a single mite. There can be up to thirty galls on a leaf. The gall has been found on eared willow (S. aurita), goat willow (S. caprea), grey willow (S. cinerea) and their hybrids.

Similar species

The similar galls on the longer leaf willows such as crack willow (S. fragilis), are caused by A. tetanothrix. Redfern et al. (2011) state that the identification of all mite galls on Salix species is tentative and there are probably unnamed species yet to be described. In addition the mites should be verified by an expert.

== Distribution ==
Aculus laevis has been recorded from Austria, Croatia, Finland, France, Germany, Great Britain (England, Scotland and Wales), Hungary, Ireland and Slovenia.
