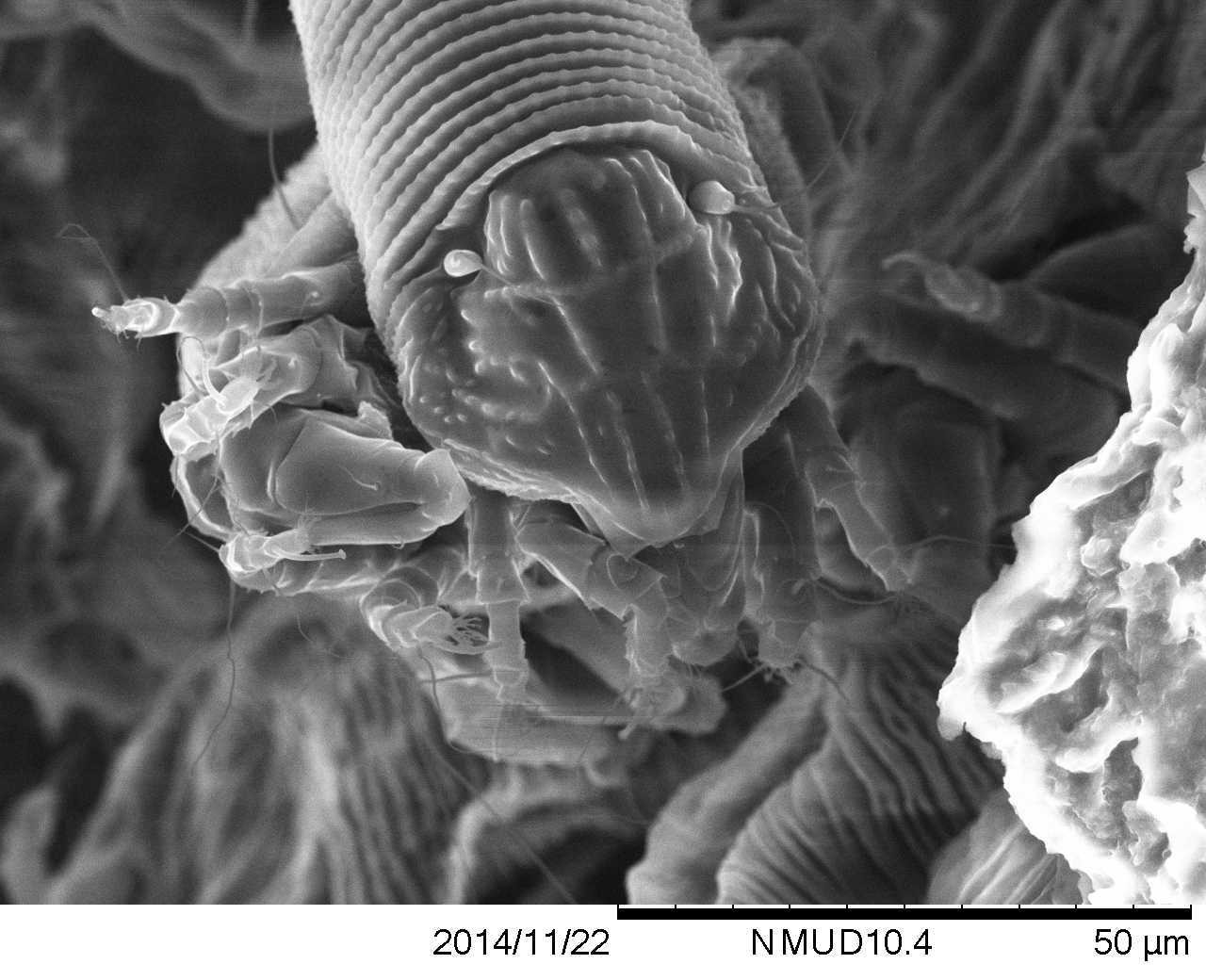

Scientific classification
- Domain: Eukaryota
- Kingdom: Animalia
- Phylum: Arthropoda
- Subphylum: Chelicerata
- Class: Arachnida
- Family: Eriophyidae
- Genus: Aculus
- Species: A. tetanothrix

Binomial name
- Aculus tetanothrix (Nalepa, 1889)

Synonyms
- Aceria tetanothrix Vasates tetanothrix

= Aculus tetanothrix =

Species of mite

Aculus tetanothrix is a species of mite which causes galls on the leaves of willows (Salix species). It was first described by Alfred Nalepa in 1889.

== Description of the gall ==
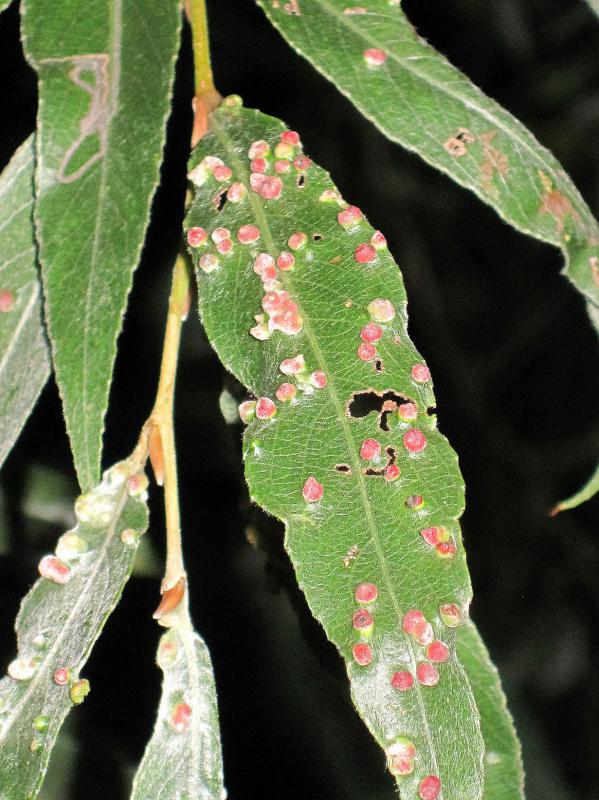
Galls on willow leaves

The gall is a green or reddish, rounded pouch or pustule on the upperside of a leaf, which also protrudes on the lower surface of the leaf. There is a slit-like opening on the underside of the leaf which, when mature, is hairy inside but the hairs do not protrude outside of the gall. Many mites can be seen within the opening.

The galls are found on white willow (S. alba), eared willow (S. aurita), grey willow (S. cinerea), S. eriocephala, crack willow (S. fragilis), S. integra, bay willow (S. pentandra), purple willow (S. purpurea), Sitka willow (S. sitchensis), S. smithiana, almond willow (S. triandra) and common ossier (S. viminalis).

Similar species

It is possible that A. tetanothrix is one of a number of closely related species, and the galls on S. alba could be caused by A. salicisalbae.

== Distribution ==
Aculus tetanothrix has been recorded from Germany, Slovenia, Great Britain (England, Scotland and Wales), the Netherlands, Norway, Russia, Sweden and the USA.
