= White underwing =

White underwing may refer to:

- Catephia alchymista, a species of moth native to Asia, Europe, and North Africa
- Catocala relicta, a species of moth native to Southern Canada
- Catocala, a genus of moths
