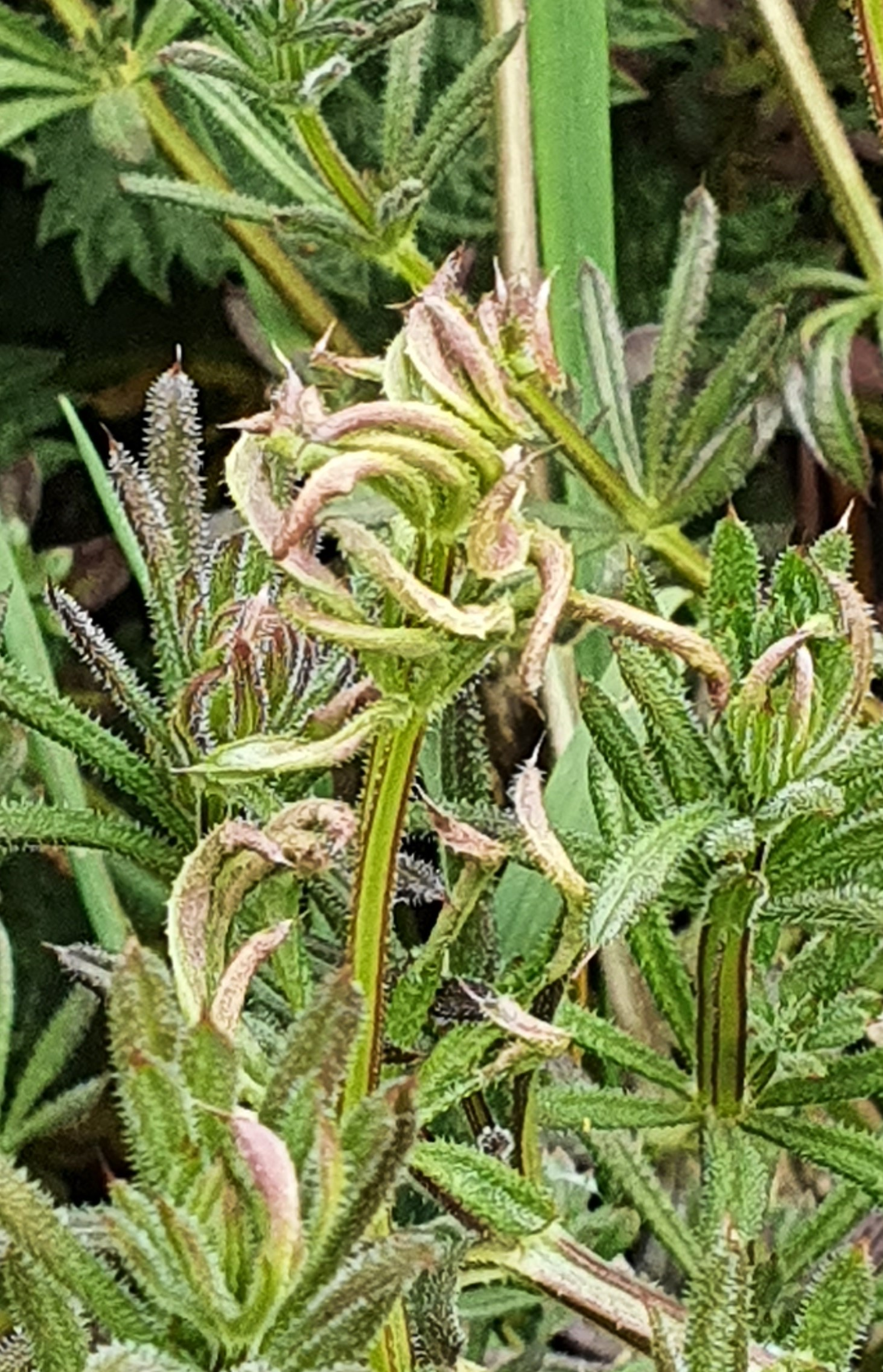
- Deformed leaves on Galium aparine caused by Cecidophyes rouhollahi

Scientific classification
- Domain: Eukaryota
- Kingdom: Animalia
- Phylum: Arthropoda
- Subphylum: Chelicerata
- Class: Arachnida
- Family: Eriophyidae
- Genus: Cecidophyes
- Species: C. rouhollahi

Binomial name
- Cecidophyes rouhollahi Craemer 1999

= Cecidophyes rouhollahi =

Species of mite

Cecidophyes rouhollahi is a species of mite in the genus Cecidophyes. It is a plant parasite, or gall, found on cleaver (Galium aparine) and can be a potential biological control agent for false cleavers (Galium spurium), which is a noxious weed in many places.
