= Aculus magnirostris =

Scientific classification
- Domain: Eukaryota
- Kingdom: Animalia
- Phylum: Arthropoda
- Subphylum: Chelicerata
- Class: Arachnida
- Family: Eriophyidae
- Genus: Aculus
- Species: A. magnirostris

Binomial name
- Aculus magnirostris (Nalepa, 1892)

Species of mite

Aculus magnirostris is a species of mite which causes galls on the leaves of willows (Salix species). It was first described by Alfred Nalepa in 1892.

== Description ==
According to Redfern et al. (2011), the gall of A. magnirostris is similar to the gall of A. craspedobius and the mites need to be examined for firm identification. The gall of A. magnirostris is a long, 1–2 mm narrow twisted, downward roll on the leaves of eared willow (S. alba), crack willow (S. fragilis) and their hybrids in Great Britain. The gall is lined with red hairs and contains the mites. Elsewhere it has been found on Babylon willow (S. babylonica) and purple willow (S. pururea).

In comparison, the galls of A. craspedobius differ by a shorter downward roll on the leaf edge. On the website Plant Parasites of Europe, photographs of A. magnirostris are similar to the description for A. craspedobius, but also shown is a longer downward roll in one photograph.

== Distribution ==
Aculus magnirostris has been found in Great Britain, Hungary and the Netherlands.
