= Aculus gemmarum =

Scientific classification
- Domain: Eukaryota
- Kingdom: Animalia
- Phylum: Arthropoda
- Subphylum: Chelicerata
- Class: Arachnida
- Family: Eriophyidae
- Genus: Aculus
- Species: A. gemmarum

Binomial name
- Aculus gemmarum (Nalepa, 1892)

Synonyms
- Eriophyes gemmarum Aceria gemmarum

Species of mite

Aculus gemmarum is a species of mite which causes galls on the buds of willows (Salix species). It was first described by Alfred Nalepa in 1892.

== Description ==
The buds are enlarged and hairy, and the mites are found between the small distorted leaves on Salix aegyptiac, S. aurita, S. babylonica, S. caprea, S. cinerea, S. elaeagnos, S. matsudana, S. repens (and possibly on Salix herbacea and Salix triandra).

== Distribution ==
Aculus gemmarum has been found in Finland, France, Germany, Great Britain, Italy and Sweden.
