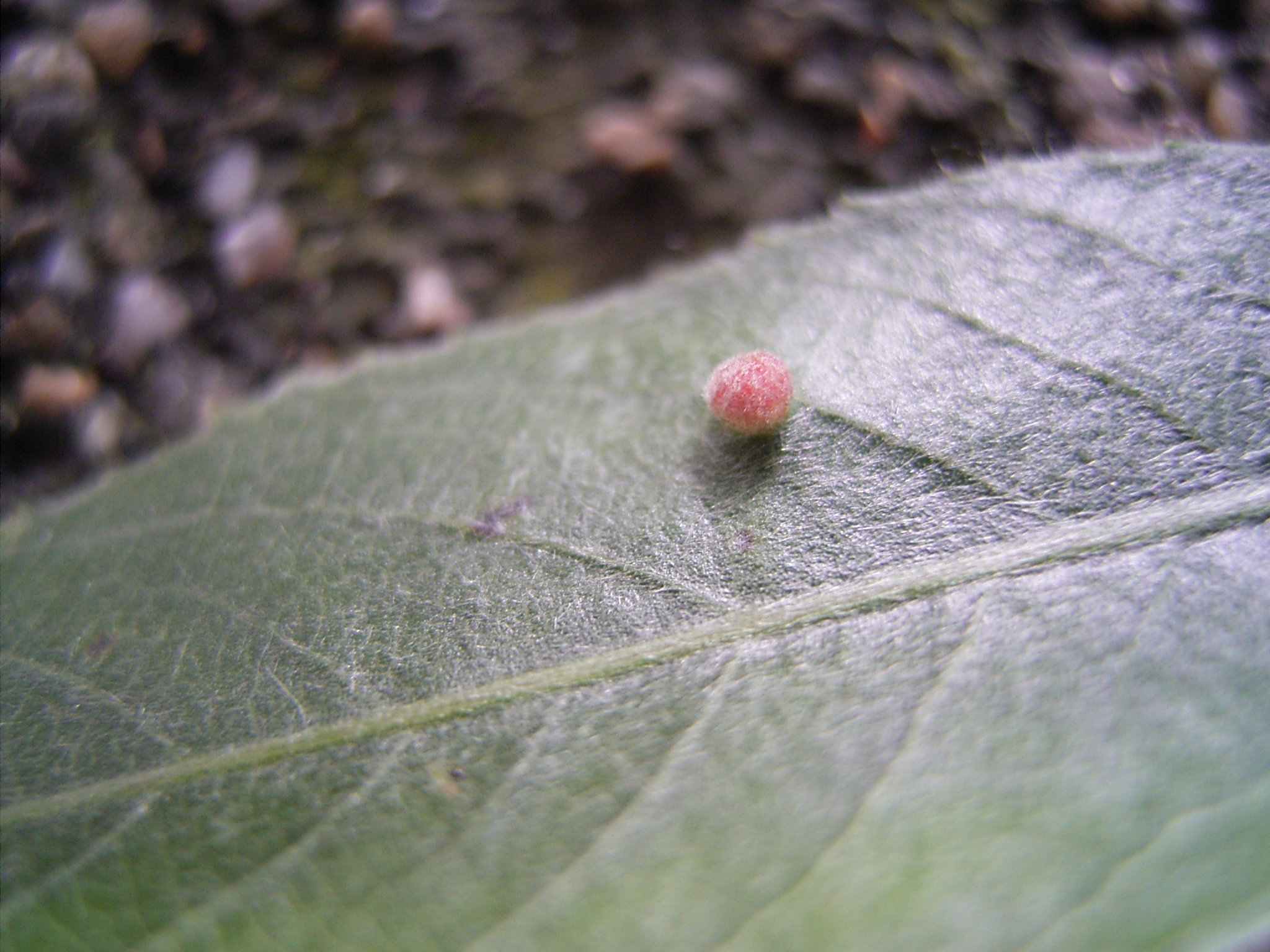
- Leaf gall on Salix alba caused by Aculus tetanothrix

Scientific classification
- Domain: Eukaryota
- Kingdom: Animalia
- Phylum: Arthropoda
- Subphylum: Chelicerata
- Class: Arachnida
- Family: Eriophyidae
- Genus: Aculus; Keifer, 1959

Type species
- Aculus ligustri (Keifer, 1938)

= Aculus =

Genus of mites

Aculus is a genus of mites, including the following species:

== Species ==
- Aculus ablopurpurascus Huang, 2001
- Aculus acanthae (Mohanasundaram, 1982)
- Aculus acraspis (Nalepa, 1892)
- Aculus acutangulae Mohanasundaram, 1985
- Aculus advens (Keifer, 1938)
- Aculus aegerinus (Nalepa, 1892)
- Aculus aesculi Domes, 2003
- Aculus aflatunivagrans (Ponomareva, 1978)
- Aculus africanae (Meyer & Ueckermann, 1990)
- Aculus albopurpurascus Huang, 2001
- Aculus alfalfae (Roivainen, 1950)
- Aculus altus (Nalepa, 1909)
- Aculus amandae (Keifer, 1969)
- Aculus ambrosiae (Keifer, 1943)
- Aculus amygdalina (Banks, 1912)
- Aculus anthobius (Nalepa, 1892)
- Aculus aphanotrichus (Liro, 1943)
- Aculus aphelus Smith-Meyer & Ueckermann, 1990
- Aculus arbosti (Cotte, 1924)
- Aculus arceosae (Briones & McDaniel, 1976)
- Aculus argenteae (Farkas, 1963)
- Aculus arzakanensis (Bagdasarian, 1970)
- Aculus asclepiellus Keifer, 1965
- Aculus asperi (Chandrapatya & Boczek, 2002)
- Aculus asperus Channabasavanna, 1966
- Aculus asteri (Petanovic & Boczek, 2000)
- Aculus atlantazaleae (Keifer, 1940)
- Aculus atturensis Mohanasundaram, 1980
- Aculus aucupariae (Liro, 1943)
- Aculus baccaureae (Farkas, 1960)
- Aculus bacsetae Flechtmann & Davis, 1971
- Aculus balevskii Natcheff, 1966
- Aculus ballei (Nalepa, 1891)
- Aculus bambusae Kuang, 1991
- Aculus bangalorensis Mohanasundaram, 1985
- Aculus beeveri (Manson & Gerson, 1986)
- Aculus betuli (Nalepa, 1897)
- Aculus blagayanae Jocic, Petanovic & Vidovic, 2011
- Aculus brevisetus Carmona, 1972
- Aculus broussaisiae Keifer, 1964
- Aculus broussenetiae Lin-Fuping, Jin-Changle & Kuang-Haiyua, 1997
- Aculus bursifex (Nalepa, 1921)
- Aculus calcarifer (Liro, 1943)
- Aculus calystegiae (Lamb, 1952)
- Aculus campbelli Knihinicki & Boczek, 2003
- Aculus capellae Keifer, 1979
- Aculus capsibaccati (Keifer, 1979)
- Aculus carsonellus (Keifer, 1966)
- Aculus caryfoliae Keifer, 1961
- Aculus cassiae Mondal & Chakrabarti, 1981
- Aculus catappae Boczek & Davis, 1984
- Aculus cauliflorus Boczek & Davis, 1984
- Aculus cayratiae Kuang-Haiyua, 1987
- Aculus cercidii (Keifer, 1965)
- Aculus cercidis (Hall, 1967)
- Aculus chaitus Keifer, 1965
- Aculus chamaespartii Carmona, 1974
- Aculus charniae Smith-Meyer & Ueckermann, 1990
- Aculus chihuahuae (Keifer, 1979)
- Aculus clerodendri Smith-Meyer & Ueckermann, 1990
- Aculus cneorum (Smith-Meyer & Ueckermann, 1990)
- Aculus colei Channabasavanna, 1966
- Aculus comatus (Nalepa, 1892)
- Aculus conspicillatus Flechtmann in Flechtmann & Moraes, 2003
- Aculus convolvuli (Nalepa, 1891)
- Aculus coronillae (Canestrini & Massalongo, 1893)
- Aculus corynocarpi (Manson, 1984)
- Aculus cotyledonis (Keifer, 1939)
- Aculus craspedobius (Nalepa, 1925)
- Aculus crataegumplicans (Cotte, 1910)
- Aculus cribatus (Keifer, 1961)
- Aculus cysticola (Canestrini, 1892)
- Aculus cytisi Labanowski in Soika & Labanowski, 2000
- Aculus daibuensis Huang, 2001
- Aculus daneki Shi & Boczek, 2000
- Aculus daphnes (Roivainen, 1951)
- Aculus didymbotryae Abou-Awad & El-Banhawy, 1992
- Aculus dimidiatus (Hall, 1967)
- Aculus dipterocarpi Boczek, 1993
- Aculus dominguensis (Cromroy, 1958)
- Aculus epilobiorum (Liro, 1940)
- Aculus epiphyllus (Nalepa, 1892)
- Aculus eurynotus (Nalepa, 1894)
- Aculus excoecaria (Mondal & Chakrabarti, 1982)
- Aculus fabus Boczek & Knihinicki, 1998
- Aculus fascigrans Boczek & Shi in Boczek, Shi & Lewandowski, 2002
- Aculus ficivagrans Mohanasundaram, 1985
- Aculus flacourtiae Mohanasundaram, 1984
- Aculus fockeui (Nalepa & Trouessart, 1891)
- Aculus fraxini (Nalepa, 1894)
- Aculus gemmarum (Nalepa, 1892)
- Aculus glacialis (Thomas, 1885)
- Aculus glechomae (Liro, 1940)
- Aculus groenlandicus (Rostrup, 1900)
- Aculus gutierrezi (Keifer, 1973)
- Aculus haloragi (Lamb, 1953)
- Aculus hapsis Smith-Meyer & Ueckermann, 1990
- Aculus harpazi Smith-Meyer & Ueckermann, 1990
- Aculus heatherae (Manson, 1984)
- Aculus hedysari (Liro, 1941)
- Aculus helianthemi (Roivainen, 1950)
- Aculus helichrysi (Meyer & Ueckermann, 1990)
- Aculus hippocastani (Fockeu, 1890)
- Aculus huangzhongensis Kuang, 2000
- Aculus hygrophilus (Roivainen, 1953)
- Aculus hyperici (Liro, 1943)
- Aculus ichnocarpi (Ghosh & Chakrabarati, 1989)
- Aculus indicus Channabasavanna, 1966
- Aculus inquilinus Berezantsev, 1989
- Aculus jahandiezi (Cotte, 1924)
- Aculus jilinensis (Kuang, 1995)
- Aculus juglandis Natcheff, 1966
- Aculus khayae Smith-Meyer & Ueckermann, 1990
- Aculus kochi (Nalepa & Thomas, 1894)
- Aculus kolengii Mohanasundaram, 1981
- Aculus konoellus Keifer, 1965
- Aculus kumari (Mohanasundaram, 1982)
- Aculus lactucae (Canestrini, 1893)
- Aculus laevigatae (Hassan, 1928)
- Aculus laevis (Nalepa, 1892)
- Aculus lambi (Manson, 1965)
- Aculus latilobus (Keifer, 1955)
- Aculus latus (Nalepa, 1894)
- Aculus leguminae (Mohanasundaram, 1982)
- Aculus leionotus (Nalepa, 1891)
- Aculus leonotis Smith-Meyer & Ueckermann, 1990
- Aculus lepidii (Roivainen, 1953)
- Aculus leptadeniae Mohanasundaram, 1985
- Aculus ligustri (Keifer, 1938)
- Aculus liquidambaris (Keifer, 1940)
- Aculus longanensis Wei & Kuang, 1997
- Aculus longifilis (Canestrini, 1891)
- Aculus longinychus (Smith-Meyer & Ueckermann, 1990)
- Aculus longiseta Carmona, 1972
- Aculus magnirostris (Nalepa, 1892)
- Aculus malus (Zaher & Abou, Awad, 1979)
- Aculus malvae Boczek & Davis, 1984
- Aculus mansoni Amrine & Stasny, 1994
- Aculus marinkovici Petanovic, 1987
- Aculus martialis (Liro, 1941)
- Aculus masseei (Nalepa, 1925)
- Aculus mastigophorus (Nalepa, 1890)
- Aculus maximilianae (Briones & McDaniel, 1976)
- Aculus megacrinis Keifer, 1962
- Aculus meghriensis (Bagdasarian, 1970)
- Aculus meliae Kuang & Zhuo, 1989
- Aculus melicoccae (Boczek & Oleczek, 1988)
- Aculus menoni Channabasavanna, 1966
- Aculus merostichus (Nalepa, 1918)
- Aculus mespili (Bagdasarian, 1981)
- Aculus micheneri (Hall, 1967)
- Aculus microspinatus (Hall, 1967)
- Aculus minor (Nalepa, 1892)
- Aculus minutissimus (Hodgkiss, 1913)
- Aculus minutus (Nalepa, 1890)
- Aculus mogeri (Farkas, 1960)
- Aculus montanae Mohanasundaram, 1985
- Aculus moringae Channabasavanna, 1966
- Aculus morivagrans Boczek, 1968
- Aculus mumis (Kuang & Gong, 1996)
- Aculus myrsinites (Roivainen, 1947)
- Aculus nigrus Keifer, 1959
- Aculus niphlocladae (Keifer, 1966)
- Aculus ocimumae Mohanasundaram, 1991
- Aculus olearius Castagnoli, 1977
- Aculus oresterae (Keifer, 1978)
- Aculus ornatus (Roivainen, 1947)
- Aculus osteospermi Smith-Meyer & Ueckermann, 1990
- Aculus parafockeui Liu & Kuang, 1998
- Aculus parakarensis (Bagdasarian, 1972)
- Aculus parapycnanthemi Keifer, 1964
- Aculus parvensis (Manson, 1972)
- Aculus parvifoli (Smith-Meyer & Ueckermann, 1990)
- Aculus parvus (Nalepa, 1892)
- Aculus pavoniae Smith-Meyer & Ueckermann, 1990
- Aculus phaneris Amrine, 2002
- Aculus phyllocopteoides (Nalepa, 1891)
- Aculus physodesi (Keifer, 1979)
- Aculus pimpinellae (Liro, 1941)
- Aculus pistaciae Kuang-Haiyuan, 1998
- Aculus pitangae Boczek & Davis, 1984
- Aculus pittosporae (Mohanasundaram, 1982)
- Aculus pittosporacus Amrine & Stasny, 1994
- Aculus pittosporae (Mohanasundaram, 1982)
- Aculus podanthi (Nalepa, 1929)
- Aculus pretoriensis (Meyer & Ueckermann, 1990)
- Aculus pritchardi (Keifer, 1953)
- Aculus prunelli (Liro, 1942)
- Aculus pteleaevagrans Boczek, 1964
- Aculus pterygospermae Mohanasundaram, 1985
- Aculus pulaviensis Boczek, 1968
- Aculus pycnorhynchus (Nalepa, 1925)
- Aculus quinquilobus (Hodgkiss, 1913)
- Aculus reticulatus (Nalepa, 1890)
- Aculus retiolatus (Nalepa, 1892)
- Aculus rhamnivagrans (Keifer, 1939)
- Aculus rhododendronis (Keifer, 1940)
- Aculus rhopodacrus Smith-Meyer & Ueckermann, 1990
- Aculus ribis (Massee, 1929)
- Aculus rigidus (Nalepa, 1894)
- Aculus rubiae (Roivainen, 1953)
- Aculus rugosus (Sapozhnikova, 1980)
- Aculus salicis Kuang & Luo, 1997
- Aculus salicisalbae (Nalepa, 1925)
- Aculus salicisarbusculae (Nalepa, 1925)
- Aculus salicisforbyanae (Nalepa, 1925)
- Aculus salicisfragilis (Nalepa, 1925)
- Aculus salicisgrandifoliae (Nalepa, 1925)
- Aculus salicisincanae (Nalepa, 1925)
- Aculus salicisretusae (Nalepa, 1925)
- Aculus sarcococcae Mohanasundaram, 1985
- Aculus sargentodoxae Wei & Kuang, 1997
- Aculus sarothamni Boczek, 1961
- Aculus sayanicus Skoracka in Skoracka & Pacyna, 2003
- Aculus schlechtendali (Nalepa, 1890)
- Aculus schmardae (Nalepa, 1889)
- Aculus schubarti (Farkas, 1960)
- Aculus scutellariae (Canestrini & Massalongo, 1895)
- Aculus semenovi (Shevtchenko, Marikovski & Shamsutdinova, 1973)
- Aculus shanghaiensis Kuang, 1997
- Aculus shaoxingensis Kuang-Haiyuan, 1998
- Aculus shoreum (Ghosh, Mondal & Chakrabarti, 1986)
- Aculus smilacis Keifer, 1962
- Aculus solani Boczek & Davis, 1984
- Aculus stachysi (Petanovic & Boczek, 1991)
- Aculus staphyleae (Pantanelli, 1912)
- Aculus stigmatus (Nalepa, 1914)
- Aculus succiphagus (Meyer & Ueckermann, 1990)
- Aculus symphoricarpi (Keifer, 1939)
- Aculus syriacus (Fockeu, 1892)
- Aculus tamalpais (Keifer, 1939)
- Aculus tetanothrix (Nalepa, 1889)
- Aculus tetracanthus Smith-Meyer & Ueckermann, 1990
- Aculus tetraspermae (Chandrapatya, 1992)
- Aculus teucrii (Nalepa, 1892)
- Aculus thomasi (Nalepa, 1895)
- Aculus tibialis (Liro, 1943)
- Aculus tiliaevagrans Boczek, 1964
- Aculus tomentosi (Meyer & Ueckermann, 1990)
- Aculus triflorae (Di Stefano, 1966)
- Aculus trifolii Natcheff, 1979
- Aculus truncatus (Nalepa, 1892)
- Aculus ulae Boczek, 1961
- Aculus unctus Boczek, 1964
- Aculus undatae Smith-Meyer & Ueckermann, 1990
- Aculus vallis Keifer, 1966
- Aculus variabilis (Roivainen, 1953)
- Aculus verbenae (Keifer, 1977)
- Aculus vermicularis (Nalepa, 1914)
- Aculus verrucosus Flechtmann, 1996
- Aculus viburni Petanovic, Boczek & Shi, 2002
- Aculus viburnifoliae (Boczek & Shi, 1995)
- Aculus vitecicola (Kikuti, 1939)
- Aculus wagnoni (Keifer, 1959)
- Aculus wisterifoliae Keifer, 1963
- Aculus xylostei (Canestrini, 1891)
- Aculus yelagiriensis Mohanasundaram, 1980
- Aculus zaheri (Abou-Awad, 1979)
- Aculus zygophylli Smith-Meyer & Ueckermann, 1990
