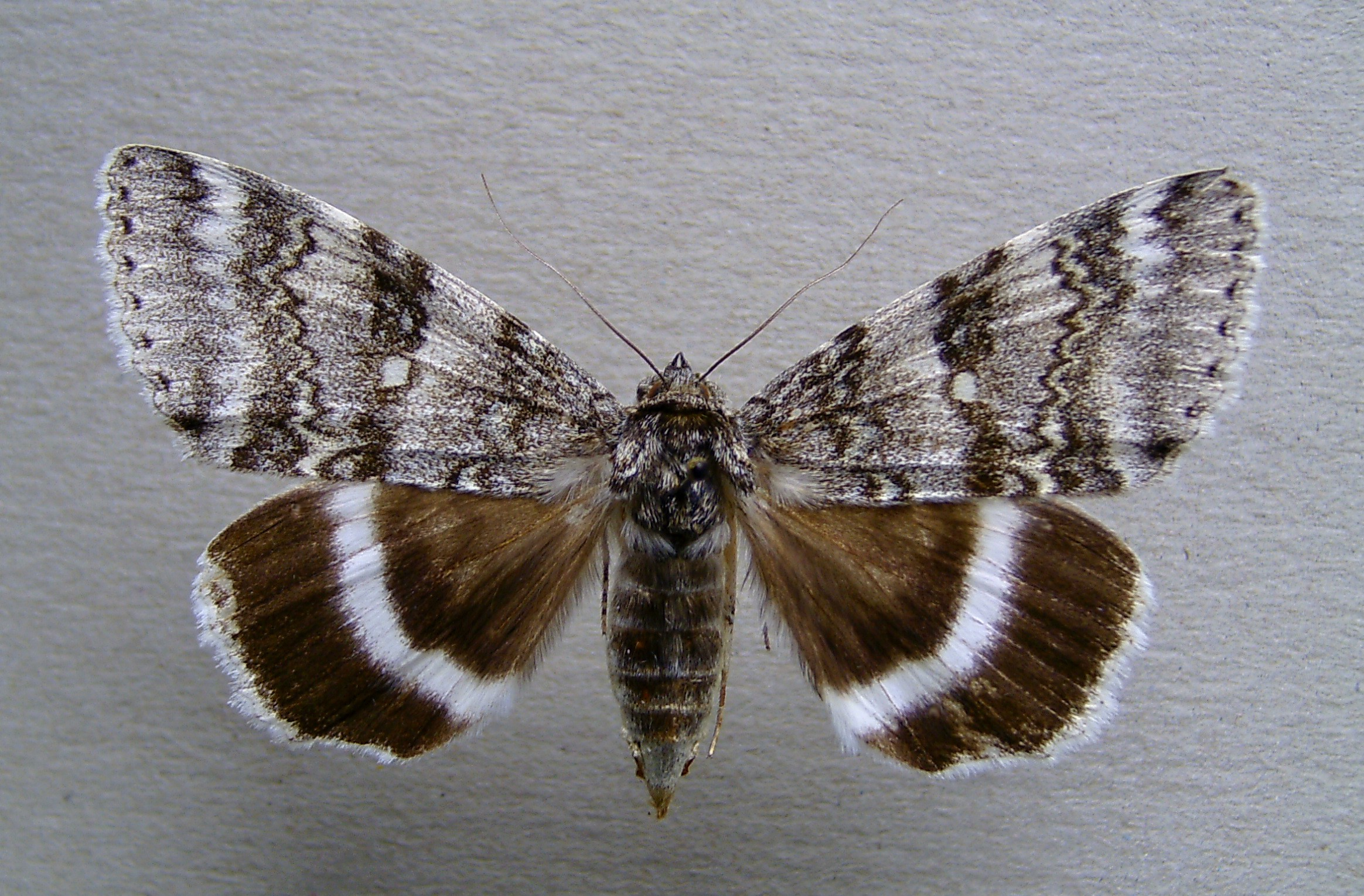
- Lectotype of Catocala relicta elda, now considered to be a synonym of Catocala relicta

Scientific classification
- Kingdom: Animalia
- Phylum: Arthropoda
- Class: Insecta
- Order: Lepidoptera
- Superfamily: Noctuoidea
- Family: Erebidae
- Genus: Catocala
- Species: C. relicta

Binomial name
- Catocala relicta Walker, 1858

Synonyms
- Catocala bianca H. Edwards, 1880; Catocala phrynia H. Edwards, 1880; Catocala clara Beutenmüller, 1903; Catocala fischeri Meyer, 1958; Catocala elda Behrens, 1887

= Catocala relicta =

Species of moth

Catocala relicta, the white underwing or relict, is a moth of the family Erebidae. The species was first described by Francis Walker in 1858. It lives in southern Canada, from Newfoundland to Vancouver Island, south to Missouri, and Arizona.

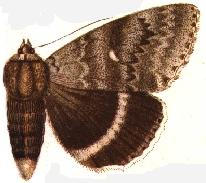
Catocala relicta elda

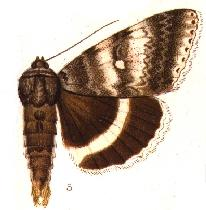
Catocala relicta relicta

The wingspan is 67–75 mm. Adults are on wing from July to September in one generation depending on the location.

The larvae feed on Betula papyrifera, Carya ovata, Populus alba, Populus balsamifera, Populus deltoides, Populus nigra, Populus tremuloides, Quercus species, and Salix species (including Salix eriocephala).

== Subspecies ==
Catocala relicta elda, recorded from Oregon, was formerly considered a subspecies, but is now thought to be a synonym of Catocala relicta.
