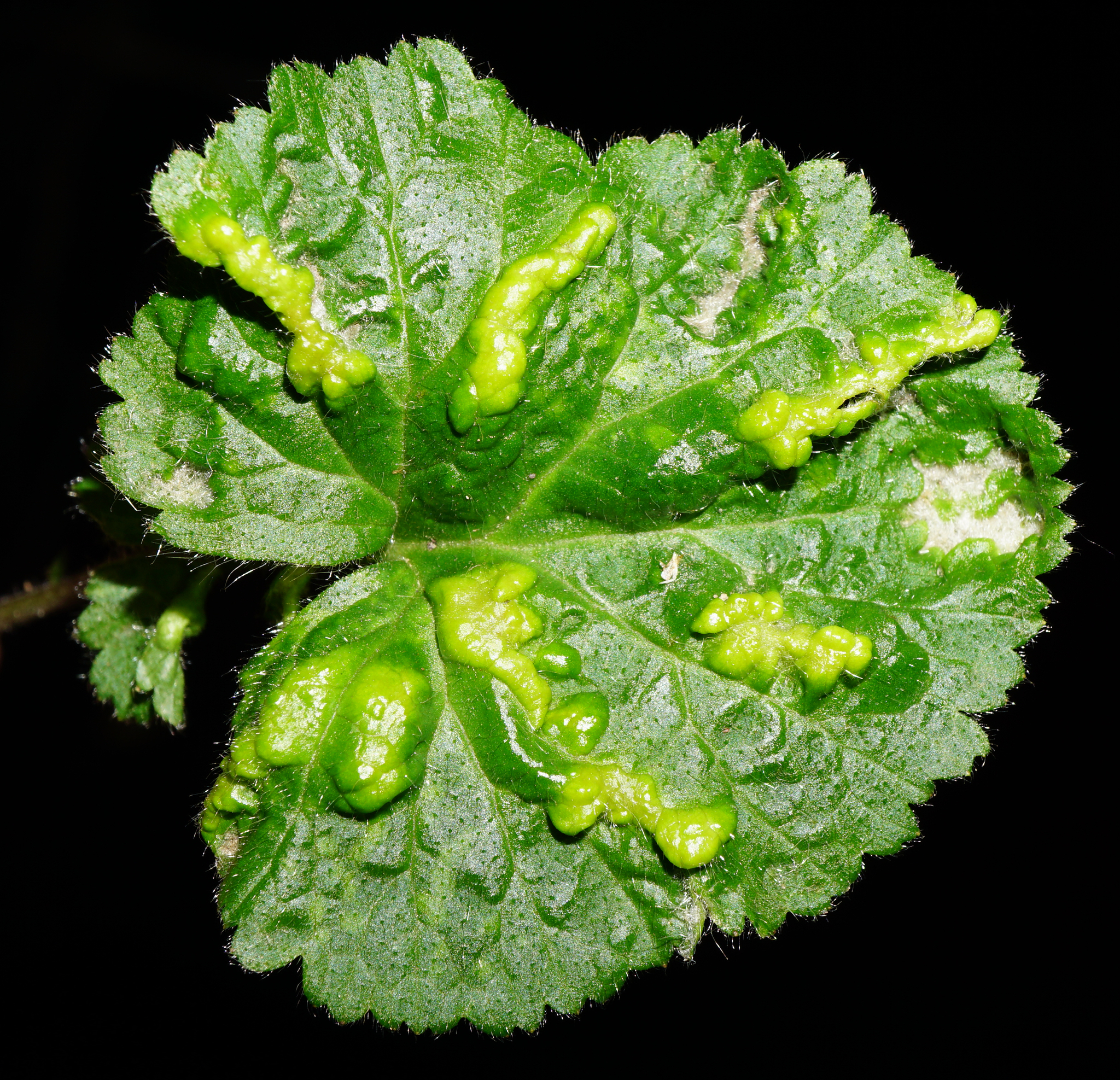
- Galls from Cecidophyes nudus larvae feeding on leaf of Geum urbanum

Scientific classification
- Domain: Eukaryota
- Kingdom: Animalia
- Phylum: Arthropoda
- Subphylum: Chelicerata
- Class: Arachnida
- Family: Eriophyidae
- Genus: Cecidophyes; Nalepa 1887

Species
- See text

= Cecidophyes =

Genus of mites

Cecidophyes is a genus of mites in the family Eriophyidae. It is a plant parasite, causing galls or other damage to the plant tissues.

== Species ==
- Cecidophyes borealis
- Cecidophyes caliquerci
- Cecidophyes calvus
- Cecidophyes campestris
- Cecidophyes cerriquerci
- Cecidophyes galii
- Cecidophyes geranii
- Cecidophyes gibsoni
- Cecidophyes glaber
- Cecidophyes gymnaspis
- Cecidophyes lauri
- Cecidophyes malifoliae
- Cecidophyes monspessulani
- Cecidophyes nudus
- Cecidophyes potentillae
- Cecidophyes psilocranus
- Cecidophyes psilonotus
- Cecidophyes quercialbae
- Cecidophyes querciphagus
- Cecidophyes reticulatus
- Cecidophyes rouhollahi, found on Galium aparine
- Cecidophyes rumicis
- Cecidophyes tristernalis
- Cecidophyes violae
