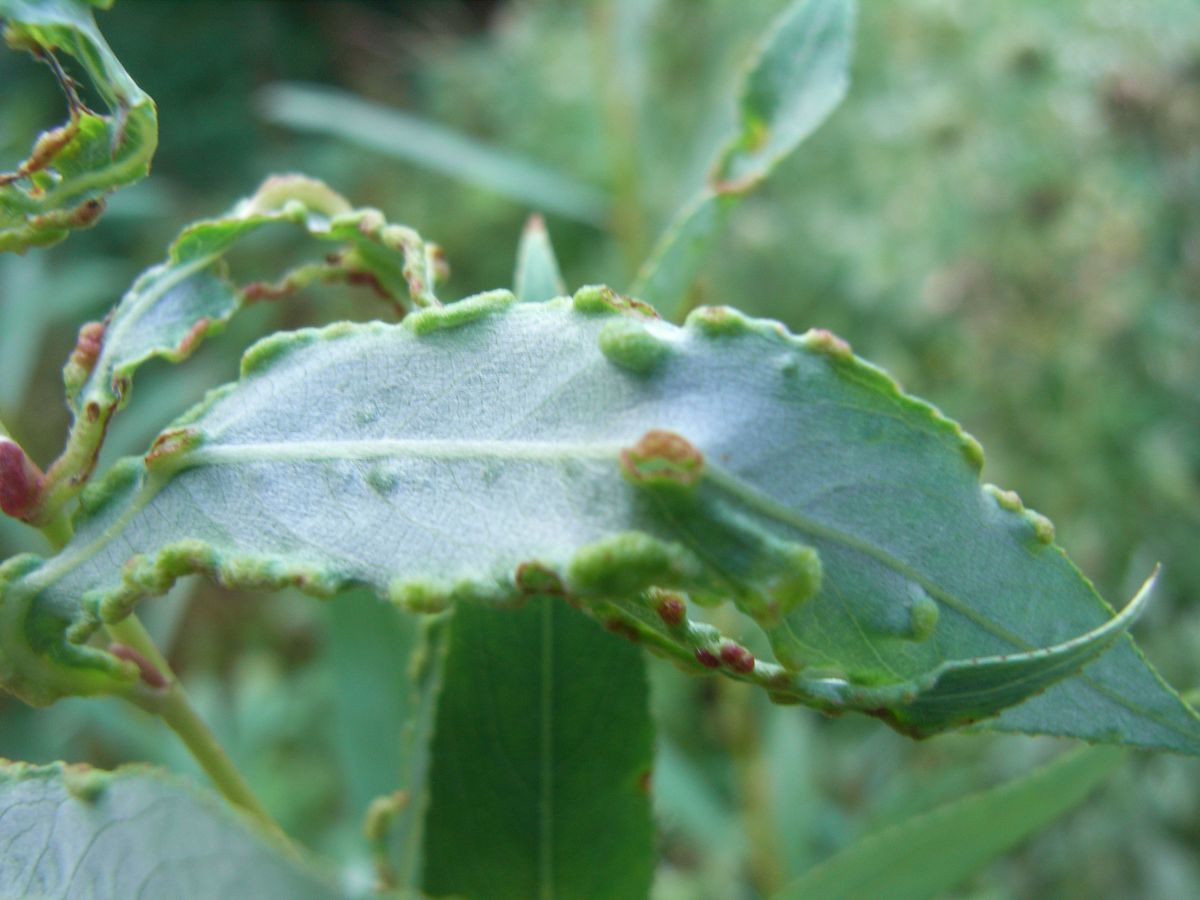
- Leaf galls caused by Aculus craspedobius

Scientific classification
- Domain: Eukaryota
- Kingdom: Animalia
- Phylum: Arthropoda
- Subphylum: Chelicerata
- Class: Arachnida
- Family: Eriophyidae
- Genus: Aculus
- Species: A. craspedobius

Binomial name
- Aculus craspedobius (Nalepa, 1925)

Synonyms
- Vasates craspedobius

= Aculus craspedobius =

Species of mite

Aculus craspedobius is a species of mite which causes galls on the leaves of willows (Salix species). It was first described by Alfred Nalepa in 1925.

== Description ==
According to Redfern et al. (2011), the gall of A. craspedobius is similar to the gall of A. magnirostris and the mites need to be examined for firm identification. The gall of craspedobius is a short, 1–2 mm narrow twisted, downward roll on the leaves of eared willow (S. alba), crack willow (S. fragilis) and their hybrids in Great Britain. The gall is lined with red hairs and contains the mites. Elsewhere it has been found on goat willow (S. caprea) and purple willow (S. pururea).

In comparison, the galls of A. magnirostris differ by a longer downward roll on the leaf edge. On the website Plant Parasites of Europe, photographs of A. magnirostris are similar to the description for A. craspedobius.

== Distribution ==
Aculus craspedobius has been found in Austria, Germany, Great Britain and Poland.
