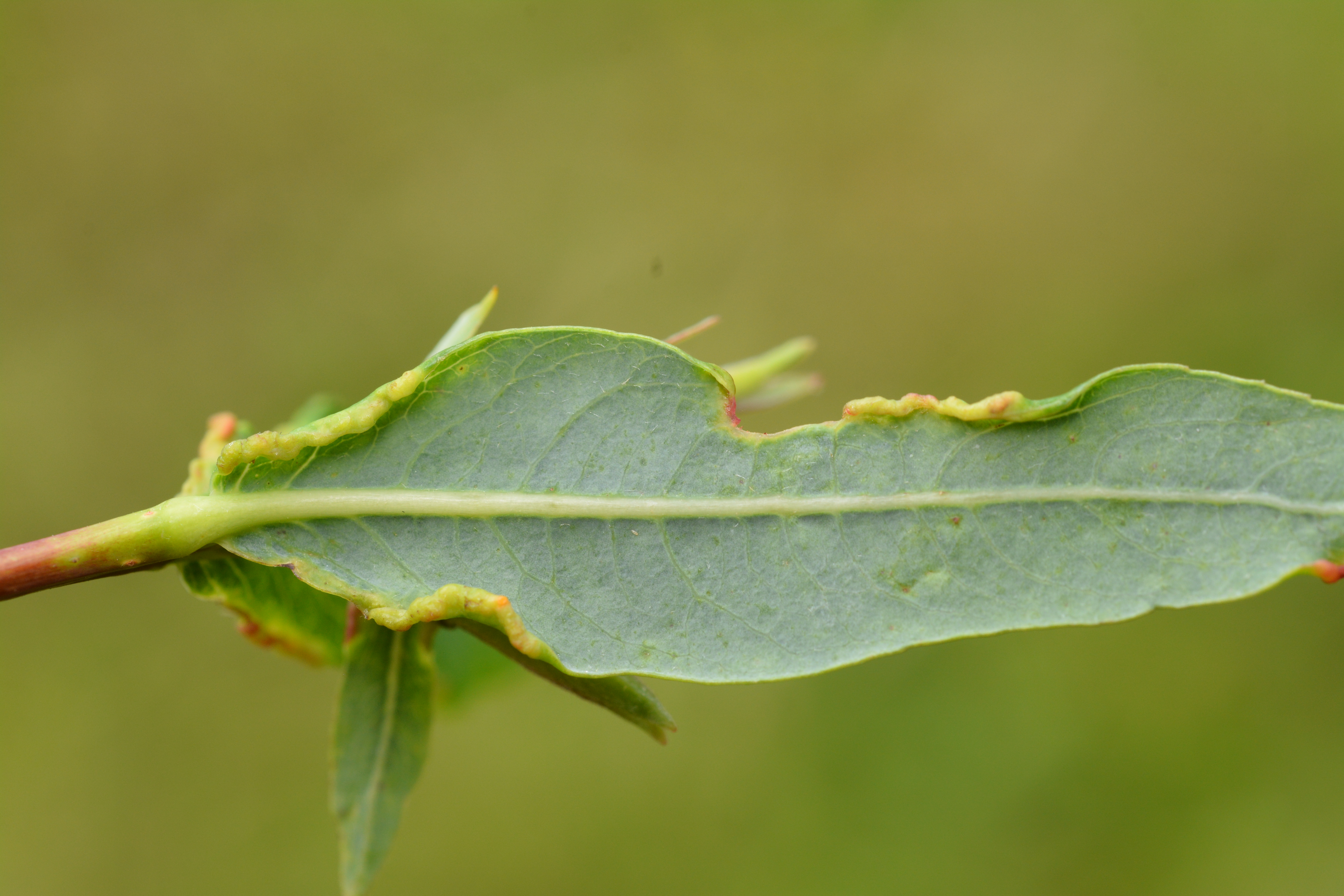
- Gall on purple willow

Scientific classification
- Domain: Eukaryota
- Kingdom: Animalia
- Phylum: Arthropoda
- Subphylum: Chelicerata
- Class: Arachnida
- Family: Eriophyidae
- Genus: Aculus
- Species: A. truncatus

Binomial name
- Aculus truncatus (Nalepa, 1892)

Synonyms
- Aceria truncata Vasates truncatus

= Aculus truncatus =

Species of mite

Aculus truncatus is a species of mite which causes galls on the leaves of purple willow (Salix purpurea). It was first described by Alfred Nalepa in 1892.

== Description ==
The gall is a short, 1–2 millimetres (0.039–0.079 in) narrow twisted, downward roll on the leaves of purple willow (S. purpurea). It is lined with red hairs and contains mites.

Similar looking galls have also been found on common osier (S. viminalis) and on sallows, which could also be A. truncatus. The mites should be identified by an expert.

A. truncatus has also been known to use Salix alba as a host.
