= Galium aparine =

Cleavers

Scientific classification
- Kingdom: Plantae
- Clade: Tracheophytes
- Clade: Angiosperms
- Clade: Eudicots
- Clade: Asterids
- Order: Gentianales
- Family: Rubiaceae
- Genus: Galium
- Species: G. aparine

Binomial name
- Galium aparine L.

Synonyms
- Aparine hispida Moench nom. illeg.; Aparine vulgaris Hill; Asperula aparine (L.) Besser nom. illeg.; Asterophyllum aparine (L.) Schimp. & Spenn.; Crucianella purpurea Wulff ex Steud.; Galion aparinum (L.) St.-Lag.; Galium aculeatissimum Kit. ex Kanitz; Galium adhaerens Gilib. nom. inval.; Galium asperum Honck. nom. illeg.; Galium australe Reiche nom. illeg.; Galium charoides Rusby; Galium chilense Hook.f.; Galium chonosense Clos nom. illeg.; Galium hispidum Willd.; Galium horridum Eckl. & Zeyh. nom. illeg.; Galium intermedium Mérat nom. illeg.; Galium lappaceum Salisb. nom. illeg.; Galium larecajense Wernham; Galium parviflorum Maxim. nom. illeg.; Galium pseudoaparine Griseb.; Galium scaberrimum Vahl ex Hornem.; Galium segetum K.Koch; Galium tenerrimum Schur; Galium uliginosum Thunb. nom. illeg.; Galium uncinatum Gray; Rubia aparine (L.) Baill.

Species of flowering plant

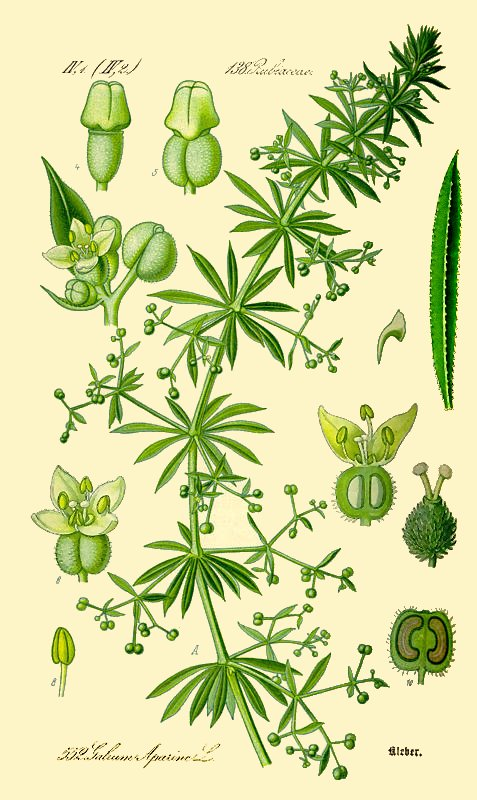
Illustration

Galium aparine, commonly called cleavers, and also known as bedstraw, catchweed, goose grass, sticky bob, sticky willy, and velcro plant, is an annual, herbaceous plant of the family Rubiaceae.

== Names ==
Galium aparine is known by a variety of common names in English. They include bedstraw, bobby buttons, catchweed, cleavers, clivers, (small) goosegrass, grip grass, hitchhikers, robin-run-the-hedge, stickeljack, stickyback, sticky bob, stickybud, sticky grass, stickyjack, sticky molly, stickyweed, sticky willow, sticky willy, sweetheart, velcro plant, and whippysticks.

Galium is Dioscorides's name for the plant. It is derived from the Greek word for milk, because the flowers of Galium verum were used to curdle milk in cheese making. Aparine is a name used by Theophrastus. It means 'clinging' or 'seizing', and is derived from the Greek απαίρω apairo 'lay hold of, seize', itself coming from από 'from' + αίρω 'pull to lift'.

== Description ==
Cleavers are annuals with creeping straggling stems that branch and grow along the ground and over other plants. They attach themselves by the small hooked hairs that grow on the stems and leaves. The stems can reach up to 1.2 metres (4 ft) tall, and are angular or square shaped. The leaves are simple, narrowly oblanceolate to linear, and borne in whorls of six to eight.

Cleavers have tiny, star-shaped, white to greenish flowers, which emerge from early spring to summer. The flowers are clustered in groups of two or three, and are borne out of the leaf axils. The corolla bears 4 petals. The globular fruits are burrs which grow one to three seeds clustered together; they are covered with hooked hairs which cling to animal fur and human clothing, aiding in seed dispersal.

=== Chemistry ===
Chemical constituents of Galium aparine include: iridoid glycosides such as asperulosidic acid and 10-deacetylasperulosidic acid; asperuloside; monotropein; aucubin; alkaloids such as caffeine; flavonoids; coumarins; organic acids such as citric acid and a red dye; phenolics such as phenolic acid; and anthraquinone derivatives such as the aldehyde nordamnacanthal (1,3-dihydroxy-anthraquinone-2-al).

== Distribution ==
The species is native to a wide region of Europe, North Africa, and Asia, from Britain and the Canary Islands to Japan. It is now naturalized throughout most of the United States, Canada, Mexico, Central America, South America, Australia, New Zealand, some oceanic islands, and scattered locations in Africa. Whether it is native to North America is a matter of some debate, but it is considered native there in most literature. It is considered a noxious weed in many places.

== Ecology ==
The plant can be found growing in hedges and waste places, limestone scree, and as a garden weed.

G. aparine prefers moist soils and can exist in areas with poor drainage. It reportedly flourishes in heavy soils with above-average nitrogen and phosphorus content, and prefers soils with a pH value between 5.5 and 8.0. G. aparine is often found in post-fire plant communities in the United States, likely developing from onsite seed and therefore rendering controlled burns an ineffective means of removing G. aparine in areas where it is considered a noxious weed.

Geese frequently consume the plant, hence the common names "goosegrass". Many insects feed on it, including aphids and spittlebugs.

The anthraquinone aldehyde nordamnacanthal (1,3-dihydroxy-anthraquinone-2-al) present in G. aparine has an antifeedant activity against Spodoptera litura, the Oriental leafworm moth, a species which is considered an agricultural pest. The mite Cecidophyes rouhollahi can be found on G. aparine.

== Toxicity ==
For some people, contact with the plant can cause skin irritation. Although the plant's hairs are small, they can scratch more sensitive parts of the skin. Numerous such scratches can resemble a rash.

== Uses ==
=== Culinary ===
Galium aparine is edible. The leaves and stems of the plant can be cooked as a leaf vegetable if gathered before the fruits harden. However, the numerous small hooks which cover the plant and give it its clinging nature can make it less palatable if eaten raw. Cleavers are in the same family as coffee. The fruits of cleavers have often been dried and roasted, and then used as a coffee substitute, which contains less caffeine.

=== Folk medicine ===
Poultices and washes made from cleavers were traditionally used to treat a variety of skin ailments, light wounds, and burns. As a pulp, it has been used to relieve venomous bites and stings. To make a poultice, the entire plant is used and applied directly to the affected area. Making a tea with the dried leaves is most common. It can be brewed hot or cold. For a cold infusion, steep in water and refrigerate for 24–48 hours.

=== Other uses ===
Dioscorides reported that ancient Greek shepherds would use the barbed stems of cleavers to make a "rough sieve", which could be used to strain milk. Carl Linnaeus later reported the same usage in Sweden, a tradition that is still practised today.

In Europe, the plant's dried, matted foliage was once used to stuff mattresses. Several of the bedstraws were used for this purpose because the clinging hairs cause the branches to stick together, which enables the mattress filling to maintain a uniform thickness. The roots of cleavers can be used to make a permanent red dye.

Children in Britain and Ireland have historically used cleavers as a form of entertainment. The tendency of leaves and stems to adhere to clothing is used in various forms of play, such as mock camouflage and pranks.

== Photos ==
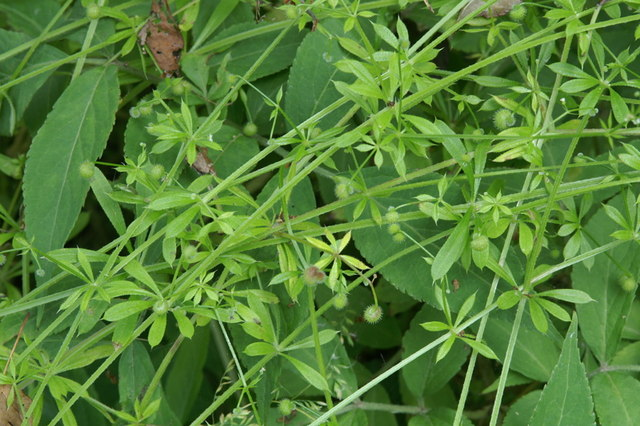
Cleavers, creeping together over the tops of other plants on the forest floor.

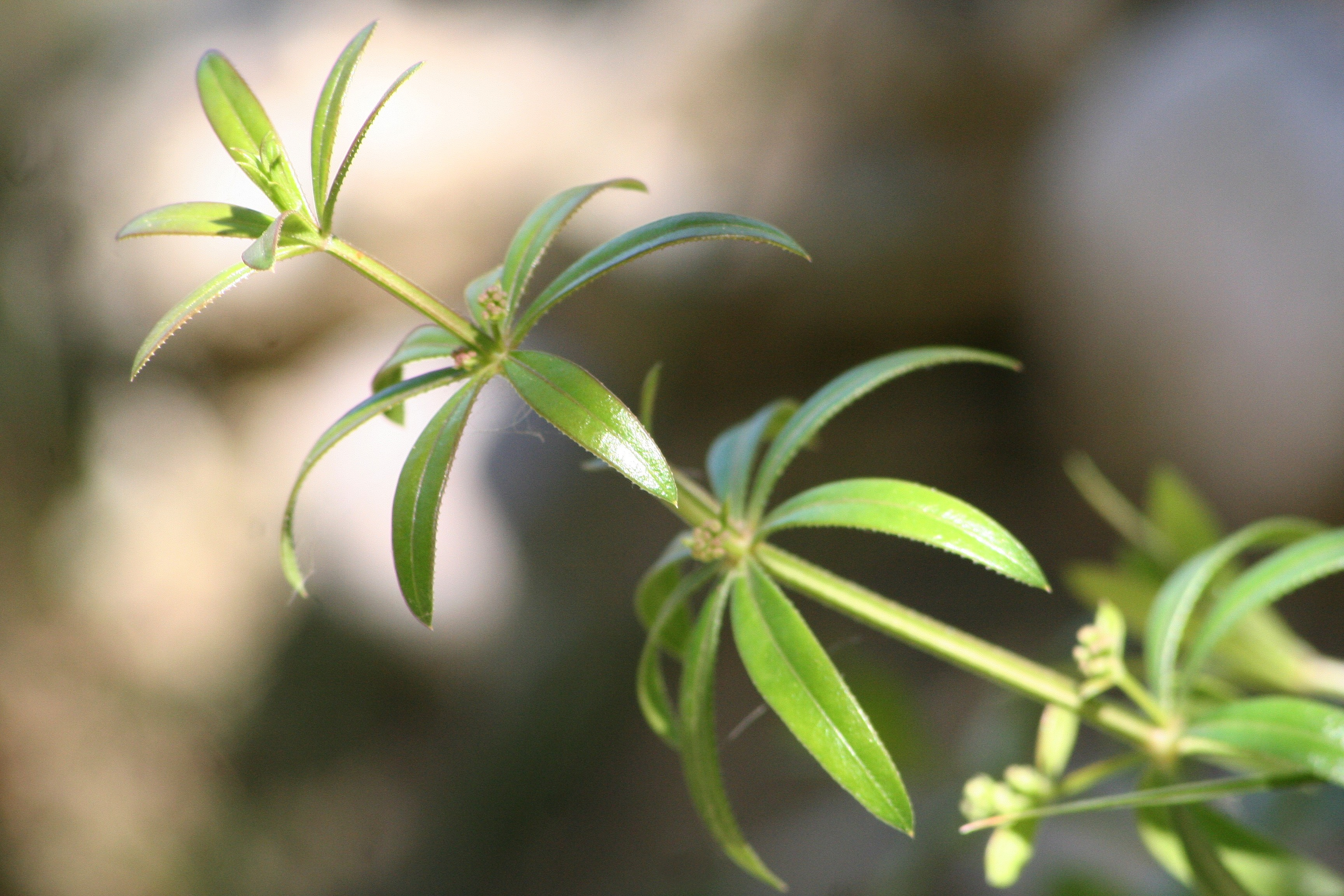
Leaves and stem of G. aparine. Notice the angular stem and whorled oblong/lanceolate leaves.

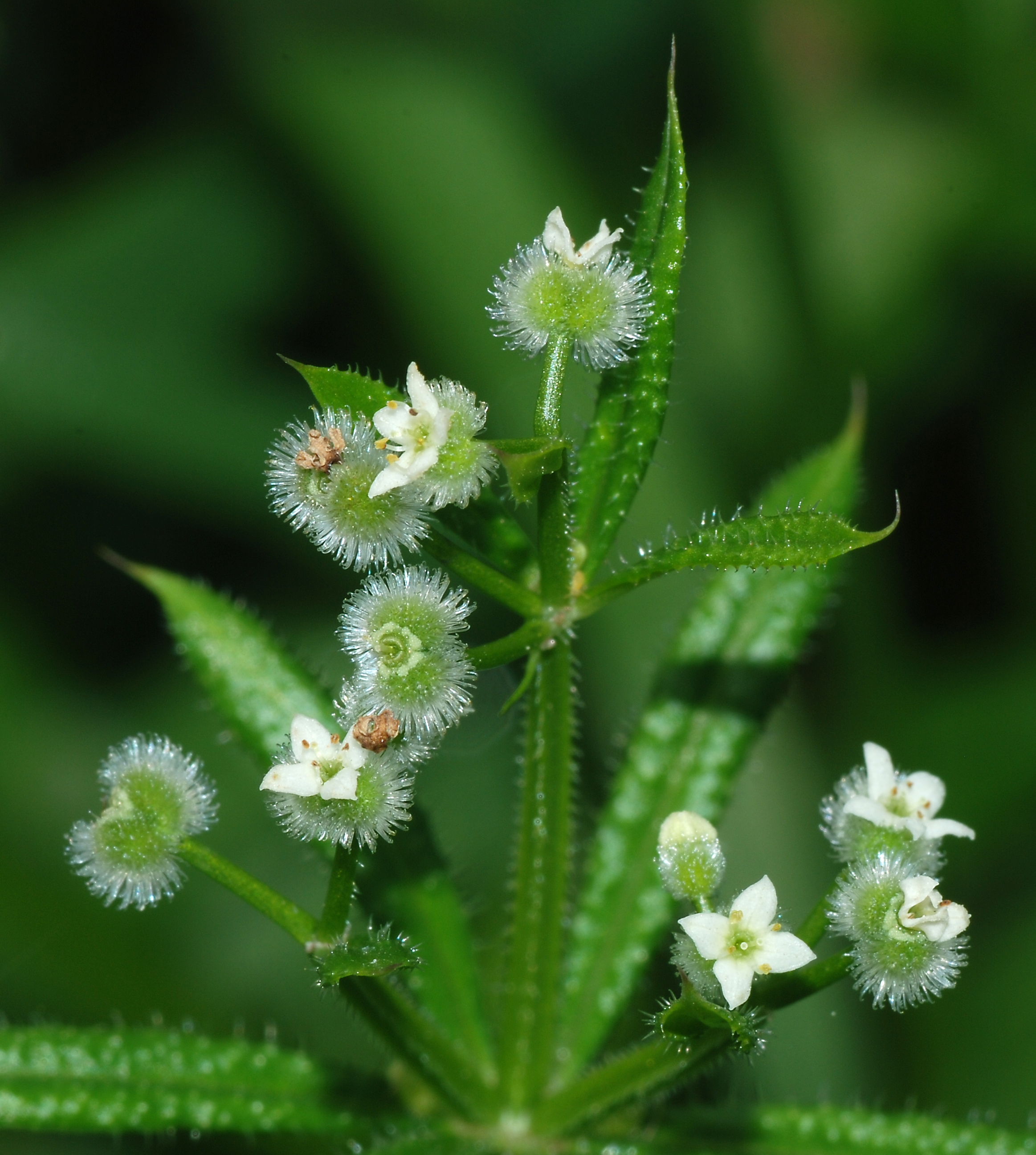
Flower and fruit of G. aparine. The fruit is an adhesive burr that clings to passing animals to spread the seeds.

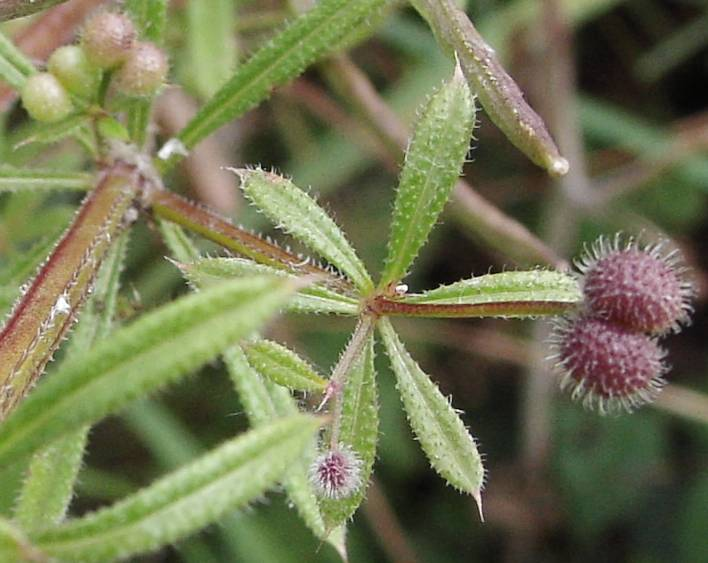
Galium aparine, closeup with leaves and fruit, from Cologne, Germany

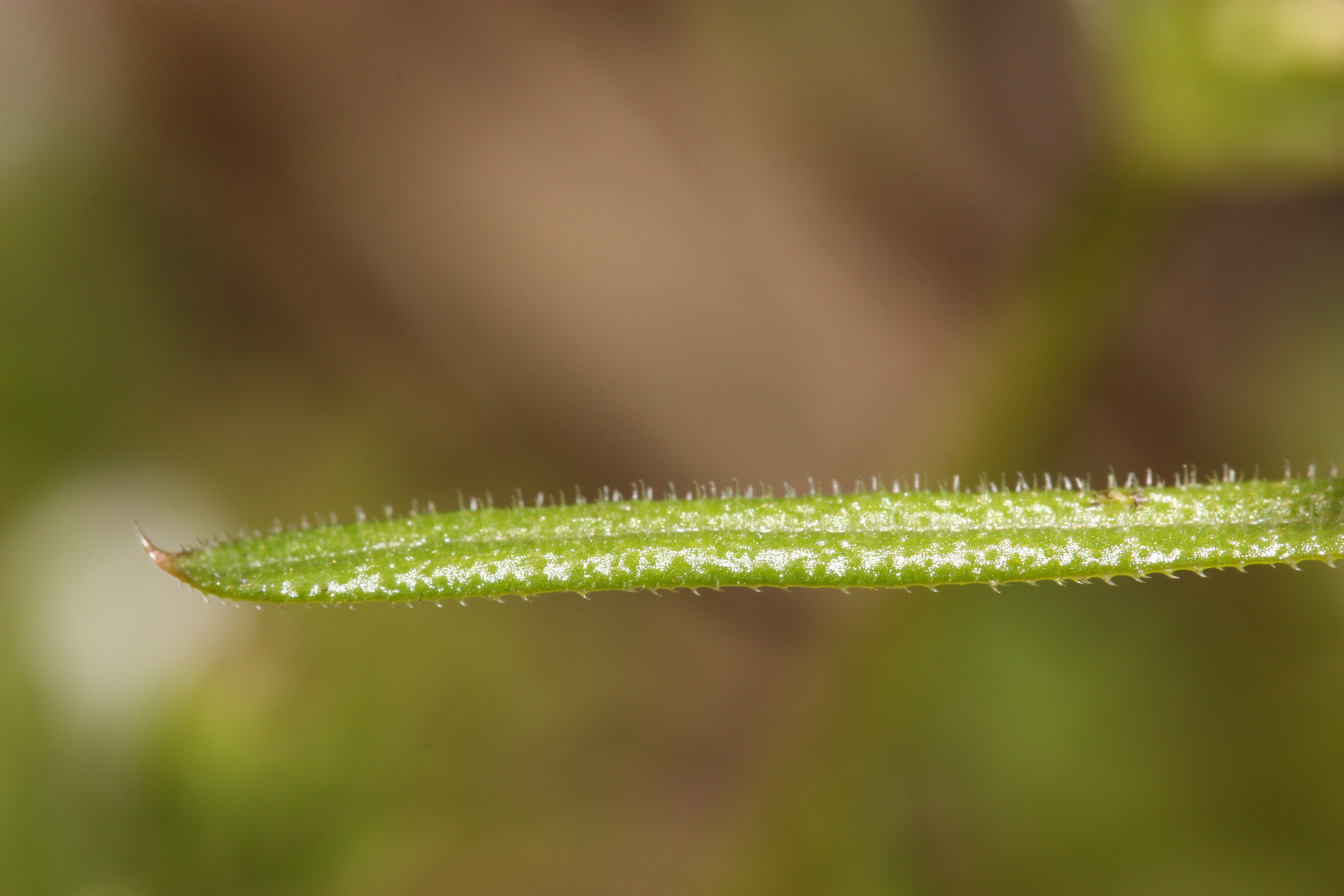
Closeup of G. aparine leaf. Note the hooked barbs used to climb over the substrate.

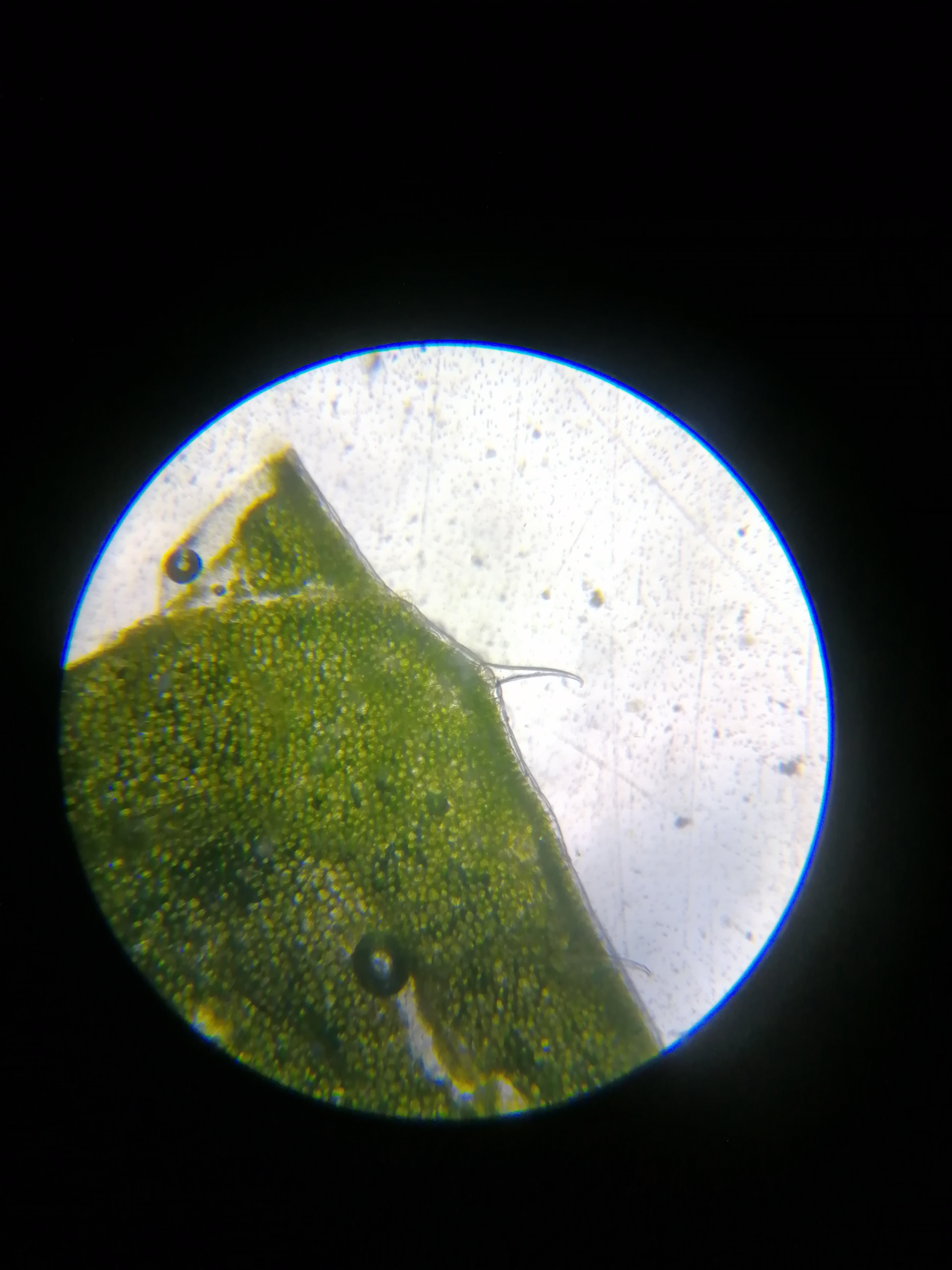
Closeup of the hooked barb (160x)

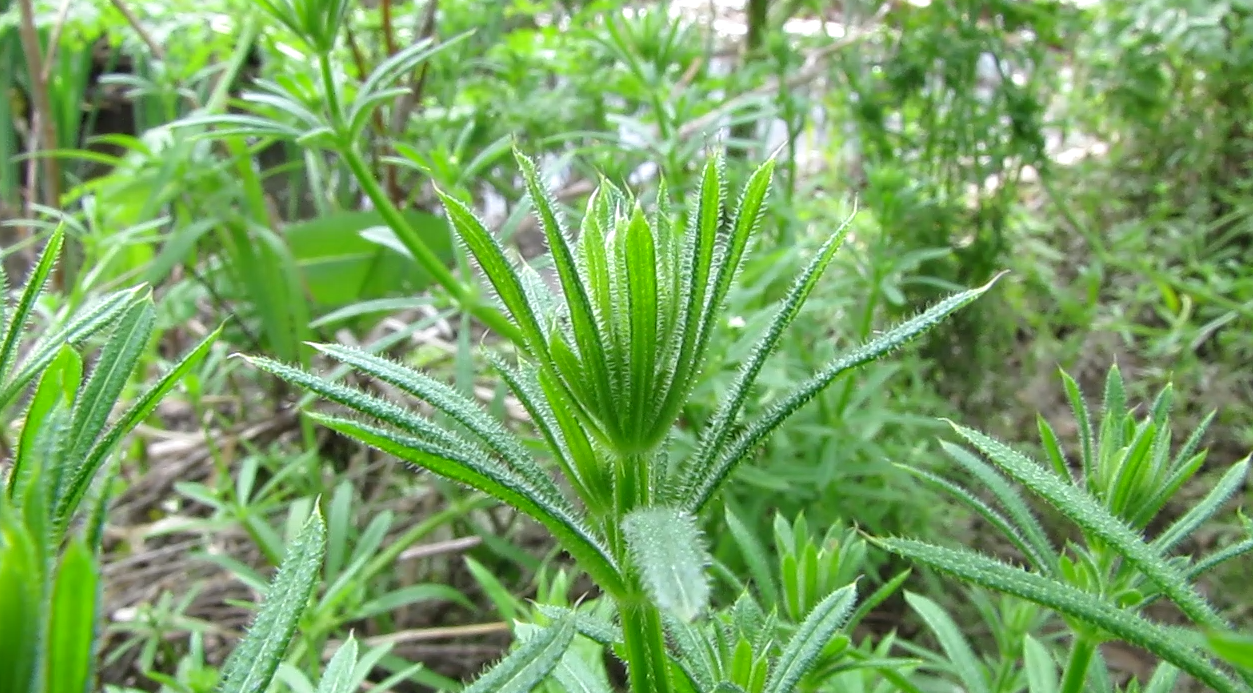
Galium aparine pre-fruiting development, from North America.
