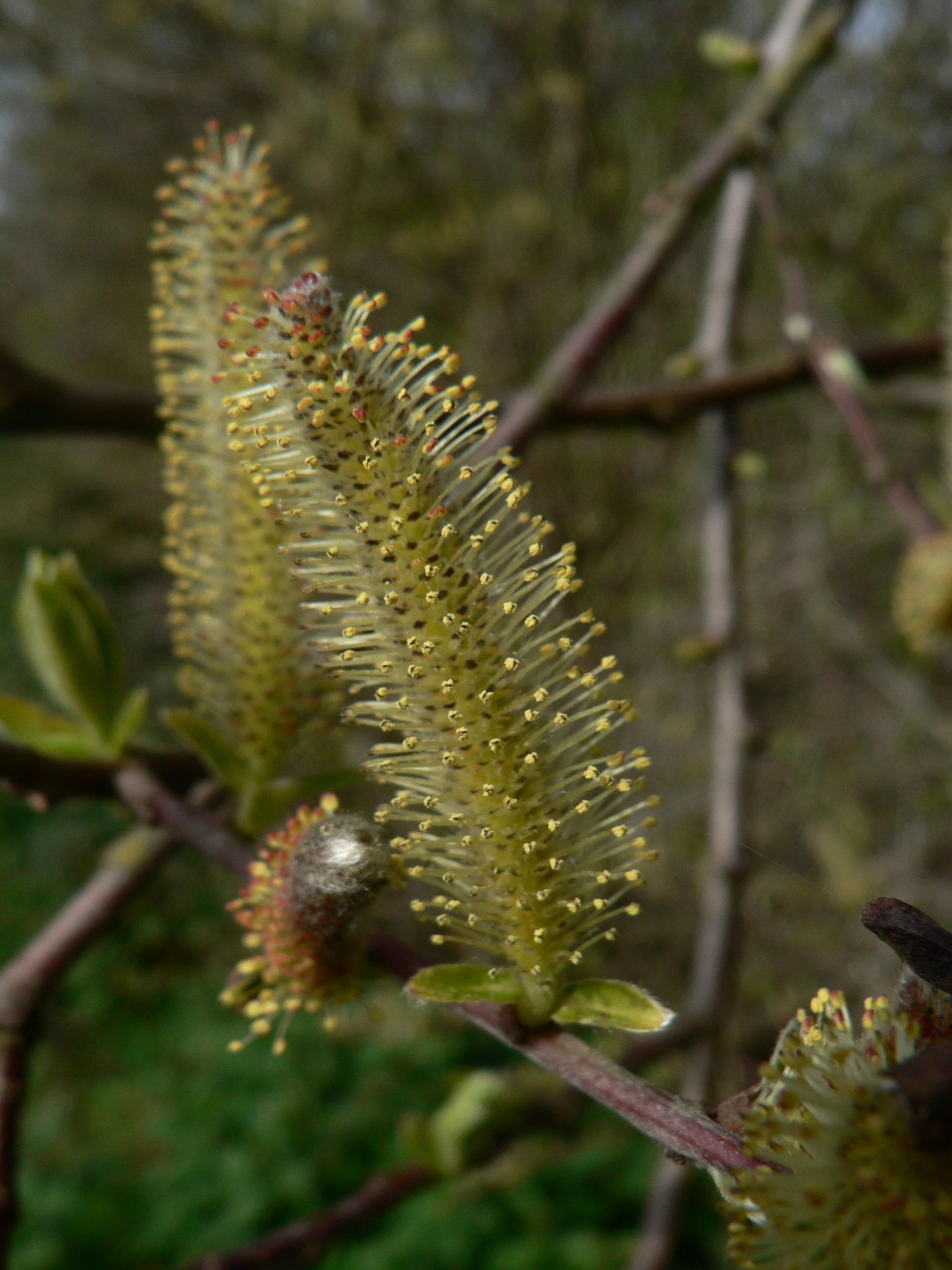

Conservation status
- Least Concern (IUCN 3.1)

Scientific classification
- Kingdom: Plantae
- Clade: Tracheophytes
- Clade: Angiosperms
- Clade: Eudicots
- Clade: Rosids
- Order: Malpighiales
- Family: Salicaceae
- Genus: Salix
- Species: S. sitchensis

Binomial name
- Salix sitchensis Sanson ex Bong.

Synonyms
- Salix coulteri Salix cuneata

= Salix sitchensis =

Species of willow

Salix sitchensis is a species of willow known by the common name Sitka willow.

It is native to northwestern North America from Alaska to northern California to Montana.

It is a common to abundant plant in many types of coastal and inland wetland habitat, such as marshes, riverbanks, swamps, coastal sand dunes, and mountain springs.

== Description ==
Salix sitchensis is variable in appearance, taking the form of a bushy shrub or an erect tree up to 8 m (26 ft) tall. The leaves are up to 12 cm long, lance-shaped or oval with pointed tips, smooth-edged or toothed, often with the edges rolled under. The undersides are hairy to woolly in texture, and the upper surfaces are mostly hairless and dark green.

The inflorescence is a catkin of flowers, slender or short and stout. Male catkins are up to 6 cm long and female catkins are longer, sometimes exceeding 10 cm as the fruits develop. The bloom period is March in California.

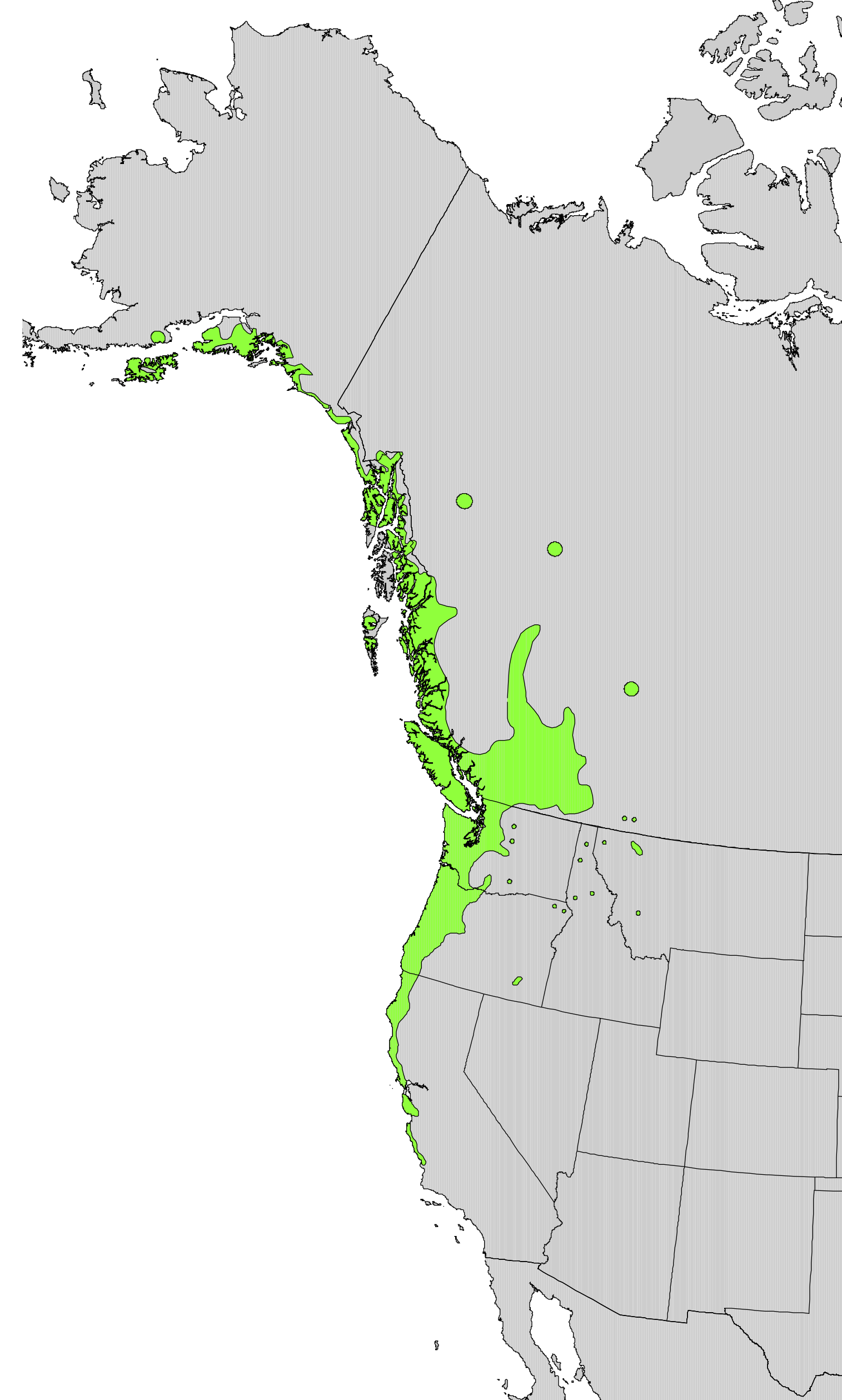
Natural distribution range.
