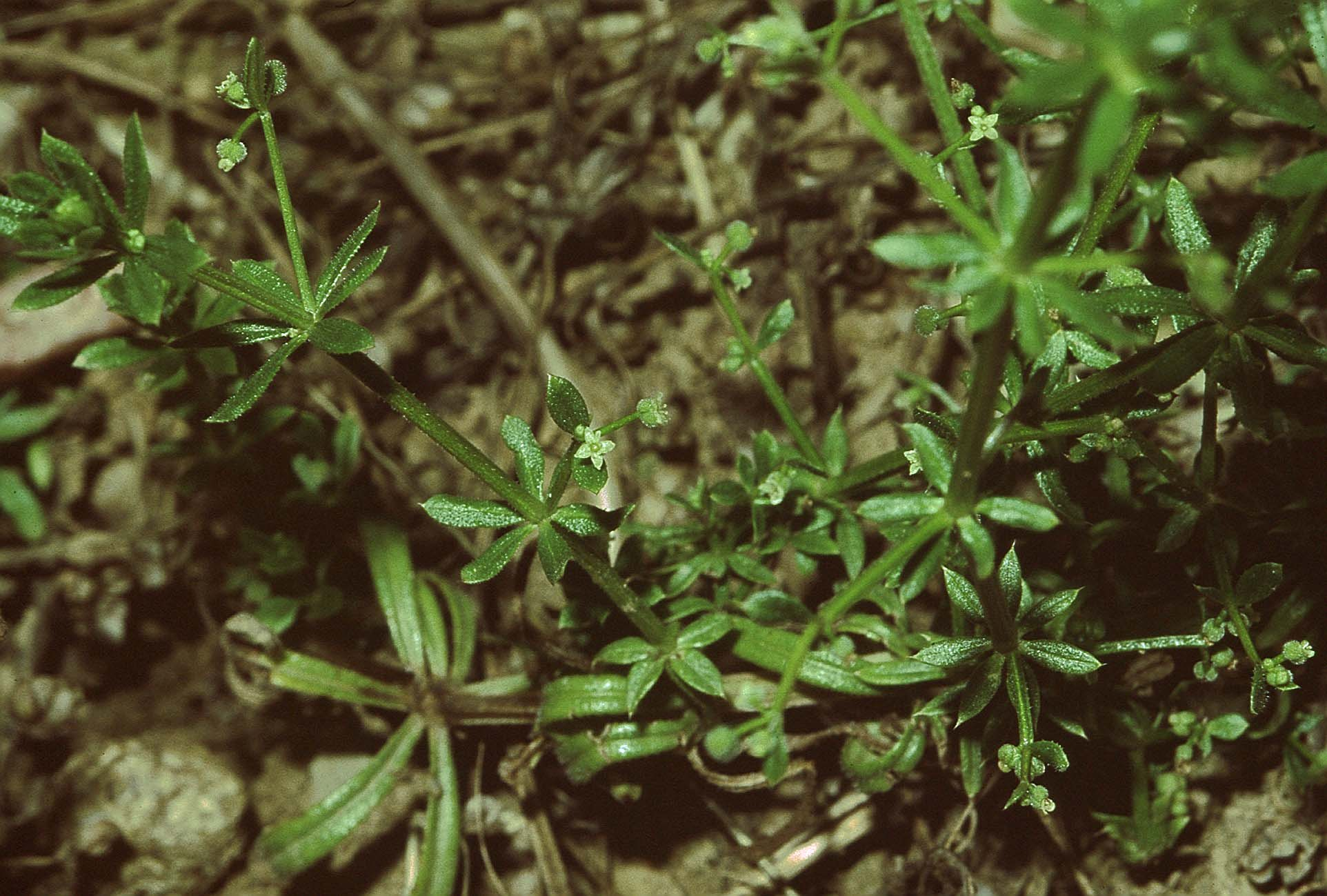

Scientific classification
- Kingdom: Plantae
- Clade: Tracheophytes
- Clade: Angiosperms
- Clade: Eudicots
- Clade: Asterids
- Order: Gentianales
- Family: Rubiaceae
- Genus: Galium
- Species: G. spurium

Binomial name
- Galium spurium L.

Synonyms
- Galium vaillantii DC.

= Galium spurium =

Species of plant

Galium spurium, the stickwilly or false cleavers, is a plant species of the Rubiaceae. It is widespread across Europe, Asia, Africa and Canada, and is naturalized in Australia. It is considered a noxious weed in many places.

Galium spurium is an erect or reclining herb up to 50 cm tall. Stems are square in cross-section. Leaves are in whorls of 6–8, narrowly lanceolate. Flowers are in multi-flowered cymes or panicles, white or yellow-green.

== Subspecies ==
Many varietal and subspecific names have been proposed, but at present (May 2014) only 3 are recognized:

- Galium spurium subsp. africanum Verdc. - mountains of tropical and southern Africa; also Saudi Arabia, Yemen, Socotra
- Galium spurium subsp. ibicinum (Boiss. & Hausskn.) Ehrend. - Turkey, Iran, Iraq, Afghanistan, Pakistan, Turkmenistan, Tajikistan
- Galium spurium subsp. spurium - widespread
