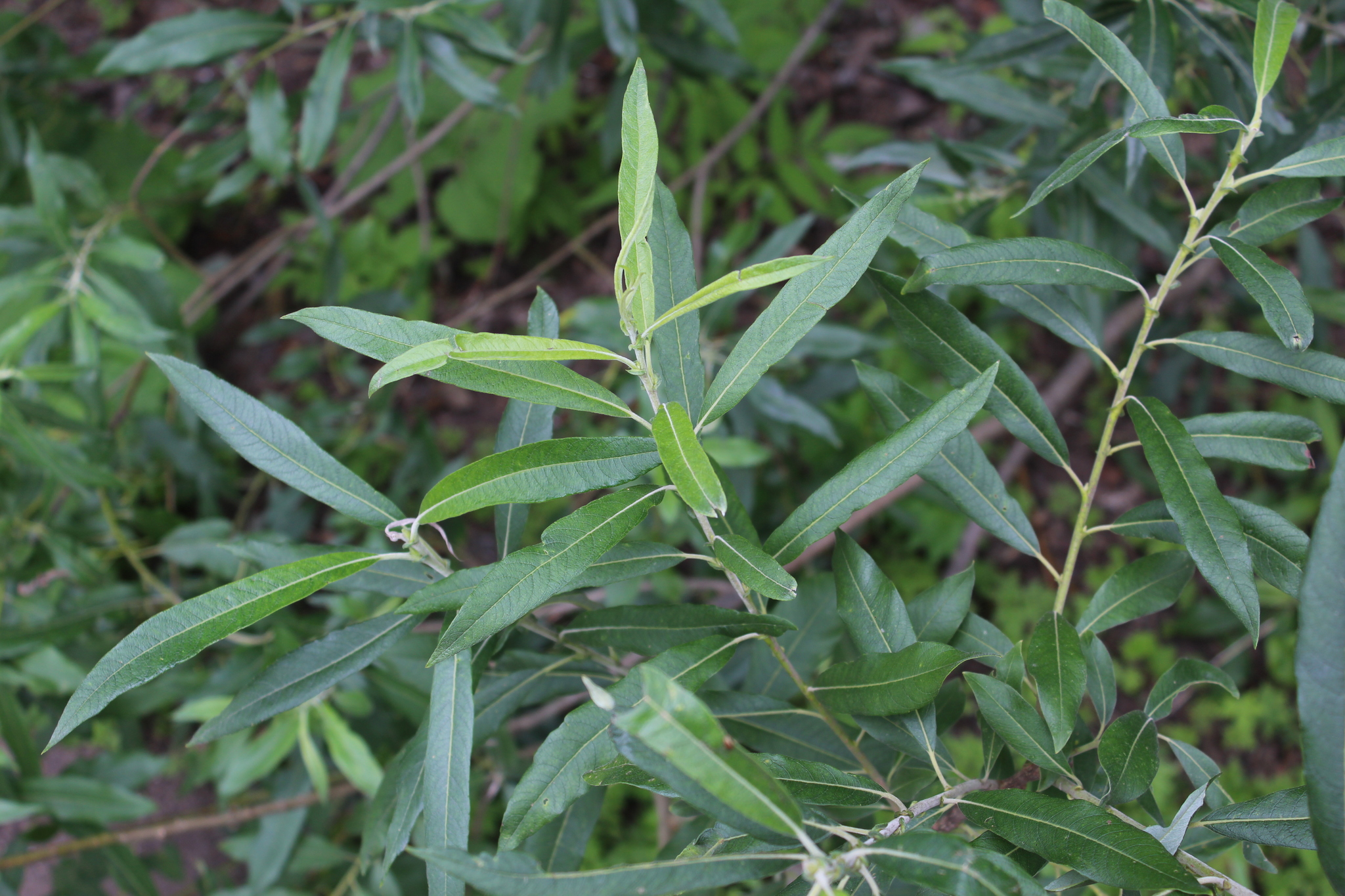

Conservation status
- Data Deficient (IUCN 3.1)

Scientific classification
- Kingdom: Plantae
- Clade: Embryophytes
- Clade: Tracheophytes
- Clade: Spermatophytes
- Clade: Angiosperms
- Clade: Eudicots
- Clade: Rosids
- Order: Malpighiales
- Family: Salicaceae
- Genus: Salix
- Species: S. gmelinii

Binomial name
- Salix gmelinii Pall.

Synonyms
- Salix smithiana Willd.

= Salix gmelinii =

Species of flowering plant

Salix gmelinii is a species of flowering plant belonging to the family Salicaceae.

Its native range is central Europe from Germany, Austria, and Poland east through south-western Siberia to central Asia.
