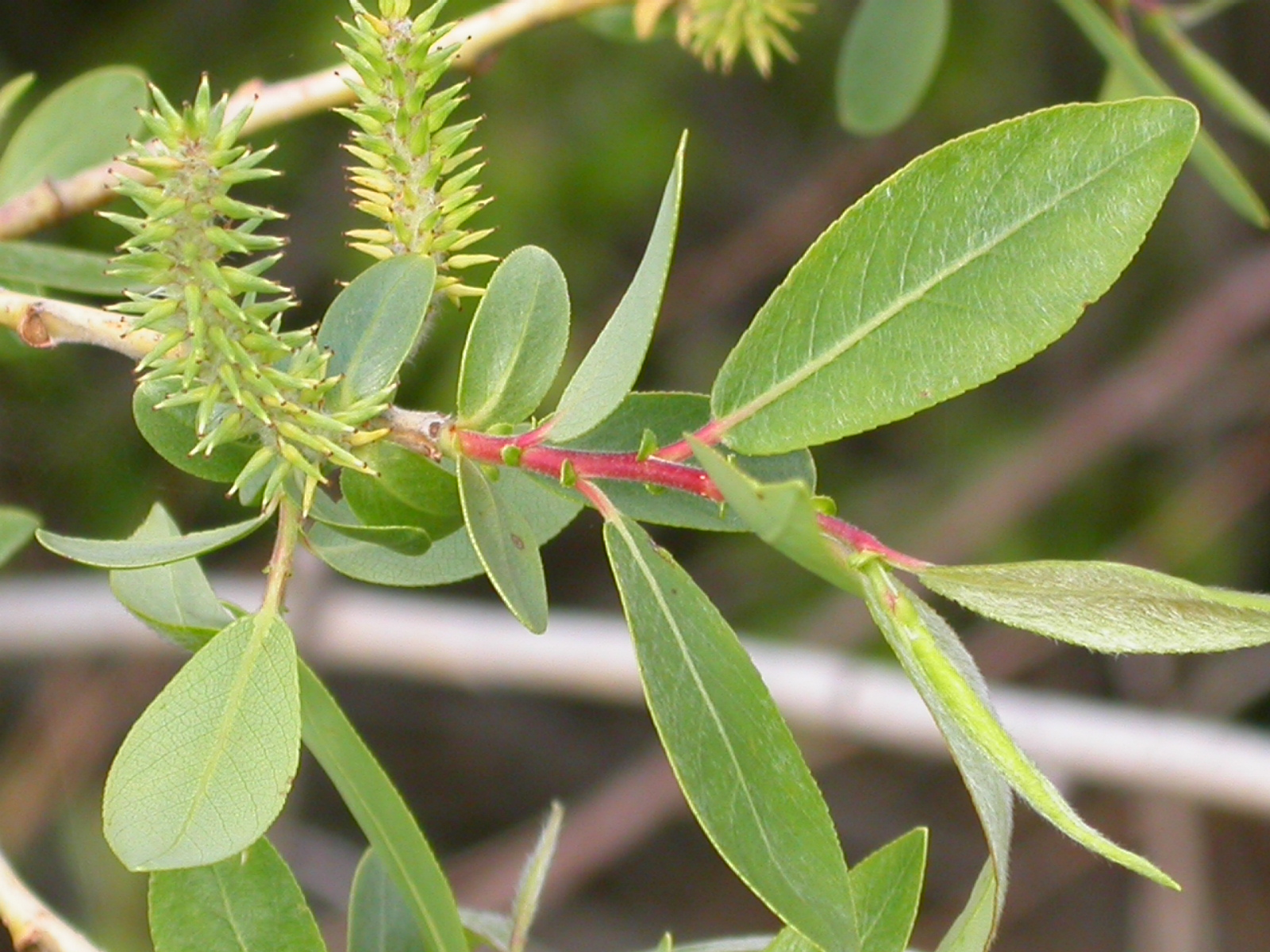

Conservation status
- Least Concern (IUCN 3.1)

Scientific classification
- Kingdom: Plantae
- Clade: Tracheophytes
- Clade: Angiosperms
- Clade: Eudicots
- Clade: Rosids
- Order: Malpighiales
- Family: Salicaceae
- Genus: Salix
- Species: S. eriocephala

Binomial name
- Salix eriocephala Michx.

= Salix eriocephala =

Species of shrub

Salix eriocephala, known as heart-leaved willow or Missouri River willow, is a species of willow native to a large portion of the temperate United States and Canada.

It is usually found as a narrow shrub or small tree with multiple trunks growing to a height of 20 ft (6.1 m). It has dark gray, scaly bark with thick lance-shaped leaves that are hairy underneath. The silky catkins appear before the leaves in early spring.
