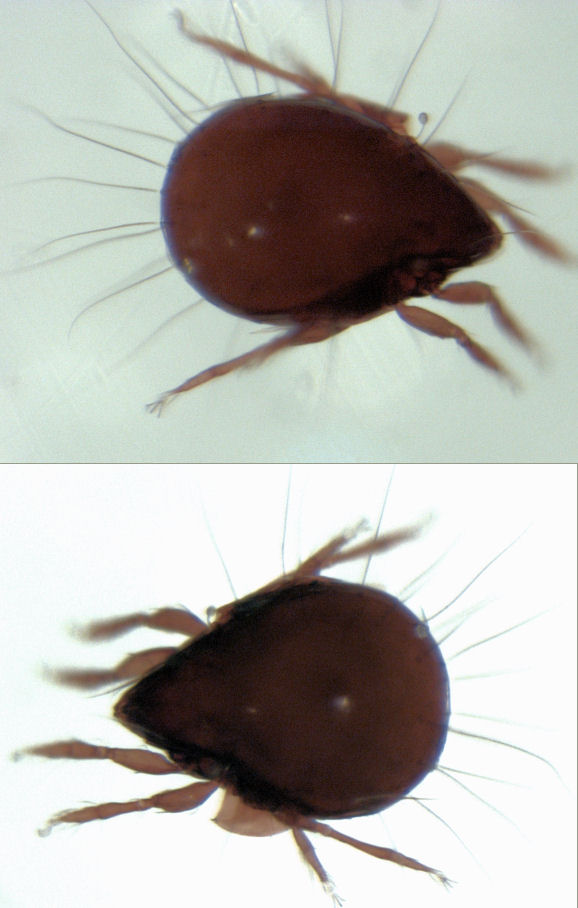
- Peloribates sp. (Haplozetidae)

Scientific classification
- Kingdom: Animalia
- Phylum: Arthropoda
- Subphylum: Chelicerata
- Class: Arachnida
- Order: Oribatida
- Suborder: Brachypylina; Hull, 1918

Superfamilies
- Pycnonoticae Amerobelboidea Ameronothroidea Carabodoidea Cepheoidea Charassobatoidea Cymbaeremaeoidea Damaeoidea Eremaeoidea Eremelloidea Gustavioidea Gymnodamaeoidea Hermannielloidea Hydrozetoidea Microzetoidea Neoliodoidea Oppioidea Otocepheoidea Plateremaeoidea Polypterozetoidea Tectocepheoidea Trizetoidea Zetorchestoidea Poronoticae Achipterioidea Ceratozetoidea Galumnoidea Licneremaeoidea Limnozetoidea Oribatelloidea Oripodoidea Phenopelopoidea Unduloribatoidea Zetomotrichoidea

= Brachypylina =

Brachypylina Temporal range: Jurassic–present

Suborder of mites

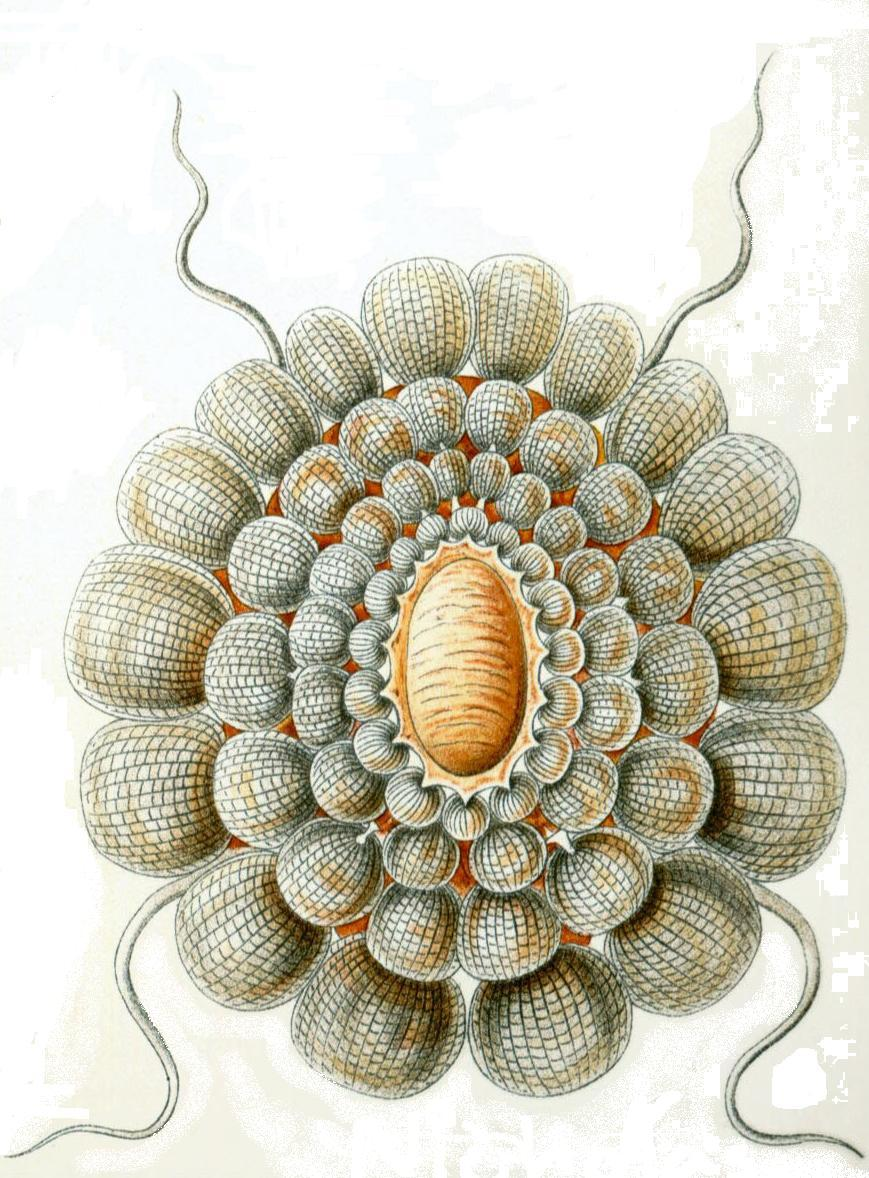
Tereticepheus palmicinctum (Cepheidae)

Brachypylina is a group of oribatid mites, variously listed as a suborder, infraorder, or a cohort.

== Description ==
Brachypylina are 0.15 to 2.0 mm or more in length, beetle-like, usually tan to dark brown, and covered in armour. Some have pteromorphs (wing-like flaps possessed by some oribatids). The notogastral shield is separated from the prodorsal and ventral shields by a line of dehiscence (circumgastric furrow). There is usually a pair of trichobothria on the prodorsum. There are 3 (rarely seemingly 2) pairs of genital papillae. The subcapitulum is often diarthric, and sometimes has a mental tectum or is suctorial.

Females have a well-developed ovipositor. Males are usually half the mass of females with a smaller genital opening, and they have a spermatophoric organ instead of an ovipositor.

== Ecology ==
These mites occur in various habitats including on vegetation. They feed on algae, fungi, detritus and small invertebrates.

In one study of oribatids in German forests, Brachypylina made up the vast majority of oribatids collected (23,168 individuals out of 25,162). The highest densities were found in lichen and mosses, and they made up all of the oribatids found on tree bark. Densities were lower in sod, dead wood and litter.

== Families ==
- Pycnonoticae Grandjean, 1954

- Hermannielloidea Grandjean, 1934
  - Hermanniellidae Grandjean, 1934
  - Plasmobatidae Grandjean, 1961
- Neoliodoidea Sellnick, 1928
  - Neoliodidae Sellnick, 1928
- Plateremaeoidea Trägårdh, 1926
  - Plateremaeidae Trägårdh, 1926
  - Pheroliodidae Paschoal, 1987
  - Licnodamaeidae Grandjean, 1954
  - Licnobelbidae Grandjean, 1965
- Gymnodamaeoidea Grandjean, 1954
  - Gymnodamaeidae Grandjean, 1954
  - Aleurodamaeidae Paschoal & Johnston, 1985
- Damaeoidea Berlese, 1896
  - Damaeidae Berlese, 1896
- Polypterozetoidea Grandjean, 1959
  - Polypterozetidae Grandjean, 1959
  - Podopterotegaeidae Piffl, 1972
- Cepheoidea Berlese, 1896
  - Cepheidae Berlese, 1896
  - Niphocepheidae Travé, 1959
  - Cerocepheidae Subías, 2004
  - Eutegaeidae Balogh, 1965
  - Pterobatidae Balogh & Mahunka, 1977
  - Nodocepheidae Piffl, 1972
  - Tumerozetidae Hammer, 1966
- Charassobatoidea Grandjean, 1958
  - Microtegeidae Balogh, 1972
  - Charassobatidae Grandjean, 1958
  - Nosybeidae Mahunka, 1993
- Microzetoidea Grandjean, 1936
  - Microzetidae Grandjean, 1936
- Zetorchestoidea Michael, 1898
  - Zetorchestidae Michael, 1898
- Gustavioidea Oudemans, 1900
  - Astegistidae Balogh, 1961
  - Multoribulidae Balogh, 1972
  - Ceratoppiidae Kunst, 1971
  - Metrioppiidae Balogh, 1943
  - Gustaviidae Oudemans, 1900
  - Liacaridae Sellnick, 1928
  - Xenillidae Woolley & Higgins, 1966
  - Tenuialidae Jacot, 1929
- Eremaeoidea Oudemans, 1900
  - Kodiakellidae Hammer, 1967
  - Megeremaeidae Woolley e Higgins, 1968
  - Eremaeidae Oudemans, 1900
  - Aribatidae Aoki, Takaku e Ito, 1994
- Amerobelboidea Grandjean, 1954
  - Ctenobelbidae Grandjean, 1965
  - Amerobelbidae Grandjean, 1954
  - Eremulidae Grandjean, 1965
  - Damaeolidae Grandjean, 1965
  - Hungarobelbidae Miko & Travé, 1996
  - Eremobelbidae Balogh, 1961
  - Heterobelbidae Balogh, 1961
  - Basilobelbidae Balogh, 1961
  - Ameridae Bulanova-Zachvatkina, 1957
  - Staurobatidae Grandjean, 1966
- Eremelloidea Balogh, 1961
  - Platyameridae J. & P. Balogh, 1983
  - Caleremaeidae Grandjean, 1965
  - Eremellidae Balogh, 1961
  - Machadobelbidae Balogh, 1972
  - Oribellidae Kunst, 1971
  - Arceremaeidae Balogh, 1972
  - Spinozetidae Balogh, 1972
- Oppioidea Sellnick, 1937
  - Autognetidae Grandjean, 1960
  - Thyrisomidae Grandjean, 1953
  - Oppiidae Sellnick, 1937
  - Epimerellidae Ayyildiz & Luxton, 1989
  - Lyroppiidae Balogh, 1983
  - Granuloppiidae Balogh, 1983
  - Teratoppiidae Balogh, 1983
  - Sternoppiidae Balogh & Mahunka, 1969
  - Machuellidae Balogh, 1983
  - Papillonotidae Balogh, 1983
  - Tuparezetidae Balogh, 1972
  - Quadroppiidae Balogh, 1983
- Trizetoidea Ewing, 1917
  - Nosybelbidae Mahunka, 1994
  - Cuneoppiidae Balogh, 1983
  - Suctobelbidae Jacot, 1938
  - Rhynchoribatidae Balogh, 1961
  - Oxyameridae Aoki, 1965
  - Trizetidae Ewing, 1917
- Otocepheoidea Balogh, 1961
  - Dampfiellidae Balogh, 1961
  - Tetracondylidae Aoki, 1961
  - Otocepheidae Balogh, 1961
  - Tokunocepheidae Aoki, 1966
- Carabodoidea Koch, 1837
  - Carabodidae Koch, 1837
  - Carabocepheidae Mahunka, 1986
  - Nippobodidae Aoki, 1959
- Tectocepheoidea Grandjean, 1954
  - Tectocepheidae Grandjean, 1954
  - Tegeocranellidae P. Balogh, 1987
- Hydrozetoidea Grandjean, 1954
  - Hydrozetidae Grandjean, 1954
- Ameronothroidea Willmann, 1931
  - Ameronothridae Willmann, 1931
  - Selenoribatidae Schuster, 1963
  - Fortuyniidae Hammen, 1963
- Cymbaeremaeoidea Sellnick, 1928
  - Adhaesozetidae Hammer, 1973
  - Cymbaeremaeidae Sellnick, 1928
  - Ametroproctidae Subías, 2004

- Poronoticae Grandjean, 1954

- Licneremaeoidea Grandjean, 1931
  - Dendroeremaeidae Behan-Pelletier, Eamer & Clayton, 2005
  - Micreremidae Grandjean, 1954
  - Lamellareidae Balogh, 1972
  - Licneremaeidae Grandjean, 1931
  - Scutoverticidae Grandjean, 1954
  - Passalozetidae Grandjean, 1954
- Phenopelopoidea Petrunkevitch, 1955
  - Phenopelopidae Petrunkevitch, 1955
- Unduloribatoidea Kunst, 1971
  - Unduloribatidae Kunst, 1971
  - Eremaeozetidae Piffl, 1972
  - Idiozetidae Aoki, 1976
- Limnozetoidea Thor, 1937
  - Limnozetidae Thor, 1937
  - Austrachipteriidae Luxton, 1985
- Achipterioidea Thor, 1929
  - Achipteriidae Thor, 1929
  - Tegoribatidae Grandjean, 1954
- Oribatelloidea Jacot, 1925
  - Oribatellidae Jacot, 1925
  - Ceratokalummidae Balogh, 1970
  - Epactozetidae Grandjean, 1930
- Ceratozetoidea Jacot, 1925
  - Heterozetidae Kunst, 1971
  - Ceratozetidae Jacot, 1925
  - Chamobatidae Thor, 1937
  - Humerobatidae Grandjean, 1970
  - Punctoribatidae Thor, 1937
- Zetomotrichoidea Grandjean, 1934
  - Zetomotrichidae Grandjean, 1934
- Oripodoidea Jacot, 1925
  - Drymobatidae J. & P. Balogh, 1984
  - Mochlozetidae Grandjean, 1960
  - Neotrichozetidae Balogh, 1965
  - Oribatulidae Thor, 1929
  - Nesozetidae J. & P. Balogh, 1984
  - Pseudoppiidae Mahunka, 1975
  - Parapirnodidae Aoki & Ohkubo, 1974
  - Caloppiidae Balogh, 1960
  - Hemileiidae J. & P. Balogh, 1984
  - Maudheimiidae J. & P. Balogh, 1984
  - Liebstadiidae J. & P. Balogh, 1984
  - Symbioribatidae Aoki, 1966
  - Scheloribatidae Jacot, 1935
  - Oripodidae Jacot, 1925
  - Pirnodidae Grandjean, 1956
  - Protoribatidae J. & P. Balogh, 1984
  - Haplozetidae Grandjean, 1936
  - Nasobatidae Balogh, 1972
  - Tubulozetidae P. Balogh, 1989
- Galumnoidea Jacot, 1925
  - Parakalummidae Grandjean, 1936
  - Galumnidae Jacot, 1925
  - Galumnellidae Piffl, 1970
