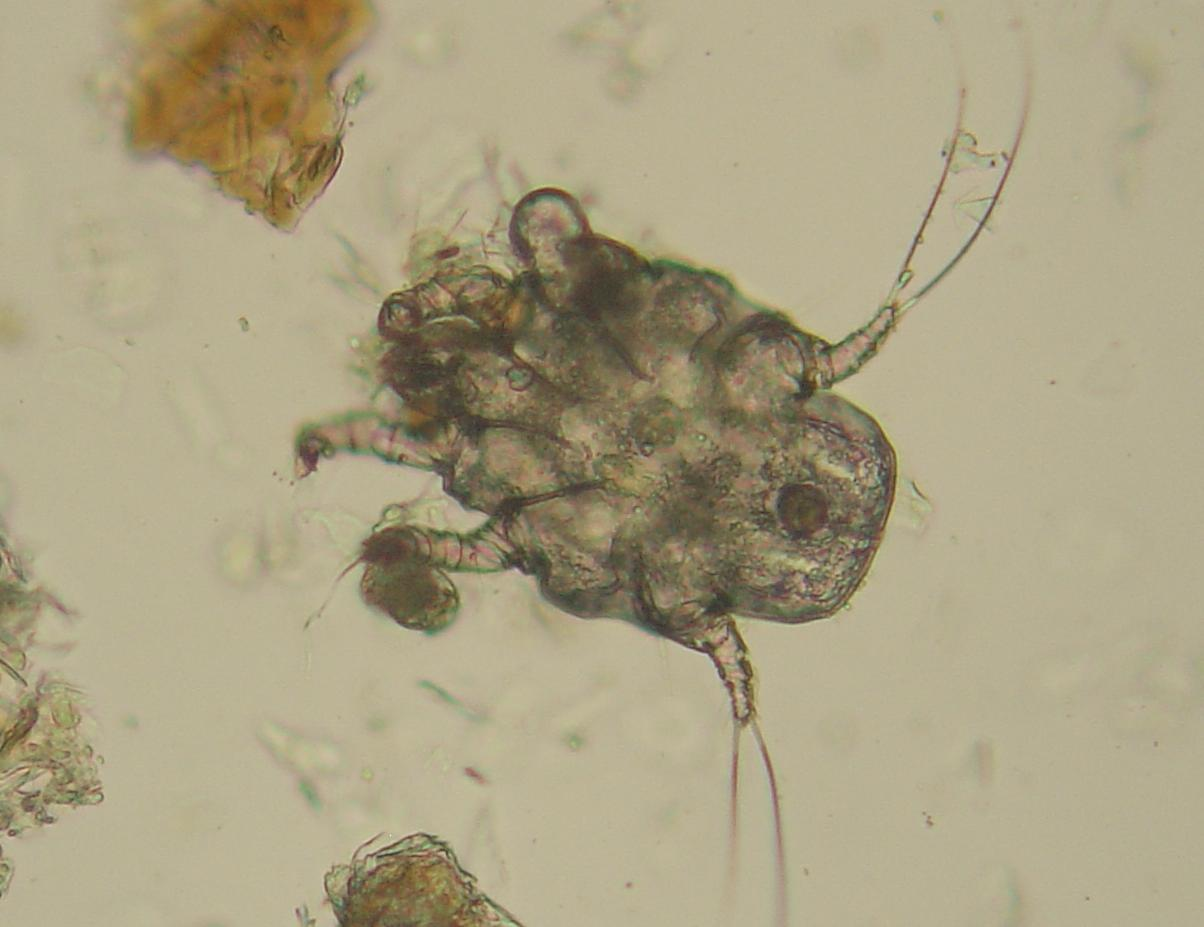
- Otodectes cyanotis (Psoroptidia: Psoroptidae)

Scientific classification
- Kingdom: Animalia
- Phylum: Arthropoda
- Subphylum: Chelicerata
- Class: Arachnida
- Order: Sarcoptiformes
- (unranked): Astigmatina; Canestrini, 1891

Superfamilies
- Acaridia Acaroidea Canestrinioidea Glycyphagoidea Hemisarcoptoidea Histiostomatoidea Hypoderoidea Schizoglyphoidea Psoroptidia Analgoidea Freyanoidea Psoroptoidea Pterolichoidea Pyroglyphoidea

Diversity
- c. 76 families > 1,000 genera > 3,400 species

= Astigmatina =

Astigmatina Temporal range: Palaeogene–present

Group of mites

Astigmatina is a clade of mites in the order Sarcoptiformes. Astigmata has been ranked as an order or suborder in the past, but was lowered to the unranked clade Astigmatina of the clade Desmonomatides (synonym Desmonomata) in the order. Astigmatina is now made up of the two groups Acaridia and Psoroptidia, which have been suborders of the order Astigmata in the past. Astigmatina contains about 10 superfamilies and 76 families under Acaridia and Psoroptidia.

== Description ==
Astigmatan mites are usually soft-bodied and white to brownish in colour (rarely tan and well-sclerotised), and range from 0.15 to 2.00 mm in length. They lack stigmatal openings (thus the name of the clade) and peritremes, making them rely on cutaneous respiration in the absence of a respiratory system. Also prodorsal sensilla is absent. The gnathosoma (mouthparts) is usually exposed. They have a pair of chelicerae that are 2-segmented and usually chelate-dentate in shape (whip-like in Histiostomatidae). Opisthosomal glands are present and usually well-developed.

Some features vary depending on the life stage. Larvae have six legs (hexapod) whereas nymphs and adults have eight legs (octopod). The genital opening has one pair of genital papillae in the protonymph (first nymphal stage), but two pairs in the tritonymph (last nymphal stage) and adult.

Some astigmatans have a deutonymph stage which looks very different from other stages (heteromorphic). This is usually adapted for phoresy (attachment to a larger animal for transport), being well-sclerotised (to resist desiccation), with a reduced gnathosoma and a solid, non-functional foregut (as deutonymphs generally do not feed) and usually a posteroventral attachment organ. Some lineages have two possible types of heteromorphic deutonymph, with the other being sac-like and immobile (immobile heteromorphic deutonymph). The purpose of this deutonymph type is to survive environmental stresses for long periods of time.

Males have an aedeagus in a usually postcoxal position. Females have a secondary sperm-receiving structure with a bursa copulatrix.

== Ecology ==
Unlike their oribatid ancestors, which are mostly restricted to soil, the Astigmatina show a wide range of ecological strategies. The Histiostomatoidea live in various wet substrates such as decaying plant tissue, dung, mud and tree holes, and feed on organic material. The Glycyphagoidea live in mammal nests, human houses and stored foods. The Pyroglyphoidea live in houses as house dust mites. Many Acaroidea live in stored foods, but the superfamily also includes plant pests and inhabitants of vertebrate or insect nests. The majority of Hemisarcoptoidea are kleptoparasites. The Canestrinoidea are parasites feeding on exudates of beetles. The also-parasitic Sarcoptoidea live in mammal fur and skin. Several superfamilies are exclusively associated with birds (Pterolichoidea, Freyanoidea and Analgoidea) or bird nests (Hypoderatoidea).

Among the mites occurring in soil, Astigmatina is the least common group, though they may be common in some habitats. Their populations in agricultural soils increase after harvesting or the application of rich manures. Most soil-dwelling Astigmatina are microbe feeders, though the species with chelate chelicerae can chew on vegetable material, fungi and algae.

Several astigmatan families are obligate associates of bees, which feed within bee nests. The genus Chaetodactylus can form both phoretic deutonymphs (to disperse to new nests on adult bees) and immobile deutonymphs (to survive in old nests so they can infest bees that reuse nests).

== Economic importance ==
Astigmatina in homes damage stored products, disperse microbial propagules and contribute to allergic reactions. The parasitic species cause diseases such as scabies and mange. A few acarid species are minor pests of seedling crops.

There are also beneficial species of Astigmatina. Hemisarcoptes (Hemisarcoptidae) are parasites of armoured scale insects, which are plant pests.

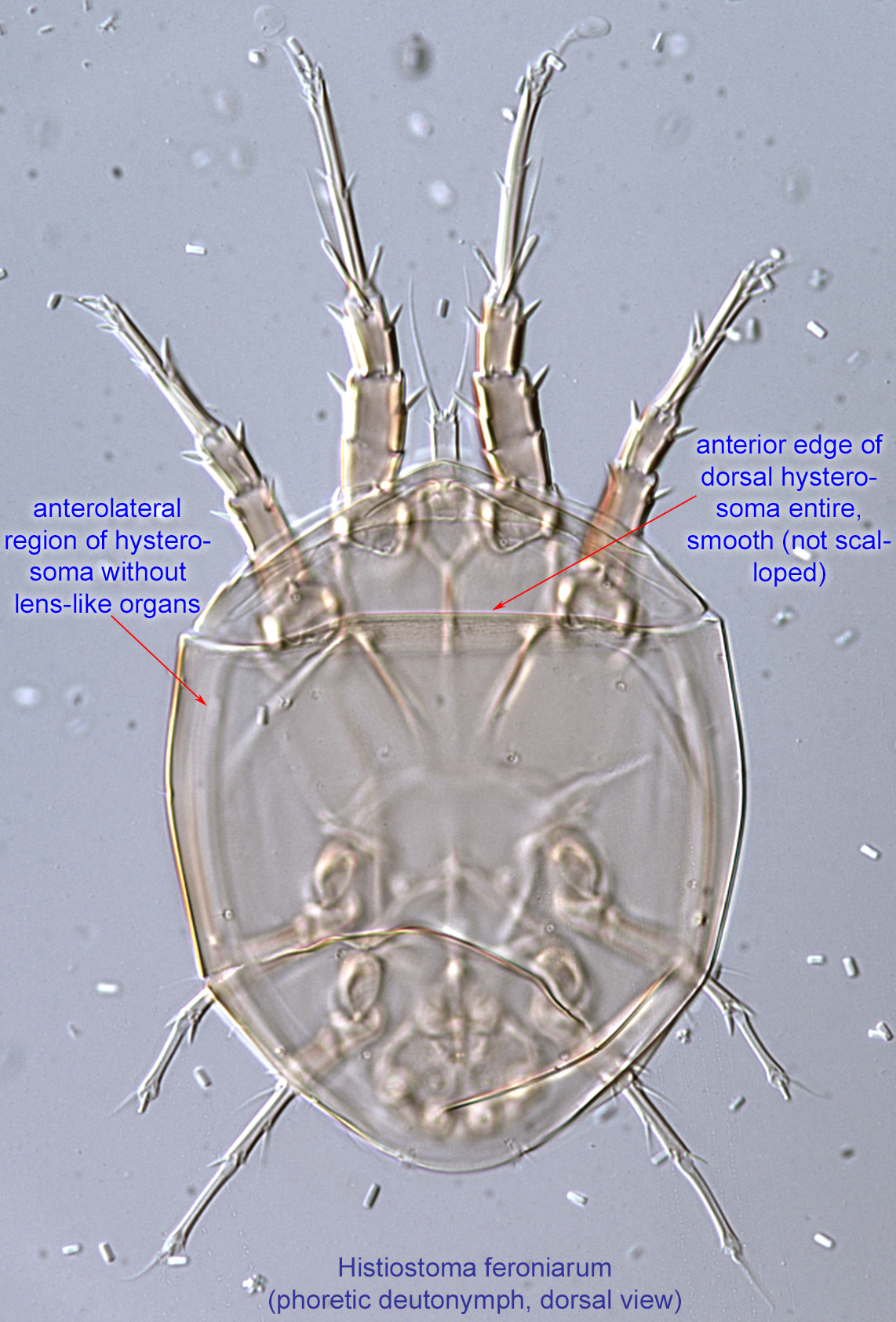
Deutonymph of Histiostoma feroniarum (Histiostomatoidea: Histiostomatidae)

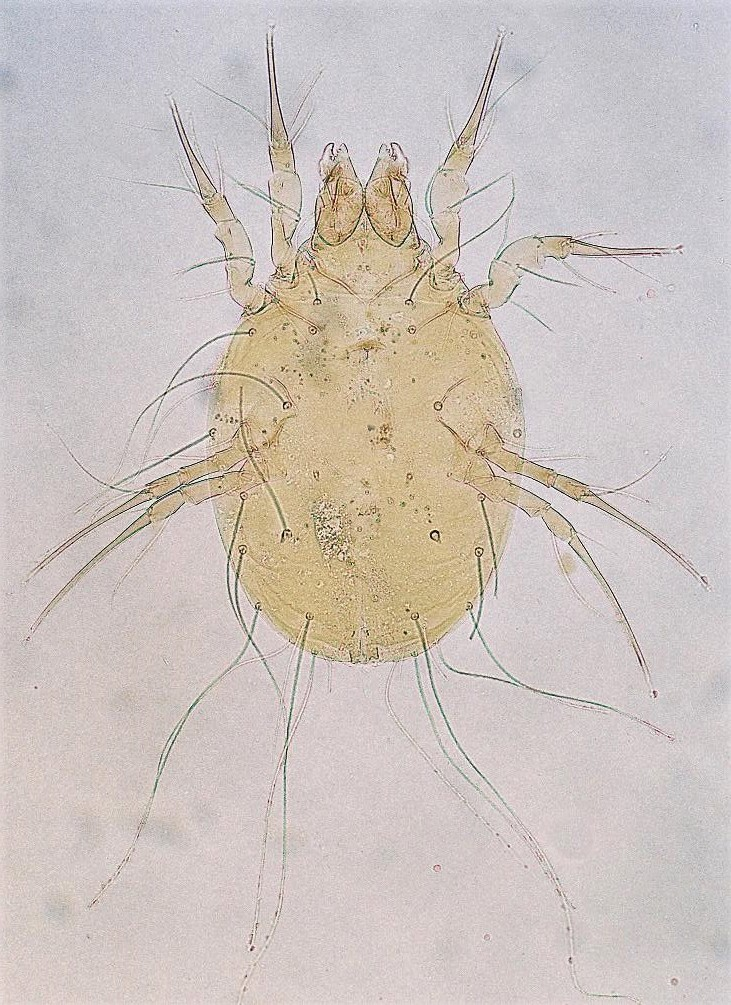
Glycyphagus sp. (Glycyphagoidea: Glycyphagidae)

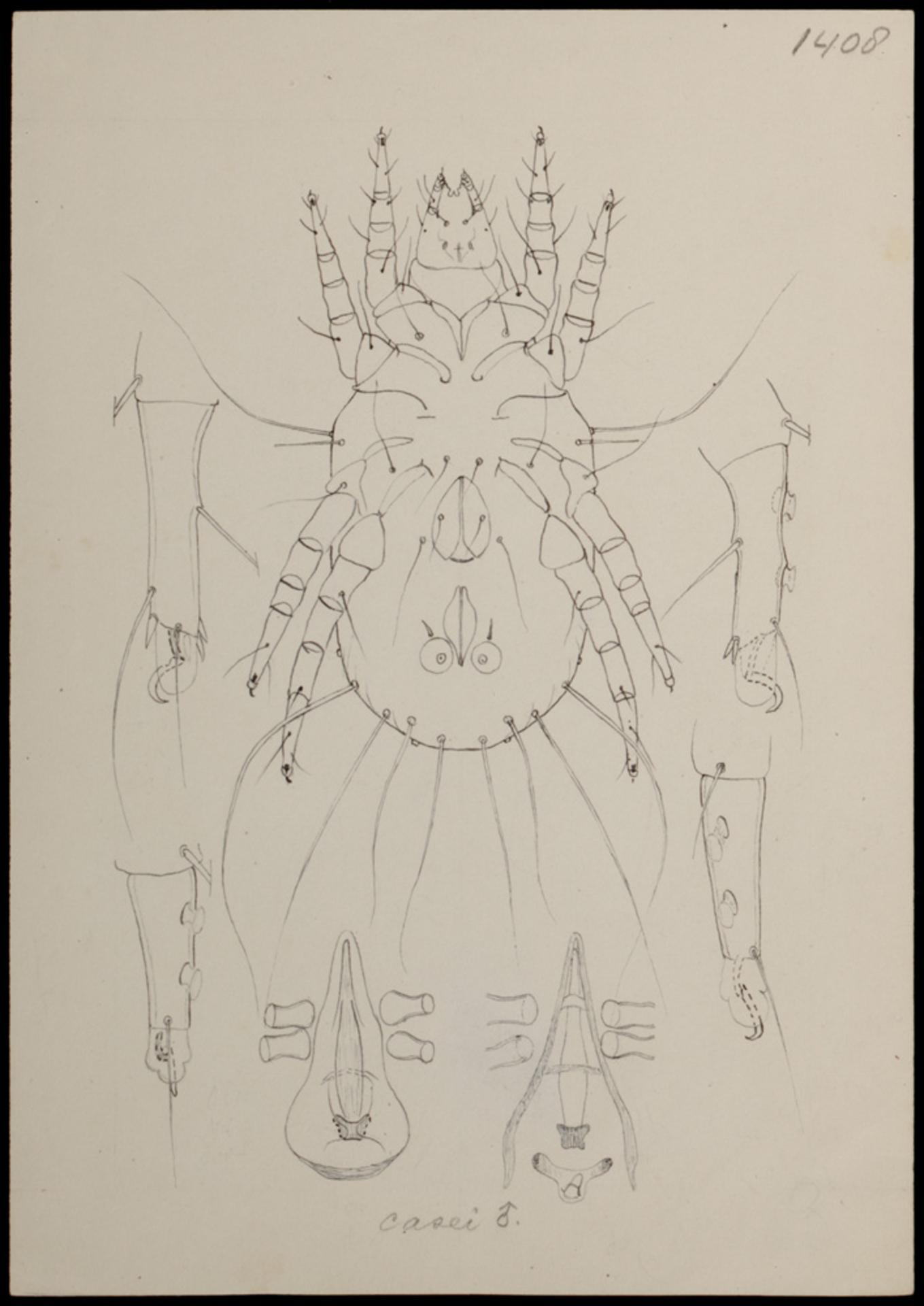
Tyrophagus casei (Acaroidea: Acaridae)

== Taxonomy ==
Astigmatina contains about 11 superfamilies with thousands of genera, as follows:

Acaridia (> 400 genera, > 1300 species)

- Schizoglyphoidea (2 genera, 2 species)
  - Schizoglyphidae
- Histiostomatoidea (c. 60 genera, > 200 species)
  - Histiostomatidae
  - Guanolichidae
- Canestrinioidea (> 100 genera, > 300 species)
  - Chetochelacaridae
  - Lophonotacaridae
  - Canestriniidae
  - Heterocoptidae
- Hemisarcoptoidea (50 genera, > 200 species)
  - Chaetodactylidae
  - Hyadesiidae
  - Carpoglyphidae
  - Algophagidae
  - Hemisarcoptidae
  - Winterschmidtiidae
- Glycyphagoidea (> 70 genera, > 150 species)
  - Euglycyphagidae
  - Chortoglyphidae
  - Pedetropodidae
  - Echimyopodidae
  - Aeroglyphidae
  - Rosensteiniidae
  - Glycyphagidae
- Acaroidea (> 120 genera, > 500 species)
  - Sapracaridae
  - Suidasiidae
  - Lardoglyphidae
  - Glycacaridae
  - Gaudiellidae
  - Acaridae (> 110 genera, > 400 species)
- Hypoderoidea
  - Hypoderidae

Psoroptidia (> 600 genera, > 2,000 species)

- Pterolichoidea (> 200 genera, > 500 species)
  - Oconnoriidae
  - Ptiloxenidae
  - Pterolichidae (> 100 genera, c. 300 species)
  - Cheylabididae
  - Ochrolichidae
  - Gabuciniidae
  - Falculiferidae
  - Eustathiidae
  - Crypturoptidae
  - Thoracosathesidae
  - Rectijanuidae
  - Ascouracaridae
  - Syringobiidae
  - Kiwilichidae
  - Kramerellidae
- Freyanoidea (> 30 genera, c. 50 species)
  - Freyanidae
  - Vexillariidae
  - Caudiferidae
- Analgoidea (> 200 genera, c. 700 species)
  - Heteropsoridae
  - Analgidae
  - Xolalgidae
  - Avenzoariidae
  - Pteronyssidae
  - Proctophyllodidae
  - Psoroptoididae
  - Trouessartiidae
  - Alloptidae
  - Thysanocercidae
  - Dermationidae
  - Epidermoptidae
  - Apionacaridae
  - Dermoglyphidae
  - Laminosioptidae
  - Knemidokoptidae
  - Cytoditidae
- Pyroglyphoidea (26 genera, > 50 species)
  - Pyroglyphidae
  - Turbinoptidae
- Psoroptoidea (c. 160 genera, > 600 species)
  - Psoroptidae
  - Galagalgidae
  - Lobalgidae
  - Myocoptidae
  - Rhyncoptidae
  - Audycoptidae
  - Listrophoridae
  - Chirodiscidae
  - Atopomelidae
  - Chirorhynchobiidae
  - Gastronyssidae
  - Lemurnyssidae
  - Pneumocoptidae
  - Sarcoptidae
- incertae sedis (16 genera, 17 species)
  - Ptyssalgidae
    - Ptyssalges major (Trouessart, 1887)
  - Psoralgidae

=== incertae sedis ===
Troglotacaridae

- Troglotacarus hauseri Fain, 1977
