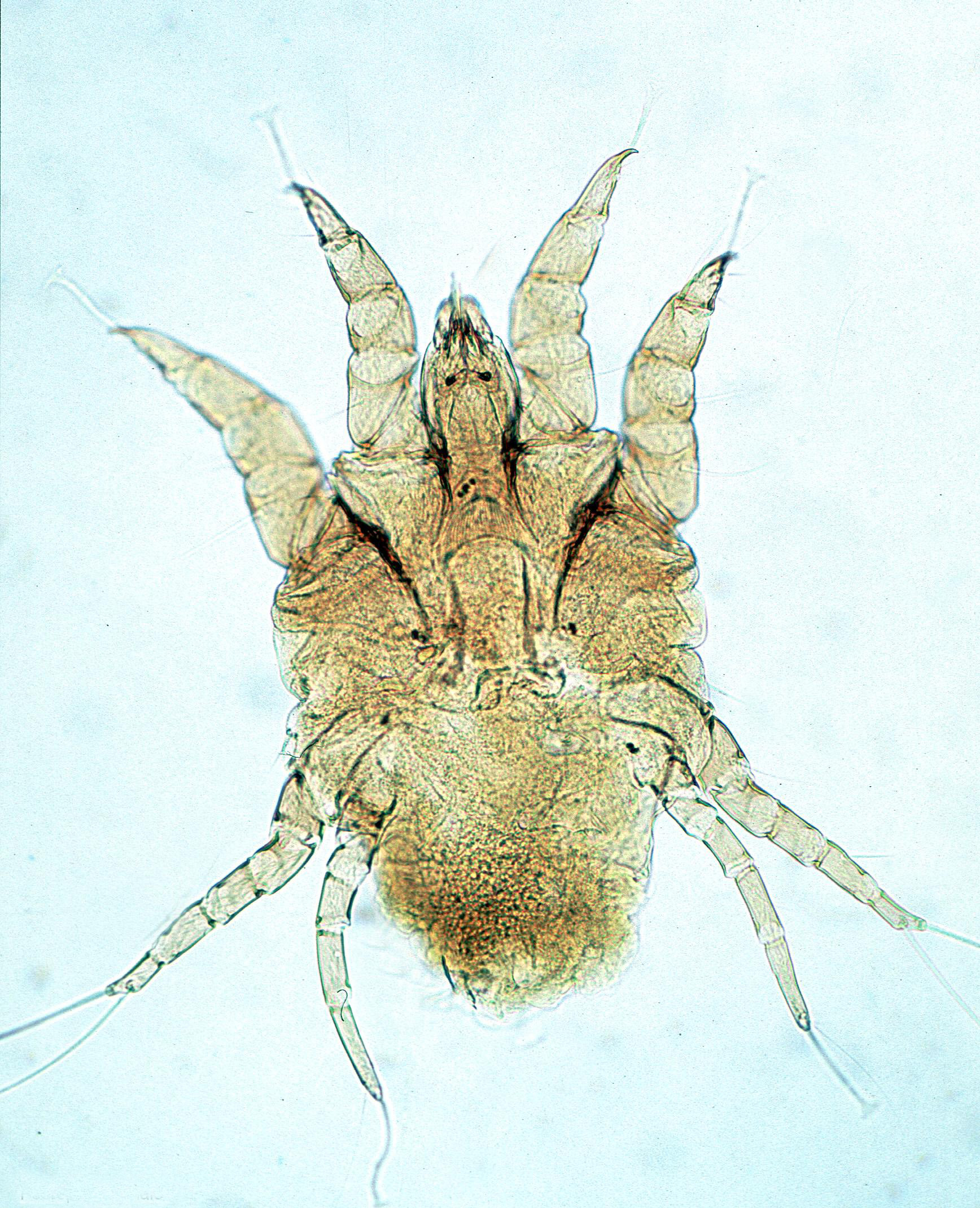
- Psoroptes cuniculi mite

Scientific classification
- Kingdom: Animalia
- Phylum: Arthropoda
- Subphylum: Chelicerata
- Class: Arachnida
- Order: Sarcoptiformes
- Parvorder: Psoroptidia
- Superfamily: Sarcoptoidea

Families
- Atopomelidae; Chirodiscidae; Gastronyssidae; Listrophoridae; Lobalgidae; Myocoptidae; Psoroptidae; Rhyncoptidae; Sarcoptidae

= Sarcoptoidea =

Superfamily of mites

Sarcoptoidea is a superfamily of mites, including many associated with mammals.
