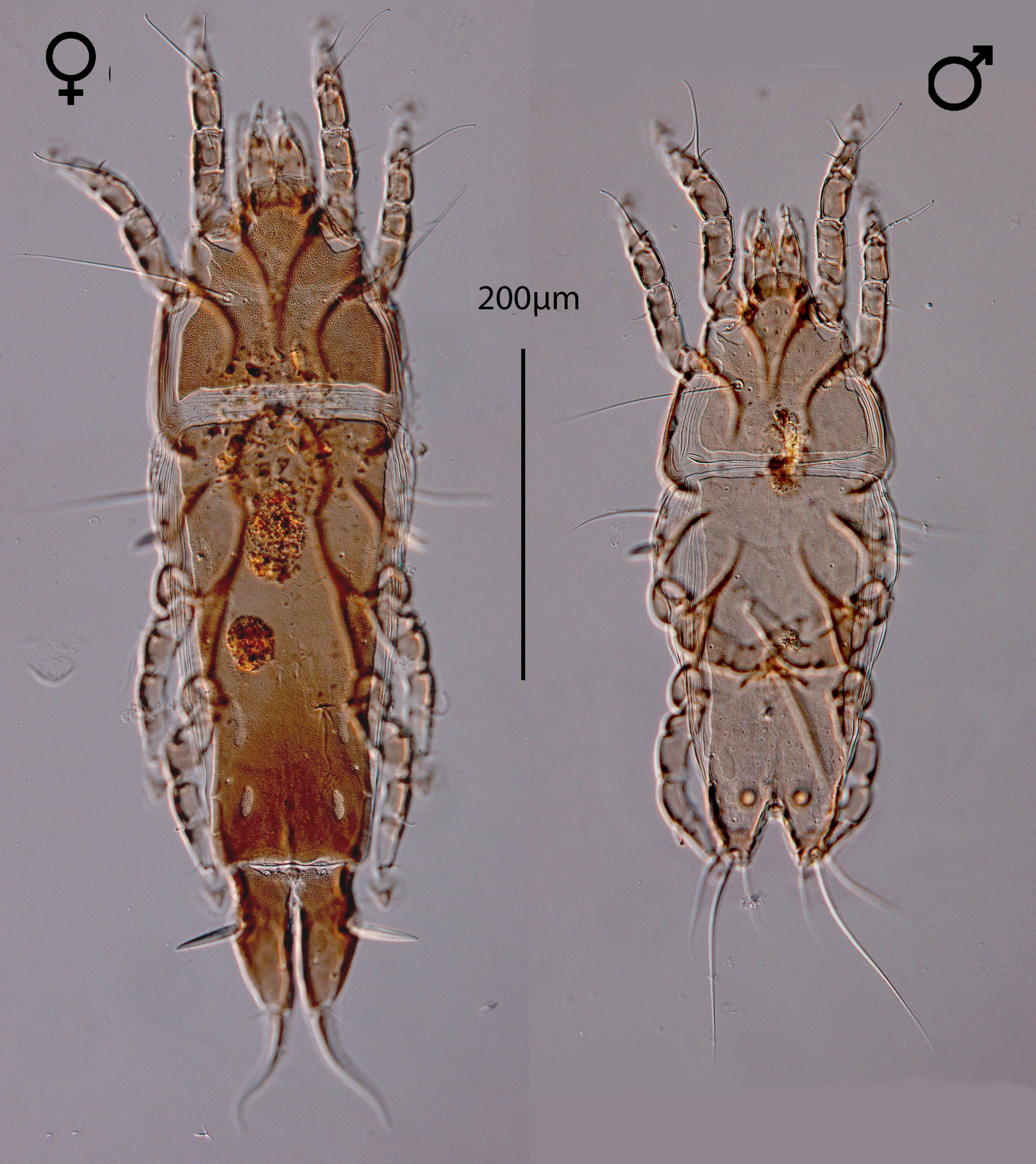
- Amerodectes zonotrichiae female and male

Scientific classification
- Kingdom: Animalia
- Phylum: Arthropoda
- Subphylum: Chelicerata
- Class: Arachnida
- Order: Sarcoptiformes
- Suborder: Astigmata
- Parvorder: Psoroptidia
- Superfamily: Analgoidea
- Family: Proctophyllodidae; Trouessart & Mégnin, 1884

Subfamilies
- Proctophyllodinae; Pterodectinae

= Proctophyllodidae =

Family of mites

The Proctophyllodidae are a family of the Acarina (mite) order Astigmata. They contain many feather mites. The Alloptidae and Trouessartiidae were in earlier times included here as subfamilies.

Proctophyllodidae females are extremely similar among species and sometimes even hard to assign to a genus, while males vary much more. Two subfamilies are generally recognized, the Proctophyllodinae and the Pterodectinae. The main difference is that the female pregenital apodeme and epimerites IV are separated, while in the latter they are connected and form a distinct structure.

== General ==
Feather mites (subclass Acarina, family Proctophyllodinae) are ectoparasites that live in between the barbs of feathers and are found on nearly every bird species currently described. It was previously believed that these mites had a parasitic relationship with their hosts but it is now thought that most species are more commensal with their hosts. Morphological studies have provided strong evidence for this with feather mite mouthparts being identified as unstructured for biting on solid material. Instead it is suggested that they feed on oils and fats secreted from the uropygial gland as well as pollen, fungus and dead epidermis tissue that is trapped within it.

== Morphology ==
Feather mites are streamlined; strongly dorsoventrally flattened with short legs and well-developed ambulacra that act as a hold-fast organ. Being of the order Astigmata, they have biting mouhtparts with a very small gnathosoma compared to body size.

== Transmission ==
Morphological constraints suggest that adult mites are nearly immobile. Transmission of mites has been shown to occur largely between direct interactions between parents and offspring and possibly during gregarious interactions between flock individuals. Observations of restricted species contamination on Falconiformes have supported this observation. Birds of prey have the greatest chance of cross contamination through interactions with their prey and yet have very stable acarofauna groups are found exclusively on those species. The European cuckoo, a brood parasite, has also been found to have their own species of mite even though the parents and offspring never interact (but see Lindholm et al., 1998)

== Selected genera ==
Proctophyllodinae

- Allodectes Gaud & Berla, 1963 – tentatively placed here
- Anisophyllodes Atyeo, 1967
- Bradyphyllodes Atyeo and Gaud, 1970
- Diproctophyllodes Atyeo and Gaud, 1968
- Favettea Trouessart, 1915
- Hemipterodectes Berla, 1959
- Joubertophyllodes Atyeo & Gaud, 1971
- Monojoubertia Radford, 1950
- Nycteridocaulus Atyeo, 1966
- Philepittalges Atyeo, 1966
- Proctophyllodes Robin, 1868
- Ptyctophyllodes Atyeo, 1967
- Tanyphyllodes Atyeo, 1966

Pterodectinae

- Afroproterothrix Mironov & Wauthy, 2010
- Amerodectes Valim & Hernandes, 2010
- Anisodiscus Gaud & Mouchet, 1957
- Dolichodectes
- Megalodectes
- Montesauria Oudemans, 1905
- Neodectes
- Pedanodectes
- Proterothrix Gaud, 1968
- Pterodectes Robin, 1877 – possibly not monophyletic
- Syntomodectes
- Toxerodectes
- Trochilodectes
- Xynonodectes
