= Analgoidea =

Scientific classification
- Domain: Eukaryota
- Kingdom: Animalia
- Phylum: Arthropoda
- Subphylum: Chelicerata
- Class: Arachnida
- Order: Sarcoptiformes
- Parvorder: Psoroptidia
- Superfamily: Analgoidea; Trouessart & Mégnin, 1884

Superfamily of mites

The Analgoidea are a superfamily of the Acarina (mite) order Sarcoptiformes. They contain many feather mites, being ectoparasites of birds and occasionally mammals.

== Families ==
- Alloptidae Gaud, 1957
- Analgidae Trouessart & Mégnin, 1884
- Apionacaridae Gaud & Atyeo, 1977
- Avenzoariidae Oudemans, 1905
- Cytoditidae Oudemans, 1908
- Dermationidae Fain, 1965
- Dermoglyphidae Mégnin & Trouessart, 1884
- Epidermoptidae Trouessart, 1892
- Heteropsoridae Oudemans, 1908
- Laminosioptidae Vitzthum, 1931
- Proctophyllodidae Mégnin & Trouessart, 1884
- Psoroptoididae Gaud, 1983
- Pteronyssidae Oudemans, 1941
- Thysanocercidae Atyeo & Peterson, 1972
- Trouessartiidae Gaud, 1957
- Xolalgidae Dubinin, 1953
