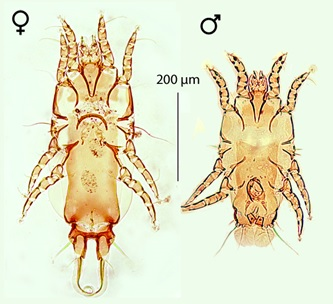
- Female and male Proctophyllodes polyxenus

Scientific classification
- Kingdom: Animalia
- Phylum: Arthropoda
- Subphylum: Chelicerata
- Class: Arachnida
- Order: Sarcoptiformes
- Family: Proctophyllodidae
- Genus: Proctophyllodes; Robin, 1868

= Proctophyllodes =

Genus of mites

Proctophyllodes is a genus of feather mites, found on passerine birds.
