= Licneremaeoidea =

Licneremaeoidea Temporal range: Jurassic–present

Scientific classification
- Domain: Eukaryota
- Kingdom: Animalia
- Phylum: Arthropoda
- Subphylum: Chelicerata
- Class: Arachnida
- Order: Oribatida
- Suborder: Brachypylina
- Superfamily: Licneremaeoidea; Grandjean, 1931

Superfamily of mites

Licneremaeoidea is a superfamily of mites in the order Oribatida. There are about 6 families and more than 170 described species in Licneremaeoidea.

== Families ==
These six families belong to the superfamily Licneremaeoidea:

- Dendroeremaeidae Behan-Pelletier, Eamer & Clayton, 2005
- Lamellareidae Balogh, 1972
- Licneremaeidae Grandjean, 1931
- Micreremidae Grandjean, 1954
- Passalozetidae Grandjean, 1954
- Scutoverticidae Grandjean, 1954
