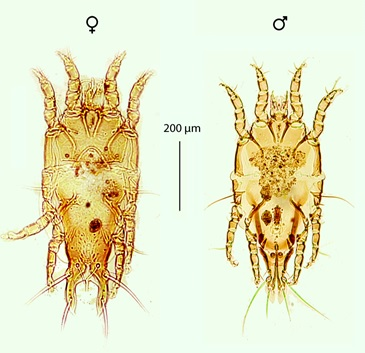
- Female and male Trouessartia capens

Scientific classification
- Kingdom: Animalia
- Phylum: Arthropoda
- Subphylum: Chelicerata
- Class: Arachnida
- Superorder: Acariformes
- Order: Sarcoptiformes; Reuter, 1909

Suborders
- Astigmata; Endeostigmata; Oribatida (beetle mites)

= Sarcoptiformes =

Order of mites

The Sarcoptiformes are an order of mites comprising over 16,000 described species in around 230 families. Previously it was divided into two suborders, Oribatida and Astigmatina, but Oribatida has been promoted to an order, and Astigmatina is now an unranked taxon.

== Families ==
Families:

1. Acaridae
2. Acaronychidae
3. Achipteriidae
4. Adelphacaridae
5. Adhaesozetidae
6. Aeroglyphidae
7. Aleurodamaeidae
8. Algophagidae
9. Alicorhagiidae
10. Alloptidae
11. Alycidae
12. Ameridae
13. Amerobelbidae
14. Ameronothridae
15. Ametroproctidae
16. Analgidae
17. Apionacaridae
18. Arborichthoniidae
19. Arceremaeidae
20. Aribatidae
21. Ascouracaridae
22. Astegistidae
23. Atopochthoniidae
24. Atopomelidae
25. Autognetidae
26. Avenzoariidae
27. Basilobelbidae
28. Belboidae
29. Brachychthoniidae
30. Caleremaeidae
31. Caloppiidae
32. Canestriniidae
33. Canestriniidae
34. Carabodidae
35. Carpoglyphidae
36. Caudiferidae
37. Ceratokalummidae
38. Ceratoppiidae
39. Ceratozetidae
40. Cerocepheidae
41. Chaetodactylidae
42. Chamobatidae
43. Charassobatidae
44. Chetochelacaridae
45. Cheylabididae
46. Chirodiscidae
47. Chirorhynchobiidae
48. Chortoglyphidae
49. Collohmanniidae
50. Cosmochthoniidae
51. Crotoniidae
52. Crypturoptidae
53. Ctenacaridae
54. Ctenobelbidae
55. Cuneoppiidae
56. Cymbaeremaeidae
57. Cytoditidae
58. Damaeidae
59. Damaeolidae
60. Dameolidae
61. Dampfiellidae
62. Decoroppiidae
63. Dendroeremaeidae
64. Dermationidae
65. Dermoglyphidae
66. Drymobatidae
67. Echimyopodidae
68. Elliptochthoniidae
69. Eniochthoniidae
70. Epactozetidae
71. Epidermoptidae
72. Epilohamanniidae
73. Epilohmanniidae
74. Epimerellidae
75. Eremaeidae
76. Eremaeozetidae
77. Eremellidae
78. Eremobelbidae
79. Eremulidae
80. Euglycyphagidae
81. Eulohmanniidae
82. Euphthiracaridae
83. Eustathiidae
84. Eutegaeidae
85. Falculiferidae
86. Fortuyniidae
87. Freyanidae
88. Gabuciniidae
89. Galumnellidae
90. Galumnidae
91. Gastronyssidae
92. Gaudiellidae
93. Gaudoglyphidae
94. Gehypochthoniidae
95. Genavensiidae
96. Glycacaridae
97. Glycyphagidae
98. Grandjeanicidae
99. Granuloppiidae
100. Guanolichidae
101. Gustaviidae
102. Gymnodamaeidae
103. Haplochthoniidae
104. Haplozetidae
105. Hemileiidae
106. Hemisarcoptidae
107. Hermanniellidae
108. Hermanniidae
109. Heterobelbidae
110. Heterochthoniidae
111. Heterocoptidae
112. Histiostomatidae
113. Humerobatidae
114. Hungarobelbidae
115. Hyadesiidae
116. Hydrozetidae
117. Hypochthoniidae
118. Hypoderatidae
119. Kiwilichidae
120. Knemidokoptidae
121. Kodiakellidae
122. Kramerellidae
123. Lamellareidae
124. Laminosioptidae
125. Lardoglyphidae
126. Lemanniellidae
127. Lemurnyssidae
128. Liacaridae
129. Licneremaeidae
130. Licnobelbidae
131. Licnodamaeidae
132. Liebstadiidae
133. Limnozetidae
134. Linobiidae
135. Listrophoridae
136. Lobalgidae
137. Lohmanniidae
138. Lyroppiidae
139. Machadobelbidae
140. Machuellidae
141. Mahuellidae
142. Malaconothridae
143. Maudheimiidae
144. Meliponocoptidae
145. Mesoplophoridae
146. Micreremidae
147. Micropsammidae
148. Microtegeidae
149. Microzetidae
150. Mochlozetidae
151. Mucronothridae
152. Multoribulidae
153. Myocoptidae
154. Nanhermanniidae
155. Nanhermanniidea
156. Nanohystricidae
157. Nanorchestidae
158. Nehypochthoniidae
159. Nematalycidae
160. Neoliodidae
161. Nesozetidae
162. Niphocepheidae
163. Nippobodidae
164. Nodocepheidae
165. Nosybeidae
166. Nothridae
167. Ochrolichidae
168. Oconnoriidae
169. Oehserchestidae
170. Oppidae
171. Oppiidae
172. Oribatellidae
173. Oribatulidae
174. Oribellidae
175. Oribotritiidae
176. Oripodidae
177. Otocepheidae
178. Oxyameridae
179. Pachygnathidae
180. Palaeacaridae
181. Papillonotidae
182. Parakalummidae
183. Parakalumnidae
184. Parhypochthoniidae
185. Passalozetidae
186. Pedetopodidae
187. Pediculochelidae
188. Peloppiidae
189. Pelopsidae
190. Perlohmanniidae
191. Phenopelopidae
192. Pheroliodidae
193. Phthiracaridae
194. Pirnodidae
195. Plasmobatidae
196. Plateremaeidae
197. Platyameridae
198. Pneumocoptidae
199. Podacaridae
200. Podopterotegaeidae
201. Polypterozetidae
202. Proctophyllodidae
203. Proteonematalycidae
204. Proterorhagiidae
205. Prothoplophoridae
206. Protoplophoridae
207. Protoribatidae
208. Psammochthoniidae
209. Pseudoppiidae
210. Psoroptidae
211. Psoroptoididae
212. Pterolichidae
213. Pteronyssidae
214. Ptiloxenidae
215. Ptyssalgidae
216. Punctoribatidae
217. Pyroglyphidae
218. Quadroppiidae
219. Rectijanuidae
220. Rhynchoribatidae
221. Rhyncoptidae
222. Rioppiidae
223. Rosensteiniidae
224. Salvidae
225. Sarcoptidae
226. Scatoglyphidae
227. Scheloribatidae
228. Schizoglyphidae
229. Scutoverticidae
230. Selenoribatidae
231. Sphaerochthoniidae
232. Spinozetidae
233. Staurobatidae
234. Sternoppiidae
235. Suctobelbidae
236. Suidasiidae
237. Symbioribatidae
238. Synichotritiidae
239. Syringobiidae
240. Tectocepheidae
241. Tegeocranellidae
242. Tegoribatidae
243. Tenuialidae
244. Teratoppiidae
245. Terpnacaridae
246. Tetracondylidae
247. Thoracosathesidae
248. Thyrisomidae
249. Thysanocercidae
250. Tokunocepheidae
251. Trhypochthoniellidae
252. Trhypochthoniidae
253. Trichthoniidae
254. Trizetidae
255. Trouessartiidae
256. Tubulozetidae
257. Tumerozetidae
258. Tuparezetidae
259. Turbinoptidae
260. Unduloribatidae
261. Vexillariidae
262. Winterschmidtiidae
263. Xenillidae
264. Xolalgidae
265. Zetomotrichidae
266. Zetorchestidae
