= Hypoderidae =

Scientific classification
- Kingdom: Animalia
- Phylum: Arthropoda
- Subphylum: Chelicerata
- Class: Arachnida
- Order: Sarcoptiformes
- Suborder: Astigmata
- Family: Hypoderidae; Murray, 1877

Family of mites

Hypoderidae is a family of mites belonging to the order Astigmata.

Genera:

- Alcedinectes Fain, 1966
- Amazonectes Fain, 1967
- Apodidectes Mironov & OConnor, 2013
- Aradectes Fain, 1966
- Bubulcodectes Fain & Lukoschus, 1986
- Collocalidectes Mironov & OConnor, 2013
- Colobathryglyphus Fain & Nadchatram, 1982
- Dipodomydectes Fain & Lukoschus, 1978
- Gypsodectes Fain, 1984
- Hypodectes de Filippi, 1862
- Ibisidectes Fain & Laurence, 1974
- Muridectes Fain, 1968
- Neottialges Fain, 1966
- Neotytodectes OConnor, 1981
- Passerodectes Fain, 1966
- Phalacrodectes Fain, 1966
- Picidectes Fain, 1967
- Thalassornectes Fain, 1966
- Tytodectes Fain, 1966
