= Blomia =

Blomia may refer to:

- Blomia (mite), a genus of mites in the family Echimyopodidae
- Blomia (plant), a genus of flowering plants in the family Sapindaceae
