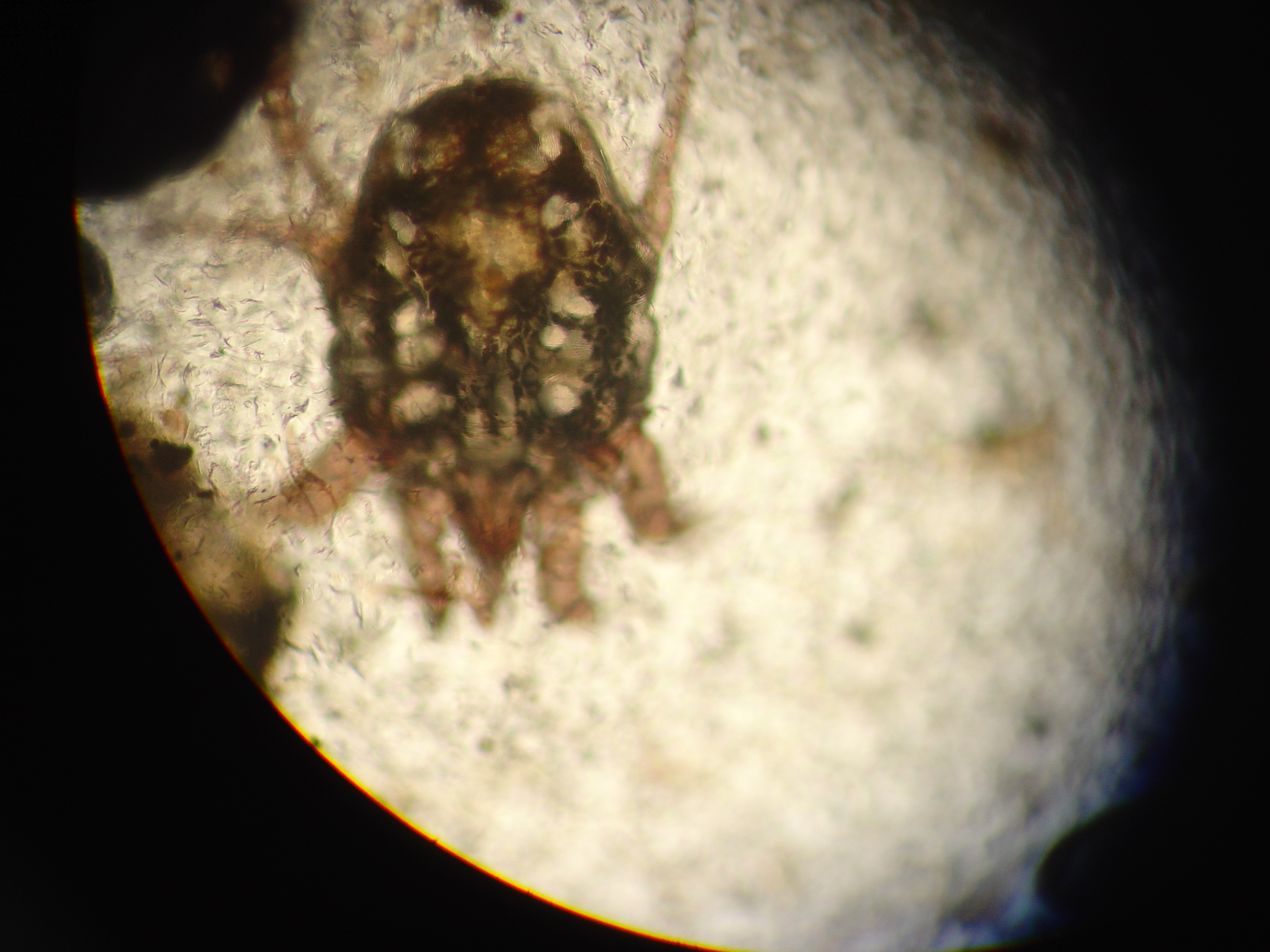
- Psoroptes cuniculi (Sarcoptoidea: Psoroptidae)

Scientific classification
- Domain: Eukaryota
- Kingdom: Animalia
- Phylum: Arthropoda
- Subphylum: Chelicerata
- Class: Arachnida
- Order: Sarcoptiformes
- Suborder: Astigmata
- Parvorder: Psoroptidia; Yunker, 1955

Superfamilies
- Analgoidea (feather mites); Pterolichoidea (feather mites); Sarcoptoidea; Psoroptidia incertae sedis; Heteropsoridae

= Psoroptidia =

Group of mites

Psoroptidia is a parvorder of the Acari (mite) group Astigma (or Astigmatina). It comprises around 40 families, and apparently originated as parasites of birds, before a secondary radiation saw some taxa become parasites of mammals. Because of their parasitic lifestyle, members of the Psoroptidia do not exhibit a deutonymph stage.

The group contains many of the more notorious parasitic members of the Astigmata. Three of the superfamilies in this clade are among those Acarina collectively called feather mites, whereas the fourth and fifth – Psoroptoidea and Pyroglyphoidea – contains ear mites and scabies mites among others.
