= Adelphacaridae =

Scientific classification
- Domain: Eukaryota
- Kingdom: Animalia
- Phylum: Arthropoda
- Subphylum: Chelicerata
- Class: Arachnida
- Order: Sarcoptiformes
- Family: Adelphacaridae

Synonyms
- Aphelacaridae

Family of mites

Adelphacaridae is a family of mites belonging to the order Sarcoptiformes.

Genera:

- Adelphacarus Grandjean, 1952
- Aphelacarus Grandjean, 1932
- Beklemisheria Zachvatkin, 1945
- Monoaphelacarus Subias & Arillo, 2002
