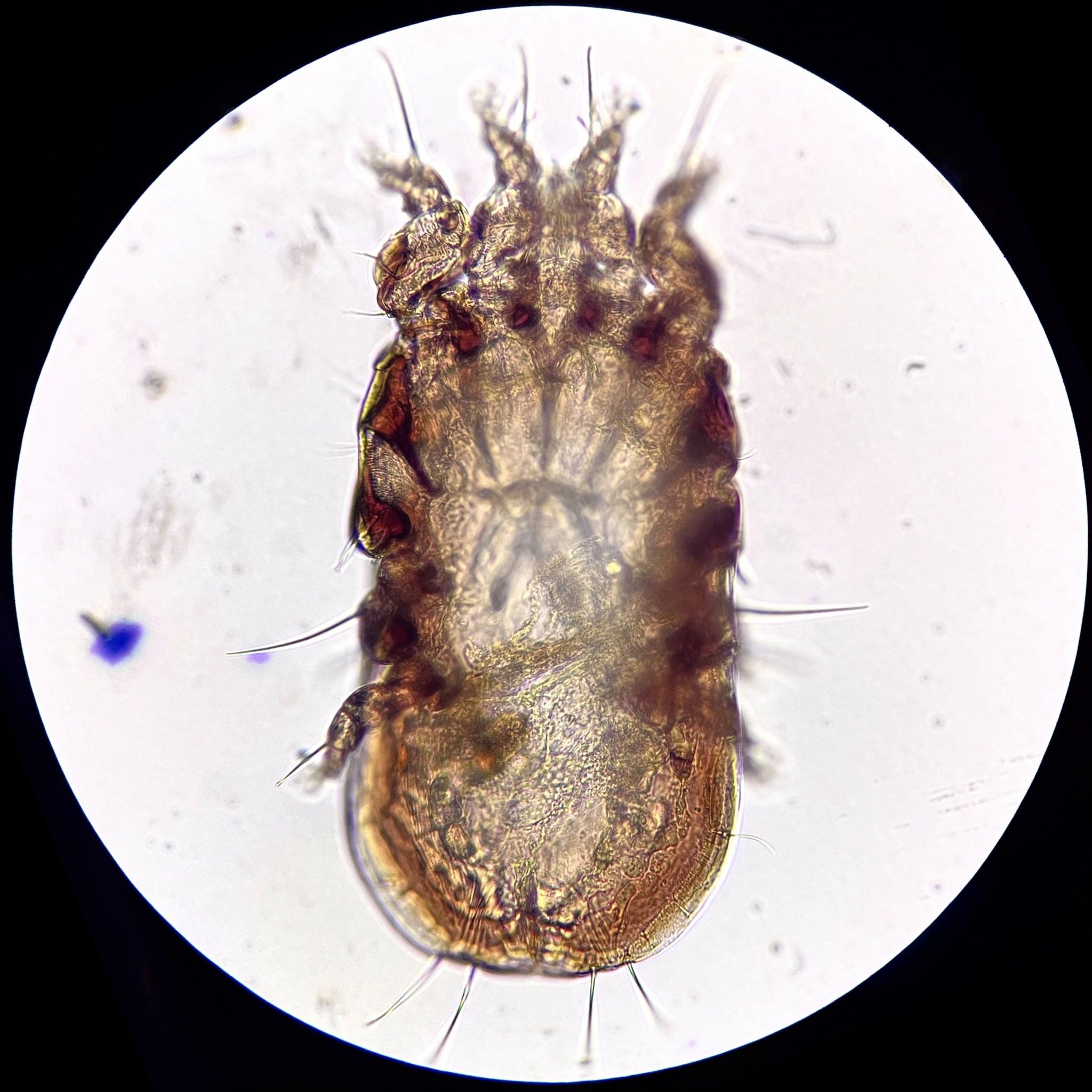
- Microspalax sp.

Scientific classification
- Kingdom: Animalia
- Phylum: Arthropoda
- Subphylum: Chelicerata
- Class: Arachnida
- Order: Sarcoptiformes
- Family: Syringobiidae; Trouessart, 1896

= Syringobiidae =

Family of mites

Syringobiidae is a family of mites belonging to the order Sarcoptiformes.

== Genera ==
The following genera are recognised in the family Syringobiidae:

- Anoplonotus Trouessart, 1916
- Dabertia Özdikmen, 2008
- Dabertina Koçak & Kemal, 2008
- Ehrnsbergeria Dabert, 2008
- Eurysyringobia Dabert, 1992
- Grenieria Gaud & Mouchet, 1959
- Kiwilichus Gaud & Atyeo, 1970
- Leptosyringobia Vasyukova & Mironov, 1991
- Limosilichus Vasyukova & Mironov, 1986
- Longepedia Dabert, 1992
- Megasyringobia Dabert, 1992
- Michaelicus
- Microspalax Mégnin & Trouessart, 1884
- Paidoplutarchusia Dabert, 2003
- Phyllochaeta Dubinin, 1951
- Plutarchusia Oudemans, 1904
- Raineria Dabert, 2003
- Sammonica Oudemans, 1904
- Samonica Oudemans, 1904
- Sikyonemus Gaud, 1966
- Syringobia Trouessart & Neumann, 1888
- Syringoplutarchusia Dabert & Skoracki, 2007
- Thecarthra Trouessart, 1896
- BOLD:AED9079 (Syringobiidae sp.)
