= Perlohmanniidae =

Scientific classification
- Domain: Eukaryota
- Kingdom: Animalia
- Phylum: Arthropoda
- Subphylum: Chelicerata
- Class: Arachnida
- Order: Sarcoptiformes
- Family: Perlohmanniidae

Synonyms
- Perlohmaniidae

Family of mites

Perlohmanniidae is a family of mites belonging to the order Sarcoptiformes.

Genera:

- Hololohmannia Kubota & Aoki, 1998
- Perlohmannia Berlese, 1916
