= Nanhermanniidae =

- Nanhermannia coronata

Scientific classification
- Kingdom: Animalia
- Phylum: Arthropoda
- Subphylum: Chelicerata
- Class: Arachnida
- Order: Sarcoptiformes
- Family: Nanhermanniidae; Sellnick, 1928

Family of mites

Nanhermanniidae is a family of mites in the order Sarcoptiformes.

Genera:

- Bicyrthermannia Hammer, 1979
- Cosmohermannia Aoki & Yoshida, 1970
- Cyrthermannia Balogh, 1958
- Dendrohermannia Balogh, 1985
- Masthermannia Berlese, 1913
- Nanhermannia Berlese, 1913
- Notohermannia Balogh, 1985
