= Lophonotacarus =

Scientific classification
- Kingdom: Animalia
- Phylum: Arthropoda
- Subphylum: Chelicerata
- Class: Arachnida
- Order: Sarcoptiformes
- Family: Lophonotacaridae; Fain, 1987
- Genus: Lophonotacarus; Fain, 1987
- Species: L. minutus

Binomial name
- Lophonotacarus minutus Fain, 1987

Genus of mites

Lophonotacarus is a monotypic genus of mites belonging to the monotypic family Lophonotacaridae. The only species is Lophonotacarus minutus.
