= Schizoglyphus =

Scientific classification
- Kingdom: Animalia
- Phylum: Arthropoda
- Subphylum: Chelicerata
- Class: Arachnida
- Order: Sarcoptiformes
- Suborder: Astigmata
- Family: Schizoglyphidae; Mahunka, 1978
- Genus: Schizoglyphus; Mahunka, 1978
- Species: S. biroi

Binomial name
- Schizoglyphus biroi Mahunka, 1978

Genus of mites

Schizoglyphus is a monotypic genus of mites belonging to the monotypic family Schizoglyphidae. The only species is Schizoglyphus biroi.
