= Alicorhagiidae =

Scientific classification
- Kingdom: Animalia
- Phylum: Arthropoda
- Subphylum: Chelicerata
- Class: Arachnida
- Order: Sarcoptiformes
- Family: Alicorhagiidae; Grandjean, 1939

Family of mites

Alicorhagiidae is a family of mites belonging to the order Sarcoptiformes.

Genera:

- Alicorhagia Berlese, 1910
- Alicorhagia Grandjean, 1939
- Archaeacarus Kethley & Norton, 1989
- Epistomalycus Thor, 1931
- Stigmalychus Théron, Meyer & Ryke, 1970
