= Malaconothridae =

- Tyrphonothrus sp.

Scientific classification
- Kingdom: Animalia
- Phylum: Arthropoda
- Subphylum: Chelicerata
- Class: Arachnida
- Order: Sarcoptiformes
- Family: Malaconothridae; Berlese, 1916

Family of mites

Malaconothridae is a family of mites in the order Sarcoptiformes.

Genera:

- Elapheremaeus Grandjean, 1943
- Fossonothrus Hammer, 1962
- Malaconothrus Berlese, 1904
- Tyrphonothrus Knülle, 1957
- Zeanothrus Hammer, 1966
