= Trhypochthoniidae =

Scientific classification
- Kingdom: Animalia
- Phylum: Arthropoda
- Subphylum: Chelicerata
- Class: Arachnida
- Order: Sarcoptiformes
- Family: Trhypochthoniidae

Family of arachnids

Trhypochthoniidae is a family of mites belonging to the order Sarcoptiformes.

== Genera ==
Genera:

- Afronothrus Wallwork, 1961
- Albonothrus Tseng, 1982
- Allonothrus Hammen, 1953
