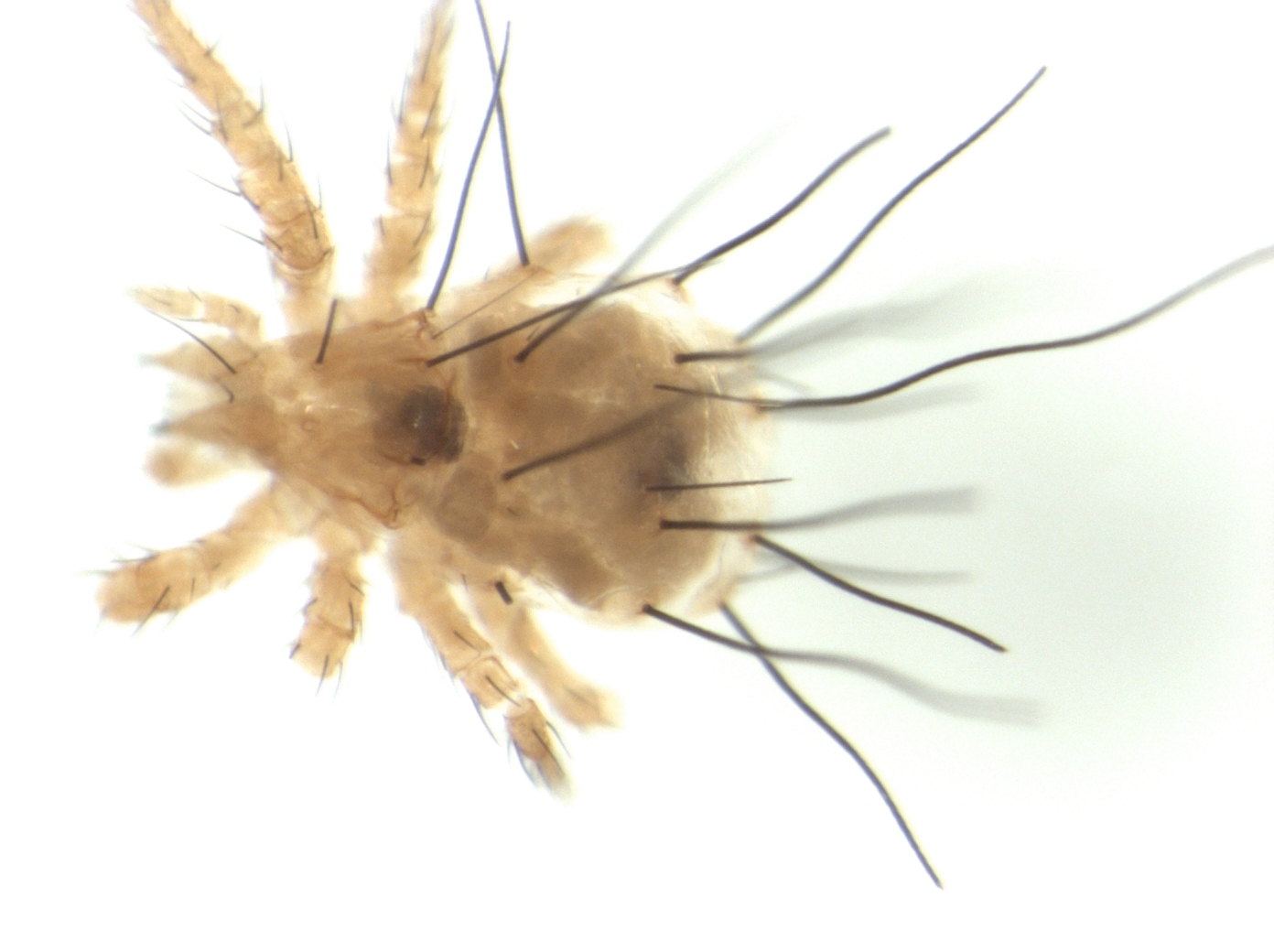
- Stomacarus sp.

Scientific classification
- Domain: Eukaryota
- Kingdom: Animalia
- Phylum: Arthropoda
- Subphylum: Chelicerata
- Class: Arachnida
- Order: Sarcoptiformes
- Family: Acaronychidae

Synonyms
- Archeonothridae

= Acaronychidae =

Family of mites

Acaronychidae is a family of mites belonging to the order Sarcoptiformes.

Genera:

- Acaronychus Grandjean, 1932
- Archeonothrus Trägårdh, 1906
- Loftacarus Lee, 1981
- Stomacarus Grandjean, 1952
- Zachvatkinella Lange, 1954
