= Ptyssalges =

Scientific classification
- Kingdom: Animalia
- Phylum: Arthropoda
- Subphylum: Chelicerata
- Class: Arachnida
- Order: Sarcoptiformes
- Suborder: Astigmata
- Family: Ptyssalgidae; Atyeo & Gaud, 1979
- Genus: Ptyssalges; Atyeo & Gaud, 1979
- Species: P. major

Binomial name
- Ptyssalges major (Trouessart, 1887)

Genus of mites

Ptyssalges is a monotypic genus of mites belonging to the monotypic family Ptyssalgidae. The only species is Ptyssalges major.

The species is found in Central America.
