= Limnozetidae =

Scientific classification
- Domain: Eukaryota
- Kingdom: Animalia
- Phylum: Arthropoda
- Subphylum: Chelicerata
- Class: Arachnida
- Order: Sarcoptiformes
- Genus: Limnozetidae

Family of mites

Limnozetidae is a family of mites belonging to the order Sarcoptiformes.

Genera:

- Antarcticola Wallwork, 1967
- Limnozetella Willmann, 1932
- Limnozetes Hull, 1916
