= Ctenobelbidae =

Scientific classification
- Domain: Eukaryota
- Kingdom: Animalia
- Phylum: Arthropoda
- Subphylum: Chelicerata
- Class: Arachnida
- Order: Sarcoptiformes
- Genus: Ctenobelbidae

Family of mites

Ctenobelbidae is a family of mites belonging to the order Sarcoptiformes.

Genera:

- Ctenobelba Balogh, 1943
