= Protoribatidae =

Scientific classification
- Domain: Eukaryota
- Kingdom: Animalia
- Phylum: Arthropoda
- Subphylum: Chelicerata
- Class: Arachnida
- Order: Sarcoptiformes
- Family: Protoribatidae

Family of mites

Protoribatidae is a family of mites belonging to the order Sarcoptiformes.

Genera:

- Cribrozetes Balogh, 1970
- Perxylobates Hammer, 1972
- Polillozetes Corpuz-Raros, 2009
- Protoribates Berlese, 1908
- Setoxylobates Balogh & Mahunka, 1967
- Sicaxylobates Luxton, 1985
- Transoribates Pérez-Íñigo, 1992
- Trixylobates Balogh & Mahunka, 1978
- Tuxenia Hammer, 1958
- Vilhenabates Balogh, 1963
