= Echimyopodidae =

Scientific classification
- Kingdom: Animalia
- Phylum: Arthropoda
- Subphylum: Chelicerata
- Class: Arachnida
- Order: Sarcoptiformes
- Suborder: Astigmata
- Family: Echimyopodidae

Family of mites

Echimyopodidae is a family of mites in the order Astigmata. There are at least two genera and two described species in Echimyopodidae.

== Genera ==
- Blomia
- Marsupiopus
