= Chetochelacarus =

Scientific classification
- Kingdom: Animalia
- Phylum: Arthropoda
- Subphylum: Chelicerata
- Class: Arachnida
- Order: Sarcoptiformes
- Family: Chetochelacaridae; Fain, 1987
- Genus: Chetochelacarus; Fain, 1987
- Species: C. mamillatus

Binomial name
- Chetochelacarus mamillatus Fain, 1987

Genus of mites

Chetochelacarus is a monotypic genus of mites belonging to the monotypic family Chetochelacaridae. The only species is Chetochelacarus mamillatus.
