= Xenillidae =

Scientific classification
- Domain: Eukaryota
- Kingdom: Animalia
- Phylum: Arthropoda
- Subphylum: Chelicerata
- Class: Arachnida
- Order: Sarcoptiformes
- Family: Xenillidae

Family of mites

Xenillidae is a family of mites belonging to the order Sarcoptiformes.

Genera:

- Choixenillus Subías, 2016
- Neoxenillus Fujikawa, 2004
- Stenoxenillus Woolley & Higgins, 1966
- Stonyxenillus Woolley & Higgins, 1966
- Xenilloides Pérez-Íñigo & Baggio, 1989
- Xenillus Robineau-Desvoidy, 1839
