= Tectocepheidae =

- Tectocepheus velatus

Scientific classification
- Kingdom: Animalia
- Phylum: Arthropoda
- Subphylum: Chelicerata
- Class: Arachnida
- Order: Sarcoptiformes
- Family: Tectocepheidae; Grandjean, 1954

Family of mites

Tectocepheidae is a family of mites belonging to the order Sarcoptiformes.

Genera:

- Tectocephalus Berlese, 1895
- Tectocepheus Berlese, 1896
- Tegeozetes Berlese, 1913
