= Thyrisomidae =

Scientific classification
- Kingdom: Animalia
- Phylum: Arthropoda
- Subphylum: Chelicerata
- Class: Arachnida
- Order: Sarcoptiformes
- Family: Thyrisomidae

Family of mites

Thyrisomidae is a family of mites belonging to the order Sarcoptiformes.

Genera:

- Banksinoma Oudemans, 1930
- Gemmazetes Fujikawa, 1979
- Gobiella Balogh & Mahunka, 1965
