= Peloppiidae =

Scientific classification
- Domain: Eukaryota
- Kingdom: Animalia
- Phylum: Arthropoda
- Subphylum: Chelicerata
- Class: Arachnida
- Order: Sarcoptiformes
- Family: Peloppiidae

Synonyms
- Metrioppiidae

Family of mites

Peloppiidae is a family of mites belonging to the order Sarcoptiformes.

Genera:

- Ceratoppiella Hammer, 1977
- Metrioppia Grandjean, 1931
- Paenoppia Woolley & Higgins, 1965
