= Aleurodamaeidae =

Scientific classification
- Domain: Eukaryota
- Kingdom: Animalia
- Phylum: Arthropoda
- Subphylum: Chelicerata
- Class: Arachnida
- Order: Sarcoptiformes
- Family: Aleurodamaeidae

Family of mites

Aleurodamaeidae is a family of mites belonging to the order Sarcoptiformes.

Genera:

- Aleurodamaeus Grandjean, 1954
- Austrodamaeus Balogh & Mahunka, 1981
