= Kiwilichus =

Scientific classification
- Kingdom: Animalia
- Phylum: Arthropoda
- Subphylum: Chelicerata
- Class: Arachnida
- Order: Sarcoptiformes
- Family: Kiwilichidae
- Genus: Kiwilichus; Gaud & Atyeo, 1970

Genus of mites

Kiwilichus is a genus of feather mites in Kiwilichidae, a monotypic family of mites that is endemic to New Zealand. Kiwi (Apteryx) are the host birds of the two species. Kiwilichus cryptosikyus is known to be hosted by southern brown kiwi (Apteryx australis) and great spotted kiwi (Apteryx haastii), and Kiwilichus delosikyus by southern brown kiwi.

Species:

- Kiwilichus cryptosikyus Gaud & Atyeo, 1970
- Kiwilichus delosikyus Gaud & Atyeo, 1970
