= Adhaesozetidae =

Scientific classification
- Kingdom: Animalia
- Phylum: Arthropoda
- Subphylum: Chelicerata
- Class: Arachnida
- Order: Sarcoptiformes
- Family: Adhaesozetidae; Hammer, 1973

Family of mites

Adhaesozetidae is a family of mites belonging to the order Sarcoptiformes.

Genera:

- Adhaesozetes Hammer, 1966
- Bunabodes Fujikawa, 2004
