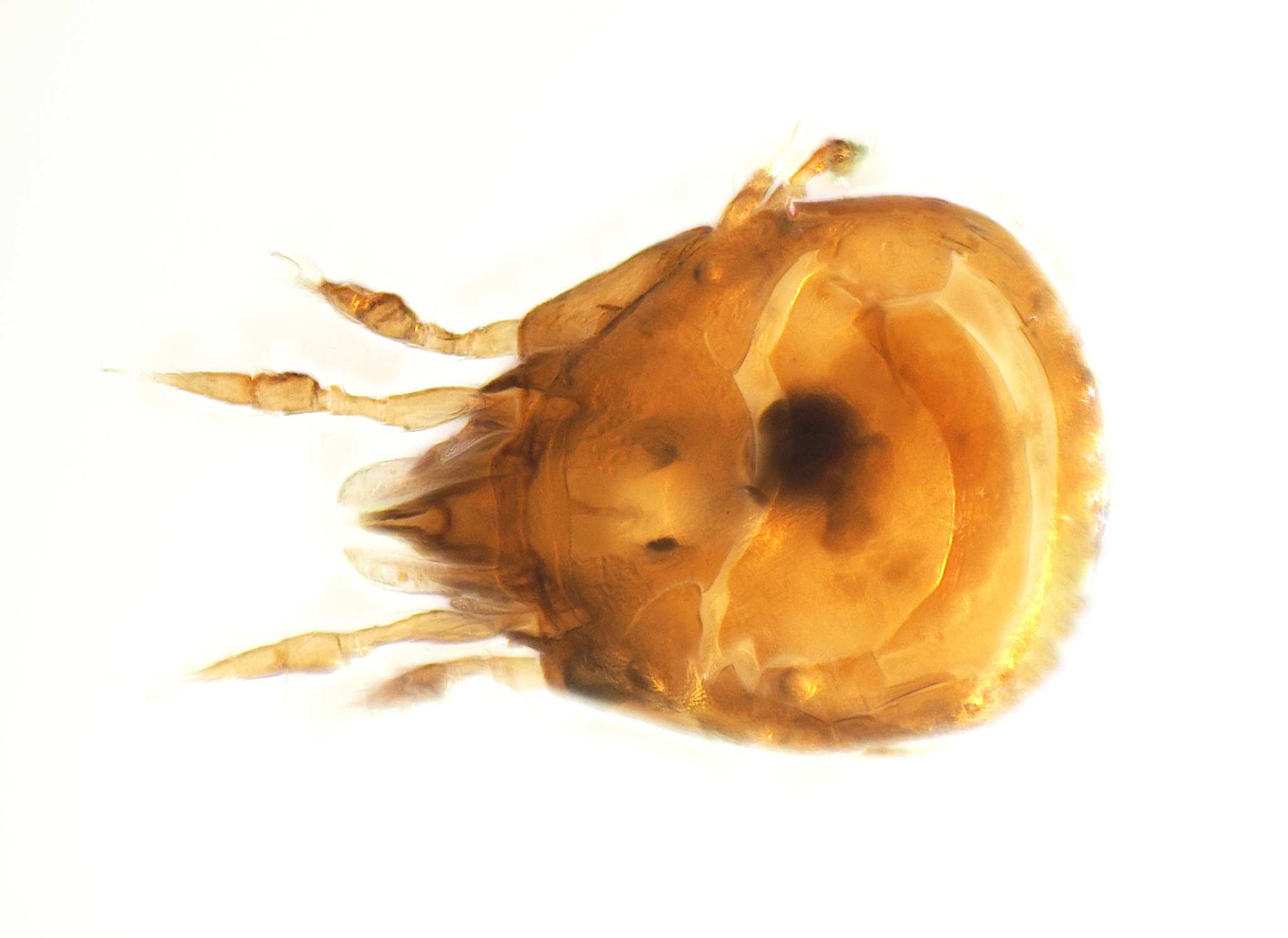
- Nesopelops sp.

Scientific classification
- Kingdom: Animalia
- Phylum: Arthropoda
- Subphylum: Chelicerata
- Class: Arachnida
- Order: Oribatida
- Superfamily: Phenopelopoidea
- Family: Phenopelopidae; Petrunkevitch, 1955

= Phenopelopidae =

Phenopelopidae Temporal range: Palaeogene–present

Family of mites

Phenopelopidae is a family of oribatid mites in the order Sarcoptiformes. As of 2018, there were 4 genera and 106 species known in this family.

== Description ==
Adult mites of this family are 400-900 μm long and usually dark brown to almost black in colour, but light brown individuals also occur. They can be distinguished from other oribatid families by: flat and blade-like lamellae (ridges of cuticle between the dorsal trichobothria); elongate pelopsiform or normally developed chelicerae with small chelae; notogaster with a broad anterior tectum, overhanging insertions of interlamellar setae and bothridia; with movable pteromorphs and well- or poorly-circumscribed lenticulus; porose areas small or rarely with saccules, all closely associated with some of the notogastral setae; with eight or 10 pairs of notogastral setae; and custodium broad.

The juvenile stages (larvae and nymphs) differ from adults in being smaller, soft-bodied, light brown and having plicate (folded or crumpled) cuticle. However, juveniles have only been studied for a few species of Phenopelopidae.

These mites are covered in numerous setae, which vary among species and among life stages within species. A typical feature of Phenopelopidae is the presence of long, thick setae on some leg segments. Juveniles of some species have long marginal setae, possibly as protection against small predators.

== Ecology ==
Phenopelopidae have been collected from leaf litter underneath trees, moss, a forest meadow, at the edge of a bog, grass and woodland. They appear to be fungal feeders, but at least one species can feed on living plant material.

== Genera ==
Below is a list of the genera in this family, along with their authorities, years of publication and distributions.

- Eupelops Ewing, 1917 - cosmopolitan
- Nesopelops Hammer, 1973 - Oceanic, Oriental
- Peloptulus Berlese, 1908 - Holarctic, Neotropical, Oriental
- Propelops Jacot, 1937 - Holarctic
