= Humerobatidae =

Scientific classification
- Domain: Eukaryota
- Kingdom: Animalia
- Phylum: Arthropoda
- Subphylum: Chelicerata
- Class: Arachnida
- Order: Sarcoptiformes
- Genus: Humerobatidae

Family of arachnids

Humerobatidae is a family of mites belonging to the order Sarcoptiformes.

Genera:

- Africoribates Evans, 1953
- Afroleius Mahunka, 1984
- Anellozetes Hammer, 1962
- Antarctozetes Balogh, 1961
- Diapterobates Grandjean, 1936
- Humerobates Sellnick, 1928
- Nuhivabates Niemi & Behan-Pelletier, 2004
- Ramsayellus Spain & Luxton, 1970
- Svalbardia Thor, 1930
