= Caleremaeidae =

Scientific classification
- Domain: Eukaryota
- Kingdom: Animalia
- Phylum: Arthropoda
- Subphylum: Chelicerata
- Class: Arachnida
- Order: Sarcoptiformes
- Family: Caleremaeidae

Family of mites

Caleremaeidae is a family of mites belonging to the order Sarcoptiformes.

Genera:

- Anderemaeus Hammer, 1958
- Caleremaeus Berlese, 1910
- Caucaseremaeus Subías & Shtanchaeva, 2006
- Cristeremaeus Balogh & Csiszár, 1963
- Epieremulus Berlese, 1916
- Luxtoneremaeus Balogh, 1992
- Megeremaeus Higgins & Woolley, 1965
- Veloppia Hammer, 1955
- Yungaseremaeus Balogh & Mahunka, 1969
