= Eremaeidae =

- Eremaeus occidentalis

Scientific classification
- Kingdom: Animalia
- Phylum: Arthropoda
- Subphylum: Chelicerata
- Class: Arachnida
- Order: Sarcoptiformes
- Family: Eremaeidae; Kramer, 1877

Family of mites

Eremaeidae is a family of mites belonging to the order Sarcoptiformes.

Genera:

- Asperemaeus Behan-Pelletier, 1982
- Carinabella Hammer, 1977
- Eremaeus Koch, 1835
- Eueremaeus Mihelcic, 1963
- Rhynchobella Hammer, 1961
- Tricheremaeus Berlese, 1908
- Tuvermaeus Sellnick, 1930
