= Guanolichidae =

Scientific classification
- Kingdom: Animalia
- Phylum: Arthropoda
- Subphylum: Chelicerata
- Class: Arachnida
- Order: Sarcoptiformes
- Family: Guanolichidae

Family of mites

Guanolichidae is a family of mites belonging to the order Sarcoptiformes.

Genera:

- Guanolichoides Fain, 1979
- Guanolichus Fain, 1968
- Neoguanolichus Fain, 1979
