= Hyadesiidae =

Scientific classification
- Kingdom: Animalia
- Phylum: Arthropoda
- Subphylum: Chelicerata
- Class: Arachnida
- Order: Sarcoptiformes
- Family: Hyadesiidae

Family of mites

Hyadesiidae is a family of mites belonging to the order Sarcoptiformes.

Genera:

- Alophagus Hughes, 1955
- Amhyadesia Fain & Ganning, 1979
- Hyadesia Megnin, 1889
