= Oribatellidae =

Scientific classification
- Domain: Eukaryota
- Kingdom: Animalia
- Phylum: Arthropoda
- Subphylum: Chelicerata
- Class: Arachnida
- Order: Sarcoptiformes
- Genus: Oribatellidae

Family of arachnids

Oribatellidae is a family of mites belonging to the order Sarcoptiformes.

== Genera ==
Genera:

- Berniniella Özdikmen, 2008
- Cavernella Bernini, 1975
- Cuspidozetes Hammer, 1962
- Fberninia Özdikmen, 2008
- Fenestrobates Balogh & Mahunka, 1969
- Ferolocella Grabowski, 1971
- Gendzella Kuliev, 1977
- Joelia Oudemans, 1906
- Kunstella Krivolutsky, 1974
- Lamellobates Hammer, 1958
- Novoribatella Engelbrecht, 1986
- Ophidiotrichus Grandjean, 1953
- Oribatella Banks, 1895
- Palmitalia Pérez-Íñigo & Peña, 1997
- Prionoribatella Aoki, 1975
- Safrobates Mahunka, 1989
- Sagittazetes Balogh, 1983
- Siciliotrichus Bernini, 1973
