= Algophagidae =

Scientific classification
- Kingdom: Animalia
- Phylum: Arthropoda
- Subphylum: Chelicerata
- Class: Arachnida
- Order: Oribatida
- Superfamily: Hemisarcoptoidea
- Family: Algophagidae

Family of mites

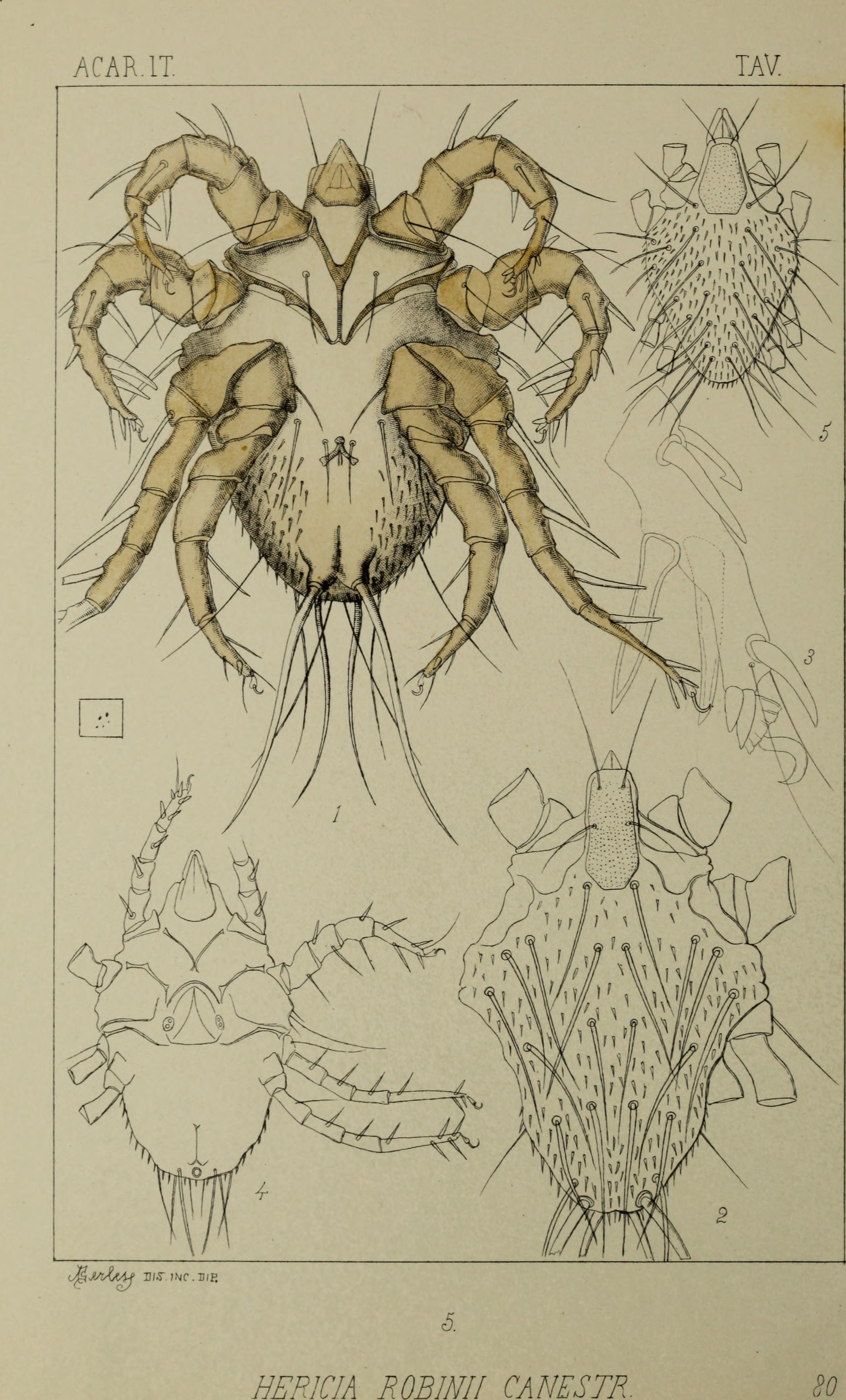

Algophagidae is a family of mites in the order Astigmata. There are about 5 genera and at least 10 described species in Algophagidae.

== Genera ==
These five genera belong to the family Algophagidae:

- Algophagus Hughes, 1955
- Fusohericia Vitzthum, 1931
- Hericia Canestrini, 1888
- Neohyadesia Hughes & Goodman, 1969
- Terraphagus Clark, 2012
