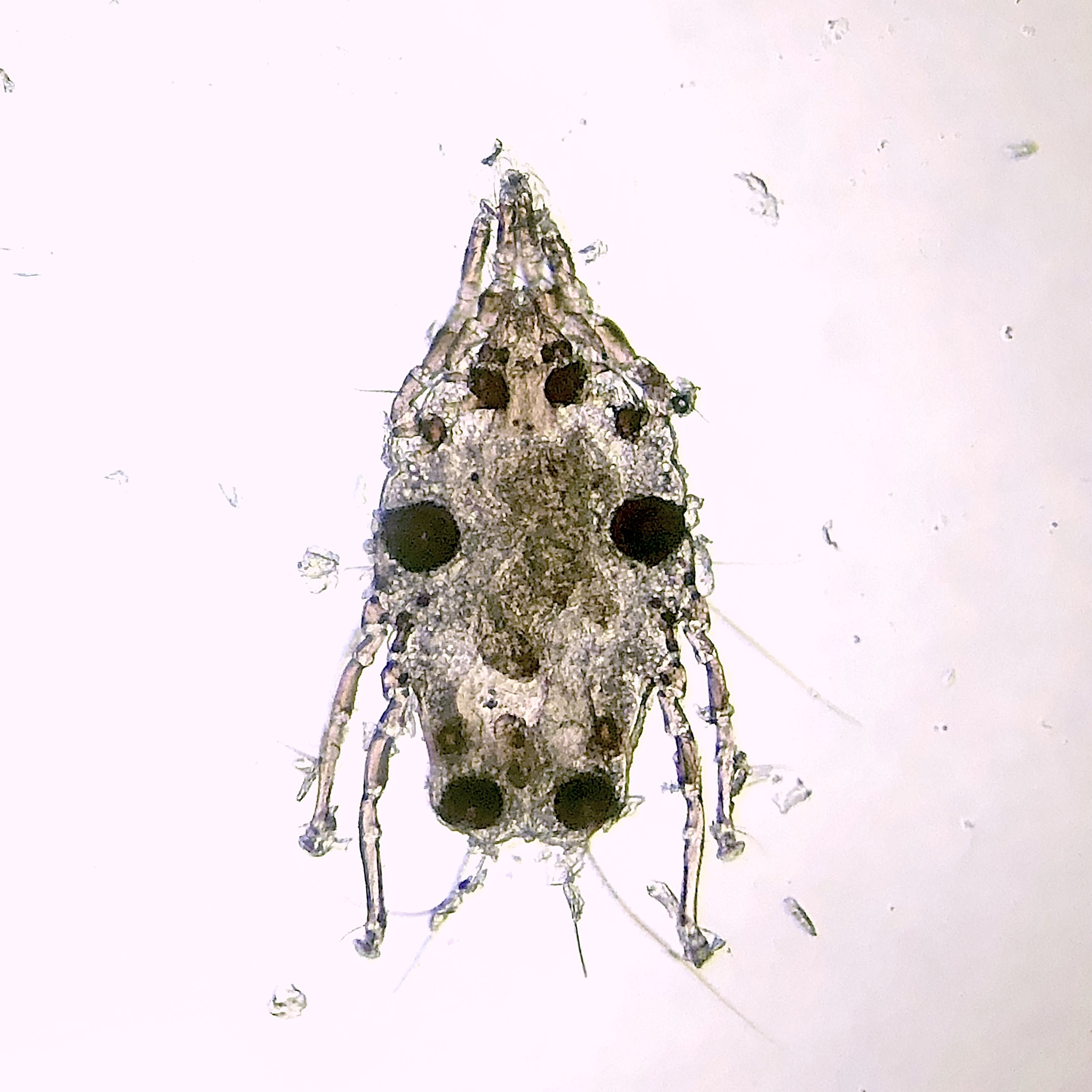
- Psittophagus galahi

Scientific classification
- Kingdom: Animalia
- Phylum: Arthropoda
- Subphylum: Chelicerata
- Class: Arachnida
- Order: Sarcoptiformes
- Family: Falculiferidae; Oudemans, 1905

= Falculiferidae =

Family of mites

Falculiferidae is a family of mites belonging to the order Sarcoptiformes.

== Taxonomy ==
The following genera are recognised in the family Falculiferidae:

- Afrophagus Gaud, 1976
- Atyeonia Gaud, 1966
- Byersalges Atyeo & Winchell, 1984
- Cheiloceras Trouessart, 1898
- Cheiloceratoides Mironov & Hallan, 2012
- Duculacarus Perez & Atyeo, 1981
- Falculifer Railliet, 1896
- Hemiphagacarus Atyeo, 1976
- Hexoplostomus Gaud, 1976
- Hyperaspidacarus Atyeo & Smith, 1984
- Nanolichus Gaud & Mouchet, 1959
- Psittophagus Gaud & Atyeo, 1996
- Pterophagoides Gaud & Mouchet, 1959
- Pterophagus Gaud & Mouchet, 1959
- Pterophagus Mégnin, 1877
- Rhipiurus Gaud & Mouchet, 1959
- Spilolichus Gaud & Mouchet, 1959
