= Autognetidae =

Scientific classification
- Domain: Eukaryota
- Kingdom: Animalia
- Phylum: Arthropoda
- Subphylum: Chelicerata
- Class: Arachnida
- Order: Sarcoptiformes
- Family: Autognetidae

Family of mites

Autognetidae is a family of mites belonging to the order Sarcoptiformes.

Genera:

- Austrogneta Balogh & Csiszár, 1963
- Autogneta Hull, 1916
- Conchogneta Grandjean, 1963
- Cosmogneta Grandjean, 1960
- Eremobodes Jacot, 1937
- Parautogneta Golosova, 1974
- Raphigneta Grandjean, 1960
- Rhaphigneta Grandjean, 1960
- Triautogneta Fujikawa, 2009
