= Glycacaridae =

Scientific classification
- Domain: Eukaryota
- Kingdom: Animalia
- Phylum: Arthropoda
- Subphylum: Chelicerata
- Class: Arachnida
- Order: Sarcoptiformes
- Family: Glycacaridae

Family of mites

Glycacaridae is a family of mites belonging to the order Sarcoptiformes.

Genera:

- Glycacarus Griffiths, 1977
