= Quadroppiidae =

Scientific classification
- Kingdom: Animalia
- Phylum: Arthropoda
- Subphylum: Chelicerata
- Class: Arachnida
- Order: Sarcoptiformes
- Family: Quadroppiidae

Synonyms
- Hexoppiidae

Family of mites

Quadroppiidae is a family of mites belonging to the order Sarcoptiformes.

Genera:

- Borhidia Balogh & Mahunka, 1974
- Coronoquadroppia Ohkubo, 1995
- Hexoppia Balogh, 1958
- Quadroppia Jacot, 1939
