= Amerobelbidae =

Scientific classification
- Domain: Eukaryota
- Kingdom: Animalia
- Phylum: Arthropoda
- Subphylum: Chelicerata
- Class: Arachnida
- Order: Sarcoptiformes
- Family: Amerobelbidae

Family of mites

Amerobelbidae is a family of mites belonging to the order Sarcoptiformes.

Genera:

- Amerobelba Berlese, 1908
- Berndamerus Mahunka, 1977
- Hellenamerus Mahunka, 1974
- Mongaillardia Grandjean, 1961
- Rastellobata Grandjean, 1961
- Roynortonia Ermilov, 2011
