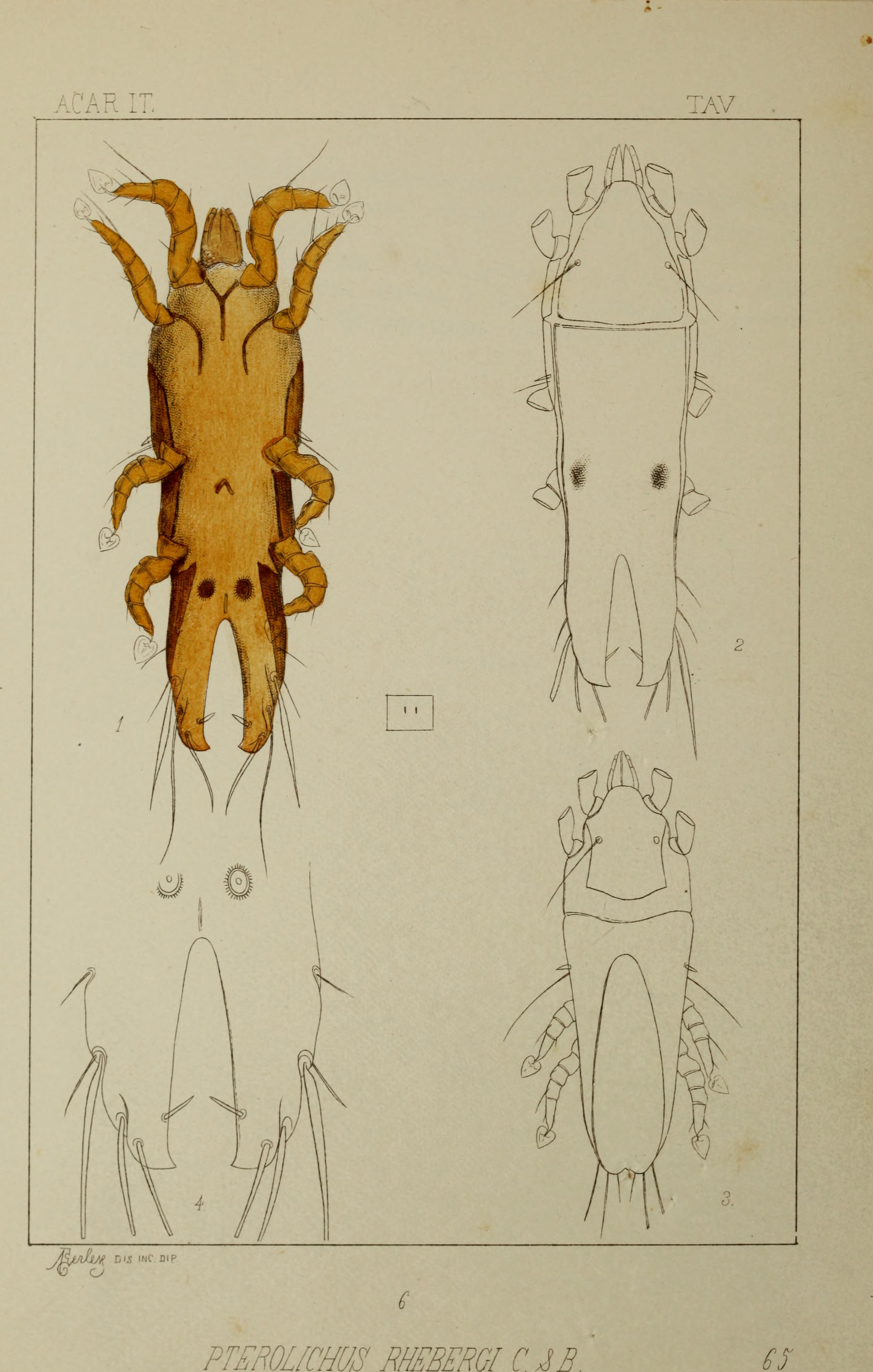
- Pterolichus sp.

Scientific classification
- Kingdom: Animalia
- Phylum: Arthropoda
- Subphylum: Chelicerata
- Class: Arachnida
- Order: Sarcoptiformes
- Family: Pterolichidae; Trouessart & Mégnin, 1884

Synonyms
- Aterolichidae

= Pterolichidae =

Family of mites

Pterolichidae is a family of mites belonging to the order Sarcoptiformes.

== Taxonomy ==
The following genera are recognised in the family Pterolichidae:

- Aegothelichus Atyeo, 1979
- Afrolichus Gaud & Atyeo, 1996
- Ambodrilus Gaud & Atyeo, 1996
- Anapodema Gaud & Mouchet, 1959
- Aniacarus Gaud & Atyeo, 1990
- Aniibius Gaud & Atyeo, 1990
- Anoplotarsus Gaud & Atyeo, 1996
- Apatelacarus Atyeo & Gaud, 1980
- Apexolichus Gaud & Atyeo, 1996
- Aralichus Gaud, 1966
- Aramobius Gaud & Atyeo, 1996
- Ardeacarus Dubinin, 1951
- Ardeialges Gaud & Mouchet, 1959
- Arhytidelasma Gaud & Atyeo, 1996
- Ascetolichus Pérez & Atyeo, 1990
- Astrolabelichus Dabert, Badek & Skoracki, 2007
- Aterolichus Gaud, 1980
- Atopolichus Gaud, 1980
- Atrichotibia Atyeo & Gaud, 1984
- Avenzoariurus Atyeo, 1985
- Botryaspsis Atyeo, 1992
- Cacatolichus Mironov & Perez, 2003
- Calvolichus Gaud & Atyeo, 1996
- Calyptolichus Mironov & Dabert, 2007
- Ceratolichus Dabert, Mironov & Ehrnsberger, 2004
- Ceratothrix Trouessart, 1916
- Charmosylichus Dabert, Mironov & Ehrnsberger, 2004
- Chelomatolichus Gaud & Atyeo, 1996
- Clastonotus Gaud, 1966
- Coccylichus Gaud, 1966
- Colinolichus Gaud & Atyeo, 1996
- Contolichus Atyeo & Gaud, 1992
- Coracopsobius Gaud & Atyeo, 1996
- Ctenodiscopus Gaud, 1980
- Cycloprotarsus Atyeo, 1992
- Cyrtonyxobius Gaud & Atyeo, 1996
- Delphinurus Gaud & Atyeo, 1996
- Diodochaetus Gaud & Atyeo, 1996
- Distigmesikya Atyeo, Gaud & Perez, 1984
- Doleracarus Atyeo & Gaud, 1980
- Dubiniania Gaud & Mouchet, 1959
- Echinofemur Atyeo & Perez, 1984
- Echinozonus Atyeo & Perez, 1991
- Epistomolichus Mironov, Pérez & Palma, 2009
- Epopolichus Gaud, 1981
- Eurypterolichus Atyeo, 1992
- Falcolichus Gaud & Atyeo, 1996
- Gabuciniella Gaud & Atyeo, 1996
- Gaudiomouchetus Özdikmen, 2008
- Genoprotolichus Gaud & Atyeo, 1996
- Geranolichus Gaud, 1968
- Goniodurus Atyeo, 1992
- Grallobia Hull, 1934
- Grallolichus Gaud, 1960
- Gruolichus Atyeo & Windingstad, 1979
- Gymnolichus Gaud & Mouchet, 1961
- Haptepigynus Atyeo, 1992
- Heliaspis Atyeo, 1992
- Herodialges Gaud, 1981
- Ibidonemoma Gaud & Atyeo, 1996
- Kakapolichus Mironov & Perez, 2003
- Leipobius Atyeo, 1992
- Lopharalichus Gaud & Atyeo, 1996
- Lorilichus Atyeo & Gaud, 1991
- Loriprotolichus Mironov & Dabert, 2007
- Madagascaracarus Gaud, 1979
- Magimelia Gaud, 1961
- Maleolichus Atyeo, 1992
- Mastigodiscus Atyeo & Gaud, 1984
- Mayracarus Atyeo, 1992
- Megapodobius Atyeo, 1992
- Mesolichus Trouessart, 1899
- Micropsittophagus Mironov & Perez, 2003
- Montchadskiana Dubinin, 1951
- Musophagobius Gaud & Atyeo, 1996
- Neardeacarus Gaud & Atyeo, 1996
- Neorhytidelasma Mironov & Perez, 2003
- Nestorilichus Mironov & Dabert, 2007
- Nyctibiolichus Atyeo, 1979
- Nymphicilichus Mironov & Galloway, 2002
- Opisthocomacarus Dubinin, 1955
- Ornatumerus Gaud & Atyeo, 1996
- Oxygynurus Atyeo, 1992
- Pararalichus Atyeo, 1989
- Pavolichus Gaud, 1965
- Pelargodacna Perez & Atyeo, 1992
- Pelargolichus Gaud, 1982
- Pereziella Atyeo, 1990
- Periexocaulus Gaud & Atyeo, 1996
- Phasidolichus Gaud & Atyeo, 1996
- Phycoferus Atyeo & Perez, 1991
- Pilochaeta Dubinin, 1956
- Prionoturus Atyeo, 1992
- Protolichus Trouessart, 1884
- Pseudalloptes Trouessart, 1884
- Pseudalloptinus Dubinin, 1956
- Pseudolichus W.T.Atyeo & J.Gaud, 1992
- Psittocolus Gaud & Atyeo, 1996
- Psittrichobius Mironov & Perez, 2003
- Pterolichus Mégnin, 1877
- Pterolichus Robin, 1868
- Pterygocrusolichus Dubinin, 1955
- Ptyssalgopus Gaud & Atyeo, 1996
- Rhynchocaulus Gaud & Berla, 1963
- Rhytidelasma Gaud, 1966
- Scolaralichus Gaud & Atyeo, 1996
- Scopusacarus Dubinin, 1956
- Scopusacarus Gaud & Mouchet, 1959
- Sideroferus Gaud & Atyeo, 1996
- Stakyonemus Atyeo & Gaud, 1971
- Struthiopterolichus Dubinin, 1955
- Synapsilobus Gaud & Atyeo, 1996
- Szeptyckiana Dabert & Labrzycka, 2009
- Taeniosikya Gaud, 1961
- Talegallobius Atyeo, 1992
- Tamnurolichus Gaud & Atyeo, 1996
- Tanyaralichus Gaud & Atyeo, 1996
- Tanysomacarus Atyeo, 1992
- Tetraolichus Atyeo & Gaud, 1992
- Titanolichus Gaud & Atyeo, 1996
- Touracobia Gaud & Mouchet, 1959
- Triphyllochaeta Dubinin, 1956
- Turnixacarus Gaud & Atyeo, 1996
- Uropsittacolichus Atyeo & Perez, 1982
- Xiphiurus Gaud & Mouchet, 1959
- Xoloptes G.Canestrini, 1879
- Xoloptoides Gaud & Mouchet, 1959
- BOLD:AED4389 (Pterolichidae sp.)
- BOLD:AED4390 (Pterolichidae sp.)
