= Chamobatidae =

Scientific classification
- Domain: Eukaryota
- Kingdom: Animalia
- Phylum: Arthropoda
- Subphylum: Chelicerata
- Class: Arachnida
- Order: Sarcoptiformes
- Family: Chamobatidae

Family of mites

Chamobatidae is a family of mites belonging to the order Sarcoptiformes.

Genera:

- Ceratobates Balogh & Mahunka, 1969
- Chamobates Hull, 1916
- Globozetes Sellnick, 1928
- Hypozetes Balogh, 1959
- Iugoribates Sellnick, 1944
- Ocesobates Aoki, 1965
- Oesobates Aoki, 1965
- Pedunculozetes Hammer, 1962
