= Suctobelbidae =

Scientific classification
- Kingdom: Animalia
- Phylum: Arthropoda
- Subphylum: Chelicerata
- Class: Arachnida
- Order: Sarcoptiformes
- Family: Suctobelbidae

Family of mites

Suctobelbidae is a family of mites belonging to the order Sarcoptiformes.

== Description ==
This family is characterized by several distinctive features. The chelicerae are stiletto-like, with a movable digitus mobilis; the subcapitulum is also correspondingly specialized; their feeding method is presumed to be piercing-sucking. The prodorsum usually exhibits a paired tectopedial field surrounded by more or less serrated chitinous bands; The lamellar bristles are closely spaced, usually on a “lamellar bud,” a compact chitinous node or ring (in Heluerobelba, these are formed as two separate chitinous nodes). Very often, the rostrum, which is arched and tapers downward, is equipped laterally with so-called “apical lobes”; behind these are usually one to four pairs of rostral marginal teeth; occasionally, the apical lobes and rostral marginal teeth are of the same structure. These rostrum structures vary considerably within the family but serve as good species-level diagnostic features. Additional structural details are provided in the identification tables where necessary.

== Genera ==
Genera:

- Allosuctobelba Moritz, 1970
- Bruneibelba Mahunka, 2001
- Coartobelba Mahunka, 2001
