= Hemisarcoptidae =

Scientific classification
- Kingdom: Animalia
- Phylum: Arthropoda
- Subphylum: Chelicerata
- Class: Arachnida
- Order: Sarcoptiformes
- Family: Hemisarcoptidae

Family of mites

Hemisarcoptidae is a family of mites belonging to the order Sarcoptiformes.

Genera:

- Congovidia Fain & Elsen, 1971
- Espeletiacarus Fain, 1987
- Giardius Perraud, 1897
- Hemisarcoptes Lignières, 1893
