= Turbinoptidae =

Scientific classification
- Kingdom: Animalia
- Phylum: Arthropoda
- Subphylum: Chelicerata
- Class: Arachnida
- Order: Sarcoptiformes
- Family: Turbinoptidae

Family of mites

Turbinoptidae is a family of mites belonging to the order Sarcoptiformes.

Genera:

- Colinoptes Fain, 1960
- Mycteroptes Fain, 1956
- Neoschoutedenocoptes Fain & Hyland, 1967
- Oxleya Domrow, 1965
- Passerrhinoptes Fain, 1956
- Rhinoptes Castro & Pereira, 1951
- Schoutedenocoptes Fain, 1956
- Turbinoptes Boyd, 1949
