= Licnodamaeidae =

Scientific classification
- Kingdom: Animalia
- Phylum: Arthropoda
- Subphylum: Chelicerata
- Class: Arachnida
- Order: Sarcoptiformes
- Family: Licnodamaeidae

Family of mites

Licnodamaeidae is a family of mites; nymphs retain their moulted exuviae until adulthood.
