= Chortoglyphidae =

Scientific classification
- Kingdom: Animalia
- Phylum: Arthropoda
- Subphylum: Chelicerata
- Class: Arachnida
- Order: Sarcoptiformes
- Family: Chortoglyphidae

Family of mites

Chortoglyphidae is a family of mites belonging to the order Sarcoptiformes.

Genera:

- Alabidopus Fain, 1967
- Aplodontopus† Fain, 1967
- Chortoglyphus Berlese, 1884
