= Achipteriidae =

Achipteriidae Temporal range: Jurassic–present

Scientific classification
- Kingdom: Animalia
- Phylum: Arthropoda
- Subphylum: Chelicerata
- Class: Arachnida
- Order: Oribatida
- Superfamily: Achipterioidea
- Family: Achipteriidae; Thor, 1929

Family of mites

Achipteriidae is a family of mites in the order Sarcoptiformes. There are about 9 genera and at least 80 described species in Achipteriidae.

== Genera ==
- Achipteria Berlese, 1885
- Anachipteria Grandjean, 1932
- Campachipteria Aoki, 1995
- Cerachipteria Grandjean, 1935
- Cubachipteria Balogh & Mahunka, 1979
- Dentachipteria Nevin, 1974
- Hoffmanacarus Mahunka, 1995
- Parachipteria Hammen, 1952
- Plakoribates Popp, 1960
