= Ametroproctidae =

Scientific classification
- Domain: Eukaryota
- Kingdom: Animalia
- Phylum: Arthropoda
- Subphylum: Chelicerata
- Class: Arachnida
- Order: Sarcoptiformes
- Family: Ametroproctidae

Family of mites

Ametroproctidae is a family of mites belonging to the order Sarcoptiformes.

Genera:

- Ametroproctus Higgins & Woolley, 1968
- Scapuleremaeus Behan-Pelletier, 1989
