= Cymbaeremaeidae =

Cymbaeremaeidae Temporal range: Jurassic–present

Scientific classification
- Kingdom: Animalia
- Phylum: Arthropoda
- Subphylum: Chelicerata
- Class: Arachnida
- Order: Oribatida
- Superfamily: Cymbaeremoidea
- Family: Cymbaeremaeidae; Sellnick, 1928

Family of mites

Cymbaeremaeidae is a family of oribatids in the order Oribatida. There are about 5 genera and at least 90 described species in Cymbaeremaeidae.

== Genera ==
- Bulleremaeus Hammer, 1966
- Cymbaeremaeus Berlese, 1896
- Glanderemaeus Balogh & Csiszár, 1963
- Scapheremaeus Berlese, 1910
- Seteremaeus Hammer, 1971
