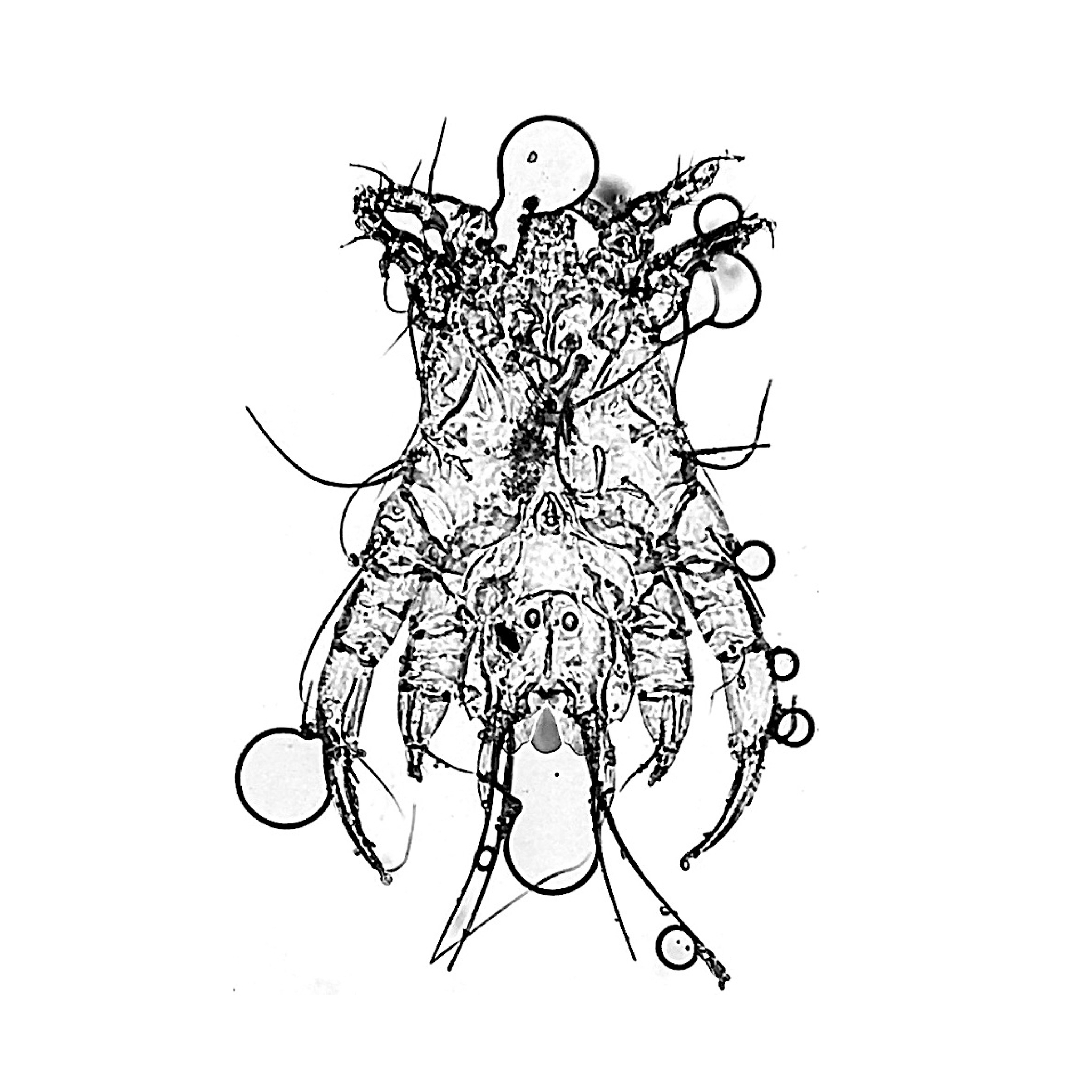
- Dubininia sp.

Scientific classification
- Kingdom: Animalia
- Phylum: Arthropoda
- Subphylum: Chelicerata
- Class: Arachnida
- Order: Sarcoptiformes
- Family: Xolalgidae; Dubinin, 1953

= Xolalgidae =

Family of arachnids

Xolalgidae is a family of mites belonging to the order Sarcoptiformes.

== Genera ==
Genera:

- Analloptes Trouessart, 1885
- Beaucournuella Gaud, 1974
- Cacatualges Dabert, Badek & Skoracki, 2007
- Dogielacarus Dubinin, 1949
- Dubininia Vassilev, 1958
- Glaucalges Gaud, 1980
- Gymnalloptes Gaud, 1968
- Ingrassia Oudemans, 1905
- Ingrassiella Dubinin, 1949
- Leptosphyra Hull, 1934
- Metingrassia Gaud, 1974
- Opetiopoda Gaud & Atyeo, 1981
- Pteralloptes Trouessart, 1885
- Tectingrassia Gaud, 1972
- Xolalges Trouessart, 1885
- Xolalgoides Gaud, 1979
