= Passalozetidae =

Scientific classification
- Domain: Eukaryota
- Kingdom: Animalia
- Phylum: Arthropoda
- Subphylum: Chelicerata
- Class: Arachnida
- Order: Sarcoptiformes
- Family: Passalozetidae

Family of mites

Passalozetidae is a family of mites belonging to the order Sarcoptiformes.

Genera:

- Bipassalozetes Mihelcic, 1957
- Passalobates Perez-Inigo & Pena, 1996
- Passalomonia Mahunka, 1987
- Passalozetes Grandjean, 1932
