= Lobalgidae =

Scientific classification
- Kingdom: Animalia
- Phylum: Arthropoda
- Subphylum: Chelicerata
- Class: Arachnida
- Order: Sarcoptiformes
- Family: Lobalgidae

Family of mites

Lobalgidae is a family of mites belonging to the order Sarcoptiformes.

Genera:

- Coendalges Fain & Mendez, 1979
- Echimytricalges Fain, 1970
- Lobalges Fonseca, 1954
