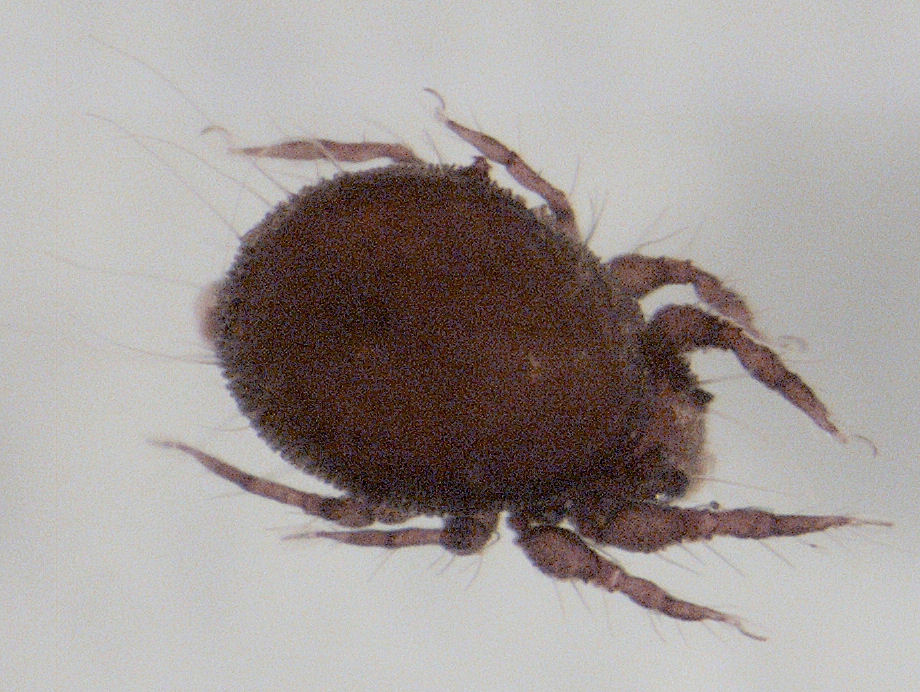
- Hermanniella longisetosa

Scientific classification
- Kingdom: Animalia
- Phylum: Arthropoda
- Subphylum: Chelicerata
- Class: Arachnida
- Order: Oribatida
- Superfamily: Hermannielloidea
- Family: Hermanniellidae; Grandjean, 1934

= Hermanniellidae =

Hermanniellidae Temporal range: Palaeogene–present

Family of mites

Hermanniellidae is a family of mites in the order Oribatida. There are 9 accepted genera and at least 50 described species in the family Hermanniellidae.

== Genera ==
- Akansilvanus Fujikawa, 1993
- Ampullobates Grandjean, 1962
- Baloghacarus Mahunka, 1983
- Dicastribates J. & P. Balogh, 1988
- Hermanniella Berlese, 1908
- Hermannobates Hammer, 1961
- Issaniella Grandjean, 1962
- Mahunkobates Calugar, 1989
- Sacculobates Grandjean, 1962
