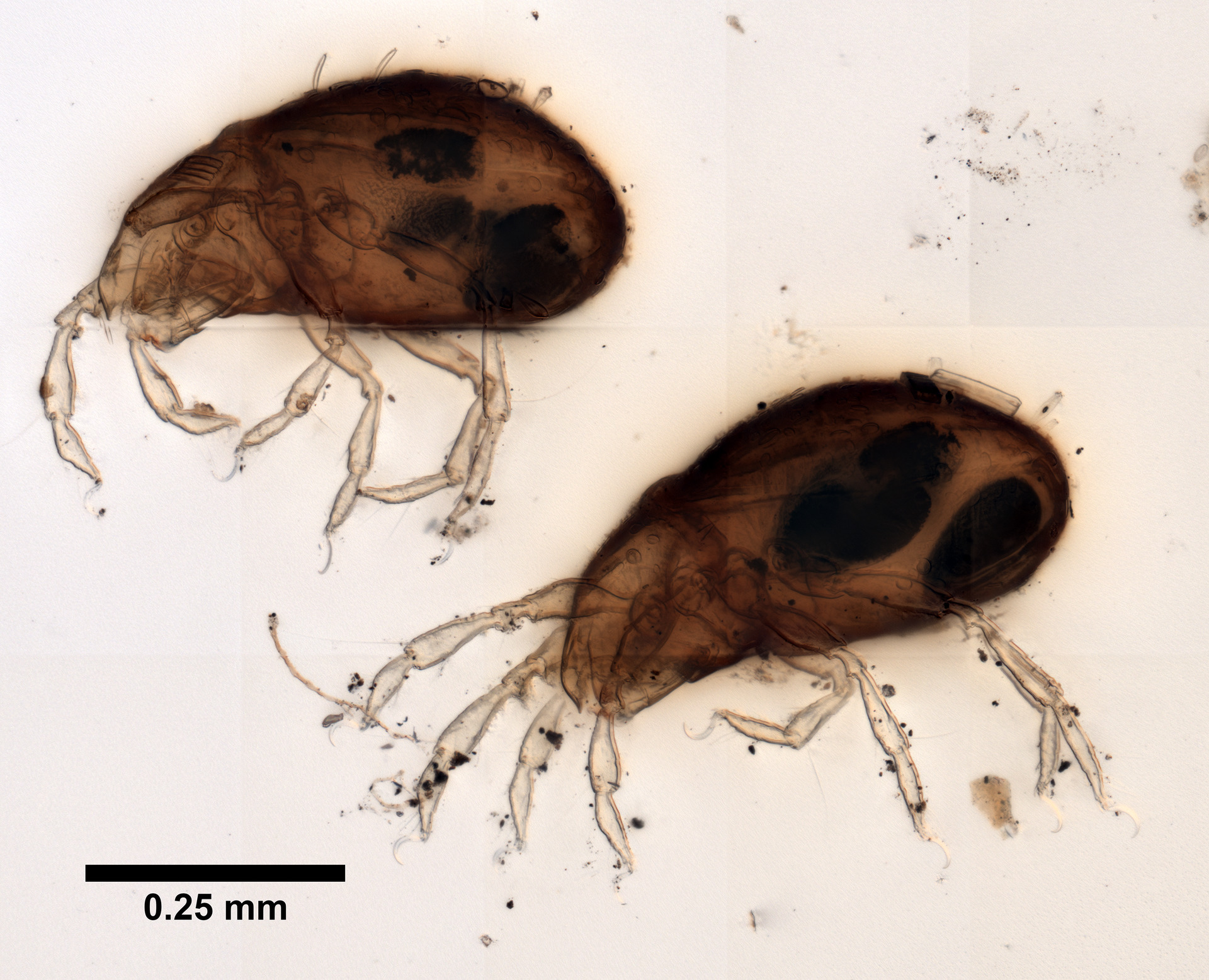
- Hydrozetidae preserved specimen

Scientific classification
- Kingdom: Animalia
- Phylum: Arthropoda
- Subphylum: Chelicerata
- Class: Arachnida
- Order: Oribatida
- Superfamily: Hydrozetoidea
- Family: Hydrozetidae; Grandjean, 1954

= Hydrozetidae =

Hydrozetidae Temporal range: Jurassic–present

Family of mites

Hydrozetidae is a family of oribatids in the order Oribatida. There is at least one genus, Hydrozetes, and at least 20 described species in Hydrozetidae.
