= Rhyncoptidae =

Scientific classification
- Kingdom: Animalia
- Phylum: Arthropoda
- Subphylum: Chelicerata
- Class: Arachnida
- Order: Sarcoptiformes
- Family: Rhyncoptidae

Family of mites

Rhyncoptidae is a family of mites belonging to the order Sarcoptiformes.

Genera:

- Rhincoptoides Fain, 1962
- Rhyncoptes Lawrence, 1956
