= Myocoptidae =

Scientific classification
- Kingdom: Animalia
- Phylum: Arthropoda
- Subphylum: Chelicerata
- Class: Arachnida
- Order: Sarcoptiformes
- Family: Myocoptidae

Family of mites

Myocoptidae is a family of mites belonging to the order Sarcoptiformes.

Genera:

- Apocalypsis Bochkov, 2010
- Criniscansor Poppe, 1889
- Dromiciocoptes Fain, 1970
- Dromicioptes Fain, 1970
- Gliricoptes Lawrence, 1956
- Histiophorus Agassiz, 1846
- Myocoptes Claparède, 1869
- Sciurocoptes Fain, Munting & Lukoschus, 1969
- Trichobius Canestrini, 1896
- Trichoecius G.Canestrini, 1899
