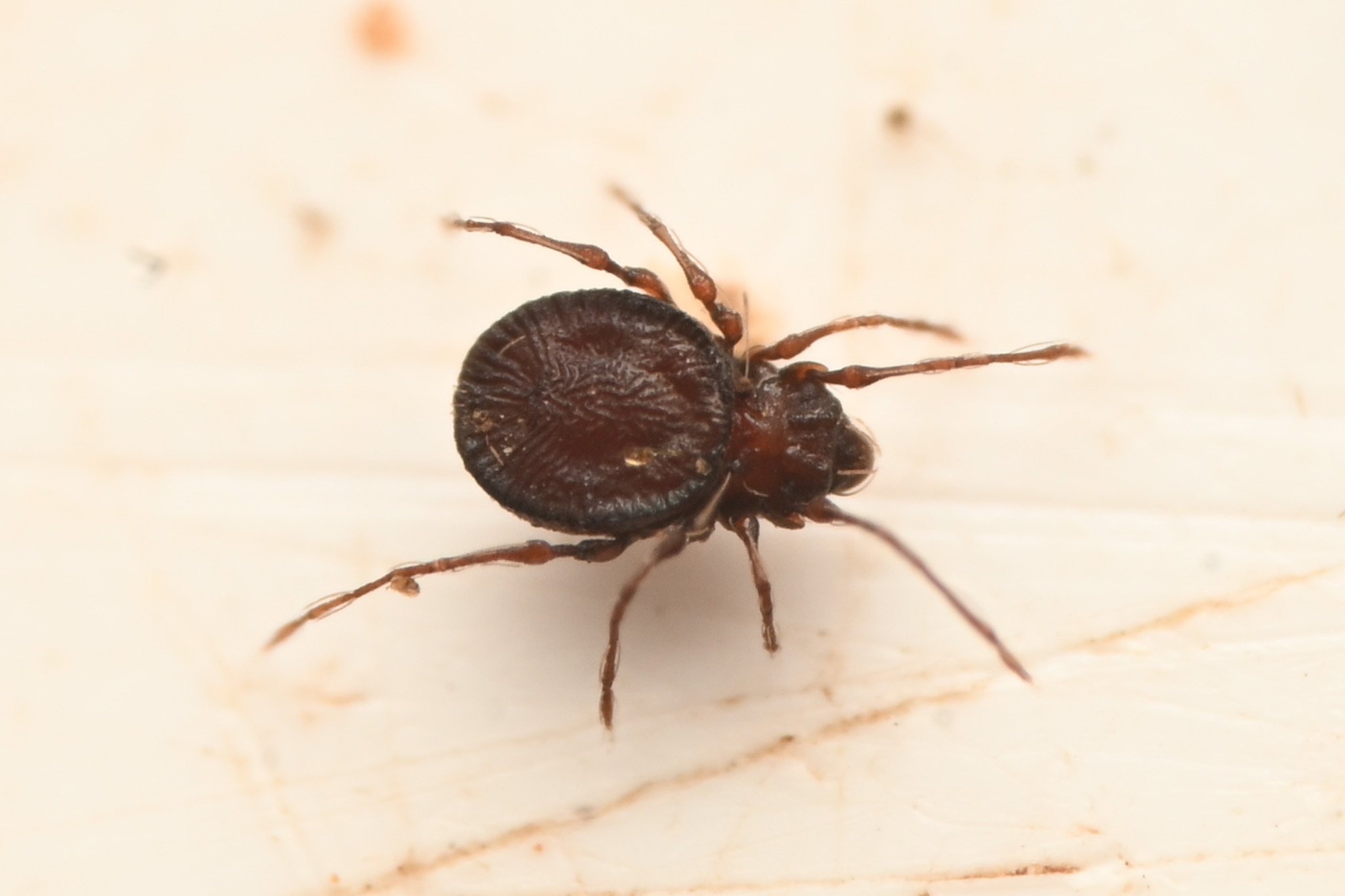
- Joshuella sp.

Scientific classification
- Kingdom: Animalia
- Phylum: Arthropoda
- Subphylum: Chelicerata
- Class: Arachnida
- Order: Oribatida
- Superfamily: Gymnodamaeoidea
- Family: Gymnodamaeidae; Grandjean, 1954

Genera
- See text

= Gymnodamaeidae =

Gymnodamaeidae Temporal range: Palaeogene–present

Family of mites

Gymnodamaeidae is a family of oribatid mites within the superfamily Gymnodamaeoidea. Members of this family are largely restricted to the northern hemisphere however inhabit a diversity of continental climates. This includes grasslands, alpine and tundra soils, old pine forests and dry patches of soil, litter or moss.

Adults are characterized by being covered in a thick, well sclerotized cerotegument that covers the cuticle. This is usually is ornamented with often a distinctive pattern on the notogaster.

== Taxonomy ==
While the ornamented cerotegument is able to provide some useful features to identify and classify species, it covers the cuticle which is also used in taxonomy. Because of this, many descriptions of these species appear to be based on either specimens which are newly moulted or clear. The taxonomy of many North American Gymnodamaeids is currently unresolved.

There have been about 8 genera and at least 60 described species in Gymnodamaeidae. Genera that belong the family are listed below:

- Adrodamaeus Paschoal, 1984
- Arthrodamaeus Grandjean, 1954
- Austrodamaeus Balogh & Mahunka, 1981
- Gymnodamaeus Kulczynski, 1902
- Jacotella Banks, 1947
- Joshuella Wallwork, 1972
- Nortonella Paschoal, 1982
- Plesiodamaeus Grandjean, 1954
