= Ameridae =

Scientific classification
- Kingdom: Animalia
- Phylum: Arthropoda
- Subphylum: Chelicerata
- Class: Arachnida
- Order: Oribatida
- Family: Ameridae; Bulanova-Zakhvatkina, 1957

Family of mites

Ameridae is a family of mites belonging to the order Oribatida.

Genera:

- Amerus Berlese, 1883
- Andesamerus Hammer, 1962
- Caenosamerus Higgins & Woolley, 1970
- Cristamerus Hammer, 1977
- Ctenamerus Balogh & Balogh, 1992
- Haplamerus Balogh & Balogh, 1992
- Hymenobelba Balogh, 1962
- Neamerus Willmann, 1939
- Petramerus Balogh, 1964
