= Chirodiscidae =

Scientific classification
- Domain: Eukaryota
- Kingdom: Animalia
- Phylum: Arthropoda
- Subphylum: Chelicerata
- Class: Arachnida
- Order: Sarcoptiformes
- Family: Chirodiscidae

Synonyms
- Labidocarpidae

Family of mites

Chirodiscidae is a family of mites belonging to the order Sarcoptiformes.

Genera:

- Adentocarpus Fain, 1972
- Afrolabidocarpus Fain, 1970
- Alabidocarpus Ewing, 1929
- Asiolabidocarpus Fain, 1972
- Chirodiscus Trouessart & Neumann, 1890
- Dentocarpus Dusbábek & La Cruz, 1966
- Eulabidocarpus Lawrence
- Eurolabidocarpus Fain & Aellen, 1994
- Glossophagocarpus La Cruz, 1973
- Labidocarpoides Fain, 1970
- Labidocarpus Trouessart, 1895
- Lawrenceocarpus Dusbábek & La Cruz, 1966
- Lutrilichus Fain, 1970
- Olabidocarpus Lawrence, 1948
- Parakosa McDaniel & Lawrence, 1962</
- Paralabidocarpus Pinichpongse, 1963
- Paralawrenceocarpus Guerrero, 1992
- Pseudoalabidocarpus McDaniel, 1972
- Pteropiella Fain, 1970
- Rynconyssus Fain, 1967
- Schizocoptes Lawrence, 1944
- Soricilichus Fain, 1970
- Trilabidocarpus Fain, 1970
