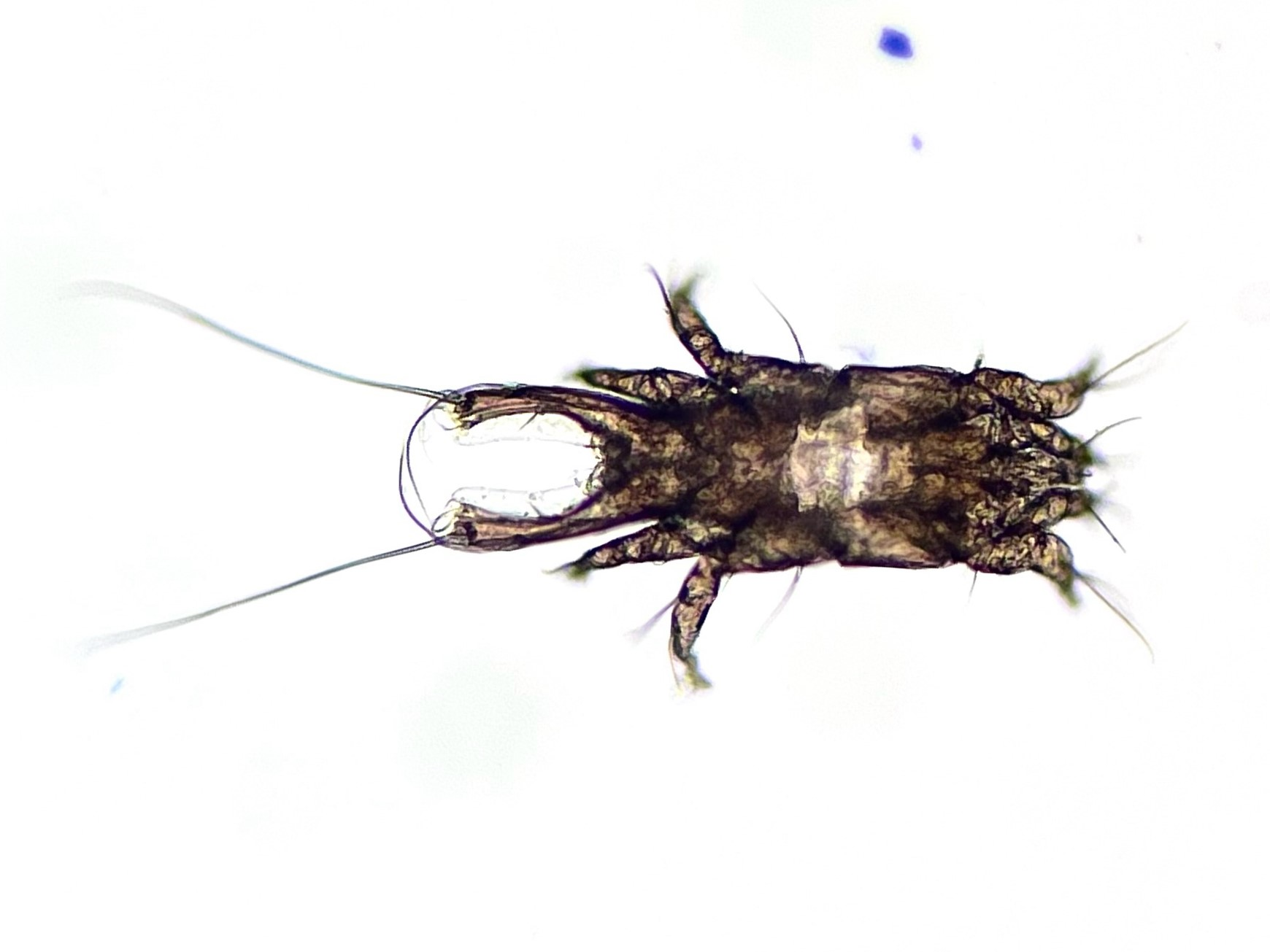
- Brephosceles sp

Scientific classification
- Kingdom: Animalia
- Phylum: Arthropoda
- Subphylum: Chelicerata
- Class: Arachnida
- Order: Sarcoptiformes
- Family: Alloptidae; Gaud, 1957

Genera
- See text

= Alloptidae =

Family of mites

Alloptidae is a family of mites belonging to the order Sarcoptiformes.

== Genera ==
Genera:

- Alloptellus Dubinin, 1955
- Alloptes Canestrini, 1879
- Alloptoides Gaud, 1961
- Anisanchus Peterson & Atyeo, 1977
- Aramolichus Peterson & Atyeo, 1968
- Brephosceles Hull, 1934
- Ceraturoptellus Cerny, 1969
- Dichobrephosceles Peterson & Atyeo, 1968
- Dinalloptes Gaud & Mouchet, 1957
- Diomedalloptes Mironov, 1998
- Echinacarus Dubinin, 1949
- Fregatocolus Atyeo & Peterson, 1992
- Gaudium Peterson & Atyeo, 1972
- Heterobrephosceles Peterson & Atyeo, 1978
- Homeobrephosceles Peterson & Atyeo, 1968
- Hyperpedalloptes Dubinin, 1955
- Ibidocolus Mironov, 1998
- Laminalloptes Dubinin, 1955
- Megalloptes Mironov & Perez, 2001
- Nealloptes Gaud & Mouchet, 1957
- Onychalloptes Peterson & Atyeo, 1968
- Oxyalges Gaud & Mouchet, 1959
- Paradoxalloptes Mironov, 1999
- Plicatalloptes Dubinin, 1955
- Psilobrephosceles Peterson & Atyeo, 1968
- Ptyctalloptes Mironov, 2002
- Rhynchalloptes Peterson & Atyeo, 1977
- Spinicnemis Mironov, 2002
- Tauralloptes Mironov, 2002
- Thyzanocercus Gaud & Mouchet, 1957
