= Micreremidae =

Micreremidae Temporal range: Jurassic–present

Scientific classification
- Kingdom: Animalia
- Phylum: Arthropoda
- Subphylum: Chelicerata
- Class: Arachnida
- Order: Oribatida
- Superfamily: Cymbaeremoidea
- Family: Micreremidae; Grandjean, 1954

Family of mites

Micreremidae is a family of oribatids in the order Oribatida. There are at least 4 genera and about 14 described species in Micreremidae.

== Genera ==
- Fenichelia Balogh, 1970
- Mexiceremus J. & P. Balogh, 1998
- Micreremus Berlese, 1908
- Phylloribatula Balogh & Mahunka, 1978
