= Feather mite =

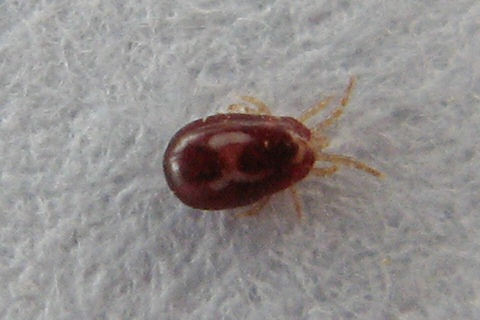
Dermanyssus gallinae

Feather mites are the members of diverse mite superfamilies:

- superorder Acariformes
  - Psoroptidia
    - Analgoidea
    - Freyanoidea
    - Pterolichoidea
- superorder Parasitiformes
  - Dermanyssoidea

They are ectoparasites on birds, hence the common name.
