= Trouessartiidae =

Scientific classification
- Kingdom: Animalia
- Phylum: Arthropoda
- Subphylum: Chelicerata
- Class: Arachnida
- Order: Sarcoptiformes
- Family: Trouessartiidae

Family of mites

Trouessartiidae is a family of mites belonging to the order Sarcoptiformes.

Genera:

- Allanalges Trouessart, 1887
- Arthrogynalges Orwig, 1968
- Bicentralges Orwig, 1968
- Calcealges Gaud, 1952
- Hemicalcealges Gaud & Mouchet, 1957
- Neocalcealges Orwig, 1968
- Proterocaulus Gaud, 1981
- Pseudalges Radford, 1950
- Pseudalges Robin, 1868
- Steatacarus Atyeo & Peterson, 1977
- Trouessartia Canestrini & Kramer, 1899
- Uniscutalges Orwig, 1968
