= Allodamaeus ewingi =

Scientific classification
- Domain: Eukaryota
- Kingdom: Animalia
- Phylum: Arthropoda
- Subphylum: Chelicerata
- Class: Arachnida
- Order: Oribatida
- Family: Plateremaeidae
- Genus: Allodamaeus
- Species: A. ewingi

Binomial name
- Allodamaeus ewingi Banks, 1947

Species of mite

Allodamaeus ewingi is a species of oribatid in the family Plateremaeidae.
