= Baloghiella =

Baloghiella may refer to:

- Baloghiella (mite) Bulanova-Zachvatkina, 1960, a genus of arachnids in the family Haplozetidae
- Baloghiella (beetle) Mandl, 1981, a genus of insects in the family Cicindelidae
