= Gozmanyina majestus =

Scientific classification
- Domain: Eukaryota
- Kingdom: Animalia
- Phylum: Arthropoda
- Subphylum: Chelicerata
- Class: Arachnida
- Order: Oribatida
- Family: Cosmochthoniidae
- Genus: Gozmanyina
- Species: G. majestus

Binomial name
- Gozmanyina majestus (Marshall & Reeves, 1971)

Species of mite

Gozmanyina majestus is a species of cosmochthoniid in the family Cosmochthoniidae.
