= Microtritia stria =

Scientific classification
- Kingdom: Animalia
- Phylum: Arthropoda
- Subphylum: Chelicerata
- Class: Arachnida
- Order: Oribatida
- Family: Euphthiracaridae
- Genus: Microtritia
- Species: M. stria

Binomial name
- Microtritia stria Liu & Zhang, 2014

Species of mite

Microtritia stria is a species of mite.

== Distribution ==
The species is found in New Zealand.
