= Hoplophthiracarus hiore =

Scientific classification
- Kingdom: Animalia
- Phylum: Arthropoda
- Subphylum: Chelicerata
- Class: Arachnida
- Order: Oribatida
- Family: Steganacaridae
- Genus: Hoplophthiracarus
- Species: H. hiore

Binomial name
- Hoplophthiracarus hiore (Liu & Zhang, 2014)

Species of Arachnid

Hoplophthiracarus hiore is a species of mite, originally described as Austrophthiracarus hiore.

== Distribution ==
The species is found in New Zealand.
