= Mochloribatula texana =

Scientific classification
- Kingdom: Animalia
- Phylum: Arthropoda
- Subphylum: Chelicerata
- Class: Arachnida
- Order: Oribatida
- Family: Mochlozetidae
- Genus: Mochloribatula
- Species: M. texana

Binomial name
- Mochloribatula texana (Ewing, 1909)

Species of mite

Mochloribatula texana is a species of mite in the family Mochlozetidae.
