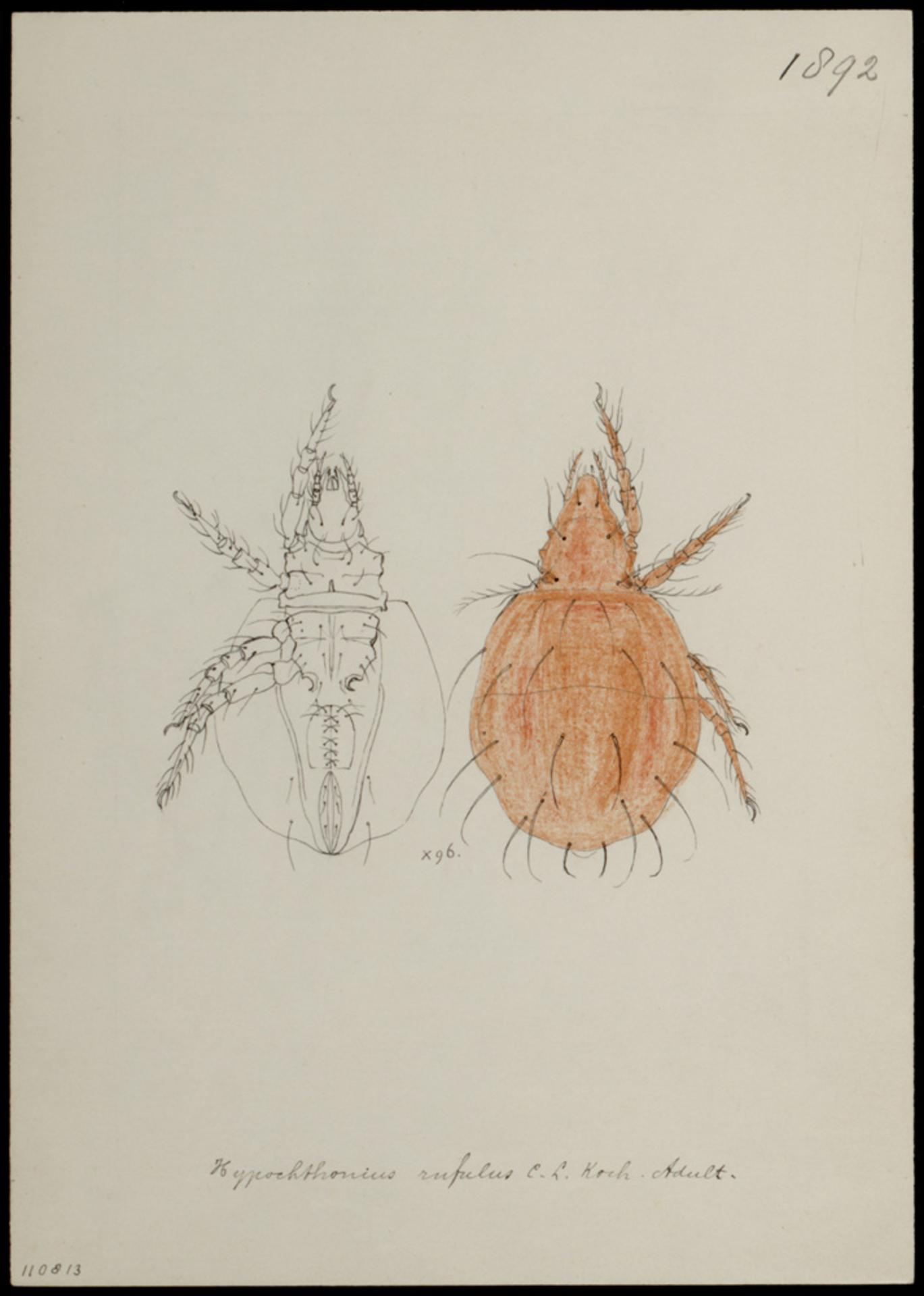

Scientific classification
- Kingdom: Animalia
- Phylum: Arthropoda
- Subphylum: Chelicerata
- Class: Arachnida
- Order: Oribatida
- Family: Hypochthoniidae
- Genus: Hypochthonius
- Species: H. rufulus

Binomial name
- Hypochthonius rufulus Koch, 1835

= Hypochthonius rufulus =

Species of mite

Hypochthonius rufulus is a species of mite in the family Hypochthoniidae. It is found in Europe.

== Subspecies ==
These four subspecies belong to the species Hypochthonius rufulus:

- Hypochthonius rufulus carolinicus Jacot, 1936
- Hypochthonius rufulus europaeus Krivolutsky, 1965
- Hypochthonius rufulus paucipectinatus Jacot, 1934
- Hypochthonius rufulus rufulus Koch, 1835
