= Austrophthiracarus =

Scientific classification
- Kingdom: Animalia
- Phylum: Arthropoda
- Subphylum: Chelicerata
- Class: Arachnida
- Order: Oribatida
- Family: Steganacaridae
- Genus: Austrophthiracarus; Balogh & Mahunka, 1978

Type species
- Austrophthiracarus radiatus Balogh & Mahunka, 1978

Genus of mites

Austrophthiracarus is a genus of mites in the family Steganacaridae.

== Species ==
- Austrophthiracarus aculeatus Niedbala & Colloff, 1997
- Austrophthiracarus admirabilis (Niedbała, 1982)
- Austrophthiracarus aenus Niedbała, 2000
- Austrophthiracarus amus Niedbala & Stary, 2014
- Austrophthiracarus anceps Niedbała, 2004
- Austrophthiracarus andinus (P. Balogh, 1984)
- Austrophthiracarus anosculpturatus (Mahunka, 1987)
- Austrophthiracarus aokii (Mahunka, 1983)
- Austrophthiracarus aureus Niedbała, 2000
- Austrophthiracarus bah Liu & Zhang, 2015
- Austrophthiracarus baloghi Niedbała, 1987
- Austrophthiracarus bicarinatus Niedbala & Stary, 2014
- Austrophthiracarus cajanumaensis Niedbała & Illig, 2007
- Austrophthiracarus candidulus (Niedbała, 1983)
- Austrophthiracarus caudatus (Balogh & Mahunka, 1977)
- Austrophthiracarus comosus (Aoki, 1980)
- Austrophthiracarus concolor (Sergienko, 2000)
- Austrophthiracarus cordylus Niedbała, 2006
- Austrophthiracarus costai (Macfarlane & Sheals, 1965)
- Austrophthiracarus cronadun Liu & Zhang, 2013
- Austrophthiracarus daimonios Niedbała, 2000
- Austrophthiracarus darwini (Mahunka, 1980)
- Austrophthiracarus dewalteri Liu & Zhang, 2016
- Austrophthiracarus diazae (Ojeda, 1985)
- Austrophthiracarus dilucidus (Niedbała, 1988)
- Austrophthiracarus dissonus Niedbala & Colloff, 1997
- Austrophthiracarus duplex (Mahunka & Mahunka-Papp, 2010)
- Austrophthiracarus egregius Niedbala & Colloff, 1997
- Austrophthiracarus elconsuleoensis Niedbała & Illig, 2007
- Austrophthiracarus elizabethiensis (Niedbała, 1988)
- Austrophthiracarus equisetosus (Mahunka, 1980)
- Austrophthiracarus espeletius (P. Balogh, 1984)
- Austrophthiracarus excellens (Niedbała, 1982)
- Austrophthiracarus facetus Niedbala & Colloff, 1997
- Austrophthiracarus feideri (Balogh & Csiszár, 1963)
- Austrophthiracarus filiformis Liu & Chen, 2014
- Austrophthiracarus flagellatus Liu & OConnor, 2014
- Austrophthiracarus foaensis Niedbała & Penttinen, 2007
- Austrophthiracarus foveoreticulatus (Mahunka, 1980)
- Austrophthiracarus fusticulus Niedbała, 2000
- Austrophthiracarus glennieensis Niedbała, 2006
- Austrophthiracarus globifer (Hammer, 1962)
- Austrophthiracarus golondrinasensis Niedbała & Illig, 2007
- Austrophthiracarus gomerensis Niedbała, 2008
- Austrophthiracarus gongylos Niedbała, 2004
- Austrophthiracarus hallidayi Niedbala & Colloff, 1997
- Austrophthiracarus heteropilosus Niedbała, 2004
- Austrophthiracarus heterotrichus (Mahunka, 1979)
- Austrophthiracarus hiore Liu & Zhang, 2014
- Austrophthiracarus hirtus (P. Balogh, 1984)
- Austrophthiracarus incrassatus (Niedbała, 1984)
- Austrophthiracarus inusitatus (Niedbała, 1983)
- Austrophthiracarus jumbongiensis Niedbała, 2002
- Austrophthiracarus karioi Liu & Zhang, 2014
- Austrophthiracarus kirikiri Liu & Zhang, 2015
- Austrophthiracarus konwerskii Niedbala, 2012
- Austrophthiracarus lacunosus Niedbała, 2008
- Austrophthiracarus lamingtoni Niedbała, 2000
- Austrophthiracarus largus Niedbała, 2000
- Austrophthiracarus latior (Niedbała, 1982)
- Austrophthiracarus longisetosus Liu & Chen, 2014
- Austrophthiracarus longus Niedbała, 2017
- Austrophthiracarus maritimus (Pérez-Íñigo & Pérez-Íñigo, 1996)
- Austrophthiracarus matuku Liu & Zhang, 2014
- Austrophthiracarus michaeli (Niedbała, 1987)
- Austrophthiracarus minisetosus Niedbała, 2004
- Austrophthiracarus mirandus (Niedbała, 1988)
- Austrophthiracarus mitratus (Aoki, 1980)
- Austrophthiracarus multisetosus Balogh & Balogh, 1983
- Austrophthiracarus mutabilis Niedbala & Colloff, 1997
- Austrophthiracarus neonominatus Liu & Wu, 2016 (new name for Austrophthiracarus parapulchellus Niedbała, 2016)
- Austrophthiracarus neotrichus (Wallwork, 1966)
- Austrophthiracarus nexilis Niedbała, 2003
- Austrophthiracarus nimius Niedbała, 2009
- Austrophthiracarus nitidus (Pérez-Iñigo & Baggio, 1988)
- Austrophthiracarus notoporosus Liu & Zhang, 2014
- Austrophthiracarus oenipontanus (Mahunka, 1982)
- Austrophthiracarus olivaceus (Jacot, 1929)
- Austrophthiracarus papillosus (Parry, 1979)
- Austrophthiracarus paraandinus (Subías, 2010)
- Austrophthiracarus paracronadun Liu & Wu, 2016
- Austrophthiracarus parafusticulus Niedbała, 2006
- Austrophthiracarus parainusitatus Niedbała & Stary, 2011
- Austrophthiracarus paralargus Niedbała & Penttinen, 2007
- Austrophthiracarus parapilosus Niedbała, 2006
- Austrophthiracarus parapulchellus Niedbała, 2006
- Austrophthiracarus pavidus (Berlese, 1913)
- Austrophthiracarus perpropinqus Niedbala & Colloff, 1997
- Austrophthiracarus perti (Niedbała, 1987)
- Austrophthiracarus phaleratus (Niedbała, 1982)
- Austrophthiracarus pilosus Niedbala & Colloff, 1997
- Austrophthiracarus portentosus (Niedbała, 1988)
- Austrophthiracarus pseudotuberculatus Mahunka, 2008
- Austrophthiracarus pulchellus Niedbała, 1993
- Austrophthiracarus pullus (Niedbała, 1989)
- Austrophthiracarus rabacalensis Niedbala, 2013
- Austrophthiracarus radiatus Balogh & Mahunka, 1978
- Austrophthiracarus retrorsus Niedbała, 2003
- Austrophthiracarus ridiculus (Mahunka, 1982)
- Austrophthiracarus sarawaki Niedbała, 2000
- Austrophthiracarus scopoli (Niedbała, 1987)
- Austrophthiracarus sellnicki (Niedbała, 1987)
- Austrophthiracarus setiformis Liu, 2017
- Austrophthiracarus strigosus (Niedbała, 1984)
- Austrophthiracarus sudamericanus (Pérez-Iñigo & Baggio, 1993)
- Austrophthiracarus tawhai Liu & Zhang, 2013
- Austrophthiracarus traegardhi (Niedbała, 1987)
- Austrophthiracarus trapezoides Fuangarworn & Lekprayoon, 2011
- Austrophthiracarus tricarinatus (Niedbała, 1988)
- Austrophthiracarus tuberculatus Niedbała & Corpuz-Raros, 1998
- Austrophthiracarus valdiviaensis Niedbała, 2008
- Austrophthiracarus vestigius Liu & Wu, 2016
- Austrophthiracarus vicinus (Niedbała, 1984)
- Austrophthiracarus villosus (Niedbała, 1982)
- Austrophthiracarus waitere Liu & Zhang, 2015
- Austrophthiracarus warburtonensis Niedbała, 2006
- Austrophthiracarus weldboroughensis Niedbała, 2006
- Austrophthiracarus willmanni Niedbała, 1987
- Austrophthiracarus zeuktos Niedbała, 2003
