= Synchthonius elegans =

Scientific classification
- Kingdom: Animalia
- Phylum: Arthropoda
- Subphylum: Chelicerata
- Class: Arachnida
- Order: Oribatida
- Family: Brachychthoniidae
- Genus: Synchthonius
- Species: S. elegans

Binomial name
- Synchthonius elegans Forsslund, 1957

Species of mite

Synchthonius elegans is a species of beetle mites that belongs to the family Brachychthoniidae. This species can be found in Europe.
