= Crotonia =

Crotonia or Crotonia may refer to:

- Crotonia, a genus of mites in the family Crotoniidae
- Crotonia, a literary society
