= Gozmanyina =

Scientific classification
- Domain: Eukaryota
- Kingdom: Animalia
- Phylum: Arthropoda
- Subphylum: Chelicerata
- Class: Arachnida
- Order: Oribatida
- Family: Cosmochthoniidae
- Genus: Gozmanyina; Balogh & Mahunka, 1983

Genus of mites

Gozmanyina is a genus of cosmochthoniids in the family Cosmochthoniidae. There are at least three described species in Gozmanyina.

== Species ==
These three species belong to the genus Gozmanyina:

- Gozmanyina golosovae (Gordeeva, 1980)
- Gozmanyina majestus (Marshall & Reeves, 1971)
- Gozmanyina pehuen R. Martínez & Casanueva, 1996
