= Haplozetidae =

Haplozetidae Temporal range: Palaeogene–present

Scientific classification
- Kingdom: Animalia
- Phylum: Arthropoda
- Subphylum: Chelicerata
- Class: Arachnida
- Order: Oribatida
- Superfamily: Oripodoidea
- Family: Haplozetidae; Grandjean, 1936

Family of mites

Haplozetidae is a family of mites and ticks in the order Sarcoptiformes. There are at least 20 genera and 210 described species in Haplozetidae.

== Genera ==
- Acutozetes Balogh, 1970
- Afroleius Mahunka, 1984
- Baloghia Mahunka, 1994
- Baloghiella Bulanova-Zachvatkina, 1960
- Berlesiella Hammer, 1979
- Bolkiah Mahunka, 1997
- Borneozetes Mahunka, 1997
- Cantharozetes Hammer, 1961
- Conozetes Balogh & Mahunka, 1969
- Incabates
- Indoribates Jacot, 1929
- Lauritzenia Hammer, 1958
- Magyaria Balaogh, 1963
- Paraxylobates Balogh & Mahunka, 1969
- Peloribates Berlese, 1908
- Pilobatella Balogh & Mahunka, 1967
- Pilobates Balogh, 1960
- Rostrozetes
- Setincabates Lee, 1993
- Trachyoribates Berlese, 1908
