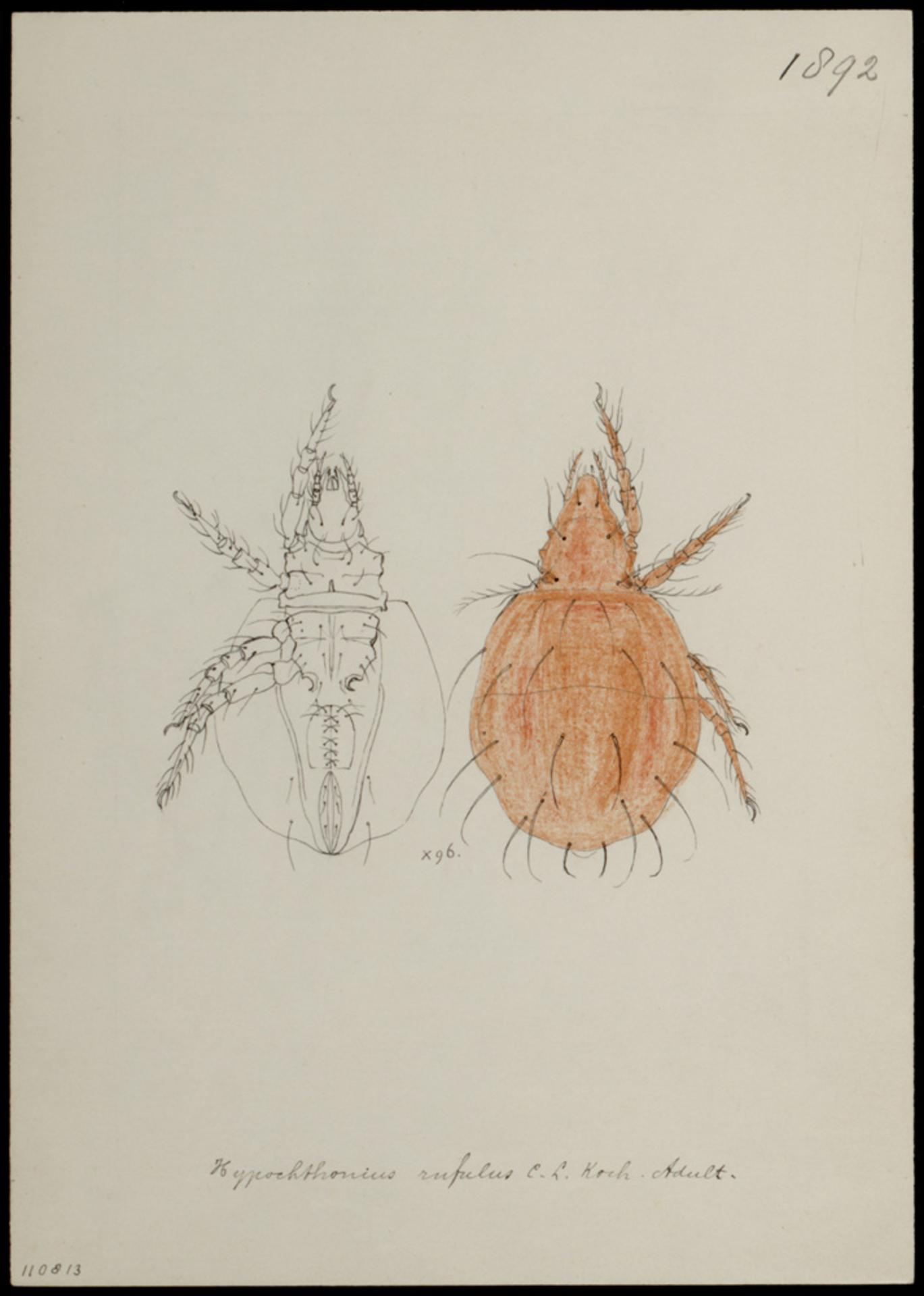
- Illustration of Hypochthonius rufulus.

Scientific classification
- Kingdom: Animalia
- Phylum: Arthropoda
- Subphylum: Chelicerata
- Class: Arachnida
- Order: Oribatida
- Family: Hypochthoniidae
- Genus: Hypochthonius; Koch, 1835

= Hypochthonius =

Genus of mites

Hypochthonius is a genus of mites in the family Hypochthoniidae. There are about 10 described species in Hypochthonius.

== Species ==
These 10 species belong to the genus Hypochthonius:

- Hypochthonius elegans Hammer, 1979
- Hypochthonius lalirostris Schweizer, 1956
- Hypochthonius latirostris Schweizer, 1956
- Hypochthonius longus Ewing
- Hypochthonius luteus Oudemans, 1917
- Hypochthonius montanus Fujikawa, 2003
- Hypochthonius pallidulus
- Hypochthonius rufulus Koch, 1835
- Hypochthonius texanus Banks, 1910
- Hypochthonius ventricosus (Canestrini, 1898)
