= Pilocepheus =

Conservation status
- Near Threatened (IUCN 3.1)

Scientific classification
- Kingdom: Animalia
- Phylum: Arthropoda
- Subphylum: Chelicerata
- Class: Arachnida
- Order: Oribatida
- Family: Compactozetidae
- Genus: Pilocepheus; Pérez-Íñigo, 1992
- Species: P. azoricus

Binomial name
- Pilocepheus azoricus Pérez-Íñigo, 1992

Genus of mites

Pilocepheus is a monotypic genus of oribatid mites in the family Compactozetidae. It contains only one species, Pilocepheus azoricus, and is endemic to the eastern half of the Azores archipelago.
