= Synchthonius =

Scientific classification
- Kingdom: Animalia
- Phylum: Arthropoda
- Subphylum: Chelicerata
- Class: Arachnida
- Order: Oribatida
- Family: Brachychthoniidae
- Genus: Synchthonius van der Hammen, 1952

Species
- Synchthonius crenulatus; Synchthonius elegans; Synchthonius lentus

Genus of mites

Synchthonius is a genus of beetle mites that belongs to the family Brachychthoniidae.

== Taxonomy ==
=== Species ===
This genus currently contains three species. They are listed below:

- Synchthonius crenulatus (Jacot, 1938)
- Synchthonius elegans Forsslund, 1956
- Synchthonius lentus (Chinone, 1974)
