= Baloghia (mite) =

Scientific classification
- Kingdom: Animalia
- Phylum: Arthropoda
- Subphylum: Chelicerata
- Class: Arachnida
- Order: Oribatida
- Family: Haplozetidae
- Genus: Baloghia; Mahunka, 1994

Genus of mites

Baloghia is a genus of arachnids in the family Haplozetidae. There are at least two described species in Baloghia.

== Species ==
- Baloghia juditae Mahunka, 1994
- Baloghia spinifera Mahunka, 1994
