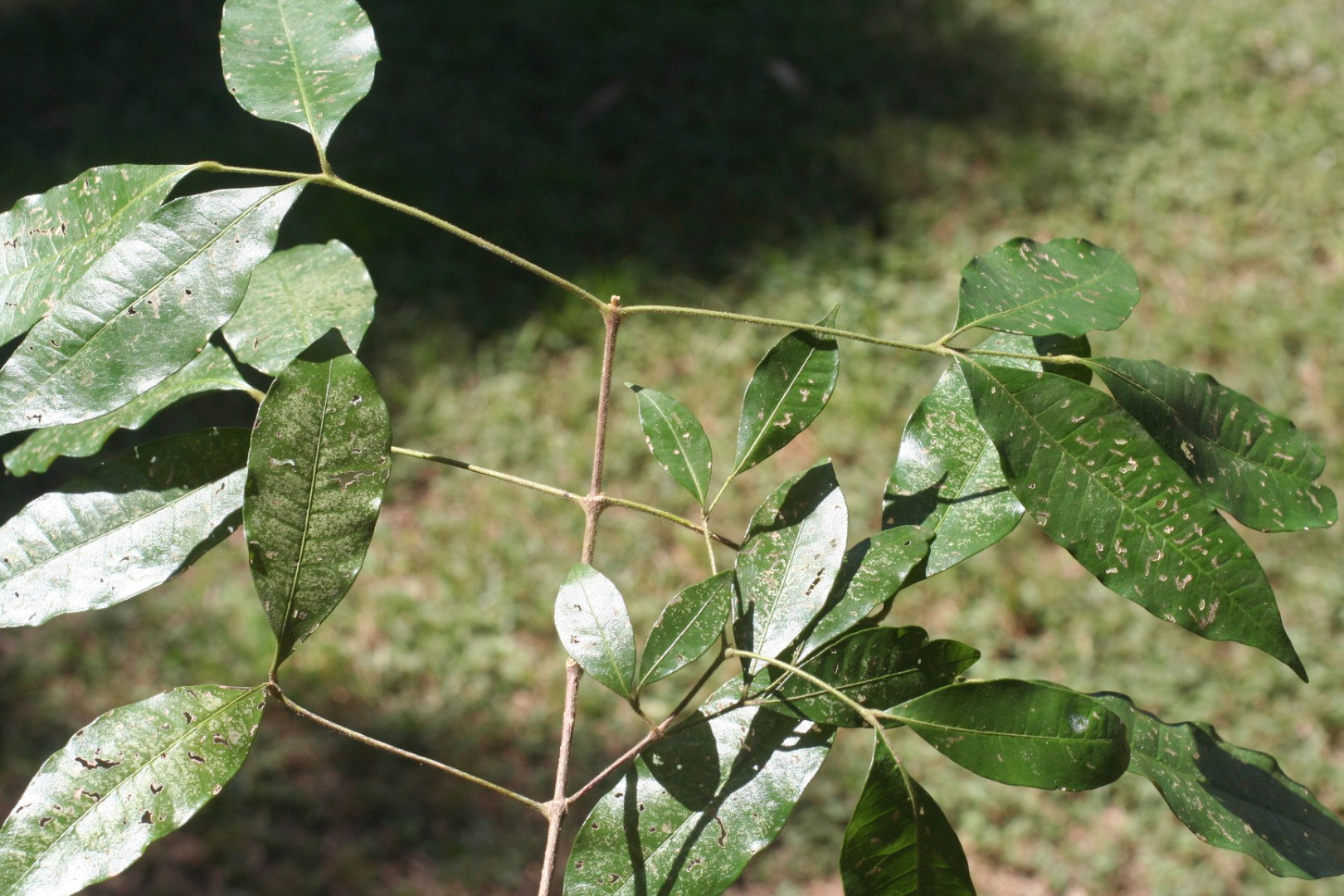
- Bouchardatia neurococca near Mount Mellum

Scientific classification
- Kingdom: Plantae
- Clade: Tracheophytes
- Clade: Angiosperms
- Clade: Eudicots
- Clade: Rosids
- Order: Sapindales
- Family: Rutaceae
- Subfamily: Zanthoxyloideae
- Genus: Bouchardatia; Baill.

Species
- See text.

= Bouchardatia =

Genus of flowering plants

Bouchardatia is a genus of two species of tree in the family Rutaceae, one species endemic to eastern Australia, the other to New Guinea. They have compound leaves with three or five leaflets, and are arranged in opposite pairs. The flowers are bisexual, arranged in panicles, each flower with four sepals, four petals and eight stamens, the petals and stamens all free from each other. The fruit has up to four ridged follicles fused at the base, each containing a single seed.

== Description ==
Plants in the genus Bouchardatia are shrubs or trees with compound leaves arranged in opposite pairs, the leaves with three or five leaflets, rarely two or the leaves simple. The flowers are bisexual with four sepals fused at the base, four petals that are free from each other but overlapping each other, and eight stamens that alternate in length. The fruit is of up to four ridged follicles joined at the base with a woody exocarp. Each follicle contains a single shiny brown seed.

== Taxonomy ==
The genus Bouchardatia was first formally described in 1867 by Henri Ernest Baillon in the journal Adansonia. The first species to be described was B. australis, now considered to be a synonym of B. neurococca.

=== Species list ===
The names of two species are accepted by Plants of the World Online:

- Bouchardatia cyanosperma Ridl. that is endemic to New Guinea;
- Bouchardatia neurococca (F.Muell.) Baill. that is endemic to eastern Australia.

== Distribution and habitat ==
Bouchardatia neurococca grows in rainforest, especially dry rainforest, from near sea level to an altitude of 630 m (2,070 ft) and from Mackay in central-eastern Queensland to the Richmond River in north-eastern New South Wales. Bouchardatia cyanosperma occurs in New Guinea.

== Ecology ==
Bouchardatia leaves possess domatia that are inhabited by oribatid mites.
