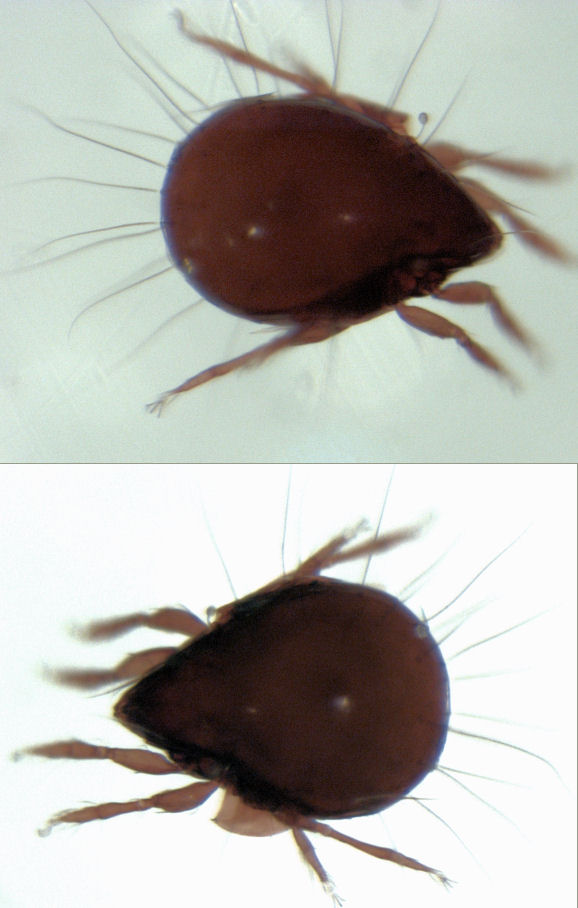
- Peloribates

Scientific classification
- Domain: Eukaryota
- Kingdom: Animalia
- Phylum: Arthropoda
- Subphylum: Chelicerata
- Class: Arachnida
- Order: Oribatida
- Suborder: Brachypylina
- Superfamily: Oripodoidea; Jacot, 1925

= Oripodoidea =

Oripodoidea Temporal range: Palaeogene–present

Superfamily of mites

Oripodoidea is a superfamily of oribatids in the order Oribatida. There are about 19 families and at least 1,300 described species in Oripodoidea.

== Families ==
These 19 families belong to the superfamily Oripodoidea:

- Caloppiidae Balogh, 1960
- Drymobatidae J. & P. Balogh, 1984
- Haplozetidae Grandjean, 1936
- Hemileiidae J. & P. Balogh, 1984
- Liebstadiidae J. & P. Balogh, 1984
- Maudheimiidae J. & P. Balogh, 1984
- Mochlozetidae Grandjean, 1960
- Nasobatidae Balogh, 1972
- Neotrichozetidae Balogh, 1965
- Nesozetidae J. & P. Balogh, 1984
- Oribatulidae Thor, 1929
- Oripodidae Jacot, 1925
- Parapirnodidae Aoki & Ohkubo, 1974
- Pirnodidae Grandjean, 1956
- Protoribatidae J. & P. Balogh, 1984
- Pseudoppiidae Mahunka, 1975
- Scheloribatidae Jacot, 1935
- Symbioribatidae Aoki, 1966
- Tubulozetidae P. Balogh, 1989
