= Liochthonius =

Scientific classification
- Kingdom: Animalia
- Phylum: Arthropoda
- Subphylum: Chelicerata
- Class: Arachnida
- Order: Oribatida
- Family: Brachychthoniidae
- Genus: Liochthonius; Hammen, 1959

Genus of mites

Liochthonius is a genus of beetle mites that belongs to the family Brachychthoniidae. Members of this genus can be found in Europe in regions such as Poland, Switzerland and Norway.

== Taxonomy ==
=== Species ===
This genus currently contains 13 described species. They are listed below:

- Liochthonius andrewi
- Liochthonius alpestris
- Liochthonius australis
- Liochthonius globuliferus
- Liochthonius lapponicus (Trägårdh, 1910)
- Liochthonius muscorum Forsslund, 1964
- Liochthonius occultus W. Niedbała, 1971
- Liochthonius pedunculitis
- Liochthonius perfusorius
- Liochthonius piluiferus
- Liochthonius sellnicki
- Liochthonius stenzkei
- Liochthonius tuxeni
