= Rhysotritia =

Scientific classification
- Kingdom: Animalia
- Phylum: Arthropoda
- Subphylum: Chelicerata
- Class: Arachnida
- Order: Oribatida
- Family: Euphthiracaridae
- Genus: Rhysotritia

Genus of mites

Rhysotritia is a genus of mites in the family Euphthiracaridae.

== Species ==
- Rhysotritia bifurcata Niedbała, 1993
- Rhysotritia brasiliana Mahunka, 1983
- Rhysotritia comteae Mahunka, 1983
- Rhysotritia furcata Bayoumi & Mahunka, 1979
- Rhysotritia penicillata Mahunka, 1982
