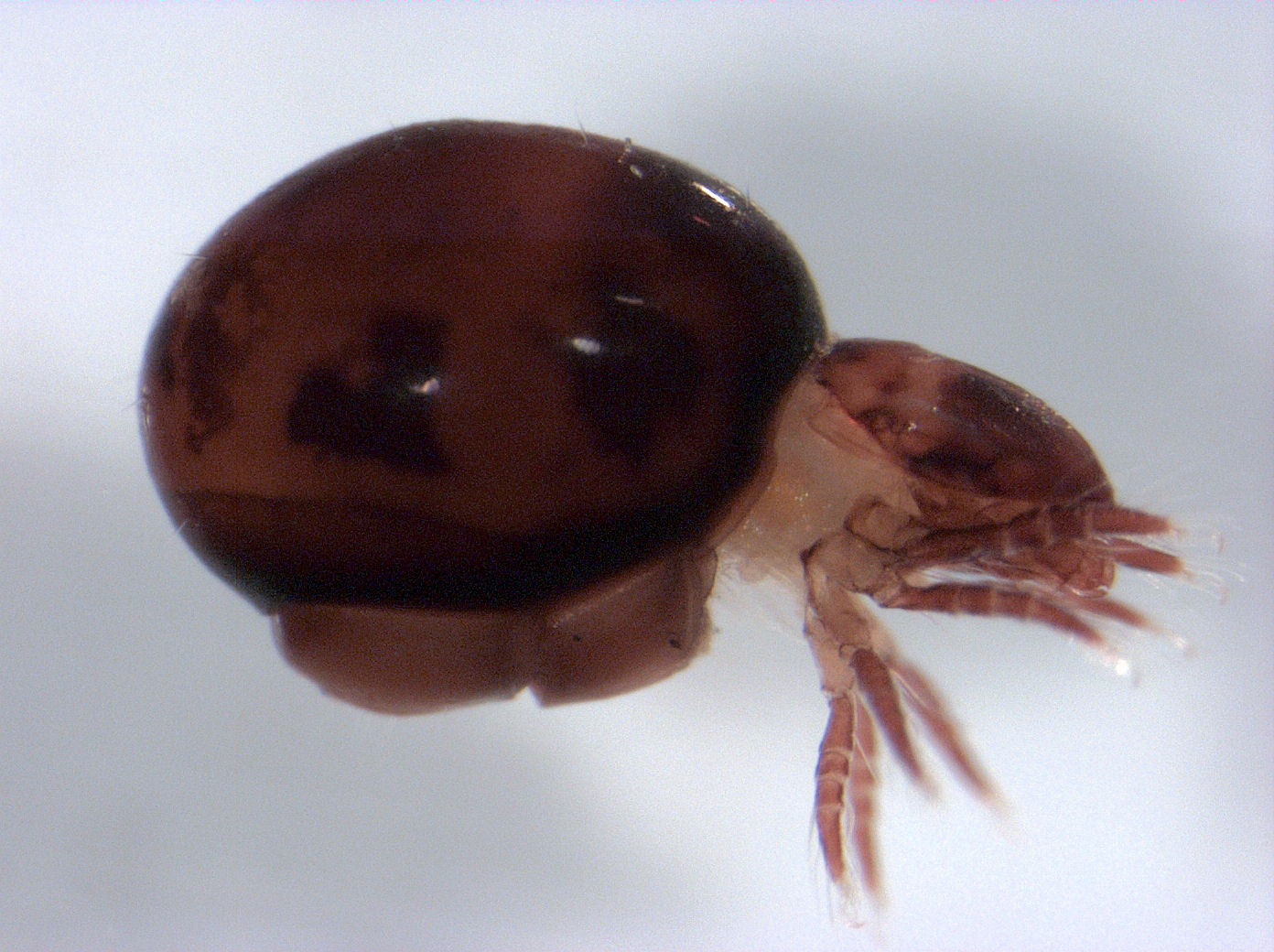

Scientific classification
- Kingdom: Animalia
- Phylum: Arthropoda
- Subphylum: Chelicerata
- Class: Arachnida
- Order: Oribatida
- Superfamily: Phthiracaroidea
- Family: Phthiracaridae; Perty, 1841

Synonyms
- Steganacaridae Niedbala, 1986

= Phthiracaridae =

Family of mites

Phthiracaridae is a family of oribatid mites in the order Oribatida. There are about 7 genera and at least 710 described species in Phthiracaridae.

== Genera ==
- Atropacarus Ewing, 1917
- Hoplophorella Berlese, 1923
- Hoplophthiracarus Jacot, 1933
- Notophthiracarus Ramsay, 1966
- Phthiracarus Perty, 1841
- Rhacaplacarus Niedbala, 1986
- Steganacarus Ewing, 1917
