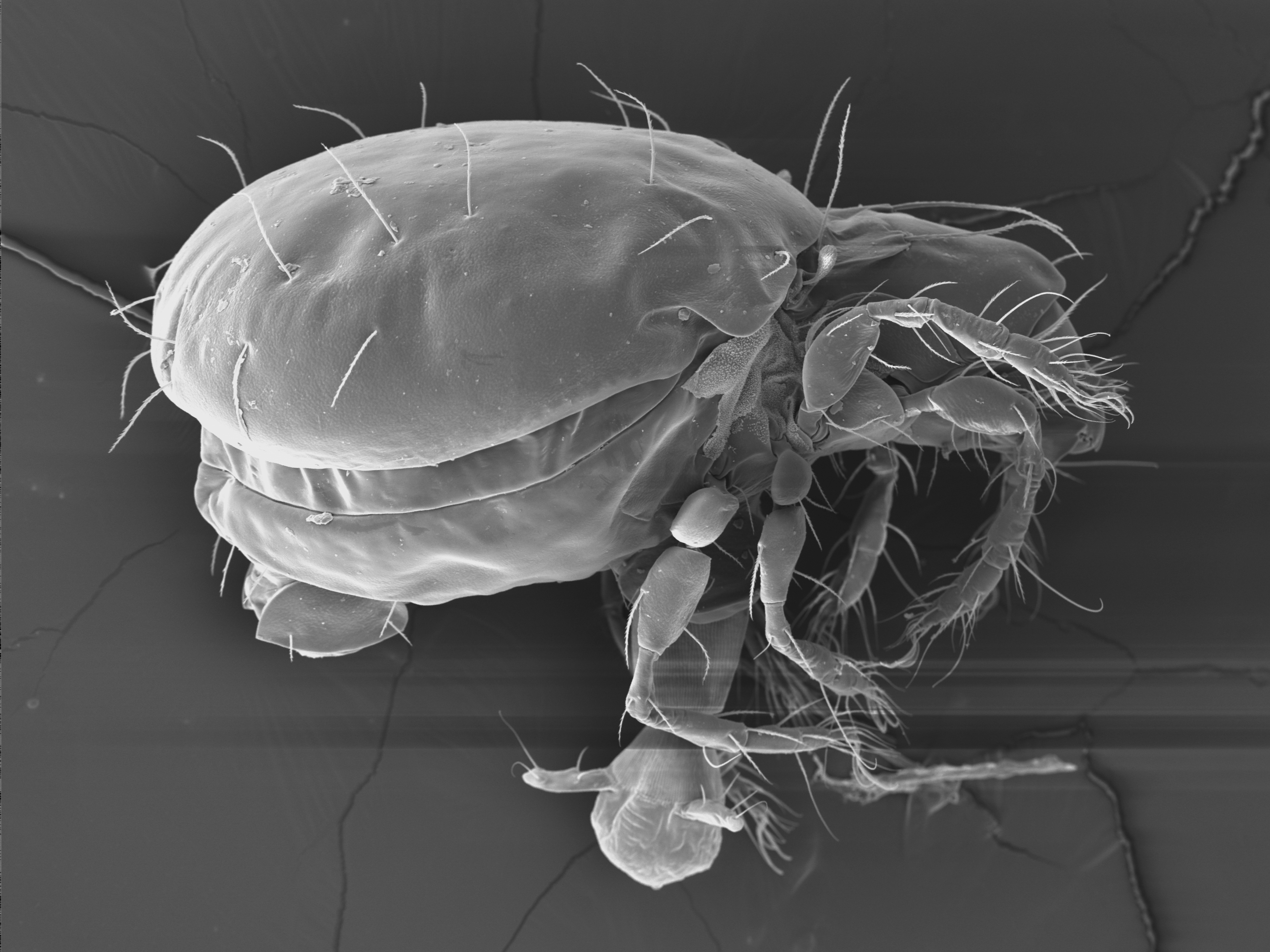
- Scanning electron microscope (SEM) photo of M. petronia

Scientific classification
- Domain: Eukaryota
- Kingdom: Animalia
- Phylum: Arthropoda
- Subphylum: Chelicerata
- Class: Arachnida
- Order: Oribatida
- Family: Maudheimiidae
- Genus: Maudheimia
- Species: M. petronia

Binomial name
- Maudheimia petronia Wallwork, 1962

= Maudheimia petronia =

Species of mite

Maudheimia petronia is a species of oribatid mite belonging to the genus Maudheimia. It can be found in ice-free areas of Victoria Land, Antarctica
