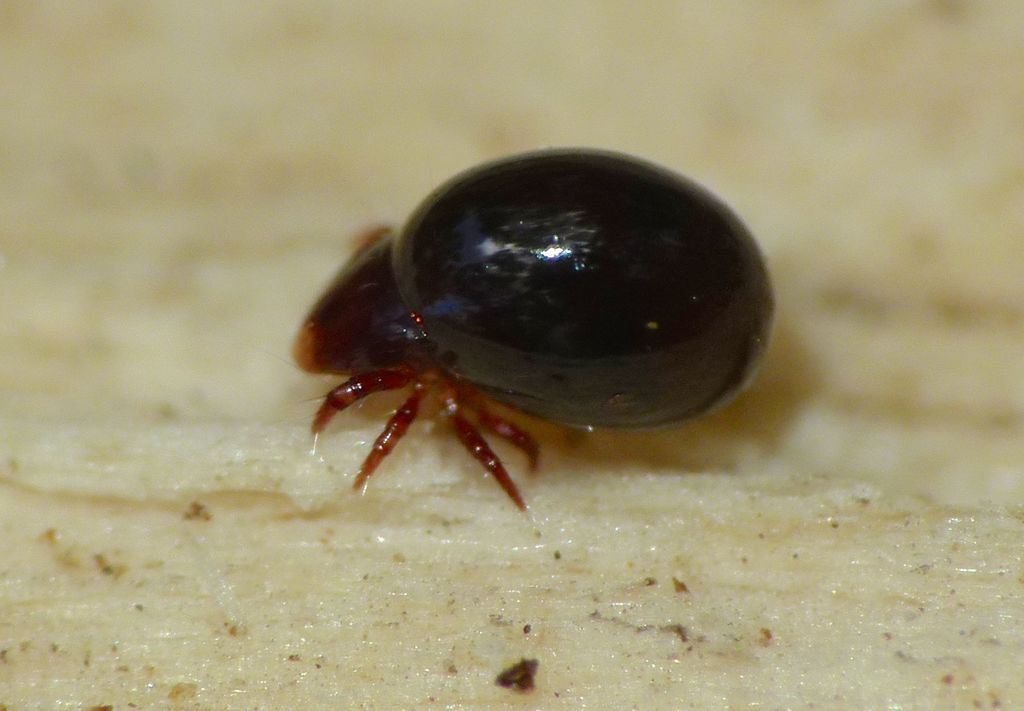
- Oribotritia sp.

Scientific classification
- Kingdom: Animalia
- Phylum: Arthropoda
- Subphylum: Chelicerata
- Class: Arachnida
- Order: Oribatida
- Family: Oribotritiidae
- Genus: Oribotritia

= Oribotritia =

Oribotritia Temporal range: Palaeogene–present

Genus of mites

Oribotritia is a genus of mites in the family Oribotritiidae.

== Species ==
- Oribotritia contortula Niedbała, 1993
- Oribotritia contraria Niedbała, 1993
- Oribotritia teretis Niedbała, 1993
