= Bolkiah (mite) =

Scientific classification
- Kingdom: Animalia
- Phylum: Arthropoda
- Subphylum: Chelicerata
- Class: Arachnida
- Order: Oribatida
- Family: Haplozetidae
- Genus: Bolkiah; Mahunka, 1997

Genus of mites

Bolkiah is a genus of arachnids in the family Haplozetidae. There is at least one described species in Bolkiah, B. hauseri.
