= Cepheidae =

Cepheidae may refer to:

- Cepheidae (cnidarian), a family of jellyfish in the order Rhizostomeae
- Cepheidae (mite), a family of mites in the order Sarcoptiformes
