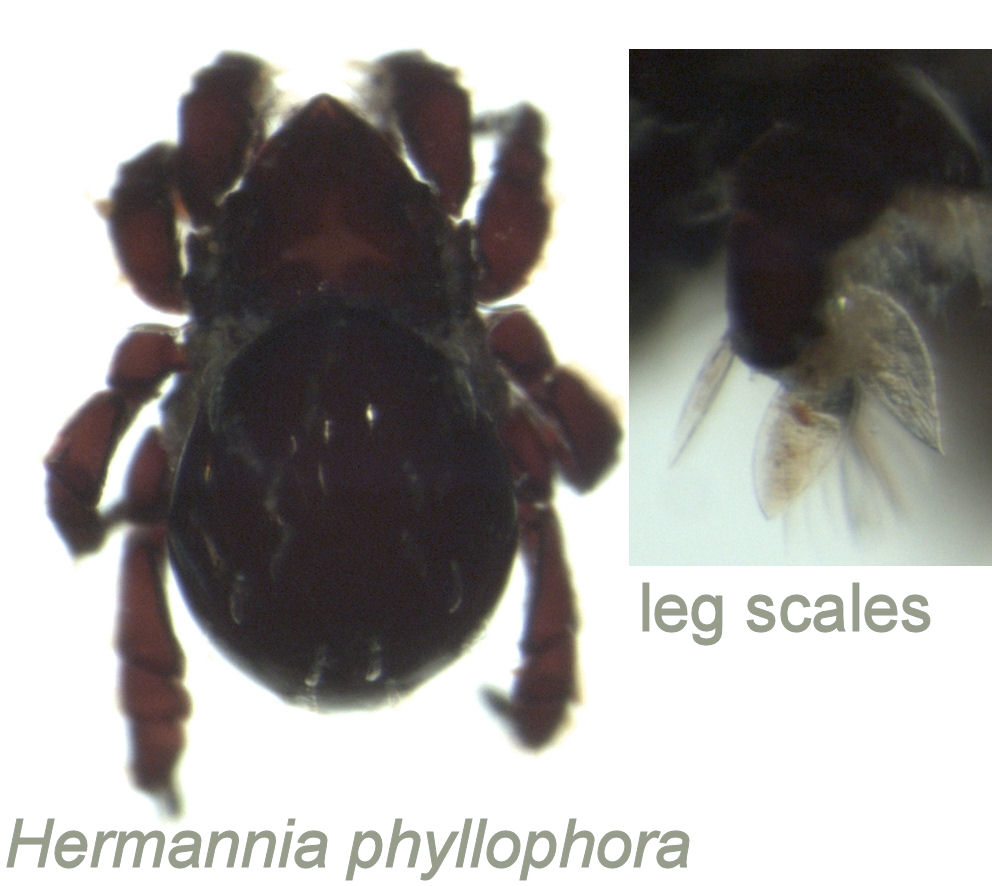
- Hermannia phyllophora

Scientific classification
- Kingdom: Animalia
- Phylum: Arthropoda
- Subphylum: Chelicerata
- Class: Arachnida
- Order: Oribatida
- Family: Hermanniidae
- Genus: Hermannia; Nicolet, 1855, (cf. Sellnick, 1928, Tierw. Mittel., 4(3) (IX):18; Woas, 1981, Andrias, 1: 7; Woas, 1992, Andrias, 9: 175.)

= Hermannia (mite) =

Genus of mites

Hermannia is a genus of mites that includes several dozen described species. Typically they dwell in moss, feeding partly on fungi.
