= Allodamaeus =

Scientific classification
- Domain: Eukaryota
- Kingdom: Animalia
- Phylum: Arthropoda
- Subphylum: Chelicerata
- Class: Arachnida
- Order: Oribatida
- Family: Plateremaeidae
- Genus: Allodamaeus; Banks, 1947

Genus of mites

Allodamaeus is a genus of oribatids in the family Plateremaeidae. There are at least 2 described species in Allodamaeus.

== Species ==
- Allodamaeus coralgablensis Paschoal, 1987
- Allodamaeus ewingi Banks, 1947
