= Scheloribatidae =

Scheloribatidae Temporal range: Palaeogene–present

Scientific classification
- Kingdom: Animalia
- Phylum: Arthropoda
- Subphylum: Chelicerata
- Class: Arachnida
- Order: Oribatida
- Superfamily: Oripodoidea
- Family: Scheloribatidae; Jacot, 1935

Family of mites

Scheloribatidae is a family of mites and ticks in the order Sarcoptiformes. There are at least 20 genera and 320 described species in Scheloribatidae.

== Genera ==
- Annobonzetes Pérez-Íñigo, 1983
- Coronibatula Mahunka, 1988
- Cosmobates Balogh, 1959
- Euscheloribates Kunst, 1958
- Fijibates Hammer, 1971
- Fissurobates Balogh & Mahunka, 1969
- Grandjeanobates Ramsay, 1967
- Hammerabates Balogh, 1970
- Muliercula Coetzer, 1968
- Nannerlia Coetzer, 1968
- Pachygena Hammer, 1972
- Perscheloribates Hammer, 1973
- Planobates Hammer, 1973
- Rhabdoribates Aoki, 1967
- Samoabates Hammer, 1973
- Scheloribates Berlese, 1908
- Scheloribatoides Mahunka, 1988
- Similobates Mahunka, 1982
- Striatobates Hammer, 1973
- Topobates Grandjean, 1958
