= Linonian Society =

Secret society at Yale University, US

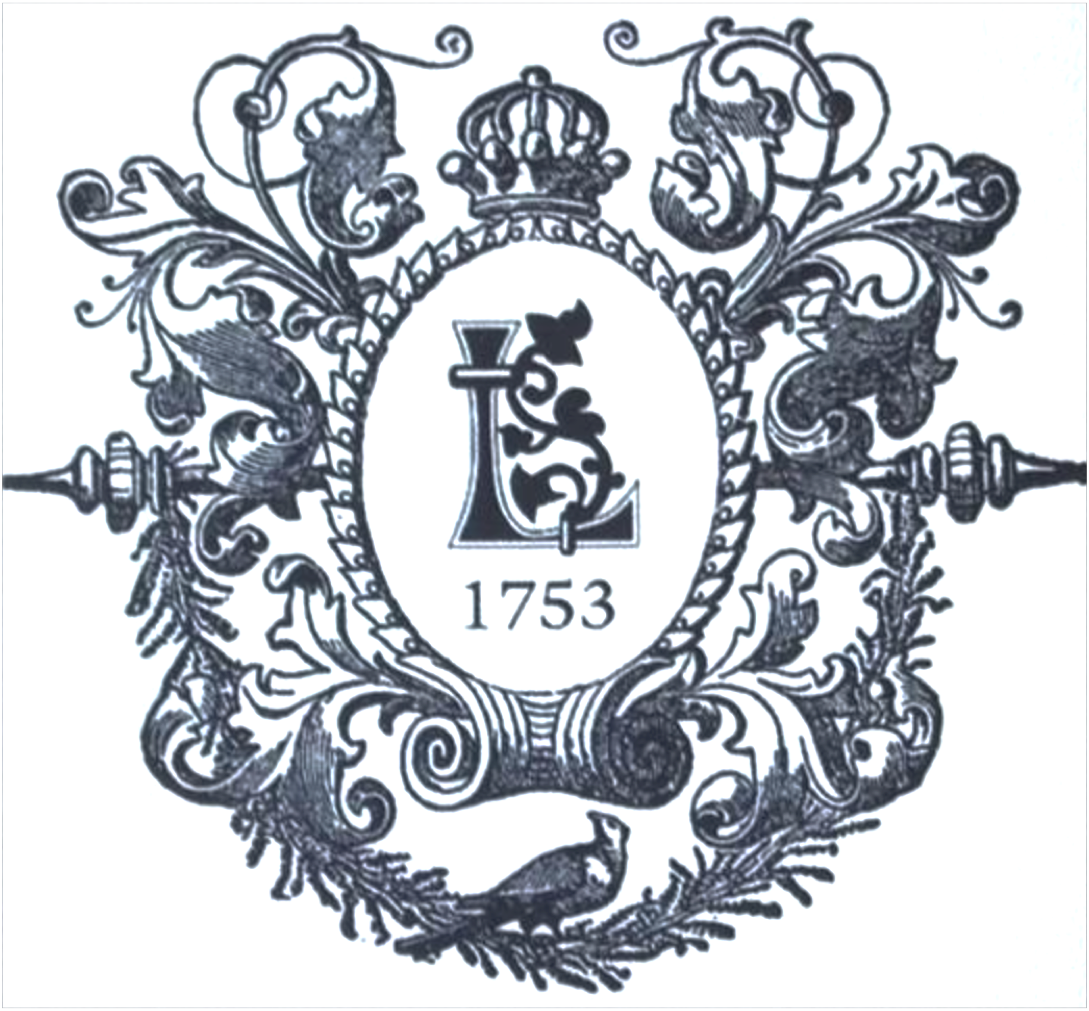
- Founded: September 12, 1753; 272 years ago Yale University
- Type: Secret
- Affiliation: Independent
- Status: Active
- Emphasis: Debate
- Scope: Local
- Motto: Amicitia Concordia Soli Noscimus
- Colors: Navy and Pink
- Chapters: 1
- Headquarters: New Haven, Connecticut; United States

Linonia, founded in 1753, is the second-oldest society at Yale College and the oldest surviving literary and debating society, outlasting its short-lived predecessor, Crotonia. Today, Linonia operates as a secret society at Yale, continuing the centuries-old tradition of promoting friendship and social intercourse.

Members of the society are known as "Linonians".

== History ==
Linonia was founded on September 12, 1753, as Yale College's second oldest literary and debating society, after its short-lived predecessor Crotonia, founded in 1738. According to Yale: A History, participation in Linonia was the first non-athletic organized activity at Yale.

Linonia inspired many imitations, notably its rival society Brothers in Unity (1768) and Calliope (1819). By the late eighteenth century, membership in Linonia or Brothers was a defining tradition for all incoming freshmen. By the end of the Civil War, the social dominance of Linonia and Brothers began to wane, and in 1871, both societies donated their extensive book collections to the Yale Library. Linonia inspired the creation of the Cambridge Union and Oxford Union, which later served as models for the Yale Political Union. The founding of Skull and Bones, the original senior society, was directly tied to a dispute between Linonia, Brothers and Calliope over the Phi Beta Kappa awards.

Linonia was reconstituted multiple times throughout the 20th century, with its current form taking the shape of Yale's secret societies.

Each year, twenty students are carefully selected from Yale Law School, Yale Graduate School, Yale School of Management, and Yale's senior undergraduate class, making Linonia the only Yale secret society known to tap beyond the undergraduate level. Each new member has to be confirmed by unanimous vote among Linonia members.

Linonia participates in Yale's tap night during the second week of April. Unlike many secret societies whose focus is the members' biographies, Linonia meetings often involve debate on intellectual and political topics.

== Symbols ==
The society's motto is Amicitia Concordia Soli Noscimus. Its colors are navy and pink.

== Linonia and Sterling Memorial Library ==
Linonia maintained an extensive collection of works that Yale faculty deemed unsuitable for formal instruction, as the university did not introduce English literature into its curriculum until the late nineteenth century. In 1871, Linonia and Brothers in Unity donated their literary collections to Yale, which were eventually housed in Sterling Memorial Library upon its opening in 1931. This contribution is commemorated in the Linonia & Brothers Reading Room (L&B Room), a dedicated space within the library. The reading room now holds the Linonia and Brothers (L&B) collection, a travel collection, a medieval history collection, and a selection of recently acquired books. The L&B Reading Room underwent renovations during the COVID-19 pandemic and officially reopened on April 15, 2024.

The room was originally conceived as a browsable book collection, evoking the atmosphere of a refined private library or a grand living room. Over the years, generations of Yalies have regarded it as a beloved space for studying, reading, relaxing, or napping on its signature green leather couches.

Architecturally, the Tudor-style reading room features book-lined alcoves, an intricately detailed plaster ceiling, and Gothic windows that offer a view of Selin Courtyard. Access to the space was for men only until 1963 when University Librarian James T. Babb announced it would open “to the ladies” to recognize “the growing status of women in the Graduate School at Yale."

Linonia is also commemorated with courtyards in Branford College, honoring its historical contributions to Yale’s intellectual and literary traditions.

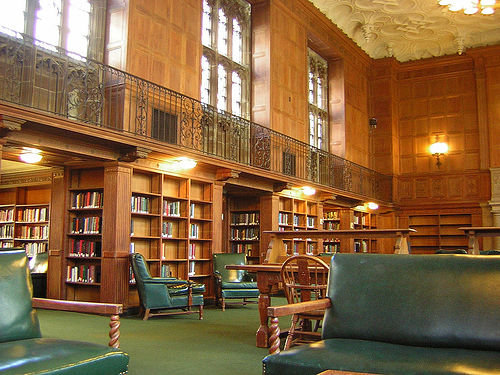
Linonia & Brothers Reading Room, Sterling Memorial Library, Yale

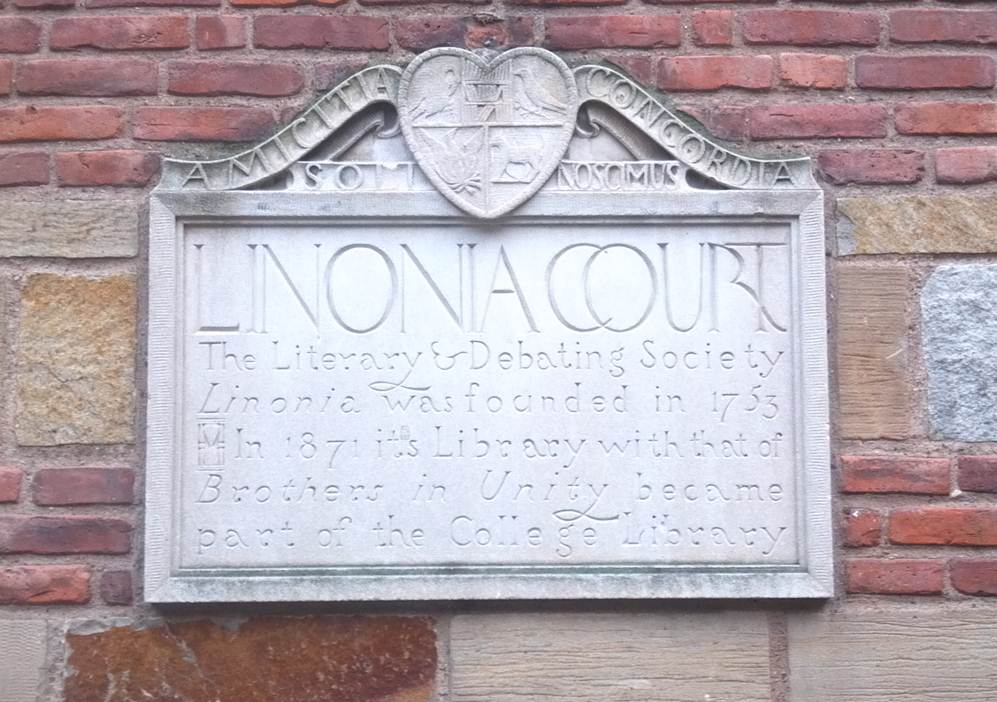
Linonia Court, Branford College, Yale

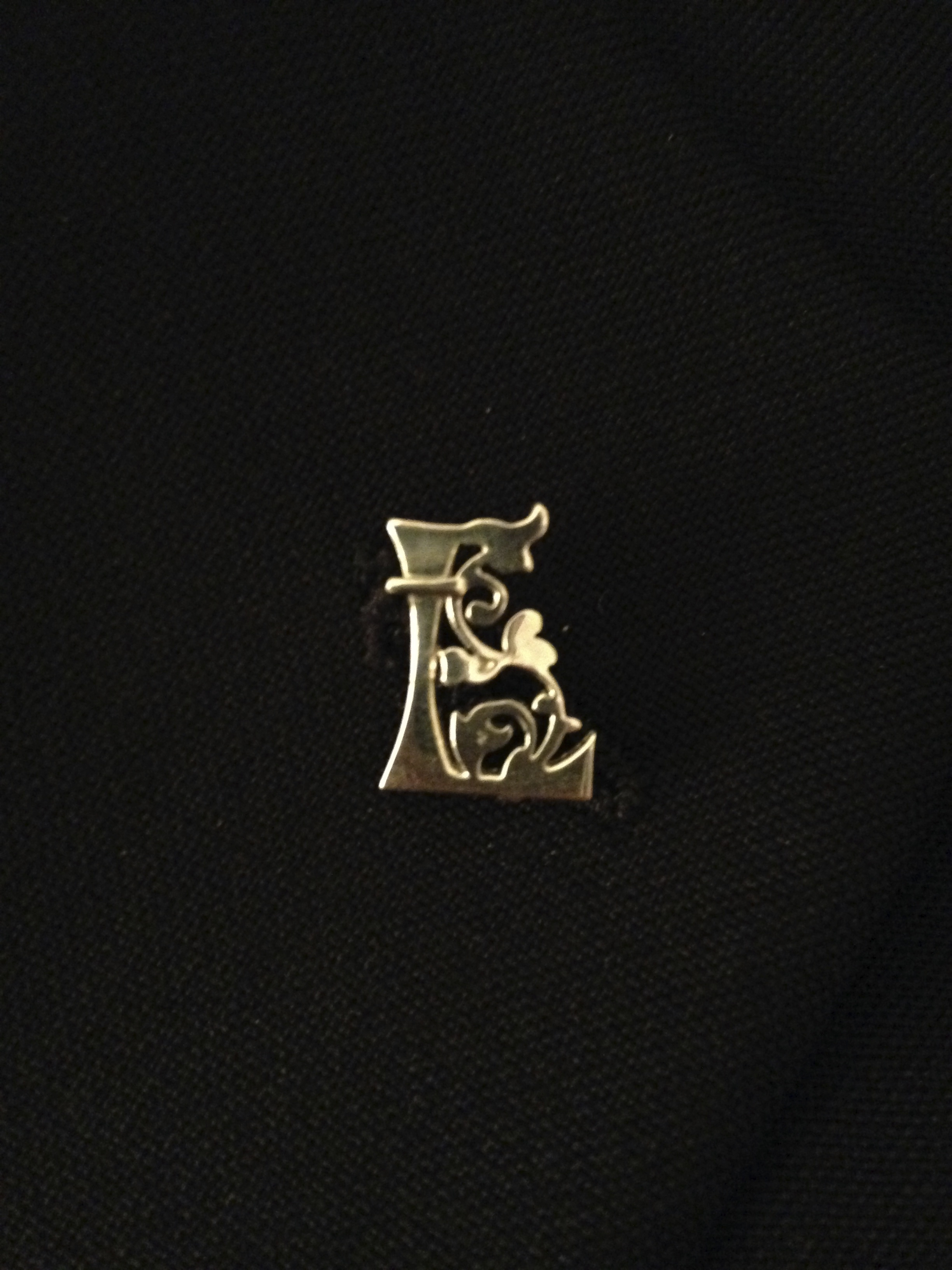
Linonian Society Pin in Silver

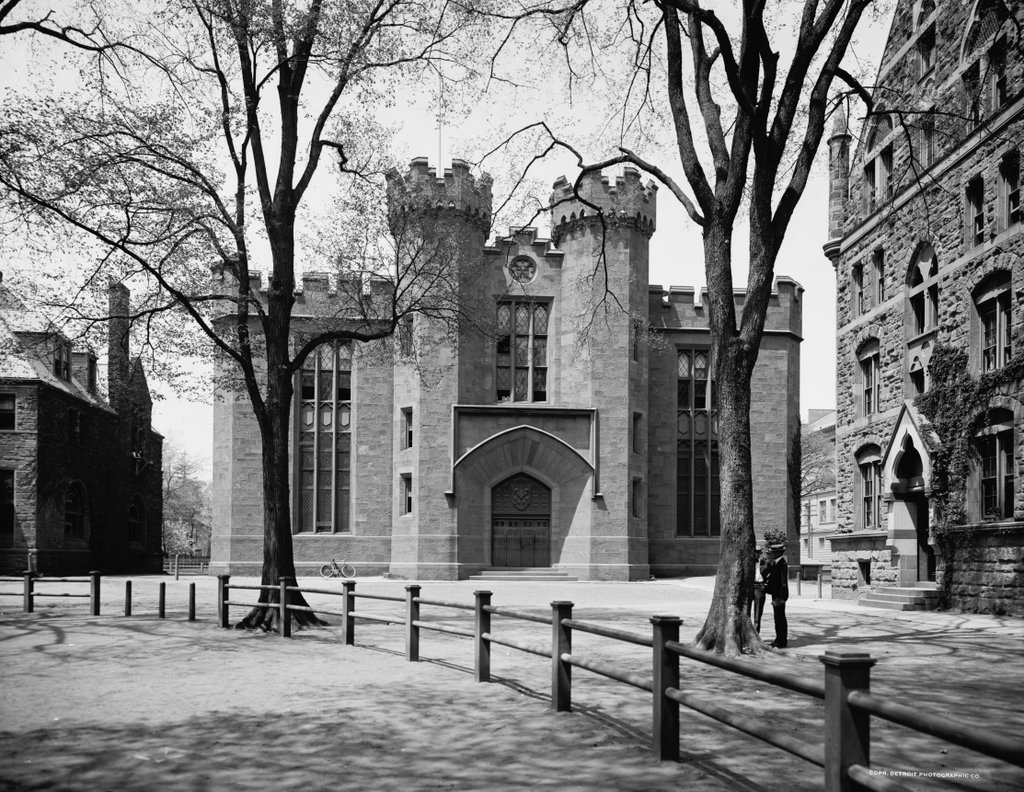
Alumni Hall, erected at the joint expense of Linonia and Yale College in 1853, served as a permanent hall for its members.

== Notable members (pre-millennium) ==
Name	Class Year	Profile
Timothy Dwight IV	1767	American academic and educator, Congregationalist minister, theologian, and author. He was the eighth president of Yale College (1795–1817).
Abraham Baldwin	1772	American politician, Patriot, and Founding Father from the U.S. state of Georgia. Baldwin was a Georgia representative in the Continental Congress and served in the United States House of Representatives and Senate after the adoption of the Constitution. Baldwin was the founding father of the University of Georgia, the first state-chartered public institution of higher education in the United States, and served as its first president.
Nathan Hale	1773	American patriot, spy for General George Washington, and the state hero of Connecticut.
James Hillhouse	1773	American lawyer, real estate developer, and politician from New Haven, Connecticut. He represented Connecticut in both the U.S. House and Senate.
Eli Whitney	1789	American inventor best known for inventing the cotton gin.
Jeremiah Day	1789	American academic, Congregational minister, and President of Yale College (1817–1846).
James Fenimore Cooper	1806	Prolific and popular American writer of the early 19th century, author of Last of the Mohicans.
Henry Leavitt Ellsworth	1810	Yale-educated attorney who became the first Commissioner of the U.S. Patent Office, where he encouraged innovation by inventors Samuel F.B. Morse and Samuel Colt. Ellsworth also served as the second president of the Aetna Insurance Company. He was also a major donor to Yale College, a commissioner to Indian tribes on the western frontier, and the founder of what became the United States Department of Agriculture.
Roger Sherman Baldwin	1811	American lawyer involved in the Amistad case, who later became the 32nd Governor of Connecticut and a United States Senator.
Asa Thurston	1818	First American Christian missionary to the Hawaiian Islands.
Nathaniel Parker Willis	1827	American author, poet, and editor who worked with several notable American writers including Edgar Allan Poe and Henry Wadsworth Longfellow. He became the highest-paid magazine writer of his day.
Frederick Augustus Porter Barnard	1828	Classical and English scholar, mathematician, physicist, chemist, and advocate for women's higher education. He was the tenth president of Columbia University.
Noah Porter	1831	American academic, philosopher, author, lexicographer, and President of Yale College (1871–1886).
Ebenezer Kingsbury Hunt	1833	Prominent physician in Hartford, Connecticut. The E.K. Hunt Chair of Anatomy at Yale University is named after him.
William M. Evarts	1837	American lawyer and statesman who served as U.S. Secretary of State, U.S. Attorney General, and U.S. Senator from New York.
Josiah Whitney	1839	American geologist, professor of geology at Harvard University, and chief of the California Geological Survey. Mount Whitney and Whitney Glacier were named in his honor.
Joseph Gibson Hoyt	1840	First chancellor and professor of Greek at Washington University in St. Louis (then named Washington Institute in St. Louis) from 1858 to 1862.
Timothy Dwight V	1849	American academic, educator, Congregational minister, and President of Yale College (1886–1898). Under his leadership, Yale developed into a university.
Daniel Coit Gilman	1852	Founder of the Sheffield Scientific School at Yale College, early president of the University of California, first president of Johns Hopkins University, and founding president of the Carnegie Institution. He was also a co-founder of the Russell Trust Association, which administers the business affairs of Yale's Skull and Bones society.
Andrew Dickson White	1853	U.S. diplomat, historian, and educator, co-founder of Cornell University.
Chauncey Mitchell Depew	1856	Attorney for Cornelius Vanderbilt's railroad empire, president of the New York Central Railroad System, and U.S. Senator from New York (1899-1911).
Brinley D. Sleight	1858	Newspaper editor, member of the New York State Assembly
Francis Miles Finch	1859	American judge, poet, and academic associated with the early years of Cornell University. Author of the famous poem "The Blue and the Gray".
Ehrman Syme Nadal	1864	American journalist and writer
Elisha Jay Edwards	1870	Investigative journalist and financial reporter known for exposing President Grover Cleveland's secret cancer surgery.
Walter Camp	1875	American football player, coach, and sports writer, known as the "Father of American Football".
William Howard Taft	1878	President of the United States (1909-1913), Chief Justice of the United States (1921-1930), Judge on the Cincinnati Superior Court, Solicitor General of the United States, Judge on the United States Court of Appeals for the Sixth Circuit, Governor-General of the Philippines, and Secretary of War under President Theodore Roosevelt. In the late 19th century, Taft advocated for and attempted a revival of Linonia. He is also a member of Skull and Bones.
Dick Celeste	1959	64th Governor of Ohio, U.S. Ambassador to India, and 12th President of Colorado College.
Les Aspin	1960	18th U.S. Secretary of Defense and representative for Wisconsin's 1st Congressional District.

== See also ==
- Collegiate secret societies in North America
