= Microtritia =

Scientific classification
- Kingdom: Animalia
- Phylum: Arthropoda
- Subphylum: Chelicerata
- Class: Arachnida
- Order: Oribatida
- Family: Euphthiracaridae
- Genus: Microtritia; Märkel, 1964

Genus of mites

Microtritia is a genus of mites in the family Euphthiracaridae.

== Species ==
- Microtritia contraria Niedbała, 1993
- Microtritia glabrata Niedbała, 1993
- Microtritia incisa Märkel, 1964
- Microtritia stria Liu & Zhang, 2014
- Microtritia tropica Märkel, 1964
