= Notophthiracarus =

Scientific classification
- Kingdom: Animalia
- Phylum: Arthropoda
- Subphylum: Chelicerata
- Class: Arachnida
- Order: Oribatida
- Family: Phthiracaridae
- Genus: Notophthiracarus; Ramsay, 1966

Species
- See text

Genus of mites

Notophthiracarus is a genus of mites in the family Steganacaridae.

== Species ==
- Notophthiracarus claviger Niedbała, 1993
- Notophthiracarus mahunkai Niedbała, 1987
