= Mochloribatula =

Mochloribatula Temporal range: Neogene–present

Scientific classification
- Domain: Eukaryota
- Kingdom: Animalia
- Phylum: Arthropoda
- Subphylum: Chelicerata
- Class: Arachnida
- Order: Oribatida
- Family: Mochlozetidae
- Genus: Mochloribatula; Mahunka, 1978

Genus of mites

Mochloribatula is a genus of mites in the family Mochlozetidae. There are about eight described species in Mochloribatula.

== Species ==
These eight species belong to the genus Mochloribatula:

- Mochloribatula bahamensis Norton, 1983
- Mochloribatula calycifera Mahunka, 1985
- Mochloribatula depilis (Ewing, 1909)
- Mochloribatula floridana (Banks, 1904)
- Mochloribatula grandjeani Mahunka, 1978
- Mochloribatula metzi Norton, 1983
- Mochloribatula multiporosa Mahunka, 1978
- Mochloribatula texana (Ewing, 1909)
