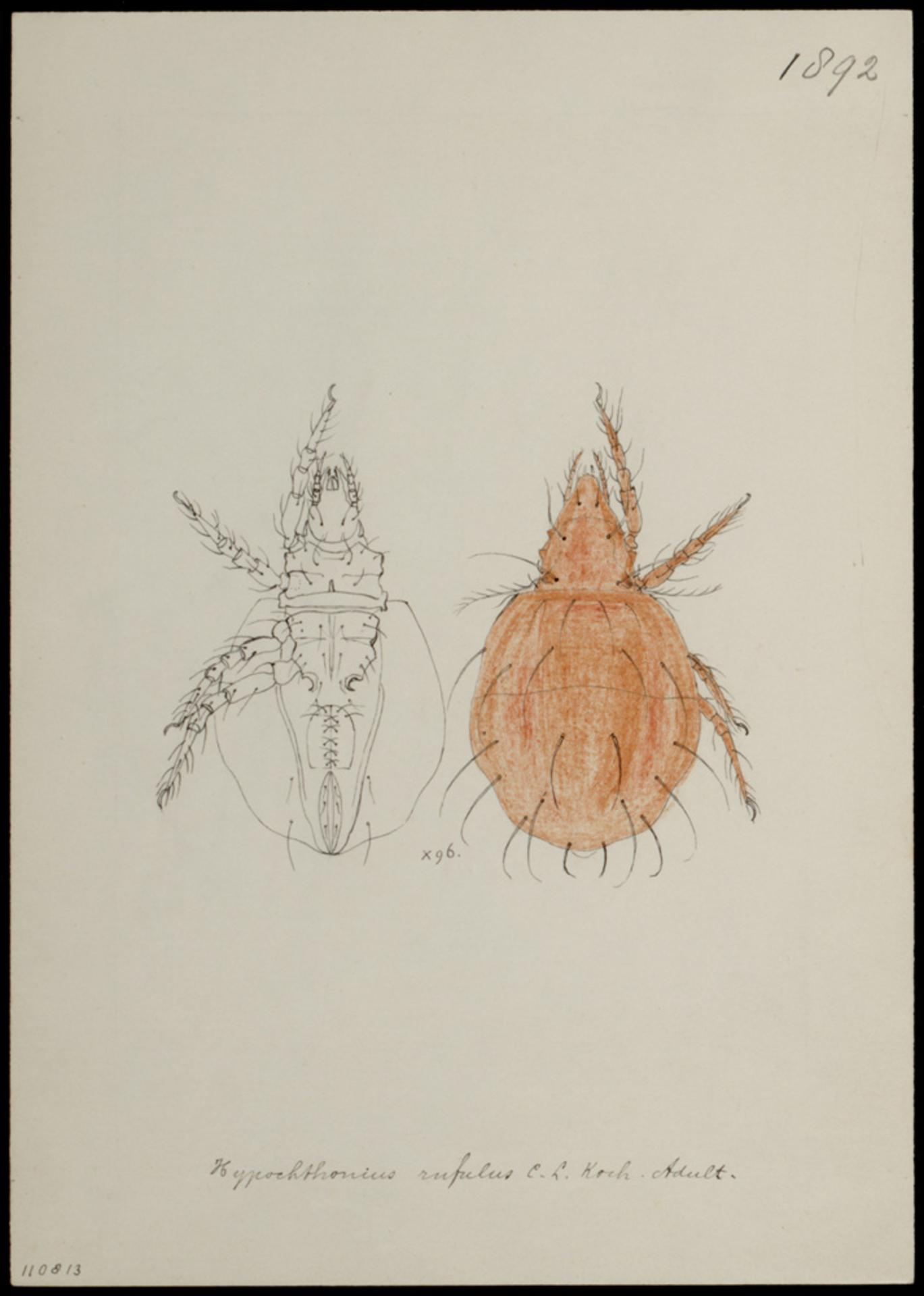
- Hypochthonius

Scientific classification
- Kingdom: Animalia
- Phylum: Arthropoda
- Subphylum: Chelicerata
- Class: Arachnida
- Order: Oribatida
- Suborder: Enarthronota; Grandjean, 1947

= Enarthronota =

Enarthronota Temporal range: Devonian–present

Suborder of mites

Enarthronota is a suborder of mites in the order Oribatida. There are about 14 families and more than 450 described species in Enarthronota.

== Families ==
These 14 families belong to the suborder Enarthronota:

- Arborichthoniidae J. & P. Balogh, 1992
- Atopochthoniidae Grandjean, 1949
- Brachychthoniidae Thor, 1934
- Cosmochthoniidae Grandjean, 1947 (cosmochthoniids)
- Eniochthoniidae Grandjean, 1947
- Haplochthoniidae Hammen, 1959
- Heterochthoniidae Grandjean, 1954
- Hypochthoniidae Berlese, 1910
- Nothridae Berlese, 1896
- Pediculochelidae Lavoipierre, 1946
- Phyllochthoniidae Travé, 1967
- Protoplophoridae Ewing, 1917
- Pterochthoniidae Grandjean, 1950
- Sphaerochthoniidae Grandjean, 1947
