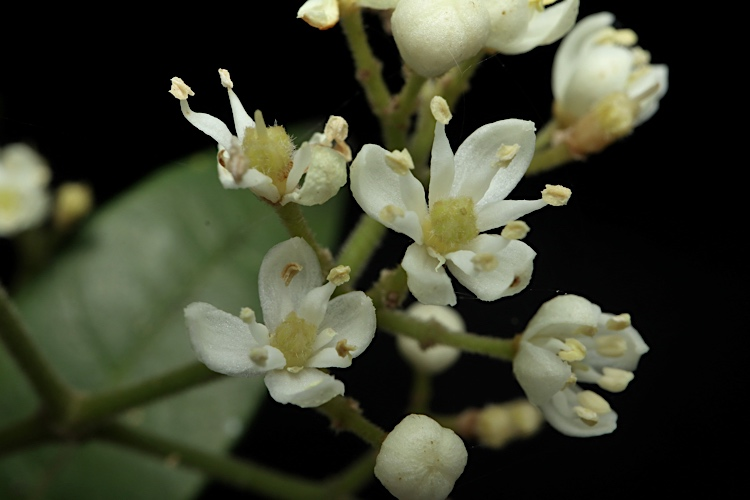
- In the ANBG

Scientific classification
- Kingdom: Plantae
- Clade: Tracheophytes
- Clade: Angiosperms
- Clade: Eudicots
- Clade: Rosids
- Order: Sapindales
- Family: Rutaceae
- Genus: Bouchardatia
- Species: B. neurococca

Binomial name
- Bouchardatia neurococca (F.Muell.) Baill.

Synonyms
- Bouchardatia australis Baill.; Euodia neurococca F.Muell.; Melicope neurococca (F.Muell.) Benth.

= Bouchardatia neurococca =

Union nut

Species of flowering plant

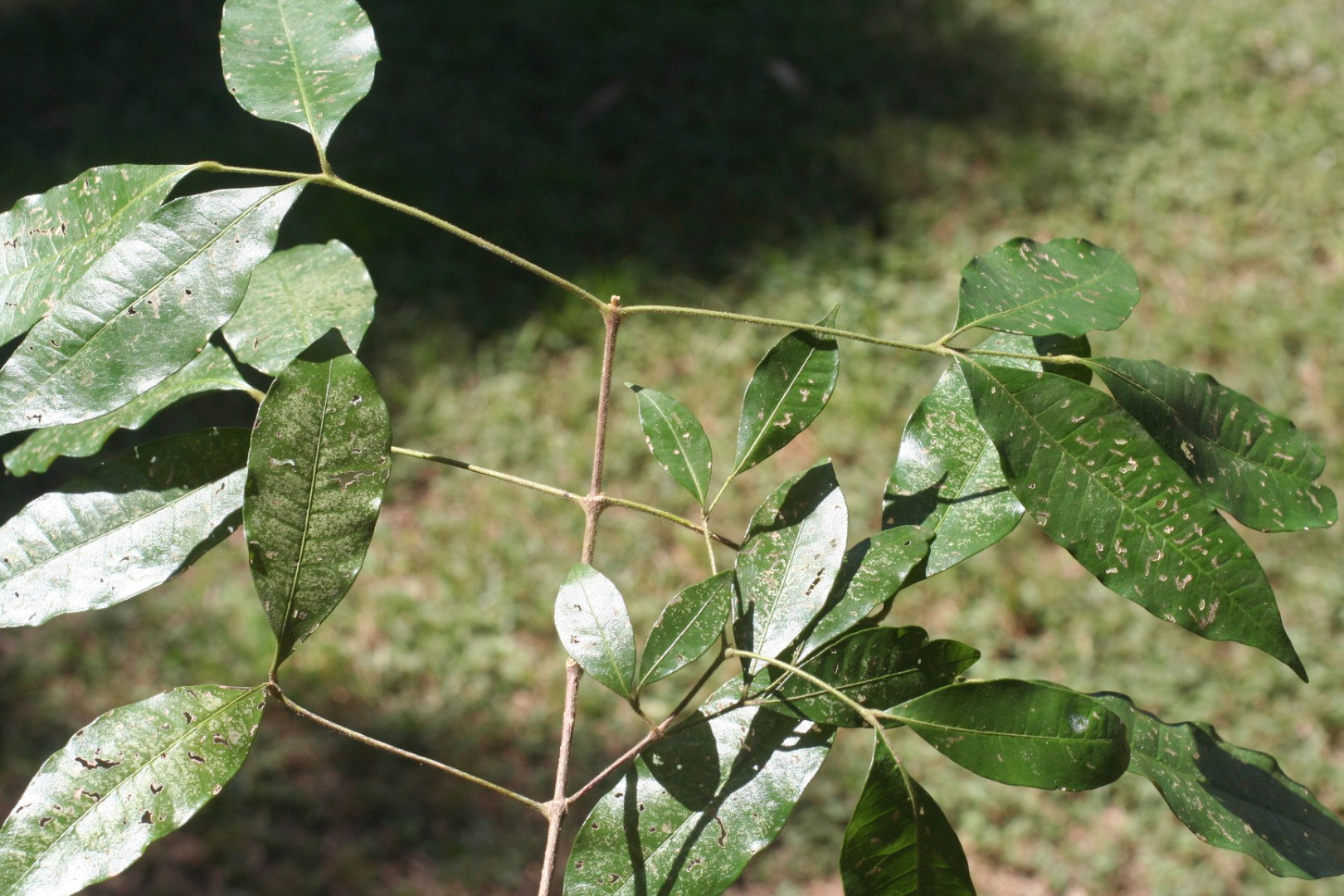
Leaves, near Mount Mellum

Bouchardatia neurococca, commonly known as union nut, is a species of small rainforest tree that is endemic to eastern Australia. It has pinnate leaves with three or five narrow elliptical leaflets, white flowers arranged in panicles, and oval follicles.

== Description ==
Bouchardatia neurococca is a tree that typically grows to a height of 8 m (26 ft) and has smooth greyish brown to dark brown bark. The leaves are arranged in opposite pairs and pinnate with three or five narrow elliptical to lance-shaped leaves with the narrow end towards the base. The leaves are 100–200 mm (3.9–7.9 in) long on a petiole 20–50 mm (0.79–1.97 in) long, the leaflets 55–130 mm (2.2–5.1 in) long and 10–50 mm (0.39–1.97 in) wide. The upper surface of the leaves is glossy dark green, the lower surface yellowish green and there are small, hairy domatia. The flowers are arranged in panicles 50–100 mm (2.0–3.9 in) long, on the ends of branchlets or in leaf axils, with four sepals 0.8–1.5 mm (0.031–0.059 in) long, four white petals 4–5 mm (0.16–0.20 in) long and eight stamens that alternate in length. The fruit is an ovoid follicle 8–10 mm (0.31–0.39 in) long.

== Taxonomy ==
The union nut was first formally described in 1858 by Ferdinand von Mueller who gave it the name Euodia neurococca and published the description in Fragmenta phytographiae Australiae. In 1870, Henri Ernest Baillon changed the name to Bouchardatia neurococca in the journal Adansonia.

== Distribution and habitat ==
Bouchardatia neurococca grows in subtropical and dry rainforest from near sea level to an altitude of 730 m (2,400 ft) and from Mackay in central-eastern Queensland to the Richmond River in north-eastern New South Wales.
