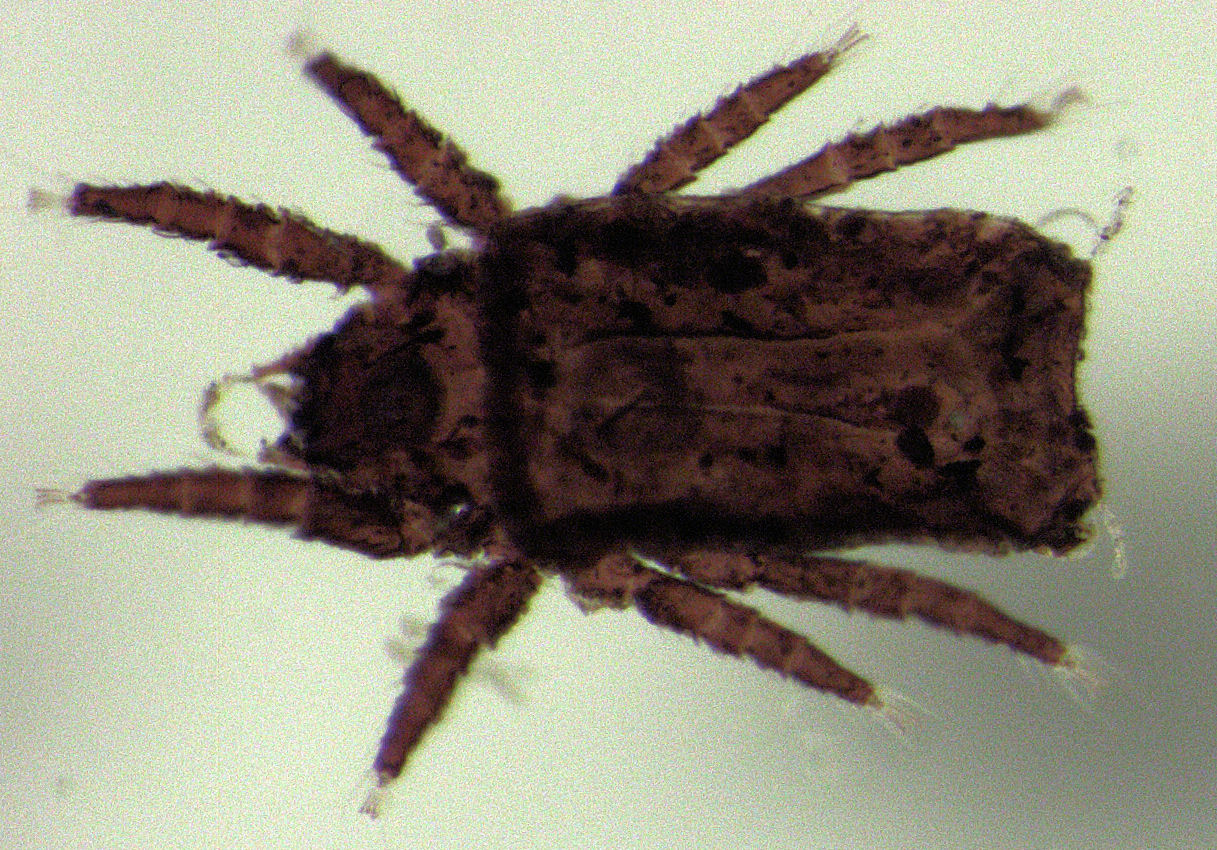

Scientific classification
- Kingdom: Animalia
- Phylum: Arthropoda
- Subphylum: Chelicerata
- Class: Arachnida
- Order: Oribatida
- Suborder: Desmonomata
- Family: Camisiidae; Oudemans, 1900

= Camisiidae =

Camisiidae Temporal range: Cretaceous–present

Family of mites

Camisiidae is a family of oribatids in the order Oribatida. There are at least 3 genera and 70 described species in Camisiidae.

== Genera ==
- Austronothrus Hammer, 1966
- Camisia Heyden, 1826
- Heminothrus Berlese, 1913
