= Vata gracilipalpis =

Scientific classification
- Kingdom: Animalia
- Phylum: Arthropoda
- Clade: Pancrustacea
- Class: Insecta
- Order: Coleoptera
- Suborder: Adephaga
- Family: Cicindelidae
- Genus: Vata
- Species: V. gracilipalpis

Binomial name
- Vata gracilipalpis W. Horn, 1909

Synonyms
- Prothyma gracilipalpis (W.Horn, 1909)

Species of beetle

Vata gracilipalpis is a species of tiger beetle. It is endemic to New Caledonia.

Vata gracilipalpis measure 7.4–8.6 mm (0.29–0.34 in) in length. They are brownish-black in color and probably nocturnal or at least crepuscular.
