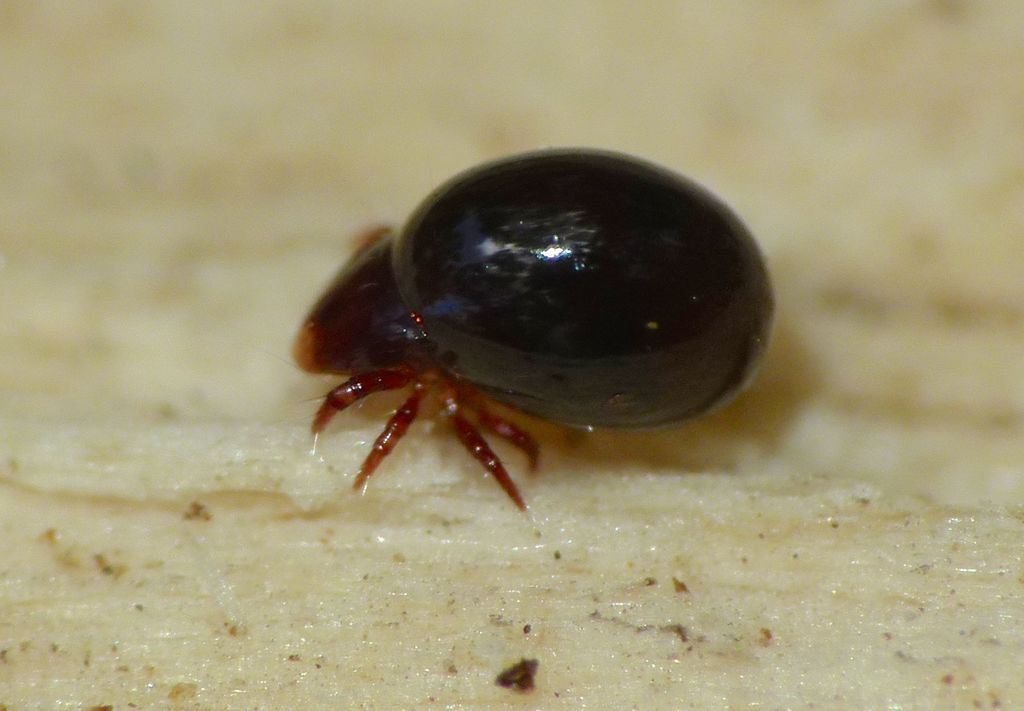
- Oribotritia

Scientific classification
- Kingdom: Animalia
- Phylum: Arthropoda
- Subphylum: Chelicerata
- Class: Arachnida
- Order: Oribatida
- Family: Oribotritiidae; Grandjean, 1954

= Oribotritiidae =

Oribotritiidae Temporal range: Palaeogene–present

Family of mites

Oribotritiidae is a family of mites in the order Oribatida.

== Genera ==
- Oribotritia
