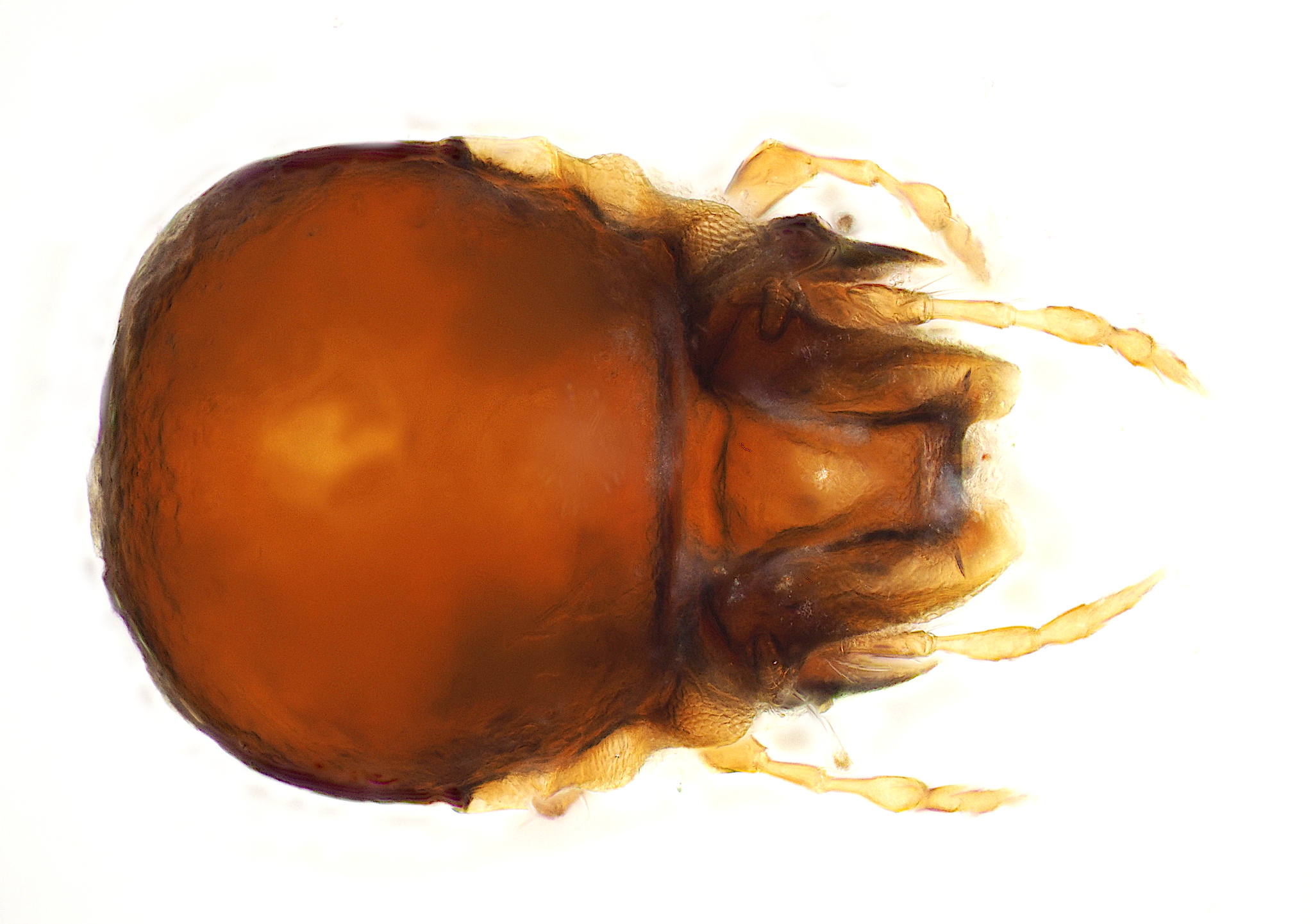
- Sadocepheus sp.

Scientific classification
- Kingdom: Animalia
- Phylum: Arthropoda
- Subphylum: Chelicerata
- Class: Arachnida
- Order: Oribatida
- Family: Compactozetidae; Luxton, 1988

Synonyms
- Cepheidae

= Compactozetidae =

Family of mites

Compactozetidae is a family of mites belonging to the order Oribatida. The family is also known in academic literature as Cepheidae, a name shared with a family of edible jellyfish.

== Genera ==
Sources:

- Cepheus Koch, 1835
- Compactozetes Hammer, 1966
- Conoppia Berlese, 1908
- Eupterotegaeus Berlese, 1916
- Hamotegeus Balogh & Mahunka, 1969
- Hypocepheus Krivolusky, 1971
- Ommatocepheus Berlese, 1913
- Oribatodes Banks, 1895
- Pilocepheus Pérez-Íñigo, 1992
- Protocepheus Jacot, 1928
- Reticulocepheus Vasiliu & Calugar, 1977
- Sadocepheus Aoki, 1965
- Sphodrocepheus Woolley & Higgins, 1963
- Tereticepheus Bernini, 1990
- Tikizetes Hammer, 1967
- Tritegeus Berlese, 1913
