= Baloghiella (mite) =

Scientific classification
- Kingdom: Animalia
- Phylum: Arthropoda
- Subphylum: Chelicerata
- Class: Arachnida
- Order: Oribatida
- Family: Haplozetidae
- Genus: Baloghiella; Bulanova-Zachvatkina, 1960

Genus of mites

Baloghiella is a genus of arachnids in the family Haplozetidae. There are at least two described species in Baloghiella.

== Species ==
- Baloghiella granulata Bayartogtokh & Akrami, 2000
- Baloghiella prima Bulanova-Zachvatkina, 1960
