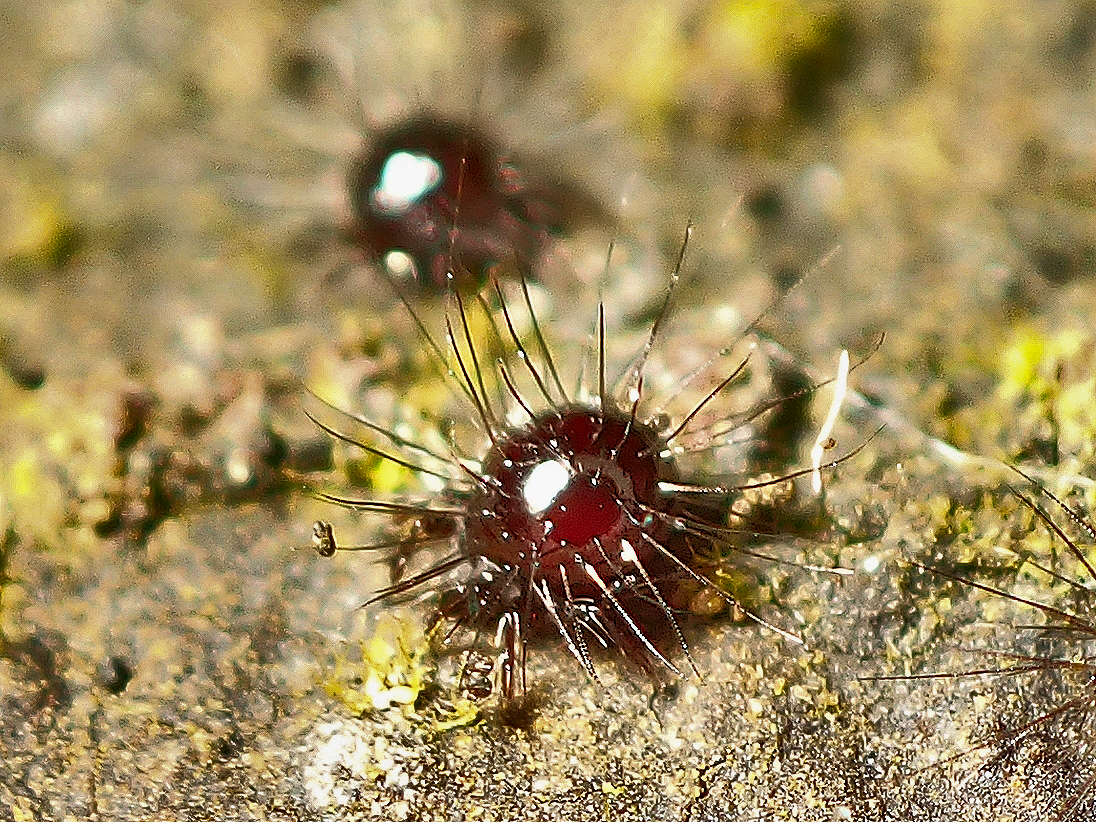

Scientific classification
- Domain: Eukaryota
- Kingdom: Animalia
- Phylum: Arthropoda
- Subphylum: Chelicerata
- Class: Arachnida
- Order: Oribatida
- Family: Neotrichozetidae
- Genus: Neotrichozetes; Michael, 1908
- Species: N. spinulosa

Binomial name
- Neotrichozetes spinulosa Travé, 1961

= Neotrichozetes =

Species of mite

Neotrichozetes is a monotypic genus of mites belonging to the order Oribatida. The single species, Neotrichozetes spinulosa, was first described in Puerto Blest, Argentina, associated to Nothofagus dombeyi forests. It can also be found in New Zealand.

== Description ==
N. spinulosa is a small brown mite (0.71–0.72 mm). On the dorsal surface there are numerous hairs, which are very long and coarse.
