= Plateremaeidae =

Plateremaeidae Temporal range: Cretaceous–present

Scientific classification
- Kingdom: Animalia
- Phylum: Arthropoda
- Subphylum: Chelicerata
- Class: Arachnida
- Order: Oribatida
- Suborder: Brachypylina
- Family: Plateremaeidae; Trägårdh, 1926

Family of mites

Plateremaeidae is a family of oribatids in the order Sarcoptiformes. There are about 7 genera and 19 described species in Plateremaeidae.

== Genera ==
These seven genera belong to the family Plateremaeidae.

- Allodamaeus Banks, 1947
- Balogheremaeus Arillo & Subías, 2006
- Calipteremaeus Paschoal, 1987
- Lopheremaeus Paschoal, 1988
- Paralopheremaeus Paschoal, 1987
- Pedrocortesia
- Plateremaeus Berlese, 1908
