= Archegozetes longisetosus =

Scientific classification
- Kingdom: Animalia
- Phylum: Arthropoda
- Subphylum: Chelicerata
- Class: Arachnida
- Order: Sarcoptiformes
- Family: Trhypochtoniidae
- Genus: Archegozetes
- Species: A. longisetosus

Binomial name
- Archegozetes longisetosus Aoki, 1965

Species of mite

Archegozetes longisetosus is a species of tropical moss mite in the family Trhypochthoniidae. It has been used as a model organism and has been found to have a very high pulling strength relative to its size.

== Reproduction ==
Mites in the suborder Desmonomata are thought to have been reproducing exclusively by parthenogenesis for a very long time. All individuals of Archegozetes longisetosus are female and clutches of two to thirty eggs are laid every few days with the reproductive rate averaging 1.3 eggs per day. There are six developmental stages, a prelarval and a larval stage, three nymphal stages and an adult stage.

== Food ==
Oribatid mites differ from other chelicerate animals such as spiders by the fact that they feed on food particles which they digest internally rather than fluid food digested externally. In a feeding experiment, specimens of Archegozetes longisetosus were offered algae Protococcus sp. scraped from tree bark, two fungi, Stachybotrys sp. and Alternaria sp., and some filter papers made of cellulose-rich wood fibres. They fed preferentially on the algae and also consumed the Alternaria but rejected the Stachybotrys and the filter papers. After about ten days they started to secrete chitinase but did not develop cellulase enzymes to break down cellulose under any of the experimental treatments.

== Predators ==
Small rove beetles of the family Staphylinidae live among the leaf litter and largely feed on mites. Archegozetes longisetosus seems to have a chemical defence against being eaten as it has a pair of large oil glands on its abdomen. It was found that the beetles would eat mites from which the oil glands had been removed but would not eat intact specimens.

== Use as model organism ==
Researchers have found that the pulling strength of the 1 mm (0.04 in) Archegozetes longisetosus equals about 1,180 times its own weight, five times more than might be expected for an animal of this size. As this study was the first to measure the claw forces of mites, other species could well have stronger pulling forces.

Archegozetes longisetosus has been used as a model organism for studies in chelicerate morphology, function, behaviour and evolution because of its short life cycle and the ease with which it can be cultured in the laboratory. All the mites of this species used in laboratories around the world are descended from one female collected from the wild in 1993.
