= Maudheimia =

Scientific classification
- Kingdom: Animalia
- Phylum: Arthropoda
- Subphylum: Chelicerata
- Class: Arachnida
- Order: Oribatida
- Family: Maudheimiidae; J. Balogh & P. Balogh, 1984
- Genus: Maudheimia; Dalenius, 1958

Genus of mites

Maudheimia is a genus of oribatid mite, the only one in the family Maudheimiidae. All species within this genus are native to continental Antarctica. Adults generally measure around 0.6–0.7 mm in length with a lightly hardened exoskeleton compared to many other oribatid mites. They occupy ice-free areas, called nunataks, in continental Antarctica, typically found under stones, in thin soils, and among moss or lichen patches.

The following species are recognized in this genus:

- Maudheimia petronia Wallwork, 1962
- Maudheimia tanngardenensis Coetzee, 1997
- Maudheimia wilsoni Dalenius, 1958
