= Vata thomsonii =

Scientific classification
- Kingdom: Animalia
- Phylum: Arthropoda
- Clade: Pancrustacea
- Class: Insecta
- Order: Coleoptera
- Suborder: Adephaga
- Family: Cicindelidae
- Genus: Vata
- Species: V. thomsonii

Binomial name
- Vata thomsonii (Perroud, 1864)

Synonyms
- Cicindela thomsonii Perroud, 1864; Prothyma thomsonii; Baloghiella caledonica Mandl, 1981; Vata caledonica

Species of beetle

Vata thomsonii is a species of tiger beetle. This species is found in New Caledonia.
