= Mochlozetidae =

Scientific classification
- Kingdom: Animalia
- Phylum: Arthropoda
- Subphylum: Chelicerata
- Class: Arachnida
- Order: Oribatida
- Superfamily: Oripodoidea
- Family: Mochlozetidae; Grandjean, 1960

Family of mites

Mochlozetidae is a family of mites and ticks in the order Sarcoptiformes. There are about 12 genera and at least 50 described species in Mochlozetidae.

== Genera ==
- Calugarella J. & P. Balogh, 1992
- Dynatozetes Grandjean, 1960
- Gephyrazetes Hirauchi, 1999
- Mahunkazetes J. & P. Balogh, 1992
- Mochlobates Norton, 1984
- Mochloribatula Mahunka, 1978
- Mochlozetes Grandjean, 1930
- Nesiotizetes Jacot, 1934
- Paralobozetes Tseng, 1984
- Podoribates Berlese, 1908
- Unguizetes Sellnick, 1925
- Uracrobates Balogh & Mahunka, 1967
