= Ehrman Syme Nadal =

American journalist (1843–1922)

- Born: February 13, 1843; Lewisburg, West Virginia, U.S.
- Died: July 26, 1922 (aged 79); Princeton, New Jersey, U.S.
- Resting place: Mount Kisco Cemetery; Mount Kisco, New York, U.S.
- Education: Columbia University; Yale College (BA)
- Occupations: Journalist; educator; writer
- Years active: 1864–1896

Ehrman Syme Nadal (February 13, 1843 – July 26, 1922) was an American journalist, educator, and writer.

== Early life ==
Ehrman Syme Nadal was born on February 13, 1843, in Lewisburg, West Virginia, to Jane (née Mays) and Bernard Harrison Nadal. His paternal grandfather emigrated from France. His father was a college professor and pastor. His father was chaplain of the U.S. House of Representatives.

Nadal was prepared for college by his father. He attended Columbia University for two years and then attended Yale College. He graduated from Yale in 1864 with a Bachelor of Arts. He was a member of the Linonian Society and the Varuna Boat Club of Yale.

== Career ==
From 1864 to 1865, Nadal taught at Dickinson Seminary. He then taught in Dansville, New York, and then Leavenworth, Kansas. In 1867, he worked for the federal government. He then worked for the United States Mint in Philadelphia and at the Dead Letter Office in Washington, D.C.

Nadal served as a secretary of the United States Legation at London from 1870 to 1875 and from 1877 to 1884, under ambassadors John Lothrop Motley, John Welsh, and James Russell Lowell.

Nadal was then on the staff of the New York Evening Post. In 1884, after he returned to New York City, he was appointed secretary of three civil service boards of examiners and remained in those roles for three years. He wrote Impressions of London Social Life (1875), Essays at Home and Elsewhere (1882), A Virginian Village, and Zweibak, or Notes of a Professional Exile. He also wrote for magazines and newspapers. From 1892 to 1893, he gave lectures on English composition at Columbia University. He was a lecturer at Columbia from 1895 to 1896.

== Personal life ==
Nadal did not marry. He was a member of St James's Club in London and the Century Association in New York City. He also lived at the Century Association in New York City.

Nadal died on July 26, 1922, in Princeton, New Jersey. He was buried at Mount Kisco Cemetery in Mount Kisco, New York.
