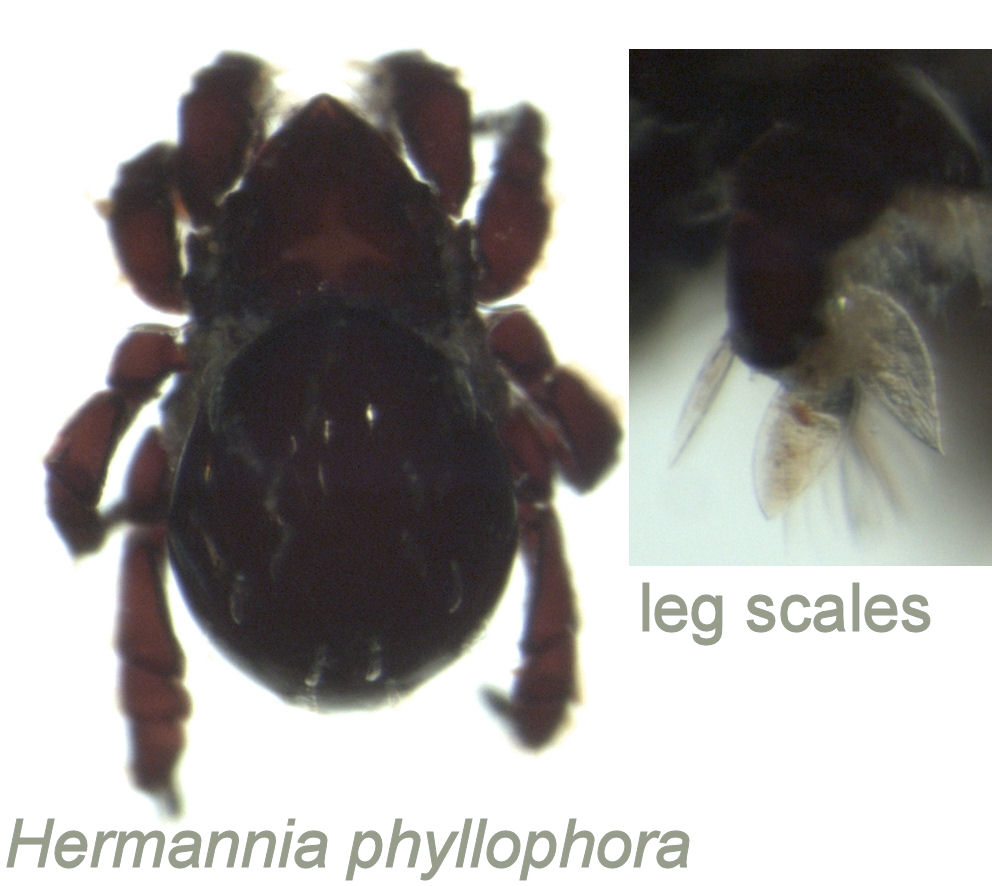
- adult Hermannia phyllophora Michael, 1908

Scientific classification
- Kingdom: Animalia
- Phylum: Arthropoda
- Subphylum: Chelicerata
- Class: Arachnida
- Order: Oribatida
- Suborder: Desmonomata
- Family: Hermanniidae; Sellnick, 1928

= Hermanniidae =

Hermanniidae Temporal range: Palaeogene–present

Family of mites

Hermanniidae is a family of mites in the order Oribatida. There are at least 3 genera and 80 described species in Hermanniidae.

== Genera ==
- Galapagacarus P. Balogh, 1985
- Hermannia Nicolet, 1855
- Neohermannia Bayoumi & Mahunka, 1979
