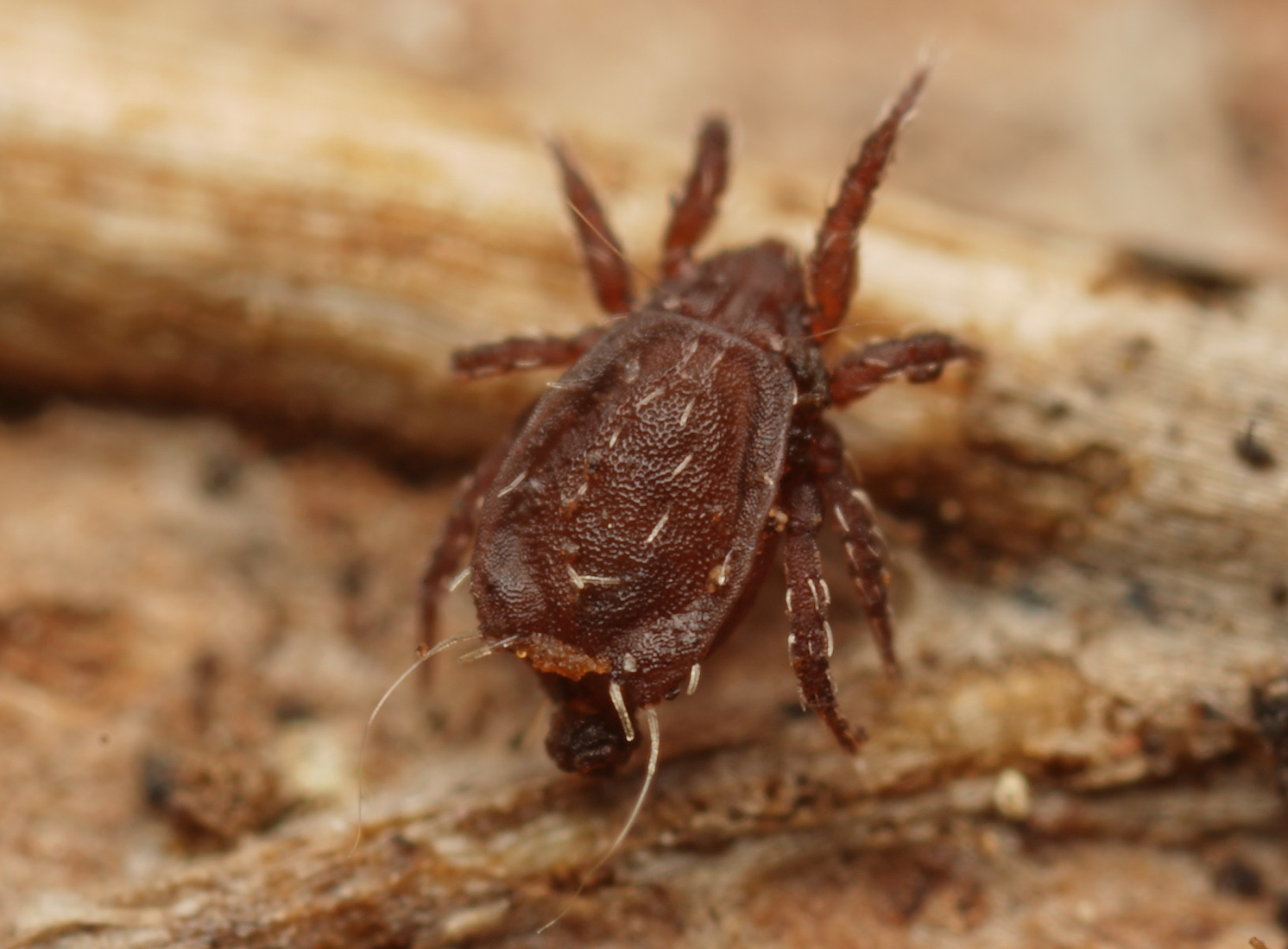
- Nothrus palustris

Scientific classification
- Kingdom: Animalia
- Phylum: Arthropoda
- Subphylum: Chelicerata
- Class: Arachnida
- Order: Oribatida
- Suborder: Enarthronota
- Family: Nothridae; Berlese, 1896

= Nothridae =

Nothridae Temporal range: Cretaceous–present

Family of mites

Nothridae is a family of oribatids in the order Oribatida. There are at least 3 genera and 70 described species in the family Nothridae.

== Genera ==
- Nothrus Koch, 1836
- Novonothrus Hammer, 1966
- Trichonothrus Mahunka, 1986
