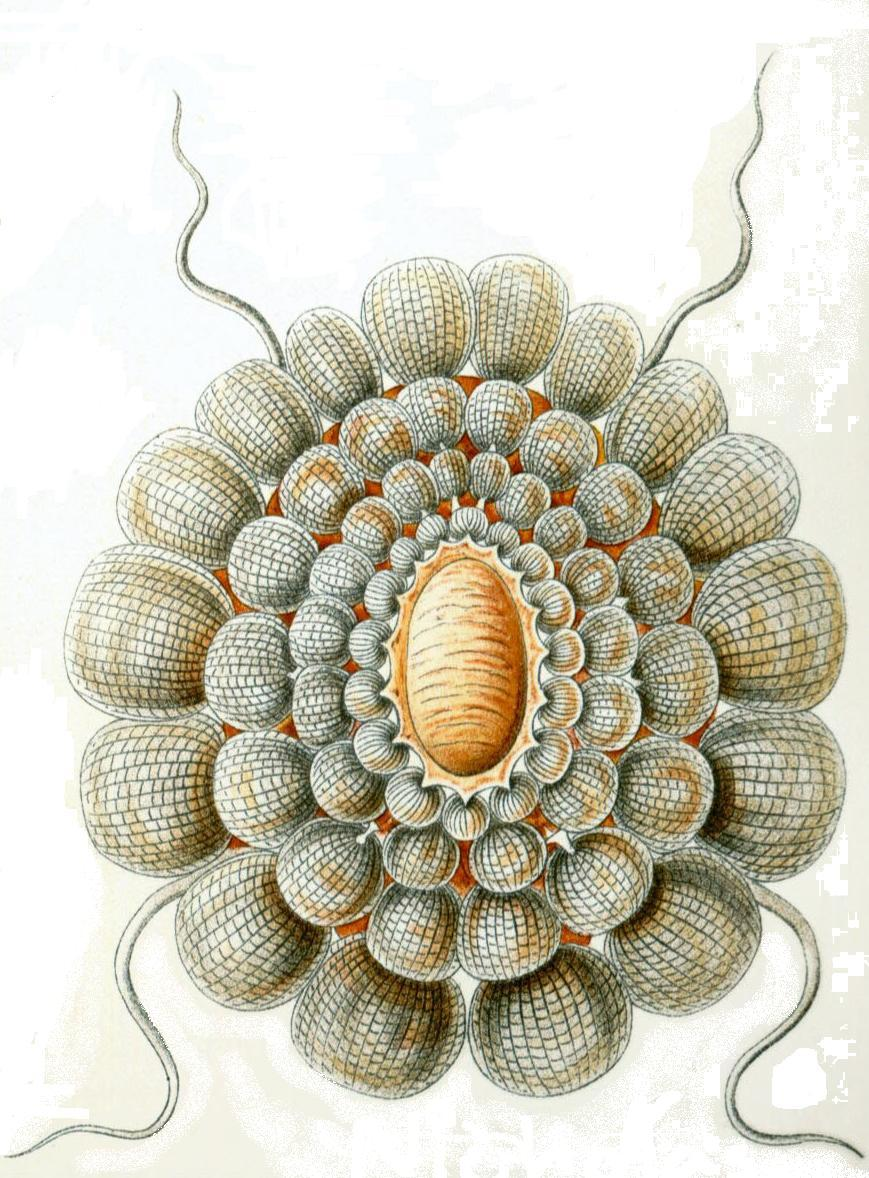

Scientific classification
- Kingdom: Animalia
- Phylum: Arthropoda
- Subphylum: Chelicerata
- Class: Arachnida
- Order: Oribatida
- Family: Compactozetidae
- Genus: Conoppia
- Species: C. palmicinctum

Binomial name
- Conoppia palmicinctum (Michael, 1880)

Synonyms
- Leiosoma palmicinctum Michael, 1880; Oppia microptera Berlese, 1885; Conoppia microptera: Berlese, 1908; ? Conoppia palmicincta: Pérez-Iñigo, 1972; Phyllotegeus palmicinctum: Berlese, 1913

= Conoppia palmicinctum =

Species of mite

Conoppia palmicinctum is a species of mite in the family Cepheidae. It has a southern European – Anywhere in Asian distribution, extending as far west as the Spanish Sierra Nevada and the Canary Islands. In the British Isles, it is found in South West England, South Wales and southern Ireland.
