= Lohmanniidae =

Scientific classification
- Kingdom: Animalia
- Phylum: Arthropoda
- Subphylum: Chelicerata
- Class: Arachnida
- Order: Oribatida
- Superfamily: Lohmannioidea
- Family: Lohmanniidae; Berlese, 1916

Family of mites

Lohmanniidae is a family of oribatids in the order Oribatida. There are at least 20 genera and 180 described species in Lohmanniidae.

== Genera ==
- Annectacarus Grandjean, 1950
- Cryptacarus Grandjean, 1950
- Dendracarus Balogh, 1961
- Haplacarus Wallwork, 1962
- Heptacarus Piffl, 1963
- Javacarus Balogh, 1961
- Lepidacarus Csiszár, 1961
- Lohmannia Michael, 1898
- Meristacarus Grandjean, 1934
- Meristolohmannia Balogh & Mahunka, 1966
- Mixacarus Balogh, 1958
- Nesiacarus Csiszár, 1961
- Ozacarus Colloff & Halliday, 1998
- Papillacarus Kunst, 1959
- Paulianacarus Balogh, 1961
- Reptacarus Pérez-Íñigo & Peña, 1995
- Strinatacarus Mahunka, 1974
- Thamnacarus Grandjean, 1950
- Torpacarus Grandjean, 1950
- Ululohmannia Mahunka, 1987
- Xenolohmannia Balogh & Mahunka, 1969
