= Crotonia (literary society) =

Literary society at Yale University

Crotonia was the first literary society to exist at Yale University. Little is known about it. It existed until at least 1772. A new literary society with the same name was created in 2007.

== Context ==
In the eighteenth and nineteenth centuries, the course of study at Yale was drastically different from what it is now. The majority of literature studied was that of the ancient Greeks, Romans, and, in the extensive study of the Old Testament, Hebrews. English literature was not introduced into the curriculum until the 1850s. The young men who studied at Yale at the time felt the need to supplement their studies with a working knowledge of contemporary literature and a forum in which to gain “skill in making known [their] own thoughts in good, plain English” .

The literary societies, which first appeared at Yale and soon afterward at many other colleges and universities, were designed to fill this void. Unlike other societies, students of any class from freshmen to seniors could be members of the literary societies; in fact, by the end of the eighteenth century, everyone at Yale belonged to one and there was often fierce competition for the recruitment of freshmen.

== Activities ==
These societies were primarily debating societies, but they also held speeches and poetry readings and each had a substantial library, filled with books that one could not find in Yale College's collection. Only the members of a given society had access to its library, and debates primarily took place within the society, though by the mid-1800s it was not unheard of for a speech to be attended by members of all three societies, or for inter-society debates to be organized. At the end of the Civil War, the Yale College faculty attempted to ban fraternities and sophomore societies. As a cover for their continued existence, many of these groups took the guise of small debating societies. Linonia and Brothers in Unity no longer dominated the college's social scene, and the Yale Union became the primary forum for debate. In 1872, Linonia and Brothers in Unity gave up their libraries to the college's collection and were wholly absorbed by the Union, which enjoyed intermittent existence until 1934 when it became the Yale Political Union.
