= Crotoniidae =

Crotoniidae Temporal range: Neogene–present

Scientific classification
- Kingdom: Animalia
- Phylum: Arthropoda
- Subphylum: Chelicerata
- Class: Arachnida
- Order: Oribatida
- Superfamily: Crotonioidea
- Family: Crotoniidae; Thorell, 1876

Species
- See text

Diversity
- 2 genera, c. 40 species

Synonyms
- Crotonidae; Holonothridae

Family of mites

Crotoniidae are a family of mites of the Holosomata group that may be the first animal lineage to have abandoned sexual reproduction and then re-evolved it. This is a spectacular case of atavism, and later convergent evolution.

== Species ==
- Crotonia Thorell, 1876
  - Crotonia alluaudi (Berlese, 1916) — Africa
  - Crotonia americana (Berlese, 1901) — South America
  - Crotonia ardala Luxton, 1987 — Australia
  - Crotonia blaszaki Szywilewska, Olszanowski & Norton, 2005 — Chile
  - Crotonia borbora Luxton, 1987 — Australia
  - Crotonia brassicae Wallwork, 1977 — St. Helena
  - Crotonia brevicornuta (Wallwork, 1966) — Antarctica
  - Crotonia camelus (Berlese, 1910) — New Caledonia
  - Crotonia capistrata Luxton, 1987 — Australia
  - Crotonia caudalis (Hammer, 1966) — New Zealand
  - Crotonia cervicorna Luxton, 1982 — New Zealand
  - Crotonia chiloensis Wallwork, 1977 — Chile
  - Crotonia cophinaria (Michael, 1908) — Argentina, New Zealand
  - Crotonia cupulata Luxton, 1982 — New Zealand
  - Crotonia dicella Colloff, 1990 — Natal, South Africa
  - Crotonia ecphyla Colloff, 1990 — Natal
  - Crotonia flagellata (Balogh & Csiszar, 1963) — South America
  - Crotonia jethurmerae Lee, 1985 — South Australia
  - Crotonia lanceolata Wallwork, 1977 — St. Helena
  - Crotonia longibulbula Luxton, 1982 — New Zealand
  - Crotonia lyrata Colloff, 1990 — Natal
  - Crotonia marlenae Olszanowski, 1997 — Serra do Mar, Parati area; Brazil
  - Crotonia nukuhivae (Jacot, 1934) — Pacific islands
  - Crotonia obtecta (Cambridge, 1875) — Chile, New Zealand
  - Crotonia ovata Olszanowski, 2000 — Hellyer River gorge: Tasmania
  - Crotonia pauropelor Colloff, 1990 — Natal
  - Crotonia perforata Wallwork, 1977 — St. Helena
  - Crotonia pulchra (Beck, 1962) — Neotropics
  - Crotonia pyemaireneri Colloff, 2009 — Tasmania
  - Crotonia reticulata Luxton, 1982 — New Zealand
  - Crotonia rothschildi (Berlese, 1916) — Ethiopia
  - Crotonia tasmaniana Colloff, 2009 — Tasmania
  - Crotonia tryjanowskii Olszanowski, 2000 — New England N.P.: New South Wales
  - Crotonia tuberculata Luxton, 1982 — New Zealand
  - Crotonia unguifera (Michael, 1908) New Zealand
- Holonothrus Wallwork, 1963
  - Holonothrus artus Olszanowski, 1999 — Aisen, Queulat National Park, Puerto Cisnes area: Chile; Melanesia
  - Holonothrus concavus Wallwork, 1966 — Antarctica
  - Holonothrus foliatus Wallwork, 1963 — Antarctica
  - Holonothrus gracilis Olszanowski, 1997 — South Island, Nelson Lakes National Park: New Zealand
  - Holonothrus mitis Olszanowski, 1991 — Tasmania, Australia
  - Holonothrus naskreckii Olszanowski, 1997 — South Island, Nelson Lakes National Park; New Zealand
  - Holonothrus nortoni Olszanowski, 1999 — Dominica, Trois Pitons: Leeward Islands
  - Holonothrus novaecaledoniae Olszanowski, 1997 — Mount Paine: New Caledonia
  - Holonothrus papua Balogh & Balogh, 1986 — Papua New Guinea
  - Holonothrus pulcher Hammer, 1966 — New Zealand
  - Holonothrus robustus Olszanowski, 1991 — Tasmania, Australia
  - Holonothrus venetiolanus Olszanowski, 1999 — Mérida, Laguna Negra: Venezuela; neotropical
  - Holonothrus virungensis Norton & Olszanowski, 1989 — Congo: Kinshasa
