= Vata (beetle) =

Scientific classification
- Kingdom: Animalia
- Phylum: Arthropoda
- Clade: Pancrustacea
- Class: Insecta
- Order: Coleoptera
- Suborder: Adephaga
- Family: Cicindelidae
- Tribe: Cicindelini
- Subtribe: Dromicina
- Genus: Vata; Fauvel, 1882

Synonyms
- Baloghiella Mandl, 1981

Genus of beetles

Vata is a genus of beetles in the family Cicindelidae. The genus is endemic to New Caledonia.

== Species ==
There are two recognized species:

- Vata gracilipalpis W. Horn, 1909
- Vata thomsonii (Perroud, 1864)
