= Steganacaridae =

Scientific classification
- Kingdom: Animalia
- Phylum: Arthropoda
- Subphylum: Chelicerata
- Class: Arachnida
- Order: Oribatida
- Family: Steganacaridae; Niedbała, 1986

Family of mites

Steganacaridae is a family of mites in the order Oribatida.

== Genera ==
- Austrophthiracarus
- Hoplophthiracarus
- Notophthiracarus
