= Hypochthoniidae =

Scientific classification
- Kingdom: Animalia
- Phylum: Arthropoda
- Subphylum: Chelicerata
- Class: Arachnida
- Order: Oribatida
- Suborder: Enarthronota
- Family: Hypochthoniidae; Berlese, 1910

Family of mites

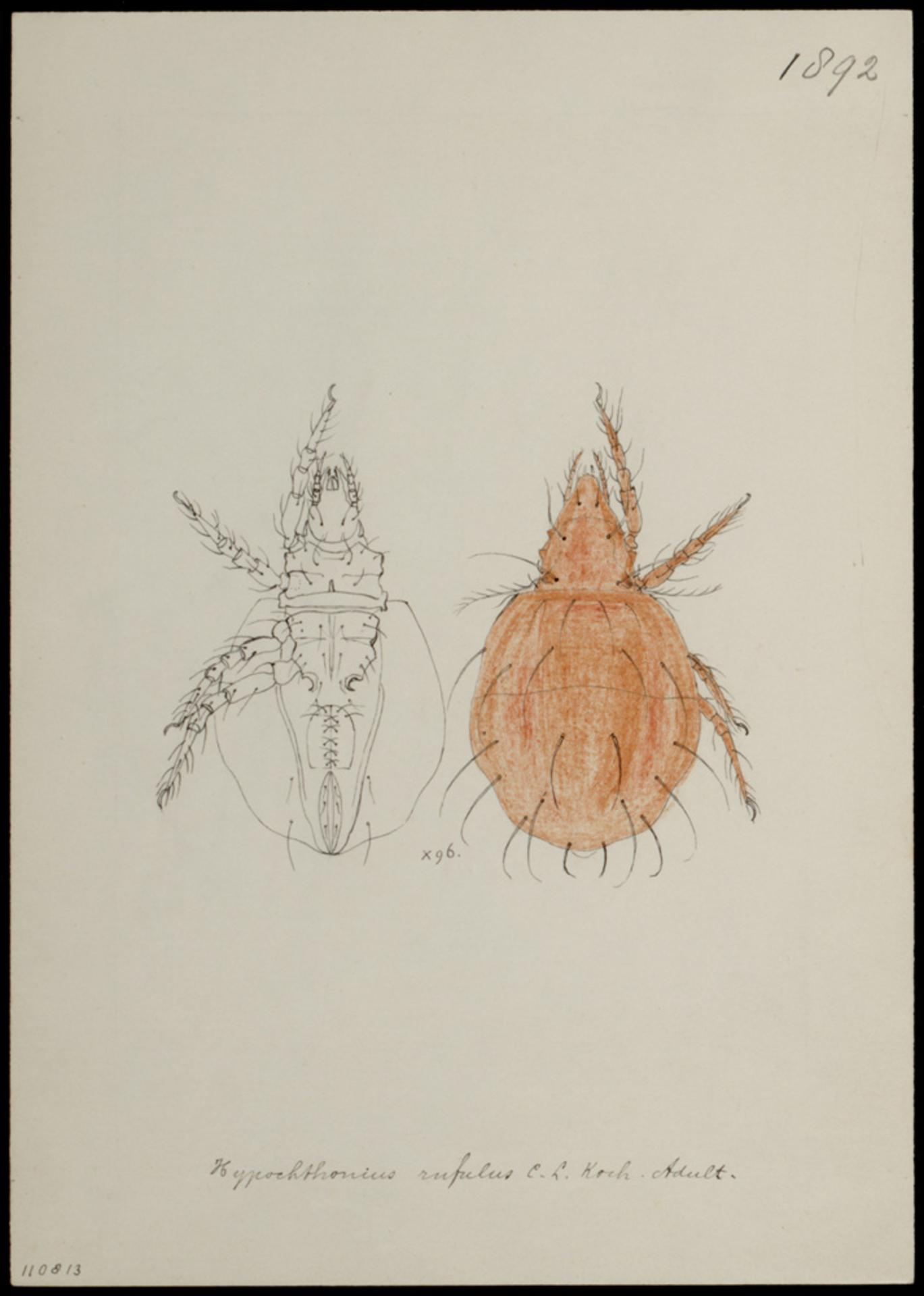
Illustration of Hypochthonius rufulus.

Hypochthoniidae is a family of oribatids, an order of mites. There are at least 4 genera and 20 described species in Hypochthoniidae.

== Genera ==
- Eohypochthonius Jacot, 1938
- Hypochthonius Koch, 1835
- Malacoangelia Berlese, 1913
- Nothrolohmannia Balogh, 1968
