= Yale: A History =

1999 history book by Brooks Mather Kelley

- Author: Brooks Mather Kelley
- Subject: History of education
- Publisher: Yale University Press
- Publication date: January 11, 1999
- Pages: 608
- ISBN: 9780300016369

Yale: A History is a 1999 book written by Brooks Mather Kelley on the history of Yale University.
