= Euphthiracaridae =

Euphthiracaridae Temporal range: Palaeogene–present
- Euphthiracarus cernuus

Scientific classification
- Kingdom: Animalia
- Phylum: Arthropoda
- Subphylum: Chelicerata
- Class: Arachnida
- Order: Oribatida
- Infraorder: Mixonomata
- Section: Euptyctima
- Superfamily: Euphthiracaroidea
- Family: Euphthiracaridae; Jacot, 1930

Family of mites

Euphthiracaridae is a family of mites in the order Oribatida.

== Genera ==
- Acrotritia
- Bukitritia
- Euphthiracarus
- Hummelia
- Microtritia
- Pseudotritia
- Rhysotritia
- Sumatrotritia
