= Cosmochthoniidae =

Cosmochthoniidae Temporal range: Carboniferous–present

Scientific classification
- Kingdom: Animalia
- Phylum: Arthropoda
- Subphylum: Chelicerata
- Class: Arachnida
- Order: Oribatida
- Suborder: Enarthronota
- Family: Cosmochthoniidae; Grandjean, 1947

Family of mites

Cosmochthoniidae is a family of cosmochthoniids in the order Oribatida. There are about 6 genera and at least 40 described species in Cosmochthoniidae.

== Genera ==
- Cosmochthonius Berlese, 1910
- Gozmanyina Balogh & Mahunka, 1983
- Krivolutskiella Gordeeva, 1980
- Nipponiella Gordeeva, 1980
- Phyllozetes Gordeeva, 1978
- Trichthonius Hammer, 1961
