= Hoplophthiracarus =

Scientific classification
- Kingdom: Animalia
- Phylum: Arthropoda
- Subphylum: Chelicerata
- Class: Arachnida
- Order: Oribatida
- Family: Steganacaridae
- Genus: Hoplophthiracarus

Genus of mites

Hoplophthiracarus is a genus of mites in the family Steganacaridae.

== Species ==
- Hoplophthiracarus bisulcus Niedbała, 1993
