= Brachychthoniidae =

Brachychthoniidae Temporal range: Palaeogene–present

Scientific classification
- Kingdom: Animalia
- Phylum: Arthropoda
- Subphylum: Chelicerata
- Class: Arachnida
- Order: Oribatida
- Suborder: Enarthronota
- Family: Brachychthoniidae; Thor, 1934

Family of mites

Brachychthoniidae is a family of oribatids in the order Oribatida. There are about 11 genera and at least 150 described species in Brachychthoniidae.

== Genera ==
- Brachychthonius Berlese, 1910
- Eobrachychthonius Jacot, 1936
- Liochthonius Hammen, 1959
- Mixochthonius Niedbala, 1972
- Neobrachychthonius Moritz, 1976
- Neoliochthonius Lee, 1982
- Papillochthonius Gil-Martín, Subías & Arillo, 1992
- Poecilochthonius Balogh, 1943
- Sellnickochthonius Krivolutsky, 1964
- Synchthonius Hammen, 1952
- Verachthonius Moritz, 1976
