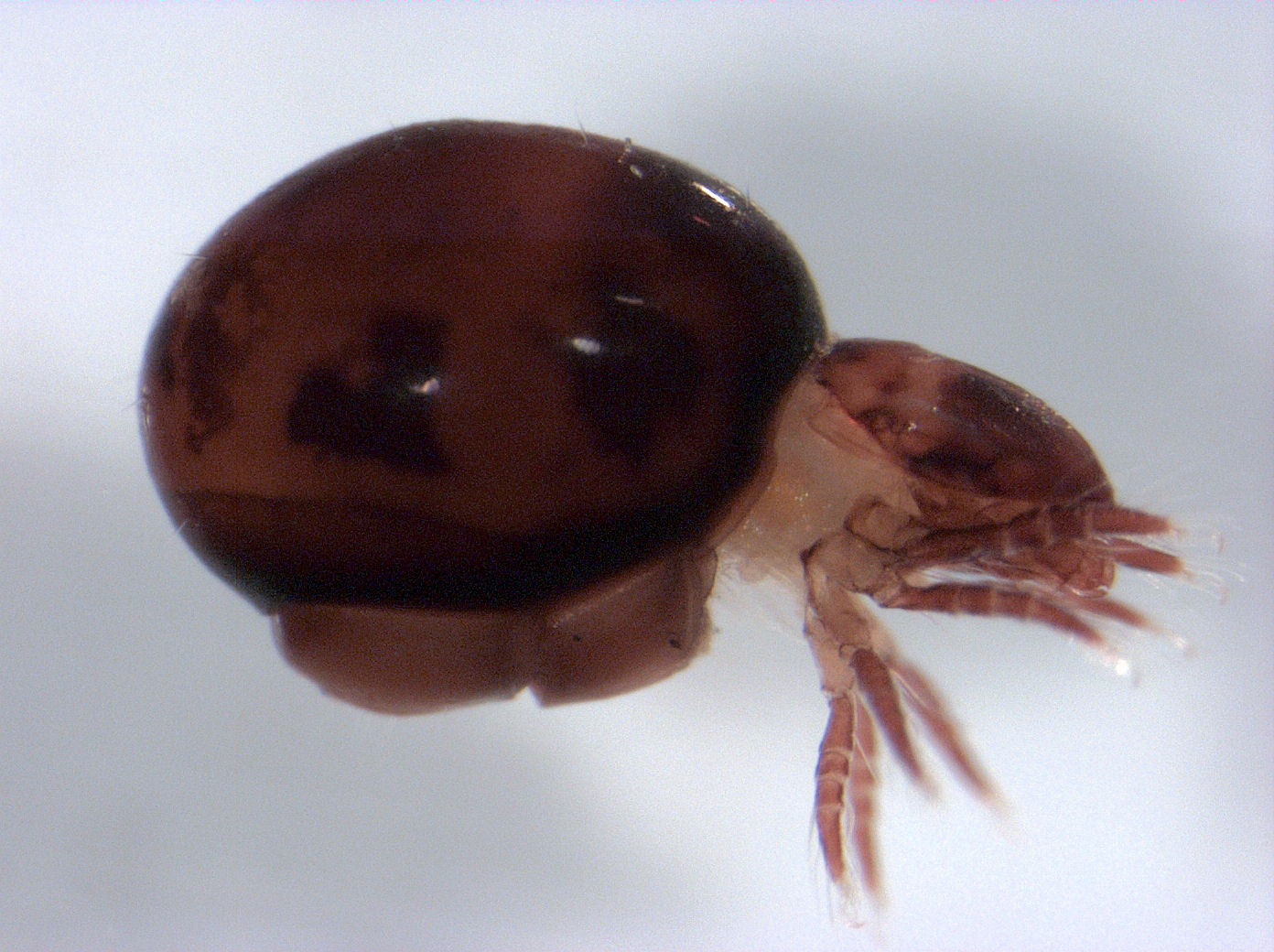
- Unidentified mite (Phthiracaridae)

Scientific classification
- Kingdom: Animalia
- Phylum: Arthropoda
- Subphylum: Chelicerata
- Class: Arachnida
- Superorder: Acariformes
- Order: Oribatida; Dugès, 1833

Suborders
- Brachypylina; Enarthronota; Holosomata; Mixonomata; Palaeosomata; Parhyposomata

Diversity
- c. 200 families, 1,200 genera, 6,600 species

Synonyms
- Cryptostigmata

= Oribatida =

Oribatida Temporal range: Middle Devonian–present

Order of mites

Oribatida (formerly Cryptostigmata), also known as oribatid mites, moss mites or beetle mites, are either a suborder or an order of mites, in the "chewing Acariformes" clade Sarcoptiformes. They range in size from 0.2 to 1.4 millimetres (0.008 to 0.055 in). There are currently 12,000 species that have been identified, but researchers estimate that there may be anywhere from 60,000 to 120,000 total species. Oribatid mites are by far the most prevalent of all arthropods in forest soils, and are essential for breaking down organic detritus and distributing fungi.

Oribatid mites generally have low metabolic rates, slow development and low fecundity. Species are iteroparous with adults living a relatively long time; for example, estimates of development time from egg to adult vary from several months to two years in temperate forest soils. Oribatid mites have six active instars: prelarva, larva, three nymphal instars and the adult. All these stages after the prelarva feed on a wide variety of material including living and dead plant and fungal material, lichens and carrion; some are predatory, but none is parasitic and feeding habits may differ between immatures and adults of the same species.

Many species have a mineralized exoskeleton as adults. In some, this includes a pair of pteromorphae: wing-like flaps that overhang the legs on either side. Some oribatids can also tuck in their legs underneath their protective armor, an ability known as ptychoidy, for more defence against predation.

Alkaloids are produced by some oribatids, presumably as another defence against predation. In turn, poison dart frogs that prey on oribatids sequester these alkaloids for their own defence.

The Oribatida are of economic importance as hosts of various tapeworm species, and by increasing the breakdown of organic material in the soil, as do the earthworms. However, contrary to many earthworms, they do not mix organic matter with mineral matter and are also known as scavengers. When feeding on coniferous litter phthiracarid mites tunnel (mine) needles, feeding on parenchyma and accumulating their ovoid faeces at the inside, letting intact the surrounding epidermis. Their role in the degradation of wood and more especially bark is also remarkable and has been registered in fossil records.

Many species of oribatid mites require extremely specific habitats, resulting in large diversity within the order due to the many niches they occupy, as attested by stable isotope studies. Some species are especially suited to dry conditions, or on bare lichen covered rocks, but the largest section of Oribatida prefers the moist forest floor and its accompanying litter, oribatid mite density being highest in forests with thick organic layers. There are a small number of species who have evolved to live on aquatic plants, often spending the majority of their life submersed underwater.

For the majority of species, sperm transfer happens through stalked spermatophores placed on the substrate by the male, which is then picked up by the female. Yet, in a few species, courtship behavior occurs, such as a 'promenade à deux' where the male leads the female, and nuptial gifts in the form of male secretions have been reported (e.g., in Collohmannia). In species such as Fortuynia atlantica, it is suspected that the male deposits a stalkless spermatophore during courtship and then leads the female over it, but this has never been directly observed. The only observation of a more direct sperm transfer is in a species of the genus Pilogalumna. Instead of courtship behavior, the male forcefully attaches a stalkless spermatophore close to the female's genital plate.

In contrast to the commonly held view that parthenogenetic lineages are short lived, four species-rich parthenogenetic clusters of the order Oribatida are very ancient and likely arose 400-300 million years ago. Parthenogenetic oribatid mite lineages have been hypothesized to be adapted to occupy narrow specialized ecological niches. However, it was recently shown that parthenogenetic oribatid mite species actually possess a widely adapted general-purpose genotype, and thus each such lineage might be viewed as a "jack-of-all-trades".

The Astigmatina, though once considered a separate group, are now considered part of Oribatida. They are quite different from other oribatids (e.g. many astigmatans are soft-bodied and some are parasitic), resulting in them often being treated separately.

Oribatids have a long fossil record extending back to the middle Devonian, around 376-379 million years ago from Gilboa, New York, among the oldest known fossils of acariform mites.

== Systematics ==
The order Oribatida is divided into the following taxa:

- Palaeosomata Grandjean, 1969

- Acaronychoidea Grandjean, 1932 (6 genera)

- Acaronychidae Grandjean, 1932

- Palaeacaroidea Grandjean, 1932 (8 genera)

- Palaeacaridae Grandjean, 1932

- Parhyposomata Balogh & Mahunka, 1979

- Parhypochthonioidea Grandjean, 1969 (3 genera)

- Parhypochthoniidae Grandjean, 1969
- Gehypochthoniidae Strenzke, 1963
- Elliptochthoniidae Norton, 1975

- Enarthronota Grandjean, 1947

- Hypochthonoidea Berlese, 1910 (c. 8 genera)

- Hypochthoniidae Berlese, 1910
- Eniochthoniidae Grandjean, 1947
- Arborichthoniidae Balogh & Balogh, 1992

- Brachychthonoidea Thor, 1934 (c. 11 genera)

- Brachychthoniidae Thor, 1934

- Cosmochthonioidea Grandjean, 1947 (c. 14 genera)

- Cosmochthoniidae Grandjean, 1947
- Heterochthoniidae Grandjean, 1954
- Haplochthoniidae Hammen, 1959
- Pediculochelidae Lavoipierre, 1946
- Sphaerochthoniidae Grandjean, 1947

- Atopochthonioidea Grandjean, 1949 (3 genera)

- Atopochthoniidae Grandjean, 1949
- Pterochthoniidae Grandjean, 1950
- Phyllochthoniidae Travé, 1967

- Protoplophoroidea Ewing, 1917 (c. 7 genera)

- Protoplophoridae Ewing, 1917

- Mixonomata Grandjean, 1969

- Dichosomata Balogh & Mahunka, 1979

- Nehypochthonioidea Norton & Metz, 1980

- Nehypochthoniidae Norton & Metz, 1980

- Perlohmannioidea Grandjean, 1954

- Perlohmaniidae Grandjean, 1954
- Collohmanniidae Grandjean, 1958

- Eulohmannioidea Grandjean, 1931

- Eulohmanniidae Grandjean, 1931

- Epilohmannioidea Oudemans, 1923

- Epilohmanniidae Oudemans, 1923

- Lohmannioidea Berlese, 1916

- Lohmanniidae Berlese, 1916

- Euptyctima Grandjean, 1967

- Mesoplophoroidea Ewing, 1917

- Mesoplophoridae Ewing, 1917

- Euphthiracaroidea Jacot, 1930

- Oribotritiidae Grandjean, 1954
- Euphthiracaridae Jacot, 1930
- Synichotritiidae Walker, 1965

- Phthiracaroidea Perty, 1841

- Phthiracaridae Perty, 1841
- Steganacaridae Niedbała, 1986

- Holosomata Grandjean, 1969

- Crotonioidea Thorell, 1876

- Thrypochthoniidae Willmann, 1931
- Malaconothridae Berlese, 1916
- Nothridae Berlese, 1896
- Camisiidae Oudemans, 1900
- Crotoniidae Thorell, 1876

- Nanhermannioidea Sellnick, 1928

- Nanhermanniidae Sellnick, 1928

- Hermannioidea Sellnick, 1928

- Hermanniidae Sellnick, 1928

- Brachypylina Hull, 1918

- Pycnonoticae Grandjean, 1954

- Hermannielloidea Grandjean, 1934 (2 families)
- Neoliodoidea Sellnick, 1928 (1 family)
- Plateremaeoidea Trägårdh, 1926 (4 families)
- Gymnodamaeoidea Grandjean, 1954 (2 families)

- Damaeoidea Berlese, 1896 (1 family)

- Damaeidae Berlese, 1896

- Polypterozetoidea Grandjean, 1959 (2 families)
- Cepheoidea Berlese, 1896 (7 families)
- Charassobatoidea Grandjean, 1958 (3 families)
- Microzetoidea Grandjean, 1936 (1 family)
- Zetorchestoidea Michael, 1898 (1 family)
- Gustavioidea Oudemans, 1900 (8 families)
- Eremaeoidea Oudemans, 1900 (4 families)
- Amerobelboidea Grandjean, 1954 (10 families)
- Eremelloidea Balogh, 1961 (7 families)
- Oppioidea Sellnick, 1937 (12 families)
- Trizetoidea Ewing, 1917 (6 families)
- Otocepheoidea Balogh, 1961 (4 families)
- Carabodoidea Koch, 1837 (3 families)
- Tectocepheoidea Grandjean, 1954 (2 families)
- Hydrozetoidea Grandjean, 1954 (1 family)
- Ameronothroidea Willmann, 1931 (3 families)
- Cymbaeremaeoidea Sellnick, 1928 (3 families)

- Poronoticae Grandjean, 1954

- Licneremaeoidea Grandjean, 1931 (6 families)
- Phenopelopoidea Petrunkevitch, 1955 (1 family)
- Unduloribatoidea Kunst, 1971 (3 families)
- Limnozetoidea Thor, 1937 (2 families)
- Achipterioidea Thor, 1929 (2 families)
- Oribatelloidea Jacot, 1925 (3 families)
- Ceratozetoidea Jacot, 1925 (5 families)
- Zetomotrichoidea Grandjean, 1934 (1 family)
- Oripodoidea Jacot, 1925 (19 families)
- Galumnoidea Jacot, 1925 (3 families)

== See also ==
- Archegozetes longisetosus
- Conoppia palmicinctum
- Neotrichozetes
