= Arachnophagy =

Eating of arachnids

Arachnophagy (/əˈræknɒfədʒi/, from Greek ἀράχνη aráchnē, 'spider', and φαγεῖν phagein, 'to eat'), also known as araneophagy, describes a feeding behaviour that involves eating arachnids, a class of eight-legged arthropods that includes spiders and many other species groups including scorpions, ticks, and mites. Aside from arachnophagy by non-human creatures, the term can also refer to the practice of eating arachnids among humans.

== By non-humans ==
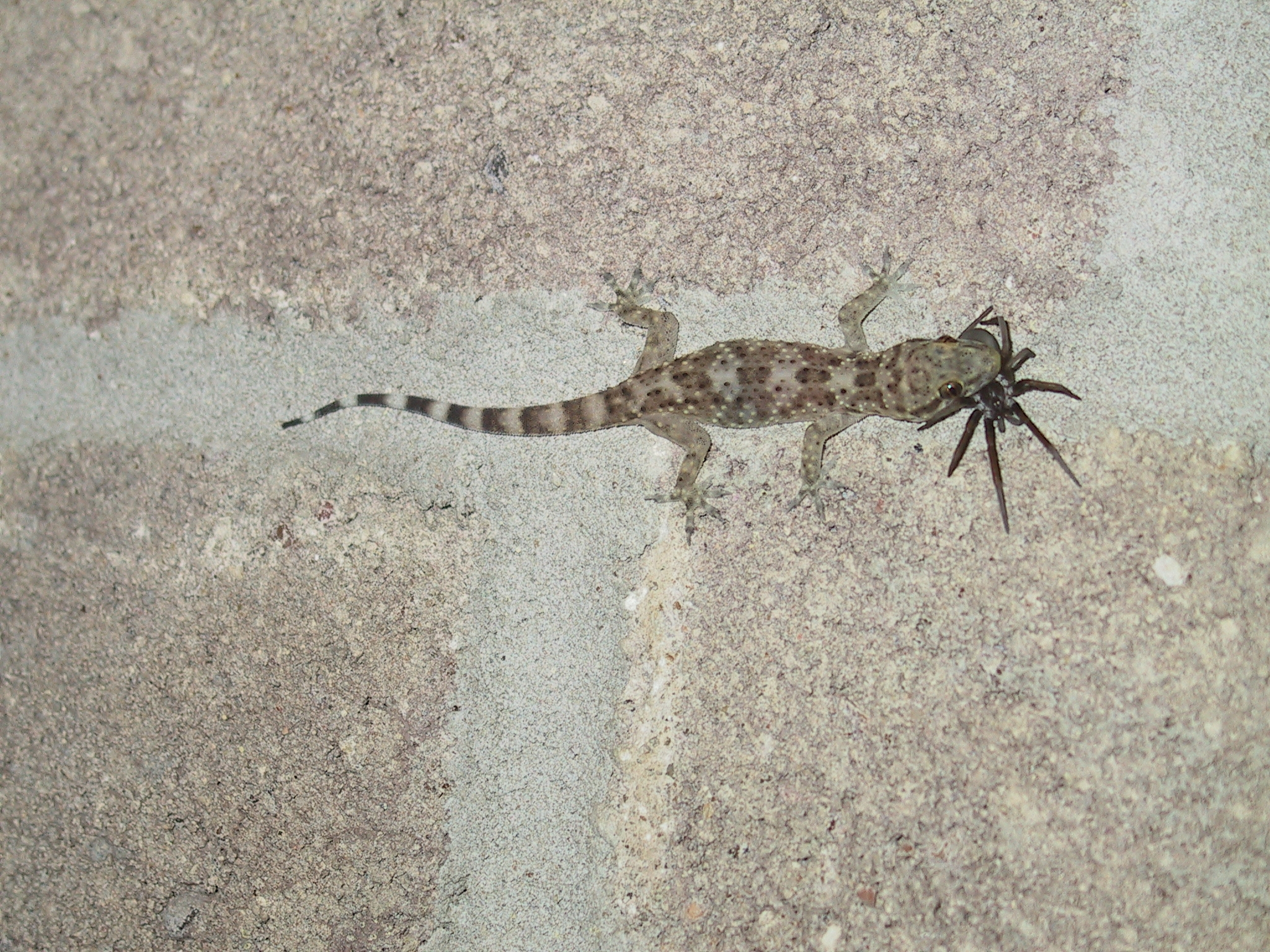
A house gecko feeding on spider

Arachnophagy is widespread among many animals, especially reptiles and birds. For example, arachnophagy is described among Philippine scops owls that feed on spider species such as Heteropoda venatoria.

Spiders are also eaten by many other types of animal, and spiders themselves can eat other spiders, including those of their own species, most commonly in acts of sexual cannibalism. Some species, e.g. those in the pirate spider family or in the genus Portia, specialize in hunting other spiders.

== By humans ==
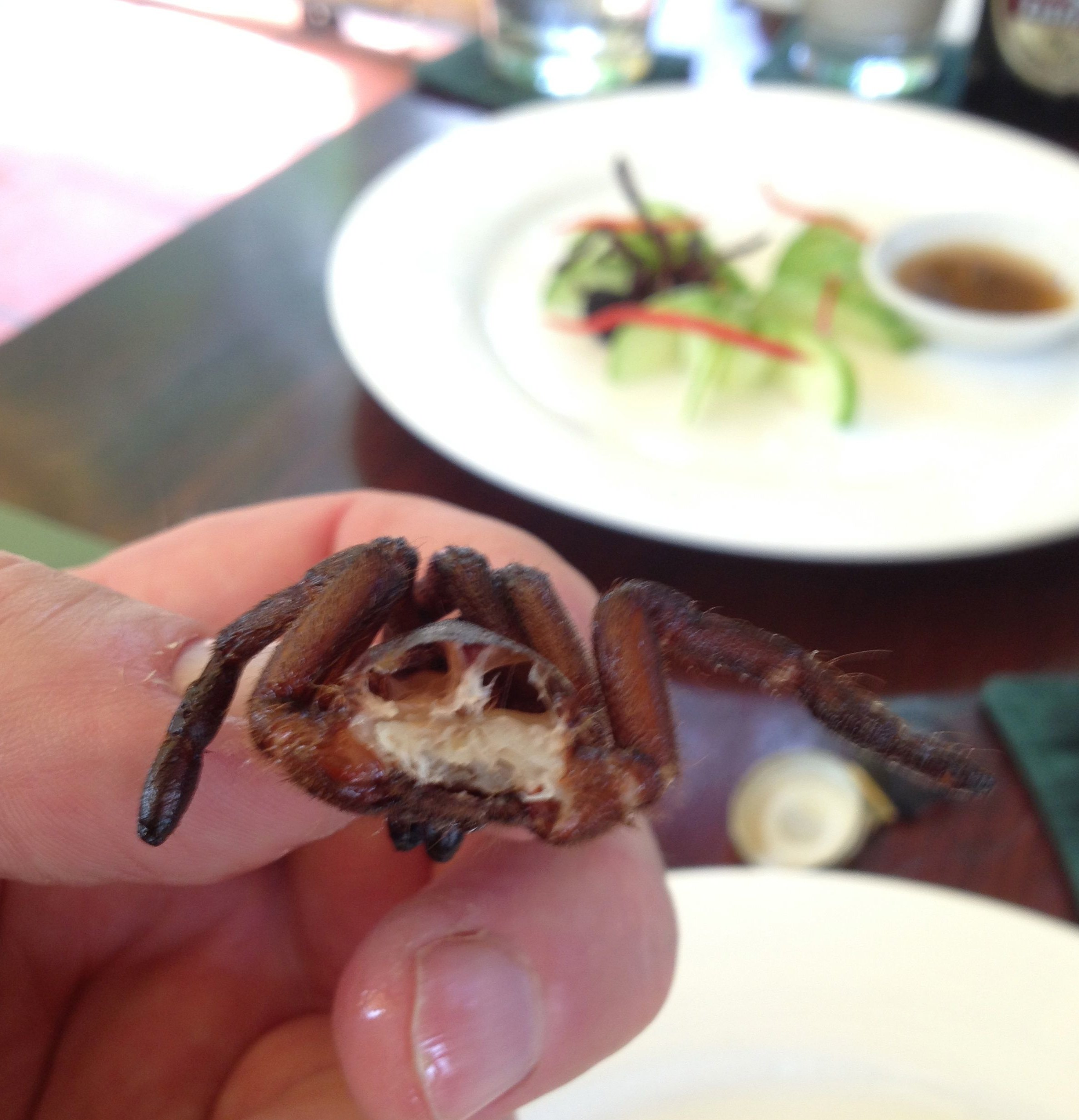
Arachnophagy is also found in human culture, describing the consumption of spiders

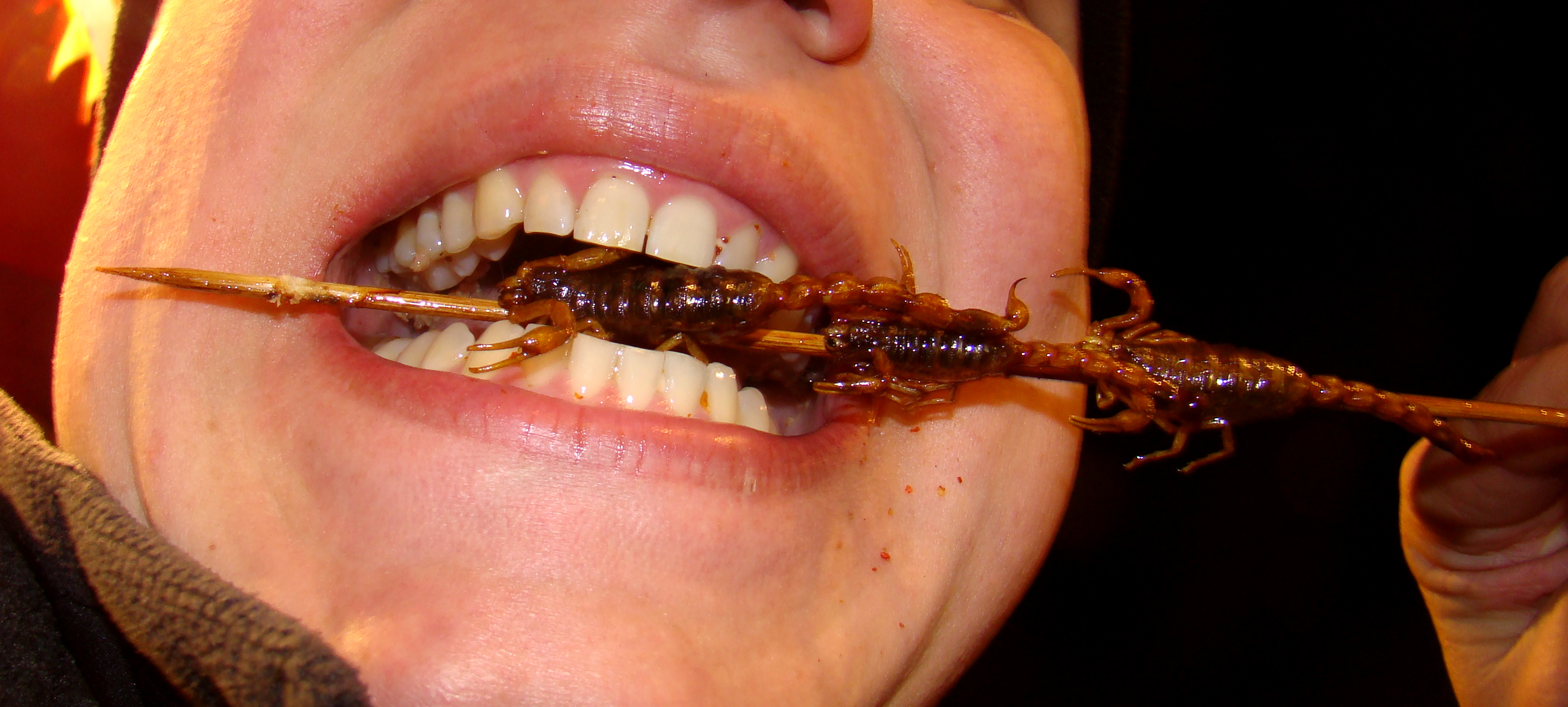
... or other arachnids like scorpions.

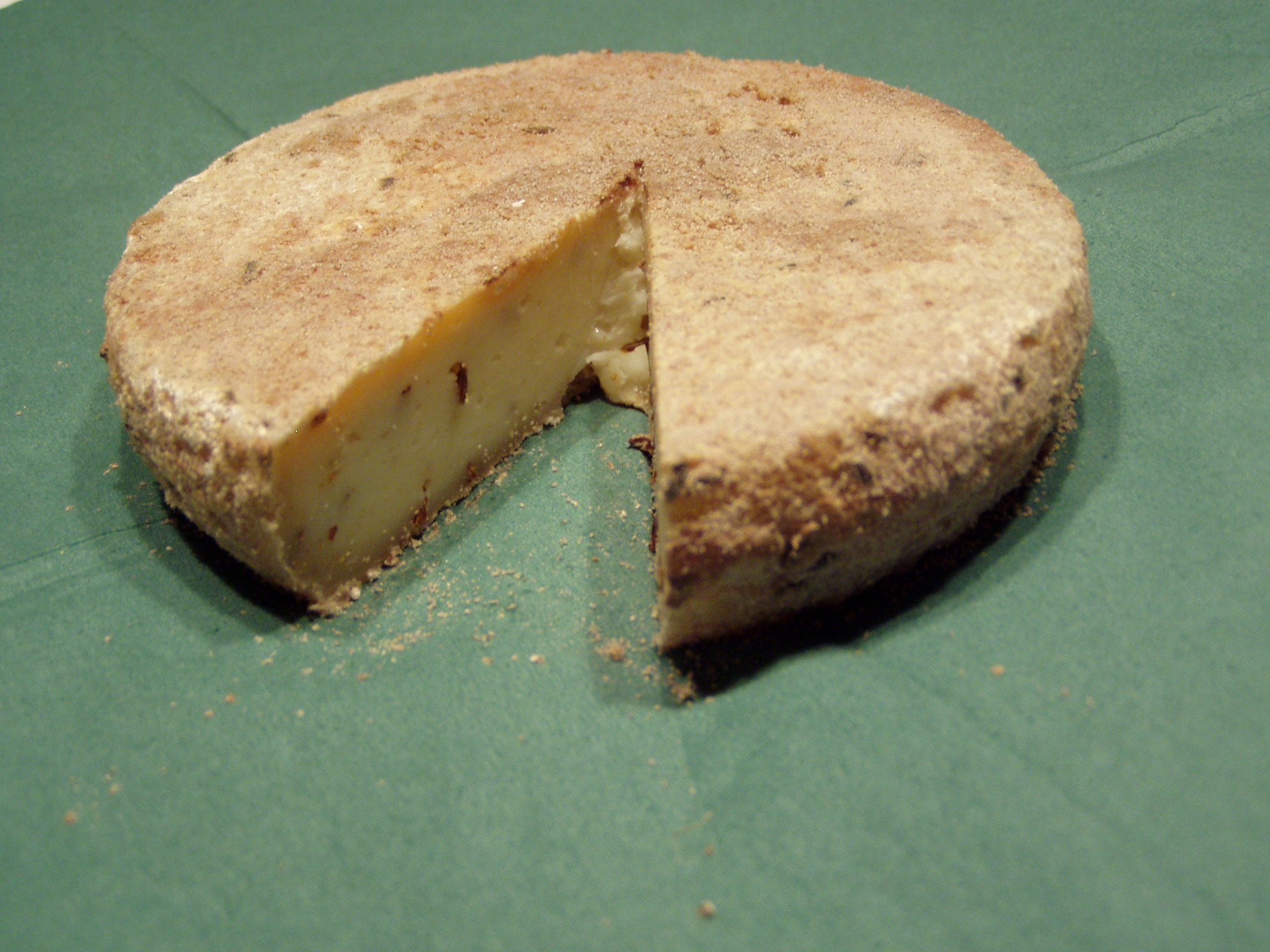
A wheel of young Milbenkäse

Like the human consumption of insects (anthropo-entomophagy), arachnids as well as myriapods also have a history of traditional consumption, either as food or medicine. Arachnids include spiders, scorpions and mites (including ticks) that are consumed by humans worldwide.

Fried spider, primarily tarantula species, is a regional snack in Cambodia. In Mexico, tarantula have been offered in tacos, with a splash of guacamole. However, Mexican law forbids the sale of many species of tarantula for human consumption, and vendors offering this delicacy have been shut down by authorities. In Venezuela, the Piaroa people have a history of eating the Goliath birdeater tarantula (Theraphosa blondi).

Fried scorpion is traditionally eaten in Shandong, China. Other countries include Vietnam and Thailand.

Milbenkäse is a German speciality cheese that is exposed to cheese mites during ripening, and on consumption often still has mites attached to the rind.
