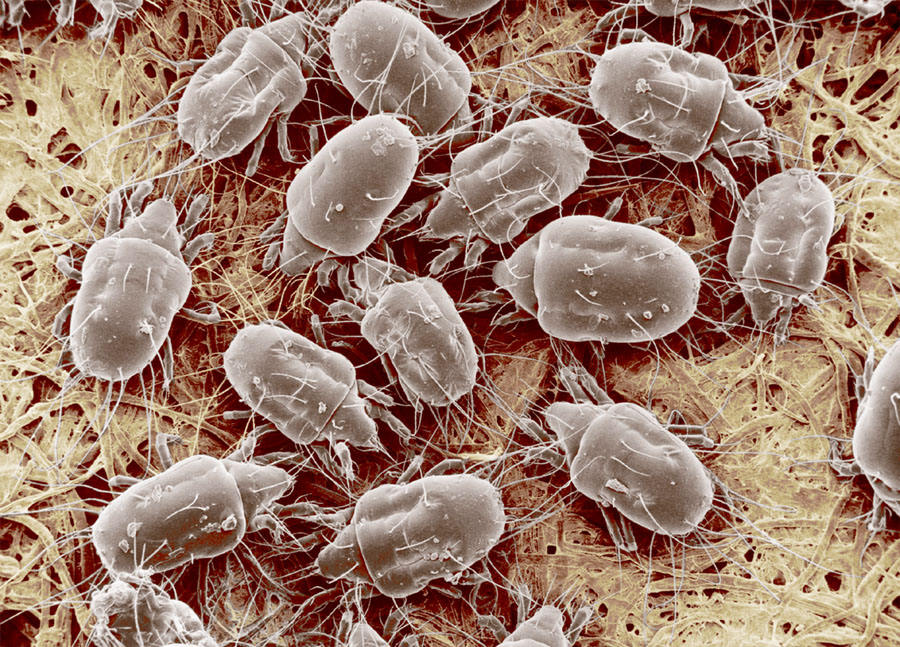

Scientific classification
- Domain: Eukaryota
- Kingdom: Animalia
- Phylum: Arthropoda
- Subphylum: Chelicerata
- Class: Arachnida
- Order: Sarcoptiformes
- Family: Acaridae
- Genus: Tyrophagus
- Species: T. putrescentiae

Binomial name
- Tyrophagus putrescentiae (Schrank, 1781)

Synonyms
- Acarus putrescentiae Schrank, 1781

= Tyrophagus putrescentiae =

Species of mite

Tyrophagus putrescentiae is a cosmopolitan mite species. Together with the related species T. longior, it is commonly referred to as the mould mite or the cheese mite. The genus name translates from Greek to "cheese eater."

== Ecology ==
In the wild, T. putrescentiae occurs throughout the world in a wide range of habitats, including "grasslands, old hay, mushrooms, and the nest of bees and ducks". Under ideal conditions, with temperatures above 30 °C (86 °F) and humidity above 85%, it can complete its life cycle in under three weeks.

It is a common pest of stored products, especially those with a high protein and fat content (meat, cheese, nuts and seeds, dried eggs, etc.). It feeds on the fungi that grow on the foodstuffs, and can become a pest of mycology laboratories.

== Human health ==
Tyrophagus putrescentiae has been identified as the cause of human disease in different regions. It has been found to cause copra itch among people who handle copra in the tropics, skin and respiratory allergies among people handling raw hams in Italy, and dermatitis in an Austrian butcher's shop.

== Taxonomy ==
Tyrophagus putrescentiae was first described by Franz von Paula Schrank in 1781, under the name Acarus putrescentiae. This original description covered both a mite and a springtail, collected from garden soil, flower pots and rotting leaves at an undisclosed location in the Austrian Empire, and provided too little information for the mite to be confidently assigned to any family. In 1906, Anthonie Cornelis Oudemans treated A. putrescentiae as a species "indeterminabilia", but designated it as the type species of his new subgenus Tyrophagus.

The identity of Schrank's species was not fixed until Phyllis Robertson revised the genus Tyrophagus in 1959, and designated a neotype of T. putrescentiae from Oudemans' collections. The International Commission on Zoological Nomenclature approved an application to place T. putrescentiae on its official list of approved names. In 2007, it was discovered that Robertson's concept of the species in fact covered animals belonging to two distinct species, and that the T. putrescentiae had been chosen from the much rarer species. A petition has been made to the Commission to stabilise usage by applying the name T. putrescentiae to the common species; the rare species would then be known as T. fanetzhangorum.
