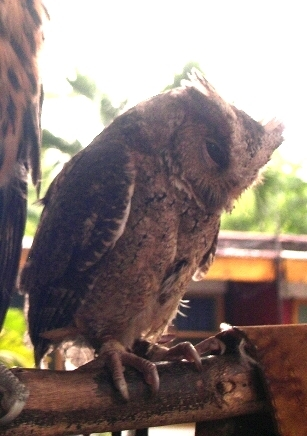
- At Manila Zoo

Conservation status
- Least Concern (IUCN 3.1)
- CITES Appendix II

Scientific classification
- Kingdom: Animalia
- Phylum: Chordata
- Class: Aves
- Order: Strigiformes
- Family: Strigidae
- Genus: Otus
- Species: O. megalotis

Binomial name
- Otus megalotis (Walden, 1875)

= Philippine scops owl =

Species of owl

The Philippine scops owl (Otus megalotis), also Luzon lowland scops owl is a common owl, endemic to the Philippines, belonging to the family of the typical owls Strigidae. Other common names include "Otus Whitehead", "Whitehead scops owl" and "Luzon lowland scops owl". Everett's scops owl (O. everetti) and Negros scops owls (O. nigrorum) were formerly considered conspecific but are now classified as separate species.

Distinguishing features of these birds include their large upright ears from which they get their specific name megalotis, Ancient Greek for "large ears". Philippine scops owls are relatively small, sedentary birds that are naturally found in the forest understory. There are three subspecies which show variations in morphology and are distributed among different islands of the Philippine Archipelago. They are a monogamous species that offer parental care and construct their nest in tree cavities. These owls are ferocious nocturnal carnivores that feed on insects and small mammals. The IUCN Red List considers this species as Least Concern but they may be vulnerable to deforestation and fragmentation.

== Description ==
The Philippine scops owl is a fairly small-to-mid-sized species of owl, but is arguably the largest true species of scops owl. Adults measure from 23 to 28 cm (9.1 to 11.0 in). Their body mass can range from 125 to 310 g (4.4 to 10.9 oz), with females often considerably larger than males. A distinguishing feature of this owl is its large ears that stand upright on its head. They also have big eyes that are dark in the center with a red/orange edge. In general, these owls are covered in dark brown feathers with dark streaks. Their ear-tufts also have a similar pattern. Their forehead is whitish and they have a dark line around their facial disc. There are three subspecies of Philippine scops owl which show three variations in morphology. The smallest subspecies, O. m. nigrorum, has a reddish-brown color, no scapular line, and no feathers on its upper feet. The medium-sized subspecies, O. m. everetti, also lacks a scapular line and feathers on its upper feet but it has a more greyish-brown color. Finally, O. m. megalotis is the largest of all three subspecies and also has a grey-brown color but it shows a scapular line and feathers on its upper feet. Other morphological differences between the subspecies can be seen in the length of the tail, the wings, the culmen and the tarsus. These traits are longer in O. m. megalotis and are shorter in O. m. nigrorum.

There are no significant differences in morphology between male and female Philippine scops owls, although female scops owls tend to be larger in general. The owlets, however, present some contrast as they have fluffy rufous feathers. Once they reach the sub-adult age, they are black and greyish-white until they finally reach adulthood and turn brownish.

== Taxonomy ==
The Philippine scops owl belongs to the Strigiformes order and the Strigidae family (typical owls). The Strigidae family is the largest of the two families of owls and shows a great diversity, with species ranging from 40 g to 40 kg. Key features that distinguish owls of this family from their closest relatives (Tytonidae) are their large eyes and the fact that their facial disk is circular and not heart-shaped. O. megalotis is further classified into the Striginae subfamily according to skull morphology. The Otus genus (scops owls) is one of the largest owl genera, counting approximately 50 species, yet these species are one of the smallest in size. They are all found in the Old World with the exception of one species, the flammulated owl, which is found in North America. A distinguishing feature between this genus and other genera of the Striginae subfamily is vocalization.

The Philippine scops owl is endemic to the Philippine Archipelago. This group of approximately 7,000 islands is prone to speciation and is a great location to study phylogeography. It was formed around 30-35 million years ago and lead to the evolution of different subspecies of O. megalotis. The expansion and contraction of biomes during the last glaciation period as well as the topography in that area lead to isolation of individuals which eventually caused speciation. There are seven Otus species in the Philippines, 5 of which are endemic to islands in the archipelago. These species include O. longicornis, O. mindorensis, O. mirus, O. megalotis and O. fuliginosus. The other two species, O. mantananensis and O. elegans are not endemic to the Philippines. The three O. megalotis subspecies are distributed among different islands of the Philippine Archipelago which suggests they could have evolved through speciation from geographic isolation.

== Habitat and distribution ==
Rainforests, mature secondary woodland forests and forest edges are typical habitats in which Philippine scops owls can be found. They are mostly observed in the understory and rarely go above 1,000 m altitudes, with the exception of individuals which were reported on Mount Data, Luzon. Researchers caught a Philippine scops owl in a net set up at 2 m above ground during their study, which confirms that they are mostly an understory arboreal species.

O. megalotis is endemic to the Philippine Archipelago but the three subspecies are distributed in different locations across the archipelago. O. m. megalotis species is found mostly in the northern islands such as Luzon, Marinduque and Catanduanes. O. m. everetti species exists in the eastern and southern islands including Samar, Biliran, Leyte, Mindanao and Basilan. Finally, O. m. nigrorum species is endemic to Negros Island. These subspecies are not known to migrate and therefore have a limited distribution.

Although they are classified as a species of Least Concern, habitat destruction from deforestation and fragmentation is a major threat to their population as they depend on forests for their survival.

== Behaviour ==
Philippine scops owls are sedentary birds with a limited home range. The fact that different subspecies are found on different islands limits intraspecific competition and allows these birds to have a smaller distribution where all the necessary resources are available.

=== Vocalizations ===
Philippine scops owls are a nocturnal species and vocalize more actively at night. Their song corresponds to "oik oik oik ook" with long and powerful notes that are clearly distinguished from one another. The last "ook" is lower than the previous three notes. Their call sounds completely different with a series of three to six escalating notes that are loud and abrupt. From what is known, there is no difference between the call and the songs of females, males and juveniles.

=== Diet ===
These carnivorous owls prey upon animals such as insects and small mammals. During nighttime, they perch in trees where the land is relatively open, which offers them a better view of the surrounding preys. They are ferocious feeders and specialize in tearing flesh. Their raptorial claws, curved bill and excellent hearing and sighting skill make them powerful predators. They have been observed to kill their victim by crushing its head, then breaking every other bone of the body to finally swallow the animal whole. This method has cost the lives of many juveniles who suffocate because the prey is too large to swallow. Philippine scops owls were also noticed to feed on spider species such as Heteropoda venatoria.

=== Reproduction ===
O. megalotis is often spotted alone but has also been seen in monogamous pairs. Not a lot of information is known about their reproduction but they are thought to breed throughout the year where females will lay 1 or 2 eggs annually. Sexual maturity is reached around the age of 2 but their lifespan is unknown. One juvenile with two adults have been witnessed multiple times, which supports the notion that they are monogamous birds that display care by both parents.

They construct their nests in tree cavities but also among the roots of dead trees on the ground.

== Conservation status ==
The International Union for Conservation of Nature has assessed this bird as a Least-concern species as it has a large range and is still locally common in some areas. However, despite not being a threatened species, the population is believed to be on the decline. This species' main threat is habitat loss with wholesale clearance of forest habitats as a result of logging, agricultural conversion and mining activities occurring within the range. It is also caught for the pet trade.

Occurs in a many protected areas in Bataan National Park, Bulusan Volcano Natural Park, Angat Watershed Forest Reserve and Northern Sierra Madre Natural Park. While all of these areas are protected by law, deforestation, mining, hunting and habitat loss still continue in some of these protected areas.

== Gallery ==
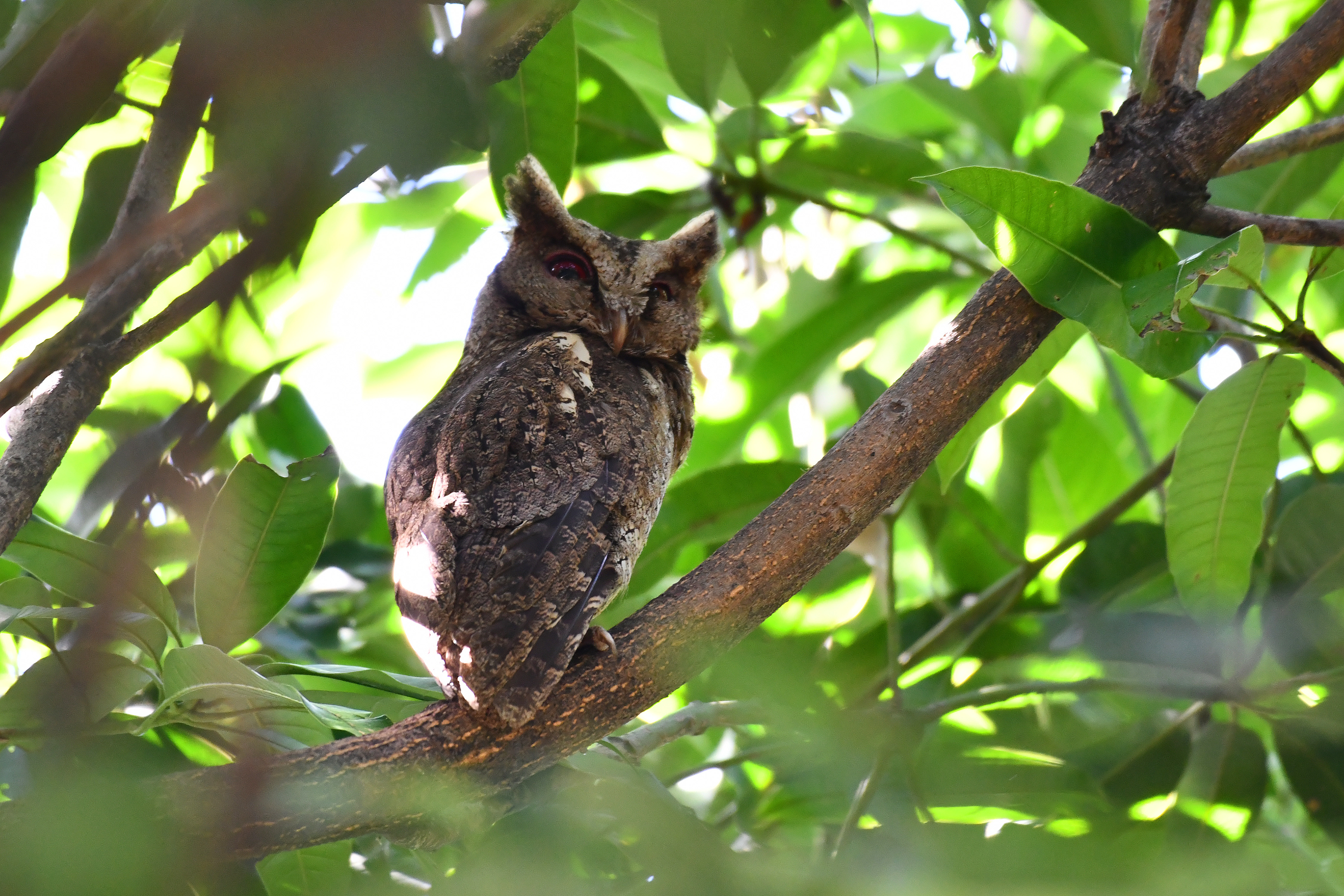
Philippine scops owl

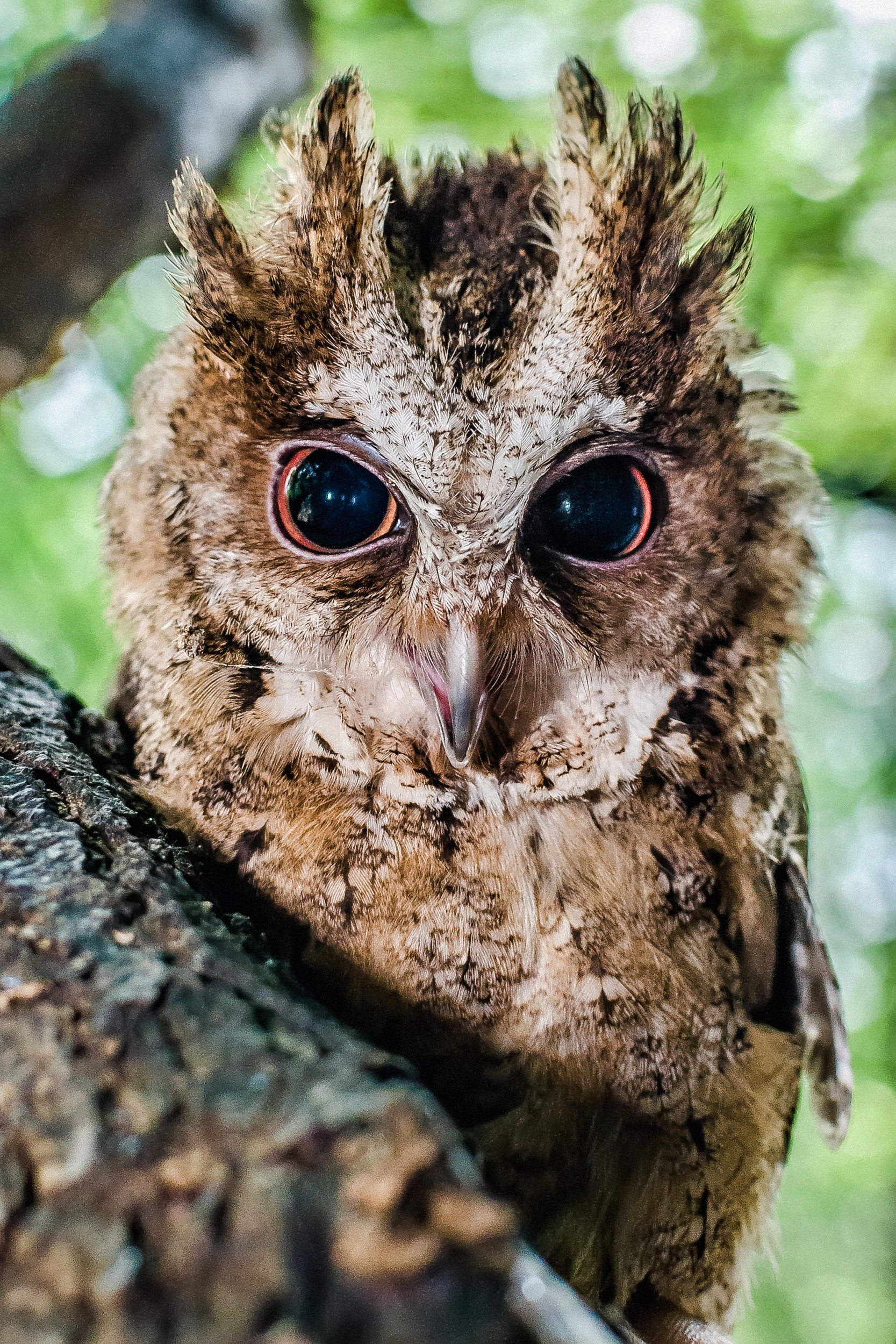
Philippine scops owl, Prague Zoo
