= Würchwitz =

- Stadtteil of Zeitz
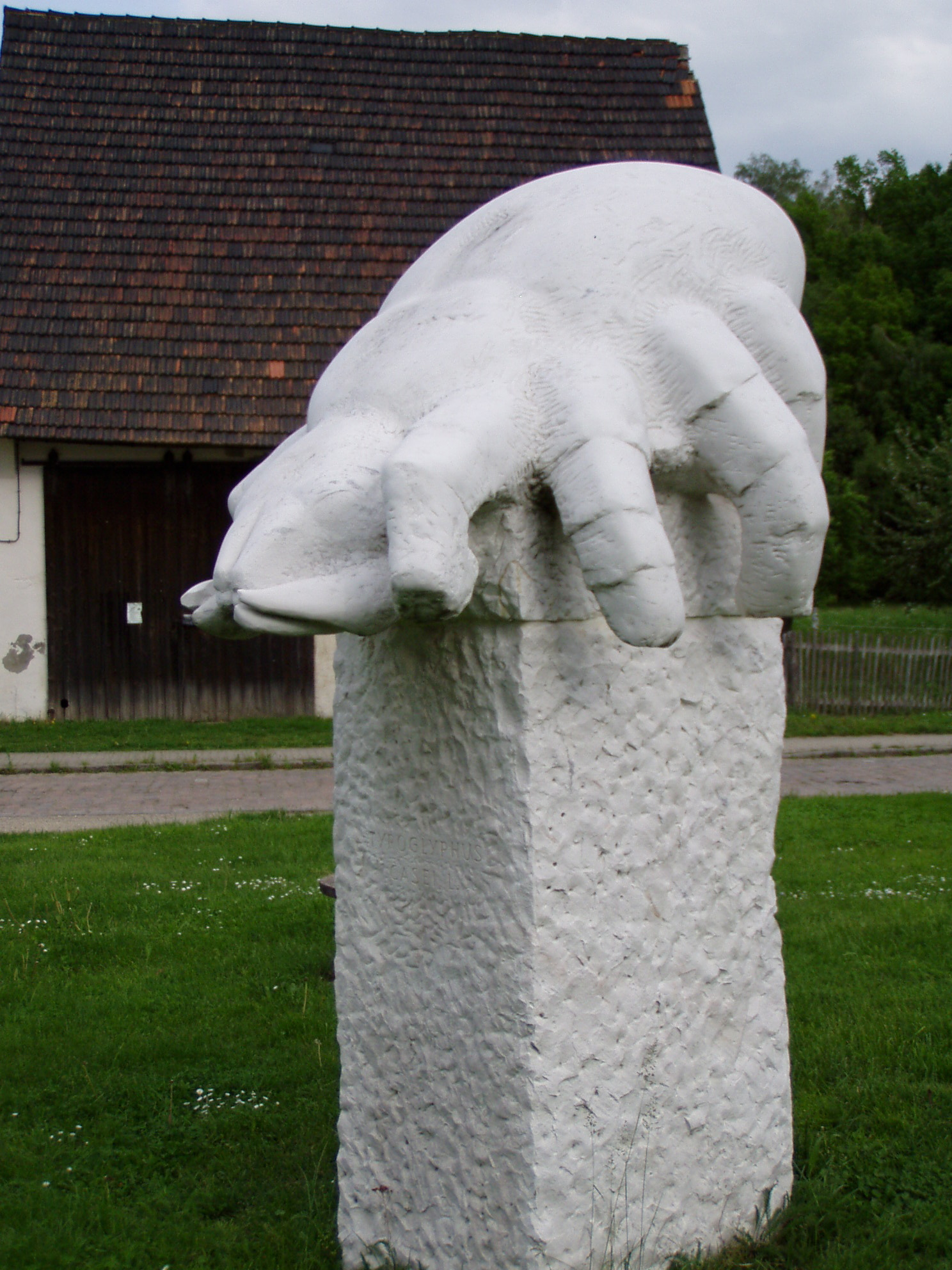
- The cheese mite statue at Würchwitz
- Interactive map of Würchwitz
- Location within Germany Location within Saxony-Anhalt
- Coordinates: 51°1′3″N 12°13′39″E
- Country: Germany
- State: Saxony-Anhalt
- District: Burgenlandkreis
- Town: Zeitz

Area
  - Total: 14.17 km^{2} (5.47 sq mi)
- Elevation: 195 m (640 ft)

Population (2006-12-31)
  - Total: 642
  - Density: 45.3/km^{2} (117/sq mi)
- Time zone: UTC+01:00 (CET)
  - Summer (DST): UTC+02:00 (CEST)
- Postal codes: 06712
- Dialling codes: 034426
- Vehicle registration: BLK
- Website: www.zeitz.de

Würchwitz is a village and former municipality in the Burgenlandkreis district, in Saxony-Anhalt, Germany. Since 1 July 2009, it has been officially part of the town of Zeitz as one of its Stadtteile (quarters). It is the only place in the world that produces Milbenkäse (mite cheese), a German speciality cheese which dates back to the Middle Ages.
