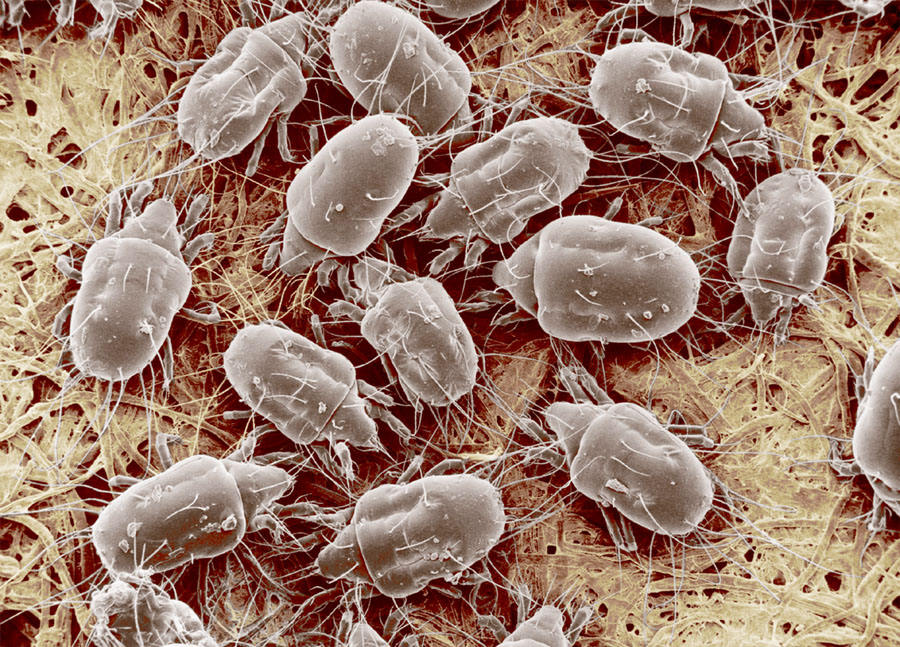
- Cheese mite (Tyrophagus putrescentiae)

Scientific classification
- Domain: Eukaryota
- Kingdom: Animalia
- Phylum: Arthropoda
- Subphylum: Chelicerata
- Class: Arachnida
- Order: Sarcoptiformes
- Family: Acaridae
- Subfamily: Acarinae
- Genus: Tyrophagus; Oudemans, 1924

= Tyrophagus =

Genus of mites

Tyrophagus is a genus of mites in the family Acaridae.

== Species ==
- Tyrophagus casei Oudemans, 1910
- Tyrophagus curvipenis Fain & Fauvel, 1993
- Tyrophagus debrivorus Chinniah & Mohanasundaram, 1996
- Tyrophagus glossinarum Fain, 1985
- Tyrophagus houstoni (Fain, 1986)
- Tyrophagus jingdezhenensis Jiang-Zhenta, 1993
- Tyrophagus lini Oudemans, 1924
- Tyrophagus longior (Gervais, 1844)
- Tyrophagus mimlongior Jiang, 1993
- Tyrophagus neiswanderi Johnson & Bruce, 1965
- Tyrophagus neotropicus (Oudemans, 1917)
- Tyrophagus palmarum Oudemans, 1924
- Tyrophagus perniciosus Zakhvatkin, 1941
- Tyrophagus putrescentiae (Schrank, 1781)
- Tyrophagus robertsonae Lynch, 1989
- Tyrophagus savasi Lynch, 1989
- Tyrophagus similis Volgin, 1949
- Tyrophagus tropicus Robertson, 1959

== See also ==
- Cheese mite
