= Arachnids as food =

Some arachnids may be used for human consumption (edible arachnids), either whole or as an ingredient in processed food products such as cheese (Milbenkäse). Arachnids include spiders, scorpions, and mites (including ticks).

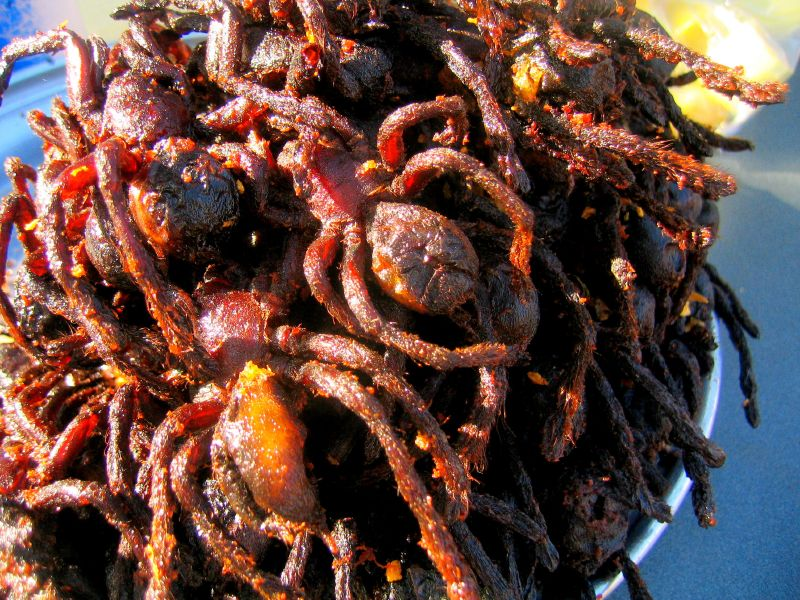
Fried spiders for sale at the market in Skuon

== Spiders ==
About 15 species of spiders are scientifically described as being edible, with a history of human consumption. These edible spiders include:

- Thailand zebra leg tarantula (Cyriopagopus albostriatus) which is sold fried as traditional snack in Cambodia and Thailand;
- Thailand Black (Cyriopagopus minax);
- Goliath birdeater (Theraphosa blondi);
- several other species of tarantula;
- the golden orb-weaving spider (Trichonephila edulis) that is eaten in New Caledonia and is said to taste like pâté.

== Scorpions ==
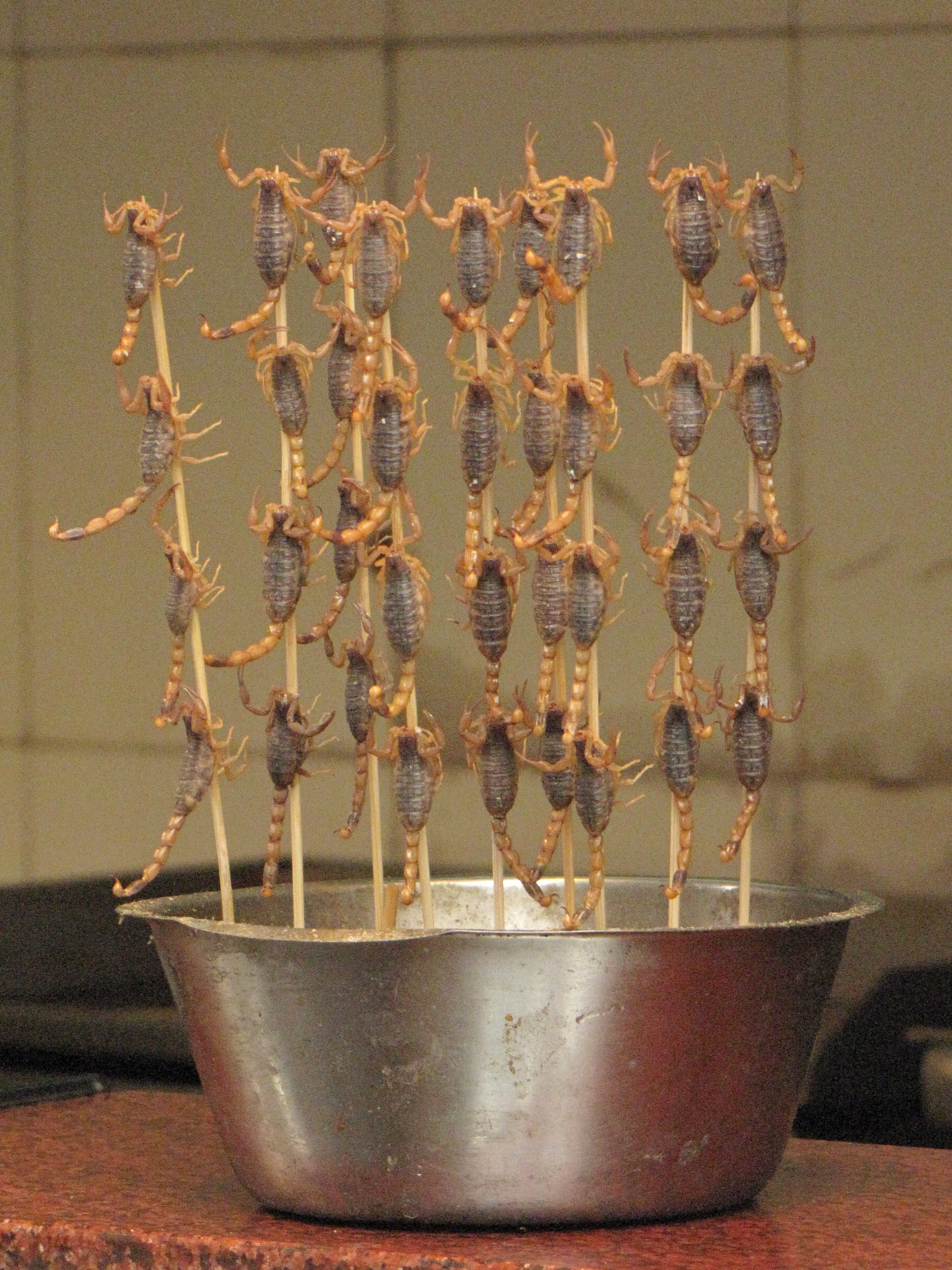
Fried scorpions for sale at food market in Beijing

Fried scorpion is traditionally eaten in Shandong, China.

== Mites ==
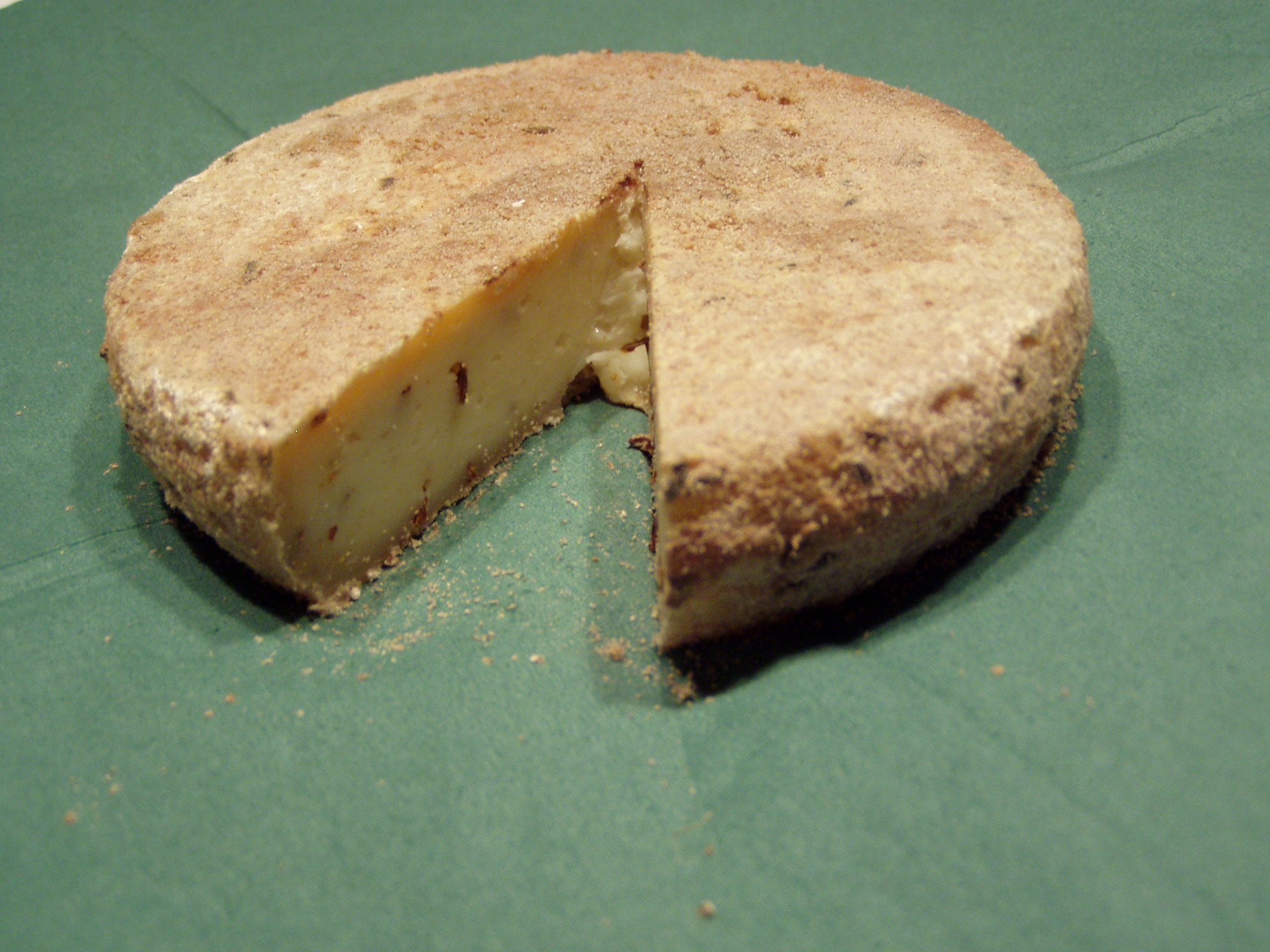
A wheel of young Milbenkäse

Milbenkäse (mite cheese) is a German speciality cheese.

Mimolette is a mite cheese traditionally produced around the city of Lille, France.

Cheese mites could cause an allergic reaction if consumed in large quantities (above the standard of six mites per cubic inch).

== Processing ==
Typical processing of arachnids as food includes heating, defanging and, in certain cases, drying and grinding.
