= Fried spider =

Regional delicacy in Cambodia

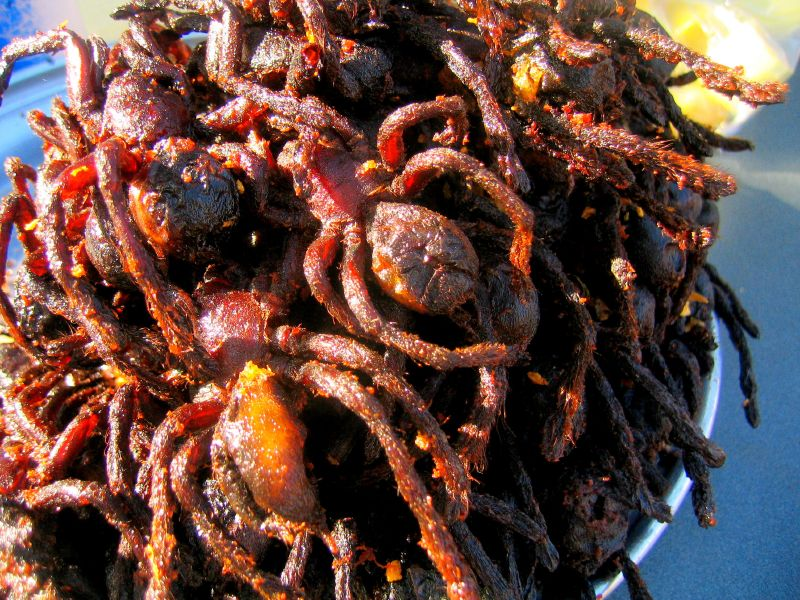
Fried spiders for sale at a market in Skuon ("Spiderville")

Fried spider (Khmer: រពីងបំពង) is a regional snack in Cambodia. In the Cambodian town of Skuon, Cheung Prey, Kampong Cham, the vending of fried spiders as a specialty snack is a popular attraction for tourists. Spiders are also available elsewhere in Cambodia – in Phnom Penh for instance – but Skuon, a market town on the highway 75 kilometres (47 mi) from the capital, is the centre of their popularity. The spiders are bred in holes in the ground in villages north of Skuon, or foraged for in nearby forestland, and fried in oil. It is not clear how this practice started, but some have suggested that the population might have started eating spiders out of desperation during the years of Khmer Rouge rule, when food was in short supply.

The spiders are a species of tarantula called "a-ping" in Khmer, and are about the size of a human palm. The snacks cost about 300 riel each in 2002, or about US$ 0.08. One travel book identifies them as Haplopelma albostriatum, known colloquially as the Thailand zebra leg tarantula, and notes that the same species' common name has been the "edible spider" for more than a hundred years. The popularity of the dish is, however, a recent phenomenon, starting perhaps as late as the 1990s. The same book details a recipe: the spiders are tossed in a mixture of MSG, sugar, and salt; crushed garlic is fried in oil until fragrant, then the spiders are added and fried alongside the garlic until "the legs are almost completely stiff, by which time the contents of the abdomen are not so runny."

The taste has been described as bland, "rather like a cross between chicken and cod", with a contrast in texture from a crispy exterior to a soft centre. The legs contain little flesh, while the head and thorax have "a delicate white meat inside". The abdomen is often not consumed, however, as it contains a brown paste consisting of organs, possibly eggs, and excrement. Some people call it a delicacy while others recommend not eating it.

In Mexico, tarantulas have been offered in tacos, with a serving of guacamole. However, Mexican law forbids the sale of many species of tarantula for human consumption, and vendors offering this item have been shut down by the authorities.

== See also ==
- Arachnids as food
- Arachnophagy
- Milbenkäse
