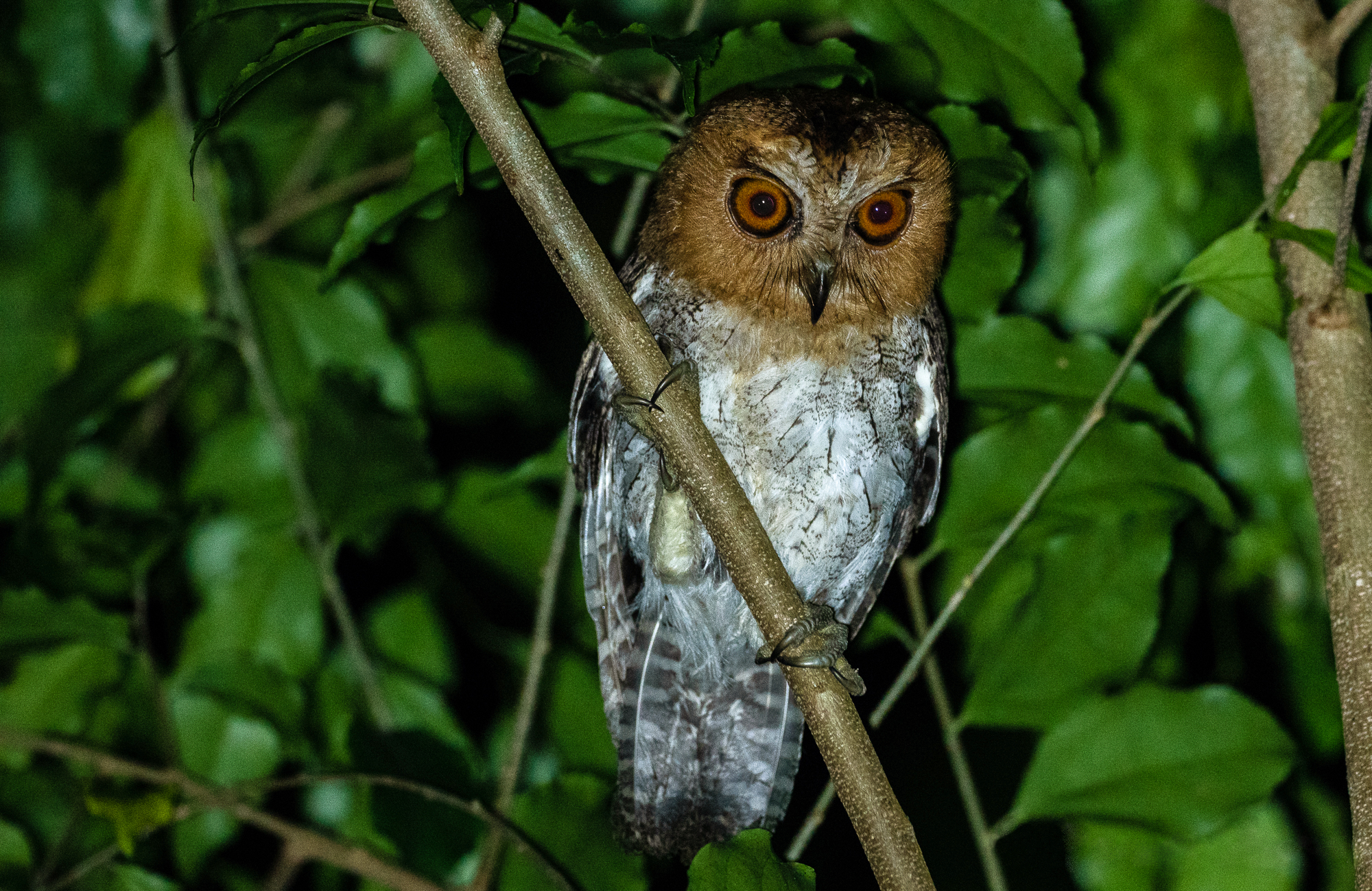

Conservation status
- Near Threatened (IUCN 3.1)
- CITES Appendix II

Scientific classification
- Kingdom: Animalia
- Phylum: Chordata
- Class: Aves
- Order: Strigiformes
- Family: Strigidae
- Genus: Otus
- Species: O. nigrorum

Binomial name
- Otus nigrorum Rand, 1950

= Negros scops owl =

Species of owl

The Negros scops owl (Otus nigrorum), also known as the Visayan scops owl, is an owl, endemic to the islands of Negros and Panay in the Philippines, belonging to the family of the typical owls Strigidae. It has a distinct and striking rufous or reddish brown crown, nape and face. It was formerly classified as a subspecies of the Philippine scops owl. It is threatened by habitat loss and hunting for the pet trade.

== Description and taxonomy ==
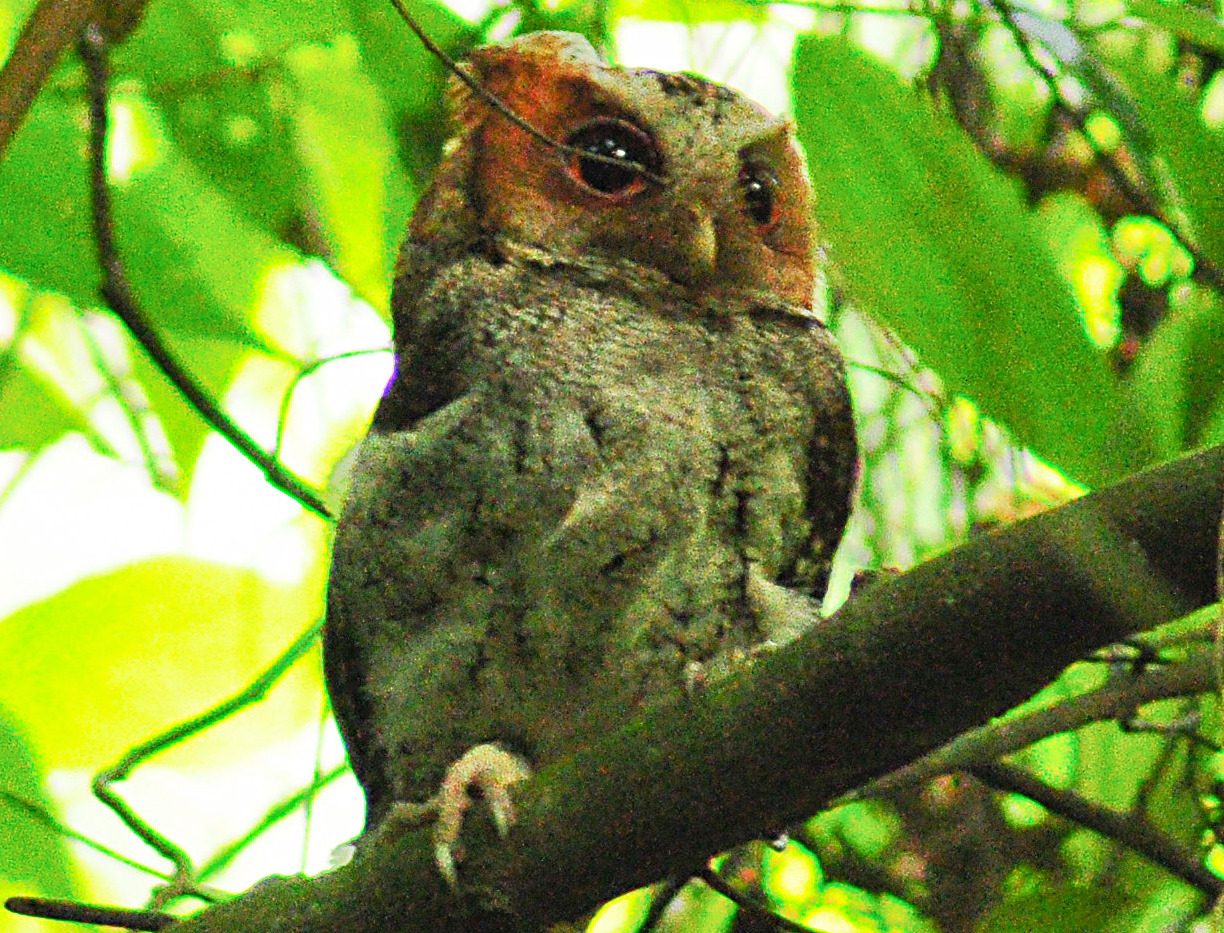
A roosting Negros scops owl in Liptong Woodland

This is a small species of owl found in the forests of Negros and Panay. It has orange eyes and face, a white brow and pale gray belly.

It was formerly conspecific with the Philippine scops owl and the Everett's scops owl. It is the smallest and palest of the endemic Philippine scops owl complex. It also has a distinct rufous crown and facial disc and its upper foot is not feathered. It is also the smallest in the Philippine scops owl complex.

Its song is described as a rapid series of upward yelps

== Ecology and behaviour ==
Negros scops owls prey at night on insects. They live alone or in monogamous pairs. They breed throughout the year, laying clutches of 1 or 2 eggs. They nest in tree hollows in forests of the Philippine lowlands.

== Habitat and conservation status ==
Its natural habitats are tropical moist lowland and montane primary and secondary forest up to 1,000 meters above sea level. While they can tolerate secondary forest, they have the highest population densities and health in primary (old-growth) forest.

As of 2025, this species is assessed as Near-threatened species by the International Union for Conservation of Nature. The population is believed to be declining, with populations estimated at between 2,500 and 9,999 mature individuals. Prior to 2025, this species was listed Vulnerable species. Its main threat is habitat destruction through both legal and Illegal logging, conversion into farmlands through slash-and-burn, charcoal burning, and mining. Habitat loss on both Negros and Panay has been extensive. By 2007, Negros and Panay had a 3% and 6% remaining forest cover with a huge chunk of this being in higher elevation forests where this bird does not thrive. Despite the already paltry numbers, these figures are still continuing to decline due to the above-mentioned threats.

There are currently no species-specific conservation plans. It occurs in a few protected areas in Northern Negros Natural Park, Mount Kanlaon National Park and Northwest Panay Peninsula Natural Park. However, as with most areas in the Philippines, protection from hunting and illegal logging is lax.

Two-thirds of all EBird records of this species by birdwatchers in the Liptong Woodland, a private reforestation project owned by Rene Vendiola in Valencia, Negros Oriental. This area is just 2 hectares but supports multiple pairs of owls.
