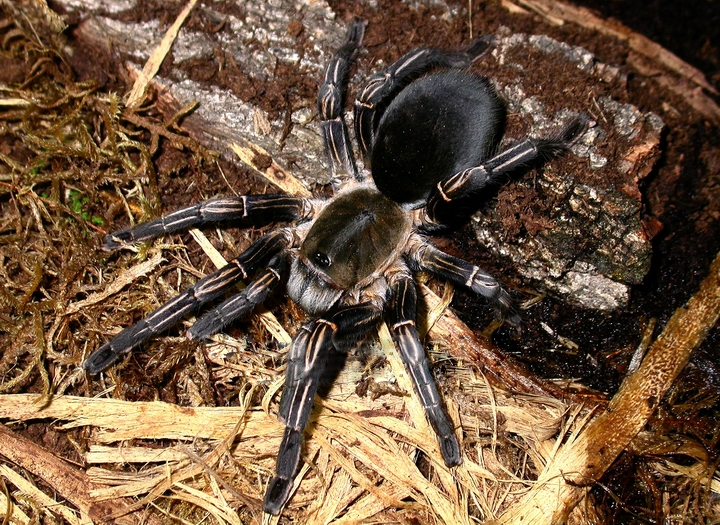

Scientific classification
- Kingdom: Animalia
- Phylum: Arthropoda
- Subphylum: Chelicerata
- Class: Arachnida
- Order: Araneae
- Infraorder: Mygalomorphae
- Family: Theraphosidae
- Genus: Cyriopagopus
- Species: C. albostriatus

Binomial name
- Cyriopagopus albostriatus (Simon, 1886)

Synonyms
- Selenocosmia albostriata Simon, 1886; Melopoeus albostriatus (Simon, 1886); Haplopelma albostriatum (Simon, 1886)

= Cyriopagopus albostriatus =

Species of spider

Melopoeus albostriatus, commonly known as zebra leg tarantula is a species of spider in the family Theraphosidae, found in Myanmar, Thailand, and Cambodia.

== Name ==
Its name comes from the Latin prefix albo, meaning white, and the Latin word striatus, meaning lines or striped.

== Description ==
It is a moderately large fossorial species, which spends most of its time in a burrow.

This species has white stripes going down each leg, and a white zig-zag pattern on its opisthosoma (abdomen). These patterns on a black background have earned it the common name Thai zebra tarantula. This tarantula is very skittish and defensive, and it can also be very aggressive. It is an Old World tarantula, so has no urticating hairs; its only defenses are biting and fleeing. This tarantula is known to have more potent venom than many tarantula species, but Cyriopagopus albostriatus venom was shown in a study to have the ability to regulate activity in voltage-gated sodium channels, which are promising therapeutic targets for people with chronic pain. This suggests potential for the venom of this tarantula to be an analgesic treatment.

== As food ==
Cyriopagopus albostriatus is edible and used as food. When fried, these spiders are sold on the streets of Cambodia. Cooked correctly, C. albostriatus is high in protein.
