= Coolie itch =

- Specialty: Dermatology

Coolie itch is a cutaneous condition caused by Rhizoglyphus parasiticus, characterized by an intense pruritus. It is found in India on tea plantations and causes sore feet.

Rhizoglyphus parasiticus is a type of mite.

== See also ==
- Copra itch
- Skin lesion
