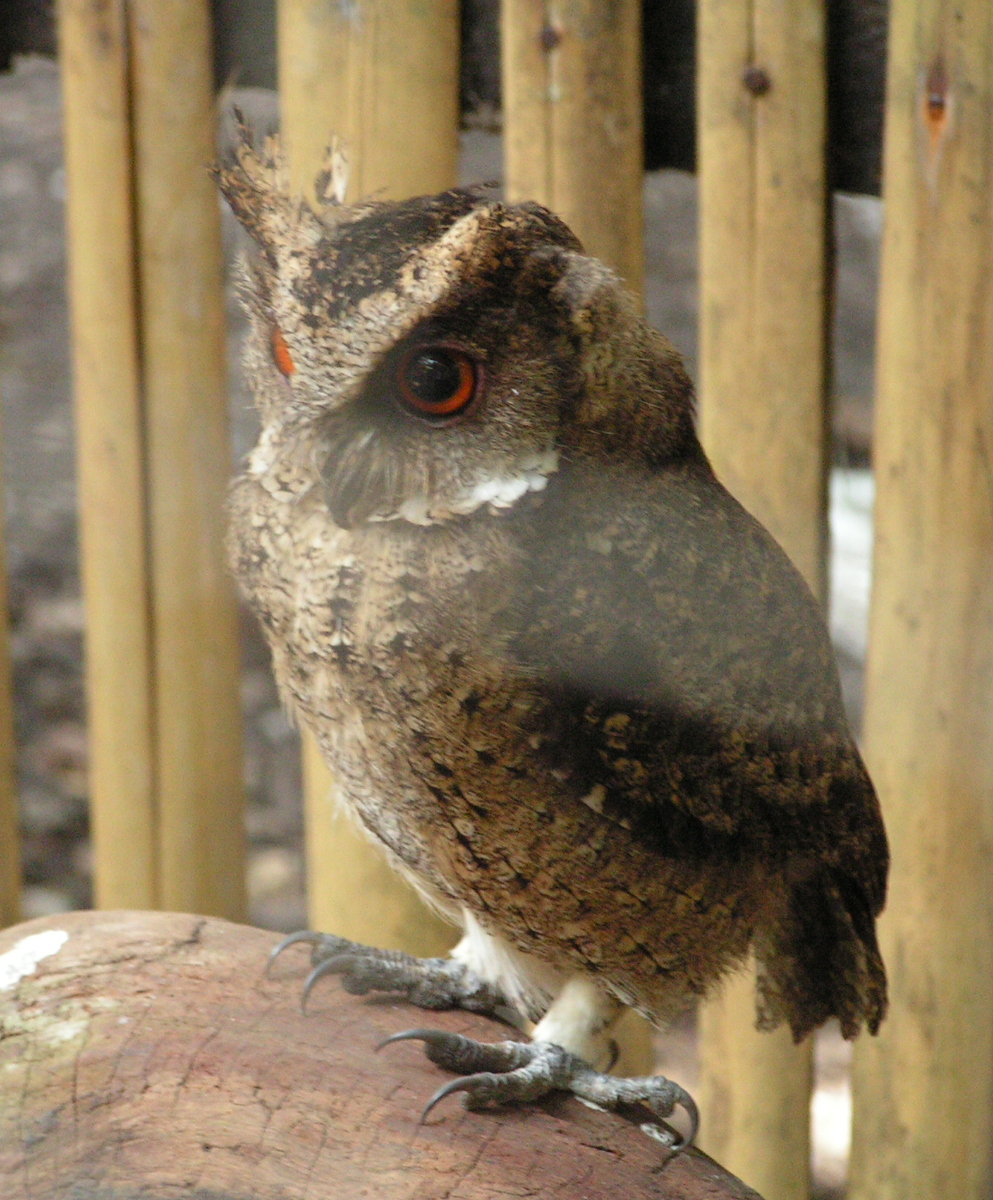

Conservation status
- Least Concern (IUCN 3.1)
- CITES Appendix II

Scientific classification
- Kingdom: Animalia
- Phylum: Chordata
- Class: Aves
- Order: Strigiformes
- Family: Strigidae
- Genus: Otus
- Species: O. everetti

Binomial name
- Otus everetti (Tweeddale, 1879)

= Everett's scops owl =

Species of owl

Everett's scops owl (Otus everetti), also called Midanao lowland scops-owl is an owl species endemic to the Philippines. They are found on Bohol, Samar, Biliran, Leyte, Mindanao and Basilan. This species is part of the Philippine scops owl species complex which includes the Negros scops owl.

== Description and taxonomy ==
Everett's scops owl was part of the Philippine scops owl (O. megalotis) species complex, which also included the Negros scops owl (O. nigrorum), but these species were split following genetic analyses. O. everetti is differentiated by its darker plumage, face and darker orange eyes. This is species is monotypic.

== Ecology and behavior ==
Not much is known about this owl but they are presumed to have similar habits to other closely related scops owls. Their diet is presumed to be insects, small mammals, reptiles, and amphibians.

They live alone or in monogamous pairs. They breed throughout the year, laying clutches of 1 or 2 eggs. They nest in tree hollows in forests of the Philippine lowlands.

== Habitat and conservation status ==
It is found in tropical moist lowland forest and the lower reaches of montane forest until 1,550 meters above sea level it is replaced by the smaller Mindanao scops owl. Typically roosts in dense bamboo groves during the daytime.

IUCN has assessed this bird as least-concern species but the population is decreasing. This species' main threat is habitat loss with wholesale clearance of forest habitats as a result of logging, agricultural conversion and mining activities occurring within the range. The most affected part of its range is Bohol which only has 4% forest cover remaining.

Occurs in a few protected areas like Pasonanca Natural Park, Mount Apo and Mount Kitanglad on Mindanao, Rajah Sikatuna Protected Landscape in Bohol and Samar Island Natural Park but actual protection and enforcement of laws surrounding illegal logging and hunting are lacking.
