= Casu martzu =

Traditional Sardinian cheese

Casu martzu (Sardinian) Casgiu merzu (Corsican) Rotten cheese
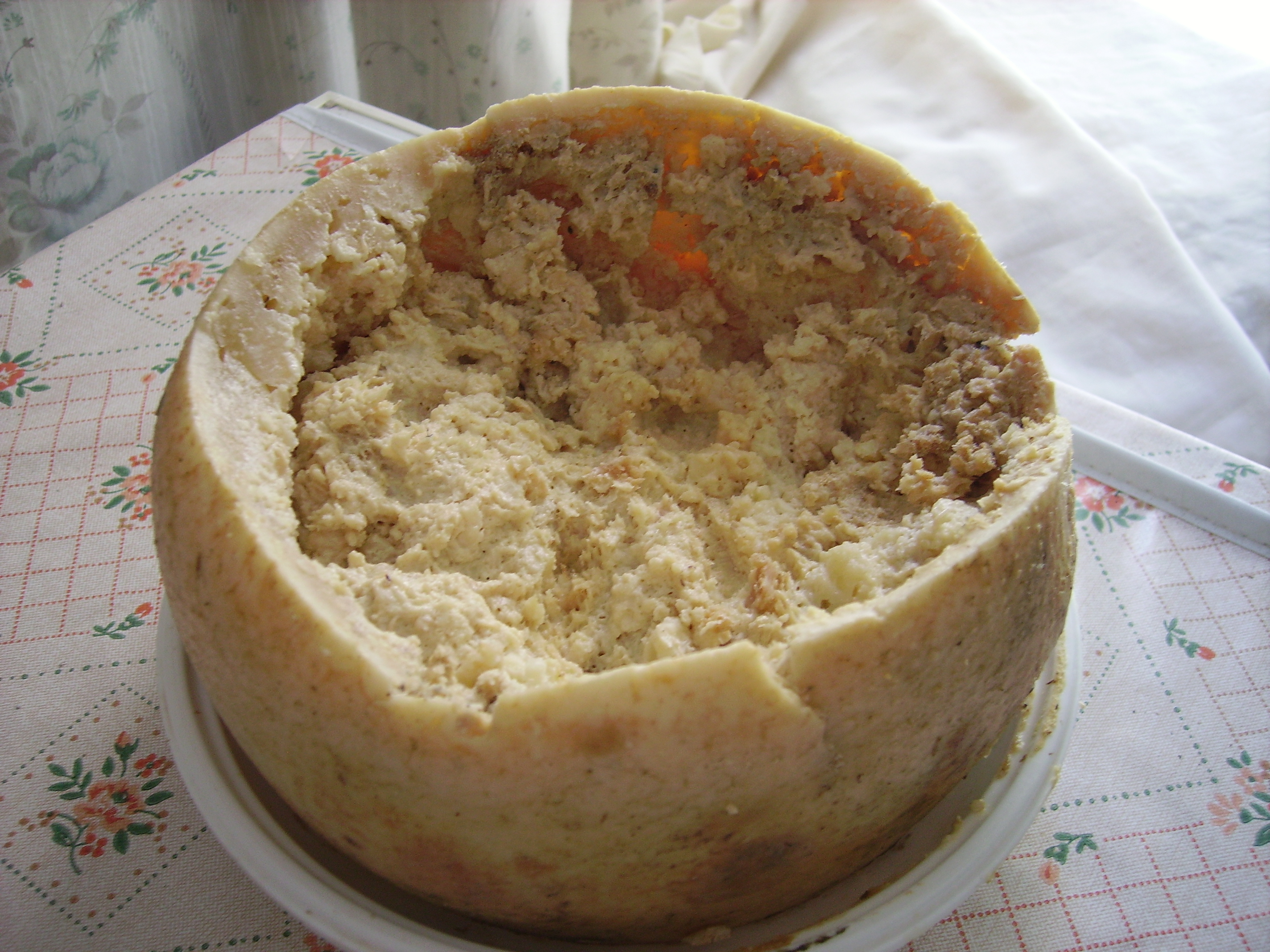
- Other names: Casu marzu, casu modde, casu cundídu, casu fràzigu
- Country of origin: Italy
- Region: Sardinia
- Source of milk: Sheep
- Pasteurised: No
- Texture: Soft
- Aging time: 3 months
- Certification: None

Casu martzu (Sardinian: [ˈkazu ˈmaɾtsu]; lit. 'rotten cheese') is a Sardinian sheep milk cheese that contains live fly maggots.

The larvae of the cheese fly (Piophila casei) are deliberately introduced to pecorino cheese, where their digestive action produces an advanced level of fermentation, including a breakdown of the cheese's fats. The cheese's texture softens, and a liquid called làgrima ('teardrop') may seep out.

It is possible that the larvae could survive in the intestine, causing enteric pseudomyiasis, which can manifest as nausea, vomiting and gastrointestinal upset; however, no cases have been linked to the cheese. Additionally, these larvae can carry harmful microorganisms that may lead to infections. Due to these risks, Italian authorities have banned the sale of this cheese, deeming it dangerous. Consequently, it is also prohibited across the European Union, as EU food safety regulations mandate that only food safe for consumption can be sold.

Variations of this cheese also exist in Corsica, France, where it is called casgiu merzu; it is especially produced in some Southern Corsican villages such as Sartène.

== Fermentation ==
Casu martzu is created by leaving whole pecorino cheeses outside with part of the rind removed to allow the cheese fly Piophila casei to lay eggs in the cheese. When the eggs hatch, the larvae begin to eat through the cheese. The acid from the maggots' digestive system breaks down the cheese's fats, making the texture of the cheese very soft. By the time it is ready for consumption, a typical casu martzu will contain thousands of maggots. Pecorino is most desirable if made from milk collected towards the end of June, due to the effects of the reproductive cycle of sheep on their lactation, and local fermentation traditions associate higher quality casu martzu with exposure to a warm sirocco wind, which is thought to additionally soften the cheese to encourage further maggot activity. The overall fermentation process takes a total of three months.

== Consumption ==
Casu martzu is considered by Sardinian aficionados to be unsafe to eat if the maggots in the cheese have died. Allowances are made for cheese that has been refrigerated, which also quickly kills the maggots. Some people prefer not to ingest the maggots. They might place the cheese in a sealed paper bag, starving the maggots of oxygen. Modern preservation techniques have expanded the cheese's shelf life to several years, where it would previously be unobtainable outside of late summer and early autumn.

When the cheese has fermented enough, it is often cut into thin strips and spread on moistened Sardinian flatbread (pane carasau), to be served with a strong red wine such as cannonau. The flavor is described as "intense", with Mediterranean, pastoral, and spicy notes. The aftertaste is strong enough to remain for hours after a single serving. Because the larvae in the cheese can launch themselves distances up to 15 centimetres (6 in) when disturbed, diners hold their hands above the sandwich to prevent the maggots from leaping.

== Health concerns ==
It is possible for the larvae to survive the stomach acid and remain in the intestine, leading to a condition called pseudomyiasis. There have been documented cases of pseudomyiasis with P. casei, although a report by CNN claims no such cases have been linked to casu marzu. The larvae may also carry harmful microorganisms that could cause infections.

A cooperation between sheep farmers and researchers at the University of Sassari developed a hygienic method of production in 2005, aiming to allow the legal selling of the cheese.

Guinness World Records listed casu martzu as the world's "most dangerous cheese" in 2009, citing the risk that live larvae can survive digestion and provoke vomiting, abdominal pain, and bloody diarrhea.

== History and legal status ==
An Italian journalist for CNN described casu martzu's cultural status as "revered", and the unique cheesemaking process combined with the strong, rare taste of the dish are described as icons of the traditional Sardinian pastoral lifestyle. Local gastronome Giovanni Fancello traced the history of Sardinian cuisine to the island's time as a province of the Roman Empire, arguing that "we have always eaten worms, Pliny the Elder and Aristotle talked about it... It's part of our history. We are the sons of this food." Casu martzu is traditionally believed to be an aphrodisiac by Sardinians and the shepherding, milking, and fermentation necessary for the dish feature heavily in the island's superstition and mysticism.

The Italian government challenged the sale of casu martzu as early as 1962, when it was prohibited under laws against the sale of infested food. Because of European Union food hygiene-health regulations, the cheese has been outlawed, and offenders face heavy fines. Despite this, the laws are sometimes not enforced, and some Sardinians organized themselves in order to make casu martzu available on the black market, where it may be sold for double the price of an ordinary block of pecorino cheese. As of 2019, the illegal production of this cheese was estimated at 100 tonnes (98 long tons; 110 short tons) per year, worth between €2–3 million.

Attempts have been made to circumvent the Italian and EU ban by having casu martzu declared a traditional food. The traditional way of making the cheese is explained by an official paper of the Sardinian government.

Casu martzu is among several cheeses that are not legal in the United States.

== Other regional variations ==
Outside of Sardinia, similar milk cheeses are also produced in the French island of Corsica, as a local variation of the Sardinian cheese produced in some Southern villages and known as casgiu merzu or casgiu sartinesu, as well as in a number of Italian regions.

- Brös ch'a marcia in Piedmont;
- Cacie' Punt (formaggio punto) in Molise;
- Casu puntu in Salento (Apulia);
- Casu du quagghiu in Calabria;
- Frmag punt in Apulia;
- Furmai nis (formaggio nisso) in Emilia-Romagna;
- Gorgonzola coi grilli in Liguria;
- Marcetto or cace fraceche in Abruzzo;
- Salterello in Friuli-Venezia Giulia.

Several other regional varieties of cheese with fly larvae are produced in the rest of Europe. For example, goat-milk cheese is left to the open air until P. casei eggs are naturally laid in the cheese. Then it is aged in white wine, with grapes and honey, preventing the larvae from emerging, giving the cheese a strong flavour. In addition, other regions in Europe have traditional cheeses that rely on live arthropods for ageing and flavouring, such as the German Milbenkäse and French Mimolette, both of which rely on cheese mites. An early printed reference to Stilton cheese points to a similar production technique. Daniel Defoe in his 1724 work A Tour thro' the Whole Island of Great Britain notes: "We pass'd Stilton, a town famous for cheese, which is call'd our English Parmesan, and is brought to table with the mites or maggots round it, so thick, that they bring a spoon with them for you to eat the mites with, as you do the cheese."

According to Rabbi Chaim Simons of the Orthodox Union, kosher casu martzu can be produced provided that all ingredients are kosher, the rennet comes from a kosher animal slaughtered in accordance with the laws of shechita, and that the cheese is "gevinat Yisrael" (made under Jewish supervision).

== See also ==
- Cuisine of Sardinia
- List of Italian cheeses
- List of sheep milk cheeses
- Insects as food
