= Copra itch =

Skin condition caused by parasitic mites

- Specialty: Dermatology

Copra itch is a skin condition that occurs on persons handling copra who are subject to Tyrophagus longior mite bites.

== See also ==
- Coolie itch
- Skin lesion
