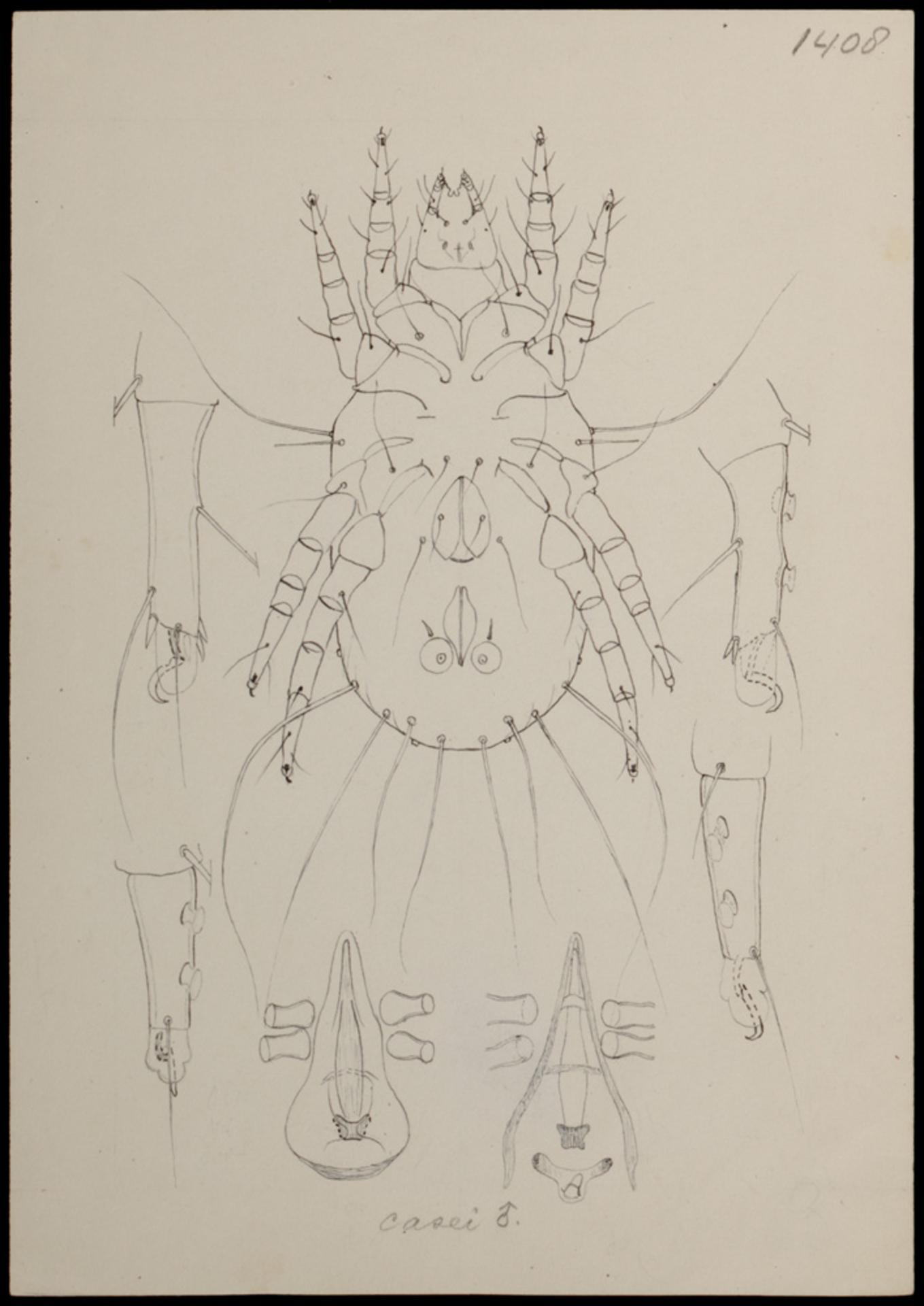

Scientific classification
- Kingdom: Animalia
- Phylum: Arthropoda
- Subphylum: Chelicerata
- Class: Arachnida
- Order: Sarcoptiformes
- Family: Acaridae
- Genus: Tyrophagus
- Species: T. casei

Binomial name
- Tyrophagus casei (Oudemans, 1910)

Synonyms
- Tyrolichus casei Oudemans, 1910

= Tyrophagus casei =

Species of mite

Tyrophagus casei, the cheese mite, is a species of mite which is inoculated into Milbenkäse and Altenburger Ziegenkäse cheese during their production. It is 0.45–0.70 millimetres (0.018–0.028 in) long, and feeds on cheese, corn, flour, old honeycombs, bird collections, and smoked meats.

The surface of cheese which has been colonised by mites may be covered with a fine, grey powder or bloom, due to the mites themselves and their moulted skin and faeces. These impart a distinctive "piquant" taste to various cheeses.

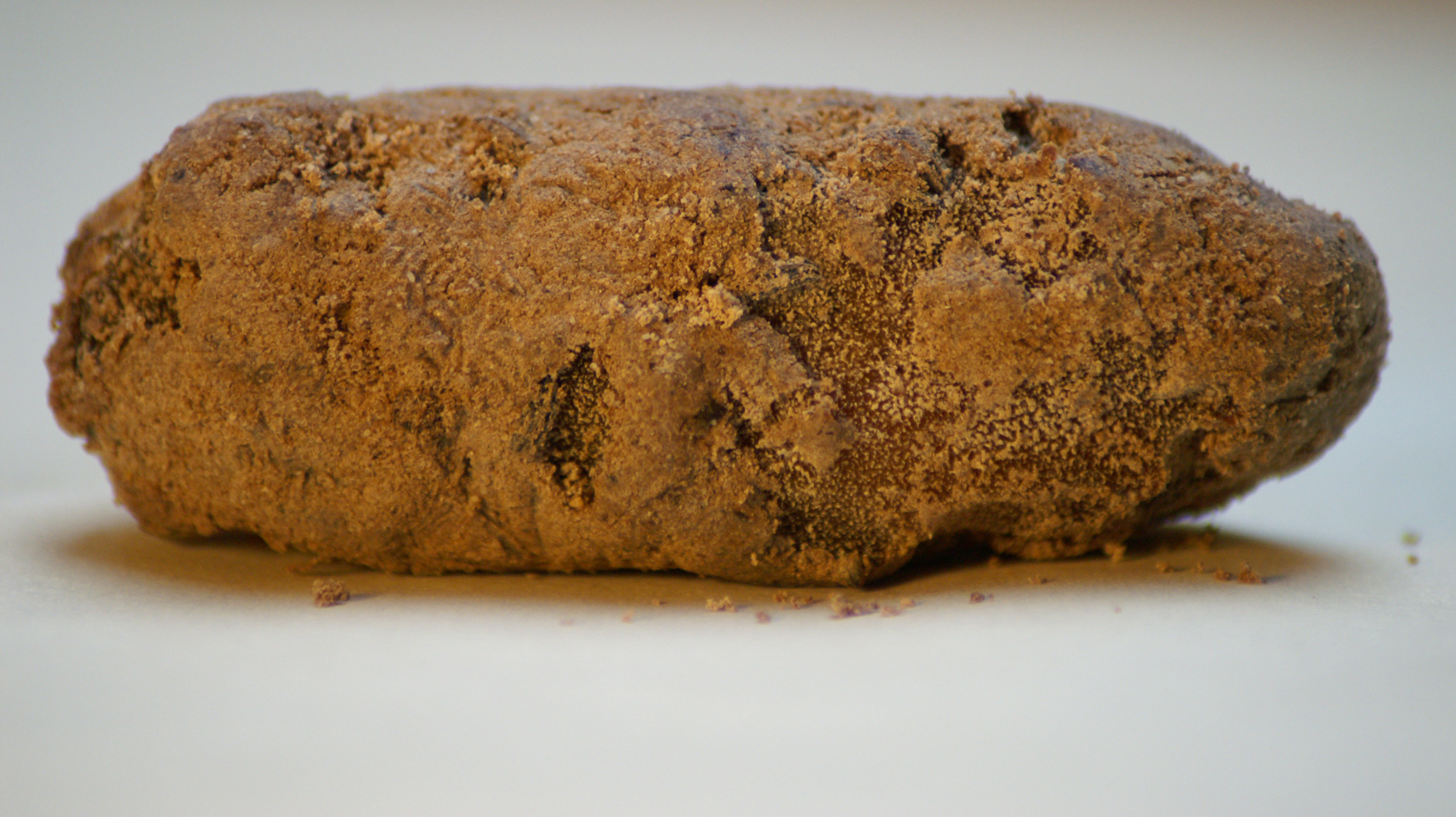
An aged Milbenkäse – cheese matured using cheese mites

== See also ==
- Cheese mite
- Cheese fly or cheese skipper, Piophila casei
