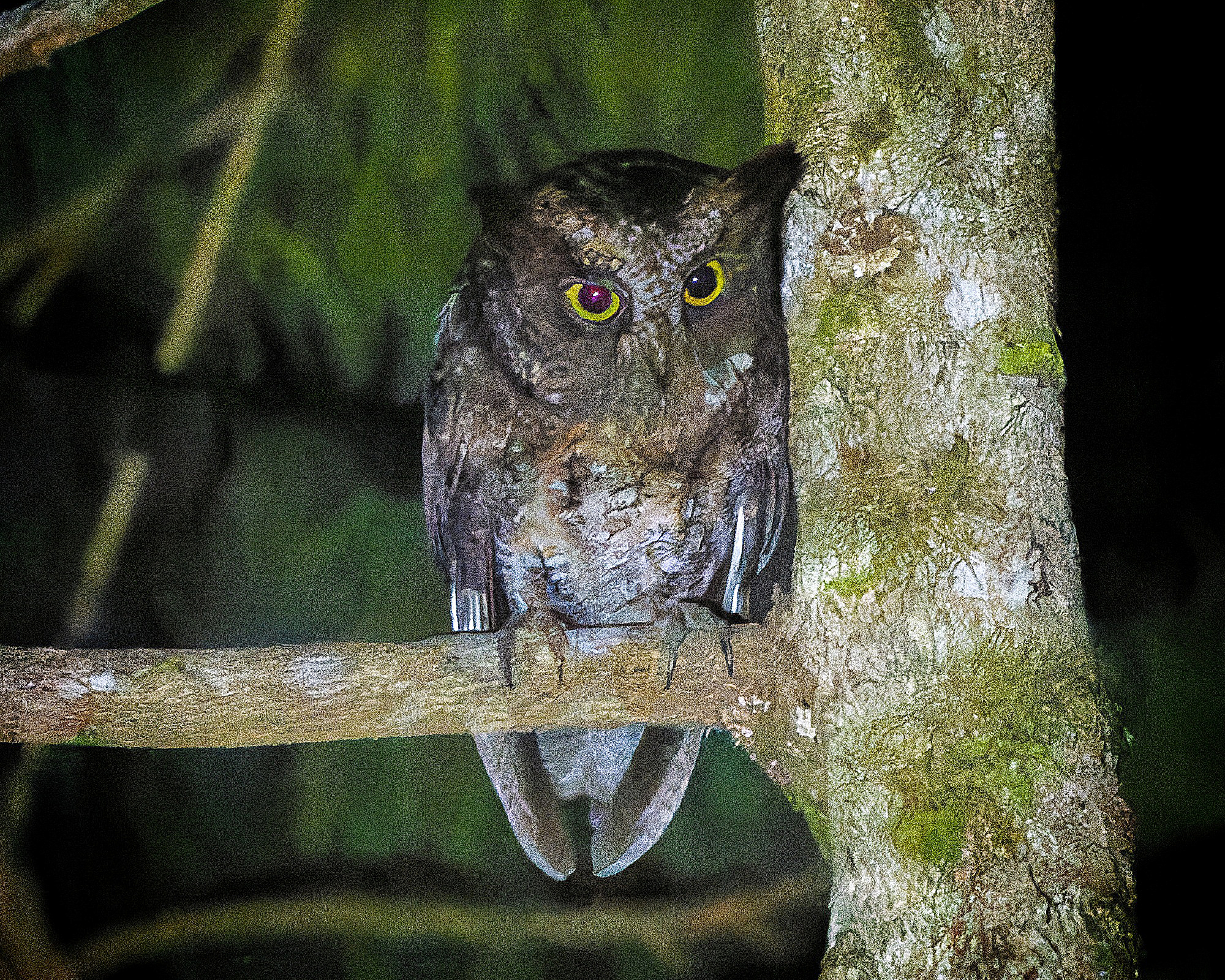

Conservation status
- Least Concern (IUCN 3.1)
- CITES Appendix II (CITES)

Scientific classification
- Kingdom: Animalia
- Phylum: Chordata
- Class: Aves
- Order: Strigiformes
- Family: Strigidae
- Genus: Otus
- Species: O. longicornis

Binomial name
- Otus longicornis (Ogilvie-Grant, 1894)

Synonyms
- Scops longicornis Ogilvie-Grant, 1894

= Luzon scops owl =

Species of owl

The Luzon scops owl (Otus longicornis) or the Luzon highland scops owl is a species of scops owl endemic to Luzon, Philippines. Not to be confused with the Philippine scops owl (Otus megalotis), sometimes referred to as the Luzon lowland scops owl, which is a more common species that shares the same range. The Luzon scops owl, however, is smaller and inhabits higher altitudes than its lowland relative.

== Description ==
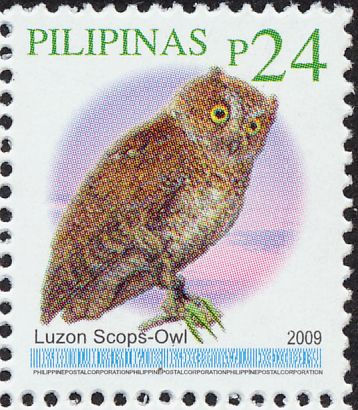
A 2009 Philippine Stamp featuring Luzon Scops Owl

The Luzon scops owl is relatively small even among species of scops owls endemic to the Philippines. It has a body length of 18 to 19 cm with a wing length of 13.6 to 15.3 cm. Their large eyes have bright yellow irises, and their beaks are small and slender. Their tarsi are feathered, but only until about halfway through its length and they are equipped with long, sharp claws, typical of birds of prey. Characteristic of scops owls, this species has long ear tufts and an overall dark brown and rufous plumage. Horizontal dark bars irregularly streak across most of its feathers. Areas along its breast, collar and facial disc are speckled white, giving its face the appearance of having white eyebrows. In contrast, the dark brown or rufous feathers on its throat, head and ear tufts are tipped black.

There is little information on this species' body mass, but a select few specimens weighed between 82 and 93 grams.

== Taxonomy ==
The Luzon scops owl is monotypic. Individuals of this species were previously thought to be part of Otus spilocephalus or O. scops, but proper classification by Joe T. Marshall in 1978 based on morphological features and vocalizations eventually earned it the species name Otus longicornis. It is closest genetically to the Mindanao scops owl (O. mirus) and the Mindoro scops owl (O. mindorensis) within the Otus genus, supported by their similar use of high altitude habitats. Besides their habitat preference, a genetic study also supports the evolutionary separation of the highland subgroup of Philippine-endemic scops owl species from those that prefer lowland habitats like the Philippine scops owl and its subspecies (O. megalotis, O. everetti, O. nigrorum) as well as the giant scops owl (O. gurneyi).

== Habitat and Distribution ==
The Luzon scops owl is known to be found in rainforest, montane forest, and tropical pine forest habitats at altitudes generally ranging anywhere from 350 to 1,800 m, but it may also be found at heights upwards of 2,200m.

Although its habitat range across Luzon appears to be relatively large, it is noted to be uncommon and has a patchy distribution that corresponds to its preferred, highland habitats. It has been recorded primarily in northern Luzon provinces such as Ilocos Norte, Benguet, Cagayan, Isabela, Nueva Ecija, or near Manila in Bulacan and Quezon. However, they may be found as far south as provinces like Camarines Norte and Camarines Sur.

== Behaviour ==
According to limited sightings, the Luzon scops owl appears to be a sedentary species, remaining in the same habitat year round. Like many owls, they have a nocturnal lifestyle.

=== Vocalizations ===
Recorded male vocalizations appear to be more frequent at night and consist of a single note that lowers in pitch, each whistle being separated by 3 to 5 seconds of silence. Their vocalization is said to resemble that of the Eurasian scops owl (Otus scops), however the single whistle type of vocalization is characteristic of many other scops owl species.

=== Diet ===
Little information is known about the species' diet. However, an inspection of the stomach contents of a few individuals revealed that they may be invertivores, primarily feeding on insects.

=== Reproduction ===
Information about reproduction is limited to a few sightings. Notably, chicks were observed to be born in May with light grey down feathers. The owls observed nested in a tree hole with a clutch size of 2 to 3 eggs per nest. Adult Luzon scops owls are thought to begin breeding at one year old with one clutch being produced per year.

== Conservation ==
The IUCN Red List previously assessed the Luzon scops owl to be a near threatened species but in 2023, this was revised to Least-concern species. This downlisting does not mean the populations have been increasing but reflects new data that found this species to be much more common than previously thought. There is no known information on population size and little known on population trends besides the high likelihood that it is decreasing. This species is still declining due to habitat loss. Activities that contribute to deforestation such as logging, mining and the growth of agricultural land in the region of Luzon pose a threat to its endemic species.

It is heavily suggested that critical habitats for the Luzon scops owl and other endangered or threatened birds be protected at all altitudes. Certain important areas Mount Pulag National Park are already protecting highland-dependant species and the Philippine government is working on creating more protected areas through the National Integrated Protected Area System (NIPAS).

This species is found in protected areas including Mount Pulag Protected Park and Mounts Banahaw–San Cristobal Protected Landscape but actual protection from habitat loss and hunting are lax.

Population surveys and frequent updates on the rates and effects of habitat loss within its range are strongly recommended to give a more accurate assessment of this species' conservation status.
