= Mindoro scops owl =

Conservation status
- Near Threatened (IUCN 3.1)
- CITES Appendix II

Scientific classification
- Kingdom: Animalia
- Phylum: Chordata
- Class: Aves
- Order: Strigiformes
- Family: Strigidae
- Genus: Otus
- Species: O. mindorensis

Binomial name
- Otus mindorensis (Whitehead, 1899)
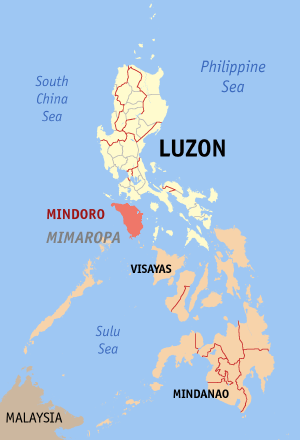

Species of owl

The Mindoro scops owl (Otus mindorensis) is an owl that is native to the Mindoro island in the Philippines. It is found in tropical moist montane forests above 870 masl. It is threatened by habitat loss. It is one of the three highland specialist scops owls which includes the Luzon scops owl and the Mindanao scops owl.

== Description and taxonomy ==
This species was once treated as a race of the Oriental scops owl and the Eurasian scops owl but greatly differs in morphology. It looks most similar to the Mantanani scops owl but greatly differs in habitat.

== Ecology and behavior ==
Its diet is not known but presumed to be the insects.

A specimen collected in the year 1896 reports that Mindoro scops owls have well-developed eggs. Other collected specimens have well-developed gonads in the months of January to May. Their eggs and nests are not described.

== Habitat and conservation status ==
They live in a terrestrial environment and their main habitat consists of the highly elevated forests with a very small global range, meaning they do not migrate or have movement patterns. The ongoing clearance of forest habitats has slightly affected their habitat.

The Mindoro scops owl is a near threatened species due to ongoing habitat destruction and is estimated to have 15,750–44,000 mature individuals with the population believed to be declining.
