= Mimolette =

French hard cheese

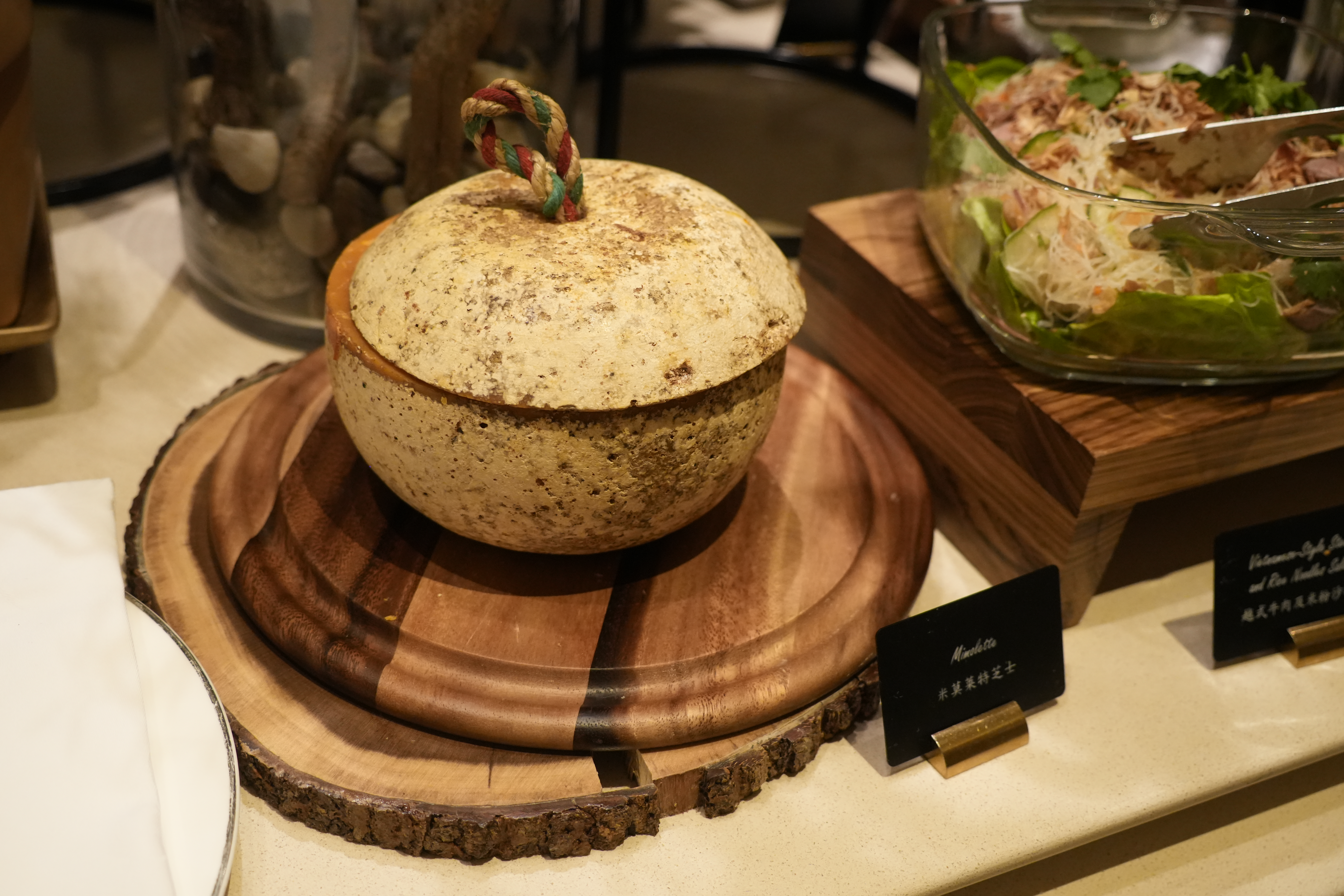
- Country of origin: France
- Town: Nord, Lille
- Source of milk: Cows
- Pasteurized: Yes
- Texture: Hard
- Aging time: 2 months – 2 years

Mimolette (French pronunciation: [mimɔlɛt]) is a cheese traditionally produced around the city of Lille, France. In France it is also known as boule de Lille after its city of origin, or vieux Hollande because it was originally inspired by the Dutch Edam cheese.

== Description ==
Mimolette has a spherical shape and is similar in appearance to a cantaloupe melon. It normally weighs about 2 kg (approximately 4.5 pounds) and is made from pasteurized cow's milk. Its name comes from the French word mi-mou (feminine mi-molle), meaning "semi-soft", which refers to the oily texture of this otherwise hard cheese. The bright orange color of the cheese comes from the natural seasoning annatto. When used in small amounts, primarily as a food colorant, annatto adds no discernible flavor or aroma. The grey-colored rind of aged Mimolette occurs from cheese mites that are added to the surface of the cheese, which serve to enhance its flavor.

Mimolette can be consumed at different stages of aging. When younger, its taste resembles that of Parmesan. Many appreciate it most when it is "extra-old" (extra-vieille). At that point, it can become rather hard to chew, and the flesh takes on a hazelnut-like flavor.

== History ==
It was originally made by the request of Louis XIV, who – in the context of Jean-Baptiste Colbert's mercantilistic policies – was looking for a native French product to replace the then very popular Edam. To make it distinct from Edam, it was first colored using carrot juice and later seasoned with annatto to give it a distinct orange color. It was then known as vieux Hollande or boule de Lille. The modern name only appeared in the 20th century, referring to the cheese's semi-soft, semi-hard texture when young.

Farmers from the original region gradually abandoned the production of this cheese, until it was revived elsewhere in France by three industrial cheesemakers: Lactalis in Bouvron, the Isigny-Sainte-Mère cooperative in Manche, and Savencia in Somme. The cheese is now pasteurized. In the 2010s, some artisanal farm production re-emerged.

The cheese was known to be a favorite of French President Charles de Gaulle.

== Health concerns in the U.S. ==
In 2013, the Food and Drug Administration detained about a ton of the cheese, putting further imports to the United States on hold. This was because the cheese mites could cause an allergic reaction if consumed in large quantities. The FDA stated that the cheese was above the standard of six mites per cubic inch. The restriction was lifted in 2014.

== In popular culture ==
Mimolette is the name of the mouse in the animated children's television series Gideon (by Michel Ocelot), broadcast in France in the mid-1970s.

== See also ==
- List of cheeses
- Milbenkäse
- Casu marzu
- Cuisine and specialties of Nord-Pas-de-Calais
