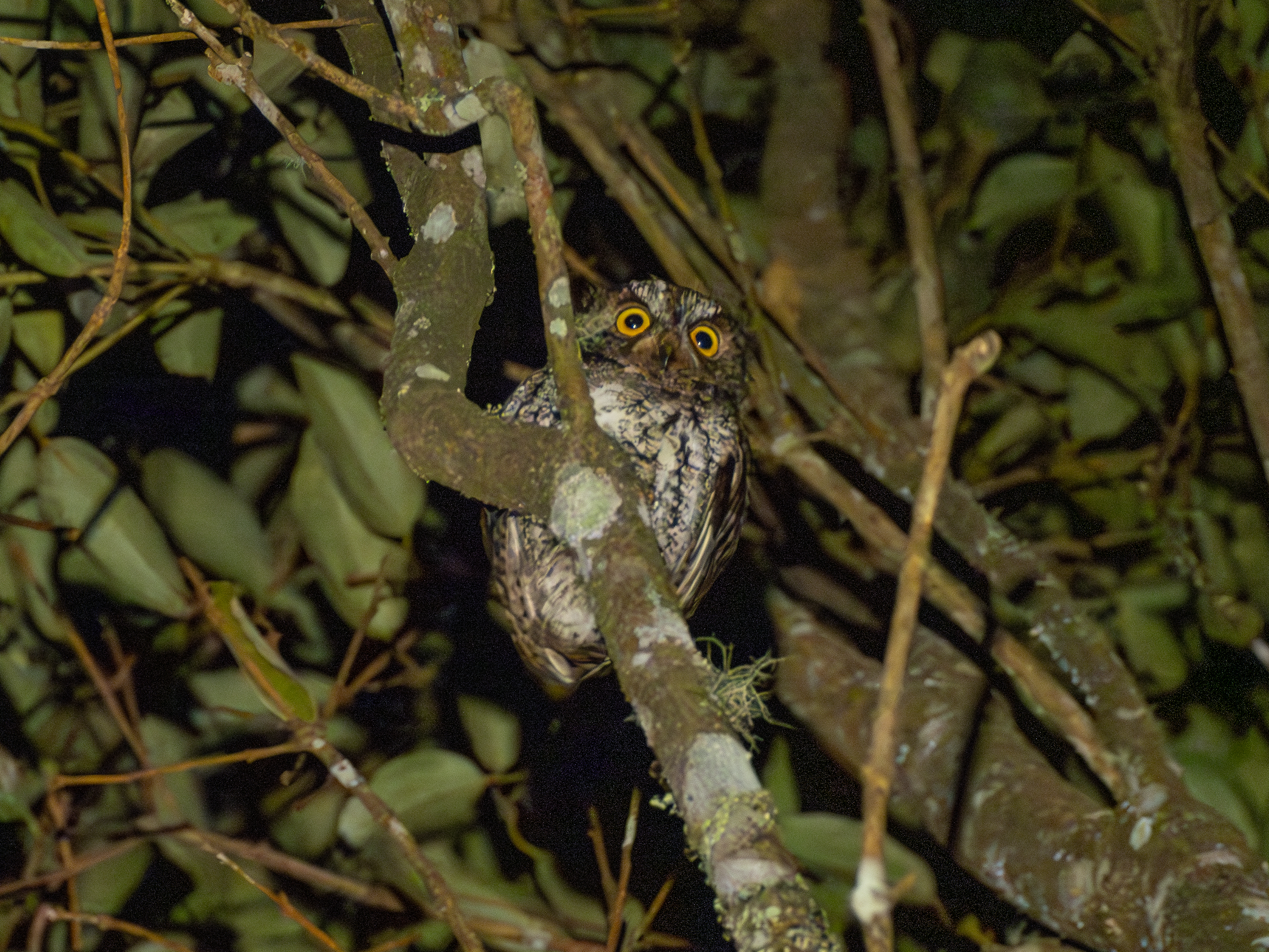

Conservation status
- Least Concern (IUCN 3.1)
- CITES Appendix II

Scientific classification
- Kingdom: Animalia
- Phylum: Chordata
- Class: Aves
- Order: Strigiformes
- Family: Strigidae
- Genus: Otus
- Species: O. mirus

Binomial name
- Otus mirus Ripley & Rabor, 1968

= Mindanao scops owl =

Species of owl

The Mindanao scops owl or Mindanao highland scops owl (Otus mirus) is an owl endemic to Mindanao island in the Philippines. It is found in tropical montane forest above 1,000 meters above sea level. It is threatened by habitat destruction and deforestation.

It is one of the three montane scops owl along with the Luzon scops owl and Mindoro scops owl.

== Description ==
Otus mirus is a small owl, with a mean length of 19 cm and body mass of approximately 65 g. It is characterized by heavily barred wings and back, a mottled white and brown front, and small white ear tufts. It shares parts of its range with Everett's scops owl, but is much smaller than this congener.

== Ecology and behaviour ==
Little is known about the diet of this species, but it likely consists primarily of insects, given the diets of other Otus species.

Breeding is presumed to occur around February to March as specimens with enlarged gonads were taken during this time.

== Habitat and conservation status ==
It occupies montane mossy forest above 1,000 meters (3,300 ft) above sea level.

IUCN has assessed this bird as least concern, but the population is believed to be decreasing. As it occurs in rugged and inaccessible mountains, this has allowed a large portion of its habitat to remain intact relative to lowland forests of the region, which are being rapidly deforested for agricultural use.
