= Tyrophagus longior =

Scientific classification
- Kingdom: Animalia
- Phylum: Arthropoda
- Subphylum: Chelicerata
- Class: Arachnida
- Order: Sarcoptiformes
- Family: Acaridae
- Genus: Tyrophagus
- Species: T. longior

Binomial name
- Tyrophagus longior (Gervais, 1844)

Synonyms
- Tyroglyphus dimidiatus Oudemans, 1924; Tyroglyphus infestans Berlese, 1884; Tyrophagus tenuiclavus Zakhvatkin, 1941

Species of acarid mite

Tyrophagus longior is a mite in the family Acaridae.

== Description ==
Tyrophagus longior is oval in shape and whitish to semitransparent in colour. It is covered dorsally in barbed setae. There are eight legs (six in larvae) that are light brown in colour.

Adult females of T. longior can be distinguished from others of the genus by the following: prodorsal shield without pigmented eyespots; hysterosomal setae d1 about 1.3–1.8× as long as c1 and d2, and the alveoli (bases) of d1 situated approximately midway between those of c1 and e1; and tarsi I and II with solenidia that are long and slender (not expanded at the tips). Adult males similarly lack pigmented eyespots and have long, slender solenidia. Males also have a large and slender aedeagus (male reproductive organ).

== Life cycle ==
Like other species of Tyrophagus, T. longior has a life cycle consisting of egg, larva, protonymph, tritonymph, and adult.

== Habitat ==
These mites have been collected from a wide range of plants and plant products, including seeds (e.g. acorns, peas), fruits (e.g. avocados, bananas, strawberries), grains (e.g. barley, wheat), vegetables (e.g. cucumbers, onions) and ornamental plants. They have also been collected from animal nests (e.g. bird nests, bee hives) and animal products (e.g. cheese, honey).

Despite this wide range of habitats, T. longior usually does not occur in human dwellings and when it does, rarely in large numbers. There is one report of a large T. longior population building up in dog biscuits underneath the floor (originally hoarded there by mice) and repeatedly emerging into a house by the thousands.

== Diet ==
Tyrophagus longior is predominantly a fungivore, but it can also feed on plants directly. Under laboratory conditions, T. longior has been reared on a mix of yeast and corn flour.

== Distribution ==
Tyrophagus longior occurs in many different countries and continents. It has even been introduced to Antarctica.

== Pest status ==
This species is one of the important mite pests on cheese. It is also one of the mites responsible for oral mite anaphylaxis, a disease caused by eating mite-contaminated food.

Ornamental plants such as Verbena, Malva (=Lavatera) and Consolida ajacis (=Delphinium ajacis) may suffer severe damage from T. longior attack. Symptoms include distortion and death of growing points and holing of young leaves.

== Research ==
The mitochondrial rDNA of T. longior has been sequenced and used in phylogenetic analysis.
