= Cheese mite =

Mite used in cheese production

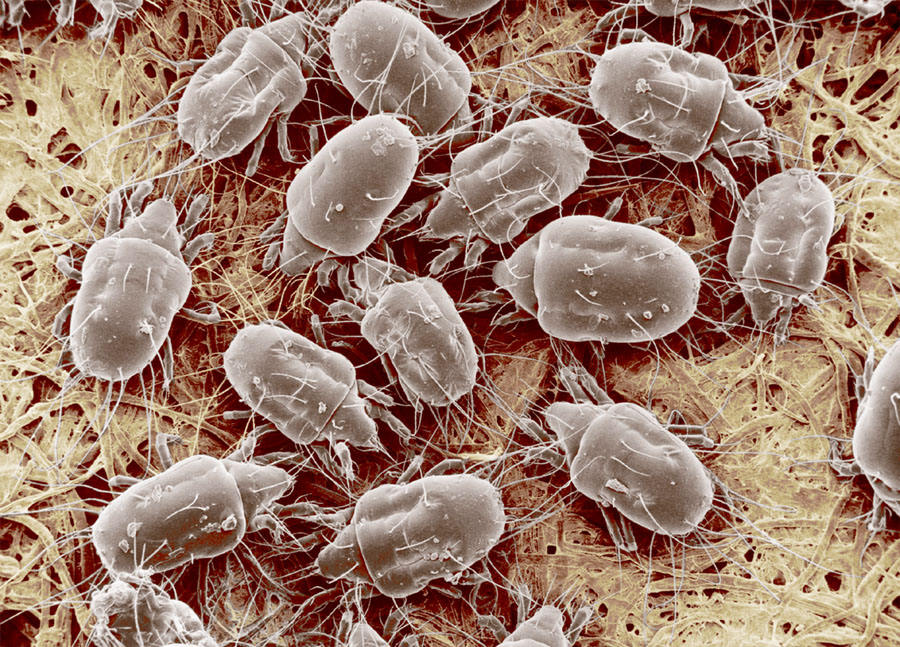
Tyrophagus putrescentiae is one of several mite species referred to as cheese mites (Ref Georgia Fife-Wright study of 2021). This species is common on plant leaves, stored grain and animal feed.

Cheese mites are mites (for instance Tyrophagus casei or other species) that are used to produce such cheeses as Milbenkäse, Cantal and Mimolette. The action of the living mites on the surface of these cheeses contributes to the flavor and gives them a distinctive appearance. A 2010 scanning electron microscope study found that Milbenkäse cheese was produced using Tyrophagus casei mites, while Mimolette cheese used Acarus siro mites (also known as flour mites). Mimolette cheese, in particular, has live cheese mites in its rind, which is thought to contribute to the cheese's distinct rind texture.

Some cheese mite species, such as Tyrophagus putrescentiae and Acarus siro, are mycophagous and the fungus species they digest are determined by the digestive enzymatic properties accordingly of each species.

== Gallery ==
A video of cheese mites (Acarus siro) forming the rind of a mimolette cheese.

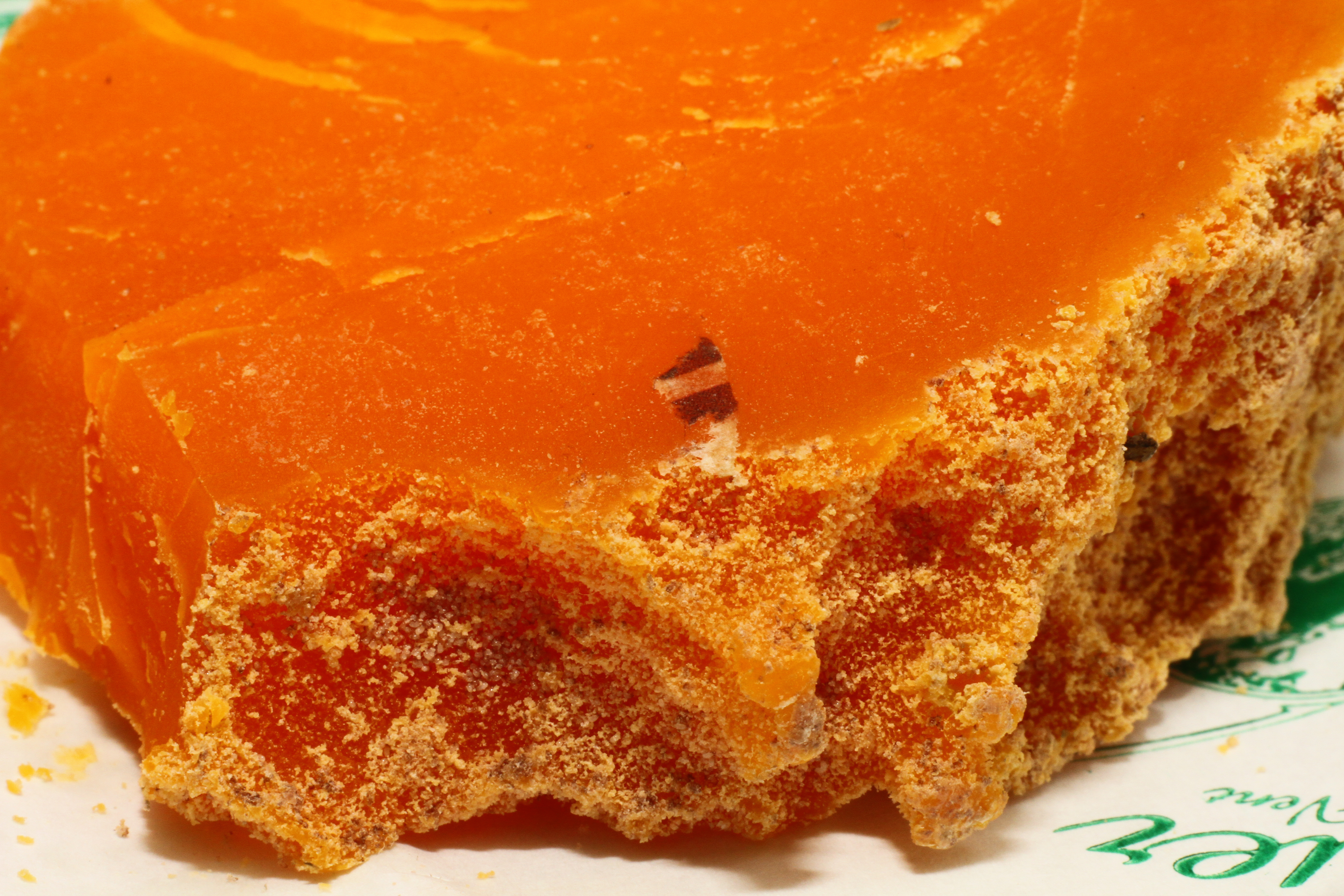
Mimolette cheese displaying the textured crust caused by the mites

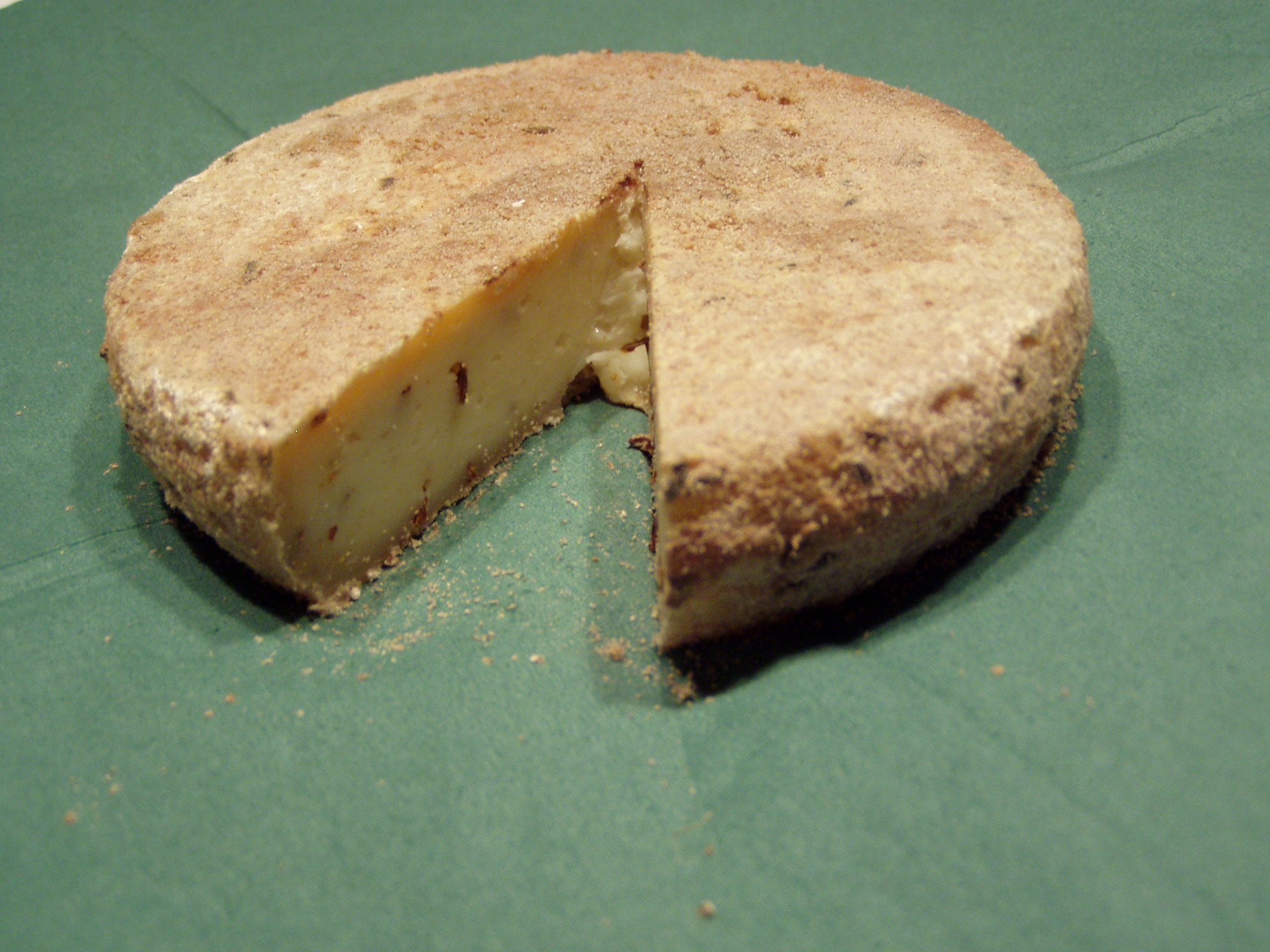
Milbenkäse, a German cheese with cheese mites

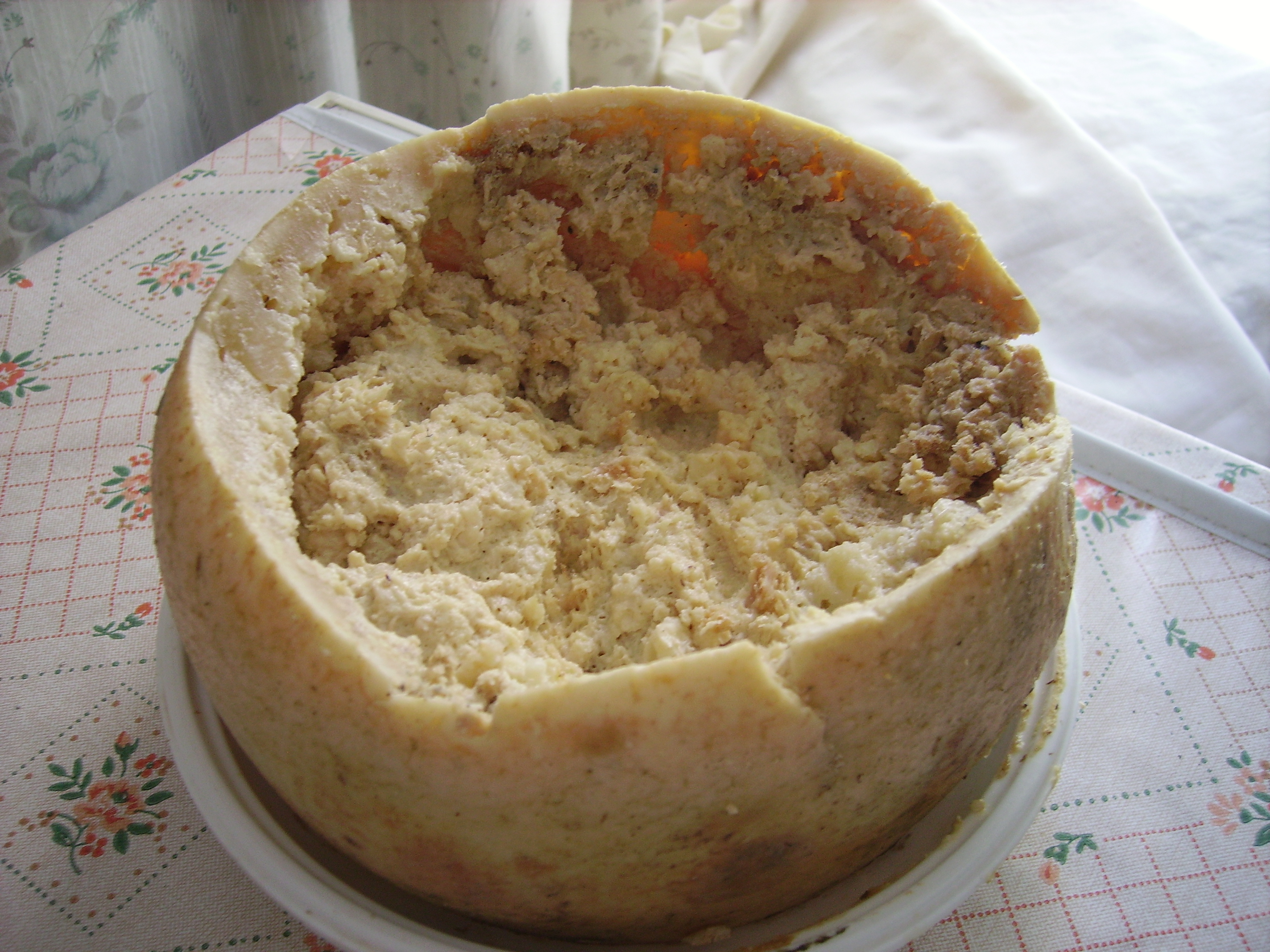
Casu martzu, a rotten cheese from Sardinia, Italy, is a traditional sheep milk cheese that contains live maggots as well as cheese mites.

== See also ==
- Cheese fly, Piophila casei
- The Cheese Mites, a 1903 documentary film
