= Milbenkäse =

German speciality cheese

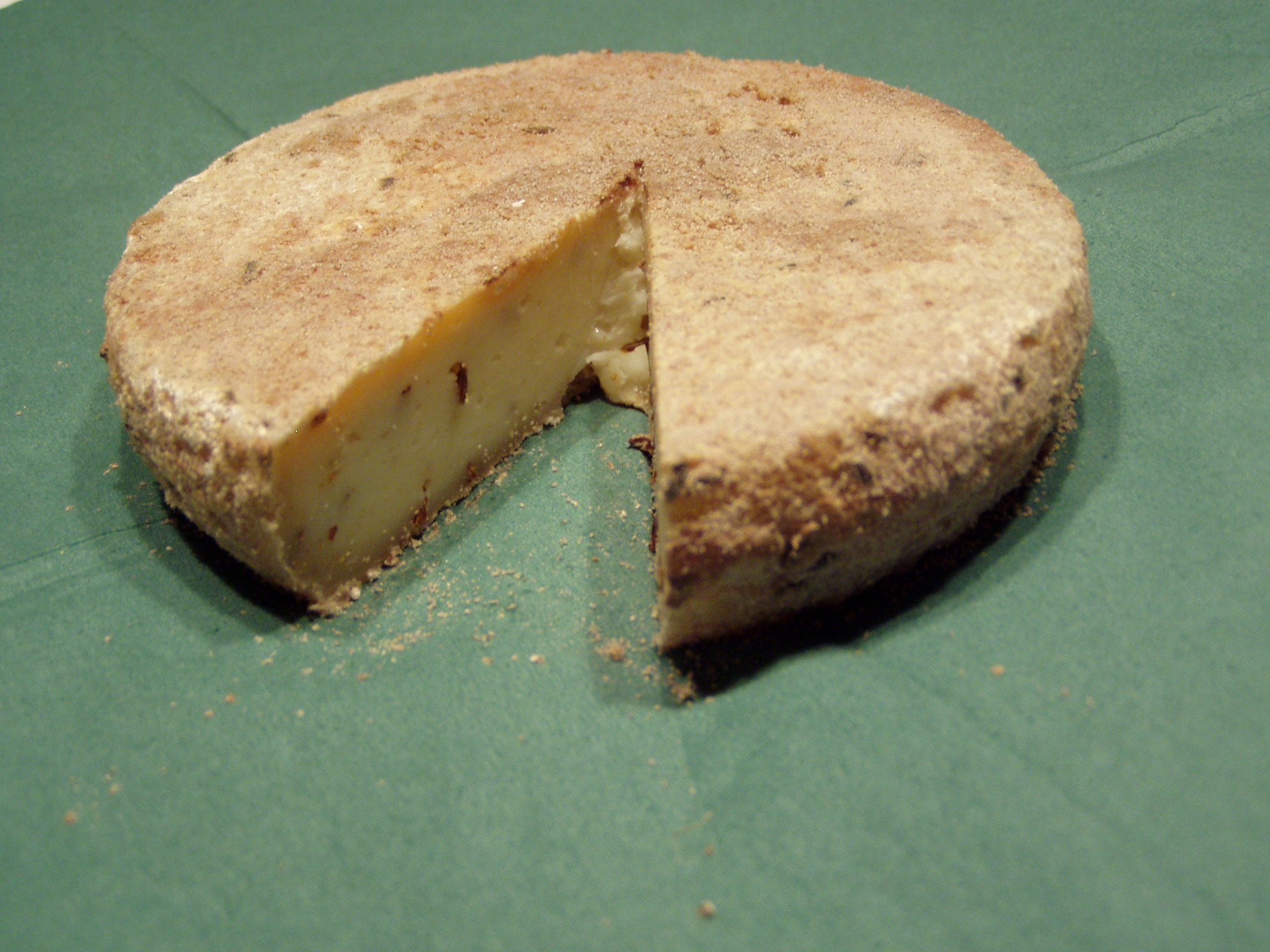
- Country of origin: Germany
- Region: Würchwitz, Saxony-Anhalt
- Source of milk: Cow
- Pasteurized: Yes
- Named after: Würchwitz

Milbenkäse ("mite cheese"), called Mellnkase in the local dialect and often known as Spinnenkäse ("spider cheese"), is a German speciality cheese. It is made by flavouring balls of quark (a type of soft cheese) with caraway and salt, allowing them to dry, and then leaving them in a wooden box containing rye flour and cheese mites for about three months. An enzyme in the digestive juices excreted by the mites causes the cheese to ripen. Milbenkäse tastes similar to Harzer cheese, but with a bitter note (increasing with age) and a zesty aftertaste. Mites clinging to the cheese rind are consumed along with the cheese.

Historically, the cheese was produced in the Zeitz and Altenburg districts of the Saxony-Anhalt / Thuringia border region; today it is produced exclusively in the village of Würchwitz, in the state of Saxony-Anhalt.

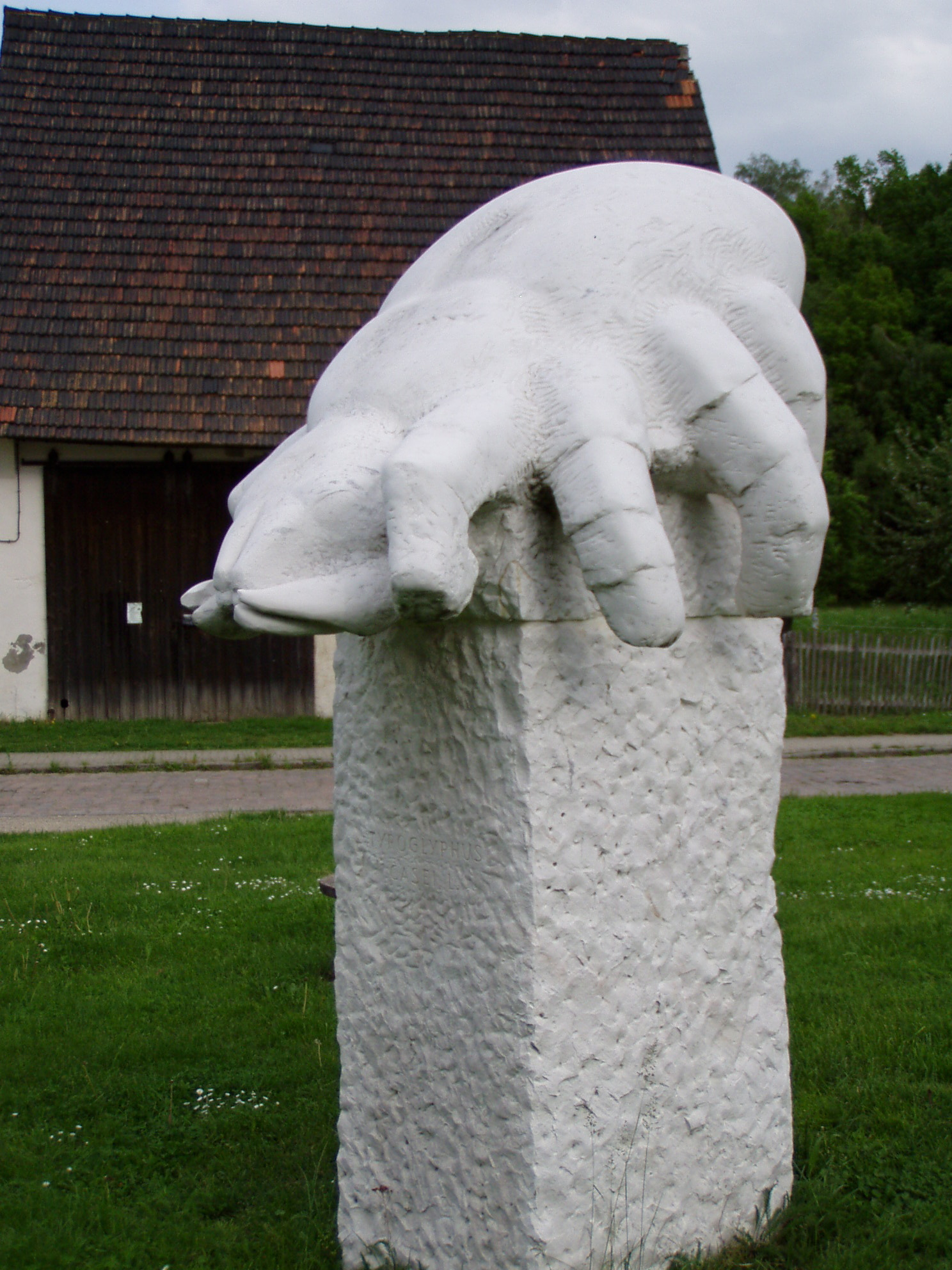
Cheese mite sculpture in Würchwitz

The traditional method of making Milbenkäse, which dates back to the Middle Ages, was nearly lost by 1970, with only the elderly Liesbeth Brauer knowing the technique. Local science teacher Helmut Pöschel was taught the proper way to make it and together with his associate, Christian Schmelzer, succeeded in revitalizing the tradition. A Cheese Mite Memorial was later erected at Würchwitz to celebrate the renaissance of Milbenkäse production.

== Production ==
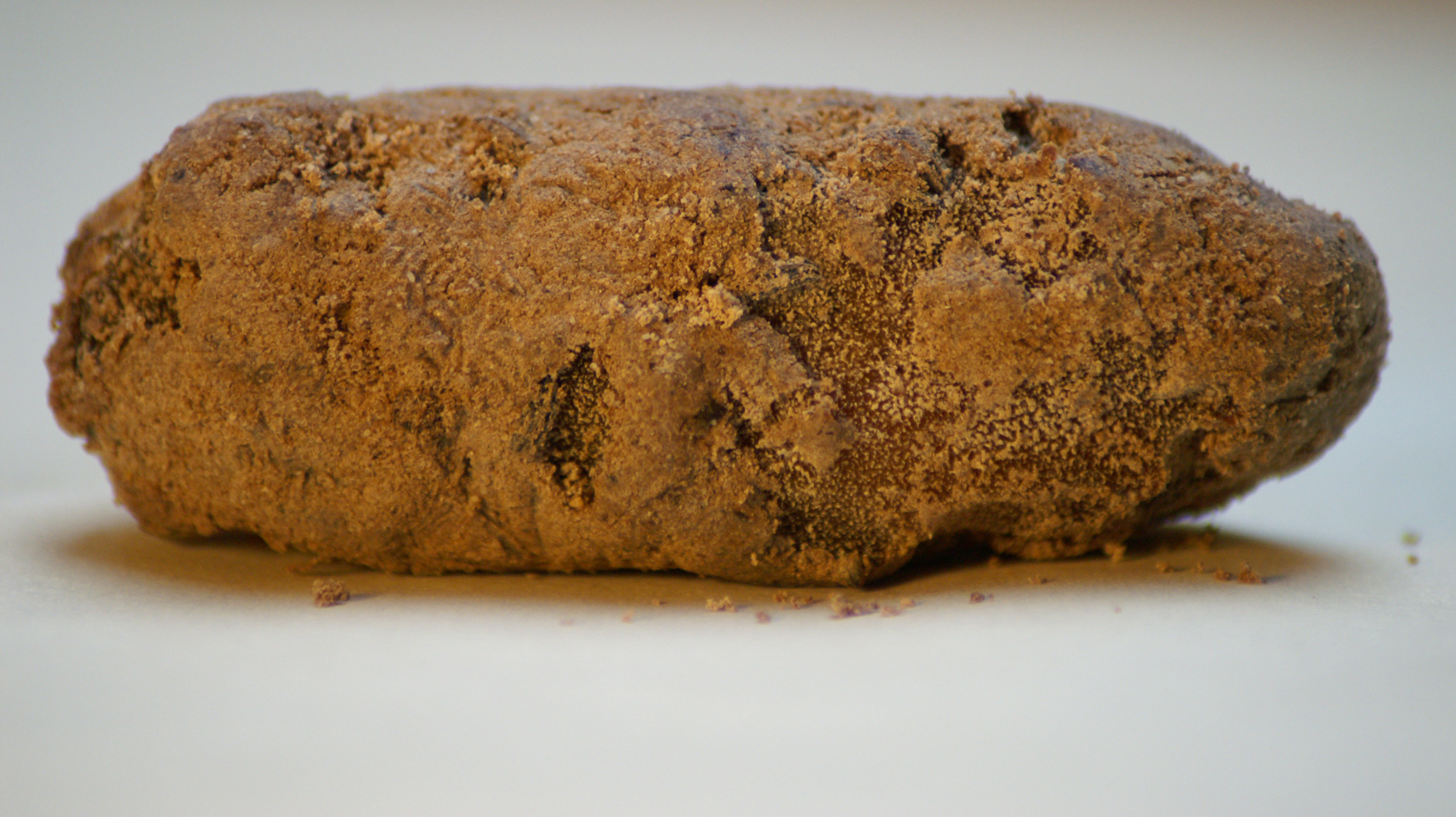
Aged Milbenkäse

Quark flavoured with salt and caraway is shaped into small balls, cylinders or wheels, and dried. It is then placed in a wooden box containing rye flour and inhabited by Tyrophagus casei mites for at least three months. The digestive juices of the mites diffuse into the cheese and cause fermentation; the flour is added because the mites would otherwise simply eat the whole cheese instead of just nibbling away at the crust as is desired. After one month, the cheese rind turns yellow; after three months, reddish brown. Some producers allow the cheese to ripen for up to one year, until it has turned black.

== Legality ==
Milbenkäse falls into a legal grey area: European Union regulations allow the sale of foodstuffs containing living animals if they are "prepared for placing on the market for human consumption". On the other hand, cheese mites or their digestive juices are not explicitly permitted as additives for cheese according to the relevant German food ordinances (Zusatzstoff-Zulassungsverordnung and Käseverordnung). Milbenkäse is produced under a permit by the local food safety office, and Hazard Analysis and Critical Control Points compliance of the product is enforced.

== See also ==
- German cuisine
- List of German cheeses
- List of cheeses
- Mimolette
- Casu martzu
