= Froriepia =

Froriepia is the scientific name of two genera of organisms and may refer to:

- Froriepia (mite), a genus of mites in the family Acaridae
- Froriepia (plant), a genus of plants in the family Apiaceae
