= Aleuroglyphus ovatus =

Scientific classification
- Kingdom: Animalia
- Phylum: Arthropoda
- Subphylum: Chelicerata
- Class: Arachnida
- Order: Sarcoptiformes
- Family: Acaridae
- Genus: Aleuroglyphus
- Species: A. ovatus

Binomial name
- Aleuroglyphus ovatus Troupeau, 1879

Species of mite

Aleuroglyphus ovatus, commonly known as brown-legged mite or brownlegged grain mite, is a species of mite in the family Acaridae. It is a cosmopolitan pest of grain.

== Description ==
Aleuroglyphus ovatus has a stout and pearly white body with red-brown legs (thus the common names) and chelicerae. It is sparsely covered in setae, of which the only long ones are located in a thin train at the posterior of the body. At the anterior end of the body are two pairs of setae, ve and vi, which are nearly level with each other. Posterior to these are the inner and outer proximal setae, with the inner pair being much shorter than the outer pair. The tarsi of females end in simple claws, like other acarids.

== Life cycle ==
At a temperature of 25 °C and a relative humidity of 75%, the entire life cycle of A. ovatus takes approximately 16 days and 10 hours on average. It consists of five stages: egg (80 hours), larva (77 hours), protonymph (115 hours), tritonymph (122 hours) and adult. There is also a quiescent period of approximately 24 hours between the larval, nymphal and adult stages.

Adults mate multiple times with each mating lasting 2–4 minutes. Females start laying eggs 1–3 days after the initial mating and continue for a period of 4–6 days. In her lifetime, a female will lay anywhere from 33 to 78 eggs.

As temperature increases, developmental time, longevity and oviposition period of A. ovatus decrease. Number of eggs laid per day, total eggs laid in a female's lifetime and population growth rate peak at 28 °C.

== Ecology ==
Aleuroglyphus ovatus infests a range of food products including wheat, bran, flour, dried fruit, dried vegetables, dried fish and chicken meal. It also occurs in dust of barns and grain storage facilities, hen houses and the burrows of rodents. It feeds on the fungi associated with such habitats.

This species is preyed on by the phytoseiid mite Neoseiulus barkeri.

== Physiology ==
This mite species has a low sensitivity to neryl formate and citral, chemicals which repel some other species of grain mites.
