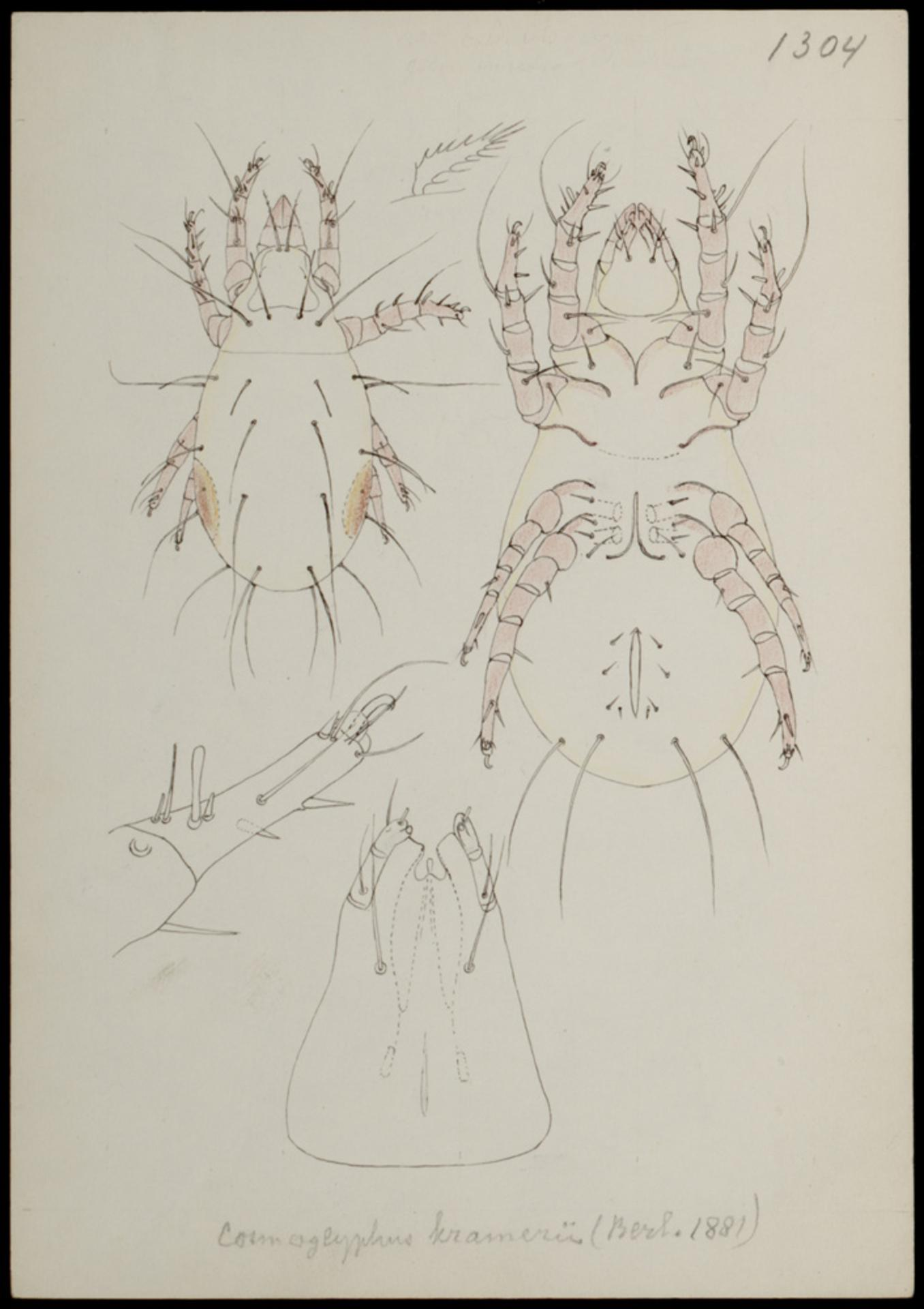
- Cosmoglyphus kramerii

Scientific classification
- Kingdom: Animalia
- Phylum: Arthropoda
- Subphylum: Chelicerata
- Class: Arachnida
- Order: Sarcoptiformes
- Family: Acaridae
- Genus: Cosmoglyphus; Oudemans, 1932

= Cosmoglyphus =

Genus of mites

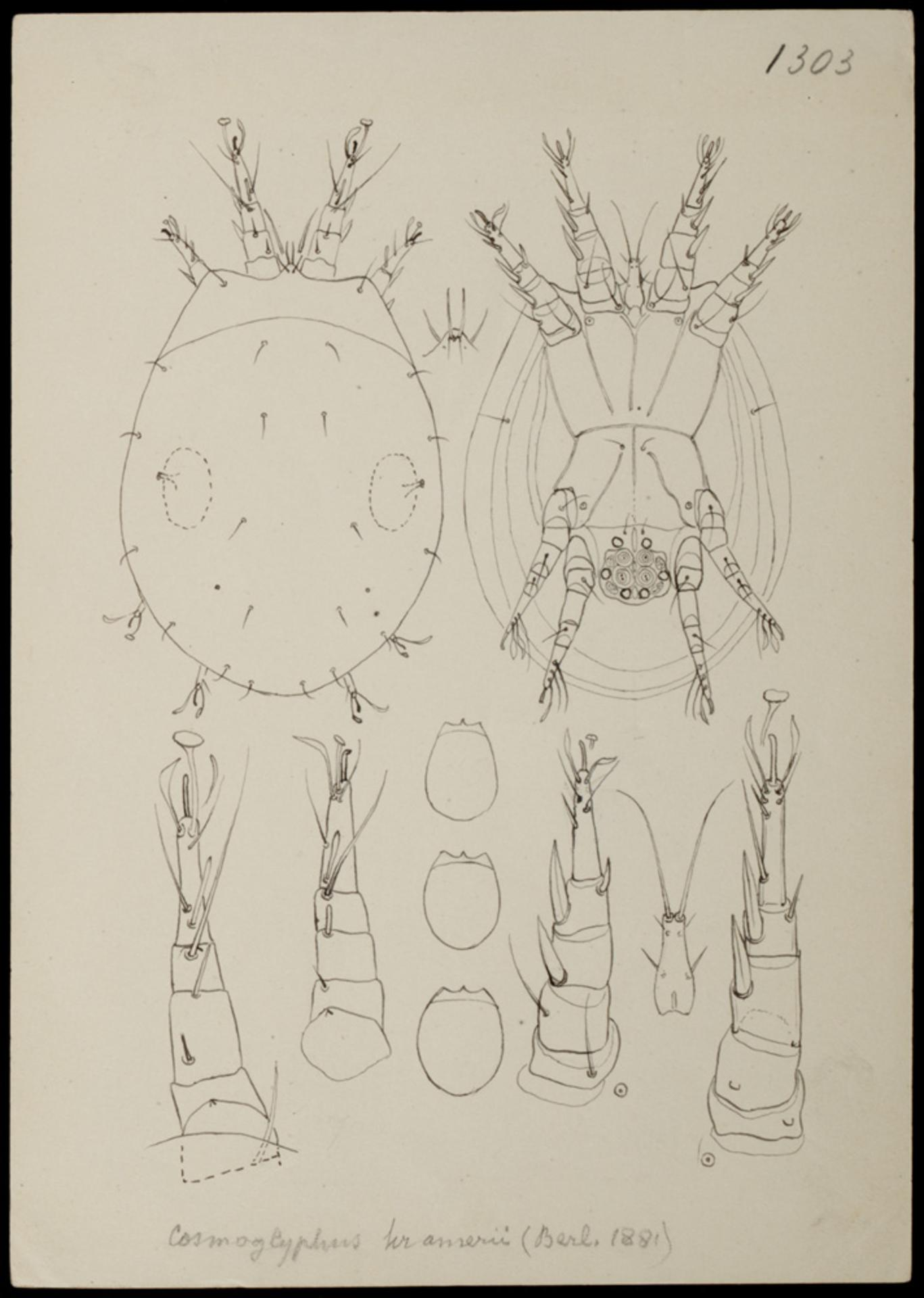
Deutonymph of Cosmoglyphus kramerii

Cosmoglyphus is a genus of mites in the family Acaridae.

== Description ==
Adults of this genus can be recognised by: supracoxal setae lanceolate and with lateral barbs; tarsi of the fourth leg pair short; males with proximal sucker on the proximal half of tarsus.

Deutonymphs (also known as hypopi) have the proximal ends of the sternum and epimerase II usually at the same transverse level near the posterior edge of the sternal shield. The genu of the fourth (sometimes third) leg pair is enlarged. The tibiae of the third and fourth leg pairs are approximately equal. The anal disk is small and the distance from it to the mite's posterior end is over 1.5 times its length. The ventrum is whole.

== Ecology ==
Cosmoglyphus are found in various habitats including dung, decaying plants and nests of ants and termites.

There is a case of Cosmoglyphus sp. living in a woman's ear (otoacariasis), where it was presumably feeding on fungi.

== Species ==
- Cosmoglyphus agilis (Michael, 1903)
- Cosmoglyphus angustus Fain & Friend, 1984
- Cosmoglyphus distantsis (Ashfaq & Chaudhri, 1986)
- Cosmoglyphus elzingai Mahunka, 1979
- Cosmoglyphus falki (Sher & Ashfaq, 1986)
- Cosmoglyphus haripuriensis (Ashfaq, Sher & Chaudhri, 1990)
- Cosmoglyphus hosoyai (Kugoh, 1957)
- Cosmoglyphus hyper (Ashfaq & Chaudhri, 1986)
- Cosmoglyphus infaustus (Ashfaq & Chaudhri, 1986)
- Cosmoglyphus kramerii (Berlese, 1881)
- Cosmoglyphus limbata (Mahunka, 1974)
- Cosmoglyphus longisetus Mahunka, 1979
- Cosmoglyphus memphiticus (Sevastianov & Rady, 1991)
- Cosmoglyphus mirabilis Fain, 1979
- Cosmoglyphus moshtohorensis (Sevastianov & Rady, 1991)
- Cosmoglyphus oudemansi Zakhvatkin, 1937
- Cosmoglyphus pytho (Ashfaq & Chaudhri, 1986)
- Cosmoglyphus ruditas (Ashfaq & Chaudhri, 1986)
- Cosmoglyphus sicafer Mahunka, 1978
- Cosmoglyphus stremma (Ashfaq & Chaudhri, 1986)
- Cosmoglyphus tariqii (Ashfaq, Sher & Chaudhri, 1990)
- Cosmoglyphus thosmos (Ashfaq & Chaudhri, 1986)
