= Histiogaster =

Scientific classification
- Kingdom: Animalia
- Phylum: Arthropoda
- Subphylum: Chelicerata
- Class: Arachnida
- Order: Sarcoptiformes
- Family: Acaridae
- Genus: Histiogaster; Berlese, 1883

Genus of mites

Histiogaster is a genus of mites in the family Acaridae.

== Species ==
- Histiogaster bacchus Zachvatkin, 1941
- Histiogaster carpio (Kramer, 1882)
- Histiogaster ocellata Vitzthum, 1926
- Histiogaster silenus Zachvatkin, 1941
