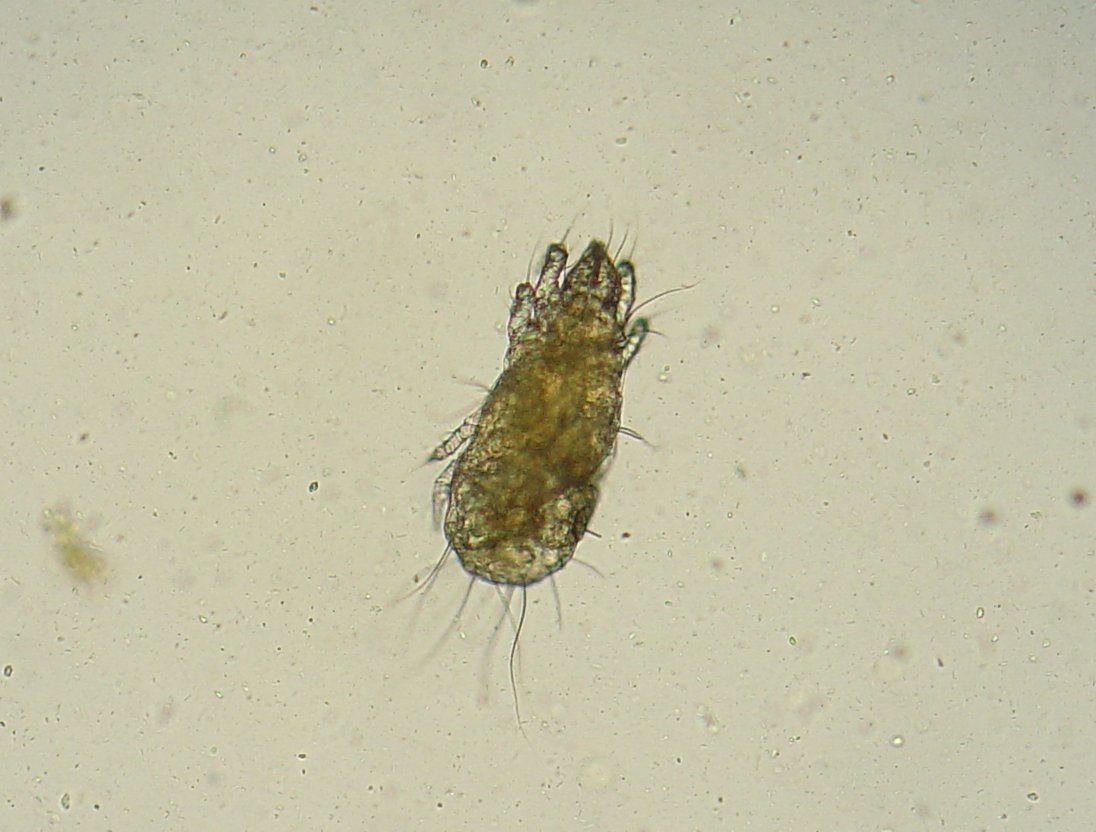
- Acarus siro

Scientific classification
- Kingdom: Animalia
- Phylum: Arthropoda
- Subphylum: Chelicerata
- Class: Arachnida
- Order: Sarcoptiformes
- (unranked): Astigmatina
- Suborder: Acaridia
- Superfamily: Acaroidea
- Family: Acaridae; Latreille, 1802

Subfamilies
- Acarinae; Fagacarinae; Pontoppidaniinae; Rhizoglyphinae

Diversity
- > 110 genera, > 400 species

= Acaridae =

Family of mites

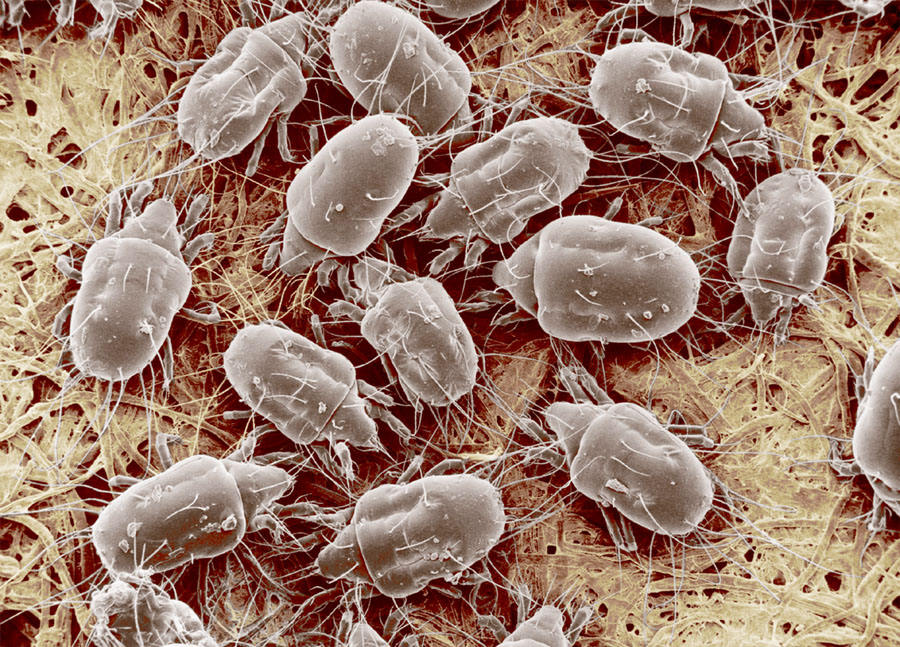
Tyrophagus putrescentiae

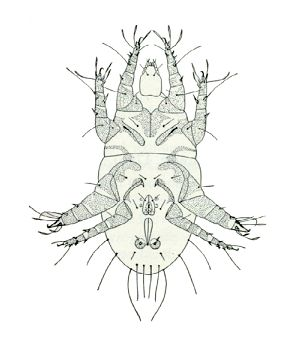
Rhizoglyphus echinopus

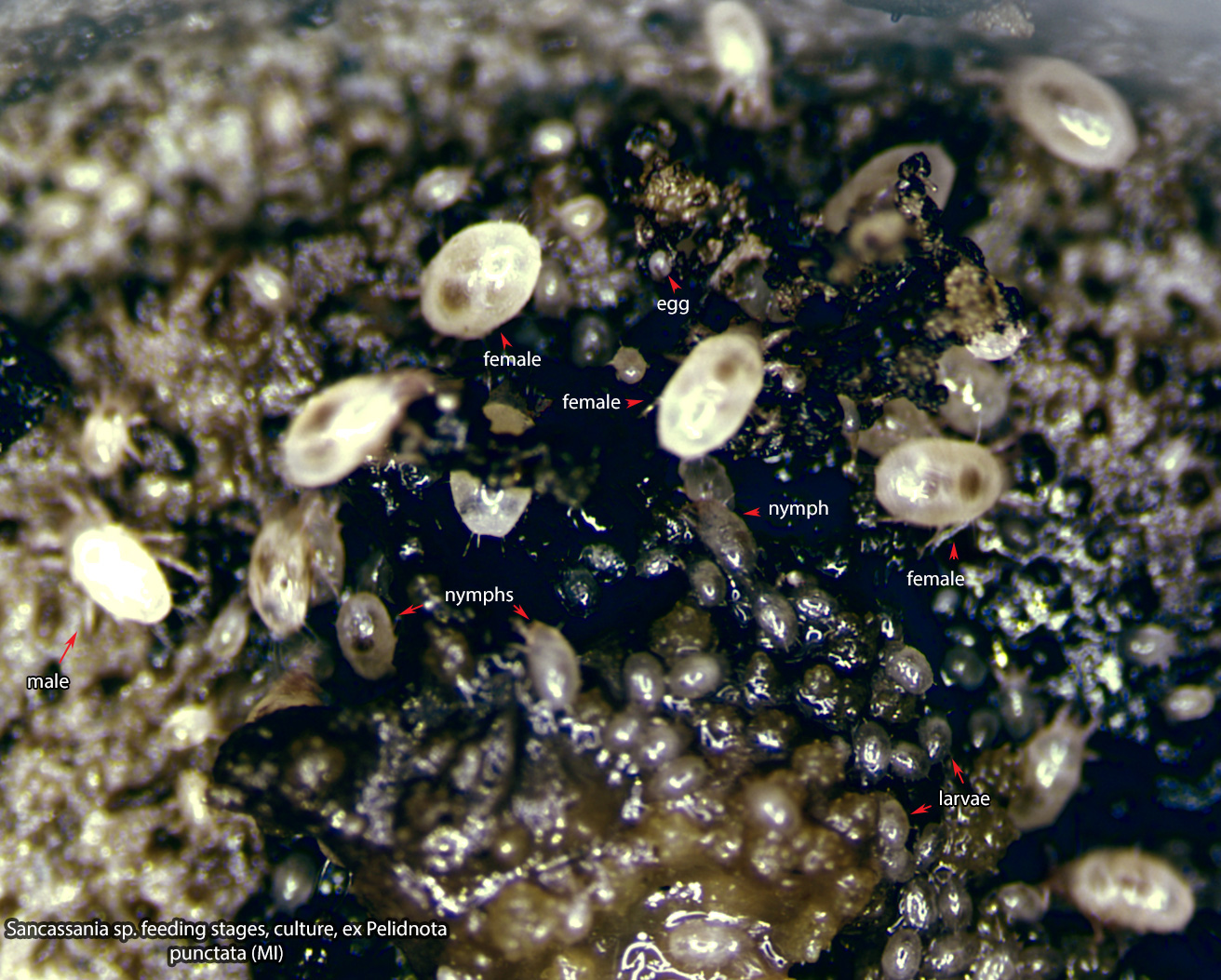
Sancassania sp.

The Acaridae are a family of mites in order Sarcoptiformes.

== Distribution ==
There are several acarid genera with cosmopolitan distributions, such as Acarus, Sancassania and Tyrophagus.

== Ecology ==
Acaridae live in various habitats and have various diets.

Many are generalists that live in natural (e.g. soil, litter, animal nests, decomposing plant material) and artificial (e.g. human dwellings, granaries, greenhouses, plant nurseries) environments. They feed on decomposing organic material, fungi and nematodes.

There are also more specialised acarids. Some Acarus inhabit nests of warm-blooded animals, mostly rodents and birds. Within Sancassania, there are species associated with certain bees, associated with scarabaeid beetles (riding phoretically on live beetles and feeding on dead beetles) or feeding on mushrooms. A lineage of Tyrophagus, comprising T. formicetorum and related species, only occurs in ant nests. A number of Histiogaster species live beneath bark (subcortical) and feed on fungi.

== Dispersal ==
Various Acaridae have a phoretic deutonymph stage in their life cycle, a non-feeding nymph stage that can disperse to new habitats by riding on larger animals. Hyperphoresy (riding an animal which is itself riding a third animal) has also been reported, with acarid deutonymphs on a larger Uropodidae mite which in turn was on a beetle.

Most Tyrophagus species do not form deutonymphs (except for the T. formicetorum lineage), instead dispersing as feeding life stages. They may disperse phoretically, by active movements or by air currents.

== Pests ==
Some Acaridae species are stored product pests, such as Acarus siro, A. farris, Tyrophagus putrescentiae, Tyrophagus longior and Tyrolichus casei. These infest stored organic materials such as grains, flour, dried fruit, milk products, hams, cheeses, straw, animal hides, invertebrate culture media, vertebrate bedding materials and animal feed. They thrive in humid conditions and on damp materials. Acaridae can cause dermatitis via piercing human skin (in attempts to feed) or via contact allergens.

There are also Acaridae which are pests of living plants. These include the genus Rhizoglyphus (pests of plants with bulbs) and the species T. longior (pest of some ornamental plants).

== Genera ==
Fagacarinae Fain & R. A. Norton, 1979

- Fagacarus Fain & R. A. Norton, 1979

Acarinae Nesbitt, 1945

- Acarus Linnaeus, 1758
- Aleuroglyphus Zachvatkin, 1940
- Ebertia Oudemans, 1924
- Podoglyphus Oudemans, 1937
- Tyrolichus Oudemans, 1924
- Tyroglyphites Pampaloni, 1902
- Tyrophagus Oudemans, 1924

Rhizoglyphinae Zakhvatkin, 1941

- Acarotalpa Volgin, 1966
- Acotyledon Oudemans, 1903
- Caloglyphus Berlese, 1923
- Cosmoglyphus Oudemans, 1932
- Froriepia Vitzthum, 1919
- Garsaultia Oudemans, 1916
- Histiogaster Berlese, 1883
- Horstia Oudemans, 1905
- Mycetoglyphus Oudemans, 1932
- Myrmoglyphus Vitzthum, 1935
- Rhizoglyphus Claparédè, 1869
- Sancassania Oudemans, 1916
- Schwiebea Oudemans, 1916
- Stereoglyphus Berlese, 1923
- Thyreophagus Rondani, 1874
- Troglocoptes Fain, 1966
- Valmontia Oudemans, 1923
- Viedebanttia Oudemans, 1929

Pontoppidaniinae Oudemans, 1925

- Diphtheroglyphus Nesbitt, 1950
- Pontoppidania Oudemans, 1923

Incertae sedis

- Aellenella S. Mahunka, 1978
- Apiacarus Volgin, 1974
- Amphicalvolia Türk, 1963
- Armacarus S. Mahunka, 1979
- Askinasia Yunker, 1970
- Australhypopus Fain & Friend, 1984
- Baloghella Mahunka, 1963
- Bembidioglyphus Klimov, 1998
- Boletacarus V. I. Volgin & S. V. Mironov, 1980
- Boletoglyphus Volgin, 1953
- Bromeliaglyphus H. H. J. Nesbitt, 1985
- Calvoliella Samsinak, 1969
- Calvoliopsis Mahunka, 1973
- Capillaroglyphus Klimov, 1998
- Carabidobius Volgin, 1953
- Cerophagopsis Zachvatkin, 1941
- Chibidaria Sasa, 1952
- Contromelisia Samsinak, 1969
- Ctenocolletacarus Fain, 1984
- Diadasiopus OConnor, 1997
- Dynastopus Fain, 1978
- Ewingia Pearse, 1929
- Fainoglyphus S. Mahunka, 1979
- Forcellinia Oudemans, 1924
- Ghanacarus Mahunka, 1973
- Halictacarus Mahunka, 1975
- Heteroglyphus Foa, 1897
- Hoogstraalacarus Yunker, 1970
- Horstiella Türk, 1949
- Hortacarus S. Mahunka, 1979
- Hyohondania Sasa, 1952
- Irianopus Fain, 1986
- Kanekobia Fain, C. E. Yunker, J. van Goethem & D. E. Johnston, 1982
- Kargoecius Fain, 1985
- Konoglyphus Delfinado & Baker, 1974
- Kuzinia Zachvatkin, 1941
- Lackerbaueria Zachvatkin, 1941
- Lamtoglyphus Fain, 1975
- Lasioacarus Kadzhyaya, 1968
- Lemmaniella Mahunka, 1977
- Lindquistia Mahunka, 1977
- Lowryacarus Fain, 1986
- Machadoglyphus Mahunka, 1963
- Madaglyphus Fain, 1971
- Mahunkaglyphus Eraky, 1998
- Mahunkallinia Eraky, 1999
- Mauracarus S. Mahunka, 1978
- Medeus Volgin, 1974
- Megachilopus Fain, 1974
- Mezorhizoglyphus Kadzhaya, 1966
- Mycetosancassania Klimov, 2000
- Myrmolichus Türk & Türk, 1957
- Naiacus H. H. J. Nesbitt, 1990
- Naiadacarus Fashing, 1974
- Neoacotyledon K. Samsinak, 1980
- Neohorstia Zachvatkin, 1941
- Neotropacarus Baker, 1985
- Notiopsyllopus Fain, 1977
- Ocellacarus S. Mahunka, 1979
- Olafsenia Oudemans, 1927
- Omentopus Fain, 1978
- Paraceroglyphus Fain & Beaucournu, 1979
- Paraforcellinia Kadzhaya, 1974
- Passaloglyphus Mahunka & Samsinak, 1972
- Paulacarellus Fain, 1976
- Pelzneria Scheucher, in Stammer 1957
- Pinoglyphus S. Mahunka, 1978
- Psyllacarus Fain, F. Bartholomaeus, B. Cooke & J. C. Beaucournu, 1990
- Psylloglyphus Fain, 1966
- Psyllopus Fain & J. C. Beaucournu, 1993
- Reckiacarus G. Kadzhaya, 1972
- Rettacarus S. Mahunka, 1979
- Rhizoglyphoides V. I. Volgin, 1978
- Rodionovia Zachvatkin, 1941
- Scatoglyphus Berlese, 1913
- Schulzea Zachvatkin, 1941
- Sennertionyx Zachvatkin, 1941
- Setoglyphus S. Mahunka, 1979
- Sinolardoglyphus Z. T. Jiang, 1991
- Sinosuidasia Jiang, 1996
- Spinacaropus Fain & A. M. Camerik, 1978
- Terglyphus Samsinak, 1965
- Thectochloracarus Fain, Engel, Flechtmann & OConnor, 1999
- Trichopsyllopus Fain & G. T. Baker, 1983
- Troxocoptes Fain & J. R. Philips, 1983
- Umakefeq Klimov, 2000
- Volginia Kadzhaya, 1967
