= Forcellinia =

Scientific classification
- Kingdom: Animalia
- Phylum: Arthropoda
- Subphylum: Chelicerata
- Class: Arachnida
- Order: Sarcoptiformes
- Family: Acaridae
- Genus: Forcellinia; Oudemans, 1924

Genus of mites

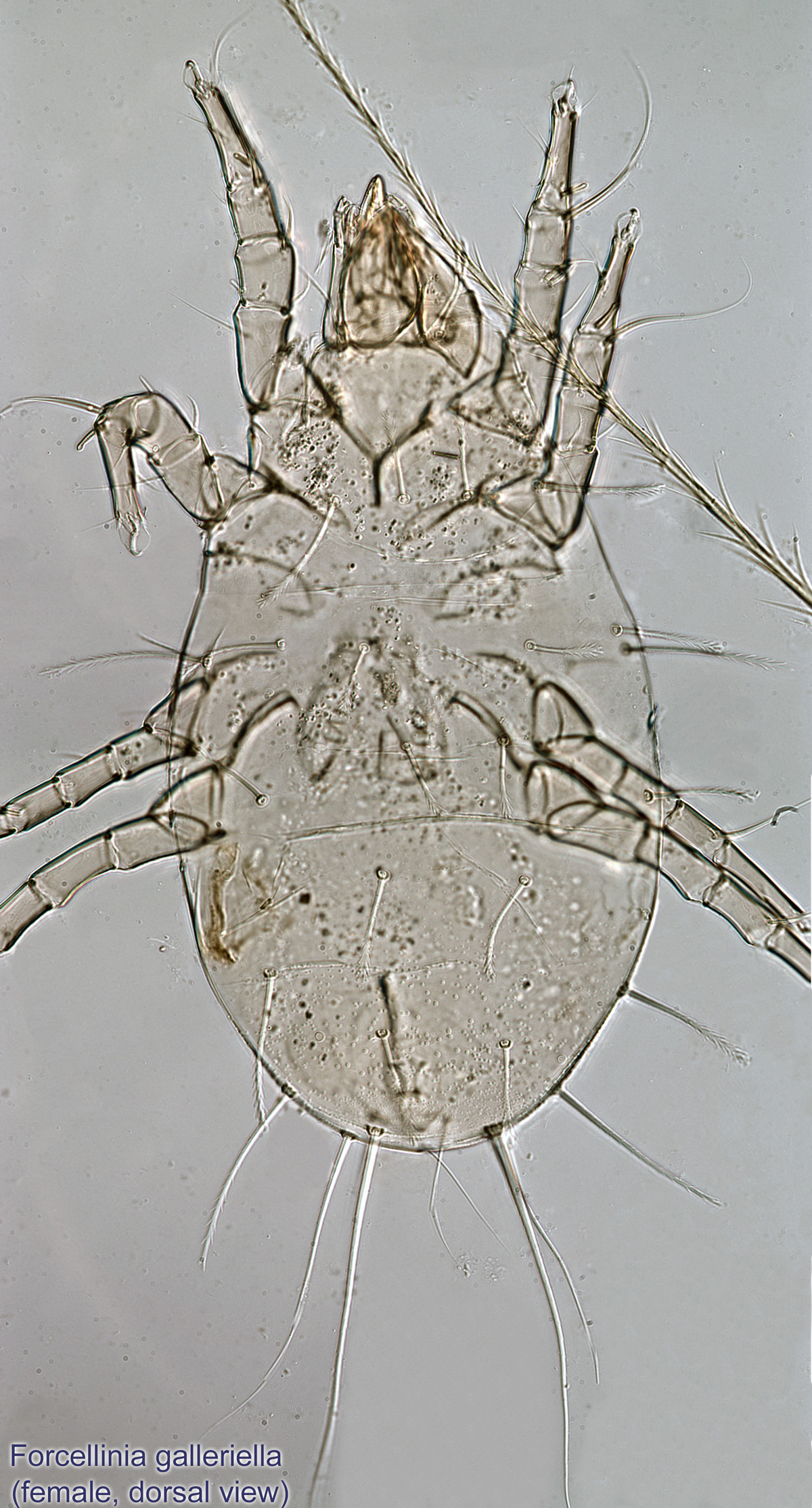
Forcellinia gallerialla

Forcellinia is a genus of mites in the family Acaridae.

== Species ==
- Forcellinia bipunctata Mahunka, 1978
- Forcellinia cortina Ashfaq & Chaudhri, 1984
- Forcellinia diamesa Zakhvatkin
- Forcellinia egyptiaca Eraky, 1998
- Forcellinia faini Delfinado, Baker & Baker, 1989
- Forcellinia galleriella Womersley, 1963
- Forcellinia hauseri Mahunka, 1978
- Forcellinia kasachstanica Umbetalina, 1975
- Forcellinia laesionis Mahunka, 1979
- Forcellinia mystax (Mahunka, 1977)
- Forcellinia rugosus (S. Mahunka, 1979)
- Forcellinia samsinaki (Mahunka, 1962)
- Forcellinia tumulus Sarwar, 2001
- Forcellinia wasmanni (Moniez, 1892)
