= Pontoppidania =

Scientific classification
- Kingdom: Animalia
- Phylum: Arthropoda
- Subphylum: Chelicerata
- Class: Arachnida
- Order: Sarcoptiformes
- Family: Acaridae
- Genus: Pontoppidania; Oudemans, 1923

Genus of mites

Pontoppidania is a genus of mites in the family Acaridae.

== Species ==
- Pontoppidania littoralis (Halbert, 1920)
