= Neoacotyledon =

Scientific classification
- Kingdom: Animalia
- Phylum: Arthropoda
- Subphylum: Chelicerata
- Class: Arachnida
- Order: Sarcoptiformes
- Family: Acaridae
- Genus: Neoacotyledon; K. Samsinak, 1980

Genus of mites

Neoacotyledon is a genus of mites in the family Acaridae.

== Species ==
- Neoacotyledon rhizoglyphoides (Zachvatkin, 1937)
- Neoacotyledon sokolovi (Zachvatkin, 1940)
