= Neohorstia =

Scientific classification
- Kingdom: Animalia
- Phylum: Arthropoda
- Subphylum: Chelicerata
- Class: Arachnida
- Order: Sarcoptiformes
- Family: Acaridae
- Genus: Neohorstia; Zachvatkin, 1941

Genus of mites

Neohorstia is a genus of mites in the family Acaridae.

== Species ==
- Neohorstia mamillata Zachvatkin, 1941
