= Mycetoglyphus =

Scientific classification
- Kingdom: Animalia
- Phylum: Arthropoda
- Subphylum: Chelicerata
- Class: Arachnida
- Order: Sarcoptiformes
- Family: Acaridae
- Genus: Mycetoglyphus; Oudemans, 1932

Genus of mites

Mycetoglyphus is a genus of mites in the family Acaridae.

== Species ==
- Mycetoglyphus fungivorus Oudemans, 1932
- Mycetoglyphus sevastianovi Kadzhaja, 1988
