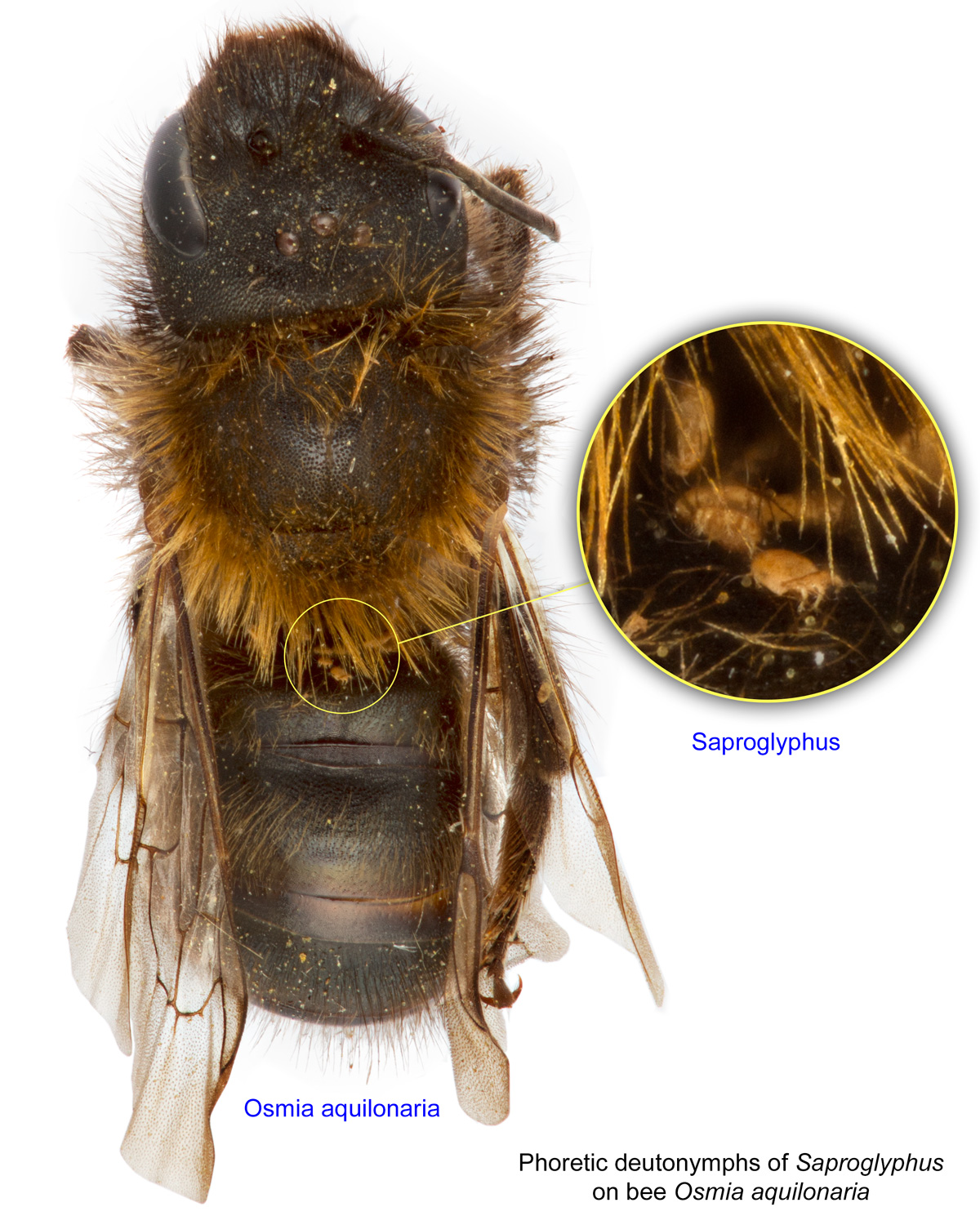
- Saproglyphus

Scientific classification
- Kingdom: Animalia
- Phylum: Arthropoda
- Subphylum: Chelicerata
- Class: Arachnida
- Order: Oribatida
- Superfamily: Hemisarcoptoidea
- Family: Winterschmidtiidae; Oudemans, 1923

Type genus
- Winterschmidtia Oudemans, 1923

Synonyms
- Saproglyphidae Oudemans, 1924; Czenspinskiidae Oudemans, 1927; Oulenziidae Oudemans, 1928; Calvoliinae Turk & Turk, 1957

= Winterschmidtiidae =

Family of mites

Winterschmidtiidae is a family of mites in the order Astigmata.

== Ecology ==
The four subfamilies of Winterschmidtiidae have different habits: Ensliniellinae are associated with Hymenoptera; Winterschmidtiinae with wood-boring insects; Saproglyphinae with decaying materials, plant leaves and fungi; and Oulenziinae with leaves, vertebrate nests and stored foods. They are mostly detritivorous, though most Winterschmidtiinae are instead fungivorous and a few species are herbivorous.

For some specific examples, species of Winterschmidtia and Parawinterschmidtia are associated with beetles living under bark (especially bark beetles), Vespacarus and Kennethiella with eumenine wasps and Vidia with Megachile bees. The genus Psylloglyphus (which is in Oulenziinae) is associated with fleas.

== Genera ==
These twenty-eight genera belong to the family Winterschmidtiidae:

- Acalvolia Fain, 1971
- Allocalvolia Fain & Rack, 1987
- Calvolia Oudemans, 1911
- Congovidia Fain & Elsen, in Fain, 1971
- Crabrovidia Zakhvatkin, 1941
- Czenspinskia Oudemans, 1927
- Ensliniella Vitzthum, 1925
- Gambacarus Mahunka, 1975
- Kennethiella Cooreman, 1954
- Kurosaia Okabe & OConnor, 2002
- Macroharpa Mostafa, 1970
- Monobiacarus Baker & Cunliffe, 1960
- Neocalvolia Hughes, 1970
- Neosuidasia Ranganath & Channabasa, 1983
- Neottiglyphus Volgin, 1974
- Oulenzia Radford, 1950
- Oulenziella Fan et al., 2015
- Parawinterschmidtia Khaustov, 2000
- Procalvolia Fain, 1971
- Riemia Oudemans, 1925
- Saproglyphus Berlese, 1890
- Sphexicozela Mahunka, 1970
- Trypetacarus Fain, 1971
- Vespacarus Baker, 1960
- Vidia Oudemans, 1905
- Winterschmidtia Oudemans, 1923
- Zethacarus Mostafa, 1971
- Zethovidia Mostafa, 1970
