= Schwiebea =

Scientific classification
- Kingdom: Animalia
- Phylum: Arthropoda
- Subphylum: Chelicerata
- Class: Arachnida
- Order: Sarcoptiformes
- Family: Acaridae
- Genus: Schwiebea; Oudemans, 1916

Genus of mites

Schwiebea is a genus of mites in the family Acaridae. It is among the largest in the family with over 60 species.

== Description ==
Adults of Schwiebea are distinguished from other mites by: the absence of many setae, the reduction of supracoxal seta of leg I to a tiny spine, and the absence of Grandjean's organ. Additionally, the propodosomal sclerite has a posterior indentation/incision for up to 50% of its length. Females have a spermatheca (organ for receiving and storing sperm) and its morphology is important for distinguishing species.

== Habitat ==
Schwiebea have been collected from various habitats including vegetation (clover roots, a verbena field, peony rose, Gerbera roots, yams, taro seeds), leaf litter, peat moss, caves, insect rearing containers and even some aquatic environments (fish farms, aquariums, swimming pools). Some species attach phoretically to arthropods such as bark beetles, millipedes and ticks.

== Reproduction ==
Some species of Schwiebea are all-female and reproduce by parthenogenesis, while others use sexual reproduction. Parthenogenesis is thought to have evolved at least three times within the genus.

== Pest status ==
One species, S. similis, is a pest of American ginseng in China. A scientific study found it can also feed on other crops to varying extents, including garlic, potato and Chinese yam.

== Species ==
- Schwiebea afroaustralis Mahunka, 1979
- Schwiebea aksuensis Bugrov, 1995
- Schwiebea aquatilis Fain, 1982
- Schwiebea armata (Mahunka, 1979)
- Schwiebea capitata (Mahunka, 1979)
- Schwiebea cavernicola Vitzthum, 1932
- Schwiebea cavicola Mahunka, 1978
- Schwiebea cepa Karg, 1987
- Schwiebea codognoensis Fain & Pagani, 1989
- Schwiebea coniferae (Sevastianov & Tamam-Nasem-Marros, 1993)
- Schwiebea cuncta Ho, 1993
- Schwiebea danielopoli Fain, 1982
- Schwiebea elongata (Banks, 1906)
- Schwiebea estradai Fain & Ferrando, 1991
- Schwiebea eurynymphae (Oudemans, 1911)
- Schwiebea hibernica Purvis & Evans, 1982
- Schwiebea italica Oudemans, 1924
- Schwiebea jiangxiensis Jiang, 1995
- Schwiebea koerneri Turk & Turk, 1957
- Schwiebea kurilensis Bugrov, 1995
- Schwiebea laphriae (Samsinak, 1956)
- Schwiebea longibursata Fain & Wauthy, 1979
- Schwiebea montana Bugrov, 1995
- Schwiebea neomycolicha Klimov, 1998
- Schwiebea nesbitti Turk & Turk, 1957
- Schwiebea nova (Oudemans, 1906)
- Schwiebea obesa Fain & Fauvel, 1988
- Schwiebea piceae Bugrov, 1995
- Schwiebea podicis (Ashfaq & Chaudhri, 1986)
- Schwiebea ruienensis Fain & Wauthy, 1979
- Schwiebea sakhalinensis Bugrov, 1995
- Schwiebea similis (Manson, 1972)
- Schwiebea subterranea Fain, 1982
- Schwiebea taiwanensis Ho, 1993
- Schwiebea talpa Oudemans, 1916
- Schwiebea tuzkoliensis Bugrov, 1995
- Schwiebea ulmi Jacot, 1936
- Schwiebea zhangzhouensis Lin-Zhonghua & Lin-Baoshu, 2000
