= Aleuroglyphus =

Scientific classification
- Kingdom: Animalia
- Phylum: Arthropoda
- Subphylum: Chelicerata
- Class: Arachnida
- Order: Sarcoptiformes
- Family: Acaridae
- Genus: Aleuroglyphus; Zachvatkin, 1940

Genus of mites

Aleuroglyphus is a genus of mites in the family Acaridae.

== Species ==
- Aleuroglyphus beklemishevi Zachvatkin, 1953
- Aleuroglyphus ovatus (Troupeau, 1879)
- Aleuroglyphus siculus (Fumouze & Robin, 1867)
- Aleuroglyphus zaheri Hafez & Salem, 1988
