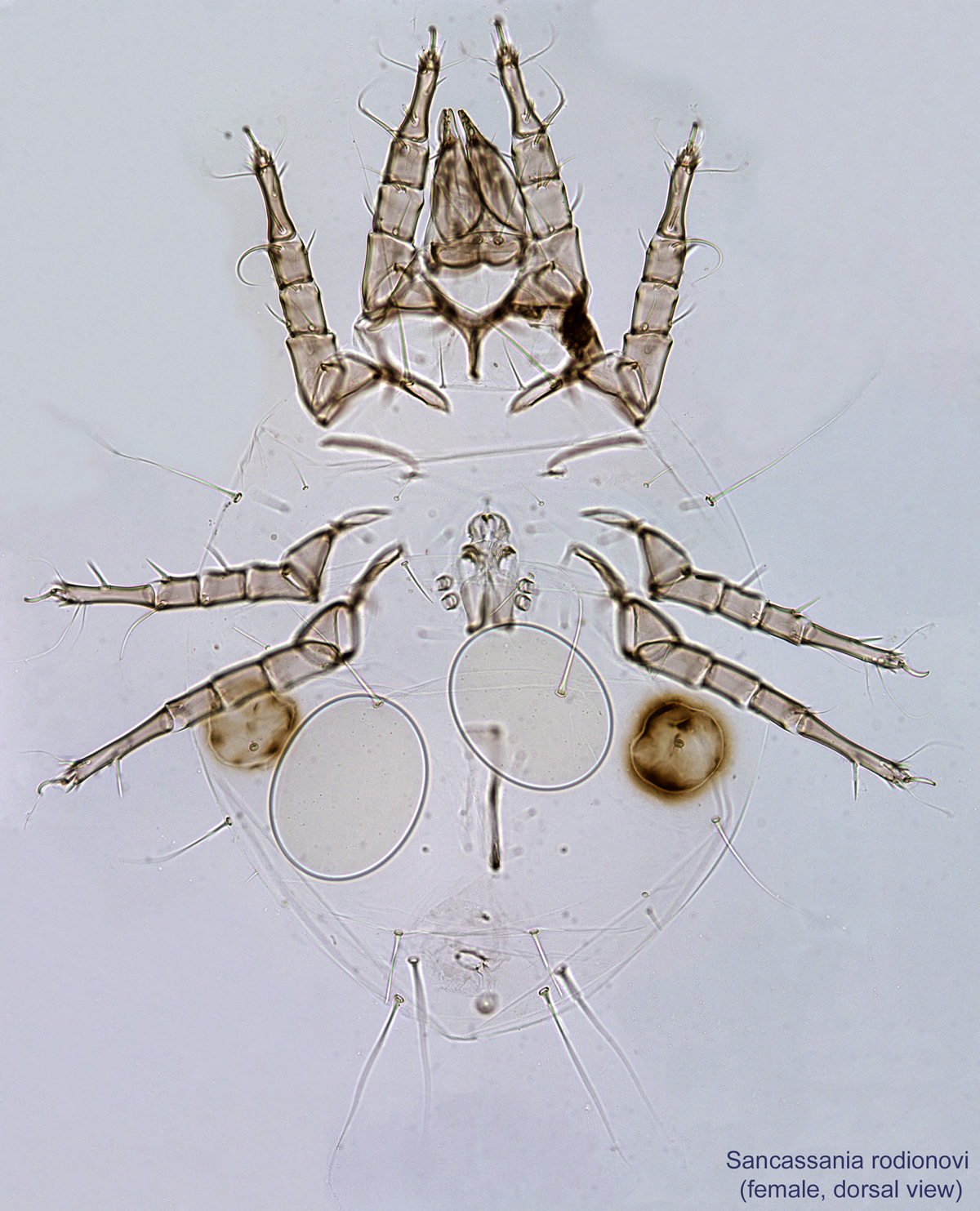
- Dorsal view of a female Sancassania rodionovi

Scientific classification
- Kingdom: Animalia
- Phylum: Arthropoda
- Subphylum: Chelicerata
- Class: Arachnida
- Order: Sarcoptiformes
- Family: Acaridae
- Genus: Sancassania; Oudemans, 1916

= Sancassania =

Genus of mites

Sancassania is a genus of mites in the family Acaridae that contains more than 80 different species.

== Species ==
- Sancassania berlesei (Michael, 1903)
- Sancassania chelone Oudemans, 1916
- Sancassania mironovi Klimov & O'Connor, 2003
- Sancassania mycophaga (Mégnin, 1874)
- Sancassania nesbitti Klimov & O'Connor, 2003
- Sancassania ojibwa Klimov & O'Connor, 2003
- Sancassania oudemansi (Zachvatkin, 1937)
- Sancassania regleri (E. Türk & F. Türk, 1957)
- Sancassania rodionovi (Zachvatkin, 1935)
- Sancassania ultima Samsinak, 1988
