= Olafsenia =

Scientific classification
- Kingdom: Animalia
- Phylum: Arthropoda
- Subphylum: Chelicerata
- Class: Arachnida
- Order: Sarcoptiformes
- Family: Acaridae
- Genus: Olafsenia; Oudemans, 1927

Genus of mites

Olafsenia is a genus of mites in the family Acaridae.

== Species ==
- Olafsenia trifolium (Oudemans, 1901)
