= Ebertia =

Scientific classification
- Kingdom: Animalia
- Phylum: Arthropoda
- Subphylum: Chelicerata
- Class: Arachnida
- Order: Sarcoptiformes
- Family: Acaridae
- Genus: Ebertia; Oudemans, 1924

Genus of mites

Ebertia is a genus of mites in the family Acaridae.

== Species ==
- Ebertia australis (Oudemans, 1917)
