= Podoglyphus =

Scientific classification
- Kingdom: Animalia
- Phylum: Arthropoda
- Subphylum: Chelicerata
- Class: Arachnida
- Order: Sarcoptiformes
- Family: Acaridae
- Genus: Podoglyphus; Oudemans, 1937

Genus of mites

Podoglyphus is a genus of mites in the family Acaridae.

== Species ==
- Podoglyphus buski (Murray, 1877)
