= Acotyledon (mite) =

Scientific classification
- Kingdom: Animalia
- Phylum: Arthropoda
- Subphylum: Chelicerata
- Class: Arachnida
- Order: Sarcoptiformes
- Family: Acaridae
- Genus: Acotyledon; Oudemans, 1903

Genus of mites

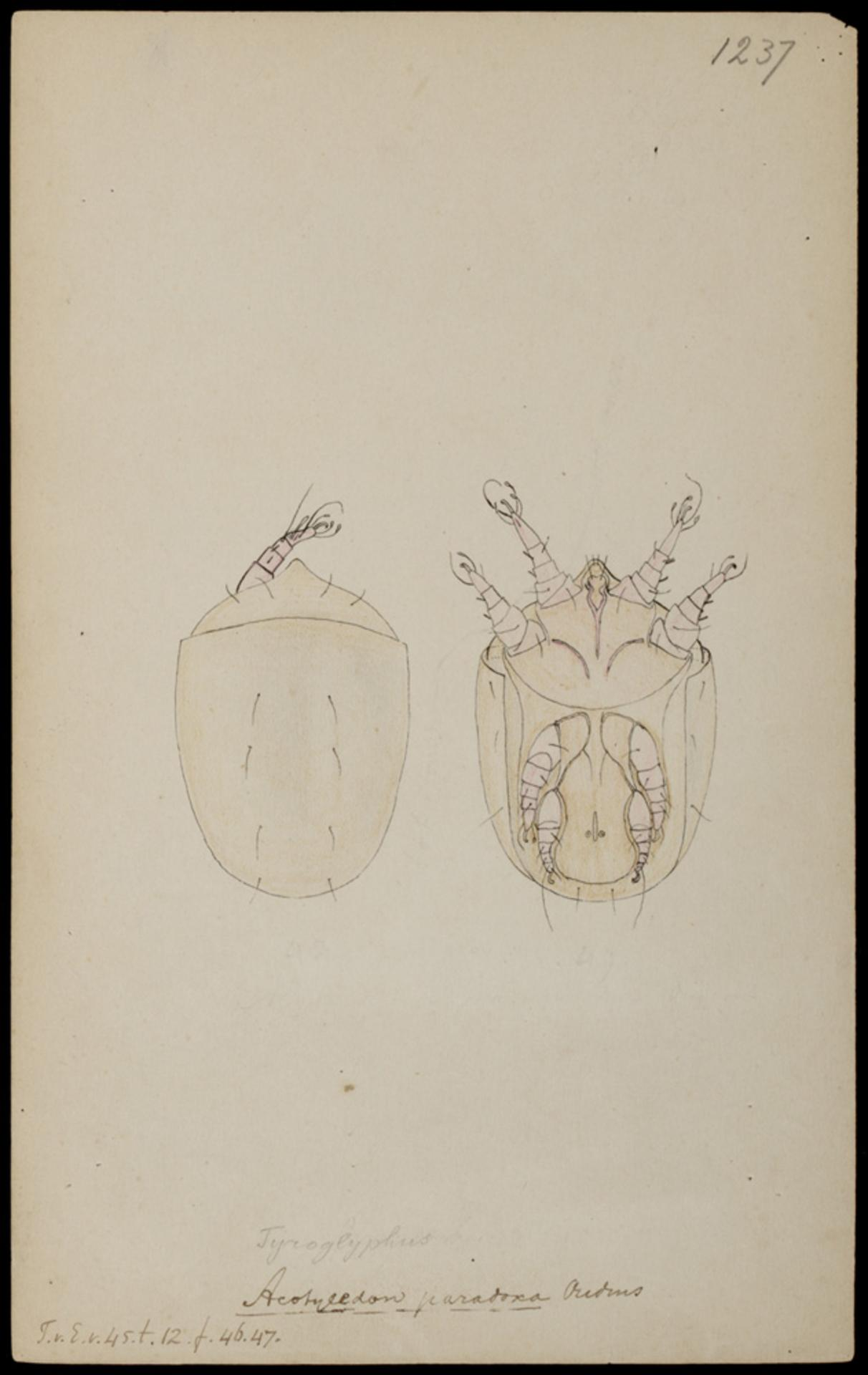
Acotyledon paradoxa (Oudemans)

Acotyledon is a genus of mites in the family Acaridae.

== Species ==
- Acotyledon agilis (Canestrini, 1888)
- Acotyledon bellulus Ashfaq & Sher, 2002
- Acotyledon distantis Ashfaq & Chaudhri
- Acotyledon embio Ashfaq, Sarwar & Parvez, 1999
- Acotyledon falki Ashfaq & Sher, 2002
- Acotyledon haripuriensis Ashfaq, Sher & Chaudhri, 1990
- Acotyledon krameri (Berlese, 1881)
- Acotyledon lamiai Eraky, 1998
- Acotyledon longsetoses Eraky, 1999
- Acotyledon manuri Eraky, 1999
- Acotyledon memphiticus Sevastianov & Gad H. Rady, in Sevastyanov & Ged-Khamada-Khassan-Kh-Rad 1991
- Acotyledon moshtohorensis Sevastianov & Gad H. Rady, in Sevastyanov & Ged-Khamada-Khassan-Kh-Rad 1991
- Acotyledon mykytowyczi Womersley, 1955
- Acotyledon mystax Mahunka, 1978
- Acotyledon neotomae Fain & Whitaker, 1986
- Acotyledon nerminka Eraky, 1999
- Acotyledon pedispinifer (Nesbitt, 1944)
- Acotyledon privus Ashfaq, Sarwar & Parvez, 1999
- Acotyledon pytho Ashfaq & Chaudhri
- Acotyledon rhizoglyphoides (Zachvatkin, 1937)
- Acotyledon tariqii Ashfaq, Sher & Chaudhri, 1990
- Acotyledon thosmos Ashfaq & Chaudhri
- Acotyledon tshernyshevi Zakhvatkin, 1941
