= Horstia =

Scientific classification
- Kingdom: Animalia
- Phylum: Arthropoda
- Subphylum: Chelicerata
- Class: Arachnida
- Order: Sarcoptiformes
- Family: Acaridae
- Genus: Horstia; Oudemans, 1905

Genus of mites

Horstia is a genus of mites in the family Acaridae.

== Species ==
- Horstia amplisucta Fain & Camerik, 1978
- Horstia brasiliensis Fain & Camerik, 1978
- Horstia longa Fain & Chmielewski, 1987
- Horstia major Bischoff-de-Alzuet & Abrahamovich, 1987
- Horstia minor Bischoff-de-Alzuet & Abrahamovich, 1987
- Horstia malaysiensis (Fain, Lukoschus & Nadchatram, 1982)
- Horstia monstruosus (Vitzthum, 1919)
- Horstia ornatus (Oudemans, 1900)
- Horstia pulcherrima (Vitzthum, 1919)
- Horstia rwandae Fain, 1984
- Horstia virginica Baker, 1962
