= Viedebanttia =

Scientific classification
- Kingdom: Animalia
- Phylum: Arthropoda
- Subphylum: Chelicerata
- Class: Arachnida
- Order: Sarcoptiformes
- Family: Acaridae
- Genus: Viedebanttia; Oudemans, 1929

Genus of mites

Viedebanttia is a genus of mites in the family Acaridae.

== Species ==
- Viedebanttia coniferae (Sevastianov & Marroch, 1993)
- Viedebanttia diamanus Fain & Schwan, 1984
- Viedebanttia egorovi Klimov, 1998
- Viedebanttia fuscipes (Vitzthum, 1924)
- Viedebanttia longipes (Volgin, 1951)
- Viedebanttia macrocnemis (Zachvatkin, 1941)
- Viedebanttia schmitzi Oudemans, 1929
- Viedebanttia vitzthumi (Mahunka, 1979)
