= Garsaultia =

Scientific classification
- Kingdom: Animalia
- Phylum: Arthropoda
- Subphylum: Chelicerata
- Class: Arachnida
- Order: Sarcoptiformes
- Family: Acaridae
- Genus: Garsaultia; Oudemans, 1916

Genus of mites

Garsaultia is a genus of mites in the family Acaridae.

== Species ==
- Garsaultia testudo Oudemans, 1916
