= Cerophagopsis =

Scientific classification
- Kingdom: Animalia
- Phylum: Arthropoda
- Subphylum: Chelicerata
- Class: Arachnida
- Order: Sarcoptiformes
- Family: Acaridae
- Genus: Cerophagopsis; Zachvatkin, 1941

Genus of mites

Cerophagopsis is a genus of mites in the family Acaridae.

== Species ==
- Cerophagopsis indicus (Potter & Olsen, 1987)
- Cerophagopsis skorikovi Zachvatkin, 1941
