= Dwigubskyia =

Scientific classification
- Kingdom: Animalia
- Phylum: Arthropoda
- Subphylum: Chelicerata
- Class: Arachnida
- Order: Mesostigmata
- Family: Dwigubskyiidae; Vitzthum, 1941
- Genus: Dwigubskyia; Oudemans, 1936
- Species: D. togatus

Binomial name
- Dwigubskyia togatus (C. L. Koch, 1836)

Genus of mites

Dwigubskyia togatus is a species of mite placed in its own family Dwigubskyiidae, in the order Mesostigmata.
