= Volginia =

Scientific classification
- Kingdom: Animalia
- Phylum: Arthropoda
- Subphylum: Chelicerata
- Class: Arachnida
- Order: Sarcoptiformes
- Family: Acaridae
- Genus: Volginia; Kadzhaya, 1967

Genus of mites

Volginia is a genus of mites in the family Acaridae.

== Species ==
- Volginia talyshiana Kadzhaya, 1967
