= Bromeliaglyphus =

Scientific classification
- Kingdom: Animalia
- Phylum: Arthropoda
- Subphylum: Chelicerata
- Class: Arachnida
- Order: Sarcoptiformes
- Family: Acaridae
- Genus: Bromeliaglyphus; H.H.J. Nesbitt, 1985

Genus of mites

Bromeliaglyphus is a genus of mites in the family Acaridae.

== Species ==
- Bromeliaglyphus monteverdensis H.H.J. Nesbitt, 1985
