= Rhizoglyphoides =

Scientific classification
- Kingdom: Animalia
- Phylum: Arthropoda
- Subphylum: Chelicerata
- Class: Arachnida
- Order: Sarcoptiformes
- Family: Acaridae
- Genus: Rhizoglyphoides; V. I. Volgin, 1978

Genus of mites

Rhizoglyphoides is a genus of mites in the family Acaridae.

== Species ==
- Rhizoglyphoides nidicola V. I. Volgin, 1978
