= Calvoliopsis =

Scientific classification
- Kingdom: Animalia
- Phylum: Arthropoda
- Subphylum: Chelicerata
- Class: Arachnida
- Order: Sarcoptiformes
- Family: Acaridae
- Genus: Calvoliopsis; Mahunka, 1973

Genus of mites

Calvoliopsis is a genus of mites in the family Acaridae.

== Species ==
- Calvoliopsis rugosus Mahunka, 1973
