= Madaglyphus =

Scientific classification
- Kingdom: Animalia
- Phylum: Arthropoda
- Subphylum: Chelicerata
- Class: Arachnida
- Order: Sarcoptiformes
- Family: Acaridae
- Genus: Madaglyphus; Fain, 1971

Genus of mites

Madaglyphus is a genus of mites in the family Acaridae.

== Species ==
- Madaglyphus chaetolamina (C. A. Ferguson, 1985)
- Madaglyphus javensis Haines & Lynch, 1987
- Madaglyphus legendrei A. Fain, 1971
