= Troglocoptes =

Scientific classification
- Kingdom: Animalia
- Phylum: Arthropoda
- Subphylum: Chelicerata
- Class: Arachnida
- Order: Sarcoptiformes
- Family: Acaridae
- Genus: Troglocoptes; Fain, 1966

Genus of mites

Troglocoptes is a genus of mites in the family Acaridae.

== Species ==
- Troglocoptes longibursatus Fain & Mahunka, 1990
- Troglocoptes luciae Fain, 1966
