= Boletacarus =

Scientific classification
- Kingdom: Animalia
- Phylum: Arthropoda
- Subphylum: Chelicerata
- Class: Arachnida
- Order: Sarcoptiformes
- Family: Acaridae
- Genus: Boletacarus; V. I. Volgin & S. V. Mironov, 1980

Genus of mites

Boletacarus is a genus of mites in the family Acaridae.

== Species ==
- Boletacarus globosus (Berlese, 1921)
- Boletacarus sibiricus V. I. Volgin & S. V. Mironov, 1980
