= Australhypopus =

Scientific classification
- Kingdom: Animalia
- Phylum: Arthropoda
- Subphylum: Chelicerata
- Class: Arachnida
- Order: Sarcoptiformes
- Family: Acaridae
- Genus: Australhypopus; Fain & Friend, 1984

Genus of mites

Australhypopus is a genus of mites in the family Acaridae.

== Species ==
- Australhypopus flagellifer Fain & Friend, 1984
