= Spinacaropus =

Scientific classification
- Kingdom: Animalia
- Phylum: Arthropoda
- Subphylum: Chelicerata
- Class: Arachnida
- Order: Sarcoptiformes
- Family: Acaridae
- Genus: Spinacaropus; Fain & A. M. Camerik, 1978

Genus of mites

Spinacaropus is a genus of mites in the family Acaridae.

== Species ==
- Spinacaropus brasiliensis Fain & A. M. Camerik, 1978
