= Sinosuidasia =

Scientific classification
- Kingdom: Animalia
- Phylum: Arthropoda
- Subphylum: Chelicerata
- Class: Arachnida
- Order: Sarcoptiformes
- Family: Acaridae
- Genus: Sinosuidasia; Jiang, 1996

Genus of mites

Sinosuidasia is a genus of mites in the family Acaridae.

== Species ==
- Sinosuidasia jinyunensis Zhang & Li, 2002
- Sinosuidasia orientalis Jiang, 1996
