= Myrmolichus =

Scientific classification
- Kingdom: Animalia
- Phylum: Arthropoda
- Subphylum: Chelicerata
- Class: Arachnida
- Order: Sarcoptiformes
- Family: Acaridae
- Genus: Myrmolichus; Türk & Türk, 1957

Genus of mites

Myrmolichus is a genus of mites in the family Acaridae.

== Species ==
- Myrmolichus greimae Türk & Türk, 1957
