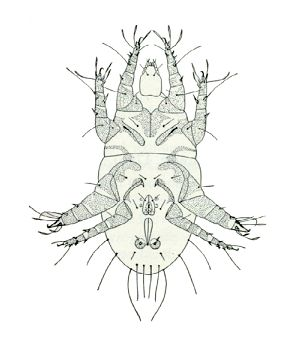
- Rhizoglyphus echinopus

Scientific classification
- Kingdom: Animalia
- Phylum: Arthropoda
- Subphylum: Chelicerata
- Class: Arachnida
- Order: Sarcoptiformes
- Family: Acaridae
- Genus: Rhizoglyphus; Claparédè, 1869

= Rhizoglyphus =

Genus of mites

Rhizoglyphus is a genus of mites in the family Acaridae. It has a worldwide distribution and is often associated with the bulbs, corms or tubers of plants.

== Description and life cycle ==
Rhizoglyphus begin their lives as whitish, ellipsoidal eggs that are 0.12 mm long. These hatch into larvae, which are oval, white and have three pairs of legs. Larvae are 0.15-0.2 mm long on hatching and grow to 0.25 mm long. Larvae then develop into protonymphs, which are 0.4 mm long and (compared to larvae) gain an additional leg pair and two genital suckers.

Under certain conditions such as high population density, protonymphs develop into deutonymphs (or hypopi), a quiescent stage that does not feed. This life stage is convex dorsally and flattened ventrally, brown in colour, 0.2-0.3 mm long, heavily sclerotised, lacks mouthparts and has a ventral sucker plate. The purpose of the deutonymph stage is to attach to insects and be carried to other bulbs (phoresis). Deutonymphs are resistant to starvation and desiccation during adverse conditions.

The tritonymph stage follows the protonymph (or deutonymph). Tritonymphs are about 0.5 mm long and have three or four genital suckers. They eventually develop into adults.

Adults are 0.5-0.9 mm long, shiny, white and somewhat transparent, and have reddish brown appendages. Unlike tritonymphs, they have distinct genital apertures. Some features which distinguish adult Rhizoglyphus from other mites are: 4 pairs of prodorsal setae and 12 pairs of dorsal hysterosomal setae, external vertical setae small/vestigial and situated about halfway along sides of prodorsal shield, supracoxal setae smooth, and tarsi I and II each with a proximal conical spine near bases of solenidion and famulus.

The duration of the life cycle depends on Rhizoglyphus species, diet, temperature and relative humidity. At a temperature of 25 °C, it can be as short as 12.2 days for Rhizoglyphus robini and 13.9 days for R. echinopus. Adults live longer (for up to 121 days) at lower temperatures. Males tend to live twice as long as females in this genus.

== Host arthropods ==
As noted previously, Rhizoglyphus deutonymphs ride on other, larger arthropods for dispersal. They have been collected from scarab beetles, weevils, various flies and fleas.

== Host plants ==
Rhizoglyphus feed on a range of ornamental (e.g. Dahlia, Eucharis, Gladiolus, Hyacinthus, Iris, lily, Narcissus, orchid, tulip) and crop plants (e.g. barley, carrot, garlic, onion, potato, sweet potato, taro). While underground plant parts are most commonly attacked, the mites have also been collected from leaves, stems and seeds.

== Biochemistry ==
Rhizoglyphus secrete an alarm pheromone from opisthonotal glands. This pheromone has neryl-formate as its main component and citral and α-acaridial as minor components. Its secretion triggers escape behaviour in other mites and it may be involved in mite defense against predators. Citral and α-acaridial also have antifungal activity.

These mites also have a range of cuticular chemicals. Hexyl rhizoglyphinate is another antifungal, while the roles of other chemicals remain unknown.

== Pest status ==
As noted previously, Rhizoglyphus feed on a range of plants. Infested bulbs may rot and fail to produce new growth, or new growth may be discoloured, stunted and distorted. In tulips, Rhizoglyphus may enter prematurely opened buds and cause bud necrosis.

Bulbs that are damaged or infested with Fusarium fungus are more vulnerable to attack.

Due to their pest status, these mites are classified as quarantine species by many countries such as Australia and New Zealand.

== Control measures ==
Rough handling of bulbs should be avoided as this can cause damage that allows Rhizoglyphus to enter. Keeping bulbs dry also generally prevents them from being attacked, since the mites cannot withstand drought.

A range of pesticides have been used, but Rhizoglyphus are resistant to a number of pesticides and there is concern about pesticides affecting non-target species.

There has been research on biological control of this genus of mites. Most of this has involved predatory mites, but entomopathogenic nematodes have also been considered.

== Species ==
- Rhizoglyphus actinidia Zhang, in Zhang, Jiang & Zeng 1994
- Rhizoglyphus algericus Fain, 1988
- Rhizoglyphus algidus Berlese, 1920
- Rhizoglyphus alliensis Nesbitt, 1988
- Rhizoglyphus allii Bu & Wang, 1995
- Rhizoglyphus balmensis Fain, 1988
- Rhizoglyphus costarricensis Bonilla, Ochoa & Aguilar, 1990
- Rhizoglyphus echinopus (Fumouze & Robin, 1868)
- Rhizoglyphus eutarsus Berlese, 1920
- Rhizoglyphus frickorum Nesbitt, 1988
- Rhizoglyphus fumouzi Nesbitt, 1993
- Rhizoglyphus globosus Berlese, 1920
- Rhizoglyphus longispinosus Ho & Chen, 2001
- Rhizoglyphus narcissi Lin & Ding, 1990
- Rhizoglyphus occidentalis (Sevastianov & Tamam-Nasem-Marros, 1993)
- Rhizoglyphus occurrens Berlese, 1920
- Rhizoglyphus robini Claparédè, 1869
- Rhizoglyphus robustus Nesbitt, 1988
- Rhizoglyphus sportilionis Lombardini, 1947
- Rhizoglyphus termitum Womersley, 1941
- Rhizoglyphus trouessarti Berlese, 1897
- Rhizoglyphus tsutienensis Ho & Chen, 2000
