= Baloghella =

Scientific classification
- Kingdom: Animalia
- Phylum: Arthropoda
- Subphylum: Chelicerata
- Class: Arachnida
- Order: Sarcoptiformes
- Family: Acaridae
- Genus: Baloghella; Mahunka, 1963

Genus of mites

Baloghella is a genus of mites in the family Acaridae.

== Species ==
- Baloghella melis Mahunka, 1963
