= Mycetosancassania =

Scientific classification
- Kingdom: Animalia
- Phylum: Arthropoda
- Subphylum: Chelicerata
- Class: Arachnida
- Order: Sarcoptiformes
- Family: Acaridae
- Genus: Mycetosancassania; Klimov, 2000

Genus of mites

Mycetosancassania is a genus of mites in the family Acaridae.

== Species ==
- Mycetosancassania grifolapholiotae Klimov, 2000
