= Machadoglyphus =

Scientific classification
- Kingdom: Animalia
- Phylum: Arthropoda
- Subphylum: Chelicerata
- Class: Arachnida
- Order: Sarcoptiformes
- Family: Acaridae
- Genus: Machadoglyphus; Mahunka, 1963

Genus of mites

Machadoglyphus is a genus of mites in the family Acaridae.

== Species ==
- Machadoglyphus termitophilus Mahunka, 1963
