= Trichopsyllopus =

Scientific classification
- Kingdom: Animalia
- Phylum: Arthropoda
- Subphylum: Chelicerata
- Class: Arachnida
- Order: Sarcoptiformes
- Family: Acaridae
- Genus: Trichopsyllopus; Fain & G. T. Baker, 1983

Genus of mites

Trichopsyllopus is a genus of mites in the family Acaridae.

== Species ==
- Trichopsyllopus oregonensis Fain & G. T. Baker, 1983
