= Passaloglyphus =

Scientific classification
- Kingdom: Animalia
- Phylum: Arthropoda
- Subphylum: Chelicerata
- Class: Arachnida
- Order: Sarcoptiformes
- Family: Acaridae
- Genus: Passaloglyphus; Mahunka & Samsinak, 1972

Genus of mites

Passaloglyphus is a genus of mites in the family Acaridae.

== Species ==
- Passaloglyphus rosickyi Mahunka & Samsinak, 1972
