= Paraceroglyphus =

Scientific classification
- Kingdom: Animalia
- Phylum: Arthropoda
- Subphylum: Chelicerata
- Class: Arachnida
- Order: Sarcoptiformes
- Family: Acaridae
- Genus: Paraceroglyphus; Fain & Beaucournu, 1979

Genus of mites

Paraceroglyphus is a genus of mites in the family Acaridae.

== Species ==
- Paraceroglyphus californicus Fain & Schwan, 1984
- Paraceroglyphus cynomydis O'Connor & Pfaffenberger, 1987
- Paraceroglyphus metes Fain & Beaucournu, 1973
