= Lamtoglyphus =

Scientific classification
- Domain: Eukaryota
- Kingdom: Animalia
- Phylum: Arthropoda
- Subphylum: Chelicerata
- Class: Arachnida
- Order: Sarcoptiformes
- Family: Acaridae
- Genus: Lamtoglyphus; Fain, 1975

Genus of mites

Lamtoglyphus is a genus of mites in the family Acaridae.

== Species ==
- Lamtoglyphus coineaui Fain, 1975
