= Kargoecius =

Scientific classification
- Domain: Eukaryota
- Kingdom: Animalia
- Phylum: Arthropoda
- Subphylum: Chelicerata
- Class: Arachnida
- Order: Sarcoptiformes
- Family: Acaridae
- Genus: Kargoecius; Fain, 1985

Genus of mites

Kargoecius is a genus of mites in the family Acaridae.

== Species ==
- Kargoecius longiseta (Karg, 1971)
