= Sennertionyx =

Scientific classification
- Kingdom: Animalia
- Phylum: Arthropoda
- Subphylum: Chelicerata
- Class: Arachnida
- Order: Sarcoptiformes
- Family: Acaridae
- Genus: Sennertionyx; Zachvatkin, 1941

Genus of mites

Sennertionyx is a genus of mites in the family Acaridae.

== Species ==
- Sennertionyx manicati (Giard, 1900)
