= Medeus =

Scientific classification
- Kingdom: Animalia
- Phylum: Arthropoda
- Subphylum: Chelicerata
- Class: Arachnida
- Order: Sarcoptiformes
- Family: Acaridae
- Genus: Medeus; Volgin, 1974

Genus of mites

Medeus is a genus of mites in the family Acaridae.

== Species ==
- Medeus ithacaensis O'Connor, 1997
- Medeus vesparius Volgin, 1974
