= Diadasiopus =

Scientific classification
- Kingdom: Animalia
- Phylum: Arthropoda
- Subphylum: Chelicerata
- Class: Arachnida
- Order: Sarcoptiformes
- Family: Acaridae
- Genus: Diadasiopus; O'Connor, 1997

Genus of mites

Diadasiopus is a genus of mites in the family Acaridae.

== Species ==
- Diadasiopus alexanderi O'Connor & Daneshvar, 1999
- Diadasiopus eickworti O'Connor, 1997
