= Thectochloracarus =

Scientific classification
- Kingdom: Animalia
- Phylum: Arthropoda
- Subphylum: Chelicerata
- Class: Arachnida
- Order: Sarcoptiformes
- Family: Acaridae
- Genus: Thectochloracarus; Fain, Engel, Flechtmann & OConnor, 1999

Genus of mites

Thectochloracarus is a genus of mites in the family Acaridae.

== Species ==
- Thectochloracarus neotropicalis Fain, Engel, Flechtmann & OConnor, 1999
