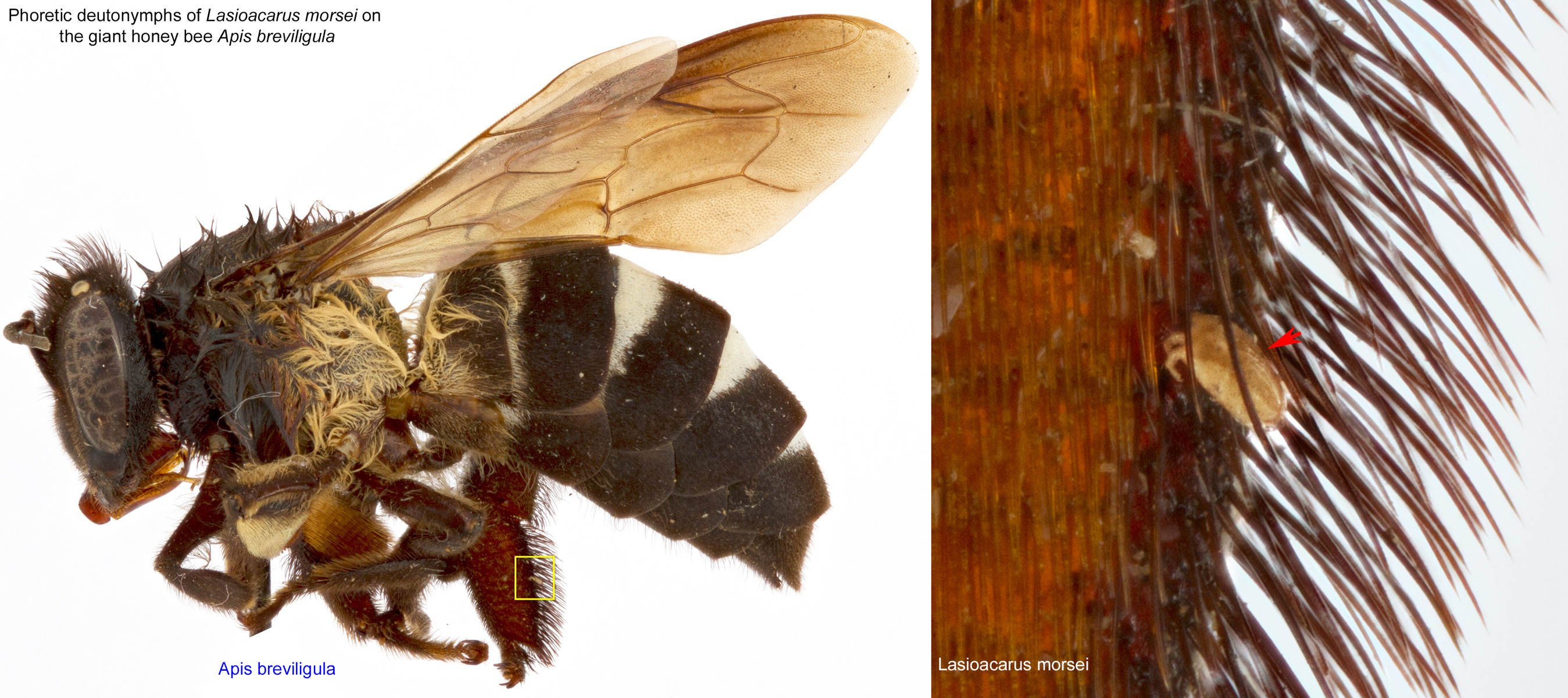

Scientific classification
- Kingdom: Animalia
- Phylum: Arthropoda
- Subphylum: Chelicerata
- Class: Arachnida
- Order: Sarcoptiformes
- Family: Acaridae
- Genus: Lasioacarus; Kadzhyaya, 1968

= Lasioacarus =

Genus of mites

Lasioacarus is a genus of mites in the family Acaridae.

== Species ==
- Lasioacarus nidicolus Kadzhaya & Sevastyanov, 1967
