= Diphtheroglyphus =

Scientific classification
- Kingdom: Animalia
- Phylum: Arthropoda
- Subphylum: Chelicerata
- Class: Arachnida
- Order: Sarcoptiformes
- Family: Acaridae
- Genus: Diphtheroglyphus; Nesbitt, 1950

Genus of mites

Diphtheroglyphus is a genus of mites in the family Acaridae.

== Species ==
- Diphtheroglyphus maculata Nesbitt, 1950
