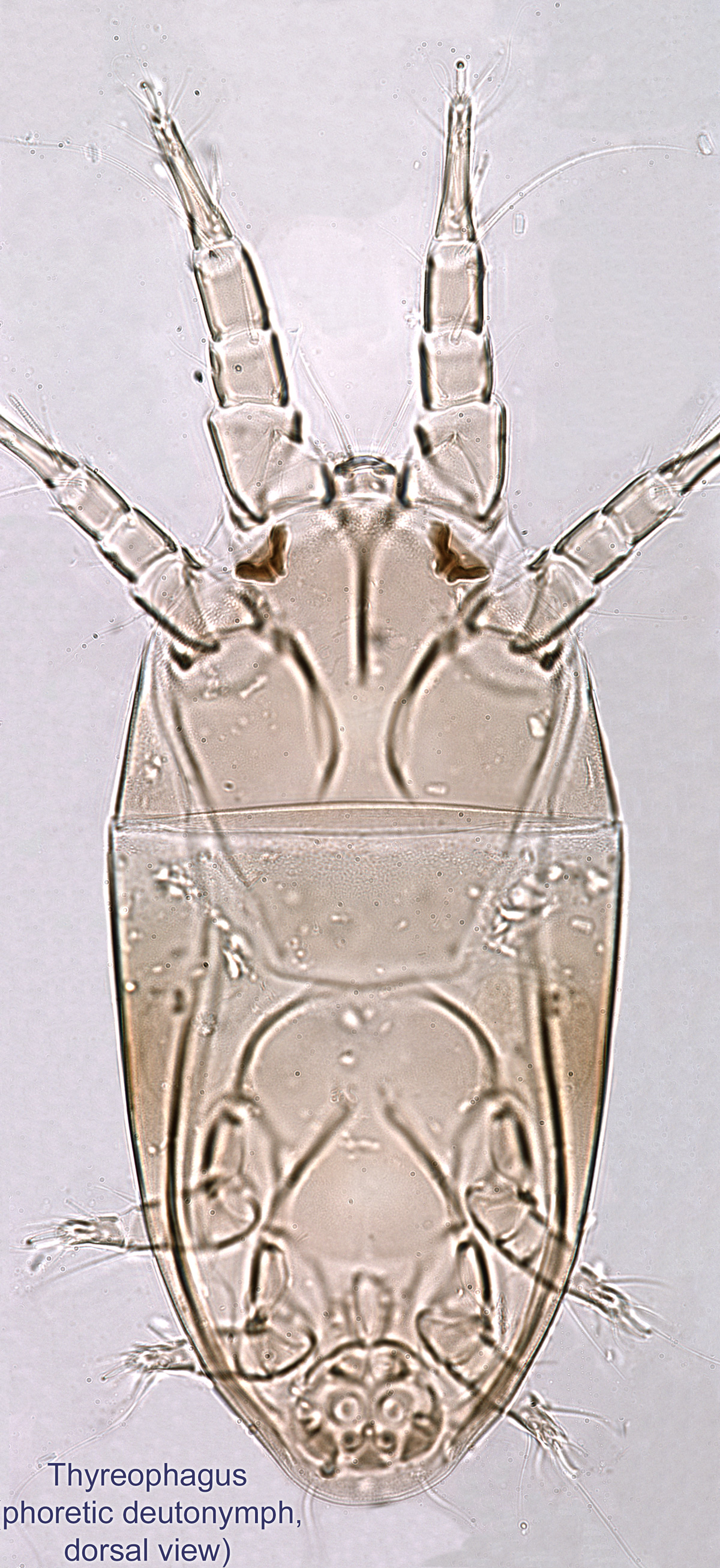

Scientific classification
- Kingdom: Animalia
- Phylum: Arthropoda
- Subphylum: Chelicerata
- Class: Arachnida
- Order: Sarcoptiformes
- Family: Acaridae
- Genus: Thyreophagus; Rondani, 1874

= Thyreophagus =

Genus of Arachnida

Thyreophagus is a genus of mites in the family Acaridae.

== Species ==
- Thyreophagus ais Klimov et al., 2023
- Thyreophagus africanus Mahunka, 1974
- Thyreophagus aleurophagus (Sicher, 1894)
- Thyreophagus angusta (Banks, 1906)
- Thyreophagus annae (Sevastianov & Kivganov, 1992)
- Thyreophagus athiasae (Fain, 1982)
- Thyreophagus australis Clark, 2009
- Thyreophagus berlesianus Zachvatkin, 1941
- Thyreophagus berxi Klimov et al., 2023
- Thyreophagus cercus Zhang, in Zhang, Jiang & Zeng 1994
- Thyreophagus cooremani Fain, 1982
- Thyreophagus corticalis (Michael, 1885)
- Thyreophagus cynododactylon El-Bishlawy, 1990
- Thyreophagus entomophagus (Laboulbéne & Robin, 1862)
- Thyreophagus evansi (Fain, 1982)
- Thyreophagus gallegoi Portus & Gomez, 1980
- Thyreophagus hobe Klimov et al., 2023
- Thyreophagus incanus (Fain, 1987)
- Thyreophagus johnstoni (Fain, 1982)
- Thyreophagus leclercqi (Fain, 1982)
- Thyreophagus lignieri (Zachvatkin, 1953)
- Thyreophagus longiretinalis (Klimov, 1999)
- Thyreophagus macfarlanei (Fain, 1982)
- Thyreophagus magnus Berlese, 1910
- Thyreophagus odyneri Fain, 1982
- Thyreophagus ojibwe Klimov et al., 2023
- Thyreophagus passerinus (de-la-Cruz, 1990)
- Thyreophagus polezhaevi (Zakhvatkin, 1953)
- Thyreophagus potawatomorum Klimov et al., 2023
- Thyreophagus rwandanus (Fain, 1982)
- Thyreophagus spinitarsus (Fain, 1982)
- Thyreophagus tridens (Fain & Lukoschus, 1986)
- Thyreophagus vermicularis Fain & Lukoschus, 1982
