= Contromelisia =

Scientific classification
- Kingdom: Animalia
- Phylum: Arthropoda
- Subphylum: Chelicerata
- Class: Arachnida
- Order: Sarcoptiformes
- Family: Acaridae
- Genus: Contromelisia; Samsinak, 1969

Genus of mites

Contromelisia is a genus of mites in the family Acaridae.

== Species ==
- Contromelisia danielae (Haitlinger, 1989)
- Contromelisia vietnamensis Samsinak, 1969
