= Irianopus =

Scientific classification
- Kingdom: Animalia
- Phylum: Arthropoda
- Subphylum: Chelicerata
- Class: Arachnida
- Order: Sarcoptiformes
- Family: Acaridae
- Genus: Irianopus; Fain, 1986

Genus of mites

Irianopus is a genus of mites in the family Acaridae.

== Species ==
- Irianopus brevis Fain, 1986
