= Psyllopus =

Scientific classification
- Kingdom: Animalia
- Phylum: Arthropoda
- Subphylum: Chelicerata
- Class: Arachnida
- Order: Sarcoptiformes
- Family: Acaridae
- Genus: Psyllopus; Fain & J. C. Beaucournu, 1993

Genus of mites

Psyllopus is a genus of mites in the family Acaridae.

== Species ==
- Psyllopus gerbillicola Fain & J. C. Beaucournu, 1993
