= Aellenella =

Scientific classification
- Kingdom: Animalia
- Phylum: Arthropoda
- Subphylum: Chelicerata
- Class: Arachnida
- Order: Sarcoptiformes
- Family: Acaridae
- Genus: Aellenella; S. Mahunka, 1978

Genus of mites

Aellenella is a genus of mites in the family Acaridae.

== Species ==
- Aellenella strinatii S. Mahunka, 1978
