= Chibidaria =

Scientific classification
- Kingdom: Animalia
- Phylum: Arthropoda
- Subphylum: Chelicerata
- Class: Arachnida
- Order: Sarcoptiformes
- Family: Acaridae
- Genus: Chibidaria; Sasa, 1952

Genus of mites

Chibidaria is a genus of mites in the family Acaridae.

== Species ==
- Chibidaria tokyoensis Sasa, 1952
