= Myrmoglyphus =

Scientific classification
- Kingdom: Animalia
- Phylum: Arthropoda
- Subphylum: Chelicerata
- Class: Arachnida
- Order: Sarcoptiformes
- Family: Acaridae
- Genus: Myrmoglyphus; Vitzthum, 1935

Genus of mites

Myrmoglyphus is a genus of mites in the family Acaridae.

== Species ==
- Myrmoglyphus bipilis Vitzthum, 1935
