= Lackerbaueria =

Scientific classification
- Domain: Eukaryota
- Kingdom: Animalia
- Phylum: Arthropoda
- Subphylum: Chelicerata
- Class: Arachnida
- Order: Sarcoptiformes
- Family: Acaridae
- Genus: Lackerbaueria; Zachvatkin, 1941

Genus of mites

Lackerbaueria is a genus of mites in the family Acaridae.

== Species ==
- Lackerbaueria errans Ashfag & Sarwar, 1999
- Lackerbaueria fatigo Sarwar, 2000
- Lackerbaueria lahoriensis Ashfaq, Mustafa-Aheer, Chaudhri & Majid, 1988
