= Lowryacarus =

Scientific classification
- Domain: Eukaryota
- Kingdom: Animalia
- Phylum: Arthropoda
- Subphylum: Chelicerata
- Class: Arachnida
- Order: Sarcoptiformes
- Family: Acaridae
- Genus: Lowryacarus; Fain, 1986

Genus of mites

Lowryacarus is a genus of mites in the family Acaridae.

== Species ==
- Lowryacarus longipes Fain, 1986
