= Reckiacarus =

Scientific classification
- Kingdom: Animalia
- Phylum: Arthropoda
- Subphylum: Chelicerata
- Class: Arachnida
- Order: Sarcoptiformes
- Family: Acaridae
- Genus: Reckiacarus; G.Kadzhaya, 1972

Genus of mites

Reckiacarus is a genus of mites in the family Acaridae.

== Species ==
- Reckiacarus anakopeiensis G.Kadzhaya, 1972
