= Fagacarus =

Scientific classification
- Kingdom: Animalia
- Phylum: Arthropoda
- Subphylum: Chelicerata
- Class: Arachnida
- Order: Sarcoptiformes
- Family: Acaridae
- Subfamily: Fagacarinae; Fain & R. A. Norton, 1979
- Genus: Fagacarus; Fain & R. A. Norton, 1979
- Species: F. verrucosus

Binomial name
- Fagacarus verrucosus Fain & R. A. Norton, 1979

Genus of mites

Fagacarus is a genus of mites in the family Acaridae. It contains a single described species, Fagacarus verrucosus, and at least two undescribed species. Fagacarus species feed on fungi in decaying wood.
