= Terglyphus =

Scientific classification
- Kingdom: Animalia
- Phylum: Arthropoda
- Subphylum: Chelicerata
- Class: Arachnida
- Order: Sarcoptiformes
- Family: Acaridae
- Genus: Terglyphus; Samsinak, 1965

Genus of mites

Terglyphus is a genus of mites in the family Acaridae.

== Species ==
- Terglyphus padrtorum Samsinak, 1965
