= Mezorhizoglyphus =

Scientific classification
- Kingdom: Animalia
- Phylum: Arthropoda
- Subphylum: Chelicerata
- Class: Arachnida
- Order: Sarcoptiformes
- Family: Acaridae
- Genus: Mezorhizoglyphus; Kadzhaya, 1966

Genus of mites

Mezorhizoglyphus is a genus of mites in the family Acaridae.

== Species ==
- Mezorhizoglyphus bratskensis Klimov, 1996
- Mezorhizoglyphus colchicus Kadzhaya, 1966
