= Paraforcellinia =

Scientific classification
- Kingdom: Animalia
- Phylum: Arthropoda
- Subphylum: Chelicerata
- Class: Arachnida
- Order: Sarcoptiformes
- Family: Acaridae
- Genus: Paraforcellinia; Kadzhaya, 1974

Genus of mites

Paraforcellinia is a genus of mites in the family Acaridae.

== Species ==
- Paraforcellinia saljanica Kadzhaya, 1974
