= Apiacarus =

Scientific classification
- Kingdom: Animalia
- Phylum: Arthropoda
- Subphylum: Chelicerata
- Class: Arachnida
- Order: Sarcoptiformes
- Family: Acaridae
- Genus: Apiacarus; Volgin, 1974

Genus of mites

Apiacarus is a genus of mites in the family Acaridae.

== Species ==
- Apiacarus inflatus Volgin, 1974
