= Naiadacarus =

Scientific classification
- Kingdom: Animalia
- Phylum: Arthropoda
- Subphylum: Chelicerata
- Class: Arachnida
- Order: Sarcoptiformes
- Family: Acaridae
- Genus: Naiadacarus; Fashing, 1974

Genus of mites

Naiadacarus is a genus of mites in the family Acaridae.

== Species ==
- Fagacarus arboricola Fashing, 1974
- Fagacarus fashingi O'Connor, 1989
- Fagacarus mydophilus O'Connor, 1989
- Fagacarus nepenthicola Fashing & Chua, 2002
