= Ctenocolletacarus =

Scientific classification
- Kingdom: Animalia
- Phylum: Arthropoda
- Subphylum: Chelicerata
- Class: Arachnida
- Order: Sarcoptiformes
- Family: Acaridae
- Genus: Ctenocolletacarus; Fain, 1984

Genus of mites

Ctenocolletacarus is a genus of mites in the family Acaridae.

== Species ==
- Ctenocolletacarus brevirostris Fain, 1984
- Ctenocolletacarus grandior Fain, 1984
- Ctenocolletacarus longirostris Fain, 1984
