= Pinoglyphus =

Scientific classification
- Kingdom: Animalia
- Phylum: Arthropoda
- Subphylum: Chelicerata
- Class: Arachnida
- Order: Sarcoptiformes
- Family: Acaridae
- Genus: Pinoglyphus; S. Mahunka, 1978

Genus of mites

Pinoglyphus is a genus of mites in the family Acaridae.

== Species ==
- Pinoglyphus cetus Mahunka, 1979
- Pinoglyphus pilosus Mahunka, 1979
- Pinoglyphus rettenmeyeri S. Mahunka, 1978
