= Rodionovia =

Scientific classification
- Kingdom: Animalia
- Phylum: Arthropoda
- Subphylum: Chelicerata
- Class: Arachnida
- Order: Sarcoptiformes
- Family: Acaridae
- Genus: Rodionovia; Zachvatkin, 1941

Genus of mites

Rodionovia is a genus of mites in the family Acaridae.

== Species ==
- Rodionovia helenae (Sevastianov & Tamam-Nasem-Marros, 1993)
