= Psyllacarus =

Scientific classification
- Kingdom: Animalia
- Phylum: Arthropoda
- Subphylum: Chelicerata
- Class: Arachnida
- Order: Sarcoptiformes
- Family: Acaridae
- Genus: Psyllacarus; Fain, F. Bartholomaeus, B. Cooke & J. C. Beaucournu, 1990

Genus of mites

Psyllacarus is a genus of mites in the family Acaridae.

== Species ==
- Psyllacarus subellipticus Fain, F. Bartholomaeus, B. Cooke & J. C. Beaucournu, 1990
