= Lindquistia =

Scientific classification
- Domain: Eukaryota
- Kingdom: Animalia
- Phylum: Arthropoda
- Subphylum: Chelicerata
- Class: Arachnida
- Order: Sarcoptiformes
- Family: Acaridae
- Genus: Lindquistia; Mahunka, 1977

Genus of mites

Lindquistia is a genus of mites in the family Acaridae.

== Species ==
- Lindquistia bolitotheri Mahunka, 1977
