= Paulacarellus =

Scientific classification
- Kingdom: Animalia
- Phylum: Arthropoda
- Subphylum: Chelicerata
- Class: Arachnida
- Order: Sarcoptiformes
- Family: Acaridae
- Genus: Paulacarellus; Fain, 1976

Genus of mites

Paulacarellus is a genus of mites in the family Acaridae.

== Species ==
- Paulacarellus faini Klimov, 2001
- Paulacarellus insularis Fain, 1976
