= Bembidioglyphus =

Scientific classification
- Kingdom: Animalia
- Phylum: Arthropoda
- Subphylum: Chelicerata
- Class: Arachnida
- Order: Sarcoptiformes
- Family: Acaridae
- Genus: Bembidioglyphus; Klimov, 1998

Genus of mites

Bembidioglyphus is a genus of mites in the family Acaridae.

== Species ==
- Bembidioglyphus acinacisetosus Klimov, 1998
