= Hoogstraalacarus =

Scientific classification
- Kingdom: Animalia
- Phylum: Arthropoda
- Subphylum: Chelicerata
- Class: Arachnida
- Order: Sarcoptiformes
- Family: Acaridae
- Genus: Hoogstraalacarus; Yunker, 1970

Genus of mites

Hoogstraalacarus is a genus of mites in the family Acaridae.

== Species ==
- Hoogstraalacarus tiwiensis Yunker, 1970
