= Fainoglyphus =

Scientific classification
- Kingdom: Animalia
- Phylum: Arthropoda
- Subphylum: Chelicerata
- Class: Arachnida
- Order: Sarcoptiformes
- Family: Acaridae
- Genus: Fainoglyphus; S. Mahunka, 1979

Genus of mites

Fainoglyphus is a genus of mites in the family Acaridae.

== Species ==
- Fainoglyphus magnasternus Atyeo & Gaud, 1977
- Fainoglyphus ornatus S. Mahunka, 1979
