= Mahunkallinia =

Scientific classification
- Kingdom: Animalia
- Phylum: Arthropoda
- Subphylum: Chelicerata
- Class: Arachnida
- Order: Sarcoptiformes
- Family: Acaridae
- Genus: Mahunkallinia; Eraky, 1999

Genus of mites

Mahunkallinia is a genus of mites in the family Acaridae.

== Species ==
- Mahunkallinia serratus Eraky, 1999
