= Tyroglyphites =

Scientific classification
- Kingdom: Animalia
- Phylum: Arthropoda
- Subphylum: Chelicerata
- Class: Arachnida
- Order: Sarcoptiformes
- Family: Acaridae
- Genus: Tyroglyphites; Pampaloni, 1902

Genus of mites

Tyroglyphites is a genus of mites in the family Acaridae.

== Species ==
- Tyroglyphites miocenicus Pampaloni, 1902
