= Pelzneria =

Scientific classification
- Kingdom: Animalia
- Phylum: Arthropoda
- Subphylum: Chelicerata
- Class: Arachnida
- Order: Sarcoptiformes
- Family: Acaridae
- Genus: Pelzneria; Scheucher, in Stammer 1957

Genus of mites

Pelzneria is a genus of mites in the family Acaridae. Species of Pelzneria are most often associated with small vertebrate carrion, and most species are phoretic on silphid beetles of the genus Nicrophorus.

== Species ==
- Pelzneria afluctuosa Mahunka, 1978
- Pelzneria crenulatus (Oudemans, 1909)
- Pelzneria meyerae Mahunka, 1979
