= Caloglyphus =

Scientific classification
- Kingdom: Animalia
- Phylum: Arthropoda
- Subphylum: Chelicerata
- Class: Arachnida
- Order: Sarcoptiformes
- Family: Acaridae
- Genus: Caloglyphus; Berlese, 1923

Genus of mites

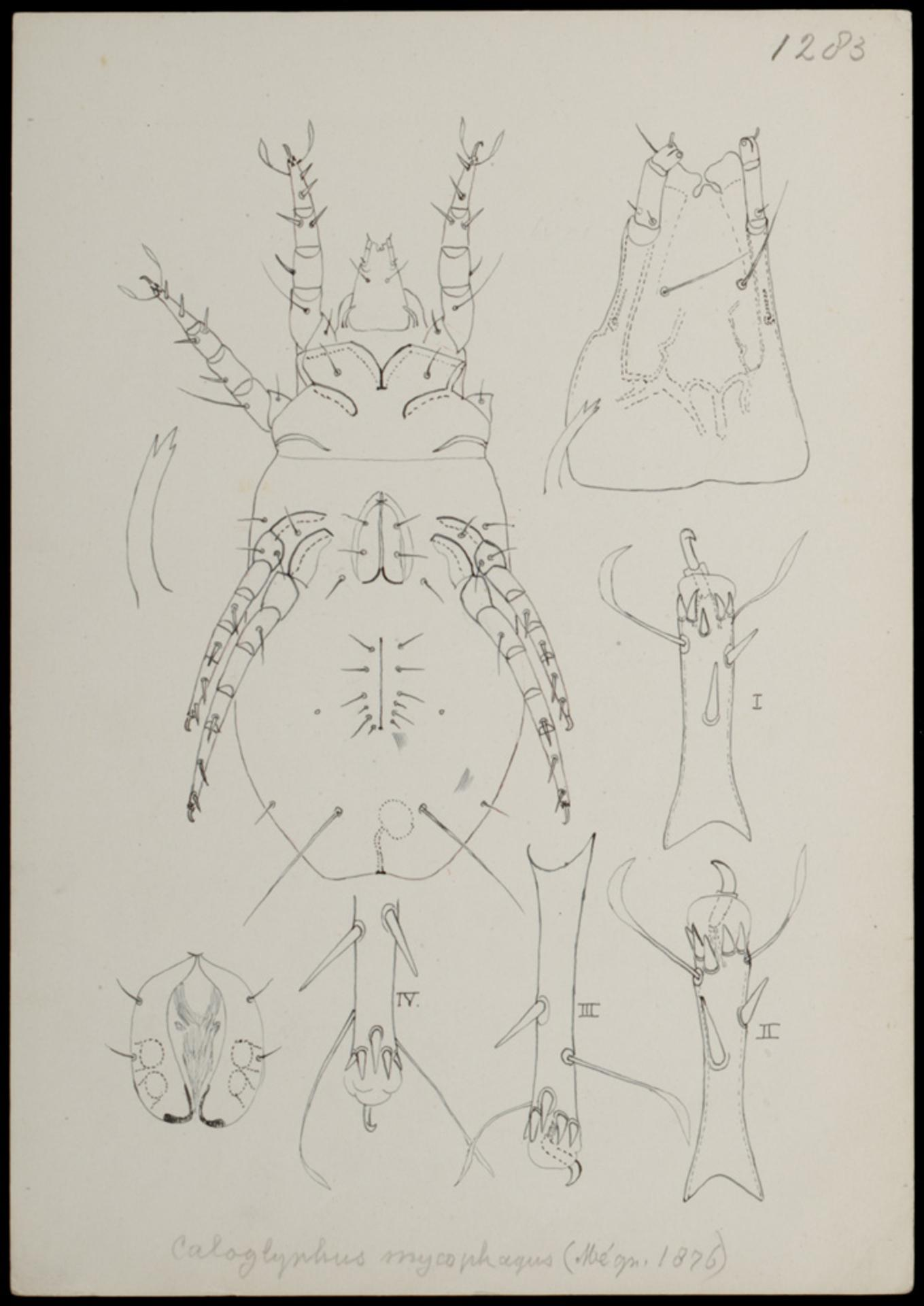
Caloglyphus mycophagus (Megnin), Anthonie Cornelis Oudemans

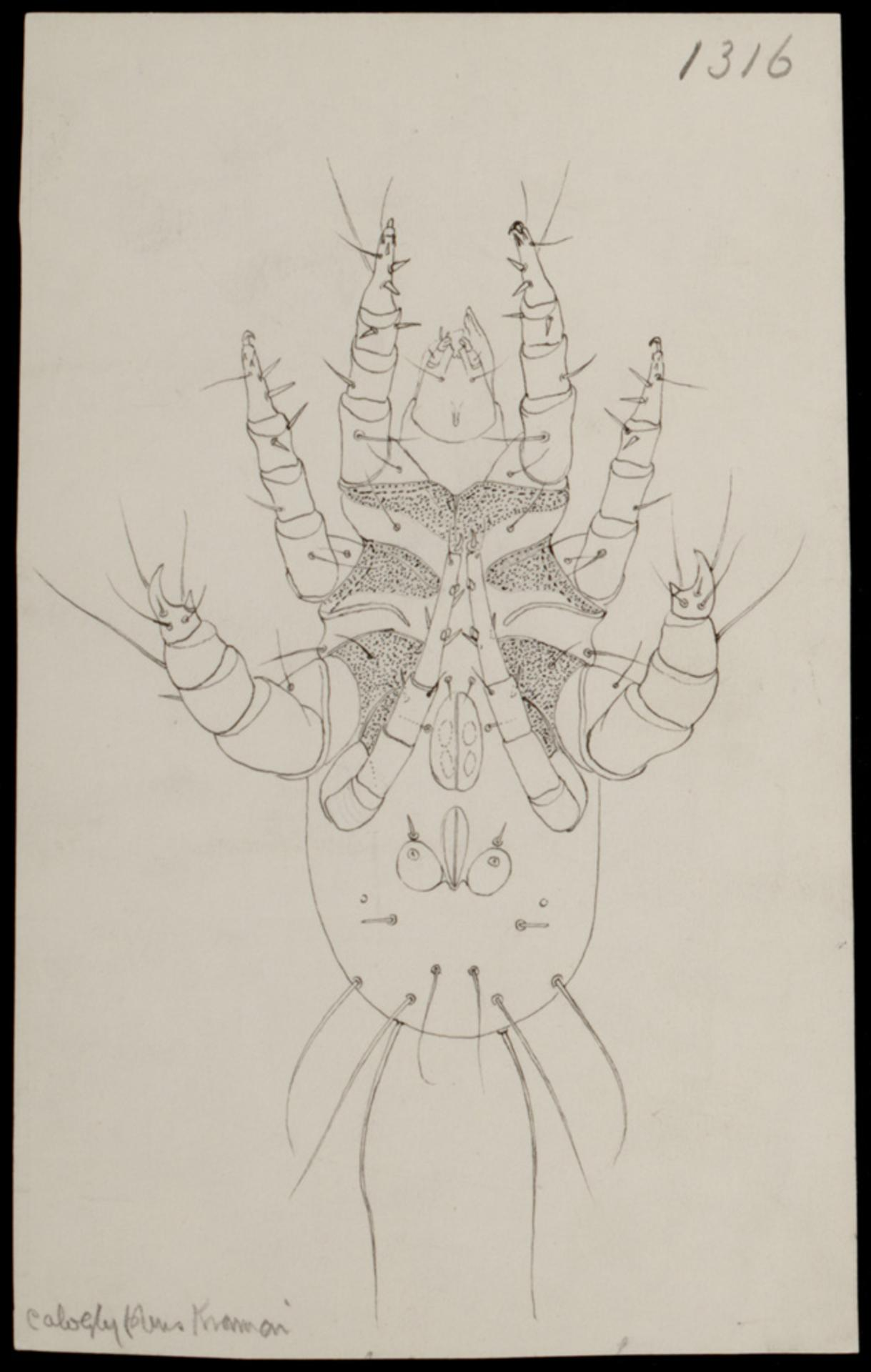
Caloglyphus krameri (Berlese), Anthonie Cornelis Oudemans

Caloglyphus is a genus of mites in the family Acaridae.

== Species ==
- Caloglyphus argillaceus Sevastianov & Tamam-Nasem-Marros, 1993
- Caloglyphus armatus Mahunka, 1979
- Caloglyphus baloghi Mahunka, 1978
- Caloglyphus berlesei (Michael, 1903)
- Caloglyphus capitatus Mahunka, 1979
- Caloglyphus caroli Channabasavanna & Krishna Rao, in Channabasavanna, Krishna-Rao & Rangnath 1982
- Caloglyphus conus Mahunka, 1978
- Caloglyphus csibbii Eraky, 1999
- Caloglyphus dorylini Mahunka, 1979
- Caloglyphus fimetarius Sevastianov & Tamam-Nasem-Marros, 1993
- Caloglyphus forficularis Sevastianov & Hag H. Rady, in Sevastyanov & Ged-Khamada-Khassan-Kh-Rad 1991
- Caloglyphus fujianensis Zou, Wang & Chang, 1987
- Caloglyphus karnatakaensis Krishna Rao & Ranganath, in Krishna-Rao, Ranganath & Channabasavanna 1982
- Caloglyphus kendae Sevastianov & Tamam-Nasem-Marros, 1993
- Caloglyphus kunshanensis Zou-Ping & Wang-Xiaoz, 1991
- Caloglyphus lamermanni (Berlese, 1923)
- Caloglyphus mandzhur Zakhvatkin
- Caloglyphus moniezi Zakhvatkin
- Caloglyphus muscarius Sevastianov & Gad H. Rady, in Sevastyanov & Ged-Khamada-Khassan-Kh-Rad 1991
- Caloglyphus mycophagus (Mégnin)
- Caloglyphus pergandis (Berlese, 1920)
- Caloglyphus phyllagnathae Chinniah & Mohanasundaram, 1996
- Caloglyphus radyi Sevastianov & Gad H. Rady, in Sevastyanov & Ged-Khamada-Khassan-Kh-Rad 1991
- Caloglyphus rodriguezi Samsinak, 1980
- Caloglyphus sphaerogaster Zakhvatkin, 1937
- Caloglyphus striatus Klimov, 1996
- Caloglyphus subalaris Sevastianov & Tamam-Nasem-Marros, 1993
- Caloglyphus vitzthumi Mahunka, 1979
