= Ewingia =

Scientific classification
- Kingdom: Animalia
- Phylum: Arthropoda
- Subphylum: Chelicerata
- Class: Arachnida
- Order: Sarcoptiformes
- Family: Acaridae
- Genus: Ewingia; Pearse, 1929

Genus of mites

Ewingia is a genus of mites in the family Acaridae.

== Species ==
- Ewingia cenobitae Pearse, 1929
- Ewingia potamona Kaneko & Kadosaka, 1978
