= Kuzinia =

Scientific classification
- Kingdom: Animalia
- Phylum: Arthropoda
- Subphylum: Chelicerata
- Class: Arachnida
- Order: Sarcoptiformes
- Family: Acaridae
- Genus: Kuzinia; Zachvatkin, 1941

Genus of mites

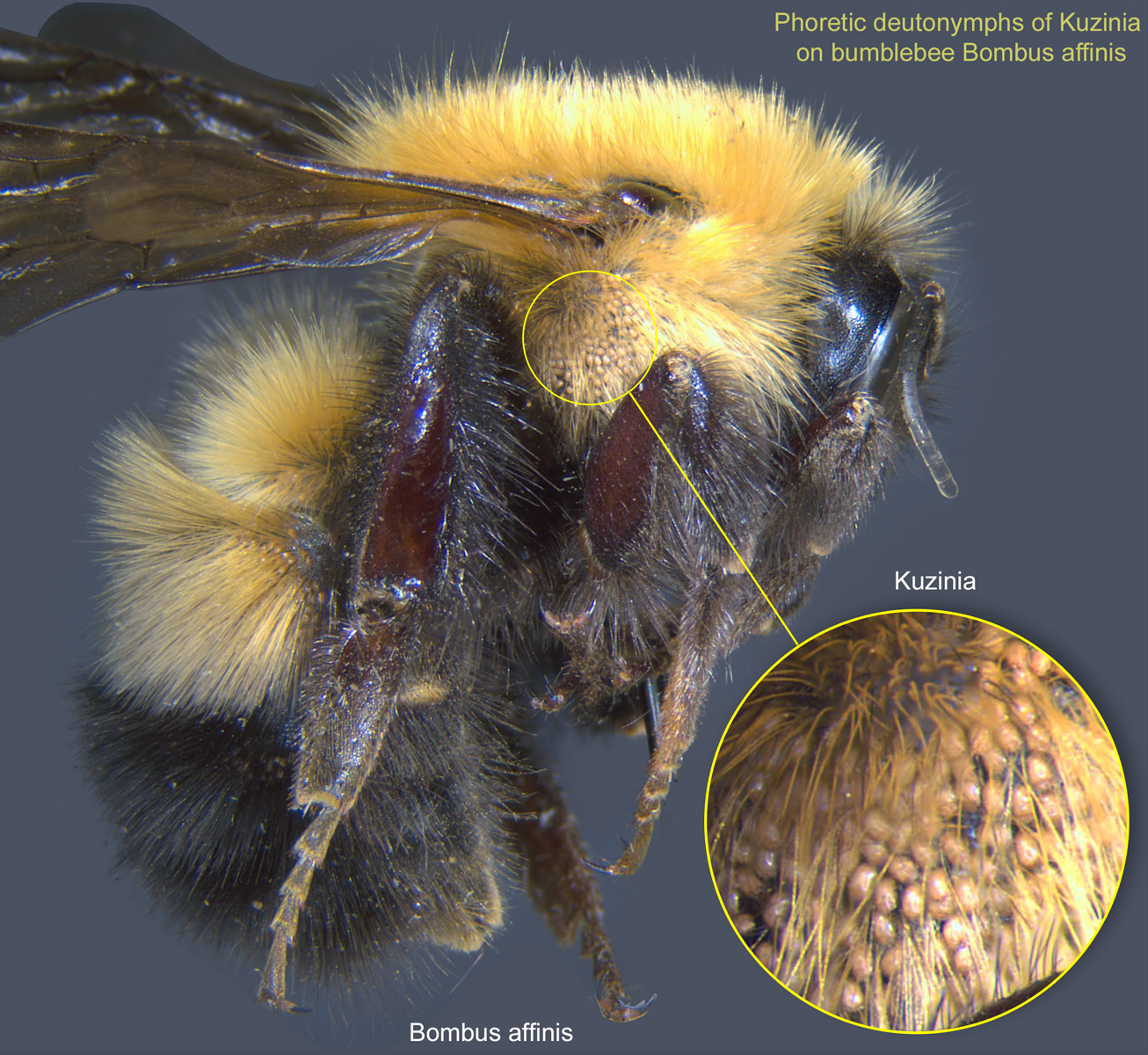
Phoretic deutonymphs of bee mite genus Kuzinia on bumblebee Bombus affinis.

Kuzinia is a genus of mites in the family Acaridae.

== Species ==
- Kuzinia evae Putatunda, Aggarwal & Kapil, 1984
- Kuzinia morsei (El-Banhawy & Abou-Awad, 1990)
- Kuzinia sciurina Volgin, 1978
- Kuzinia woykei Putatunda, Aggarwal & Kapil, 1984
- Kuzinia laevis (Dujardin, 1849)
