= Hortacarus =

Scientific classification
- Kingdom: Animalia
- Phylum: Arthropoda
- Subphylum: Chelicerata
- Class: Arachnida
- Order: Sarcoptiformes
- Family: Acaridae
- Genus: Hortacarus; S. Mahunka, 1979

Genus of mites

Hortacarus is a genus of mites in the family Acaridae.

== Species ==
- Hortacarus simplisetosus S. Mahunka, 1979
