= Neotropacarus =

Scientific classification
- Kingdom: Animalia
- Phylum: Arthropoda
- Subphylum: Chelicerata
- Class: Arachnida
- Order: Sarcoptiformes
- Family: Acaridae
- Genus: Neotropacarus; Baker, 1985

Genus of mites

Neotropacarus is a genus of mites in the family Acaridae.

== Species ==
- Neotropacarus bakeri (Collyer, 1967)
- Neotropacarus excavatus (Niedbala, 1981)
- Neotropacarus mumai (Cunliffe, 1964)
