= Sinolardoglyphus =

Scientific classification
- Kingdom: Animalia
- Phylum: Arthropoda
- Subphylum: Chelicerata
- Class: Arachnida
- Order: Sarcoptiformes
- Family: Acaridae
- Genus: Sinolardoglyphus; Z. T. Jiang, 1991

Genus of mites

Sinolardoglyphus is a genus of mites in the family Acaridae.

== Species ==
- Sinolardoglyphus nanchangensis Z. T. Jiang, 1991
