= Umakefeq =

Scientific classification
- Kingdom: Animalia
- Phylum: Arthropoda
- Subphylum: Chelicerata
- Class: Arachnida
- Order: Sarcoptiformes
- Family: Acaridae
- Genus: Umakefeq; Klimov, 2000

Genus of mites

Umakefeq is a genus of mites in the family Acaridae.

== Species ==
- Umakefeq macroophtalmus Klimov, 2000
- Umakefeq mesoophtalmus Klimov, 2000
- Umakefeq microophtalmus Klimov, 2000
