= Megachilopus =

Scientific classification
- Kingdom: Animalia
- Phylum: Arthropoda
- Subphylum: Chelicerata
- Class: Arachnida
- Order: Sarcoptiformes
- Family: Acaridae
- Genus: Megachilopus; Fain, 1974

Genus of mites

Megachilopus is a genus of mites in the family Acaridae.

== Species ==
- Megachilopus uellensis Fain, 1974
