= Naiacus =

Scientific classification
- Kingdom: Animalia
- Phylum: Arthropoda
- Subphylum: Chelicerata
- Class: Arachnida
- Order: Sarcoptiformes
- Family: Acaridae
- Genus: Naiacus; H.H.J. Nesbitt, 1990

Genus of mites

Naiacus is a genus of mites in the family Acaridae.

== Species ==
- Naiacus muertensis H.H.J. Nesbitt, 1990
