= Kanekobia =

Scientific classification
- Kingdom: Animalia
- Phylum: Arthropoda
- Subphylum: Chelicerata
- Class: Arachnida
- Order: Sarcoptiformes
- Family: Acaridae
- Genus: Kanekobia; Fain, C. E. Yunker, J. van Goethem & D. E. Johnston, 1982

Genus of mites

Kanekobia is a genus of mites in the family Acaridae.

== Species ==
- Kanekobia potamona (Kaneko & Kadosaka, 1978)
