= Scatoglyphus =

Scientific classification
- Kingdom: Animalia
- Phylum: Arthropoda
- Subphylum: Chelicerata
- Class: Arachnida
- Order: Sarcoptiformes
- Family: Acaridae
- Genus: Scatoglyphus; Berlese, 1913

Genus of mites

Scatoglyphus is a genus of mites in the family Acaridae.

== Species ==
- Scatoglyphus polytrematus Berlese, 1913
