= Carabidobius =

Scientific classification
- Kingdom: Animalia
- Phylum: Arthropoda
- Subphylum: Chelicerata
- Class: Arachnida
- Order: Sarcoptiformes
- Family: Acaridae
- Genus: Carabidobius; Volgin, 1953

Genus of mites

Carabidobius is a genus of mites in the family Acaridae.

== Species ==
- Carabidobius bartheli (Turk & Turk, 1957)
- Carabidobius bifurcatus (Mahunka, 1973)
- Carabidobius radiatus Volgin, 1953
- Carabidobius regleri (Turk & Turk, 1957)
