= Dynastopus =

Scientific classification
- Kingdom: Animalia
- Phylum: Arthropoda
- Subphylum: Chelicerata
- Class: Arachnida
- Order: Sarcoptiformes
- Family: Acaridae
- Genus: Dynastopus; Fain, 1978

Genus of mites

Dynastopus is a genus of mites in the family Acaridae.

== Species ==
- Dynastopus camerikae Fain, 1978
- Dynastopus augosomae Fain, 1978
- Dynastopus tshuapensis Fain, 1978
