= Notiopsyllopus =

Scientific classification
- Kingdom: Animalia
- Phylum: Arthropoda
- Subphylum: Chelicerata
- Class: Arachnida
- Order: Sarcoptiformes
- Family: Acaridae
- Genus: Notiopsyllopus; Fain, 1977

Genus of mites

Notiopsyllopus is a genus of mites in the family Acaridae.

== Species ==
- Notiopsyllopus segermanae Fain, 1977
