= Calvoliella =

Scientific classification
- Kingdom: Animalia
- Phylum: Arthropoda
- Subphylum: Chelicerata
- Class: Arachnida
- Order: Sarcoptiformes
- Family: Acaridae
- Genus: Calvoliella; Samsinak, 1969

Genus of mites

Calvoliella is a genus of mites in the family Acaridae.

== Species ==
- Calvoliella laphriae (Samsinak, 1956)
- Calvoliella pocsi Samsinak, 1969
