= Konoglyphus =

Scientific classification
- Domain: Eukaryota
- Kingdom: Animalia
- Phylum: Arthropoda
- Subphylum: Chelicerata
- Class: Arachnida
- Order: Sarcoptiformes
- Family: Acaridae
- Genus: Konoglyphus; Delfinado & Baker, 1974

Genus of mites

Konoglyphus is a genus of mites in the family Acaridae.

== Species ==
- Konoglyphus mexicanus Delfinado & Baker, 1974
