= Capillaroglyphus =

Scientific classification
- Kingdom: Animalia
- Phylum: Arthropoda
- Subphylum: Chelicerata
- Class: Arachnida
- Order: Sarcoptiformes
- Family: Acaridae
- Genus: Capillaroglyphus; Klimov, 1998

Genus of mites

Capillaroglyphus is a genus of mites in the family Acaridae.

== Species ==
- Capillaroglyphus polypori Klimov, 1998
