= Acarotalpa =

Scientific classification
- Kingdom: Animalia
- Phylum: Arthropoda
- Subphylum: Chelicerata
- Class: Arachnida
- Order: Sarcoptiformes
- Family: Acaridae
- Genus: Acarotalpa; Volgin, 1966

Genus of mites

Acarotalpa is a genus of mites in the family Acaridae.

== Species ==
- Acarotalpa duprei Fain, 1987
- Acarotalpa fossor Volgin, 1966
