= Askinasia =

Scientific classification
- Kingdom: Animalia
- Phylum: Arthropoda
- Subphylum: Chelicerata
- Class: Arachnida
- Order: Sarcoptiformes
- Family: Acaridae
- Genus: Askinasia; Yunker, 1970

Genus of mites

Askinasia is a genus of mites in the family Acaridae.

== Species ==
- Askinasia aethiopicus Yunker, 1970
- Askinasia antillarum Fain, Yunker, van-Goethem & Johnston, 1982
