= Setoglyphus =

Scientific classification
- Kingdom: Animalia
- Phylum: Arthropoda
- Subphylum: Chelicerata
- Class: Arachnida
- Order: Sarcoptiformes
- Family: Acaridae
- Genus: Setoglyphus; S. Mahunka, 1979

Genus of mites

Setoglyphus is a genus of mites in the family Acaridae.

== Species ==
- Setoglyphus hexaedra (Mahunka, 1973)
- Setoglyphus variosetosus S. Mahunka, 1979
