= Boletoglyphus =

Scientific classification
- Kingdom: Animalia
- Phylum: Arthropoda
- Subphylum: Chelicerata
- Class: Arachnida
- Order: Sarcoptiformes
- Family: Acaridae
- Genus: Boletoglyphus; Volgin, 1953

Genus of mites

Boletoglyphus is a genus of mites in the family Acaridae.

== Species ==
- Boletoglyphus cribrosus Volgin, 1953
- Boletoglyphus boletophagi (Türk, 1952)
- Boletoglyphus ornatus Fain & Ide, 1976
- Boletoglyphus extremiorientalis Klimov, 1998
