= Ghanacarus =

Scientific classification
- Kingdom: Animalia
- Phylum: Arthropoda
- Subphylum: Chelicerata
- Class: Arachnida
- Order: Sarcoptiformes
- Family: Acaridae
- Genus: Ghanacarus; Mahunka, 1973

Genus of mites

Ghanacarus is a genus of mites in the family Acaridae.

== Species ==
- Ghanacarus endroedii Mahunka, 1973
