= Troxocoptes =

Scientific classification
- Kingdom: Animalia
- Phylum: Arthropoda
- Subphylum: Chelicerata
- Class: Arachnida
- Order: Sarcoptiformes
- Family: Acaridae
- Genus: Troxocoptes; Fain & J. R. Philips, 1983

Genus of mites

Troxocoptes is a genus of mites in the family Acaridae.

== Species ==
- Troxocoptes minutus Fain & J. R. Philips, 1983
