= Amphicalvolia =

Scientific classification
- Kingdom: Animalia
- Phylum: Arthropoda
- Subphylum: Chelicerata
- Class: Arachnida
- Order: Sarcoptiformes
- Family: Acaridae
- Genus: Amphicalvolia; Türk, 1963

Genus of mites

Amphicalvolia is a genus of mites in the family Acaridae.

== Species ==
- Amphicalvolia hurdi Türk, 1963
