= Halictacarus =

Scientific classification
- Kingdom: Animalia
- Phylum: Arthropoda
- Subphylum: Chelicerata
- Class: Arachnida
- Order: Sarcoptiformes
- Family: Acaridae
- Genus: Halictacarus; Mahunka, 1975

Genus of mites

Halictacarus is a genus of mites in the family Acaridae.

== Species ==
- Halictacarus halicti Mahunka, 1975
