= Horstiella =

Scientific classification
- Kingdom: Animalia
- Phylum: Arthropoda
- Subphylum: Chelicerata
- Class: Arachnida
- Order: Sarcoptiformes
- Family: Acaridae
- Genus: Horstiella; Türk, 1949

Genus of mites

Horstiella is a genus of mites in the family Acaridae.

== Species ==
- Horstiella armata Türk, 1949
- Horstiella concentrica Ochoa & O'Connor, 2000
- Horstiella megamyzidos Ochoa & O'Connor, 2000
- Horstiella mourei Ochoa & O'Connor, 2000
- Horstiella quadrata Ochoa & O'Connor, 2000
- Horstiella snellingi Ochoa & O'Connor, 2000
- Horstiella variabilis Ochoa & O'Connor, 2000
