= Froriepia subpinnata =

Froriepia

Scientific classification
- Kingdom: Plantae
- Clade: Tracheophytes
- Clade: Angiosperms
- Clade: Eudicots
- Clade: Asterids
- Order: Apiales
- Family: Apiaceae
- Genus: Froriepia; K.Koch (1842)
- Species: F. subpinnata

Binomial name
- Froriepia subpinnata (Ledeb.) Baill. (1879)

Synonyms
- Bupleurum subpinnatum Ledeb. (1831); Froriepia nuda K.Koch (1842)

Species of flowering plant

Froriepia is a genus of flowering plants in the umbellifer family Apiaceae. It contains a single species, Froriepa subpinnata, a biennial native to the Caucasus region, including southern Russia, Georgia, Armenia, Azerbaijan, and northern Iran.

Froriepa subpinnata prefers to live in scrubby areas, in meadows, and on forest edges.

The genus name of Froriepia is in honour of Ludwig Friedrich von Froriep (1779–1847), a German doctor, professor of medicine and anatomy in Jena and Halle. It was first described and published in Linnaea Vol.16 on page 362 in 1842.
