= Psylloglyphus =

Scientific classification
- Kingdom: Animalia
- Phylum: Arthropoda
- Subphylum: Chelicerata
- Class: Arachnida
- Order: Oribatida
- Family: Winterschmidtiidae
- Genus: Psylloglyphus; Fain, 1966

Genus of mites in the family Acaridae

Psylloglyphus is a genus of mites in the family Winterschmidtiidae.

== Description ==
Psylloglyphus can be distinguished from related genera by the prodorsal shield lacking ocelli and the spermathecal duct being long with 5-6 loops.

== Ecology ==
Mites of these genus are phoretic on fleas. They have been collected from under the abdominal sclerites of fleas. They are more common on female fleas than males and the association is quite species-specific. They have also been found in the nests of seabirds where the fleas were present.

== Species ==
- Psylloglyphus australiensis Fain, Bartholomaeus, Cooke & Beaucournu, 1990
- Psylloglyphus chiliensis Fain & Beaucournu, 1989
- Psylloglyphus crenulatus Fain & Beaucournu, 1984
- Psylloglyphus foveolatus Fain & Mason, 1989
- Psylloglyphus hemimerus Fain & Beaucournu, 1976
- Psylloglyphus micronychus Fain & Beaucournu, 1986
- Psylloglyphus parapsyllus Fain & Galloway, 1993
- Psylloglyphus uilenbergi Fain, 1966
