= Froriepia (mite) =

Scientific classification
- Kingdom: Animalia
- Phylum: Arthropoda
- Subphylum: Chelicerata
- Class: Arachnida
- Order: Sarcoptiformes
- Family: Acaridae
- Subfamily: Rhizoglyphinae
- Genus: Froriepia; Vitzthum, 1919

Genus of mites

Froriepia is a genus of mites in the family Acaridae.

== Species ==
- Froriepia vimariensis Vitzthum, 1919
- Froriepia heterotricha Mahunka, 1978
- Froriepia negmi Eraky, 1999
