= Chicken meal =

Dry rendered meat product

Chicken meal is the dry rendered product from a combination of clean chicken flesh and skin with or without accompanying bone, derived from whole carcasses of chicken, exclusive of feathers, heads, feet and entrails. Meal here is used in the sense of "an ingredient which has been ground or otherwise reduced in particle size." It is mainly used in pet foods.

Chicken meal is ground up chicken meat that has been carefully dried to a moisture level of 10%. The protein content is 65% and the fat level is 12%. Regular chicken contains about 70% water with 18% protein and 5% fat. To create chicken meal, ingredients are placed into large vats and cooked. This rendering process not only separates fat and removes water to create a concentrated protein product, it also kills bacteria, viruses, parasites and other organisms. Because meat can be rid of infectious agents through the rendering process, “4D” animals (dead, dying, diseased or disabled) are allowable chicken meal ingredients. While not always present, the possible inclusion of these ingredients makes chicken meal always considered unfit for human consumption.

== Pet Food ==
Chicken meal is mainly used in pet foods. Its protein content is much higher than regular chicken because most of the water has been removed.

Typically when it comes to pet food, all of the ingredients (meats, grains, vitamins, minerals) are mixed together and put through a machine called an extruder. The extruder cooks the mixture by adding steam and water. The result is the familiar kibble coming out of the extruder and it is subsequently dried. Fat is added after drying. (This is the same process for making many breakfast cereals.) The final pet product has a moisture level of around 10%.

The processing of chicken meat along with the other ingredients essentially is converting it to chicken meal. However, there are some characteristics of regular chicken meat that make it less flexible for use as an ingredient compared to chicken meal. The high moisture content of chicken limits the amount that can be formulated into a complete finished food. Chicken is generally stored frozen to minimize microbial growth. The frozen chicken is thawed and made into slurry before adding to the mix.

Chicken meal, however, can be used in a finished food at levels much greater than chicken meat. Chicken meal in a finished food provides roughly 4 to 5 times the nutrients as the same weight of chicken meat because of the differences in moisture.

A pet food made of chicken meat may therefore have only 20% of the chicken in the final product, providing only 3.6% protein. An equivalent proportion of chicken meal would provide 13% protein.

(For example, 100 lbs of chicken meal provides 65 lbs of protein while 100 lbs of chicken provides only 18 lbs of protein.)
