= Aleksei Zachvatkin =

Russian entomologist and acarologist (1905–1950)

Aleksei Alekseevich Zachvatkin (Russian: Алексей Алексеевич Захваткин; until 1931 with the surname Jasykov or Yazykov; 1 December 1905 – 14 December 1950) was a Russian entomologist and acarologist who worked on leafhoppers and mites.

== Biography ==
Zachvatkin was born in a Russian noble family in Ekaterinburg and grew up in Montreux, Switzerland, educated by private tutors. The family moved to Moscow just before World War I and he went to study at the State University of Moscow. An interest in natural history led to work at the university herbarium and then at the zoological museum. He took an interest in the cicadas but the October revolution of 1917 and his wealthy background meant that he could not join university. He however attended some classes informally and studied painting. In 1926 he joined the Central Asian Institute of Plant Protection as an assistant and travelled on several expeditions. Among his discoveries were of hypermetamorphosis in the Meloidae and Bombyliidae. His last publication under the name of Jasykov was published in 1931. After being held hostage by counter-revolutionaries during an expedition and losing his identification papers, he took on the name of step-father and subsequently published under the name of Zachvatkin. He moved to the All Union Institute of Plant Protection, Leningrad and then moved in 1933 to the entomological laboratory of the State University of Moscow. He studied Tyroglyphidae (Acarina) and obtained a Ph.D. in 1935 and a Doctor of Biological Sciences in 1939. He then became a professor of entomology at Moscow. His work on mites led him to propose in 1952, based on the development of the fourth pair of legs, the classification of the Acarina into Acariformes, Parasitiformes, and Opiliocarina. He received the Stalin Prize twice but clashed with followers of Trofim Lysenko. His son Yuri A. Zachvatkin also became an entomologist.

== Selected works ==
His major books were Tyroglyphoid mites (Tyroglyphoidea) (1941) and Comparative embryology of lower invertebrates (1949). Some of his lectures and manuscripts were published posthumously in 1953 by his friends and students. A number of mite genera are named in his honour including Zachvatkinia Dubinin, 1949 and Zachvatkinella Lange, 1954.
