= Anthonie Cornelis Oudemans =

Dutch zoologist (1858–1943)

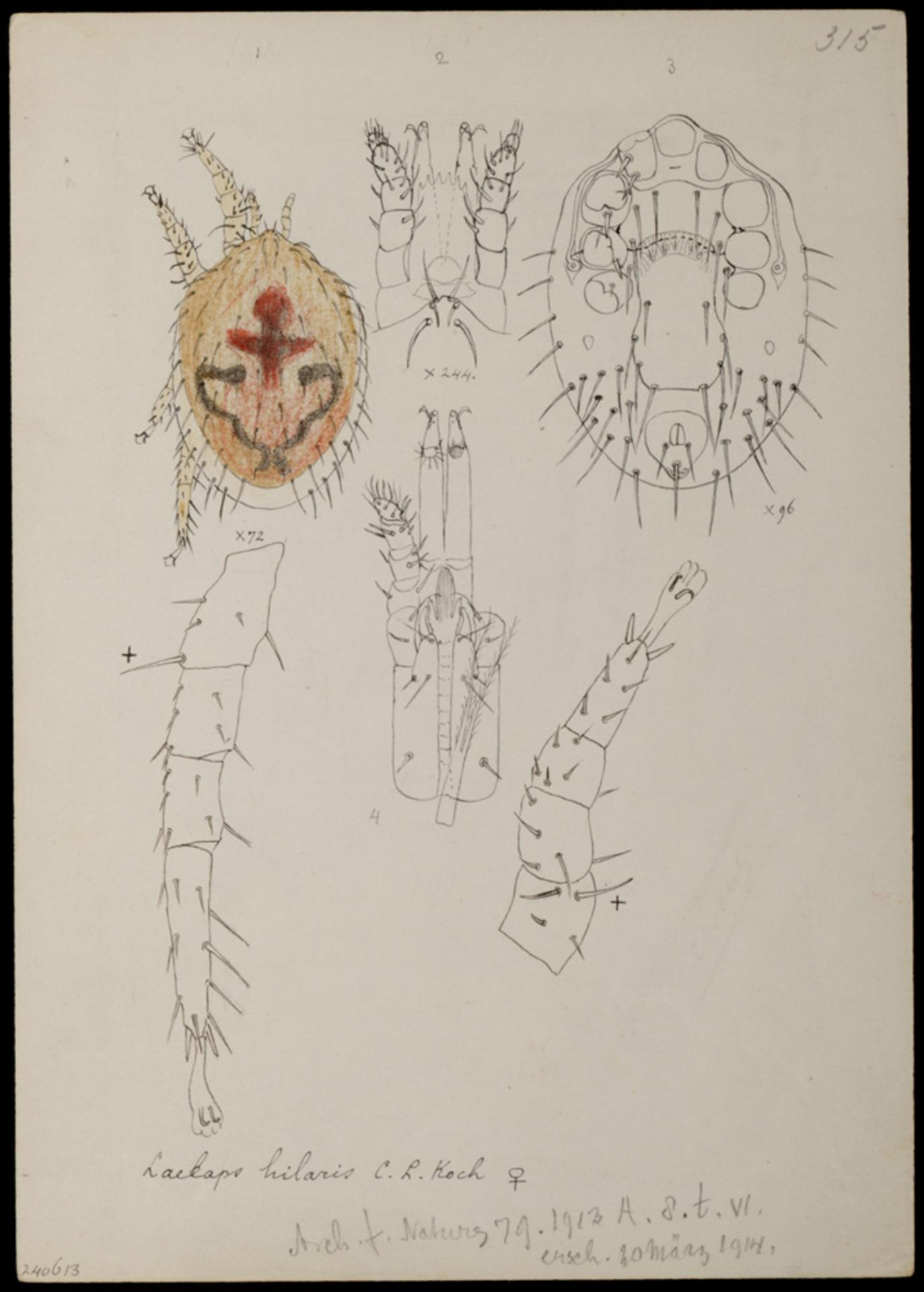
Female mite Laelaps hilaris C.L. Koch, 1836 by Oudemans. Oudemans Collection Naturalis.

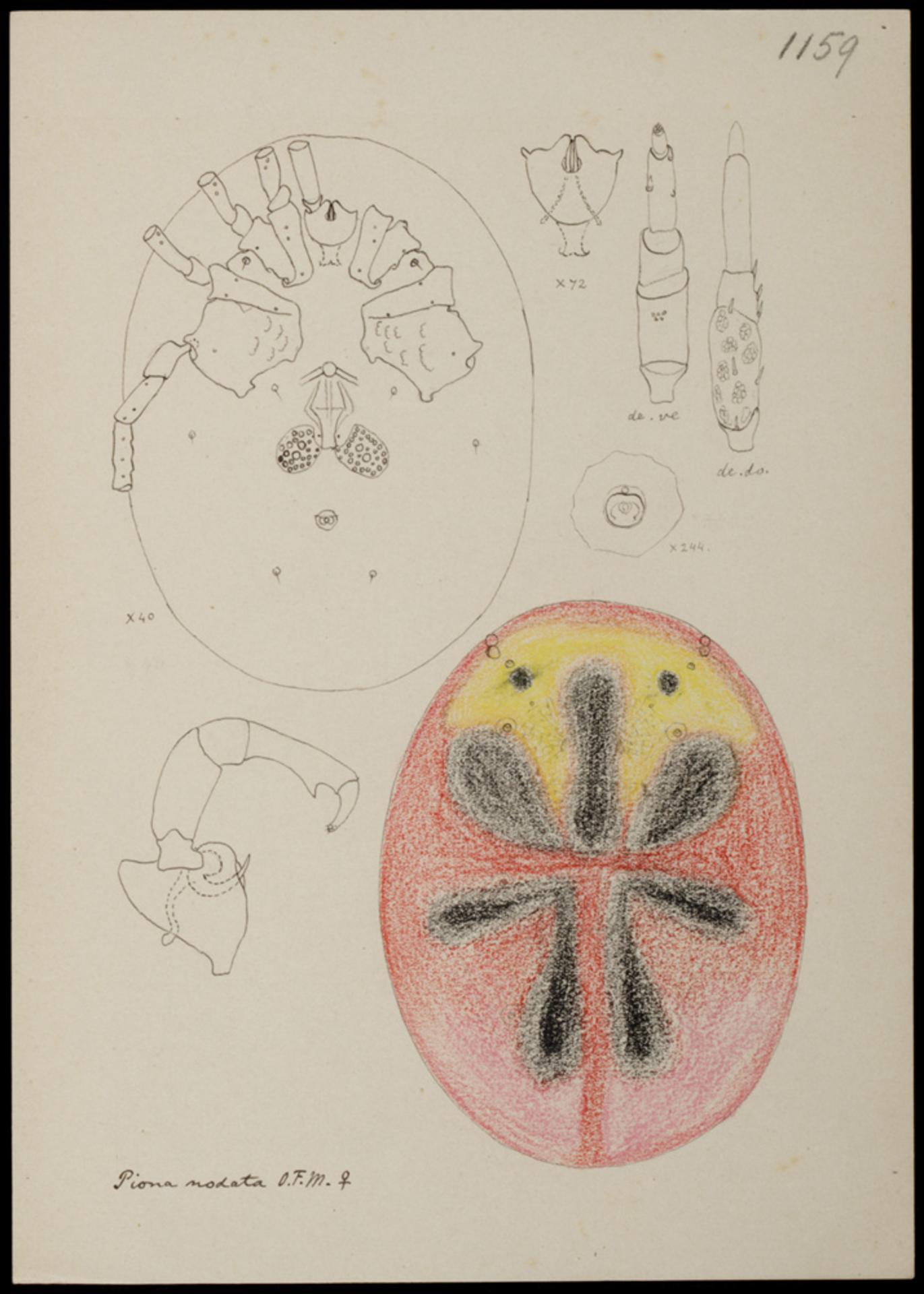
Female water mite Piona nodata (O.F. Müller, 1776). Oudemans Collection.

Anthonie (Antoon) Cornelis Oudemans Jzn (November 12, 1858 – January 14, 1943) was a Dutch zoologist. Although he was a specialist in acarology, the study of the ticks and mites, he was often best known for his books on sea monsters and the dodo.

Born in Batavia, Dutch East Indies, he was the son of the noted Dutch astronomer Jean Abraham Chrétien Oudemans and the grandson of the Dutch educator, poet and philologist Anthonie Cornelis Oudemans Sr., after whom he was named. He often used the patronymic "Jzn" (for Jeanzoon) in his publications. A cousin was the entomologist J.T. Oudemans. He was educated at Arnhem and went to the University of Utrecht. He wrote his dissertation on ribbon worms, and in 1885 was appointed director of the Royal Zoological Gardens at The Hague. Oudemans worked on the acari and comprehensively reviewed all literature until 1850 in a series of articles titled Kritisch historisch Overzicht der Acarologie. He described numerous species not only of acari and insects but even a primate species, the black crested mangabey.

1892 saw the publication of Oudeman's The Great Sea Serpent, a study of the many sea serpent reports from the world's oceans. Oudemans concluded that such creatures might be a previously unknown large seal, which he dubbed Megophias megophias. Reception of the volume has been described as respectful but "cold". Bernard Heuvelmans later suggested that The Great Sea Serpent was the root of cryptozoology.

In 1917, he published Dodo-studiën: naar aanleiding van de vondst van een gevelsteen met dodo-beeld van 1561 te Vere, an article on extinct dodo research.

In 1895, Oudemans left The Hague to teach biology in the Frisian city of Sneek. He published several scientific articles in later years. He had married Helena Johanna van de Velde in 1887, but became a widower, and remarried to Aletta Amelia Louise Pilgrim in 1919.

In 1942, he donated the Rijksmuseum van Natuurlijke Historie his important collection of mites (Acari). This collection numbers 5981 slides (1316 species). After his death, the accompanying drawings were bequeathed to the museum as well.

Oudemans died in Arnhem in 1943.

== See also ==
- Varroa (1904)
