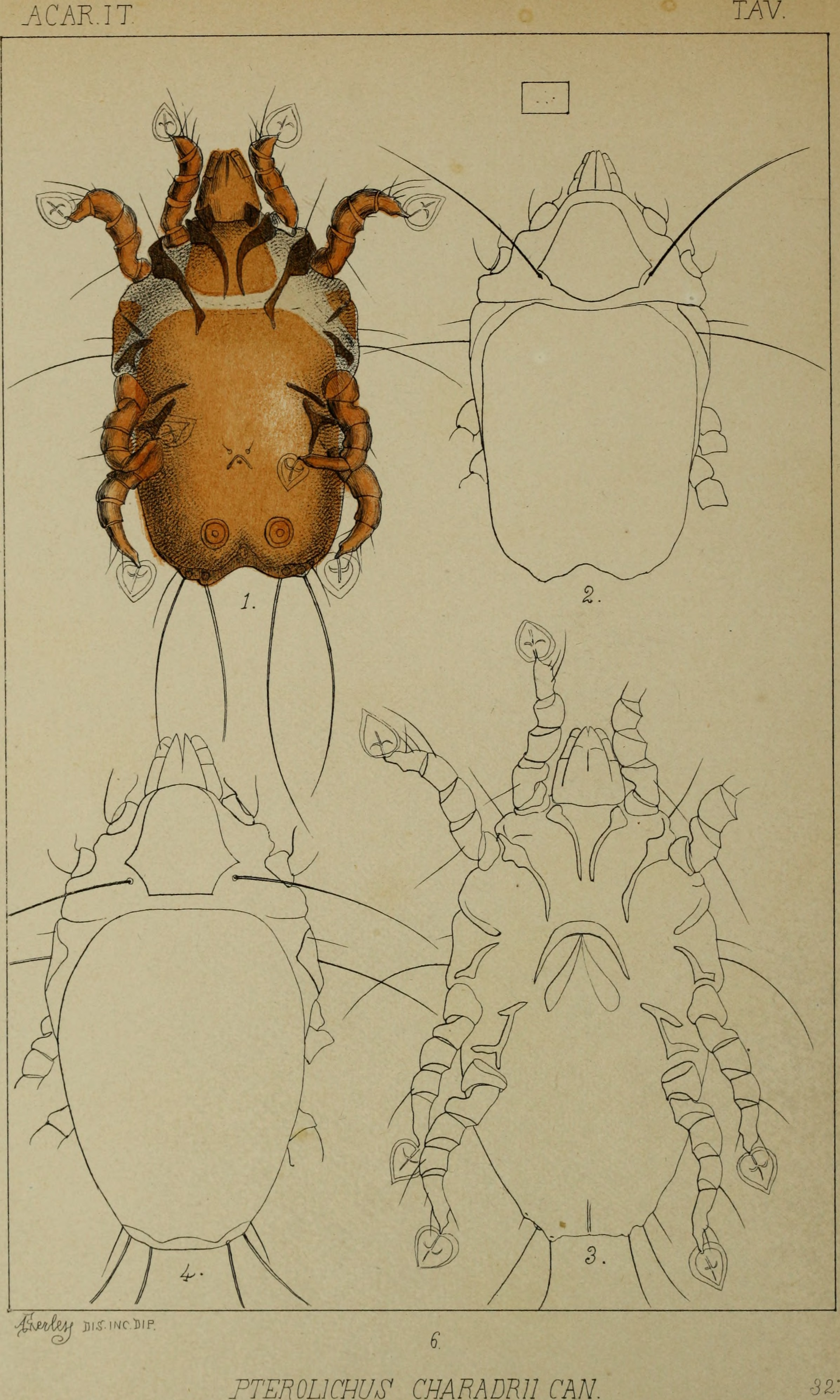
- Bychovskiata charadrii

Scientific classification
- Kingdom: Animalia
- Phylum: Arthropoda
- Subphylum: Chelicerata
- Class: Arachnida
- Order: Sarcoptiformes
- Superfamily: Analgoidea
- Family: Avenzoariidae

= Avenzoariidae =

Family of mites

Avenzoariidae is a family of feather mites in the order Astigmata. There are at least 15 genera in Avenzoariidae. They are found on the feathers of aquatic birds, and in the case of one species, birds of prey.

== Genera ==
These 15 genera belong to the family Avenzoariidae:

- Avenzoaria Oudemans, 1905
- Bdellorhynchus Megnin & Trouessart, 1884
- Bonnetella Trouessart, 1924
- Bregetovia Dubinin, 1951
- Bychovskiata Dubinin, 1951
- Capelloptes Dubinin, 1951
- Hemifreyana Gaud & Mouchet, 1959
- Laronyssus Dubinin, 1951
- Pomeranzevia Dubinin, 1951
- Pseudavenzoaria Dubinin, 1951
- Rafalskiata Mironov & Dabert, 1997
- Scutomegninia Dubinin, 1951
- Zachvatkinia Dubinin, 1949
- Zachvatkiniana Volgin, 1967
- Zygochelifer Atyeo, 1984

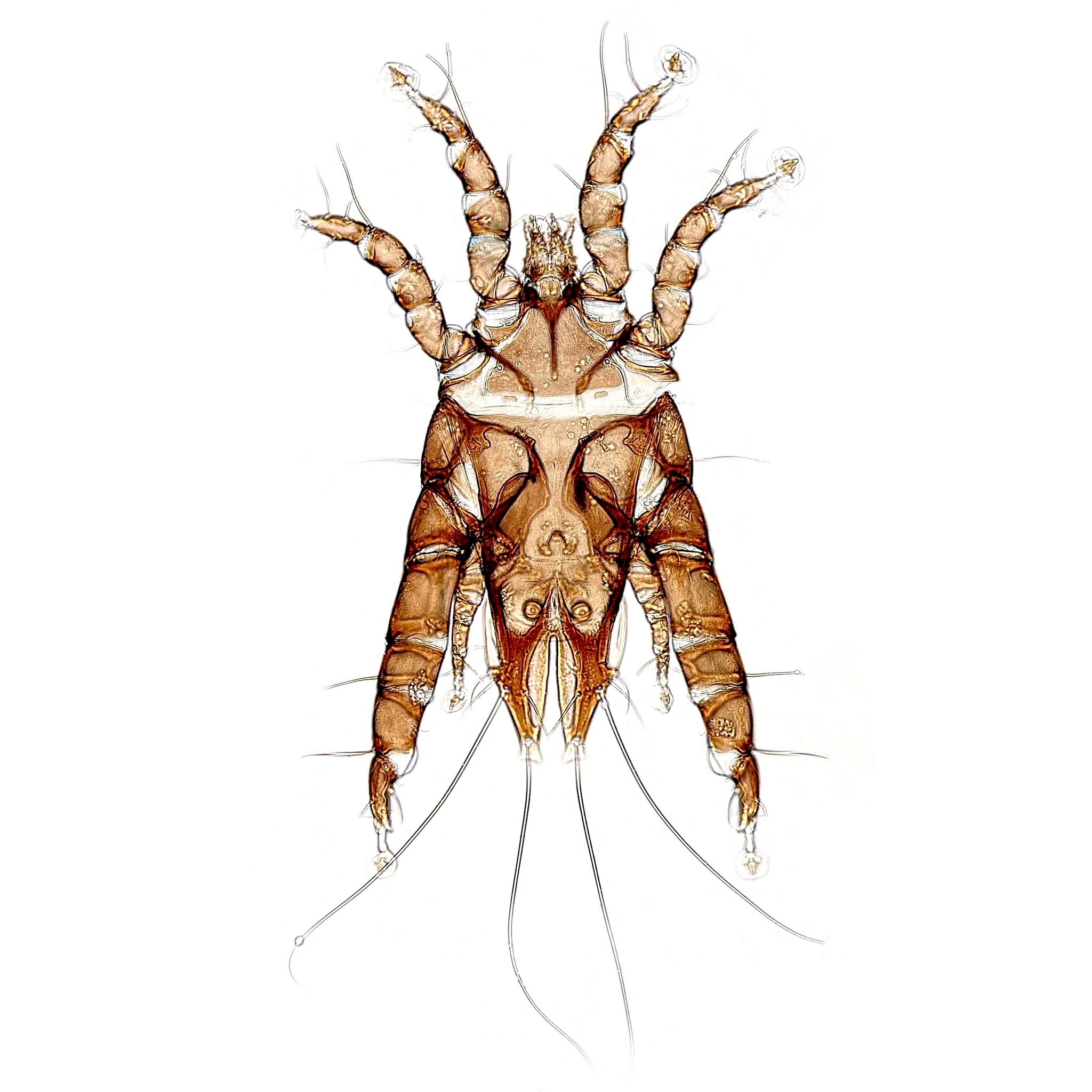
Zachvatkinia larica, Australia
