= Laminosioptes =

Scientific classification
- Kingdom: Animalia
- Phylum: Arthropoda
- Subphylum: Chelicerata
- Class: Arachnida
- Order: Sarcoptiformes
- Family: Laminosioptidae
- Genus: Laminosioptes; Mégnin, 1880

Genus of mites

Laminosioptes is a genus of mites belonging to the family Laminosioptidae.

Species:

- Laminosioptes cisticola (Vizioli, 1868)
- Laminosioptes collaris Fain, 1981
- Laminosioptes myiopsittae Fain, 1981
- Laminosioptes reticulata Fain, 1981
