= Laminosioptidae =

Scientific classification
- Kingdom: Animalia
- Phylum: Arthropoda
- Subphylum: Chelicerata
- Class: Arachnida
- Order: Sarcoptiformes
- Family: Laminosioptidae

Family of mites

Laminosioptidae is a family of mites belonging to the order Sarcoptiformes.

Genera:

- Aratingocoptes Fain & Perez, 1990
- Colicoptes Lombert & Lukoschus, 1981
- Fainocoptes Lukoschus & Lombert, 1979
- Laminosioptes Mégnin, 1880
- Rallicoptes Lukoschus & Lombert, 1980
