= ML domain =

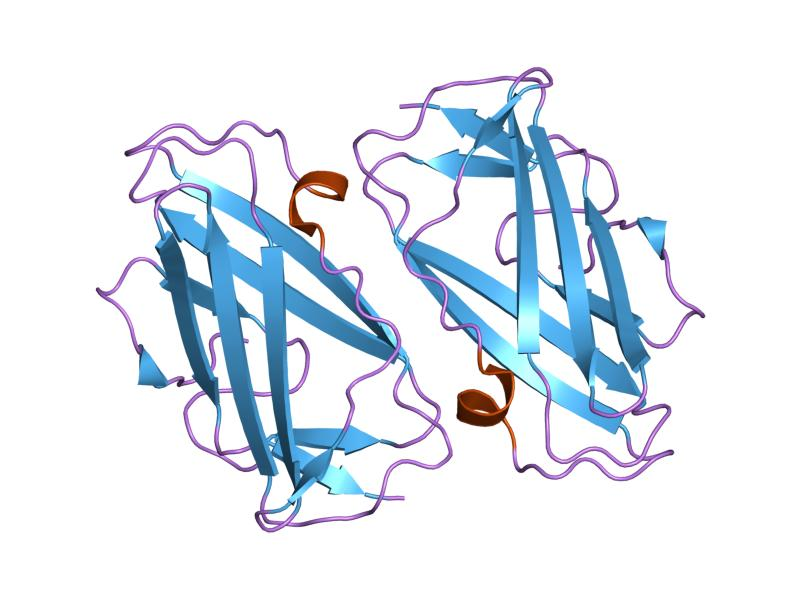
- X-ray structure of Der p 2, the major house dust mite allergen

Identifiers
- Symbol: E1_DerP2_DerF2
- Pfam: PF02221
- InterPro: IPR003172
- SCOP2: 1a9v / SCOPe / SUPFAM
- OPM superfamily: 91
- OPM protein: 1nep
- CDD: cd00912
Available protein structures:
- PDB: IPR003172 PF02221 (ECOD; PDBsum)
- AlphaFold: IPR003172; PF02221

The MD-2-related lipid-recognition (ML) domain is implicated in lipid recognition, particularly in the recognition of pathogen related products. It has an immunoglobulin-like beta-sandwich fold similar to that of immunoglobulin E-set domains. This domain is present in the following proteins:

- Epididymal secretory protein E1 (also known as Niemann-Pick C2 protein), which is known to bind cholesterol. Niemann-Pick disease type C2 is a fatal hereditary disease characterised by accumulation of low-density lipoprotein-derived cholesterol in lysosomes.
- House dust mite allergen proteins such as Der f 2 from Dermatophagoides farinae and Der p 2 from Dermatophagoides pteronyssinus.

== Human proteins containing this domain ==
LY86; LY96; MMD-1;
