= Dust =

Small particles in the air and settling onto surfaces

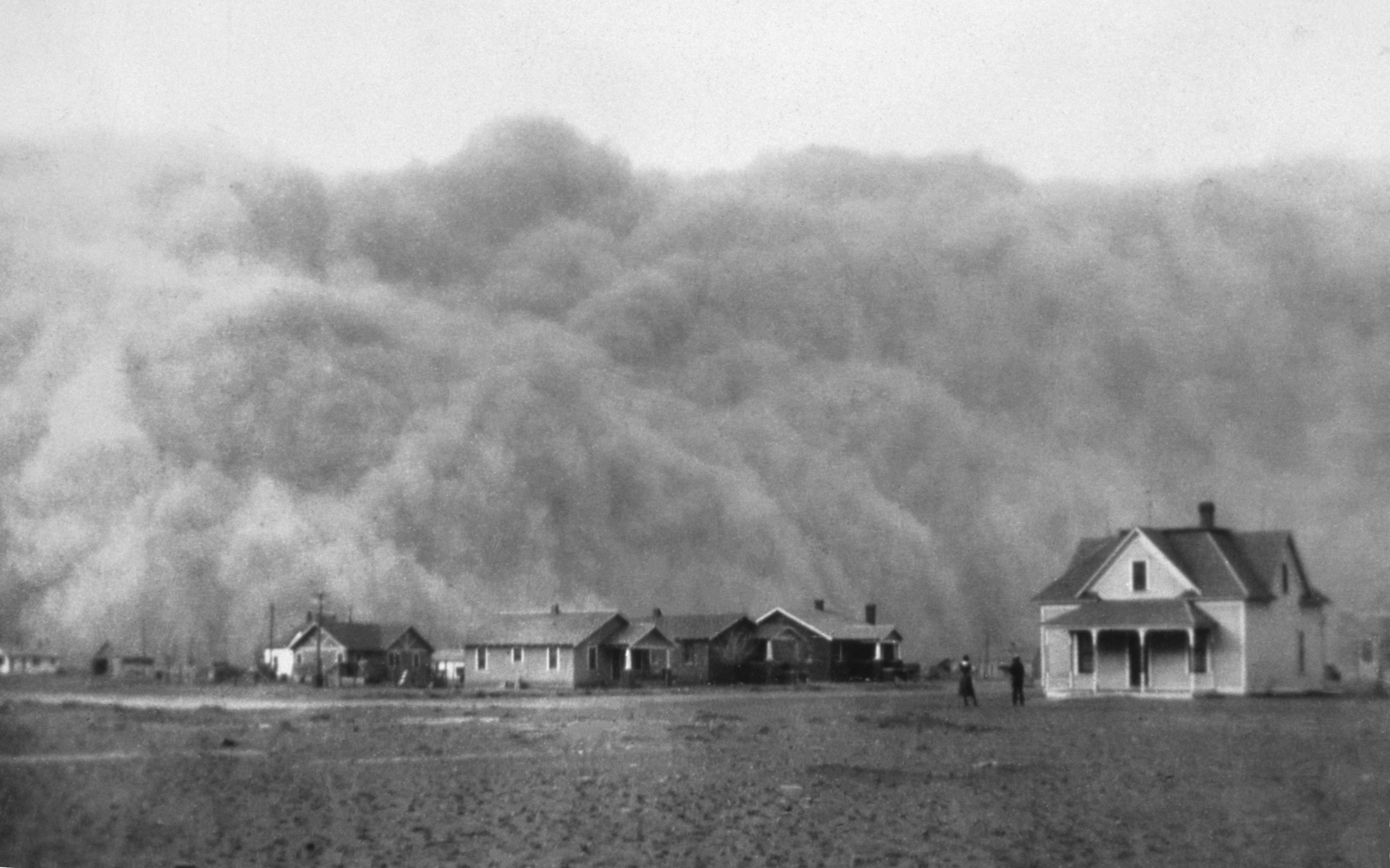
A dust storm blankets houses in Texas, 1935

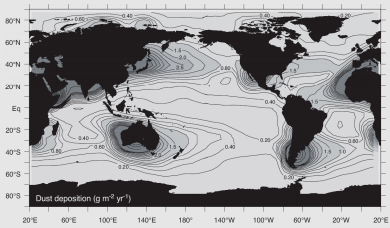
Global oceanic distribution of dust deposition

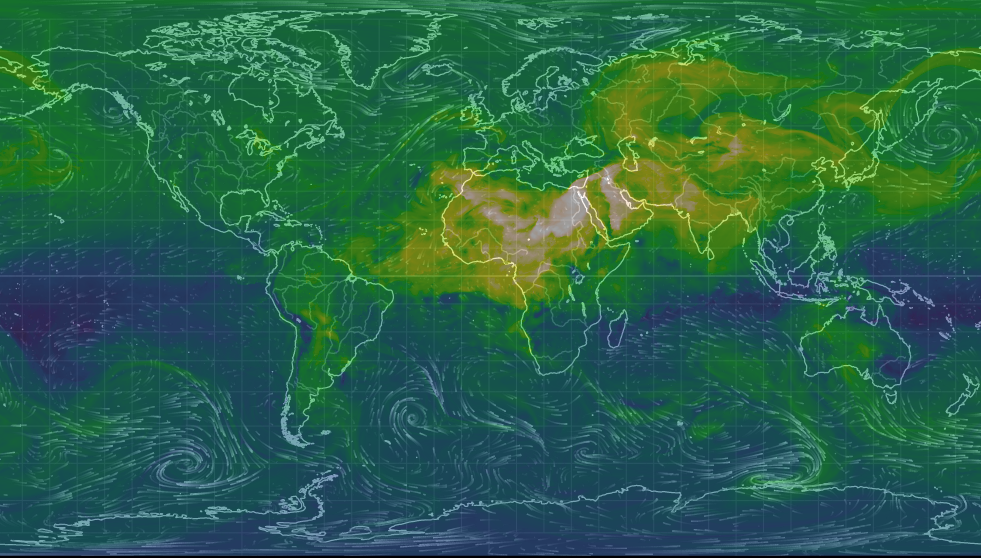
Map of dust in 2017

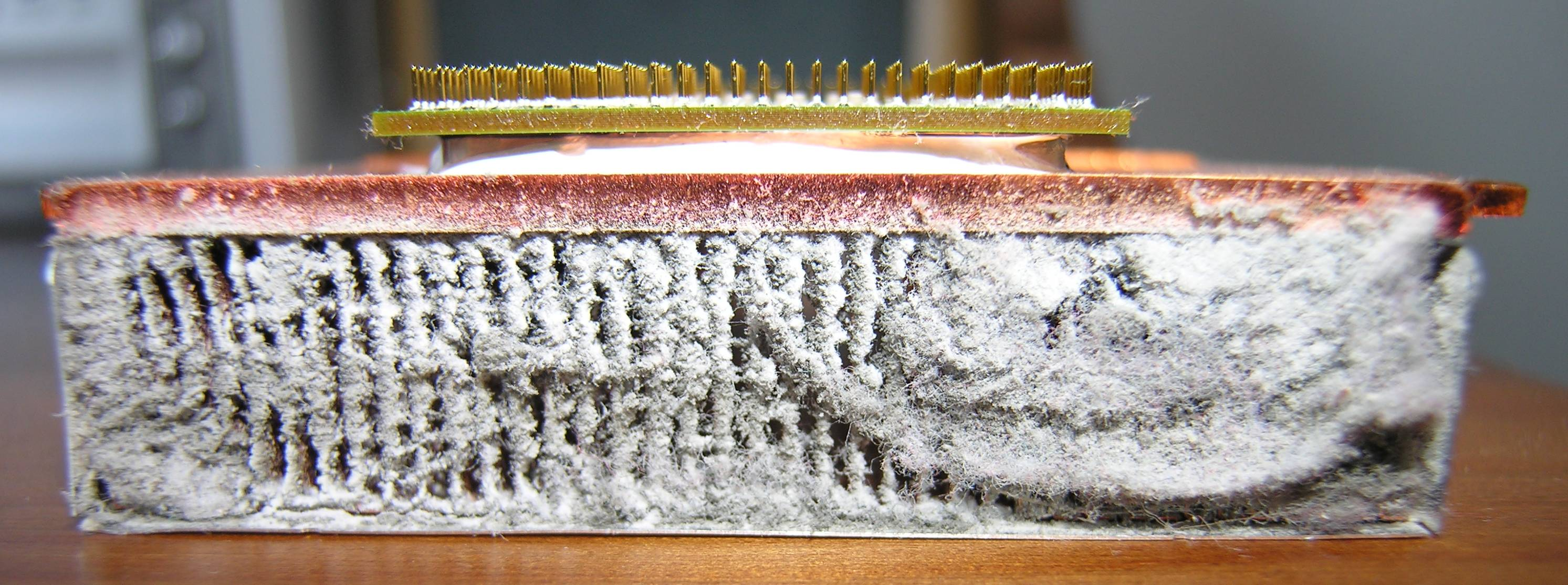
Three years of use without cleaning has caused this laptop heat sink to become clogged with dust, such that it can no longer be used.

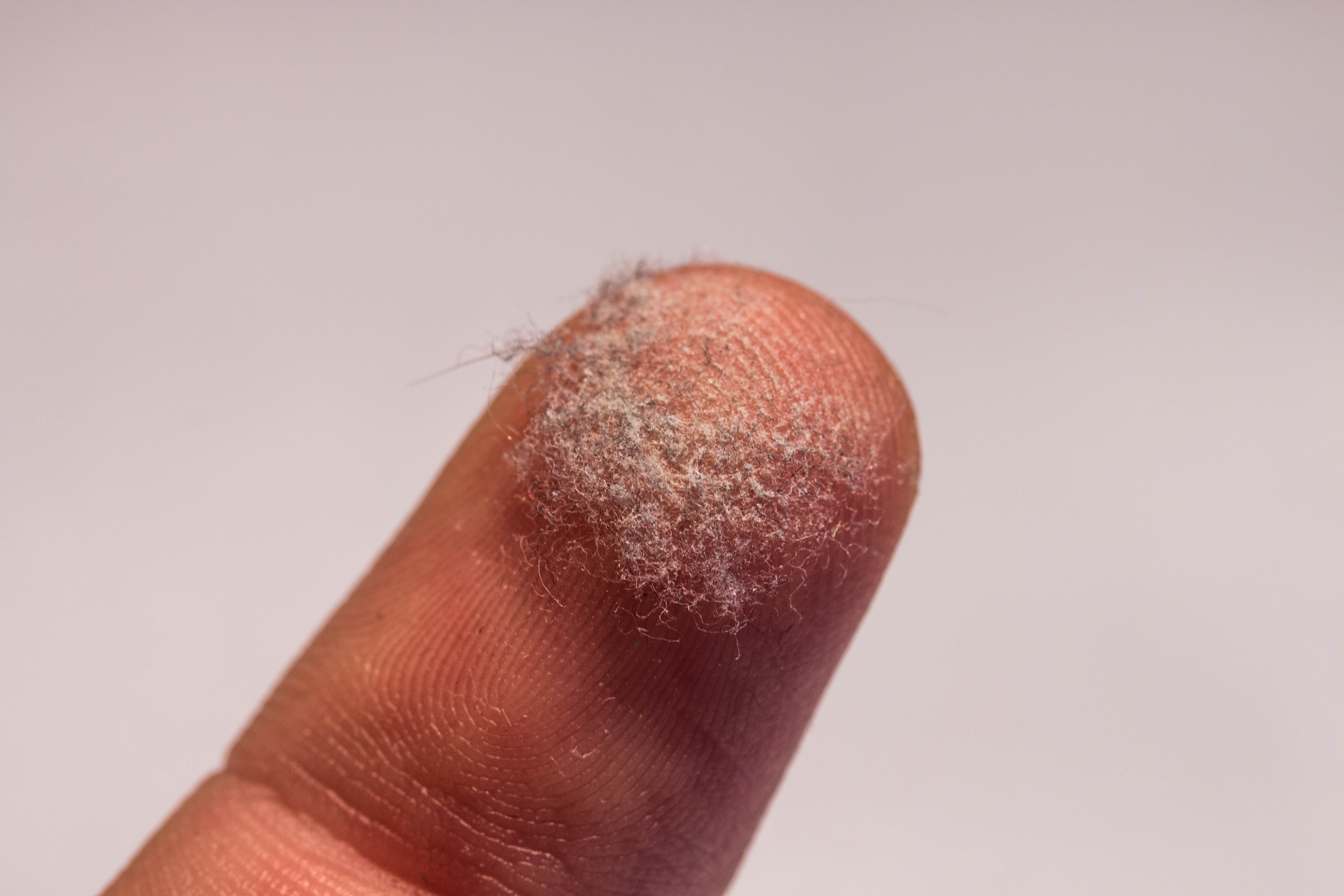
Domestic dust on a finger

Dust is made of fine particles of solid matter. On Earth, it generally consists of particles in the atmosphere that come from various sources such as soil lifted by wind (an aeolian process), volcanic eruptions, and pollution. Dust can be considered an aerosol when fine particles remain suspended in the atmosphere for extended time.

Dust in homes, offices, and other built environments is composed of about 20–50% dead skin cells. The rest, is composed of small amounts of plant pollen, human hairs, animal fur, textile fibers, paper fibers, minerals from outdoor soil, burnt meteorite particles, and many other materials which may be found in the local environment.

Total suspended dust (TSD) concentration, as measured in mg/m^{3}, can vary between 0.01 to 10,000 mg/m^{3} in various outdoor environments: residential, industrial, and commercial areas, highways, dirt roads (single or multiple vehicle traffic), quarries, and sand storms.

== Atmospheric ==
Presentation on imported dust in North American skies

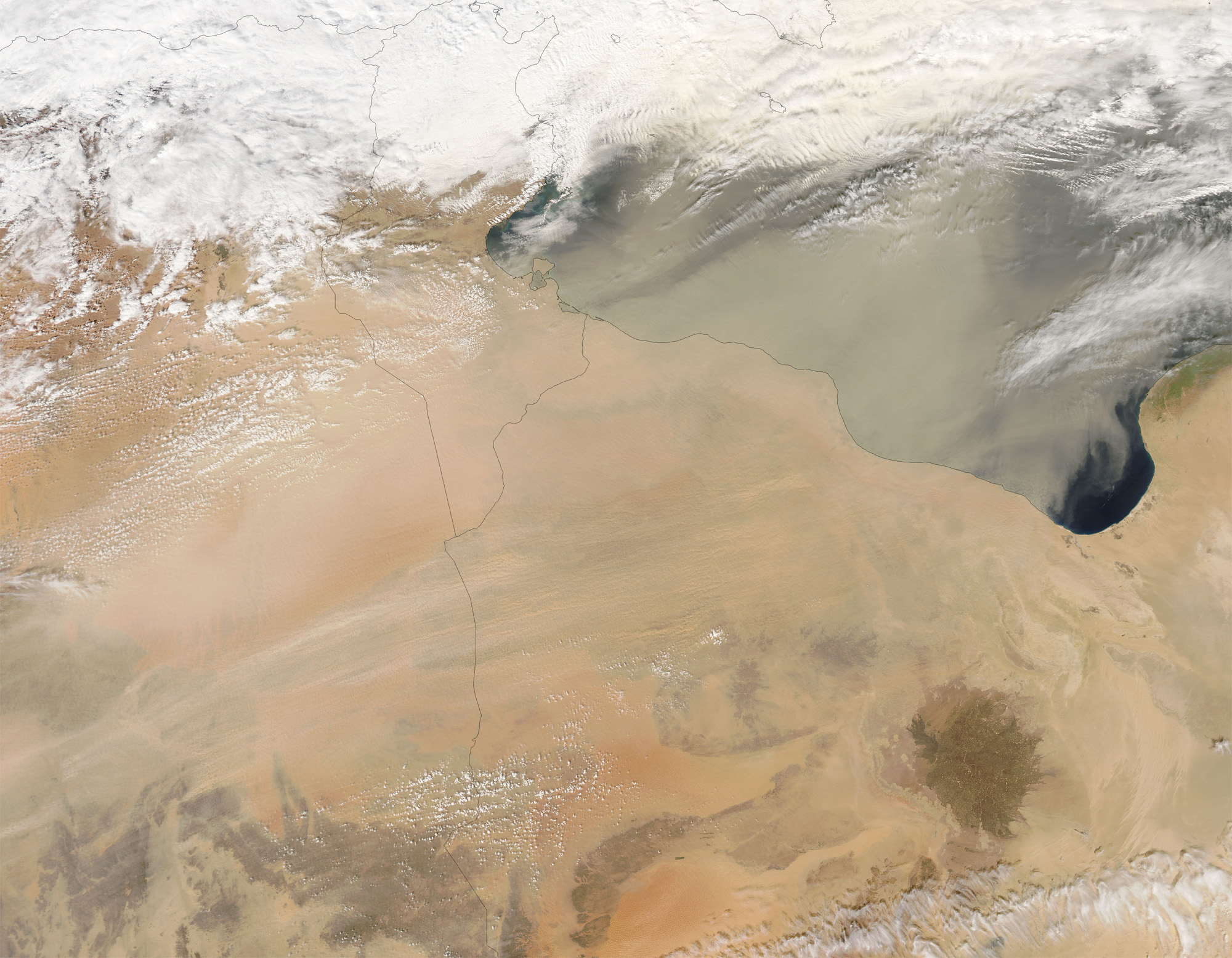
Large dust storm over Libya

Atmospheric or wind-borne fugitive dust, also known as aeolian process dust, as transported through the troposphere, primarily comes from saltation and dry regions where high-speed winds can remove mostly silt-sized, up to 1/16mm, material that will abrade susceptible surfaces to create more dust. This includes areas where grazing, ploughing, vehicle use, and other human behaviors have further destabilized the land, though not all dust source areas have been largely affected by anthropogenic impacts. Dust-producing surfaces cover one-third of the global land area, roughly 13 billion hectares, made up of hyper-arid regions like the Sahara, which covers 0.9 billion hectares, and drylands, which occupy 5.2 billion hectares.

Airborne dust is considered an aerosol that once in the atmosphere can produce strong local radiative forcing and intensity can be measured by the aerosol optical depth(AOD). Saharan dust, in particular, can be transported and deposited as far as the Caribbean and the Amazon basin and may affect air temperature, ocean temperature, and rainfall amounts.

=== Middle East ===
Dust in the Middle East has been a historic phenomenon. Recently, because of climate change and the escalating process of desertification, aerosol optical depth in the Middle East has been increasing. As a multi-factor phenomenon, there is not yet a clear consensus on the sources or potential solutions to adjust Middle Eastern dust levels.

==== Iran ====
Dust in Iraq and Iran are migratory systems that move from west to east and have the highest intensity, concentration, and extent until mid-summer, then reverse and flow from east to west in the spring. The causes of their occurrence are the lack of humidity, dry environment, low rainfall, and annual droughts. Due to the decrease of rainfall in areas such as Iraq and Syria, most of the dust in Iran also originates from the regions of Iraq, Syria, and Jordan.

In Iran, foreign dust contributions have formed new dust areas in recent years or increased the size of existing dust areas. Among these areas, parts of southern Tehran, south of Alborz province – which in the past were plains, riverbeds, seasonal lakes, and seasonal reservoirs – and Gavkhoni wetland of Isfahan province have become dry and prone to dust.

Qom salt lake in Qom province, Hamun lake, and Urmia lake areas have become dust centers, due to strong winds, and lake size reduction, primarily due to drought,, where some areas of the lake which were previously underwater are now exposed to wind erosion.

In Iran, the dust directly affects more than 5 million people and has become a serious government issue recently. In the Khuzestan province, it has led to the severe increase of air pollution. The amount of pollutants in the air has surpassed more than 50 times the normal level several times in a year.

Director General of the Office of Desert Affairs of Iran's Natural Resources and Watershed Organization stated that according to the data of the 2018 studies, 30 million hectares of land in the country are affected by wind erosion, and 14 million hectares of this area are considered to be the focal points of wind erosion, which causes serious damage to infrastructure.

=== Roads ===
Dust kicked up by vehicles traveling on roads is a significant source of harmful air pollution. Road dust consists of deposits of vehicle and industrial exhaust gas, particles from tire and brake wear, dust from paved roads or potholes, and dust from construction sites. Road dust is a significant contributor to the generation and release of particulates into the atmosphere. Control of road dust is a significant challenge in urban areas, and also in other locations with high levels of vehicular traffic upon unsealed roads, such as mines and landfills.

"Engine exhaust emissions, especially from those operating on diesel fuel, can be a significant source of fine particle generation from construction sites." Construction and demolition activities can also produce a large amount of construction waste. The dust and particulates can become fugitive and airborne with vehicle movements both on and outside the sites, especially when it is windy and dry.

== Coal ==
Coal dust is responsible for the respiratory disease known as pneumoconiosis, including coal worker's pneumoconiosis disease that occurs among coal miners. The danger of coal dust resulted in environmental law regulating workplace air quality in some jurisdictions. In addition, if enough coal dust is dispersed within the air in a given area, in very rare circumstances, it can cause a dust explosion. These circumstances are typically within confined spaces.

== Control and Suppression ==
Dust control is the suppression of solid particles with diameters less than 500 micrometers (i.e. half a millimeter). Dust poses a health risk to children, older people, and those with respiratory diseases.

=== Atmospheric ===
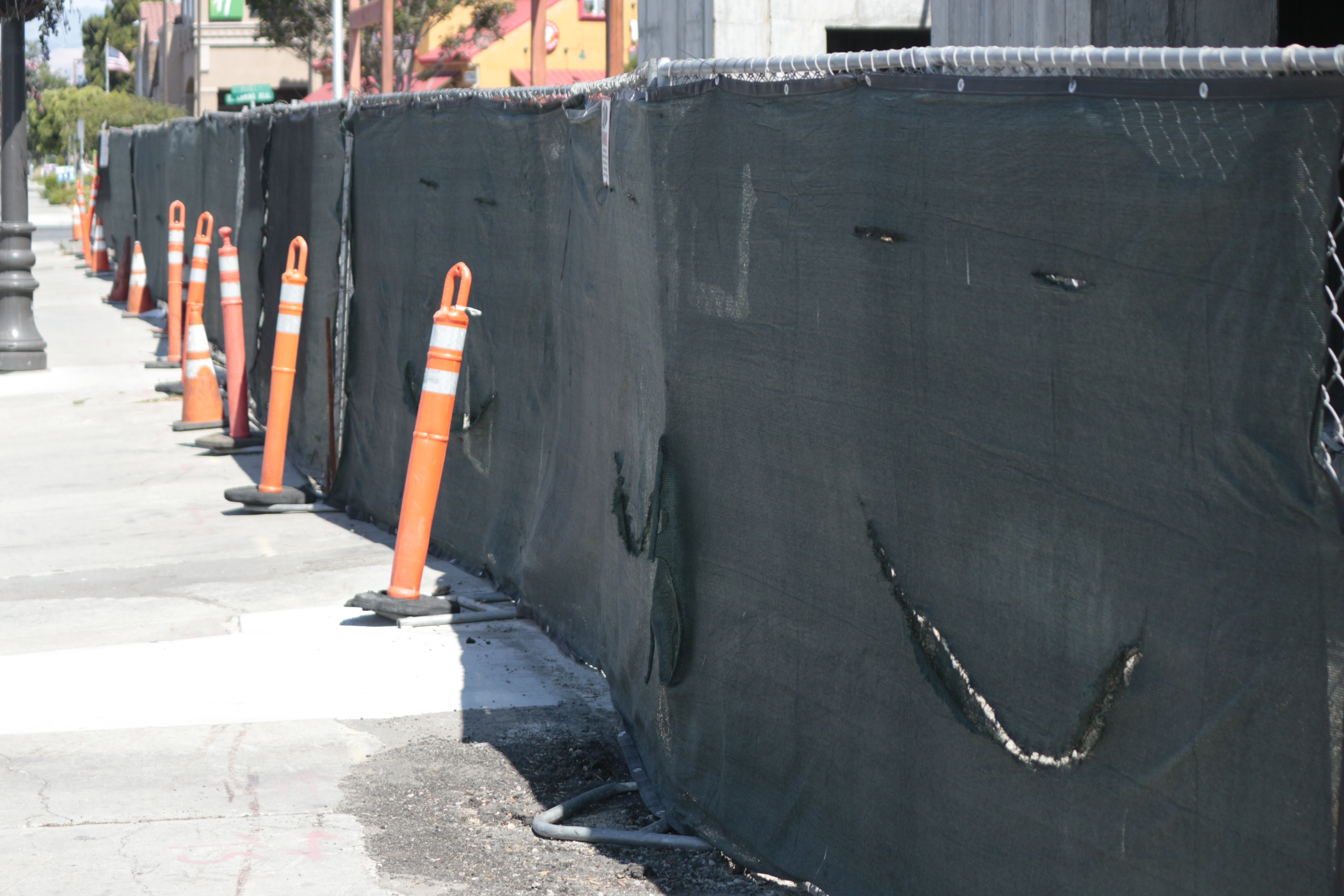
Tarps and netting are often used to reduce the amount of dust released from construction sites.

Most governmental Environmental Protection Agencies, including the United States Environmental Protection Agency (EPA) mandate that facilities generating fugitive dust minimize or mitigate the production of dust in their operation. The most frequent dust control violations occur at new residential housing developments in urban areas. United States federal law requires that construction sites obtain planning permissions to conduct earth moving and clearing of areas, so that plans to control dust emissions while the work is being carried out are specified. Control measures include such simple practices as spraying construction and demolition sites with water, and preventing the tracking of dust onto adjacent roads.

Some of the issues include:

- Reducing dust related health risks that include allergic reactions, pneumonia and asthmatic attacks.
- Improving visibility and road traffic safety.
- Providing cleaner air, cleaner vehicles and cleaner homes and promoting better health.
- Improving agricultural productivity.
- Reducing vehicle maintenance costs by lowering the levels of dust that clog filters, bearings and machinery.
- Reducing driver fatigue, maintenance on car suspension systems and improving fuel economy in automobiles.
- Increasing cumulative effects—each new application builds on previous progress.

==== Roads ====
US federal laws require dust control on sources such as vacant lots, unpaved parking lots, and dirt roads.

Dust in such places may be suppressed by mechanical methods, including paving or laying down gravel, or stabilizing the surface with water, vegetable oils or other dust suppressants, or by using water misters to suppress dust that is already airborne.

Road dust may be suppressed by mechanical removal methods like a street sweeper or vehicles equipped with vacuum cleaners, or by spraying the dusty road with vegetable oil, calcium chloride, water, or other dust suppressants. Improvements to engine emissions, brake pads, and tire durability in automotive engineering have reduced the PM_{10}s amount produced by road traffic; where the proportion representing re-suspension of existing particulates has increased as a result.

=== Household ===
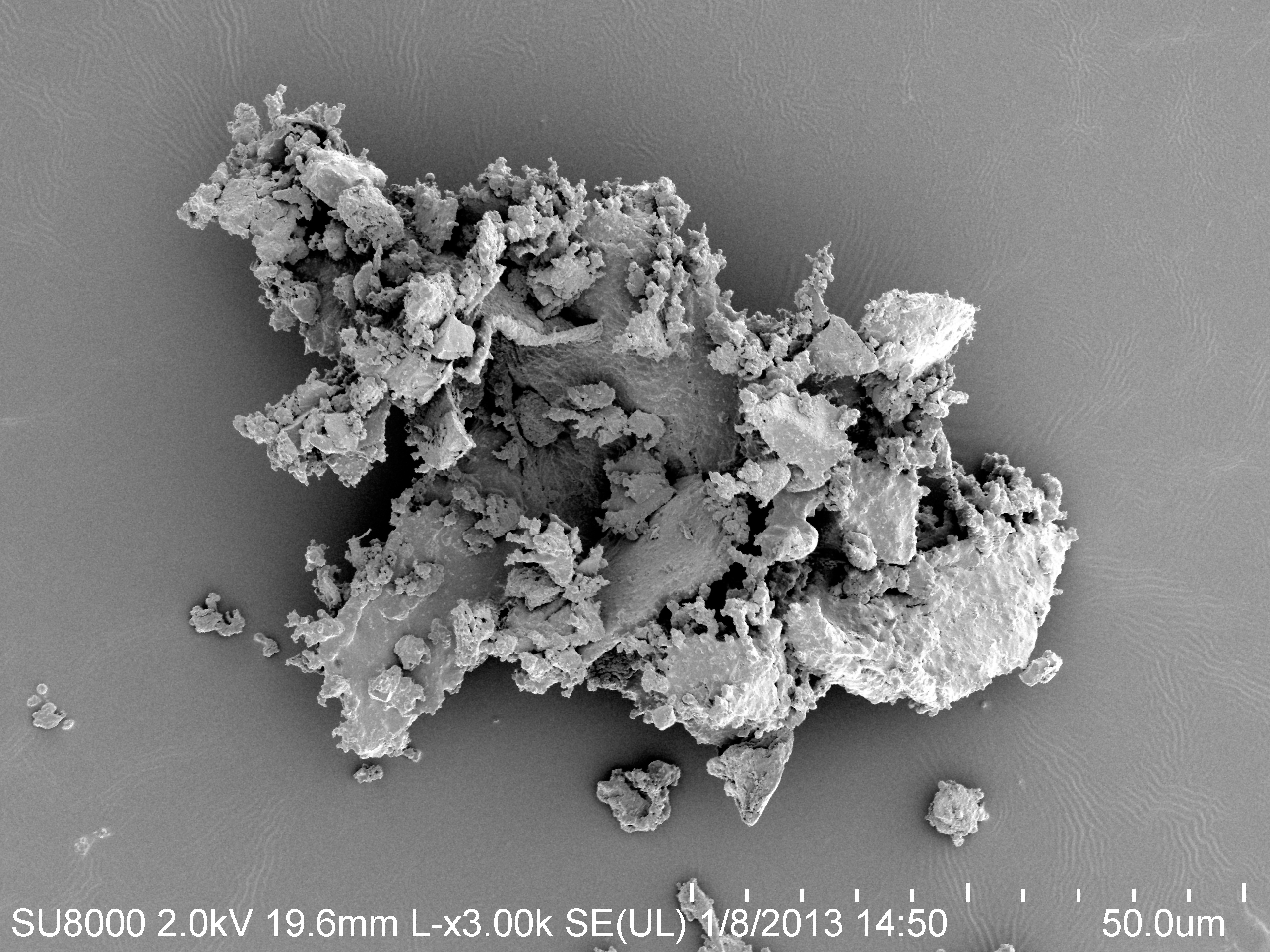
House dust under a microscope

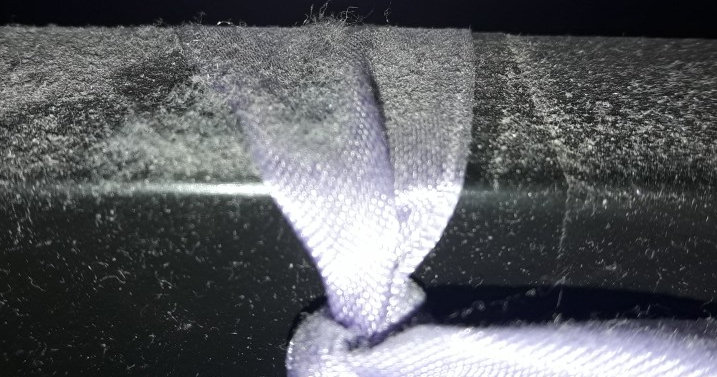
Domestic dust on a ribbon

A video on reducing dust exposure in the workplace

Care is required when removing dust to avoid causing the dust to become airborne. A feather duster tends to agitate the dust so it lands elsewhere but an electrostatic treatment to the duster or spraying the dust before wiping can improve dust removal.

Certified HEPA (tested to MIL STD 282) can effectively trap 99.97% of dust at 0.3 micrometers. Not all HEPA filters can effectively stop dust; while vacuum cleaners with HEPA filters, water, or cyclones may filter more effectively than without, they may still exhaust millions of particles per cubic foot of air circulated. Central vacuum cleaners can be effective in removing dust, especially if they are exhausted directly to the outdoors.

Air filters differ greatly in their effectiveness. Laser particle counters are an effective way to measure filter effectiveness; medical grade instruments can test for particles as small as 0.3 micrometers. In order to test for dust in the air, there are several options available. Pre-weighed filter and matched weight filters made from polyvinyl chloride or mixed cellulose ester are suitable for respirable dust (less than 10 micrometers in diameter).

=== Dust resistant surfaces ===
A dust resistant surface is a state of prevention against dust contamination or damage, by a design or treatment of materials and items in manufacturing or through a repair process. A reduced tacticity of a synthetic layer or covering can protect surfaces and release small molecules that could have remained attached. A panel, container or enclosure with seams may feature types of strengthened structural rigidity or sealant to vulnerable edges and joins.

== Outer space ==
Cosmic dust is widely present in outer space, where gas and dust clouds are the primary precursors for planetary systems. The zodiacal light, as seen in a dark night sky, is produced by sunlight reflected from particles of dust in orbit around the Sun. The tails of comets are produced by emissions of dust and ionized gas from the body of the comet. Dust also covers solid planetary bodies, and vast dust storms can occur on Mars which cover almost the entire planet. Interstellar dust is found between the stars, and high concentrations produce diffuse nebulae and reflection nebulae.

Dust is widely present in the galaxy. Ambient radiation heats dust and re-emits radiation into the microwave band, which may distort the cosmic microwave background power spectrum. Dust in this regime has a complicated emission spectrum and includes both thermal dust emission and spinning dust emission.

Dust samples returned from outer space have provided information about conditions of the early solar system. Several spacecraft have sought to gather samples of dust and other materials. Among these craft was Stardust, which flew past 81P/Wild in 2004, and returned a capsule of the comet's remains to Earth. In 2010 the Japanese Hayabusa spacecraft returned samples of dust from the surface of an asteroid.

== Atmospheric gallery ==
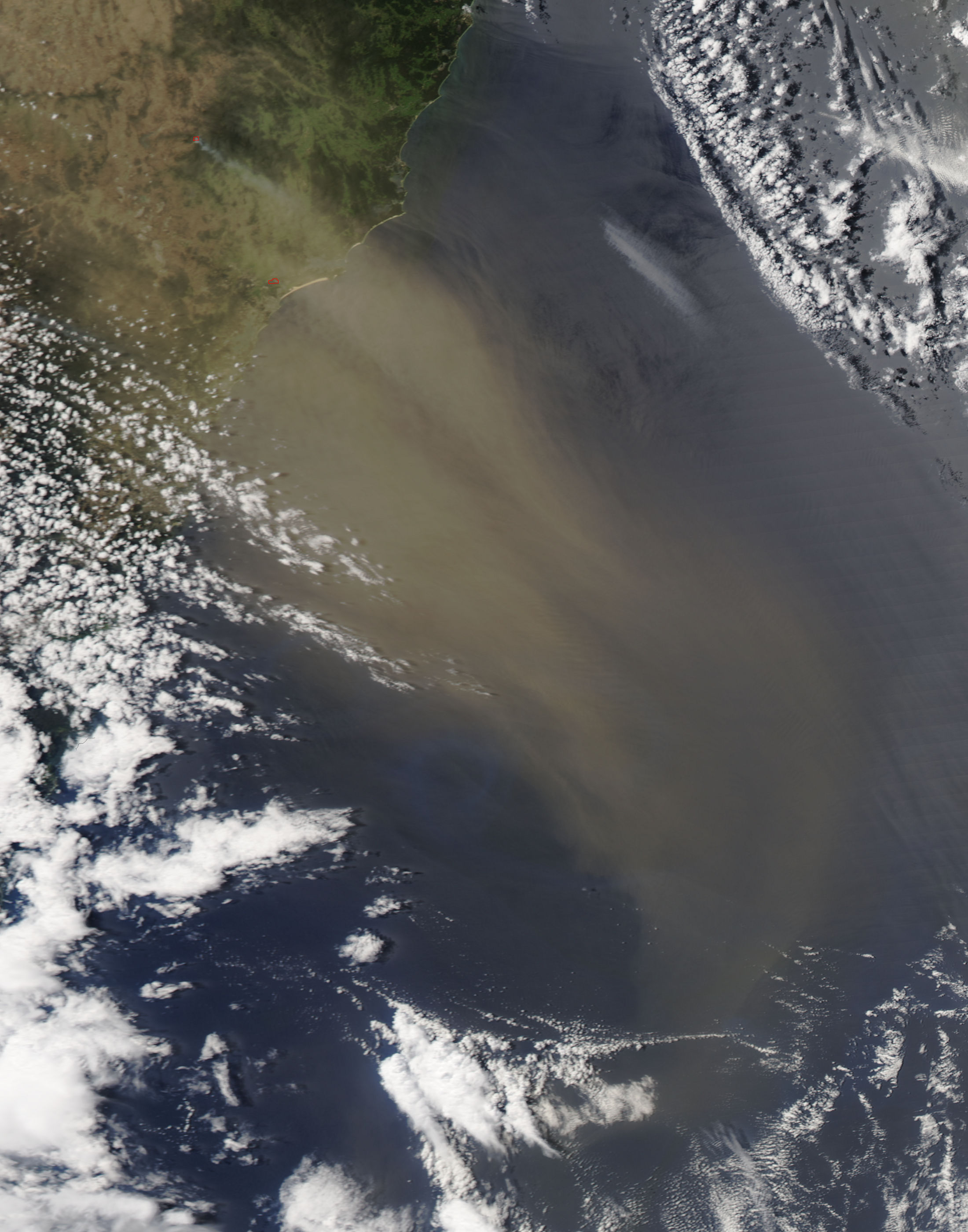
Dry, windy weather sends clouds of dust across south-eastern Australia.

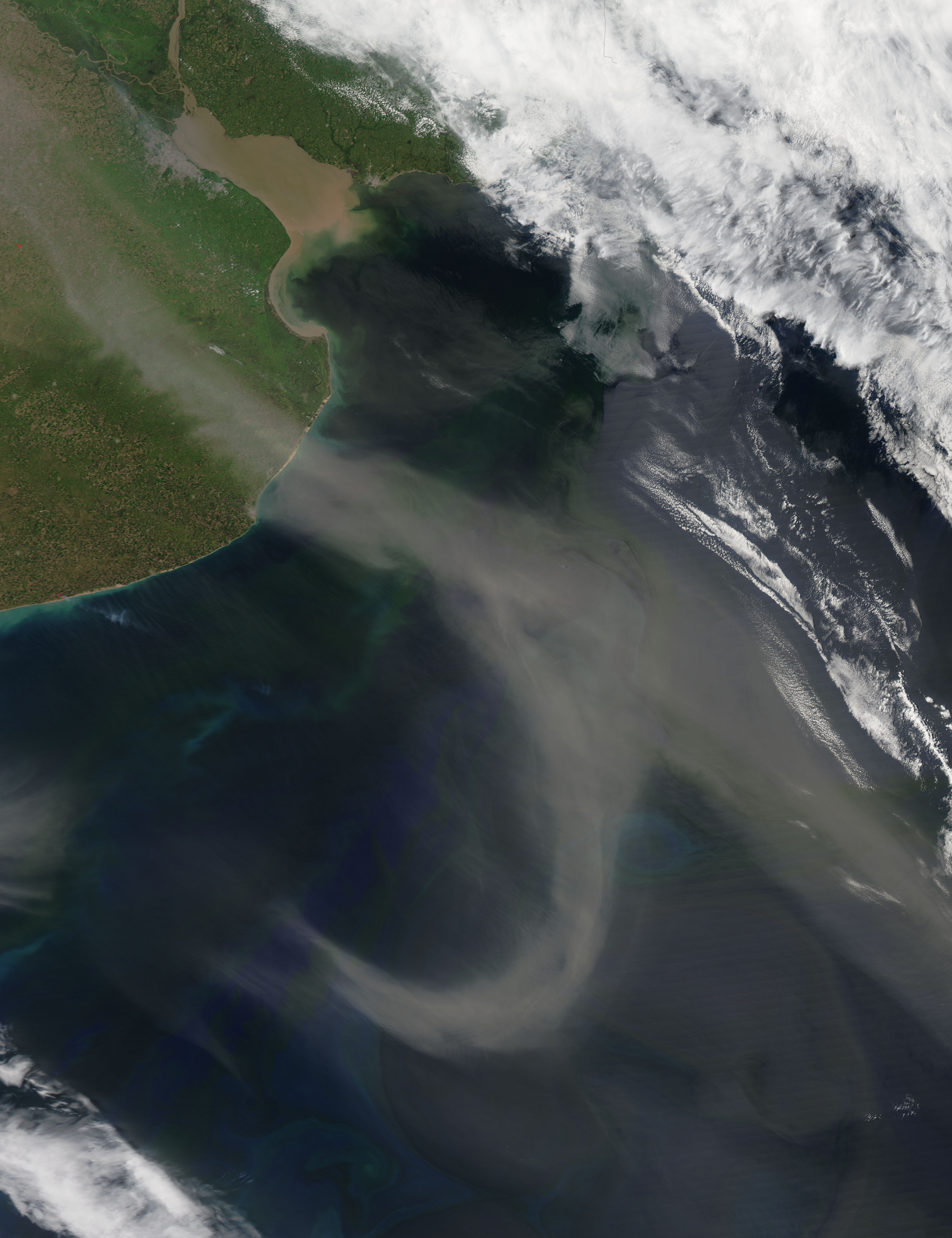
A pale brown plume of dust sweeps out of Argentina's Pampas.

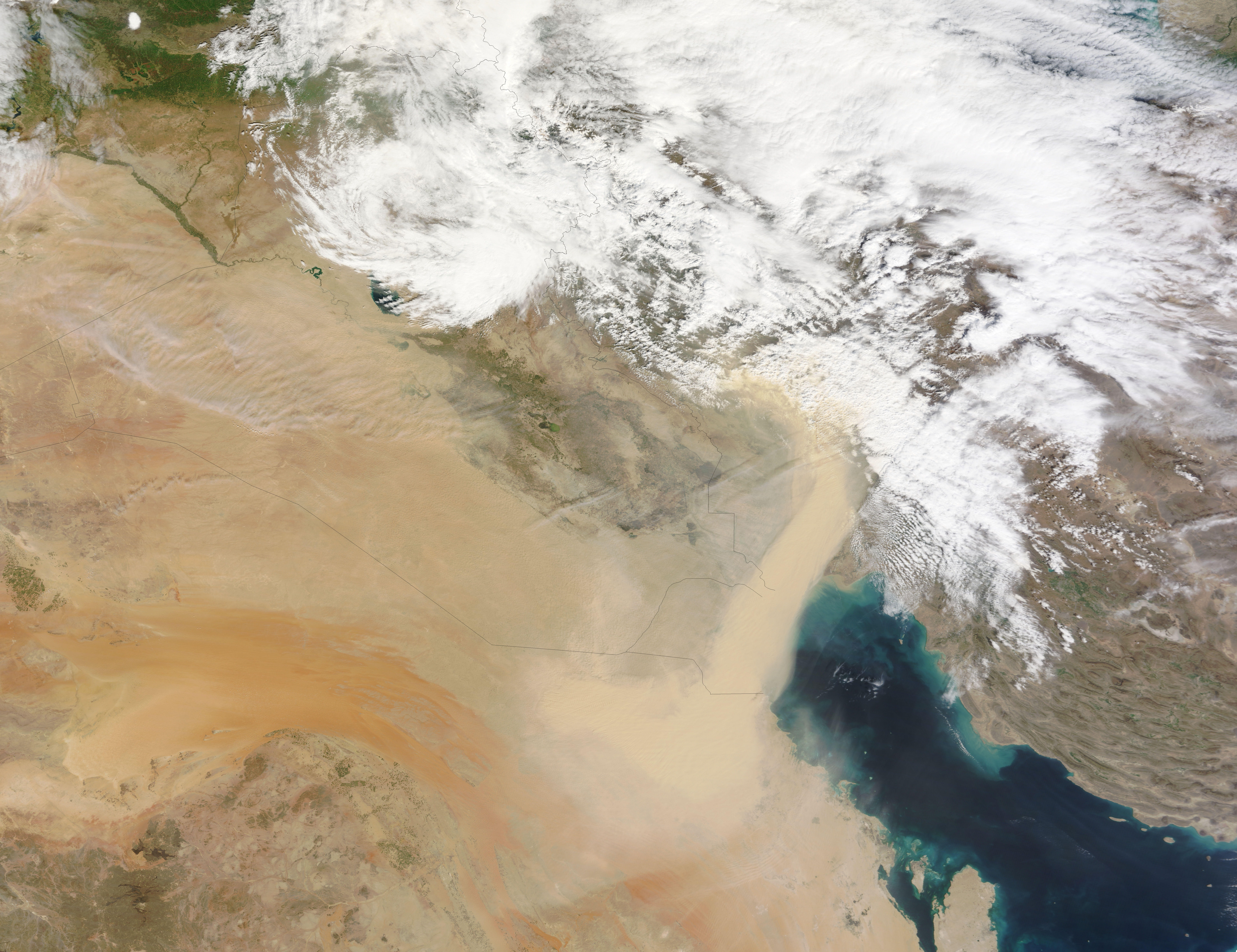
A thick dust plume over Kuwait and the north-western tip of the Persian Gulf

== Dust bunnies ==
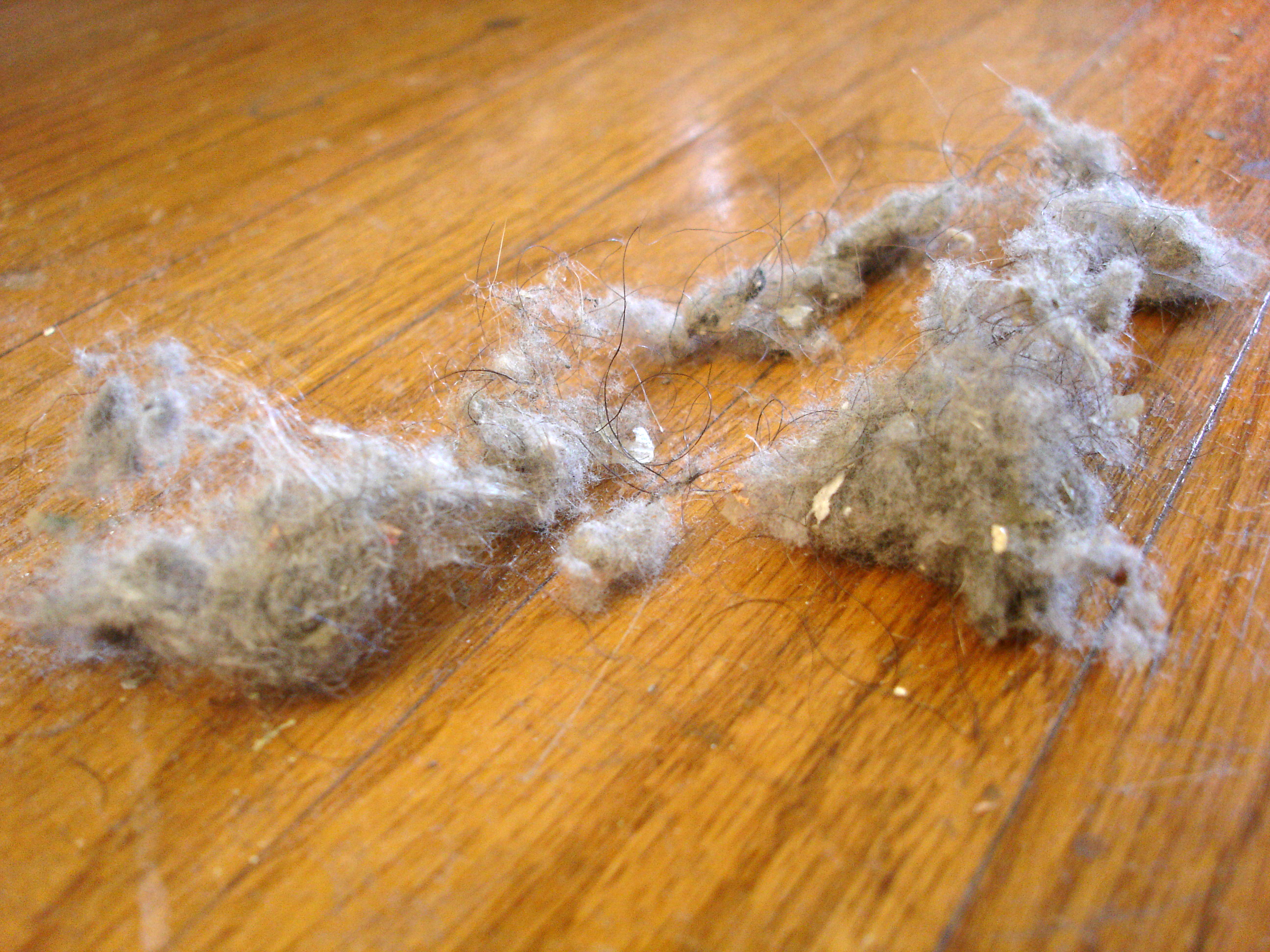
Dust bunnies

Dust bunnies (or dustbunnies) are small clumps of dust that form under furniture and in corners that are not cleaned regularly. They are made of hair, lint, flakes of dead skin, spider webs, dust, and sometimes light rubbish and debris and are held together by static electricity and felt-like entanglement. They can house dust mites or other parasites and can lower the efficiency of dust filters by clogging them. The movement of a single large particle can start the formation of a dust bunny. Dust bunnies are harmful to electronics because they can obstruct air flow through heat sinks, raising temperatures significantly and therefore shortening the life of electronic components. Dust bunnies have been used as an analogy for the accretion of cosmic matter in planetoids.

== Dust mites ==
House dust mites are present indoors wherever humans live. Positive tests for dust mite allergies are extremely common among people with asthma. Dust mites are microscopic arachnids whose primary food is dead human skin cells, but they do not live on living people. They and their feces and other allergens are major constituents of house dust, but because they are so heavy they are not suspended for long in the air. They are generally found on the floor and other surfaces until disturbed (by walking, for example). It could take between twenty minutes and two hours for dust to settle back out of the air.

Dust mites are a nesting species that prefer a dark, warm, and humid climate. They flourish in mattresses, bedding, upholstered furniture, and carpets. Their feces include enzymes that are released upon contact with a moist surface, which can happen when a person inhales, and these enzymes can kill cells within the human body. House dust mites did not become a problem until humans began to use textiles, such as blankets and clothing.

== See also ==
- Mineral dust
- Sawdust
- Moondust
- Medical geology
- Nephelometer
- Contamination control
- Occupational dust exposure
- Lint (material)
- Dust explosion
- Hanānā
- Dermatophagoides
