= Theseus (disambiguation) =

Theseus was the mythical king and founder-hero of Athens.

Theseus may also refer to:

== Vehicles ==
- Theseus (AUV), an autonomous underwater vehicle
- THESEUS (satellite), a proposed space telescope
- Bristol Theseus, an aircraft engine
- HMS Theseus, three ships of the Royal Navy

== Other uses ==
- Theseus (bug), a genus of stink bug in the tribe Halyini
- Theseus1 (THE1), an enzyme found in plant cells
- An electromechanical mouse constructed by Claude Shannon
- "Theseus", a 2008 episode of the radio comedy The Penny Dreadfuls
- "Theseus", a song by Patrick Wolf from The Bachelor
- "Theseus" (VisionQuest), an episode of the television miniseries VisionQuest

== See also ==
- Ship of Theseus, also known as Theseus's paradox
- Ship of Theseus (film), a 2013 Indian film by Anand Gandhi
- Theseus Ring, a gold signet ring that dates back to the Minoan period
- Morpho theseus, a butterfly
- Thésée (disambiguation)
- Teseo (disambiguation)
