= Microfauna =

Microscopic animals and similar organisms

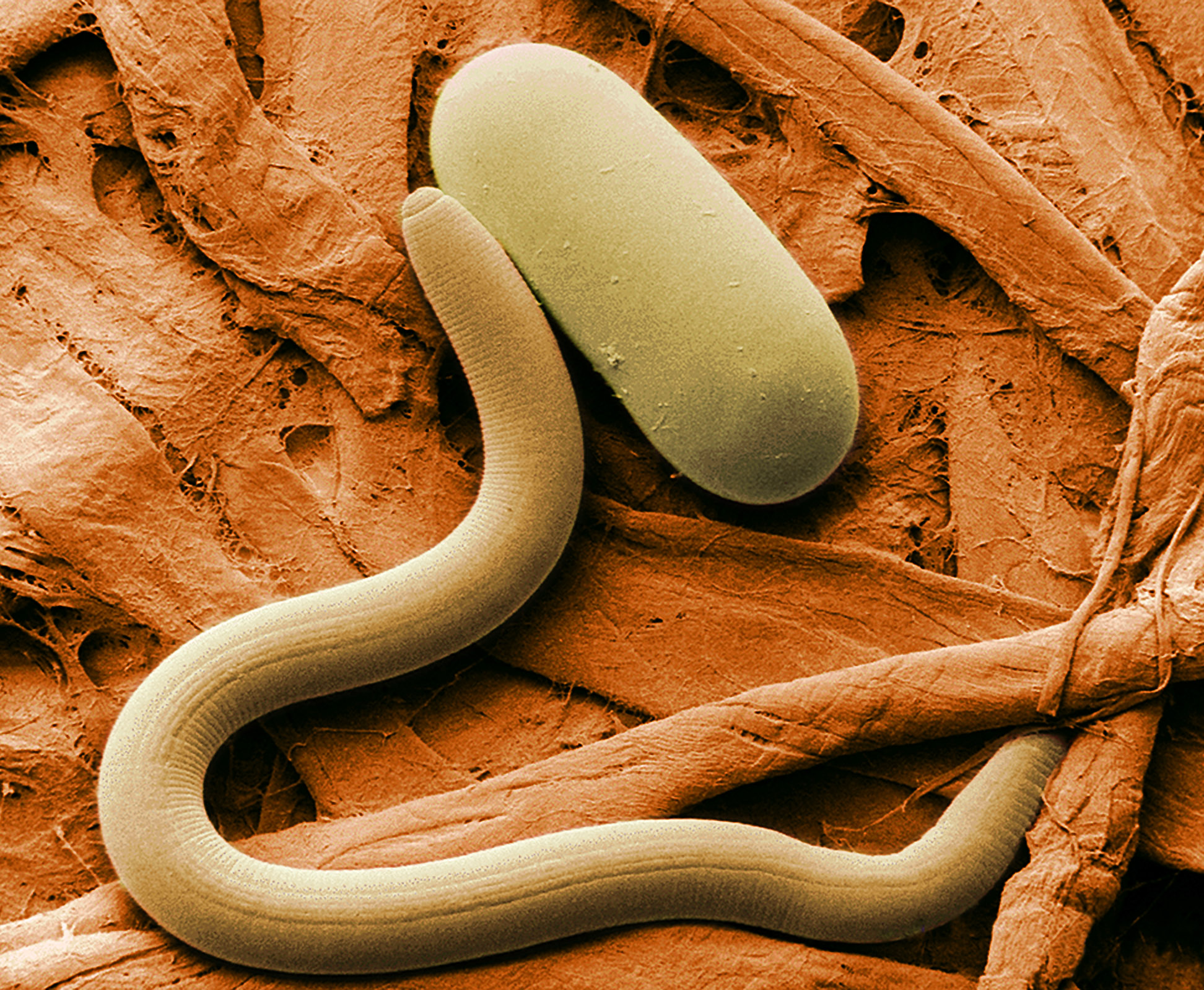
Scanning electron microscope image of a soybean cyst nematode and its egg

Microfauna (from Ancient Greek mikros 'small' and Latin fauna 'animal') are microscopic animals and organisms that exhibit animal-like qualities and have body sizes that are usually <0.1 mm. Microfauna are represented in the animal kingdom (e.g. nematodes, small arthropods) and some other heterotrophic, microscopic eukaryotes. A large amount of microfauna are soil microfauna which includes eukaryotic microbes, rotifers, and nematodes. These types of animal-like eukaryotic microbes and true animals are heterotrophic, largely feeding on bacteria. However, some microfauna can consume other things, making them detritivores, fungivores, or even predators.

== Habitat ==
Microfauna are present in every habitat on Earth. They fill essential roles as decomposers and food sources for lower trophic levels, and are necessary to drive processes within larger organisms. Populations of microfauna can reach up to ~10^{7} (~10 million) individuals per g^{−1} (0.1 g, or 1/10th of a gram) and are very common in plant litter, surface soils, and water films. Many microfauna, such as nematodes, inhabit soil habitats. Plant parasitic nematodes inhabit the roots of various plants, while free-living nematodes live in soil water films.

Microfauna also inhabit freshwater ecosystems. For example, freshwater microfauna in Australia include rotifers, ostracods, copepods, and cladocerans. Rotifers are filter feeders that are usually found in fresh water and water films. They consume a variety of things including bacteria, algae, plant cells and organic material.

Tardigrades inhabit a variety of lichens and mosses. They need water in these areas to allow for gas exchange and to prevent them from desiccating. Because of this they are considered aquatic. However, they have also been found in all types of environments, ranging from the deep sea to dunes.

== Role ==
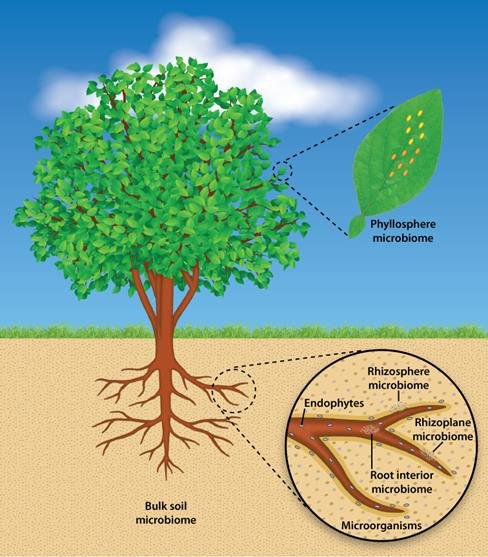
The microbiome of plants includes the phyllosphere and the rhizosphere.

One particular example of the role of microfauna can be seen in soil, where they are important in the cycling of nutrients in ecosystems. The ecological functions of the rhizosphere can be influenced by microfauna, specifically by nematodes and protozoa, which are abundant in soil. For instance, the carbon cycling within the soil can be affected by nematodes that will feed on the roots of plants, impacting the organic carbon in the soil. Similarly, soil protozoa are able to release phosphorus and nitrogen into the soil and higher trophic levels by dissolving the organic material and nutrients available.

Soil micro-fauna can also impact microorganisms within the rhizosphere by affecting their diversity and accelerating microorganism turnover. This happens because of the microfauna's selective grazing and their ability to influence the resources within the soil. For example, protozoa can help maintain the quality of the soil by grazing on soil bacteria. Through their grazing, the protozoa can help maintain populations of bacteria, allowing the bacteria to more efficiently decompose dead organic material which will improve the fertility of the soil.

Soil microfauna are capable of digesting just about any organic substance and some inorganic substances. These organisms are often essential links in the food chain between primary producers and larger species. For example, zooplankton are widespread microscopic animals and protists that feed on algae and detritus in the ocean, such as foraminifera.

Microfauna also aid in digestion and other processes in larger organisms.

== Phyla ==
Examples of notable phyla that include some microfauna:

- Microscopic arthropoda:
  - Dermatophagoides ("Dust mites")
  - Tetranychidae ("Spider mites")
  - Some Crustacea ("Crustaceans")
    - Copepoda ("Copepods")
    - Cladocera ("Water fleas")
    - Ostracoda ("Seed shrimp")
- Tardigrada ("Water bears" or "moss piglets")
- Rotifera ("Wheel animals")
- Nematoda ("Roundworms")
- Loricifera, these are recently discovered anaerobic species, which spend their entire lives in an anoxic environment.
  Microscopic images of microfauna
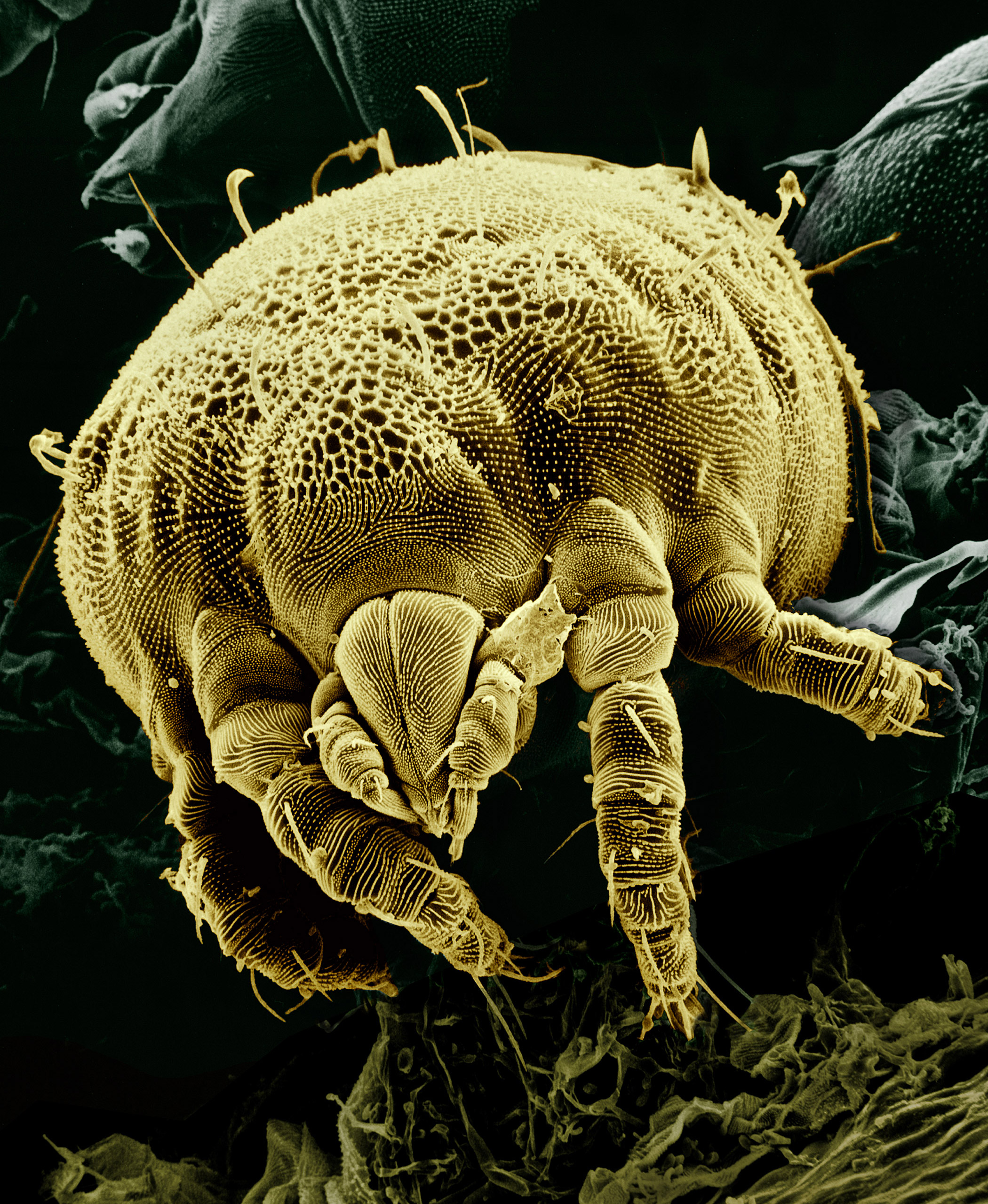
  Arachnid (Lorryia formosa)
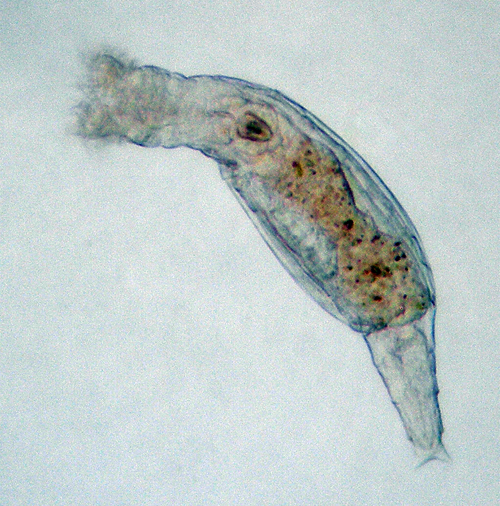
  Rotifera (Habrotrocha rosa), type of rotifer only found in the leaves of Sarracenia purpurea
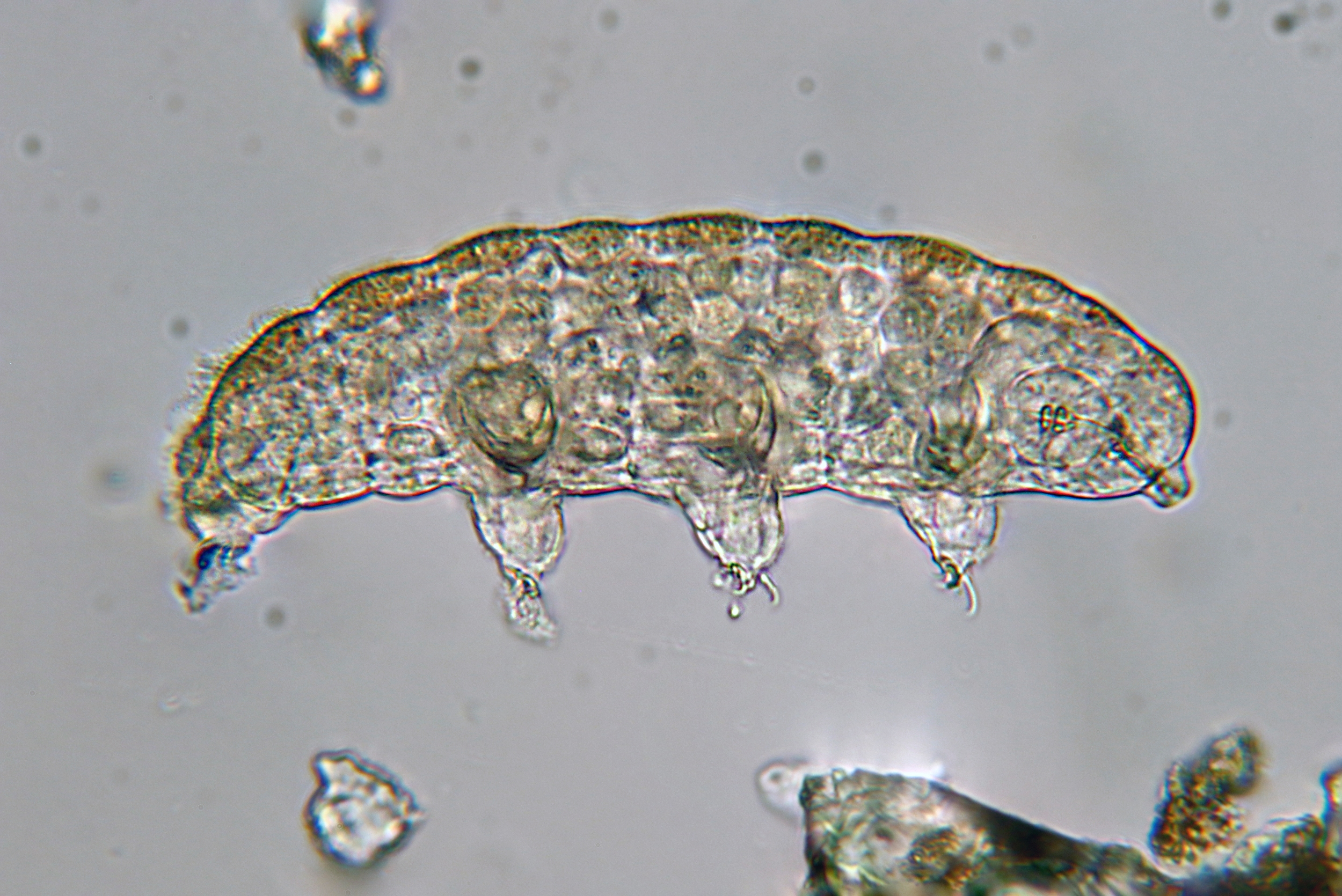
  Tardigrade that was extracted from moss
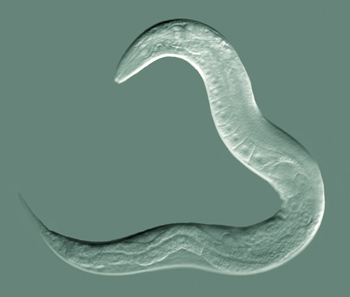
  Nematoda (Caenorhabditis elegans)

== Similar concepts ==
=== Macrofauna vs Microfauna ===
Macrofauna are organisms that are greater than 2 mm in size that usually inhabit soft sediments. They are also found in the benthic zone, and are suspension feeders or deposit feeders. They are important to the marine food web as they are preyed upon by other organisms. Macrofauna, such as flatworms, are able to be separated into small parts through fragmentation, and are able to decompose organic matter.

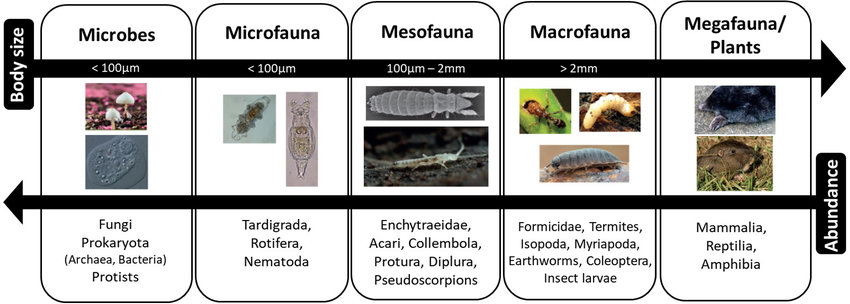
Size comparison of soil organisms

=== Microflora vs Microfauna ===
Microflora are non-animal organisms that reside within intestines and assist with the digestion of food. In soil, there are three main groups of microflora: viruses, fungi and bacteria.

== See also ==
- Fauna
- Megafauna
- Mesofauna
