= ATOSB =

Protein-coding gene in the species Homo sapiens

Identifiers
- Aliases: ATOSB, KIAA1539, P1.11659_5, bA182N22.6, family with sequence similarity 214 member B, FAM214B, Atos homolog protein B
- External IDs: MGI: 2441854; GeneCards: ATOSB

Gene location (Human)
Chr.	Chromosome 9 (human)
Band	9p13.3	Start	35,104,112 bp
Band	9p13.3	End	35,116,341 bp

Gene location (Mouse)
Chr.	Chromosome 4 (mouse)
Band	4|4 A5	Start	43,032,414 bp
Band	4|4 A5	End	43,046,220 bp
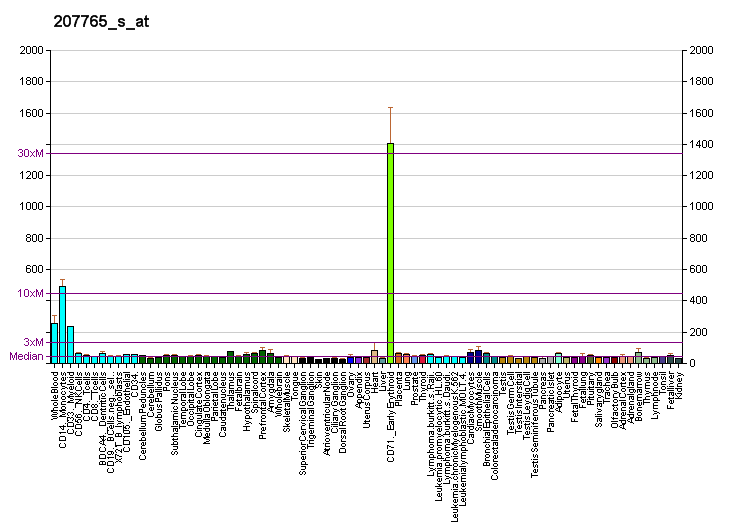

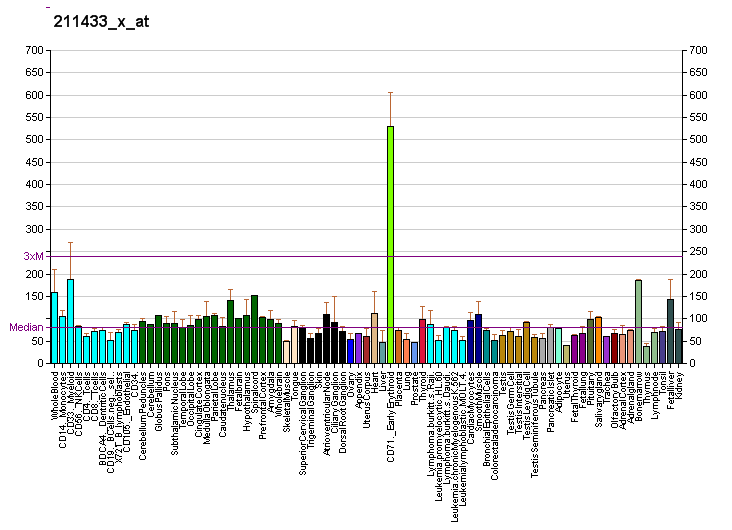
RNA expression pattern
Bgee	Human / Mouse (ortholog); Top expressed in: granulocyte; monocyte; blood; inferior ganglion of vagus nerve; subthalamic nucleus; C1 segment; right coronary artery; ascending aorta; myocardium of left ventricle; right lung / Top expressed in: ascending aorta; granulocyte; fetal liver hematopoietic progenitor cell; aortic valve; lip; lens; muscle of thigh; interventricular septum; blood; motor neuron; More reference expression data
BioGPS	More reference expression data
Orthologs
Databases	NCBI: entry; OMA: entry
Species	Human	Mouse
Entrez	80256	230088
Ensembl	ENSG00000005238	ENSMUSG00000036002
UniProt	Q7L5A3	Q8BR27
RefSeq (mRNA)	NM_025182; NM_001317991	NM_001253353; NM_001253354; NM_172691
RefSeq (protein)	NP_001304920; NP_079458	NP_001240282; NP_001240283; NP_766279
Location (UCSC)	Chr 9: 35.1 – 35.12 Mb	Chr 4: 43.03 – 43.05 Mb
PubMed search
- Wikidata
View/Edit Human	View/Edit Mouse

Atos homolog protein B (or ATOSB), is a protein that, in humans, is encoded by the ATOSB gene (previously denoted FAM214B). Not much has been reported about the function of the protein, but it is predicted to act as a transcription regulator.

The protein has 538 amino acids. The gene contain 9 exon. There has been studies that there are low expression of this gene in patients with major depression disorder. In most organisms such as mammals, amphibians, reptiles, and birds, there are high levels of gene expression in the bone marrow and blood. For humans in fetal development, FAM214B is mostly expressed in the brains and bone marrow.

== Gene ==
=== Aliases ===
This is also known as KIAA1539, BA182N22.6, FLJ11560, PI.11659_5, LOC80256, and RP11-182N22.6.

=== Location ===
FAM214B is located on human chromosome 9 at the locus position 9p13.3. The gene is 12,229 bp long and it is at position 35,104,112 bp to the 35,116,341 on chromosome 9.

=== Transcript variants ===
There are currently 2 mRNA transcripts variants of FAM214B. Variant 1 encodes the longest transcript and Variant 2 differs in the 5' UTR.

Table 1. Known human mRNA transcript variants for FAM214B
Name	Accession number	Number of Exons	Size (bp)
Transcript Variant 1	NM_001317991.2	9	3124
Transcript Variant 2	NM_025182.4	9	2999

== Protein ==
Predicted Secondary Structure using Phyre2

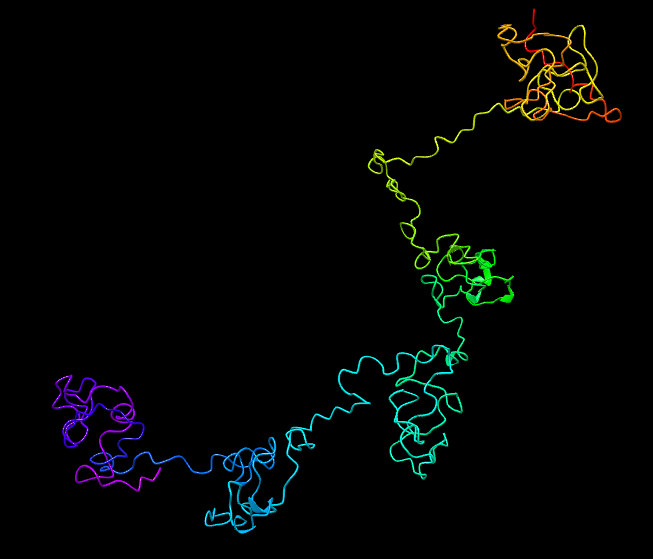
Predicted Tertiary Structure I-Tasser (ribbon style)

=== Isoforms ===
There are currently 2 isoforms for FAM214B protein, where isoform 1 encodes for Variant 1 for the longest protein and isoform 2 encoded by Variant 2.

Table 2. Known human protein isoforms for FAM214B
Name	Accession number	Size (AA)
Isoform 1	NP_001304920.1	538
Isoform 2	NP_079458.2	514

=== Composition and characteristics ===
The FAM214B protein has a predicted molecular weight of 56.7 kDa and has an isometric point of 9.1. For protein composition, the FAM214B protein contains high amounts of Glycine and Proline, while there was a lack of Isoleucine. There were clusters of positively charged regions on amino acid position 308 to 327 which composed of mostly Leucine and Arginine. There was a repetitive structure of amino acids GPGLG repeat on amino acid position 82 to 86, and 106 to 110. There were repeats of amino acids of Proline in position 10 to 25, and 225 to 265.

=== Protein domain ===
The FAM214B contains a DUF4210 domain of unknown function at the position 348 to 402, and a chromosome segregation domain at position 480 to 536. The DUF4210 domain is currently has unknown function and predicted to be necessary for chromosome segregation in meiosis.

=== Secondary structure ===
Using Phyre2, Ali2D, and I-TASSER predicted that the FAM214B secondary structure composed of mostly beta sheets and one alpha helix. Phyre2 prediction is shown on the right.

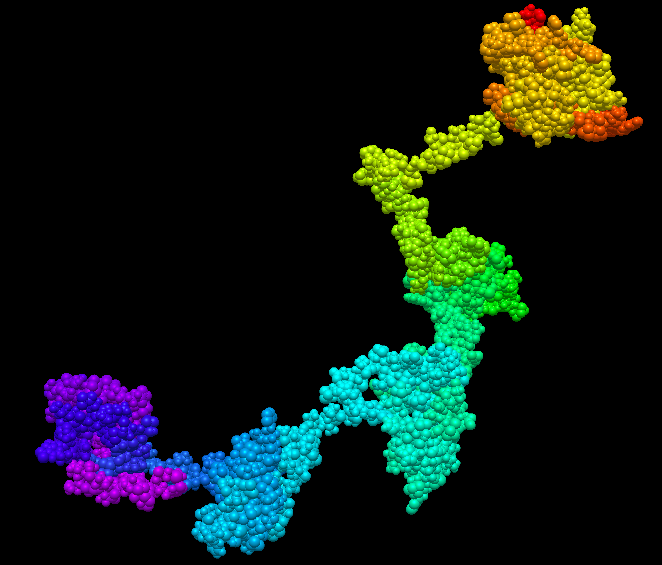
Predicted Tertiary Structure I-Tasser (sphere style)

=== Tertiary structure ===
Tertiary Structure was predicted using I-Tasser where the purple represents the C-terminal and the red represents the N-terminal shown on the right.

=== Post-translation modifications ===
==== Phosphorylation ====
There are 7 predicted phosphorylation sites on the FAM214B protein which consists of mostly serine and threonine residues.

Table 3. Predicted phosphorylation sites in FAM214B protein
Position	Amino Acid
119	Serine
240	Tyrosine
323	Serine
477	Tyrosine
491	Serine
494	Serine
508	Serine

=== Sub-cellular localization ===
Studies of FAM214B protein was determined that the protein is localized in the nucleus.

== Expression and regulation ==
=== Promoters ===
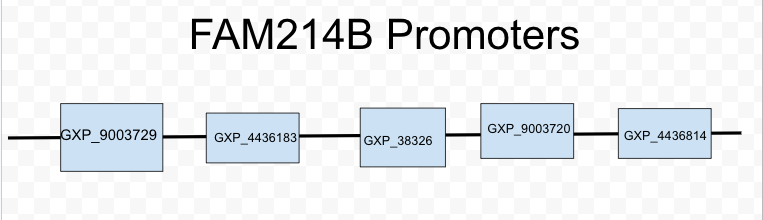
FAM214B Promoters

Using the Genomatix Gene2Promoter tool, it was determined that the FAM214B has 5 promoters that are found in Homo sapiens. The promoter GXP_38326 has the highest number of encoded transcripts which spans on position 35115811 to 35116911 on the negative strand of human chromosome 9.

Table 4. Promoters for FAM214B gene
Promoter ID	Start Position	End Position	Length (bp)	Orientation	Number of transcripts supported
GXP_9003729	35111384	35112610	1227	strand	4
GXP_4436183	35112353	35113392	1040	strand	1
GXP_38326	35115811	35116911	1101	strand	9
GXP_9003730	35116054	35117093	1040	strand	1
GXP_4436184	35116302	35117477	1176	strand	1

=== Transcription factors ===
FAM214B Promoter Transcription Factors

The table represents a list of predicted transcription factors that bind to the GXP_9003729 promoter using Genomatix MatInspector tool.

Table 5. Predicted transcription factors binding to GXP_9003729
Matrix Family	Detail Family Info	Matrix	Detailed Matrix Info
V$LEFF	LEF1/TCF	V$LEF1.02	TCF/LEF-1, involved in the Wnt signal transduction pathway
V$HOXF	Paralog hox genes 1-8 from the four hox clusters A, B, C, D	V$NANOG.01	Homeobox transcription factor Nanog
V$TCFF	TCF11 transcription factor	V$TCF11.01	TCF11/LCR-F1/Nrf1 homodimers
V$PERO	Peroxisome proliferator-activated receptor	V$PPAR_RXR.01	PPAR/RXR heterodimers, DR1 sites
V$BCDF	Bicoid-like homeodomain transcription factors	V$PTX1.01	Pituitary Homeobox 1 (Ptx1, Pitx-1)
V$RUSH	SWI/SNF related nucleophosphoproteins with a RING finger DNA binding motif	V$SMARCA3.01	SWI/SNF related, matrix associated, actin dependent regulator of chromatin, subfamily a, member 3
V$ZF42	C2H2 zinc finger transcription factors 42	V$ZNF692.01	Zinc finger protein 692 (AICAR responsive element binding protein - AREBP)
V$EGRF	EGR/nerve growth factor induced protein C & related factors	V$WT1.02	Wilms Tumor Suppressor
V$SAL4	Spalt-like transcription factor 4	V$SALL4.01	Spalt like 4, DRRS, HSAL4, ZNF797
V$PAX3	PAX-3 binding sites	V$PAX3.03	Pax-3 paired domain protein
V$MZF1	Myeloid zinc finger 1 factors	V$MZF1.02	Myeloid zinc finger protein MZF1
V$GATA	GATA binding factors	V$GATA1.01	GATA-binding factor 1
V$AP1R	MAF and AP1 related factors	V$MARE_ARE.01	Antioxidant response elements
V$TAIP	TGF-beta induced apoptosis proteins	V$CSRNP1.01	Cysteine-serine-rich nuclear protein 1 (AXUD1, AXIN1 up-regulated 1)
V$STAT	Signal transducer and activator of transcription	V$STAT5B.01	Signal transducer and activator of transcription 5B
V$ZF03	C2H2 zinc finger transcription factors 3	V$ZNF217.01	Zinc finger protein 217
V$BRNF	Brn POU domain factors	V$BRN2.03	Brn-2, POU-III protein class
V$GRHL	Grainyhead-like transcription factors	V$GRHL1.01	Grainyhead-like 1 (LBP32, MGR, TFCP2L2)
V$PERO	Peroxisome proliferator-activated receptor	V$PPARG.02	Peroxisome proliferator-activated receptor gamma
V$E2FF	E2F-myc activator/cell cycle regulator	V$E2F.01	E2F, involved in cell cycle regulation, interacts with Rb p107 protein

=== Expression ===
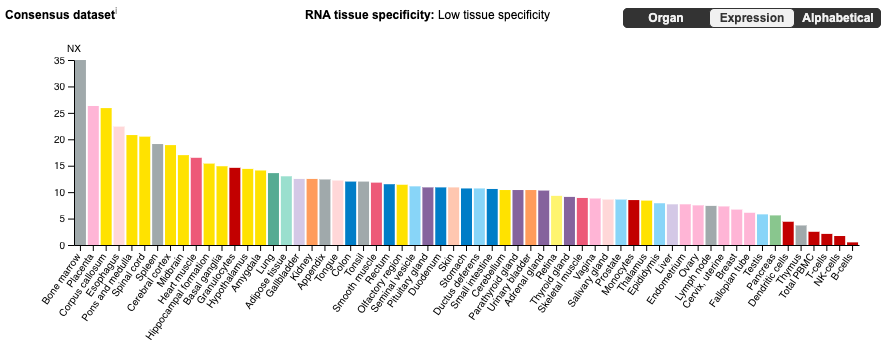
FAM214B Expression

==== Tissue specific expression ====
The RNA-Seq data from NCBI gene and The Human Atlas Protein shows that the FAM214B is highly expressed in the bone marrow, placenta, esophagus, and the brain such as corpus callosum, pons and medulla, and spinal cord.

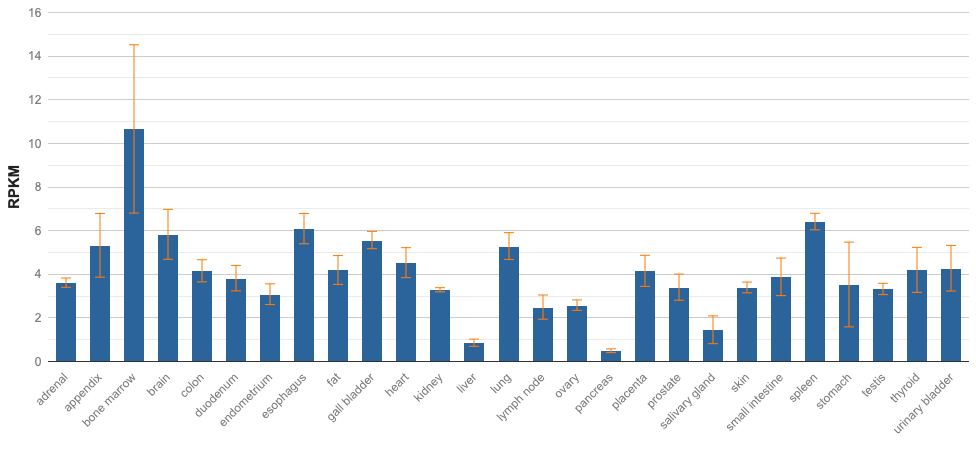
RNA-Seq Data FAM214B Expression

==== Embryonic development ====
An in-situ hybridization technique has been conducted on mouse embryos that shows high levels of FAM214B transcript in the hippocampus and neocortex.

==== Differential expression ====
There has been numerous experiments on levels of expression for FAM214B. Patients with diabetic nephropathy express higher levels of FAM214B gene than those who are normal. Patients with bipolar disorders expressed higher levels of FAM214B in the orbitofrontal cortex than those who are normal. Patients with allergic nasal epithelium responses to house dust mites have lower expression of FAM214B than those who did not have allergies to house mites.

== 3'UTR ==
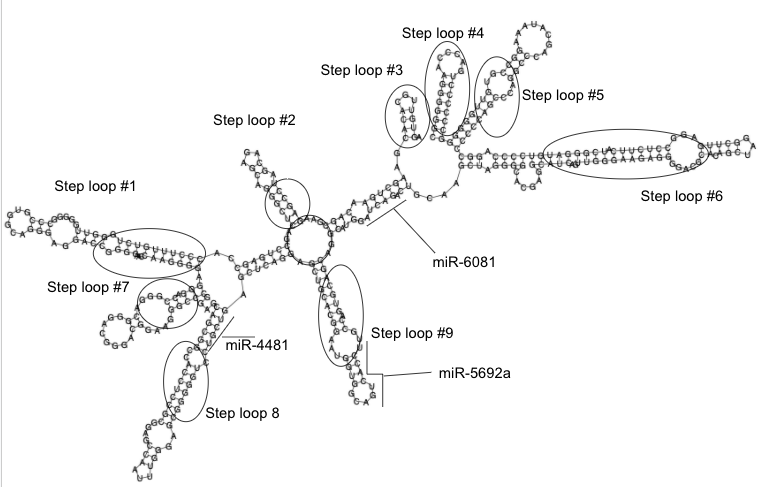
3'UTR

There are 9 stem loops and miRNAs that bind to FAM214B transcript 3'UTR shown on the right.

== Interacting proteins ==
A list of proteins that interact with FAM214B in IntAct and UniProt database.

Table 6. List of proteins that interact with FAM214B
Protein	Description
IKZF1	DNA-binding protein Ikaros
TRIM27	Zinc finger protein RFP
FHL5	Four and a half LIM domains protein 5
CEP70	Centrosomal protein of 70 kDa
TRAF4	TNF receptor-associated factor 4
KIF20A	Kinesin-like protein KIF20A
MDFI	MyoD family inhibitor
CYSRT1	Cysteine-rich tail protein 1
MYO1F	Unconventional myosin-If
EYA2	Eyes absent homolog 2

== Homology and evolution ==
=== Orthologs and paralogs ===
FAM214B has orthologs in Mammalia, Aves, Reptilia, Amphibia, Actinopterygii, Arthropodas, Ascomycota, Zygomycota, and Plantae. There is one paralog that is FAM214A. The FAM214A protein has 1076 amino acids and is located on chromosome 13.

Table 6. List of Homo Sapiens FAM214B orthologs
Genus and species	Common name	Taxonomic group	Date of Divergence (MYA)	Accession number	Number of Amino Acids	Identity
Mus musculus	Mouse	Rodenta	90	NP_001240282.1	538	91%
Chrysemys picta bellii	Painted turtle	Testudines	312	XP_005311754.1	646	45%
Gallus gallus	Chicken	Galliformes	312	XP_004937179.1	606	46%
Nanorana parkeri	Himalaya frog	Anura	351	XP_018429110.1	702	41%
Acipenser ruthenus	Sterlet	Acipenseriformes	435	XP_033861969.2	623	41%
Sarcoptes scabiei	Itch mite	Sarcoptes	797	KAF7489920.1	871	47%
Entomophthora muscae	Fly fungus	Entomophthoraceae	1105	KAF7753830.1	455	33%
Mikania micrantha	Bitter vine	Asterales	1496	KAD4889130.1	601	28%

=== Evolutionary history ===
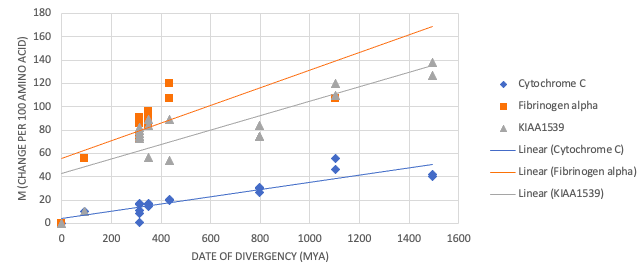
FAM214B Evolution Trend

The most distant species relating to humans was Mikania micrantha which was about 1496 MYA. The most closely related relative for this gene found in mammals comparing to humans was the mouse which was dated about 90 MYA. The FAM214B is conserved in Eukaryota. In terms of the molecular clock analysis, it seems that FAM214B has evolved quicker than Cytochrome c but much slower than Fibrinogen alpha.

== Studies of clinical significance ==
There are studies that show the gene expression of KIAA1539 in patients with major depression disorders by using biomarkers to detect vulnerability to recurrent depression. Low expression of this gene was common in patients who have MDD and was significantly difference than those who did not have MDD. Experiments were conducted in patients with major depression disorders by using biomarkers to detect vulnerability to recurrent depression and is expressed in patients with depressive disorders before and after cognitive behavioral therapy.
