= Theseus1 =

Plant cell enzyme

Theseus1 (THE1) is a transmembrane receptor-like kinase (RLK) that is found in plant cells. It was originally discovered in Arabidopsis thaliana as part of a family of 17 related proteins, commonly referred to as the Theseus1/Feronia family or the CrRLK family. So far, THE1 and 5 other members in the same family of RLKs have been found to play key roles in cell elongation during vegetative growth through interacting mostly with the cell wall. Though the exact mechanism for this process is still unknown, it is thought to be very similar to, and even partially regulated by, the brassinosteroid pathway. In addition, Theseus1 has the ability to detect changes in cell wall integrity and could possibly even recognize pathogenic sequences. While the workings of THE1 and other members of the CrRLK family are understood on a general level, research of the specific interactions between them has yet to be published.

== Discovery ==
Theseus1 was discovered, along with the other members in its family of RLKs, while researchers were attempting to describe a pathway of monitoring cell-wall stability in plant cells. It was first characterised from its interaction with a Procuste1 mutant (prc1-1). This Procuste1 mutant produces less cellulose because of alterations to the cellulose synthase site, resulting in drastically decreased cell wall elongation. When THE1 was also mutated in the presence of the prc1-1 mutant, the rate of cell elongation was increased to half-way between the normal growth and the prc1-1 only growth rate. Because of this interaction, it was named after Theseus, the mythological founder of Athens and killer of Procrustes. Theseus 1 was originally found in, and is still most commonly obtained from, Arabidopsis thaliana.

Other members of the same RLK family are named according to other mythological figures, such as Feronia, Anxur, and Hercules.

== Structure ==
Theseus1 is an 855 residue, type I transmembrane protein that has an extracellular N-terminus and an intracellular C-terminus. The serine/threonine kinase domain that is typical of RLKs is present on the intracellular C-terminal along with an adjacent binding site for ATP. There are also two internal phosphorylation sites that could possibly act as molecular switching sites for THE1 activation/suppression. The N-terminal contains a roughly 19 residue long dissociable sequence that is thought to be used for signaling about an issue in the cell wall.

Additionally, there are a few regions on the extracellular N-terminus of Theseus1 that closely resemble the structure of ML domains in other proteins, suggesting that it could have an additional function of monitoring pathogenic response in the cell wall.

== Activity ==
Theseus1 is normally expressed in all cells, with increased expression in tissues that are expanding. The enzymatic activity of THE1 can be described on its own, but most of its actions happen in coordination with other members of the CrRLK family, most of which have yet to be described let alone given a proven mechanism.

=== Sensing changes ===
Theseus1 is commonly believed to be able to detect changes in the cell wall and respond to perturbations. This thought has been applied to a few different scenarios. First, it has been considered that THE1 detects fragments of cell walls, and then signals for the inhibition of cell elongation. Another proposition is that THE1 responds to changes in the cell wall composition before signalling for the inhibition of cell elongation. Both fragmentation and alternate composition of the cell wall are commonly due to the presence of pathogens. The final commonly supported idea is that THE1 could just directly identify the presence of pathogens themselves though the use of its ML domain-like regions. All of these ideas support the theory that THE1 is part of the cell's response to pathogenic activity. Also, THE1 has been shown to upregulate the same genes that are regulated by pattern recognition receptors (PRRs) and code for defense-related proteins, which further suggests that THE1 plays a role in pathogenic response

=== Cellular elongation ===
Theseus1 and other members of the CrRLK family are important to cellular elongation. In particular, Theseus1 and Hercules1 (HERK1) have shown to perform similar roles in the process of elongation. Arabidopsis thaliana plants with a loss-of-function mutation to only one of these proteins will maintain a similar growth rate to the wild-type plant. However, if both proteins are mutated, the plant displays a greatly inhibited growth rate. Though the specific mechanism that causes this is unknown, it can be seen that these proteins are redundant but necessary for regular vegetative growth. Additionally, both THE1 and HERK1 function in coordination with the brassinosteroid pathway with a slight regulatory overlap between the two.

=== Regulation ===
Theseus1 has been shown to regulate cell elongation in response to decreased cellulose synthesis. The most commonly described example of this is in coordination with the procuste1 mutant for decreased cellulose synthase activity (prc1-1). When prc1-1 is present, THE1 greatly inhibits cellular elongation; however, when a less-functional mutant of theseus1 was used in combination with prc1-1, the growth rate increased to somewhere between the natural growth rate and the THE1 repressed growth rate. This shows that while a cell is able to expand further with decreased cellulose levels, THE1 represses elongation because of the change in the rate of cellulose production. This is also thought to be another method of pathogenic response, as some pathogens inhibit cellulose production.
