= Thésée =

Thésée means Theseus in French.

Thésée may also refer to:

== Operas ==
- Thésée (Lully)
- Thésée (Mondonville)
- Thésée (Gossec)

== Places ==
- Thésée, Loir-et-Cher

== People ==
- Lucie Thésée, a surrealist poet from the Antilles

== Others ==
- French ship Thésée (1790)

== See also ==
- Theseus (disambiguation)
- Teseo (disambiguation)
