= Teseo (disambiguation) =

Teseo is an opera seria by George Frideric Handel, and means Theseus in Italian or Spanish.

Teseo may also refer to:

== People ==
- Teseo de Cupis, a Roman Catholic prelate, Bishop of Macerata and Bishop of Recanati
- Teseo Ambrogio degli Albonesi, an Italian humanist
- Teseo Taddia, an Italian hammer thrower
- Teseo Tesei, an Italian naval officer

== Others ==
- Teseo (missile), an anti-ship and coastal defence missile
- TESEO (Tecnica Empirica Stima Errori Operatori)

== See also ==
- Theseus (disambiguation)
- Thésée (disambiguation)
