= Euroglyphus maynei =

Scientific classification
- Kingdom: Animalia
- Phylum: Arthropoda
- Subphylum: Chelicerata
- Class: Arachnida
- Order: Sarcoptiformes
- Family: Pyroglyphidae
- Genus: Euroglyphus
- Species: E. maynei

Binomial name
- Euroglyphus maynei (Cooreman, 1950)

Synonyms
- Mealia maynei Cooreman, 1950

Species of mite

Euroglyphus maynei, or Mayne's house dust mite, is a species of house dust mite in the family Pyroglyphidae.

== Taxonomy ==
The species Euroglyphus maynei was first described in 1950 by the Belgian acarologist Jean Cooreman (1911–1983), under the original name Mealia maynei.

It is found throughout the world.

== Original publication ==
- Cooreman, Jean (1950). "Sur un acarien nouveau, préjudiciable aux matières alimentaires entreposées: Mealia maynéi n. sp." Bulletin & Annales de la Société entomologique de Belgique. 86: 164–168.

== See also ==
- Dust mite allergy
- House dust mite
