= Oral mite anaphylaxis =

Disease caused by eating food contaminated with mites

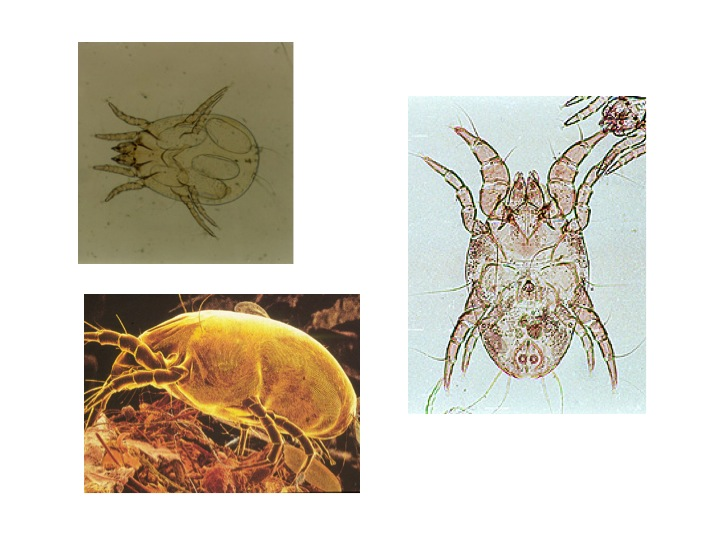
House dust mites

Oral mite anaphylaxis (OMA), also known as pancake syndrome, is a severe allergic reaction triggered by the ingestion of food contaminated with specific mites. The condition is associated with the consumption of wheat or maize flour that has been improperly stored in humid environments, leading to mite infestation. Symptoms can range from mild allergic reactions to severe anaphylaxis, often occurring shortly after ingestion of contaminated food. The disease name comes from reports of people becoming ill after eating pancakes made from contaminated wheat or corn (maize) flour.

== Signs and symptoms ==
Oral mite anaphylaxis (OMA) typically presents with acute allergic symptoms emerging within 10 to 240 minutes following the consumption of mite-contaminated flour. These symptoms affect multiple organ systems, often progressing rapidly. Respiratory manifestations are common and may include stridor, wheezing, sneezing, and nasal obstruction, which can worsen over time. Angioedema involving the lips, face, and larynx may also develop, posing a risk of airway obstruction. Cutaneous symptoms such as hives, erythema, and pruritus frequently occur, further indicating an allergic reaction. In severe cases, systemic involvement can lead to hypotension, tachycardia, dizziness, and loss of consciousness, potentially resulting in fatal outcomes. Due to the rapid onset and severity of OMA, prompt recognition and immediate intervention are critical in preventing life-threatening complications.

== Diagnosis ==
The diagnosis of OMA includes the following criteria.

- Presence of symptoms after consuming foods made with wheat flour
- Personal history of allergic rhinitis, asthma, eczema or food allergies
- Evidence of IgE-mediated reaction to mite allergens
- Positive immediate skin test to the suspected flour
- Negative skin test and tolerance to uncontaminated flour samples
- Evidence of mite allergens in the contaminated flour samples
- Coexisting hypersensitivity to nonsteroidal anti-inflammatory drugs (NSAIDs)

== Pathophysiology ==
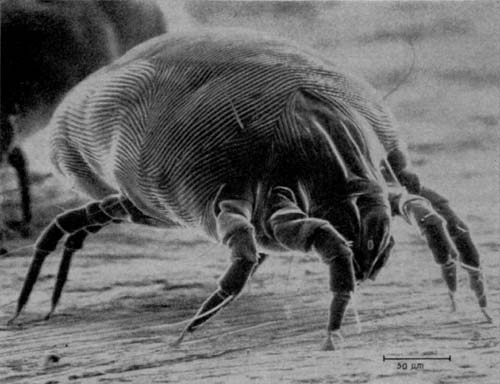
A house dust mite

This rare but serious allergic reaction happens when people consume food contaminated with specific mite species. The specific mites suspected as causing the condition are Dermatophagoides pteronyssinus, Blomia tropicalis, and Suidasia pontifica (Suidasia medanensis). The latter two are the most likely to have caused the harmful effects, and they live in tropical and subtropical environments. It has also been proposed that the allergens responsible for the allergic reaction are highly resistant to heat and this allows them to survive the cooking process. It is believed that the underlying pathophysiology is mediated by immunoglobulin E (IgE)-dependent hypersensitivity, where individuals previously sensitized to mite allergens experience systemic allergic reactions upon ingestion.

== Risk factors ==
Several risk factors have been identified for the development of oral mite anaphylaxis (OMA). These include individuals with a history of atopic conditions such as asthma, allergic rhinitis, or eczema and it is thought that this is due to their immune systems tendency to overreact to allergens. Additionally, it also tends to affect individuals with a preexisting allergy to mites. Researchers have also shown that there is a link between NSAID hypersensitivity and OMA, although the exact mechanism remains unclear. Studies also suggest that consuming more than 1 mg of mite allergens, or roughly 500 mites per gram of flour, also raises the likelihood of a severe allergic reaction.

== Treatment and prevention ==
Treating oral mite anaphylaxis starts with managing the immediate allergic reaction. This includes giving intramuscular epinephrine, bronchodilators, antihistamines and steroids to help control symptoms. Once the acute episode is treated, the focus shifts to prevention.

Preventing OMA comes down to food storage, hygiene practices, and allergy treatment in some cases. To prevent the growth of mites, it is recommended to store flour and other dry goods in refrigerated, frozen, or airtight containers. Additionally, it is also recommended to clean the storage space periodically and discard expired or improperly stored flour. For more severe cases, subcutaneous immunotherapy (SCIT) has been explored although results have been shown to vary from person to person.

== Oral mite anaphylaxis and NSAID hypersensitivity ==
There are numerous studies that have shown a connection between oral mite anaphylaxis (OMA) and hypersensitivity to nonsteroidal anti-inflammatory drugs (NSAIDs). People with OMA often report reactions mainly cutaneous to NSAIDs as well, suggesting a possible shared mechanism. Although the exact mechanism is still unknown, a possible explanation is that both conditions involve increased activation of mast cells and higher production of leukotrienes, which play a role in inflammation and allergic reactions.
