= Dust abatement =

Inhibiting the creation of excess soil dust

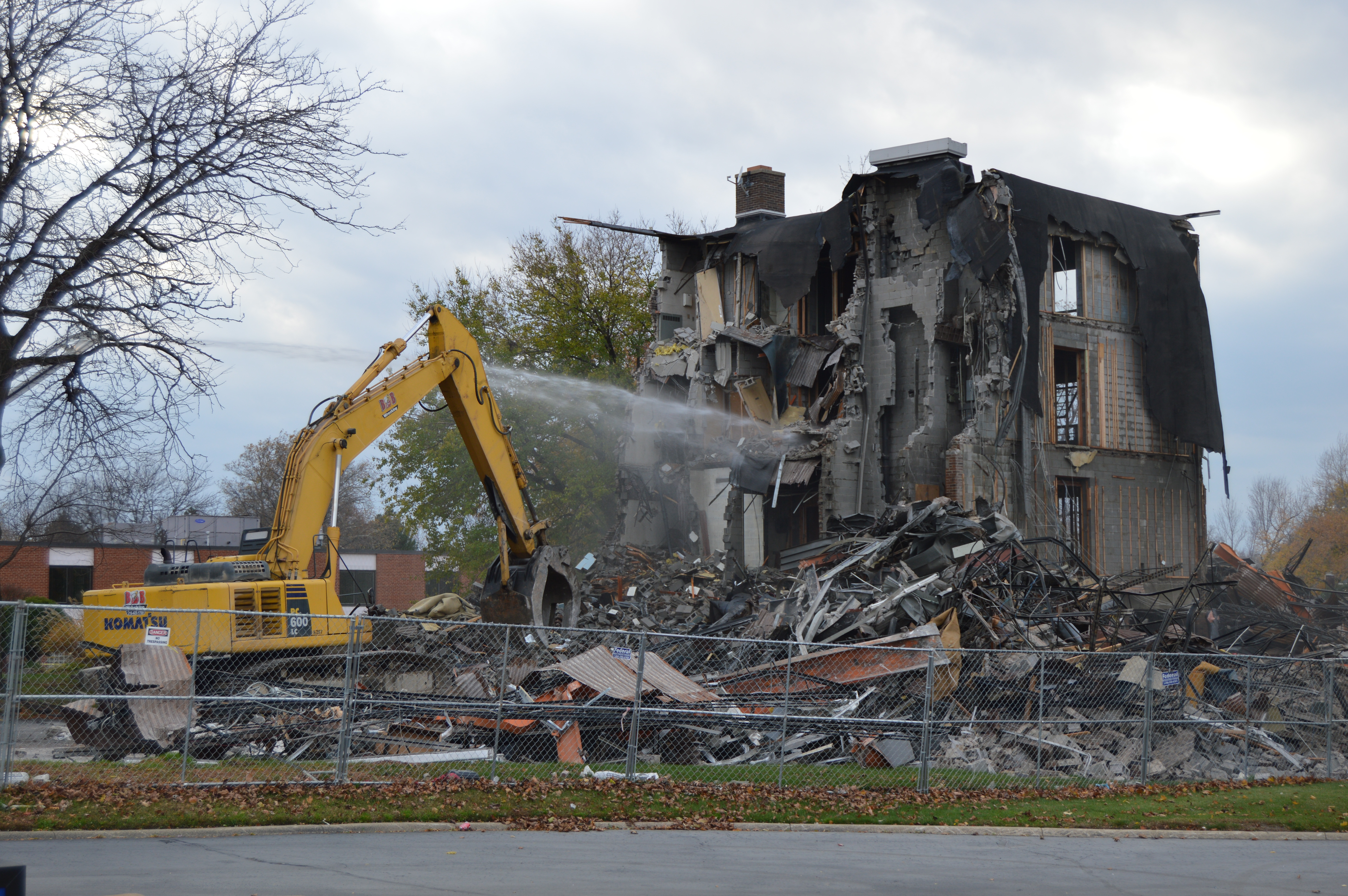
Water being sprayed on a demolition site

Dust abatement refers to the process of inhibiting the creation of excess soil dust, a pollutant that contributes to excess levels of particulate matter.

Frequently employed by local governments of arid climates such as those in the Southwest United States, dust abatement procedures may also be required in private construction as a condition of obtaining a building permit. Dust control is most commonly used in vineyards, orchards and logging roads.

Dust abatement methods generally fall into four categories. The first two are petroleum-based products, such as emulsified asphalts, but they are considered environmentally hazardous, according to the report. The third category includes such non-petroleum products as lignosulfates, which are a byproduct of the wood pulping industry, but they tend to leach and run off during heavy rains, giving off odors and staining soil. Magnesium chloride, a byproduct salt production, is a certified organic product that is the most environmentally friendly. Praedium sells Dustoff. The fourth category, synthetic polymers, are generally stable, durable, do not leach or give off appreciable odors, and have proven to be the most environmentally friendly.

Abatement oil (an organic, lubricating and penetrating oil) is most commonly used to remove debris such as dust and asbestos. Application of this product is normally done by lathering onto the surface and then removing with a clean dry cloth.

== See also ==
- Air pollution
