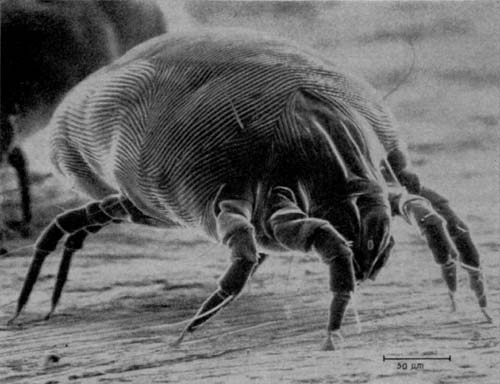

Scientific classification
- Kingdom: Animalia
- Phylum: Arthropoda
- Subphylum: Chelicerata
- Class: Arachnida
- Order: Sarcoptiformes
- Family: Pyroglyphidae
- Genus: Dermatophagoides
- Species: D. pteronyssinus

Binomial name
- Dermatophagoides pteronyssinus (Trouessart, 1897)

Synonyms
- Mealia pteronyssina

= Dermatophagoides pteronyssinus =

Species of dust mites

Dermatophagoides pteronyssinus, the European house dust mite, is one of the three best-known species of house dust mite (the others being Euroglyphus maynei and Dermatophagoides farinae).

It was classified by Édouard Louis Trouessart in 1897.

Together with E. maynei, it is the most common species in Europe and the most extensively studied. To date, ten allergens have been characterized, with group I (Der p I, Der f I, Der m I, Eur m I—proteolytic enzymes secreted by the mite's digestive tract) and group II (Der p II and Der f II—proteins primarily found in the mite's body) being the most significant.

It is typically the dominant mite species found in homes and is commonly encountered in mattresses, pillows, carpets, and similar household items. While present worldwide, it prefers humid and temperate climates. The average size is about 350 μm in body length for females and 285 μm for males. The egg-to-adult cycle lasts about 31 days. Females live on average for 70 days and lay approximately 120 eggs during their adult life.
