= Dust mite allergy =

- Other names: House dust allergy
- Specialty: Allergist, immunologist
- Symptoms: Symptoms
- Complications: Bronchial asthma, allergic asthma, allergic rhinitis
- Usual onset: Early childhood
- Causes: Mite droppings
- Prevention: Avoid dust mites or cutting down mite numbers
- Treatment: Allergen immunotherapy
- Medication: Allergy shots (SCIT), HDM-SLIT tablet (SLIT)

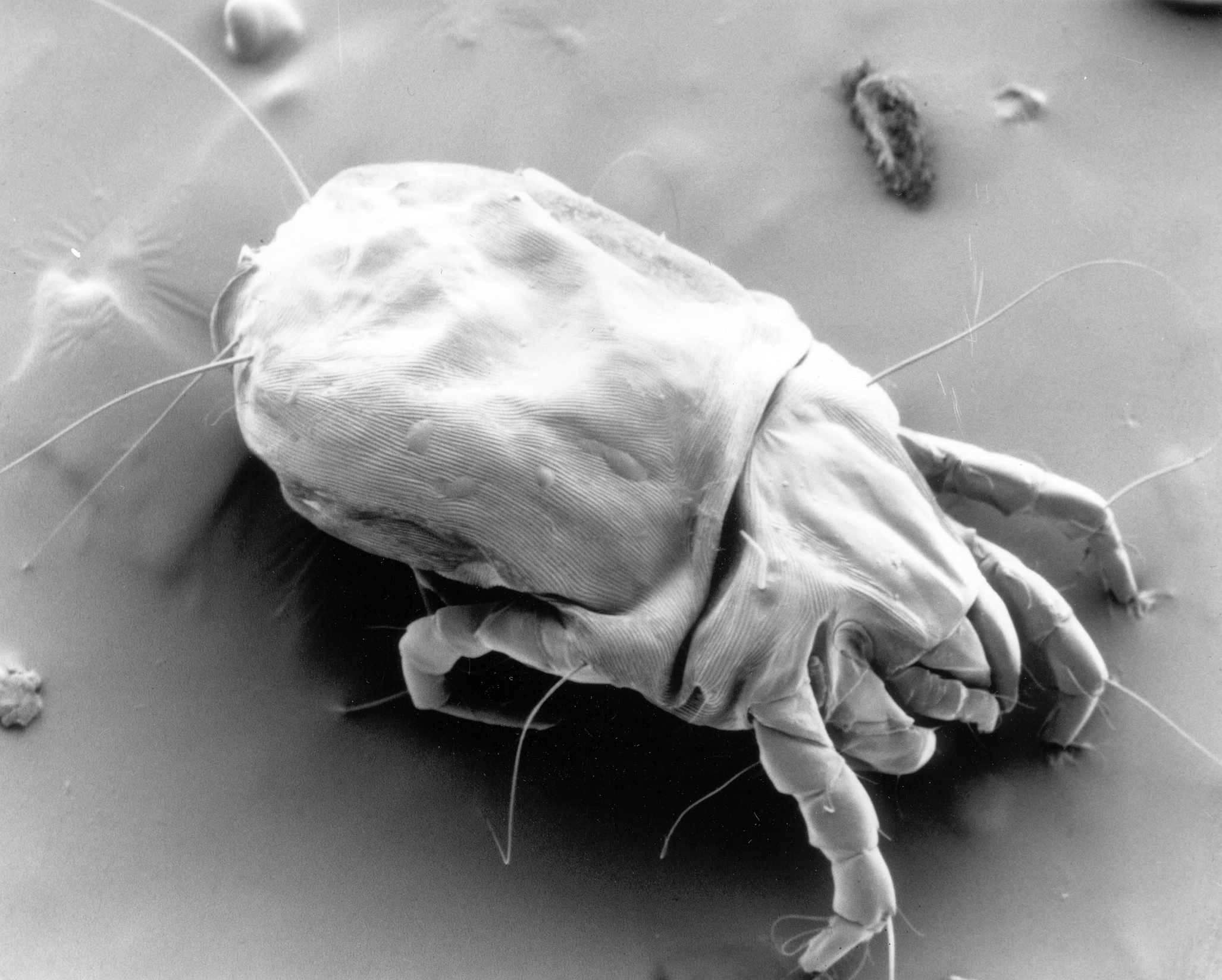
A scanning electron micrograph of a female dust mite

Dust mite allergy, also known as house dust allergy, is a sensitization and allergic reaction to the droppings of house dust mites. The allergy is common and can trigger allergic reactions such as asthma, eczema or itching. The mite's gut contains potent digestive enzymes (notably peptidase 1) that persist in their feces and are major inducers of allergic reactions such as wheezing. The mite's exoskeleton can also contribute to allergic reactions. Unlike scabies mites or skin follicle mites, house dust mites do not burrow under the skin and are not parasitic.

The symptoms can be avoided or alleviated by a number of measures. In general, cutting down mite numbers may reduce these reactions while others say efforts to remove these mites from the environment have not been found to be effective. Immunotherapy may be useful in those affected. Subcutaneous injections have better evidence than under the tongue dosing. Topical steroids as nasal spray or inhalation may be used.

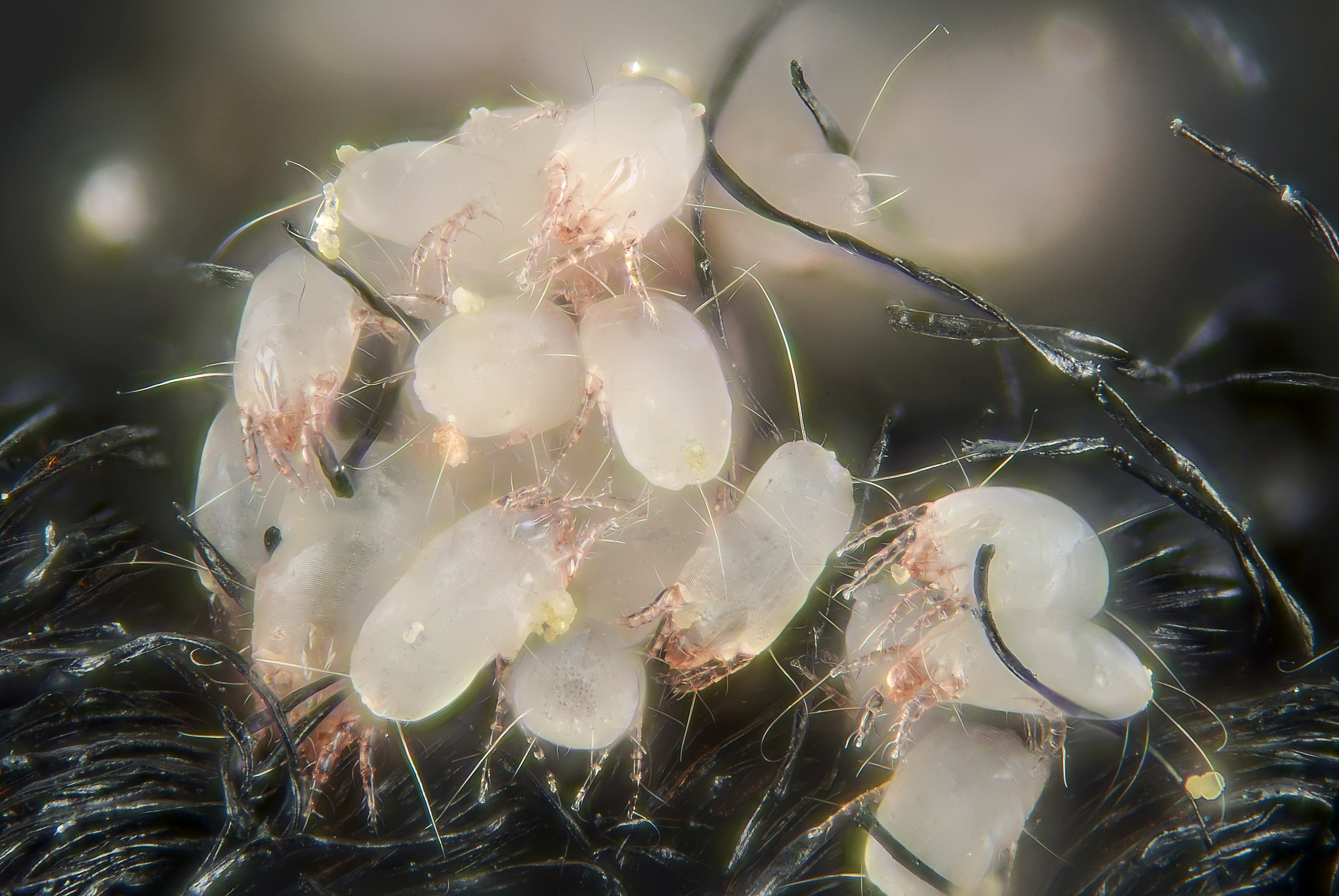
House dust mites (Dermatophagoides pteronyssinus) aggregate.

Severe dust mite infestation in the home has been linked to atopic dermatitis, and epidermal barrier damage has been documented.

== Symptoms ==
Dust mite allergy symptoms include:

- Cough
- Facial pressure and pain
- Itchy, red or watery eyes
- Itchy nose, roof of the mouth or throat
- Nasal congestion
- Postnasal drip
- Runny nose, sneezing
- Swollen, blue-colored skin under the eyes

If the dust mite allergy contributes to asthma:

- Audible whistling or wheezing sound when exhaling
- Bouts of coughing or wheezing that are worsened by a respiratory virus such as a cold or the flu
- Chest tightness or pain
- Difficulty breathing
- Trouble sleeping caused by shortness of breath, coughing or wheezing

== Cross-reactivity to shellfish allergy ==
Tropomyosin, a minor allergen in dust mites, is also responsible for shellfish allergy. Exposure to inhaled tropomyosins from dust mites is thought to be the primary sensitizer for shellfish allergy, an example of inhalant-to-food cross-reactivity. Epidemiological surveys have confirmed correlation between shellfish and dust mite sensitizations.

An additional confirmation was seen in Orthodox Jews with no history of shellfish consumption, in that skin tests confirming dust mite allergy were also positive for shellfish tropomyosin. In addition to tropomyosin, the proteins arginine kinase and hemocyanin seem to have a role in cross-reactivity to dust mites.

== Prevention ==
House dust mites are present indoors wherever humans live. Positive tests for dust mite allergies are extremely common among people with asthma. Dust mites are microscopic arachnids whose primary food is dead human skin cells, but they do not live on living people. They and their feces and other allergens are major constituents of house dust, but because they are so heavy they are not suspended for long in the air. They are generally found on the floor and other surfaces until disturbed (by walking, for example). It could take between twenty minutes and two hours for dust to settle back out of the air.

Dust mites are a nesting species that prefer a dark, warm, and humid climate. They flourish in mattresses, bedding, upholstered furniture, and carpets. Their feces include enzymes that are released upon contact with a moist surface, which can happen when a person inhales, and these enzymes can kill cells within the human body. House dust mites did not become a problem until humans began to use textiles, such as blankets and clothing.

=== Furniture ===
Furniture with wooden or leather surfaces reduces the dust mite population.

=== Bed linen ===
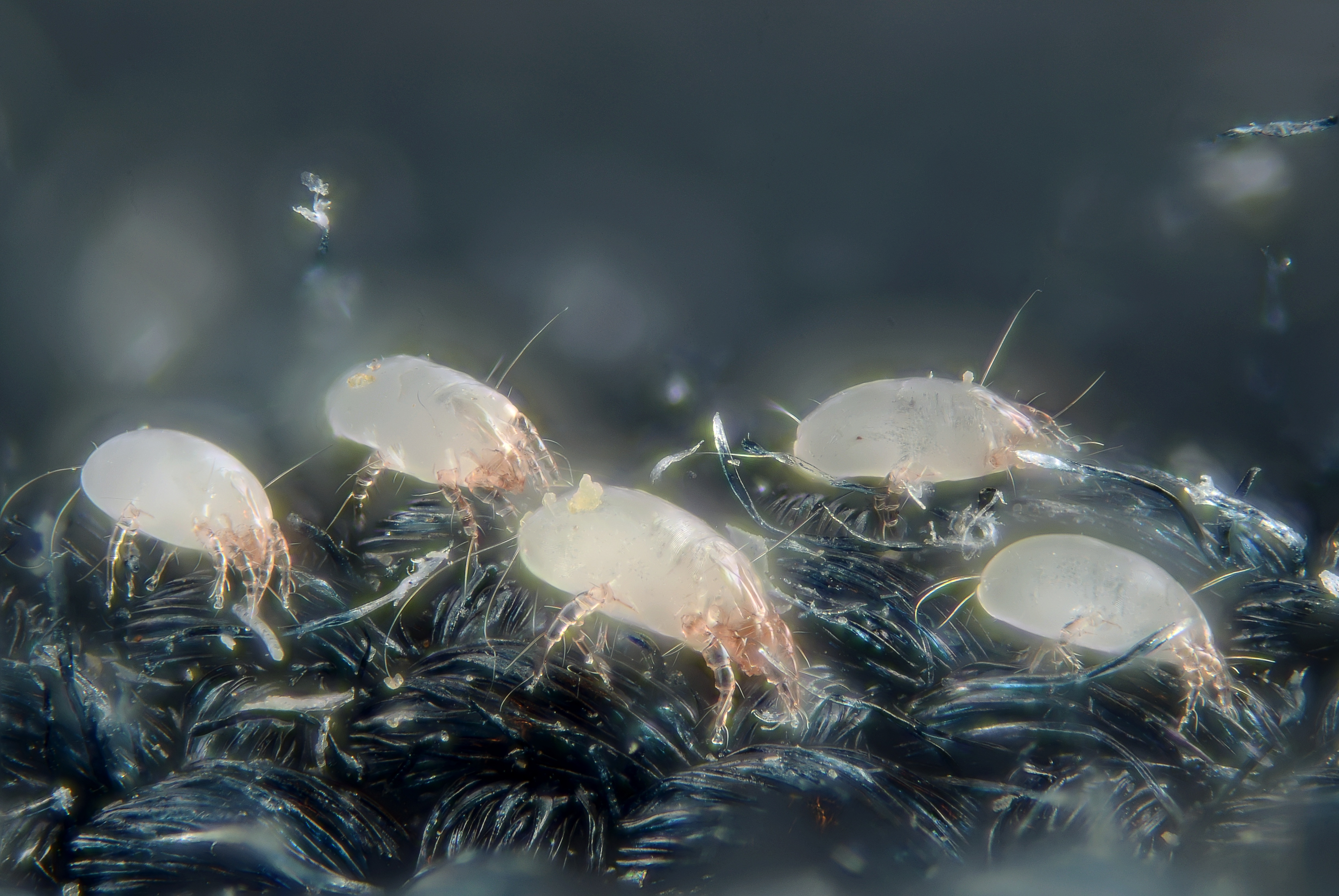
Dust mite-proof encasements to mattress, pillow, and duvet prevent chronic contact with allergens.

Hot tumble drying a bed linen for 1 hour will kill 99% of mites therein. Weekly changing the bed linen reduces the risk of exposure to dust mites. Cotton covers not covered with complete mattress covers are very likely to become colonized by bacteria and molds; they must be cleaned periodically (at least every second to third month). Here, the dust mites are beneficial as they return cotton to its original state after it has degraded by contact with bare skin.

Dust mite eggs are freeze tolerant (−70 °C for 30 minutes); hatching can normally be prevented by exposure of fabrics to:

- Direct sunlight for 3 hours or
- Dry or wet heat of at least 60 °C (140 °F) for a minimum of 30 minutes.

Dust mites drown in water.

Good properties of anti-mite fabrics have been identified as being:

- Thread count greater than 246.
- Pore size of between 2 and 10 micrometres. This will prevent dust mite faecal pellets that can be small as 10 μm.
- Allergen impenetrability >99%.
- Dust leakage of less than 4%.
- Breathability between 2 and 6 cm^{3} s^{−1} cm^{−2}.

=== Indoor climate ===
Allergy patients are advised to keep the relative humidity below 50%, if possible. Very few mites can survive if the humidity is less than 45% (at 22 °C (72 °F)). However, they can survive if the humidity is high just for an hour and a half per day, for example due to moisture released to the air when cooking food.

== Diagnosis ==
A key point of allergy diagnosis is establishing a link between exposure to the allergen and allergic symptoms. In the case of house dust mite allergy, identifying the trigger may be difficult. If the clinical history suggests an allergy, skin prick tests (SPT) with house dust mite extracts are typically performed to confirm sensitization. In routine practice, patients undergo SPT with D. pteronyssinus and D. farinae extracts. However, some proteins are underrepresented in the extracts, so not all patients can be effectively diagnosed with an allergy. So far, in the case of house dust mite, Der p 1, Der p 2, and Der p 23 are recognised as major allergens. The prevalence of sensitisation to Der p 4, Der p 5, Der p 7, Der p 10, Der p 11, Der p 20, and Der p 21 is below 50%, so these proteins are classified as minor HDM allergens. Der p 23, one of the major allergens, is present in extracts only in trace amounts. There is now another tool that can help establish a diagnosis in patients with allergy symptoms and negative skin test results: component-resolved diagnostics (CRD). CRD provides a more detailed analysis of an individual sensitisation pattern.

== Treatment ==
=== Allergen immunotherapy ===
Allergen immunotherapy (AIT, also known as desensitization or hypo-sensitization) is a treatment involved in administering the doses of allergens to accustom the body to substances that are generally harmless (pollen, house dust mites), thereby inducing specific long-term tolerance. Allergen immunotherapy is the only treatment that alters the disease mechanism. Immunotherapy can be administered orally (as sublingual tablets or sublingual drops), or by injections under the skin (subcutaneous). Subcutaneous immunotherapy is the most common form and has the largest body of evidence supporting its effectiveness.

==== Subcutaneous immunotherapy ====
Subcutaneous Immunotherapy (SCIT) also known as Allergy Shots are series of shots/injections of the allergen given into the fat under the skin that have progressively larger amounts of allergen. These shots can be given to children as young as 5 years old.

==== Sublingual immunotherapy (SLIT) ====
House dust mite allergen extract
Clinical data
- Trade names: Odactra, Acarizax, Miticure, others
- License data: US DailyMed: Dermatophagoides pteronyssinus
- Routes of administration: By mouth
- ATC code: None

Legal status
- Legal status: CA: ℞-only; US: ℞-only

HDM-SLIT tablet, House Dust Mites (Dermatophagoides farinae and Dermatophagoides pteronyssinus) Allergen Extract (brand names: Odactra, Acarizax, Miticure), is an allergen extract for the immunotherapic treatment of adolescents (12–17 years) and adults (18–65 years).

It treats house dust mite (HDM)-induced allergic rhinitis, with or without conjunctivitis. It has been approved in Japan, Russia, Southeast Asia, Turkey, the Middle East, New Zealand, and several European countries.

In February 2025, the indication for Odactra was expanded to include use in individuals aged five through eleven years of age to treat house dust mite induced nasal inflammation (allergic rhinitis), with or without eye inflammation (conjunctivitis). Odactra is an allergen extract immunotherapy that is administered under the tongue (sublingual) and had been approved for use in individuals aged 12 through 65 years of age. The FDA approved prescribing information includes a boxed warning to inform that Odactra can cause severe allergic reactions that may be life-threatening.
