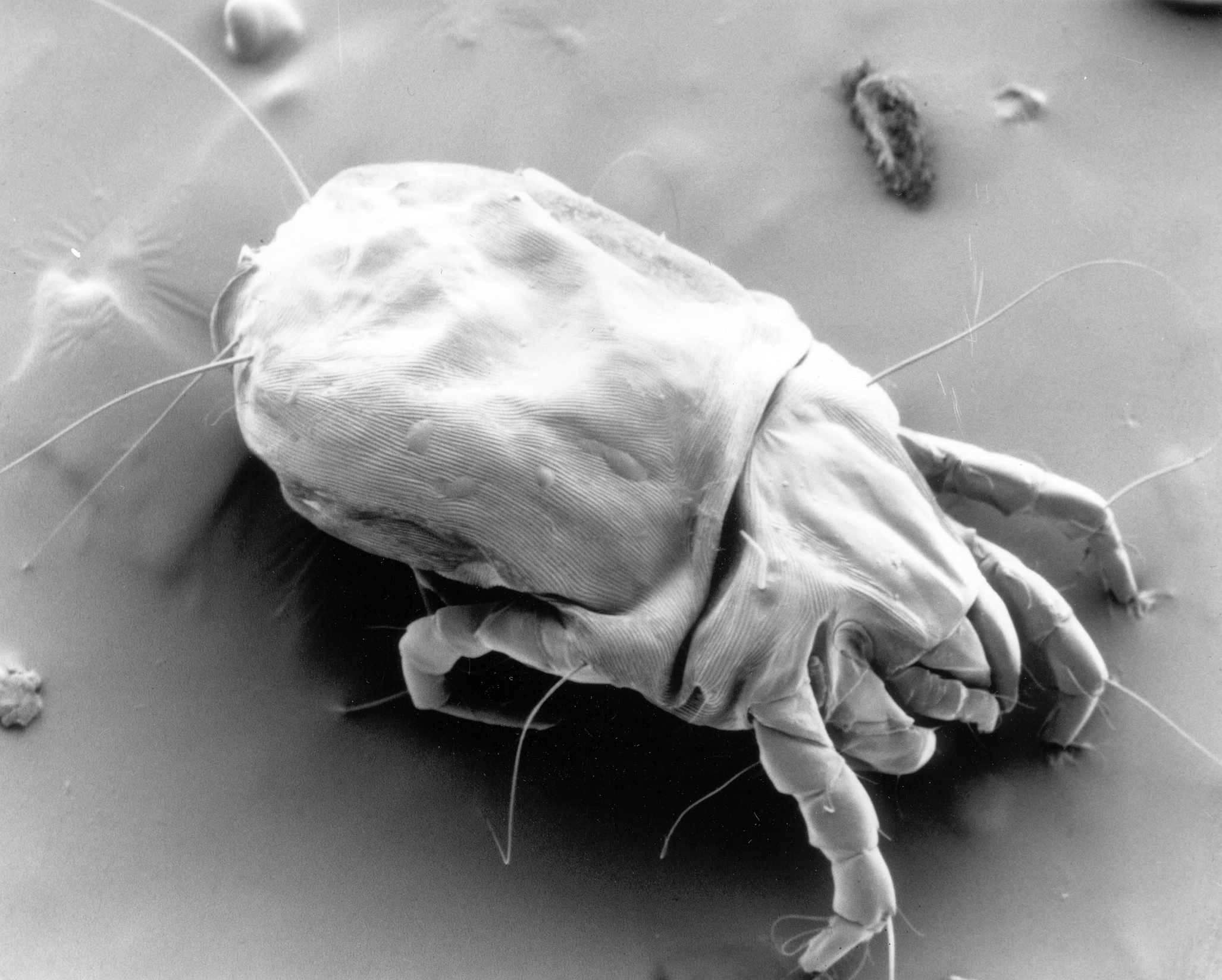
- Scanning electron micrograph of a female dust mite

Scientific classification
- Kingdom: Animalia
- Phylum: Arthropoda
- Subphylum: Chelicerata
- Class: Arachnida
- Order: Sarcoptiformes
- Superfamily: Pyroglyphoidea
- Family: Pyroglyphidae

Subfamilies
- Dermatophagoidinae; Onychalginae; Paralgopsinae; Pyroglyphinae; Pyroglyphidae incertae sedis; Euroglyphus; Marioglyphus; Tuccioglyphus

= Pyroglyphidae =

Family of mites

Pyroglyphidae is a family of non-parasitic mites. It includes the house dust mites that live in human dwellings, many species that live in the burrows and nests of other animals, and some pests of dried products stored in humid conditions.

== Etymology ==
The naming of the family originates from the fact that dust mites cause eczema, with intense itching and a red rash. The condition has been described as like burns from fire on the skin, with a 'burning' itching sensation, hence the word 'Pyro' in 'pyroglyphidae'.

== Characteristics ==
Mites in this family are very tiny; the female American house dust mite (Dermatophagoides farinae), for example, measures about 420 microns in length and 320 microns in width, with the male being somewhat narrower.

== Ecology ==
These mites mostly live in the nests and burrows of animals and birds where they feed on detritus from the skin and feathers of their hosts. They need a humid atmosphere because the air is their only source of moisture. They thrive when the relative humidity is greater than 50% but become desiccated and die at lower relative humidity levels. Other mites in this family feed on stored products such as grain, cereals, nuts, dried fruit, cheeses and pet foods, but only in conditions of high relative humidity.

The sexes are separate in this family. The female lays two or three eggs each day and these develop through several stages; larva, protonymph, trytonymph and adult. At 23 °C (73 °F), the complete cycle takes 34 days, but the length of time taken varies with the temperature and relative humidity. If the latter is very low, the protonymph can enter diapause, surviving for several months in a quiescent state until conditions improve, after which development recommences.

== House dust mites ==
Three species of house dust mite are commonly found in human dwellings; Dermatophagoides farinae, Dermatophagoides pteronyssinus and Euroglyphus maynei. They feed on flakes of skin found in dust and typically occur on carpets, around sofas and chairs, and on mattresses. They may be very plentiful in the humid tropics, but in temperate climates are more numerous in humid summers than in winters, when the relative humidity is usually lower in homes.

Some people suffer a reaction to allergens present in the faeces of house dust mites. These may cause atopic dermatitis or be inhaled giving rise to asthma or rhinitis.
