= House dust mite =

Common name for several species of mite

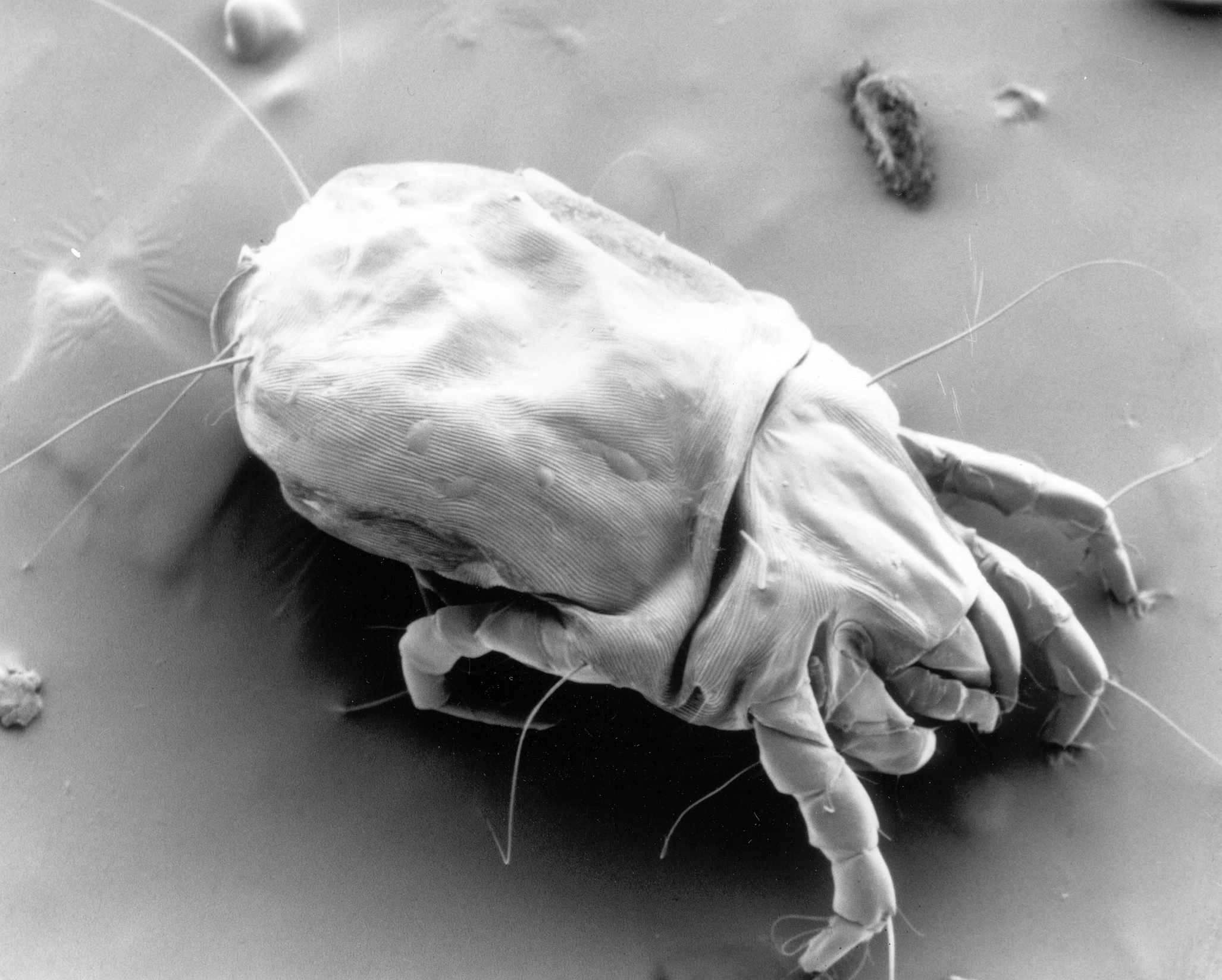
A scanning electron micrograph of a female dust mite

House dust mites (or simply dust mites) are various species of acariform mites belonging to the family Pyroglyphidae that are found in association with dust in dwellings. They are known for causing allergies.

== Biology ==
=== Species ===
The currently known species are:

- Blomia tropicalis
- Dermatophagoides farinae (American house dust mite)
- Dermatophagoides pteronyssinus (European house dust mite)
- Dermatophagoides evansi
- Dermatophagoides microceras
- Dermatophagoides halterophilus
- Dermatophagoides siboney
- Dermatophagoides neotropicalis
- Dermatophagoides alexfaini
- Dermatophagoides anisopoda
- Dermatophagoides chirovi
- Dermatophagoides deanei
- Dermatophagoides rwandae
- Dermatophagoides scheremeteroskyi
- Dermatophagoides scheremetewskyi
- Dermatophagoides simplex
- Euroglyphus maynei (Mayne's house dust mite)
- Euroglyphus longior
- Hirstia domicola
- Malayoglyphus carmelitus
- Malayoglyphus intermedius
- Pyroglyphus africanus
- Sturnophagoides brasiliensis
- Suidasia pontifica

=== Taxonomy ===
The dust mites are cosmopolitan members of the mite family Pyroglyphidae.

=== Characteristics ===
House dust mites, due to their very small size and translucent bodies, are barely visible to the unaided eye. A typical house dust mite measures 0.2–0.3 mm in length. The body of the house dust mite has a striated cuticle.

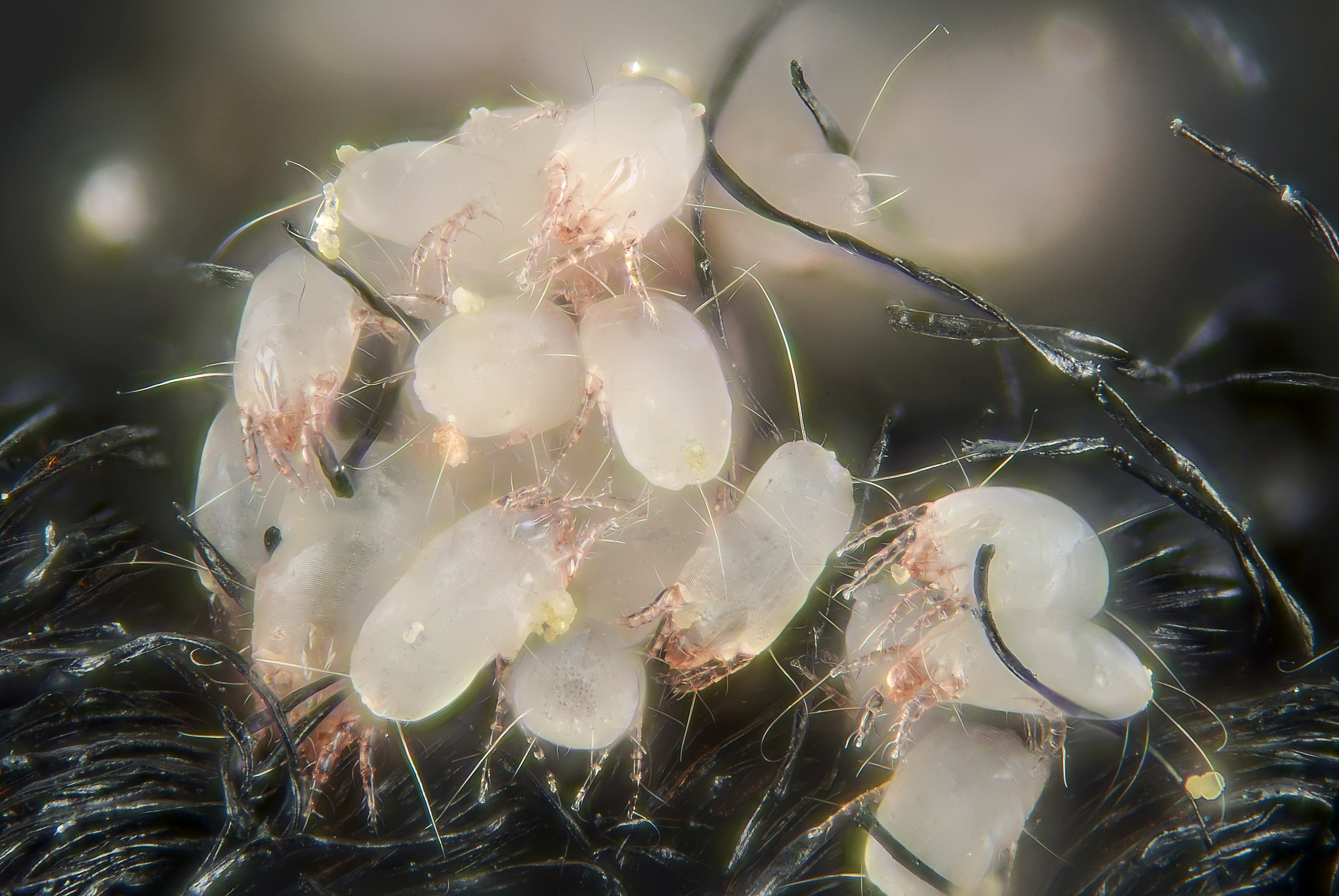
Dermatophagoides pteronyssinus Dust mite faecal pellets can be as small as 10 μm

House dust mite faecal pellets range from 10 to 40 μm; they can be contained by anti-mite fabrics of a denser pore size.

=== Diet ===
Dust mites feed on skin flakes from humans and other animals, and on some mold. Dermatophagoides farinae fungal food choices in 16 tested species commonly found in homes was observed in vitro to be Alternaria alternata, Cladosporium sphaerospermum, and Wallemia sebi, and they disliked Penicillium chrysogenum, Aspergillus versicolor, and Stachybotrys chartarum.

=== Predators ===
Dust mites are preyed upon by other allergenic mites (Cheyletiella), silverfish, and pseudoscorpions.

=== Reproduction ===
The average life cycle for a house dust mite is 65–100 days. A mated female house dust mite can live up to 70 days, laying 60 to 100 eggs in the last five weeks of her life. In a 10-week life span, a house dust mite will produce approximately 2,000 fecal particles and an even larger number of partially digested enzyme-covered dust particles.

=== Distribution ===
Dust mites are found worldwide, but are more common in humid regions. The species Blomia tropicalis is typically found only in tropical or subtropical regions. Detectable dust mite allergen was found in the beds of about 84% of surveyed United States homes. In Europe, detectable Der p 1 or Der f 1 allergen was found in 68% of surveyed homes.

== Health issues ==
=== Asthma ===
House dust mite antigens are strongly associated with asthma development and severity; they are estimated to contribute to 60–90% of cases.

=== Allergies ===
House dust mites are found in almost all environments and are one of the most common causes of allergies. Patients allergic to dust mites most commonly develop allergic rhinitis, allergic asthma, and atopic dermatitis. The estimated prevalence of dust mite allergy ranges from 1% to 20% of the global population and can reach as high as 50% in atopic individuals.

Tropomyosin, the major allergen in dust mites, is also responsible for shellfish allergy.

Because house dust mites and their faecal allergens accumulate primarily in mattresses, bedding, upholstered furniture, and carpets where shed human skin cells and moisture collect, environmental control measures include reducing indoor humidity, using allergen-impermeable covers, and deep-cleaning soft furnishings with HEPA-filtered or water-filtration vacuum systems equipped with motorized beater brushes to extract deeply embedded mites and prevent airborne resuspension.

=== Oral mite anaphylaxis ===
Dermatophagoides spp. can cause oral mite anaphylaxis, a.k.a. pancake syndrome, when found in flour.
