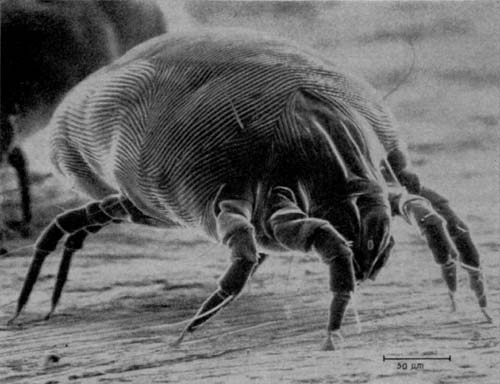
- Dermatophagoides pteronyssinus

Scientific classification
- Kingdom: Animalia
- Phylum: Arthropoda
- Subphylum: Chelicerata
- Class: Arachnida
- Order: Sarcoptiformes
- Family: Pyroglyphidae
- Genus: Dermatophagoides; A.Bogdanov, 1864

Synonyms
- Hullia Gaud, 1968; Maelia Michael, 1901; Mealia Trouessart, 1897; Pachylichus Canestrini, 1894; Pachylicus Canestrini, 1894; Paralgoides Gaud & Mouchet, 1959; Visceroptes Sasa, 1947

= Dermatophagoides =

Genus of arachnids

Dermatophagoides is a genus of mites in the family Pyroglyphidae.

Six species are accepted in this genus:

- Dermatophagoides evansi Fain, Hughes & Johnston, 1967
- Dermatophagoides farinae A.M.Hughes, 1961
- Dermatophagoides microceras D.A.Griffiths & Cunnington, 1971
- Dermatophagoides passericola Fain
- Dermatophagoides pteronyssinus (Trouessart, 1897)
- Dermatophagoides scheremetewskyi Bogdanow, 1864, type species
