= Dermatophagoides farinae =

Scientific classification
- Kingdom: Animalia
- Phylum: Arthropoda
- Subphylum: Chelicerata
- Class: Arachnida
- Order: Sarcoptiformes
- Family: Pyroglyphidae
- Genus: Dermatophagoides
- Species: D. farinae

Binomial name
- Dermatophagoides farinae Hughes, 1961

Species of dust mites

Dermatophagoides farinae, the American house dust mite, is one of the best-known species of house dust mite.

Dermatophagoides farinae is, after Dermatophagoides pteronyssinus, the most common species of house dust mite. The two species coexist in the same habitat, but their relative proportions vary by region. D. farinae is found worldwide, but is more abundant in North America than in Europe. It is common in arid, continental areas, and the prevalence of allergic reactions is extremely high in North America and Japan. However, large numbers of cases have also been found in parts of Italy and Turkey, and in the Far East outside Japan.

The male D. farinae measures 260 to 360 μm as an adult; the largest female reaches 360 to 400 μm. Its development takes 35 days, for a lifespan of about 70 days. The female lays approximately 80 eggs.

The species was described in 1961 by Agnes Margaret Hughes, who gave it the name farinae (Latin for “flour”) after the discovery of animal meal compounds in England.
