= Human parasite =

Parasites which use humans as a host

Human parasites are divided into endoparasites, which cause infection inside the body, and ectoparasites, which cause infection superficially within the skin. Parasites in general are hosts-dependent organisms that obtain nutrients while potentially harming their host in the process.

Parasitic infections cause global health concerns because they impact billions of people throughout the world at different disease severity. These infections split into the three main categories of protozoa and helminths (parasitic worms) alongside ectoparasites. Over 30% of global human population is affected by the roundworm "Ascaris lumbricoides". The incidence of certain parasitic diseases including malaria and schistosomiasis continue to rise year after year. The AIDS epidemic has worsened the situation by causing elevated rates of parasitic opportunistic infections to affect mainly weak-immune people through conditions such as cryptosporidiosis, Pneumocystis pneumonia and strongyloidiasis. Refugees and infected people moving between high-prevalence regions cause an increase in parasitic diseases to appear in places that were previously free from these infections. Public health system must develop improved strategies, as parasitic diseases continue to pose a persistent challenge to global health.

The cysts and eggs of endoparasites may be found in feces, which aids in the detection of the parasite in the human host while also providing the means for the parasitic species to exit the current host and enter other hosts. Although there are a number of ways in which humans can contract parasitic infections, observing basic hygiene and cleanliness tips can reduce its probability.

== History ==
=== Archaeological evidence ===
It was assumed that early human ancestors generally had parasites, but until recently there was no evidence to support this claim. Generally, the discovery of parasites in ancient humans relies on the study of feces and other fossilized material. The earliest known parasite in a human was eggs of the lung fluke found in fossilized feces in northern Chile and is estimated to be from around 5900 BC. There are also claims of hookworm eggs from around 5000 BC in Brazil and large roundworm eggs from around 2330 BC in Peru. Tapeworm eggs have also been found present in Egyptian mummies dating from around 2000 BC, 1250 BC, and 1000 BC along with a well preserved and calcified female worm inside of a mummy.

=== Written evidence ===
The first written records of parasites date from 3000 to 400 BC in Egyptian papyrus records. They identify parasites such as roundworms, Guinea worms, threadworms, and some tapeworms of unknown varieties. In ancient Greece, Hippocrates and Aristotle documented several parasites in his collection of works Corpus Hippocraticus. In this book, they documented the presence of worms and other parasites inside of fish, domesticated animals, and humans. The bladder worm is well documented in its presence in pigs along with the larval stages of a tapeworm (Taenia solium). These tapeworms were mentioned in a play by Aristophanes as "hailstones" with Aristotle in the section about pig diseases in his book History of Animals. The cysts of the Echinococcus granulosus tapeworm were also well known in ancient cultures mainly because of their presence in slaughtered and sacrificed animals. The major parasitic disease that has been documented in early records is dracunculiasis. This disease is caused by the Guinea worm and is characterized by the female worm emerging from the leg. This symptom is so specific to the disease that it is mentioned in many texts and plays that predate 1000 AD.

==== Greece and Rome ====
In Greece, Hippocrates and Aristotle created considerable medical documentation about parasites in the Corpus Hippocraticus. In this work, they documented the presence of parasitic worms in many animals ranging from fish to domesticated animals and humans. Among the most extensively documented was the Bladder Worm (Taenia solium). This condition was called "measly pork" when present in pigs and was characterized by the presence of the larval stages of the Bladder Worm in muscle tissue. This disease was also mentioned by the playwright Aristophanes when he referred to "hailstones" in one of his plays. This naming convention is also reflected by Aristotle when he refers to "bladders that are like hailstones." Another worm that was commonly written about in ancient Greek texts was the tapeworm Echinococccus granulosus. This worm was distinguished by the presence of "massive cysts" in the liver of animals. This condition was documented so well mainly because of its presence in slaughtered and sacrificed animals. It was documented by several different cultures of the time other than the Greeks including the Arabs, Romans, and Babylonians. Not many parasitic diseases were identified in ancient Greek and Roman texts mainly because the symptoms for parasitic diseases are shared with many other illnesses such as the flu, the common cold, and dysentery. However, several diseases such as Dracunculiasis (Guinea worm disease), Hookworm, Elephantiasis, Schistosomiasis, Malaria, and Amebiasis cause unique and specific symptoms and are well documented because of this. The most documented by far was Guinea worm disease mainly because the grown female worm emerges from the skin, which causes considerable irritation, and which cannot really be ignored. This particular disease is widely accepted to also be the "fiery serpents" written about in the Old Testament of the Bible. This disease was mentioned by Hippocrates in Greece along with Pliny the Elder, Galen, Aetius of Amida, and Paulus Aegineta of Alexandria in Rome. Strangely, this disease was never present in Greece even though it was documented.

==== Northern Africa, the Middle East, and Mesopotamia ====
The medieval Persian doctor Avicenna records the presence of several parasites in animals and in his patients including Guinea worm, threadworms, tapeworms, and the Ascaris worm. This followed a tradition of Arab medical writings spanning over 1000 years in the area near the Red Sea. However, the Arabs never made the connection between parasites and the diseases they caused. As with Greek and Roman texts, the Guinea worm is very well documented in Middle Eastern medical texts. Several Assyrian documents in the library of King Ashurbanipal refer to an affliction that has been interpreted as Guinea worm disease. In Egypt, the Ebers Papyrus contains one of the few references to hookworm disease in ancient texts. This disease does not have very specific symptoms and was vaguely mentioned. However vague the reference, it is one of the few that connect the disease to the hookworm parasite. Another documented disease is elephantiasis. Symptoms of this disease are highly visible, since it causes extreme swelling in the limbs, breasts, and genitals. A number of surviving statues indicate that Pharaoh Mentuhotep II is likely to have suffered from elephantiasis. This disease was well known to Arab physicians and Avicenna, who noted specific differences between elephantiasis and leprosy.

==== China ====
The Chinese mostly documented diseases rather than the parasites associated with them. Chinese texts contain one of the few references to hookworm disease found in ancient records, but no connection to the hookworm parasite is made. The Emperor Huang Ti recorded the earliest mentioning (2700 BC) of malaria in his text Nei Ching. He lists chills, headaches, and fevers as the main symptoms and distinguished between the different kinds of fevers.

==== India ====
In India, the Charaka Samhita and Sushruta Samhita document malaria. These documents list the main symptoms as fever and enlarged spleens. The Bhrigu Samhita from 1000 BCE makes the earliest reference to Amebiasis. The symptoms were given as bloody and mucosal diarrhea.

== Most common parasites ==
As of 2013, the parasites causing the most deaths globally were as follows:

Parasitic Disease	Global Deaths in 2013
Malaria	854,600
Leishmaniasis (Kala-azar)	62,500
Cryptosporidiosis	41,900
Amoebiasis	11,300
Chagas disease	10,600
African trypanosomiasis	6,900
Schistosomiasis	5,500
Ascariasis	4,500
Cystic echinococcosis	2,200
Cysticercosis	700
Total Deaths from Parasitic Infections	1,000,700

== Commonly documented parasites ==
=== Endoparasites ===
==== Protozoa ====
- Plasmodium spp.: causes malaria
- Entamoeba: causes amoebiasis
- Giardia: causes giardiasis
- Trypanosoma brucei: causes African trypanosomiasis
- Toxoplasma gondii: causes toxoplasmosis
- Acanthamoeba: causes acanthamoeba keratitis
- Leishmania: causes leishmaniasis
- Babesia: causes babesiosis
- Balamuthia mandrillaris: causes granulomatous amoebic encephalitis
- Cryptosporidium: causes cryptosporidiosis
- Cyclospora cayetanensis: causes cyclosporiasis
- Naegleria fowleri: causes primary amoebic meningoencephalitis

==== Parasitic worms (helminths) ====
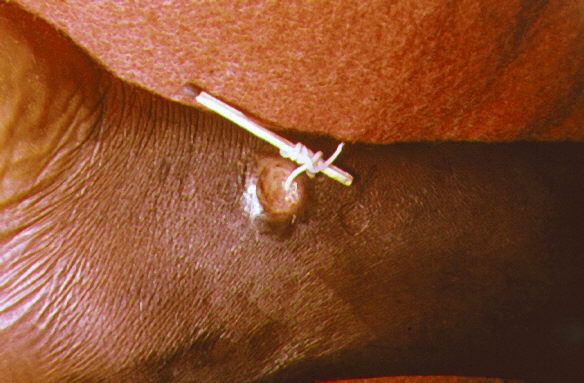
Guinea worm (Dracunculus) wrapped around a match stick

- Ascaris lumbricoides: causes ascariasis
- Pinworm: causes enterobiasis
- Strongyloides stercoralis: causes strongyloidiasis
- Toxocara: causes toxocariasis
- Guinea worm: causes dracunculiasis.
- Hookworm: causes helminthiasis
- Tapeworm (Eucestoda): causes cysticercosis, echinococcosis, hymenolepiasis, diphyllobothriasis and sparganosis
- Whipworm (Trichuris trichiura): causes trichuriasis

=== Parasitic flukes ===
- Schistosoma: causes schistosomiasis
- Gnathostoma: causes gnathostomiasis
- Paragonimus: causes paragonimiasis
- Fasciola hepatica: causes fascioliasis
- Trichobilharzia regenti: causes cercarial dermatitis

=== Other organisms ===
- New World screwworm (Cochliomyia): causes myiasis

=== Ectoparasites ===
- Head louse (Pediculus humanus capitis) causes pediculosis
- Body louse (Pediculus humanus humanus): causes pediculosis
- Crab louse (Pthirus pubis): causes phthiriasis
- Human botfly maggot (Dermatobia hominis): causes myiasis
- Flea (Siphonaptera): causes papular urticaria
- Chigoe flea (Tunga penetrans): causes tungiasis
- Mosquito (Culicidae): causes papular urticaria
- Bed bug (Cimex lectularius): causes papular urticaria
- Tick (Ixodoidea): causes papular urticaria
- Chiggers (Trombiculidae): causes trombiculosis
- Scabies mite (Sarcoptes scabiei): causes scabies
- Red mite (Dermanyssus gallinae): causes gamasoidosis
- Tropical fowl mite (Ornithonyssus bursa): causes gamasoidosis
- Northern fowl mite (Ornithonyssus sylviarum): causes gamasoidosis
- Tropical rat mite (Ornithonyssus bacoti): causes rodent mite dermatitis
- Spiny rat mite (Laelaps echidnina): causes rodent mite dermatitis
- House mouse mite (Liponyssoides sanguineus): causes rodent mite dermatitis
- Demodex mite: associated with acne vulgaris and rosacea
