= Heat pen =

Device to mitigate sting or bite effects

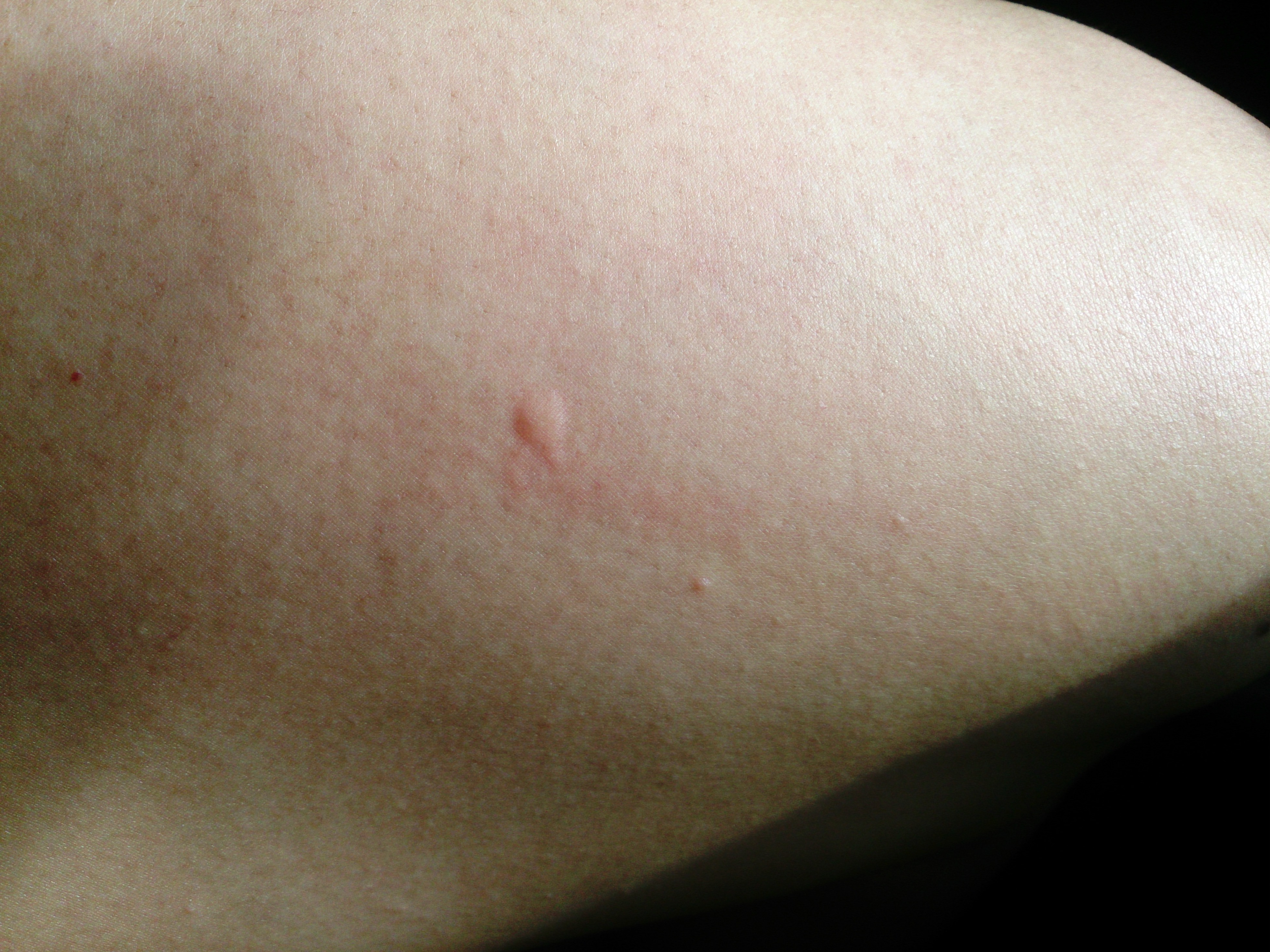
Mosquito bite

Heat pen in use

A heat pen (also known as a thermal stick) is a device used to mitigate the effects of an insect sting (e.g., wasp sting) or insect bite (e.g., mosquito bite) by briefly heating the skin.

== Shape ==
The heat pen is available either as a pen-like device or as a USB-attachment for the smartphone.

== Effect ==
A heat pen has a ceramic or metal plate at the tip, which heats to 50 to 60 °C. The heated plate is brought into contact with the area of skin affected by the insect bite for 3 to 10 seconds, causing the skin to briefly heat up to 53 °C (local hyperthermia). The heat activates various physiological processes. For example, it is assumed that the insect proteins are destroyed (denatured) and the body's histamine release is reduced. This results in symptom relief, for example itching is avoided. Due to the short application time, the skin is not damaged. The positive effect of the heat stick could be confirmed by a study, however employees of the manufacturer are the lead authors and may be biased.

The exact effect is not known; various mechanisms are discussed.

The same mode of action is also used to treat cold sores.
