= Arthropod assault =

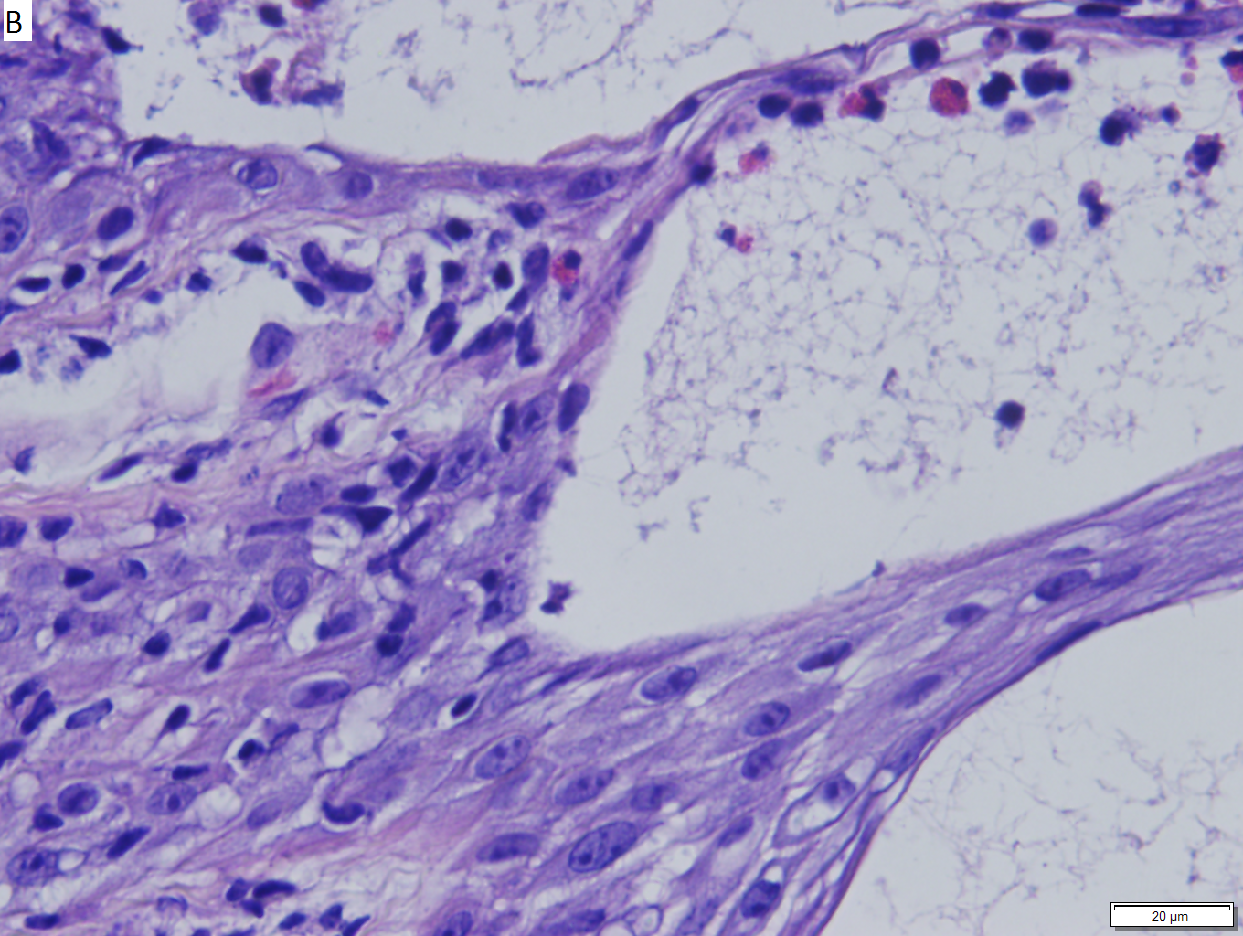
- Bullous arthropod assault
- Specialty: Dermatology

Arthropod assault is a medical term describing a skin reaction to an insect bite characterized by inflammation and eosinophilic response.

== See also ==
- Arthropod bites and stings
- List of cutaneous conditions
