= Arthropod bites and stings =

- Other names: Bug bite
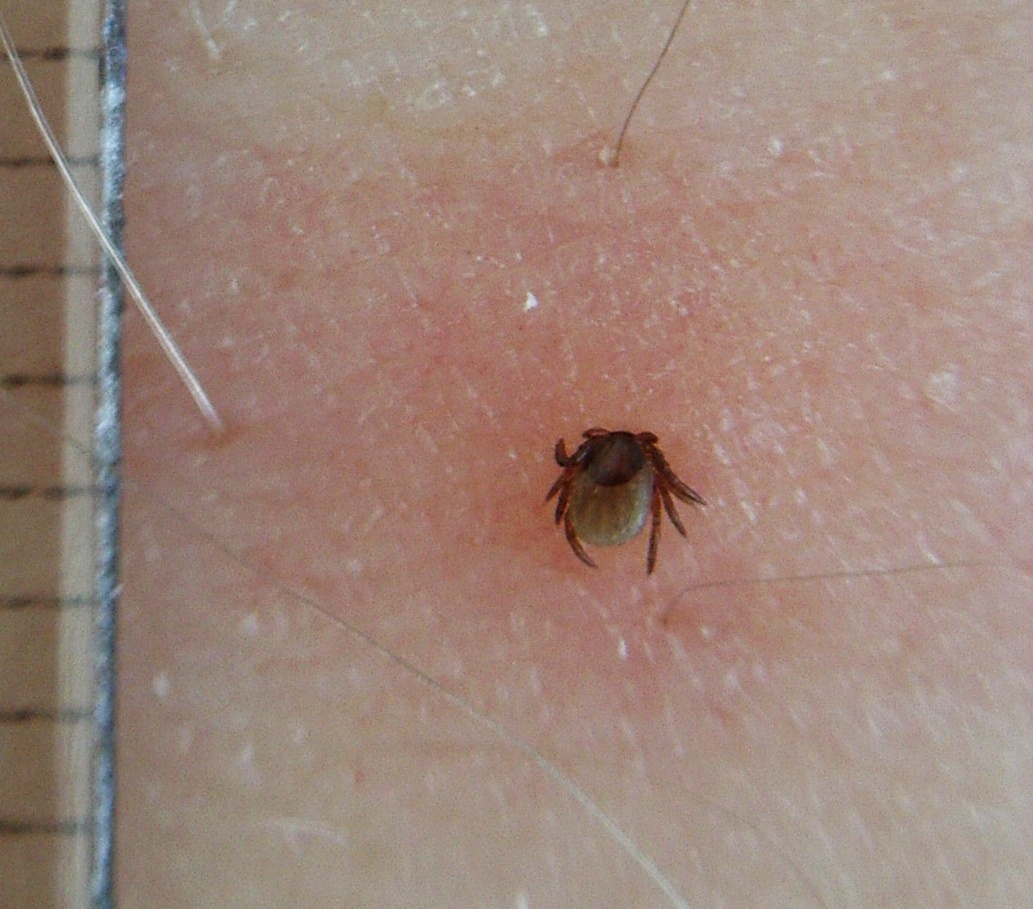
- Tick bite
- Specialty: Emergency medicine, infectious disease
- Symptoms: Swelling, itching, pain
- Complications: Anaphylaxis, envenomation, disease transmission

Many species of arthropods (insects, arachnids, millipedes and centipedes) can bite or sting human beings. These bites and stings generally occur as a defense mechanism or during normal arthropod feeding. While most cases cause self-limited irritation, medically relevant complications include envenomation, allergic reactions, and transmission of vector-borne diseases.

== Signs and symptoms ==
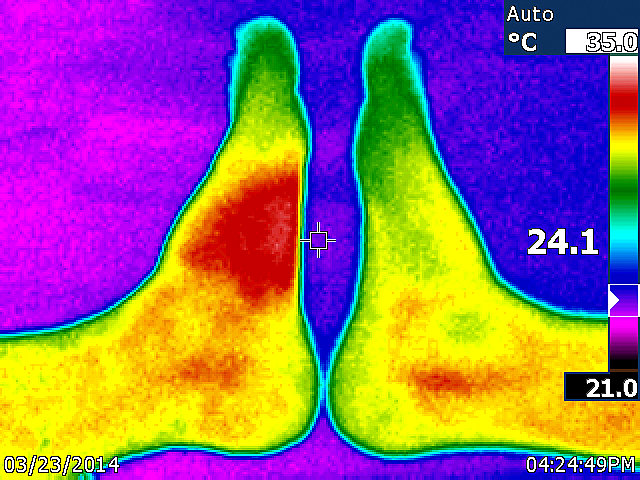
The left side of the image is showing the temperature increase caused by an insect bite after about 28 hours.

Most arthropod bites and stings cause self-limited redness, itchiness and/or pain around the site. Less commonly (around 10% of Hymenoptera sting reactions), a large local reaction occurs when the area of swelling is greater than 10 centimetres (4 in). Rarely (1-3% of Hymenoptera sting reactions), systemic reactions can affect multiple organs and pose a medical emergency, as in the case of anaphylactic shock.

=== Defensive and predatory bites and stings ===
Many arthropods bite or sting in order to immobilize their prey or deter potential predators as a defense mechanism. Stings containing venom are more likely to be painful. Less frequently, venomous spider bites are also associated with morbidity and mortality in humans.

Most arthropod stings involve Hymenoptera (ants, wasps, and bees). While the majority of Hymenoptera stings are locally painful, their associated venom rarely cause toxic reactions unless victims receive many stings at once. The low mortality (around 60 deaths per year in the US out of unreported millions of stings nationwide) associated with Hymenoptera is mostly due to anaphylaxis from venom hypersensitivity.

Most scorpion stings also cause self-limited pain or paresthesias. Only certain species (from family Buthidae) inject neurotoxic venom, responsible for most morbidity and mortality. Severe toxic reactions can occur resulting in progressive hemodynamic instability, neuromuscular dysfunction, cardiogenic shock, pulmonary edema, multi-organ failure, and death. Although robust epidemiological data is unavailable, global estimates of scorpion stings exceed 1.2 million resulting in more than 3000 deaths annually.

Spider bites most often cause minor symptoms and resolve without intervention. Medically significant spider bites involve substantial envenomation from only certain species such as widow spiders and recluse spiders. Symptoms of latrodectism (from widow spiders) may include pain at the bite or involve the chest and abdomen, sweating, muscle cramps and vomiting among others. By comparison, loxoscelism (from recluse spiders) can present with local necrosis of the surrounding skin and widespread breakdown of red blood cells. Headaches, vomiting and a mild fever may also occur.

=== Feeding bites ===
Feeding bites have characteristic patterns and symptoms that reflect feeding habits of the offending pest and the chemistry of its saliva. Feeding bites are less likely to be felt at the time of the bite, although there are some exceptions. Since feeding requires longer attachment to prey than envenomation, feeding bites are more often associated with vector transmission of disease.

Pest	Preferred body part	Felt at time of bite	Reaction
Mosquitoes	exposed appendages	usually not	Low raised welt, itches for several hours.
Midges and no-see-ums	exposed appendages	usually	Itches for several hours.
Fleas	prefer ankles and bare feet	usually	May make red itchy welt; several days. Later bites are less severe.
Biting flies	any exposed skin	painful and immediate	Painful welt, several hours.
Bed bugs	appendages, neck, exposed skin	usually not	Low red itchy welts, usually several together resembling rash, slow to develop and can last weeks.
Hair Lice	pubic area or scalp	usually not	Infested area intensely itchy, with red welts at bite sites. See pediculosis.
Larval ticks	Anywhere on body, but prefer covered skin, crevices.	Usually not; may be scratched off before they are seen.	Intensely itchy red welts lasting over a week.
Adult ticks	covered skin, crevices, entire body	usually not	Itchy welt, several days.
Mites	mainly on the trunk and extremities	usually not	Intensely itchy welts and papules that may last for days. See acariasis.

== As vectors of disease ==
In addition to stings and bites causing discomfort in of themselves, bites can also spread secondary infections if the arthropod is carrying a virus, bacteria, or parasite. The World Health Organization (WHO) estimates that 17% of all infectious diseases worldwide were transmitted by arthropod vectors, resulting in over 700,000 deaths annually. The table below lists common arthropod vectors and their associated diseases. The figure below represents endemic areas of common vector-borne diseases.

Vector	Pathogen class	Disease	Annual disease burden*
Mosquitoes (Culicidae)	Arboviruses (Togavirus, Flavivirus, Bunyavirus) Protozoa (Plasmodia) Nematode (Wuchereria bancrofti)	Chikugunya, Zika, Yellow fever, Dengue, West Nile, California encephalitis, Japanese encephalitis, Equine encephalitis, Rift Valley fever Malaria Lymphatic filariasis	>300 million
Black flies (Simuliidae)	Nematode (Onchocerca volvulus)	River blindness	>10 million
Assassin bug (Reduviidae)	Protozoa (Trypanosoma cruzi)	Chagas disease	>6 million
Sand fly (Phlebotominae)	Protozoa (Leishmania)	Cutaneous and visceral leishmaniasis	>3 million
Ticks (Ixodidae)	Arboviruses (Bunyavirus, Flavirus) Bacteria (Rickettsia, Anaplasma, Ehrlichia, Borrelia burgdorferi, Coxiella burnetti) Protozoa (Babesia)	Heartland virus, Tick-borne encephalitis, Crimean–Congo hemorrhagic fever Rocky Mountain spotted fever, anaplasmosis, ehrlichiosis, Lyme disease, Q fever Babesiosis	>500,000
Tsetse flies (Glossinidae)	Protozoa (Trypanosoma gambiense, T. rhodesesiense)	African sleeping sickness	>10,000
Biting flies (Tabanidae)	Nematode (Loa Loa)	African eyeworm	NA
Fleas (Siphonaptera, Pulicidae)	Bacteria (Yersinia pestis, Bartonella henselae)	Plague, Cat scratch fever	NA
Lice (Phthiraptera, Pediculidae)	Bacteria (Borrelia recurrentis, Rickettsia prowazekii, Bartonella quintana)	Lice-borne relapsing fever, endemic typhus, Trench fever	NA

*Estimated global number of cases annually according to WHO in 2017. If a vector transmits multiple diseases, aggregate case numbers are listed. Rough estimates are only meant to provide a sense of scale. Unknown disease burden is listed as NA for not available.

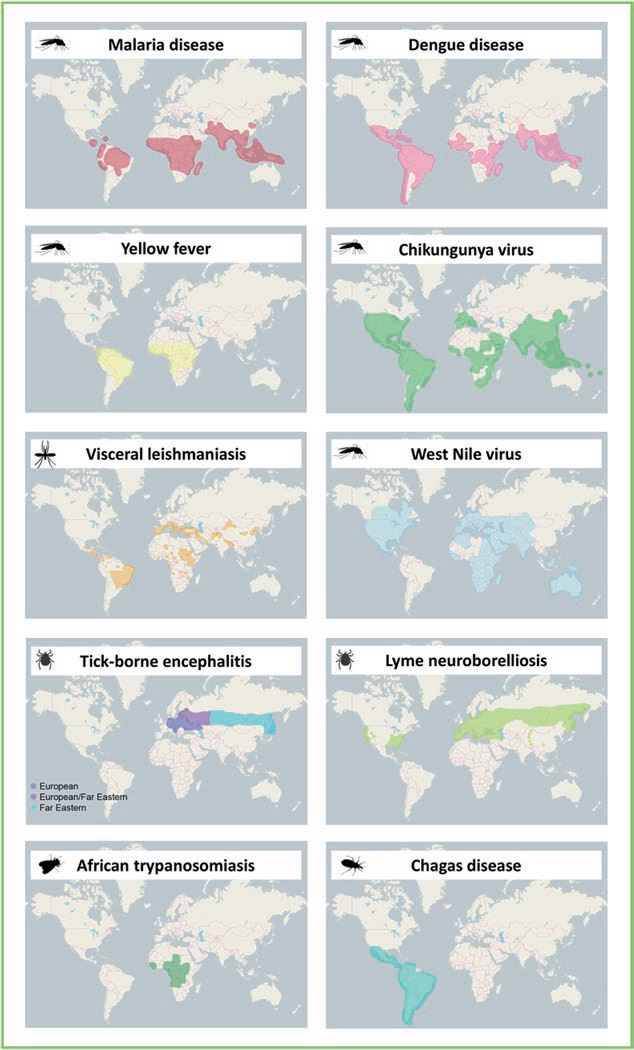
Geographic distribution of major vector-borne diseases

== Diagnosis ==
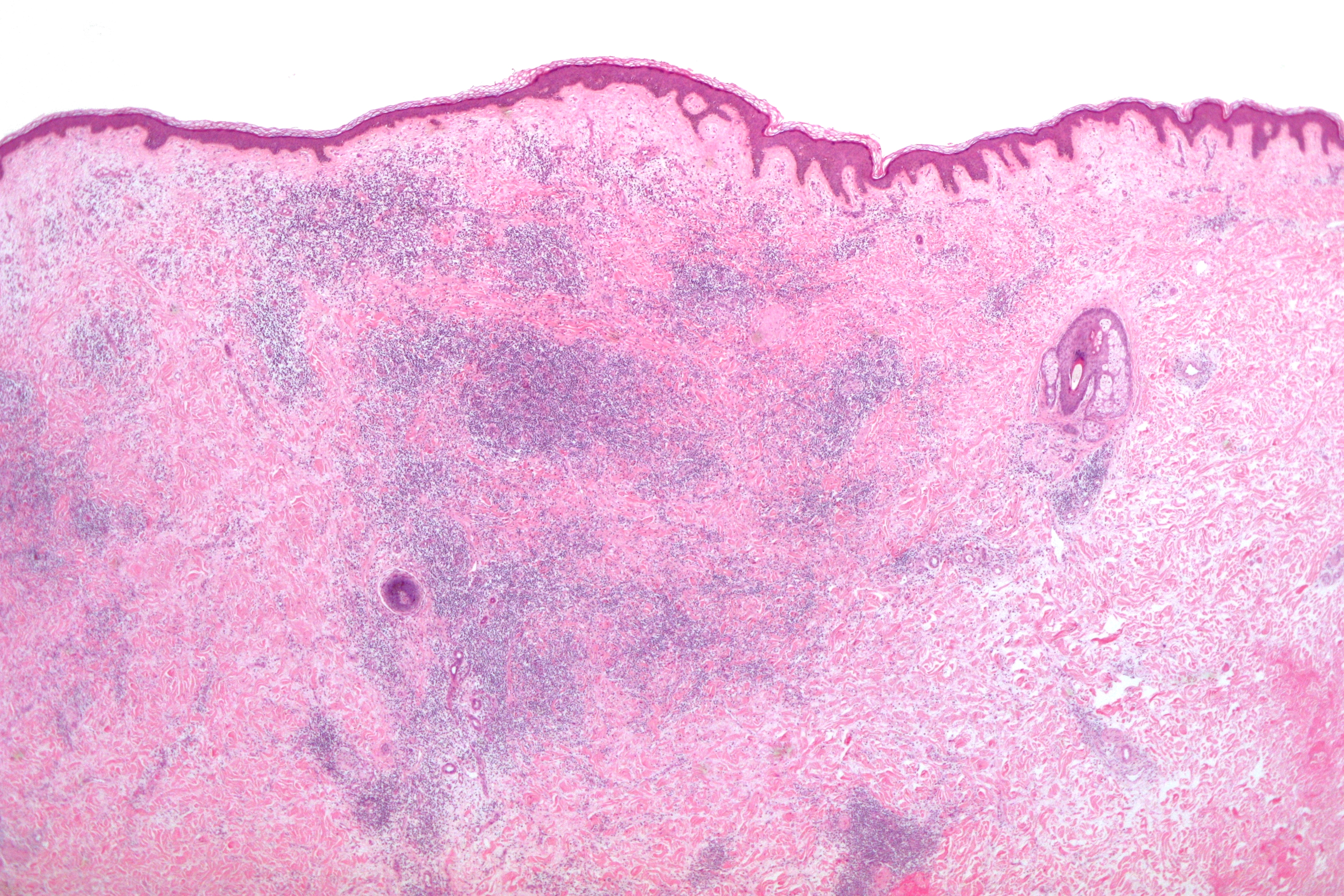
Low-magnification micrograph showing wedge-shaped perivascular inflammation (superficial dermal perivascular lymphoeosinophilic infiltrate), the histomorphologic appearance of an insect bite (H&E stain).

Most arthropod bites and stings do not require a specific diagnosis since they typically improve with supportive management alone. Certain bites and stings present with characteristic appearances and distributions. In general, however, dermoscopic findings of bitten or stung skin rarely aid in diagnosis. Rather, patient history (recent travel to endemic areas, outdoor activities, and other risk factors) primarily guides the diagnostic approach, which can raise clinical suspicion for more serious complications like vector-borne diseases.

=== Microscopic appearance ===
Skin biopsies are not indicated for bites or stings, since the histomorphologic appearance is non-specific. Bites and stings as well as other conditions (e.g. drug reactions, urticarial reactions, and early bullous pemphigoid) can cause microscopic changes such as a wedge-shaped superficial dermal perivascular infiltrate consisting of abundant lymphocytes and scattered eosinophils, as shown in the adjacent figure:

== Prevention ==
Prevention strategies against arthropod bites and stings comprise measures for personal protection, travel advisories, public health and environmental concerns.

=== Personal protection ===
Travelers should seek to minimize outdoor activity during peak activity times and avoid high risk areas such as regions with known outbreaks or epidemics. Standing water and dense vegetation also commonly attract arthropods. Clothes covering most exposed skin can also provide a measure of physical protection, which may be augmented when the fabric is treated with pesticides such as Permethrin. Topical repellants such as N,N-diethyl-m-toluamide (DEET) is supported by a large body of evidence.

Vaccines may also help prevent vector-borne diseases for eligible patients. For example, Japanese encephalitis, Yellow fever, and Dengue fever have FDA-approved vaccines available. Since they are relatively new vaccines, however, they are not standard of care as of 2023. Additionally, patients traveling to Malaria endemic regions are routinely prescribed Malaria chemoprophylaxis.

Patients with a history of venom hypersensitivity may benefit from venom immunotherapy (VIT). Patients eligible for VIT include those with a prior anaphylactic reaction to a venomous sting and who have IgE to venom allergens. VIT can help prevent future severe systemic reactions in select patients.

=== Global health ===
International organizations such as WHO aim to reduce disease burdens of neglected tropical diseases, many of which are vector borne. Such campaigns must incorporate multipronged approaches to consider global inequality, access to resources, and climate change.

== Management ==
Most arthropod bites and stings require only supportive care. However, complications such as envenomation and severe allergic reactions can present as medical emergencies.

=== Supportive care ===
Local reactions to bites and stings are treated symptomatically. If a stinger is still embedded, manual removal can reduce further irritation. Washing the affected area with soap and water can help reduce risk of contamination. Oral antihistamines, calamine lotion, topical corticosteroids and cold compresses are common over the counter remedies to reduce itchiness and local inflammation. In more severe cases, such as large local reactions, systemic glucocorticoids are sometimes prescribed, although limited evidence supports their effectiveness. There are limited data to support one treatment over another.

=== Medical emergencies ===
Systemic reactions from venom hypersensitivity can rapidly progress to a medical emergency. The mainstay of anaphylactic shock management is intramuscularly injected epinephrine. The patient should be stabilized and transferred to an intensive care unit.

Toxic reactions to envenomation are similarly managed with medical stabilization and symptomatic treatment. Tetanus prophylaxis should be up to date but antibiotics are typically unnecessary unless a bacterial superinfection is suspected. Antivenom drugs have been created for certain species such as Centruroides scorpion stings, but these drugs are not yet widely available and so typically reserved for severe systemic toxicity.

Several vector-borne diseases can present emergently.

=== Treatment of vector-borne diseases ===
After confirmation of diagnosis, antimicrobials are prescribed according to standard of care.

== Biting and stinging arthropods ==
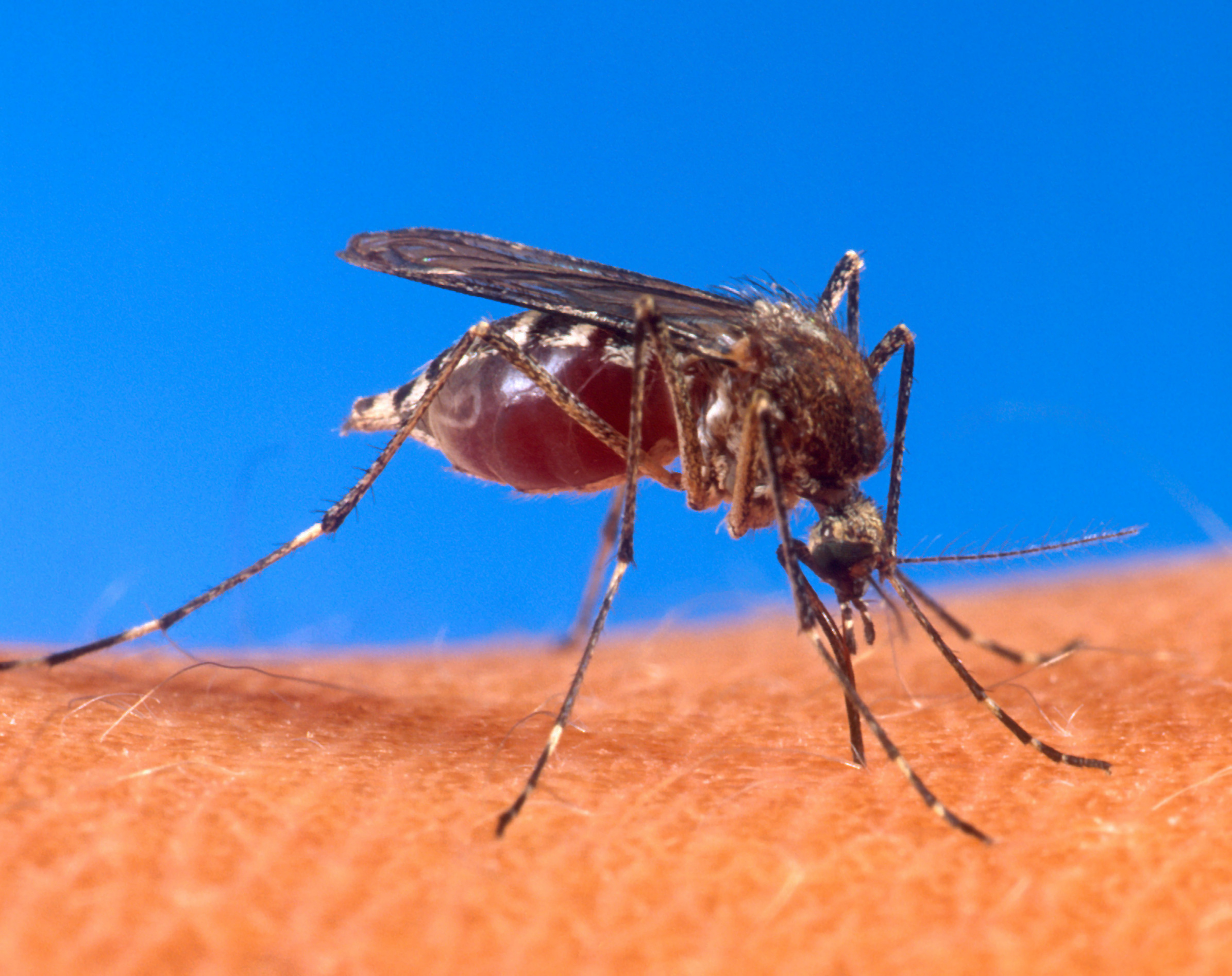
Aedes aegypti, the yellow fever mosquito, biting. Female mosquitoes feed on blood. This species is known for also transmitting yellow fever.

A bite is defined as coming from the mouthparts of the arthropod. The bite consists of both the bite wound and the saliva. The saliva of the arthropod may contain anticoagulants, as in insects and arachnids which feed from blood. Feeding bites may also contain anaesthetic, to prevent the bite from being felt. Feeding bites may also contain digestive enzymes, as in spiders; spider bites have primarily evolved to paralyse and then digest prey. A sting comes from the abdomen; in most insects (which are all largely hymenopterans), the stinger is a modified ovipositor, which protrudes from the abdomen.

The sting consists of an insertion wound, and venom. The venom is evolved to cause pain to a predator, paralyse a prey item, or both. Because insect stingers evolved from ovipositors, in most hymenopterans only the female can sting. However, there are a few orders of wasp where the male has evolved a "pseudo sting" - the male genitalia has evolved two sharp protrusions which can deliver an insertion wound. However, they do not contain venom, so they are not considered a true sting. In ants that bite instead of sting, such as the Formicinae, the bite causes the wound, but during the bite the abdomen bends forward to spray formic acid into the wound, causing additional pain. In arachnids that sting (all largely scorpions), the stinger is not a modified ovipositor, but instead a metasoma that bears a telson. (Scorpions lack an ovipositor entirely and give birth to live young.)

=== Insects ===
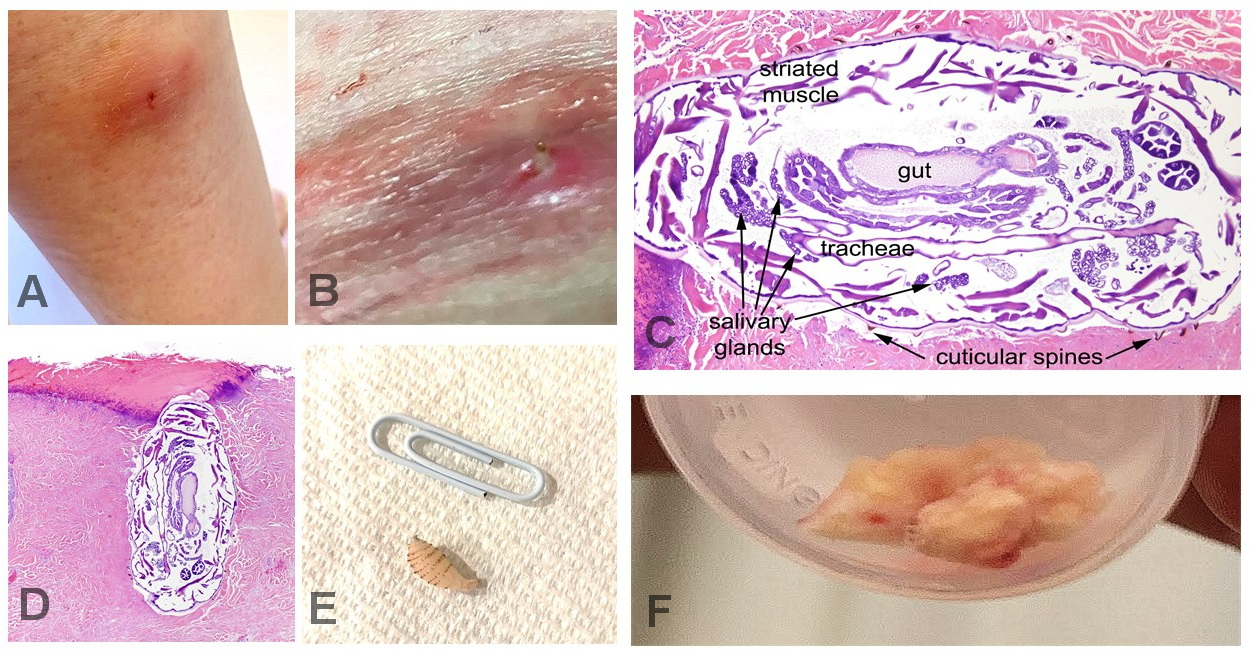
The botfly lays its eggs in the wound after biting, causing an infection of parasitic maggots called Myiasis.

==== Diptera (True flies) ====
- Black flies (Simuliidae)
- Horse-flies (Tabanidae)
  - Deer flies/Yellow flies (Chrysops)
- Tsetse flies (Glossinidae)
- Stable flies (Muscidae)
- Biting midges or No see-ums (Ceratopogonidae)
  - Highland midge
- Mosquitos (Culicidae)
- Botflies (as larvae, Oestridae)
- Sandflies (Phlebotomidae)
  - Lutzomyia
  - Phlebotomus
- Blow-flies (as larvae, Calliphoridae)
- Screw-worm flies (as larvae, Calliphoridae)
- Hippoboscidae (Keds)

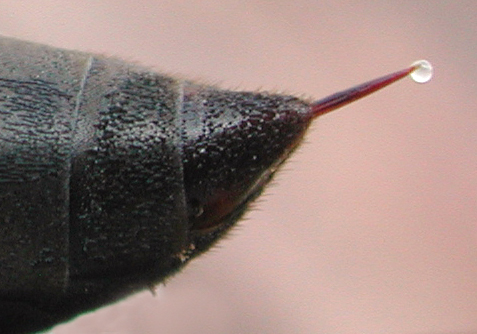
Venom droplet from a wasp stinger. Wasp stings in humans can provoke a strong localised reaction, and rarely, anaphylaxis in those with a wasp sting allergy.

==== Hymenoptera (ants, bees and wasps) ====
- Ants
  - Bull ants (sting)
  - Fire ants (both bite and sting)
  - Bullet ants (sting)
- Bees
  - Honeybees (sting)
  - Stingless bees (bite)
  - Bumblebees (sting)
- Wasps (sting)
  - Hornets (sting)
  - Yellow Jackets (sting)
  - Paper wasps (sting)

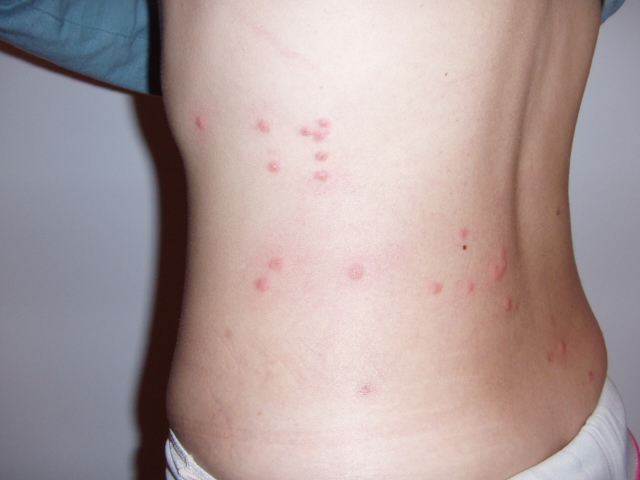
Flea bites. Rarely, some species of fleas can also transmit secondary infections, such as flea-borne (murine) typhus.

==== Siphonaptera (Fleas) ====
- Fleas (bite)
  - Human flea Pulex irritans
  - Chigoe flea Tunga penetrans

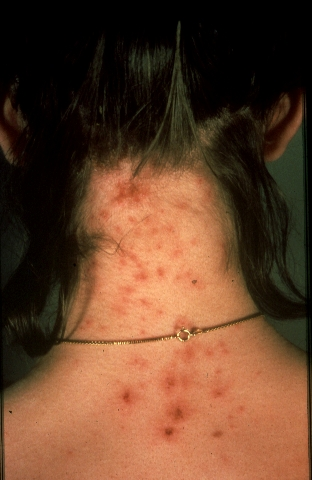
Louse bites. Lice do not carry disease.

==== Phthiraptera (Lice) ====
- Lice (bite)
  - Head lice
  - Body lice
  - Crab lice

==== Other insects ====
- Assassin bug/Kissing bug
- Bedbugs
- Conenose bug

=== Arachnids ===
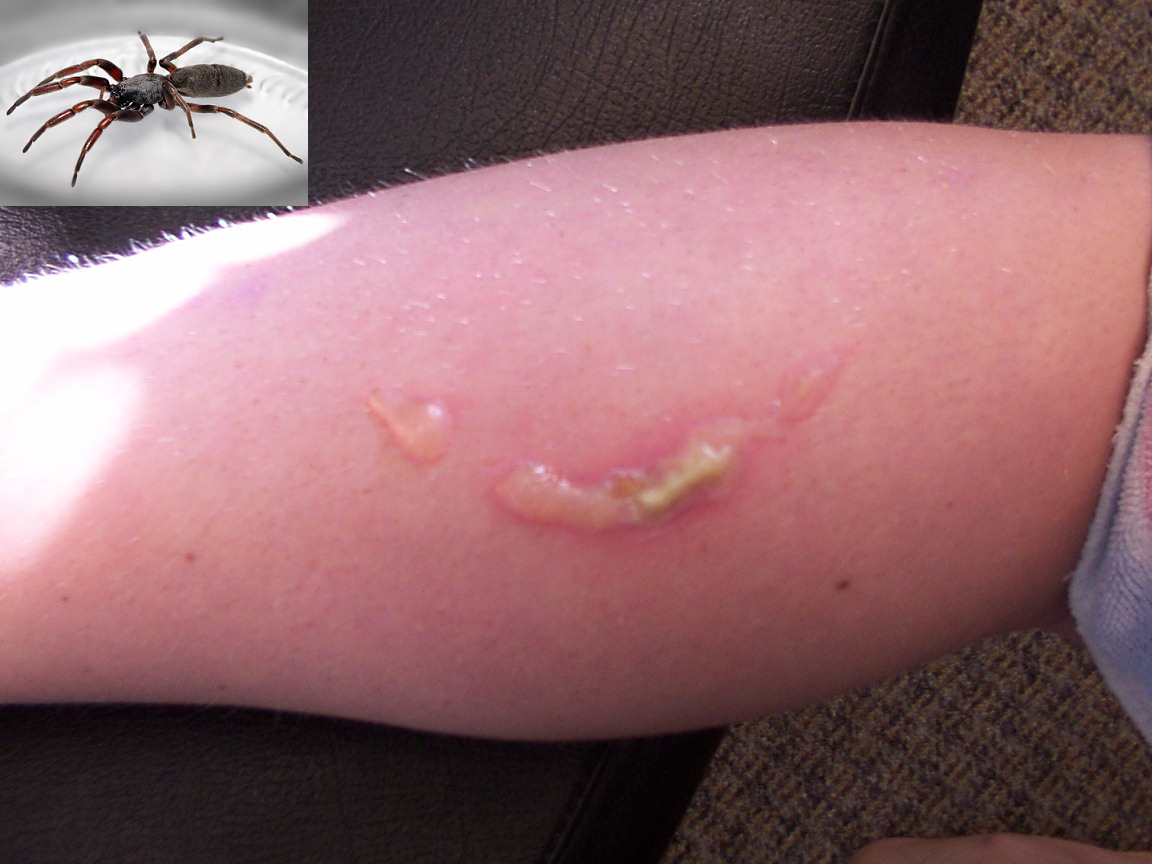
White-tailed Spider bite

==== Mites ====
- Chiggers
- Red Poultry Mite
- Spiny rat mite
- House mouse mite
- Northern fowl mite
- Tropical fowl mite
- Mange mite
- Scabies
- Ticks

==== Scorpions ====
- All species sting

=== Myriapoda ===
- Centipedes
