= Acariasis =

Parasitic ectoparasitic infectious disease caused by mites

- Specialty: Infectious disease

Acariasis is a medical condition characterized by infestation of human or animal tissues by mites, a diverse group of microscopic arthropods belonging to the order Acari. This condition can manifest in multiple ways, ranging from skin-related disorders to potentially invasive infections affecting various bodily systems. Unlike many parasitic infestations, acariasis is not limited to cutaneous manifestations and can impact internal organs, including the gastrointestinal and respiratory tracts.

== Terminology ==
There are several complications with the terminology:

Acariasis is a term for a rash, caused by mites, sometimes with a papillae (pruritic dermatitis) or papule (papular urticaria), and usually accompanied by a hive (urticaria) and severe itching sensations. An example of such an infection is scabies or gamasoidosis.

The closely related term, mange, is commonly used with domestic animals and also livestock and wild mammals, whenever hair-loss is involved. Sarcoptes and Demodex species are involved in mange, but both of these genera are also involved in human skin diseases (by convention only, not called mange). Sarcoptes in humans is especially severe symptomatically, and causes the condition scabies noted above.

Another genus of mite which causing itching but rarely causes hair loss because it burrows only at the keratin level, is Cheyletiella. Various species of this genus of mite also affect a wide variety of mammals, including humans.

Mite infestation sometimes implies an ectoparasitic, cutaneous condition such as dermatitis. However, it is possible for mites to invade the gastrointestinal and urinary tracts.

MeSH uses the term "Mite Infestations" as pertaining to Acariformes. However, mites not in this grouping can be associated with human disease. (See "Classification", below.)

The term Acari refers to ticks and mites together, which can cause ambiguity. (Mites are a paraphyletic grouping).

Mites can be associated with disease in at least three different ways: (1) cutaneous dermatitis, (2) production of allergin, and (3) as a vector for parasitic diseases. The language used to describe mite infestation often does not distinguish among these.

== Classification ==
Most of the mites which cause this condition to humans are from the order Acari, hence the name Acariasis. The entire taxonomic classification to order would be:

- Kingdom: Animalia
- Phylum: Arthropoda
- Subphylum: Chelicerata
- Class: Arachnida
- Order: Acari (At the order level, there is still substantial argument among researchers as to how to categorize Acari. Some call it a subclass, others a superorder, "Acarina".)

Specific species involved include:

- Acariformes
  - Trombidiformes
    - Trombicula species (Trombiculosis or chiggers)
    - Demodex species (Demodicosis)
    - Pyemotes tritici
    - Cheyletiella
  - Sarcoptiformes
    - Sarcoptes scabiei (Scabies)
- Parasitiformes
  - Dermanyssus gallinae, Ornithonyssus bursa, Ornithonyssus sylviarum (Gamasoidosis)
  - Liponyssoides sanguineus, Laelaps echidnina, Ornithonyssus bacoti (Rodent mite dermatitis)
  - Another candidate is Androlaelaps casalis. However, based on this mite's life style as a predator on other mite species (such as the previously mentioned Dermanyssus gallinae), it is highly unlikely to be a cause of acariasis.

Some of these reflect reports existing of human infestation by mites previously believed not to prey on humans.

== Diagnosis ==
Medical doctors and dermatologists can still misdiagnose this rash as many are unfamiliar with parasitism, not trained in it, or if they do consider it, cannot see the mites.

Different methods for detection are recognized for different acariasis infections. Human acariasis with mites can occur in the gastrointestinal tract, lungs, urinary tracts and other organs which have not been well-studied. For intestinal acariasis, symptoms such as abdominal pain, diarrhea, and hematochezia have been reported. Diagnosis of intestinal acariasis is confirmed by the detection of mites in stools, which must be microscopically examined to confirm the specific species of mite causing the infestation. For pulmonary acariasis, the presence of mites in sputum is determined by identifying the presence and number of mites in the sputum of patients with respiratory symptoms. Both physical and chemical methods for liquefaction of sputum have been developed.
