= Gamasoidosis =

Dermatitis caused by avian mites

- Other names: Acariasis, avian mite dermatitis, bird mite dermatitis, fowl mite dermatitis, dermanyssosis
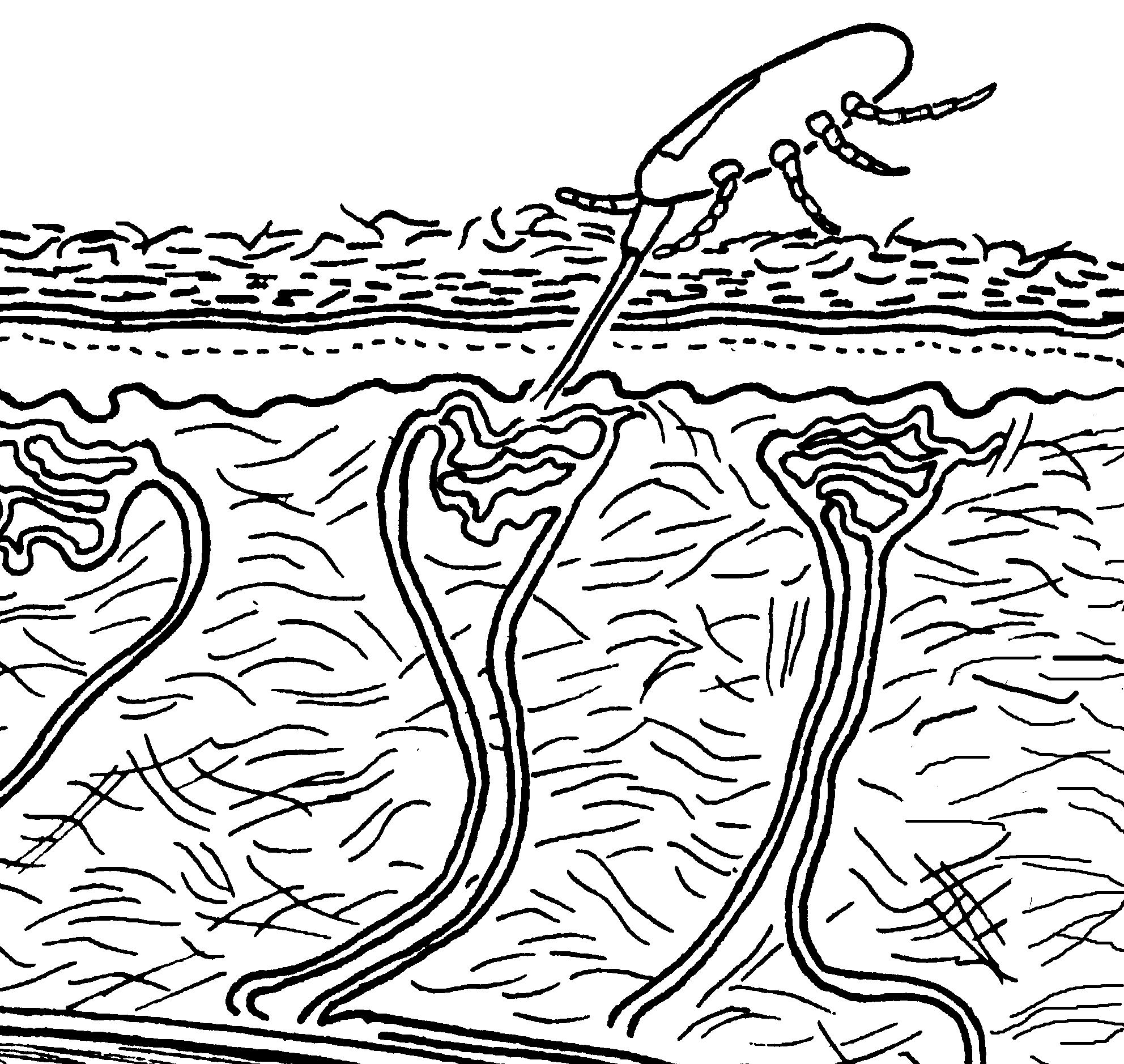
- Dermanyssus gallinae piercing skin with its long chelicerae to reach dermal capillaries (not to scale).
- Specialty: Dermatology, medical parasitology
- Symptoms: Pruritic erythematous papules, macules, urticaria, itching, skin irritation
- Causes: Infestation with avian mites (Dermanyssus and Ornithonyssus species)
- Risk factors: Close proximity to birds or infested environments, urban nesting birds, poultry farming
- Diagnostic method: Clinical signs, microscopic identification of mites, dermatoscopy
- Differential diagnosis: Scabies, cheyletiellosis, trombiculosis, bedbug infestations, urticarial dermatitis, delusional parasitosis
- Frequency: Increasing in urban and occupational settings

Gamasoidosis, also known as dermanyssosis, is a frequently unrecognized form of zoonotic dermatitis, following human infestation with avian mites of the genera Dermanyssus or Ornithonyssus. It is characterized by pruritic erythematous papules, macules and urticaria, with itching and irritation resulting from the saliva the mites secrete while feeding. These bites are observed all over the body. The avian mite Dermanyssus gallinae can also infest various parts of the body, including the ear canal and scalp.

Diagnosis is challenging due to the mites' size, requiring microscopic identification by a medical entomologist, and the clinical symptoms often mimic other conditions, such as scabies or allergic reactions. The atypical or delayed responses to mite bites, coupled with widespread ignorance and misinformation among healthcare providers, scientists, and pest control professionals, contribute to frequent underdiagnosis and misdiagnosis, hindering effective management and treatment.

Gamasoidosis is linked to avian mites infesting residential, public and agricultural spaces, with a potential health threat due to the transmission of zoonotic pathogens by D. gallinae. Treatment involves eliminating mites from the environment—a process complicated by their resilience and rapid reproduction—and managing patient symptoms, which are typically self-limiting but may require supportive care.

The condition poses a growing public health concern, linked to urbanization, occupational risks, and zoonotic pathogens. Limited awareness and misdiagnosis have been identified as challenges; a One Health approach coordinating expertise across sectors has been proposed to address diagnosis, prevention, and treatment in both human and animal health.

== Signs and symptoms ==
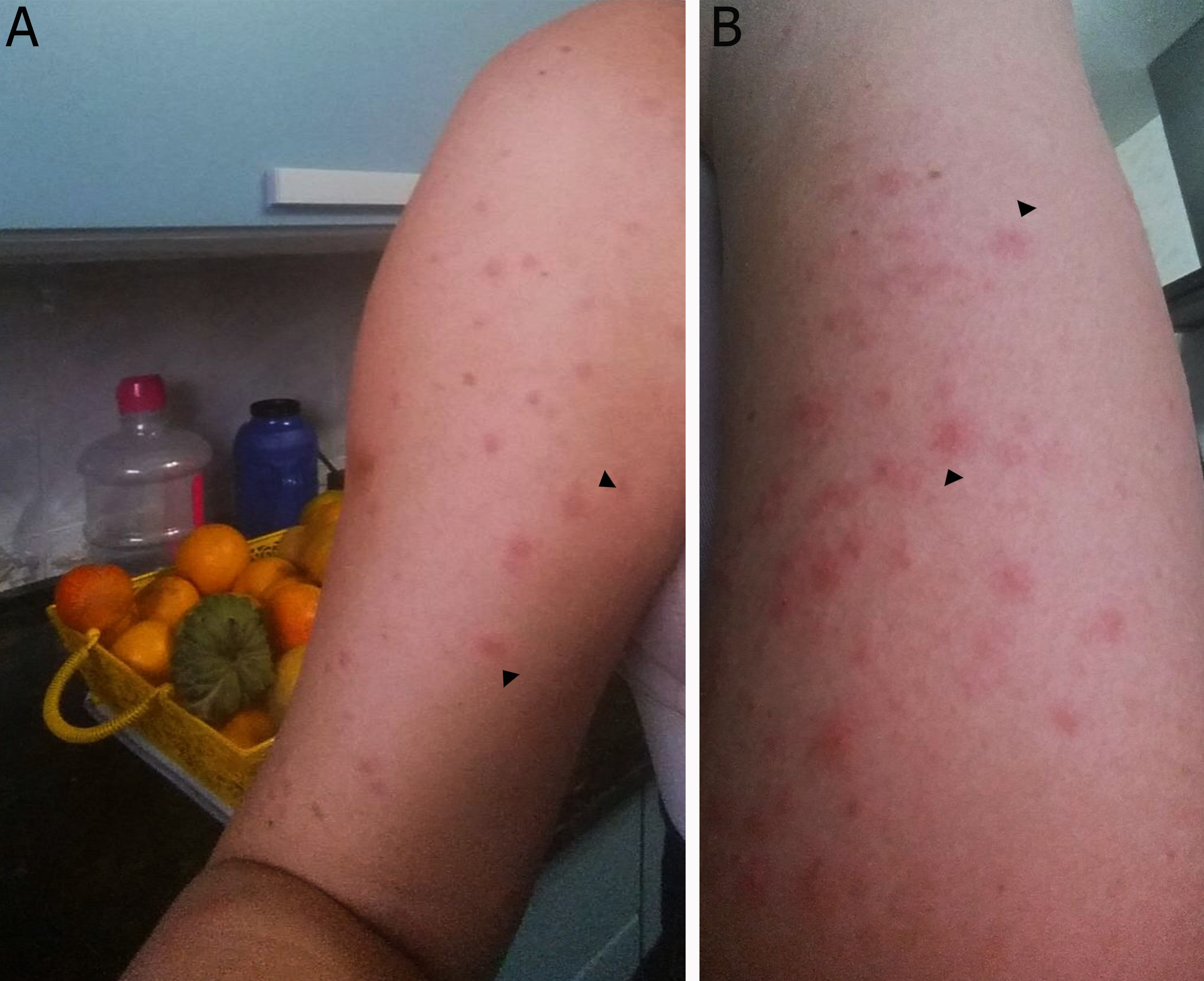
A. Patient's arm displaying bites from Ornithonyssus bursa. B. Close-up of dermatitis on the arm. The black arrows indicate the affected areas.

=== Bites ===
Avian mite bites induce a non-specific dermatitis. Common symptoms include pruritic erythematous papules, with a size of 1–3 mm, and a central punctum, as well as macules and urticaria. Individuals frequently describe repeated or long-term episodes of papular outbreaks, often appearing in clusters and accompanied by severe itching sensations. Itching and skin irritation result from the saliva secreted by the mites during feeding.

Bites can be found anywhere on the body. Described areas affected include the waist, trunk, upper extremities, abdomen, legs, finger webs, axillae, groin, buttocks, and face. Bites are frequently reported to be grouped and more pronounced in areas where clothing applies pressure, such as along a belt line or beneath the breasts. When feeding happens during sleep, bedding may show red stains from crushed mites or their droppings.

Additional symptoms include pinpricks, secondary infections, scarring and hyperpigmentation.

=== Infestations of body parts ===
Dermanyssus gallinae can infest the ear canal, causing symptoms such as itching, inflammation, and discharge. It can also affect the scalp, with severe nighttime itching as a characteristic symptom, and has been reported to infest the nares, orbits, eyelids, and genitourinary and rectal areas.

=== Allergic reactions ===
Instances of systemic allergies, such as asthma and allergic rhinitis, linked to Ornithonyssus sylviarum have been documented. However, Kavallari et al. note that there are no reported cases of systemic allergies caused by Dermanyssus mites to date.

== Causes ==
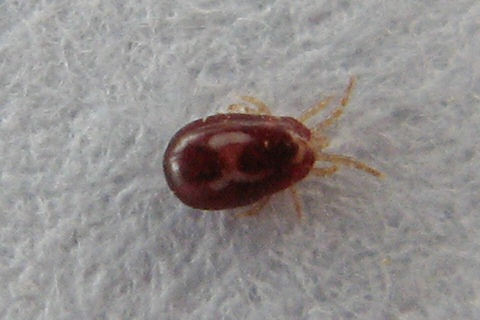
Dermanyssus gallinae on a sheet of paper; a species commonly implicated in causing gamasoidosis

=== Overview ===
Gamasoidosis occurs after human contact with blood-feeding gamasid avian mites of the genera of Ornithonyssus (Mesostigmata: Macronyssidae) and Dermanyssus (Mesostigmata: Dermanyssidae). Species implicated include the red mite (Dermanyssus gallinae), tropical fowl mite (Ornithonyssus bursa) and northern fowl mite (Ornithonyssus sylviarum). These mites typically infest birds such as canaries, sparrows, starlings, pigeons, and poultry.

=== Host expansion and feeding behavior ===
When avian hosts are unavailable, these free-living mites may opportunistically feed on other animals, including humans. It has been hypothesized that D. gallinae is capable of learning "to associate non-host skin with a blood-meal if the host selection process permitted feeding." This, combined with their generalist strategy for host-seeking and the ability to digest non-avian blood, could explain their observed expansion to include mammals and humans as hosts.

=== Urban and occupational associations ===
The rise in urbanization, particularly in warmer regions where avian mites flourish, has led to a greater incidence of gamasoidosis. Urban gamasoidosis is associated with window-sills, ventilation and air-conditioning intakes, roofs and eaves, which serve as shelters for nesting birds.

Gamasoidosis in farm workers is associated with poultry farms, with a "19% incidence of contact dermatitis reported in a two-year survey of workers on 58 European poultry farms". D. gallinae exposure is so common that it is considered an occupational hazard for these workers.

=== Pet infestations ===
Pets such as canaries, cats, dogs, hamsters, and gerbils are also susceptible to infestation by avian mites. Non-avian infestations may be underdiagnosed or underestimated, suggesting a need for increased awareness among veterinarians to improve diagnosis and treatment in such cases.

For pets, there are currently no registered products for treating gamasoidosis in mammals. The scientific literature documents medications which have been used off-label to treat the condition, including sarolaner in dogs, selamectin in cats and permethrin in horses.

=== Rodent mite dermatitis ===
Dermatitis is also associated with rodents infested with the tropical rat mite (Ornithonyssus bacoti), spiny rat mite (Laelaps echidnina) and house-mouse mite (Liponyssoides sanguineus), where the condition is known as rodent mite dermatitis.

== Diagnosis ==
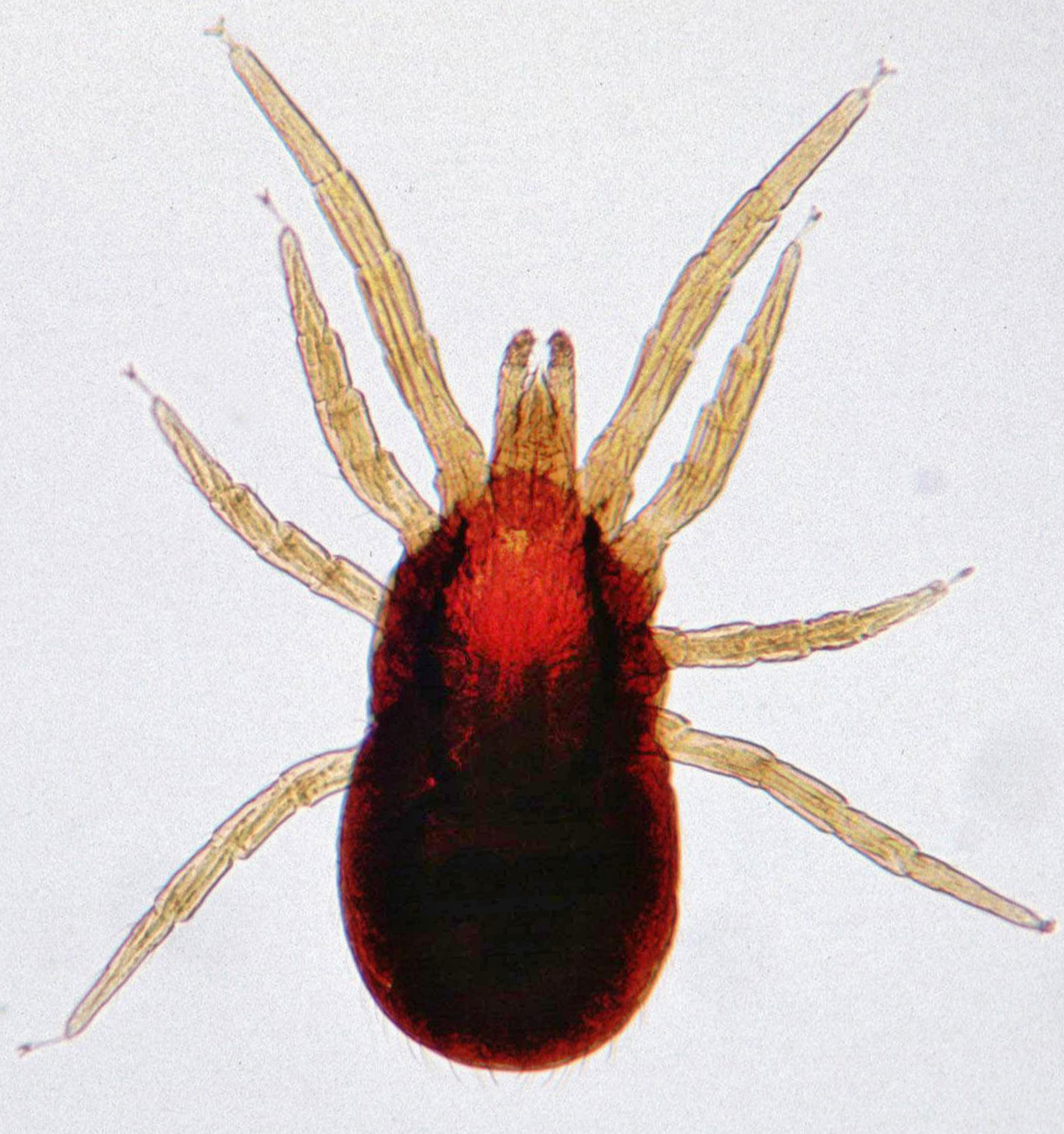
Dermanyssus gallinae under a microscope

=== History ===
Diagnoses of gamasoidosis have a long history, with "cases [...] reported since the 17th century, documented in the leading medical literature since at least the 1920s." The first case of human infestation was suspected by Willan in 1809. Later, in 1828, Saint-Vincent became the first to identify the parasite on the skin of an affected person. Kavallari et al. note that since 1936, 105 cases of D. gallinae infestations in humans have been documented in the literature. D. gallinae's digestion of human blood was first documented in 1958.

Avian and rodent mites have been documented as infesting residential buildings, work spaces, schools and hospitals. Despite this, widespread ignorance and misinformation about human infestation with D. gallinae exists across the healthcare, scientific, and pest control sectors, which in turn has led to increasing numbers of infestations and a dangerous propagation of the disease.

=== Challenges ===
Diagnosing avian mites can be difficult because their tiny size renders them almost invisible without magnification. They are between 0.3 and 1 mm in length and have oval-shaped bodies, featuring four pairs of legs. Their coloration is translucent brown prior to feeding, transitioning to a reddish hue once they have consumed a meal. Understanding the specific bite reactions of avian mites can aid clinicians in identifying and addressing this perplexing dermatologic condition.

Because gamasoidosis is a rare diagnosis and its skin reactions are often atypical, most physicians are unfamiliar with the condition. As a result, gamasoidosis is frequently overlooked or misdiagnosed. One misdiagnosis is scabies; however, unlike scabies mites, avian mites can be seen with the naked eye and do not burrow. Bites can also be mistaken for those caused by other conditions such as cheyletiellosis (Cheyletiella), trombiculosis (Trombicula), bedbug infestations (Cimex lectularius), or urticarial dermatitis. Additionally, these lesions are sometimes misattributed to allergic reactions or misinterpreted as symptoms of delusional parasitosis. Dermatoscopy can help differentiate mite infestations from delusional parasitosis, aiding in accurate diagnosis.

Allergists and dermatologists should prioritize inspecting potential sources to locate, collect, and accurately identify mites, a task best handled by skilled parasitologists. Identification of the species is best carried out by a medical entomologist using a microscope. Distinguishing Ornithonyssus from Dermanyssus and identifying cryptic species within D. gallinae is difficult due to overlapping traits and reproductive isolation. D. gallinae mainly infests poultry globally, while special lineage L1 targets pigeons, posing zoonotic risks in urban areas. DNA analysis, including mitochondrial markers, is required for precise identification. Accurate species identification informs the choice of treatment.

Gamasoidosis usually affects only one person in a household, as the condition requires both mite exposure and an allergic sensitivity. However, there have been reported cases where all members of a nuclear family experience symptoms in response to avian mite bites.

Many cases of gamasoidosis go unreported, suggesting that the actual incidence is higher than generally believed. As a result, in cases of unexplained bites in residential areas, the involvement of D. gallinae should always be considered, especially during late spring and early summer when wild birds make their nests. Diagnosing the responsible agent in symptomatic workers can be challenging. Over time, workers may develop a tolerance to mite bites, decreasing the likelihood of reporting such incidents. Nonetheless, outbreaks can occur after periods of reduced exposure or when new employees are introduced to the workplace.

=== Life cycle ===
The life cycle of the mite is an important method of diagnosis. Avian mites, like D. gallinae, are temporary parasites that hide in dark spaces during the day. Their life cycle, from egg to adult, can be completed in seven days in warm conditions. When avian mites lose access to blood meals from nesting birds, they embark on a nocturnal search for alternative hosts.

Blood-feeding starts at the protonymph stage, with adults feeding briefly at night every two to three days. Engorged females turn red and lay eggs soon after feeding. They may also feed during the day if the room is sufficiently dark. Attacks in public and office buildings tend to occur during the daytime. O. bursa is an exception as it generally remains on its hosts and will feed during the day.

In urban homes D. gallinae may be commonly found in the bedroom or where the patient sleeps, as they prefer to stay close to their host for optimal feeding. Typically, it visits its host for 1–2 hours, departing after completing its blood meal. They are highly mobile and can locate potential hosts through temperature changes, vibrations, chemical signals, and carbon dioxide emissions. Avian mites can travel through various pathways such as floors, walls, ceilings, and most commonly via ventilation or air conditioning systems.

=== Associated risk factors ===
There is documented "co-occurrence of gamasoidosis and various immunosuppressive disorders" and physicians should bear in mind that immunocompromised patients, patients that take corticosteroids, and patients with dementia may have a more severe infestation than healthy patients. Despite this, while immunosuppression can "increase susceptibility, it is not necessarily a pre-requisite for infestation".

== Prevention ==
=== Urban areas ===
Preventing gamasoidosis in urban areas is achieved by avoiding the proliferation of avian mites, by refraining from feeding birds and utilizing nets on building terraces to deter nesting in close proximity to human homes. It is essential to remove and clean nests during the nesting season before birds can establish them and lay eggs.

=== Workplaces ===
Maintaining cleanliness in workplaces and homes, such as frequent vacuuming and monitoring for feral birds, can help prevent future occurrences. Employees working with animals or animal products should undergo proper health and safety training to understand workplace risks, adopt safe practices, and utilize appropriate PPE when necessary. In some occupational environments, medical surveillance for high-risk workers might be advisable to detect and address infestations early.

== Treatment ==
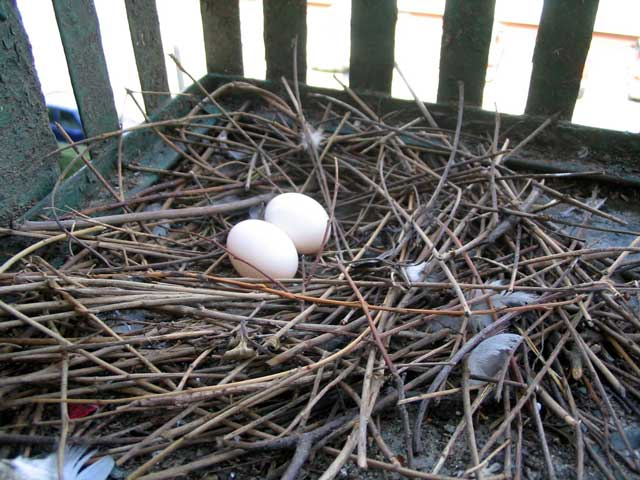
Feral pigeon nests are common sources of avian mites and should be removed as part of the treatment process.

=== Eradication from environment ===
To achieve full recovery, it is essential to eradicate the mites from the patient's environment. This process involves identifying and removing sources of infestation, such as bird nests, and disinfecting affected areas with the help of pest control professionals. However, complete eradication can be challenging due to several factors, including the resilience and behavior of avian mites.

Avian mite species, such as Dermanyssus gallinae, can survive for over nine months without a blood meal. Their nocturnal behavior and tendency to leave the host after brief feeding sessions to hide in cracks and crevices further complicate eradication efforts. Eggs and larvae are often located away from birds or humans, typically hidden in hard-to-reach crevices that may be distant from treated areas.

Under favorable conditions, avian mite populations can expand rapidly. For instance, a single female mite can lay up to 30 eggs in her lifetime and prolonged darkness can significantly accelerate their growth. D. gallinae thrives at temperatures of 20–25°C and a relative humidity of 70–90%, while low humidity and extreme temperatures (below 5°C or above 45°C) hinder their development and survival.

Avian mites are also capable of digesting human blood and it is widely believed that they cannot reproduce without avian blood. However, some studies, such as those by George et al., suggest that avian mites may develop and sustain prolonged infestations on human blood, challenging this assumption.

The treatment of gamasoidosis is further complicated by pesticide resistance among avian mites and their diverse ecological behaviors, which require tailored treatment strategies. Employing a variety of techniques, following a Integrated Pest Management approach, can reduce the likelihood of major re-infestations and limit the development of resistance to specific insecticides.

Attempts to eradicate infestations are often prolonged and ineffective, leading to significant financial burdens and psychological issues such as depression, particularly when patients are forced to relocate or invest heavily in pest control measures.

==== Recommendations for patients ====
Patients are advised to:

- Wash clothes at 60 °C.
- Remove the source of the mites, such as bird nests.
- Perform regular intensive vacuum cleaning and steam cleaning — the vacuum bag should be placed in a sealed bag and thrown away outside in a contained bin.
- Disinfect infested areas with pyrethroids.
- Wash of textiles or steam cleaning (cushions, carpets, curtains) at 60 °C, and drying them using an automated laundry drier.

=== Eradication from body ===
Avian mites are typically not found on human skin, as they tend to leave their host after feeding and are capable of moving with remarkable speed. However, patients are recommended to shower frequently. In the case of scalp infestation, treatments with 1% permethrin shampoo can be used to remove the mites. For ear canal infestation, aural toilet is recommended with a course of 1% permethrin to be used as ear drops and for infected wax to be removed by a professional.

=== Management of symptoms ===
Oral antihistamines and topical corticosteroids can be used to alleviate discomfort. However, as the rash is self-limiting, no targeted therapy is generally necessary. While topical antihistamines may offer temporary relief, their use is generally discouraged due to the potential risk of adverse skin reactions, such as allergic contact dermatitis. Patients can be comforted knowing that the lesions typically resolve on their own over time. Although subsequent exposure to biting arthropods might trigger occasional flare-ups, most people gradually build a tolerance.

== Epidemiology ==
Gamasoidosis, particularly caused by D. gallinae, is source of growing concern in human medicine, due to factors such as limited awareness among medical specialists, lack of interdisciplinary collaboration, misdiagnoses, and an absence of diagnostic tools. Occurrences of gamasoidosis have become more frequent in recent years, especially in residential environments, often linked to synanthropic birds. The condition has been described as a worldwide infestation, with cases being identified in countries including Denmark, Egypt, France, Iran, Japan, Montenegro, Morocco, the Netherlands, Norway, Serbia, Turkey, and the United Kingdom. A "One Health" approach has been recommended to remedy this, with microbiologists, veterinarians, parasitologists, epidemiologists, environmental scientists, and clinicians working together to treat the disease.

D. gallinae may pose a threat to public health as the mite may be a vector or reservoir of several zoonotic pathogens, such as Chlamydia psittaci, Erysipelothrix rhusiopathiae, Salmonella spp., Mycobacterium spp., Coxiella burnetii, Bartonella spp., Borrelia afzelii, Venezuelan equine encephalitis virus, Eastern equine encephalitis virus, and Fowlpox virus. An association has not been found with gamasoidosis and alpha-gal allergy.

== See also ==
- Acariasis
- Chigger bite
- Rodent mite dermatitis
- Skin lesion
