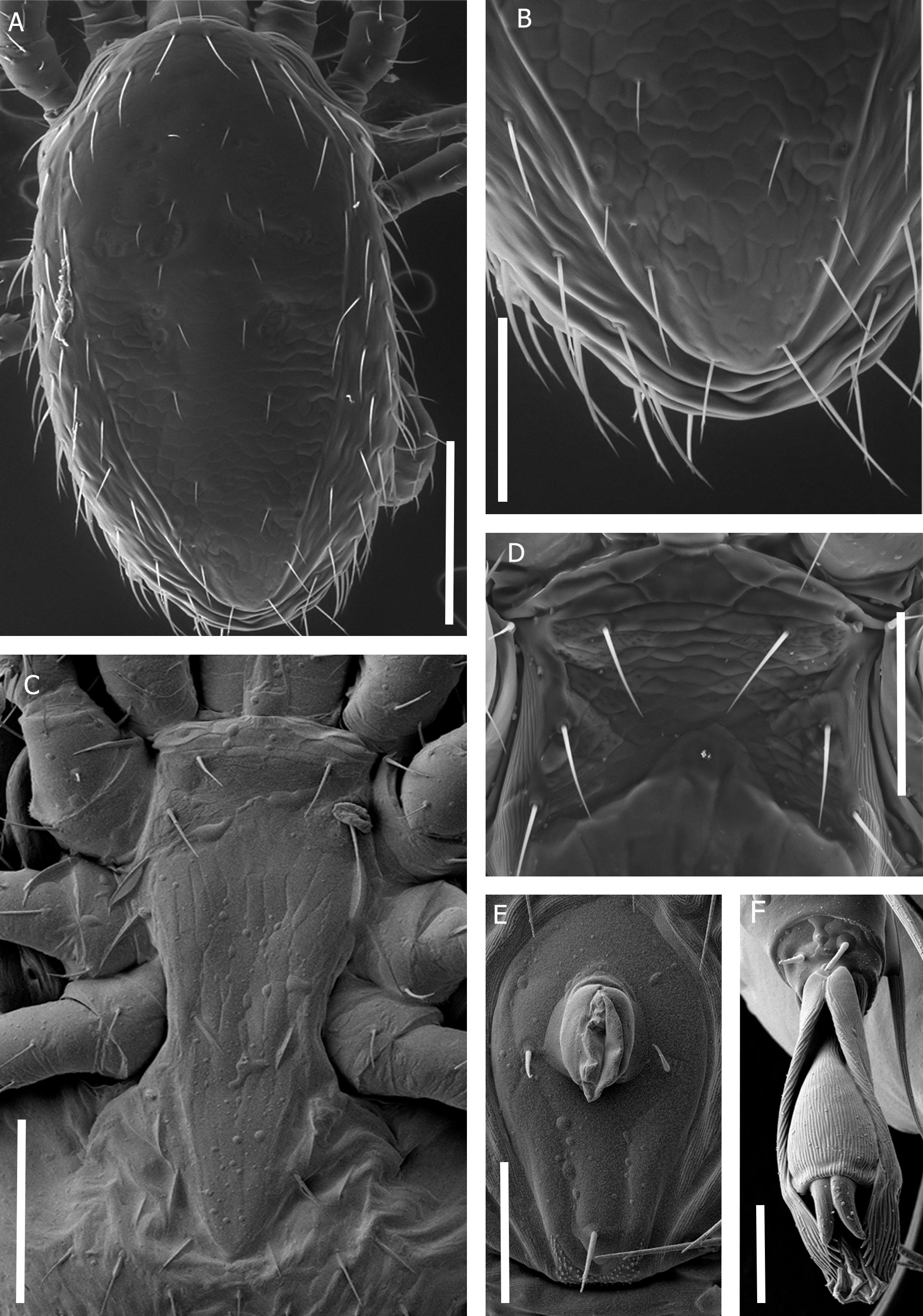
- Ornithonyssus bursa under electron scanning microscope

Scientific classification
- Kingdom: Animalia
- Phylum: Arthropoda
- Subphylum: Chelicerata
- Class: Arachnida
- Order: Mesostigmata
- Family: Macronyssidae
- Genus: Ornithonyssus
- Species: O. bursa

Binomial name
- Ornithonyssus bursa (Berlese, 1888)

= Ornithonyssus bursa =

Species of mite

Ornithonyssus bursa (also known as the tropical fowl mite) is a species of mite. It is most often a parasite of birds, but also has been found to bite humans and two species of mammals. It usually lives in birds' feathers, but for laying its eggs, it more often uses their nests rather than their feathers. Tropical fowl mites undergo five stages during their development: egg, larva, protonymph, deutonymph, and adult. During the last two stages, they suck blood from their host for food. They are often diurnal, whereas northern fowl mites are nocturnal in nature.

== Synonyms ==
Ornithonyssus bursa has been described under the following synonyms, which are no longer used:

- Leiognathus bursa Berlese (1888)
- Liponyssus bursa Hirst (1916)
- Ornithonyssus bursa Sambon (1928)

== Description ==
Ornithonyssus bursa has four pairs of legs, three of which are located on the sternal plate. Towards its posterior end, its body narrows slightly. These two features distinguish it from another member of the genus, Ornithonyssus sylviarum, whose posterior end narrows considerably and which possesses only two pairs of legs on its sternal plate.

== Effects on humans ==
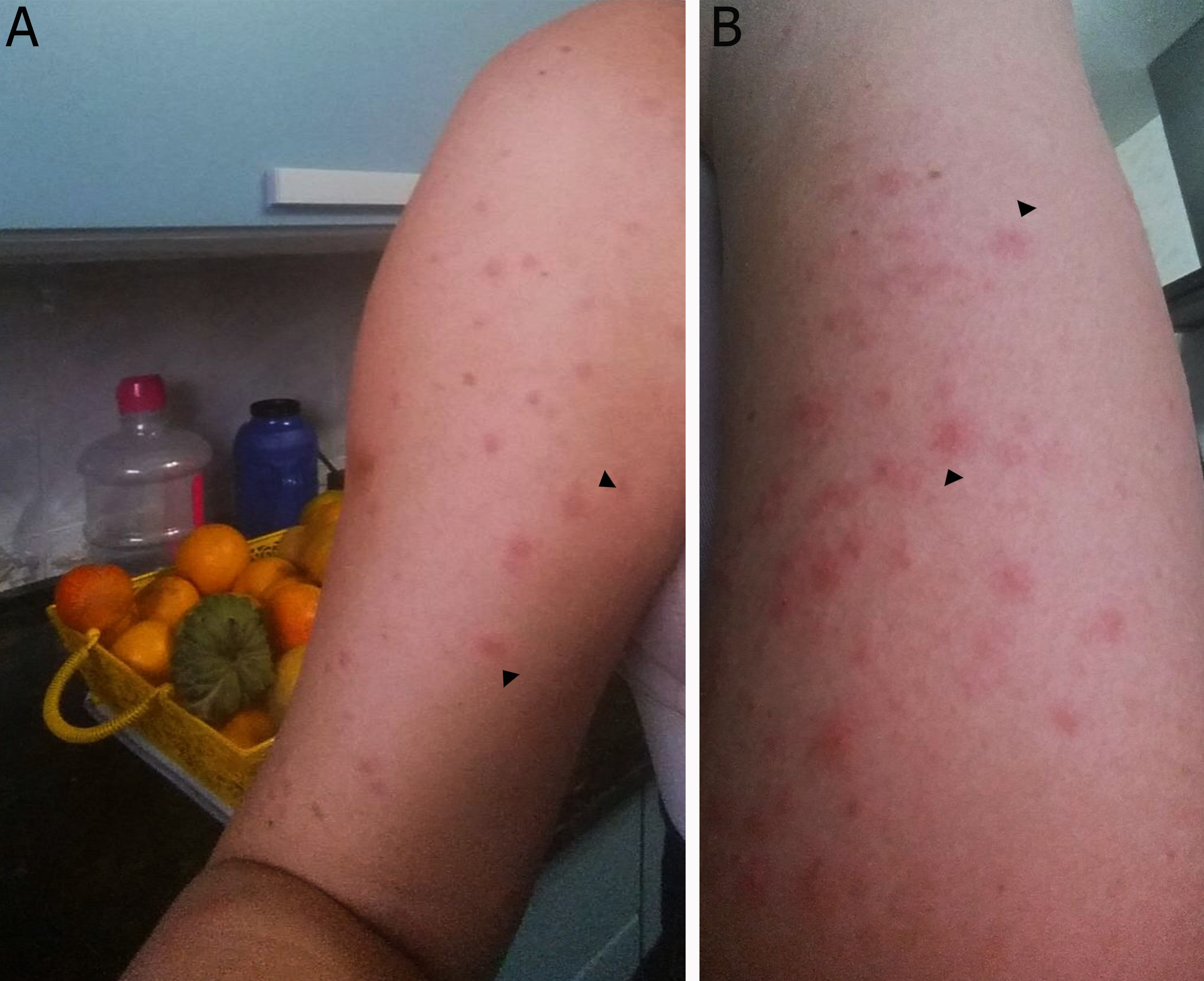
Bites on human arm from O. bursa

Ornithonyssus bursa can move from birds' nests into human homes. It also infests domestic fowl and can spread to humans handling fowl. Its bites cause small, irritating skin lesions and in some people, intense skin inflammation.

== See also ==
- Acariasis
- Gamasoidosis
- List of mites associated with cutaneous reactions
