= Rodent mite dermatitis =

Disease of humans caused by mites

- Other names: Rat mite dermatitis
- Specialty: Dermatology

Rodent mite dermatitis (also known as rat mite dermatitis) is an often unrecognized ectoparasitosis occurring after human contact with haematophagous mesostigmatid mites that infest rodents, such as house mice, rats and hamsters. The condition is associated with the tropical rat mite (Ornithonyssus bacoti), spiny rat mite (Laelaps echidnina) and house mouse mite (Liponyssoides sanguineus) which opportunistically feed on humans. Rodent mites are capable of surviving for long periods without feeding and travelling long distances when seeking hosts. Cases have been reported in homes, libraries, hospitals and care homes. A similar condition, known as gamasoidosis, is caused by avian mites.

== Symptoms and signs ==
Rodent mite bites leave multiple groups or individual small itchy papules (around 1–2 mm in diameter) on the skin (papular urticaria). These are found mostly "on the upper extremities, neck, upper trunk and face".

== Diagnosis ==
Diagnosis requires species identification of the parasite, which will be likely to be found in the environment of its host rather than on the host's skin. Rodent mites are very small, for O. bacoti "female mites reach a size between 0.75 and 1.40 mm, males are a little smaller".

== Treatment ==
The original rodent host of the mites must be located and eradicated, and their nests removed. Steps should also be taken to prevent future infestations, such as by blocking the rodents means of entry into the building. The patient's environment should then be treated, using both non-residual and residual insecticides, mites crawling in the open can be removed by vacuuming or with a cloth moistened with alcohol.

Bites can be treated with antihistamines and corticosteroids, to relieve the associated itching and allergic reactions.

== Epidemiology ==
L. sanguineus has been implicated in the spread of Rickettsialpox.

== See also ==
- Acariasis
- Gamasoidosis
