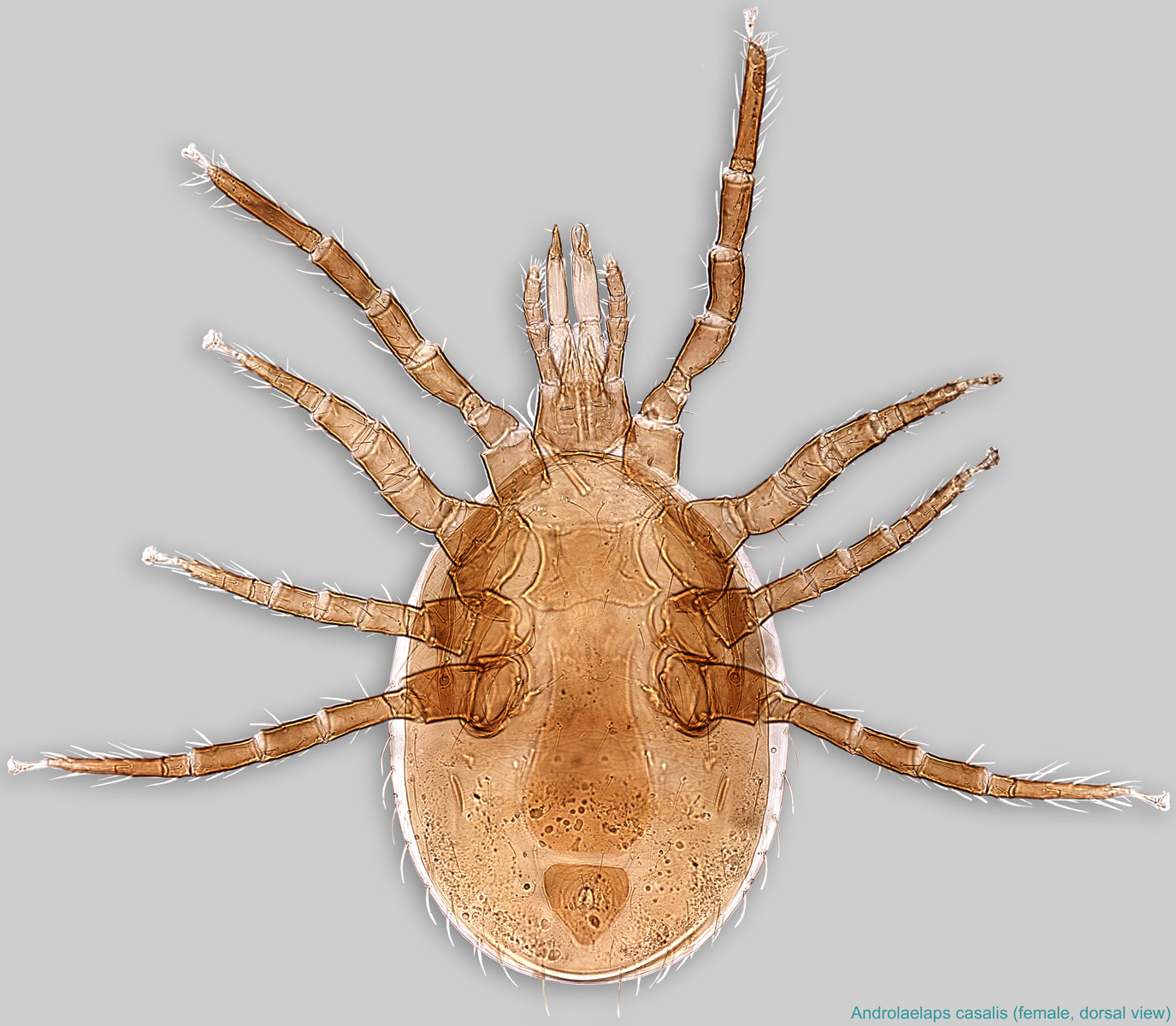
- Androlaelaps casalis female magnified 40x

Scientific classification
- Domain: Eukaryota
- Kingdom: Animalia
- Phylum: Arthropoda
- Subphylum: Chelicerata
- Class: Arachnida
- Order: Mesostigmata
- Family: Laelapidae
- Genus: Androlaelaps
- Species: A. casalis

Binomial name
- Androlaelaps casalis (Berlese, 1887)

Synonyms
- Iphis casalis Berlese, 1887

= Androlaelaps casalis =

Species of mite

Androlaelaps casalis, formerly known as Haemolaelaps casalis, is a species of predatory mite that feeds on other mites and small invertebrates. It cannot bite or sting birds and humans because its mandibles are not designed for sucking but for predation on other mites. Because Androlaelaps casalis mites feed off parasitic mites like Dermanyssus gallinae, individuals with red colored abdomens can be found. This is not due to any blood-sucking by A. casalis but is because it has ingested blood-engorged parasitic mites. There is some evidence that it may be associated with dermatitis in humans.
