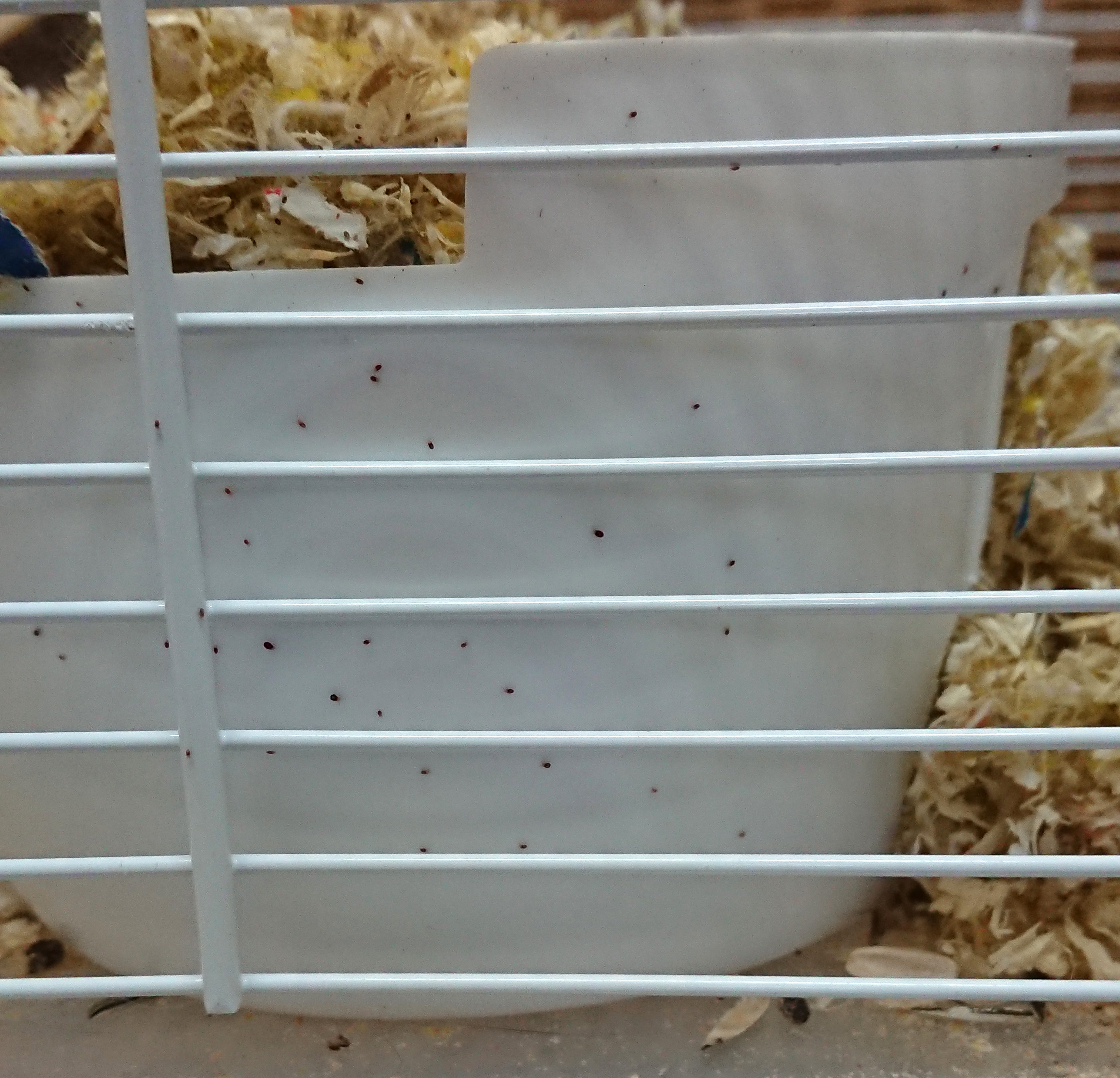

Scientific classification
- Kingdom: Animalia
- Phylum: Arthropoda
- Subphylum: Chelicerata
- Class: Arachnida
- Order: Mesostigmata
- Family: Macronyssidae
- Genus: Ornithonyssus
- Species: O. bacoti

Binomial name
- Ornithonyssus bacoti (Hirst, 1913)

= Ornithonyssus bacoti =

Species of mite

Ornithonyssus bacoti (also known as the tropical rat mite and formerly called Liponyssus bacoti) is a hematophagous parasite. It feeds on blood and serum from many hosts. O. bacoti can be found and cause disease on rats and wild rodents most commonly, but also small mammals and humans when other hosts are scarce. Outbreaks tend to occur in older, less maintained buildings. The mite, however, can travel several hundred feet on its own if necessary to find a host and can survive for extended periods of time without a host. This, along with the nonspecific dermatitis it causes, can prevent accurate and fast diagnosis of rat mite dermatitis. The scarcity of reports, due in part to misdiagnosis and also the mildness of its symptoms, makes the disease seem less common than it is. The tropical rat mite can be found in both temperate and tropical regions or rather all continents except the Arctic and Antarctic.

== History ==
The tropical rat mite was first reported in Australia in 1913 in a human case report. In 1923, the United States identified it as a cause of dermatitis in humans. In 1931, it was discovered in Hamburg, Germany, in a seaport.

== Anatomy ==
The tropical rat mite is between 0.75 and 1.44 mm in length and is unsegmented with chelicerae or mandibles which are suited to piercing. They have a sharp caudal apex of the scutum, an oval genital shield, and a cranially positioned anus. These mites are capable of parthenogenic reproduction. After taking a blood meal, they are static and yellow or dark red in color. However, before a blood meal, they are more active and grey in color.

== Life cycle ==
Ornithonyssus bacoti has five lifestages: egg, larva, protonymph, deutonymph, and adult. The only two stages that feed are the protonymph and the adult. Once they have fed, they either drop off the host to molt or lay up to 100 eggs. An egg takes one and a half days to hatch into a larva, which then attaches to a host and takes one to two days to molt into a protonymph. A protonymph then molts into an adult. The whole lifeycle takes 7 to 16 days to complete. A minimum of 13 days is needed to go from egg to egg. The larva is the only stage that has three pairs of legs, as opposed to four pairs.

== Disease ==
When the tropical rat mite bites its host, it causes an inflammatory reaction to its saliva and then pruritic nonspecific dermatitis, known as rat mite dermatitis. Welts may persist for weeks in some individuals. In children especially, vesicular or eczematous reactions sometimes occur. Secondary excoriations due to scratching are common. Papular urticaria has been suggested as developing in some people.

No human disease has been definitively found to be naturally vectored by this mite. Lab demonstrations have proved that the mite is at least capable of vectoring murine typhus, rickettsialpox, tularemia, plague, coxsackievirus, and Q fever, although it has not been known to do so outside the lab. The mite was reported as capable of vectoring human typhus, but these reports are not generally accepted.

=== Diagnosis ===
The bites tend to be grouped together due to the piecemeal feeding behavior of these mites. They can occur anywhere on the body though commonly on the neck, head, extremities, abdomen and chest. The papules are generally 1 to 4 mm in diameter and sometimes vesicles appear. The symptoms of this disease are common or at least mistakable for many things that should be checked for as well in differential diagnosis such as prurigo simplex, allergies, mosquito or other insect bites, bacterial folliculitis, dermatitis herpetiformis, scabies, and pediculosis. Identification of the mite itself is required for definitive diagnosis. This can be collected by laying cellophane tape or "sticky cards" (cardboard cards with a glue surface) in the area believed to be infested with the mite.

A biopsy of the lesions only shows superficial and mid-dermal perivascular infiltrates and occasionally eosinophils. This method is so nonspecific as to be inconclusive in diagnosis.

=== Treatment ===
Treatment of rat mite dermatitis is on a symptomatic basis. Generally, an oral antihistamine, a topical corticosteroid, gamma benzene hexachloride, benzyl benzoate, or crotamiton is used to provide relief. Some patients however require no treatment. Bug sprays containing DEET can help prevent bites during an active infestation. To effectively rid the patient of dermatitis thorough eradication of the mite from pets and their environment is crucial. Acaricides for the environment might be hydrocyanic acid, chlorophenothane (DDT), chlordane, permethrin, pyriproxyfen, or lindane. Pet rats are a natural host for mites, but other small mammals kept as pets (mice, hamsters, rabbits, guinea pigs, etc.) may also suffer infestation. To rid pets of the mite, selamectin is generally used in the form of Revolution, Stronghold or Pfizer. Extermination of rats and other wild rodents which are common hosts is also key. Several weeks are needed to be sure that a proper eradication of these mites is complete because the mites are not only found mostly in the environment of the host instead of on the host itself, but also have been found to survive up to 63 days without a blood meal.

== See also ==
- Acariasis
- Gamasoidosis
- Rodent mite dermatitis
- List of mites associated with cutaneous reactions
