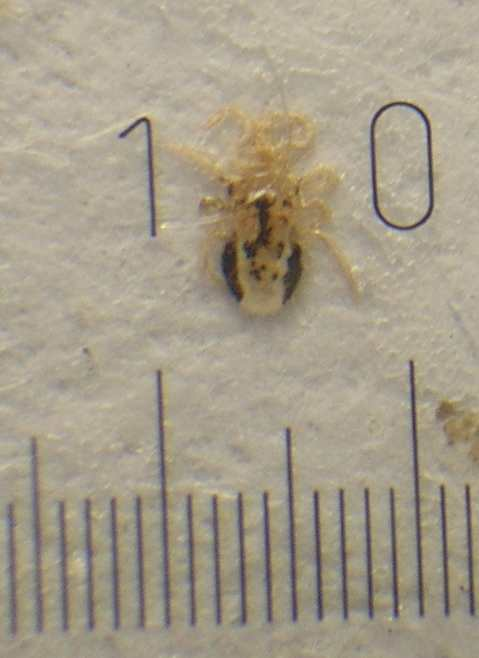
- Ornithonyssus sylviarum

Scientific classification
- Kingdom: Animalia
- Phylum: Arthropoda
- Subphylum: Chelicerata
- Class: Arachnida
- Order: Mesostigmata
- Family: Macronyssidae
- Genus: Ornithonyssus; Sambon, 1928

Species
- See text

Synonyms
- Leiognathus Canestrini, 1884 (preocc.); Fonsecanyssus Radford, 1950; Cryptonyssus Radovsky, 1966; Bdellonyssus Fonseca, 1941; Neoichoronyssus Fonseca, 1941; Lepronyssoides Fonseca, 1941; Macronyssoides Radovsky, 1966; Megistonyssus Radovsky, 1966; Parasteatonyssus Radovsky, 1966

= Ornithonyssus =

Genus of mite

Ornithonyssus is a mite genus of the family Macronyssidae.

== Species ==
- Ornithonyssus acrobates Micherdzinski & Domrow, 1985
- Ornithonyssus africanus (Zumpt & Till, 1958)
- Ornithonyssus bacoti (Hirst, 1913) commonly known as the tropical rat mite. A frequently occurring rat mite that has a painful bite.
- Ornithonyssus benoiti Till, 1982
- Ornithonyssus bursa (Berlese, 1888) commonly known as the tropical fowl mite.
- Ornithonyssus campester Micherdzinski & Domrow, 1985
- Ornithonyssus capensis Shepherd & Narro, 1983
- Ornithonyssus conciliatus (Radovsky, 1967)
- Ornithonyssus costai Micherdzinski, 1980
- Ornithonyssus dasyuri Domrow, 1983
- Ornithonyssus desultorius (Radovsky, 1966)
- Ornithonyssus flexus (Radovsky, 1967)
- Ornithonyssus garridoi de-la-Cruz, 1981
- Ornithonyssus hypertrichus Radovsky, 2007
- Ornithonyssus jayanti (Advani & Vazirani, 1981)
- Ornithonyssus kochi (Fonseca, 1948)
- Ornithonyssus latro Domrow, 1963
- Ornithonyssus longisetosus Micherdzinski, 1980
- Ornithonyssus lukoschusi Micherdzinski, 1980
- Ornithonyssus matogrosso (Fonseca, 1954)
- Ornithonyssus noeli de-la-Cruz, 1983
- Ornithonyssus nyctinomi (Zumpt & Patterson, 1951)
- Ornithonyssus petauri Micherdzinski, 1980
- Ornithonyssus pereirai (Fonseca, 1935)
- Ornithonyssus pipistrelli (Oudemans, 1904)
- Ornithonyssus praedo Domrow, 1971
- Ornithonyssus roseinnesi (Zumpt & Till, 1953)
- Ornithonyssus simulatus Micherdzinski, 1980
- Ornithonyssus spinosa Manson, 1972
- Ornithonyssus stigmaticus Micherdzinski & Domrow, 1985
- Ornithonyssus sylviarum (G.Canestrini & Fanzago, 1877) commonly known as the northern fowl mite.
- Ornithonyssus taphozous Micherdzinski & Domrow, 1985
