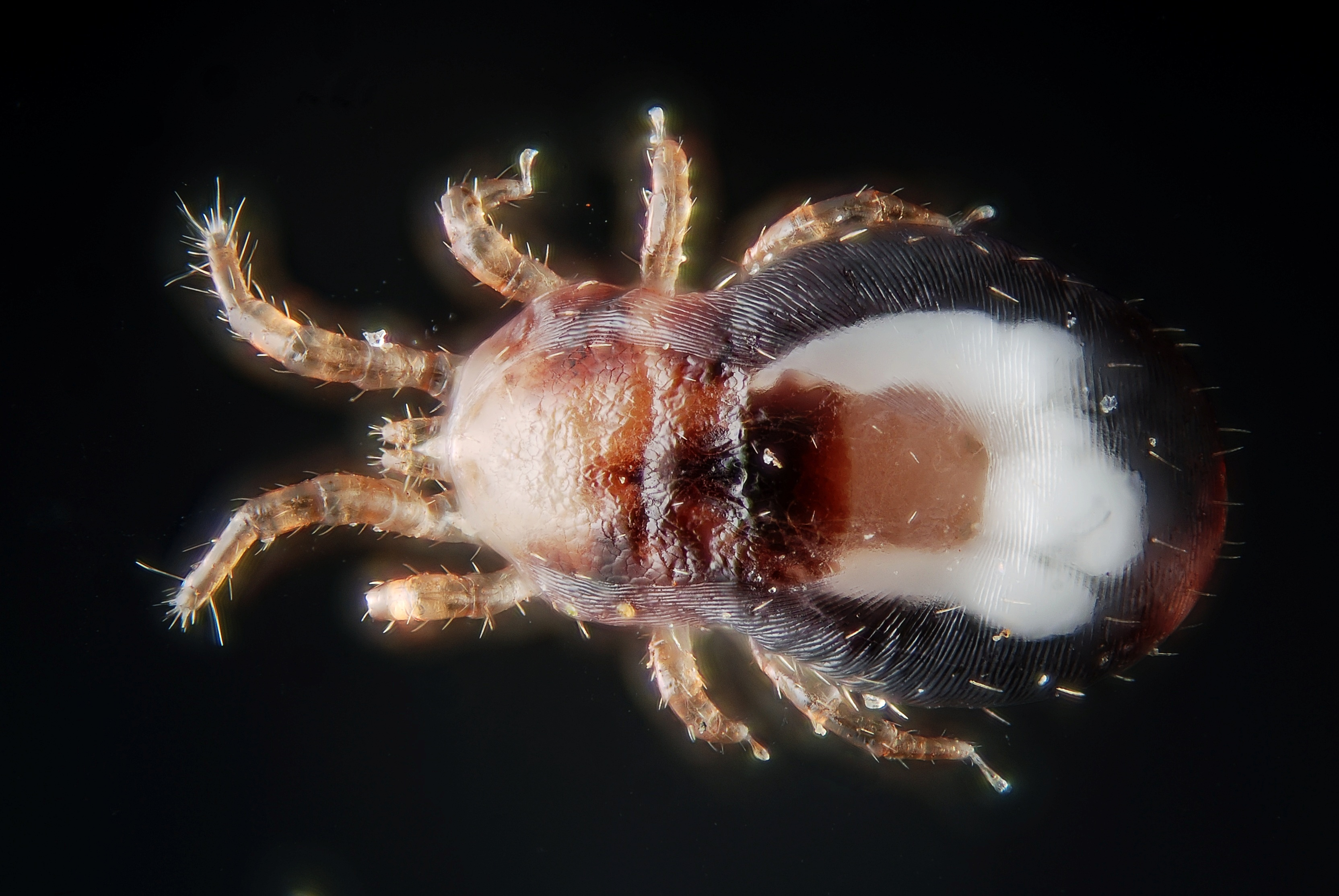

Scientific classification
- Kingdom: Animalia
- Phylum: Arthropoda
- Subphylum: Chelicerata
- Class: Arachnida
- Order: Mesostigmata
- Family: Dermanyssidae
- Genus: Dermanyssus
- Species: D. gallinae

Binomial name
- Dermanyssus gallinae (De Geer, 1778)

= Dermanyssus gallinae =

Species of mite

Dermanyssus gallinae
- Other names: Red mite, bird mite, poultry mite, red poultry mite, roost mite, chicken mite, pigeon mite
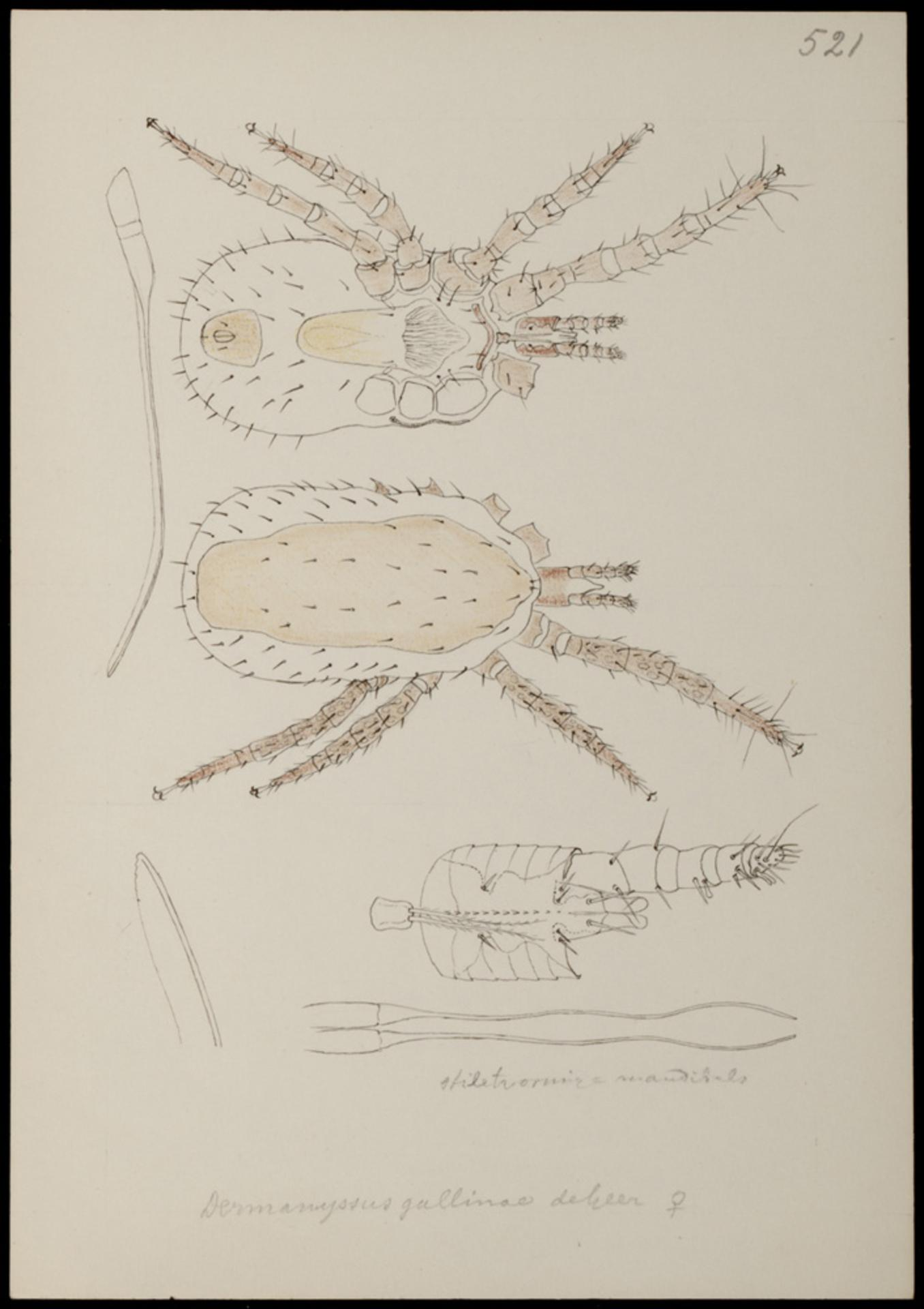
- Female Dermanyssus gallinae with "stiletto-shaped mandibles"
- Specialty: Veterinary medicine, infectious disease

Dermanyssus gallinae (also known as the red mite) is a haematophagous ectoparasite of poultry. It has been implicated as a vector of several major diseases. Despite its common names, it has a wide range of hosts including several species of wild birds and mammals, including humans, where the condition it causes is called gamasoidosis. In both size and appearance, it resembles the northern fowl mite, Ornithonyssus sylviarum.

== Description ==
Dermanyssus gallinae is an obligate blood feeder that will normally attack its host at night, but will occasionally feed during the day. Adults are 0.75–1 mm (0.030–0.039 in) long, with long legs and usually a grayish-white body, which becomes reddish-brown when engorged. After feeding, they hide in cracks and crevices away from light sources, where they mate and lay eggs. Mites progress through five life stages: egg, larva, protonymph, deutonymph and adult. Under favourable conditions this life cycle can be completed within seven days, so populations can grow rapidly, causing anaemia in badly affected flocks of poultry. Young birds are most susceptible. The mites can also affect the health of the birds indirectly, as they may serve as vectors for diseases such as Salmonellosis, avian spirochaetosis, avian influenza A virus (AIV), and Erysipelothrix rhusiopathiae. D. gallinae can survive for up to 10 months in an empty hen house. Temperatures greater than 45 °C (113 °F) and less than −20 °C (−4 °F), have been found to be lethal.

== Infestation in hens ==
=== Signs and symptoms ===
The mites normally feed around the breast and legs of hens, causing pain, irritation, and a decrease in egg production. Pustules, scabs, hyperpigmentation and feather loss may develop.

If they are present in large numbers, D. gallinae can cause anemia in hens which presents as pallor of the comb and wattle.

=== Diagnosis ===
A presumptive diagnosis can be made in flocks of laying hens, usually based on a history of decreasing egg production, anaemia and mortalities in young or ill birds. Blood spots on eggs indicate infestation within the cloaca of an affected hen. Definitive diagnosis is only achieved following identification of eggs, feces or the mites themselves.

=== Prevention ===
There are several methods for preventing infestation in hen houses including:

- Heating the henhouse to temperatures above 55 °C (131 °F).
- Regular washing down of the housing system.
- Treatment of the walls and floors with silica dust or carbolineum prior to introduction of the new hens.

=== Treatment ===
Ectoparasiticides can be used to treat affected poultry, these chemical controls, if used, should be used in rotation to avoid the buildup of resistance. Organophosphates, carbamates, and pyrethroids are widely used. The first case of pyrethroid resistance was reported by Beugnet et al 1997 and new cases continue to be reported as of 2020 by Katsavou et al 2020. The insecticide spinosad is effective against mites resistant to the veteran acaricides and can even be used on premises in the presence of the laying hens. A novel product, Exzolt was introduced in the EU in 2017, it contains fluralaner, an isoxazoline, and is highly effective against D. gallinae, included those resistant to old acaricides. It is approved for oral administration mixed with the drinking water and has a systemic mode of action, i.e. it acts through the blood of the treated birds. The macrocyclic lactones eprinomectin, moxidectin or ivermectin have been shown to impact mite reproduction and blood-meal digestion in one study, though other studies found ivermectin to be ineffective except at doses "unfavourably close to those causing toxicity".

Predatory mites such as Androlaelaps casalis and Hypoaspis miles can be used to control D. gallinae populations.

Exposing mites to carbon dioxide using dry ice and direct-spraying has been proposed as a novel treatment.

Vaccines are currently under active development for the treatment of poultry, which seek to "stimulate a protective response" in the birds and increase D. gallinae mortality.

Some plant essential oil products can act as repellents. Birkett et al 2011 and George et al 2009 identify particular plants whose EOs successfully repel D. gallinae.

== Infestation in humans ==
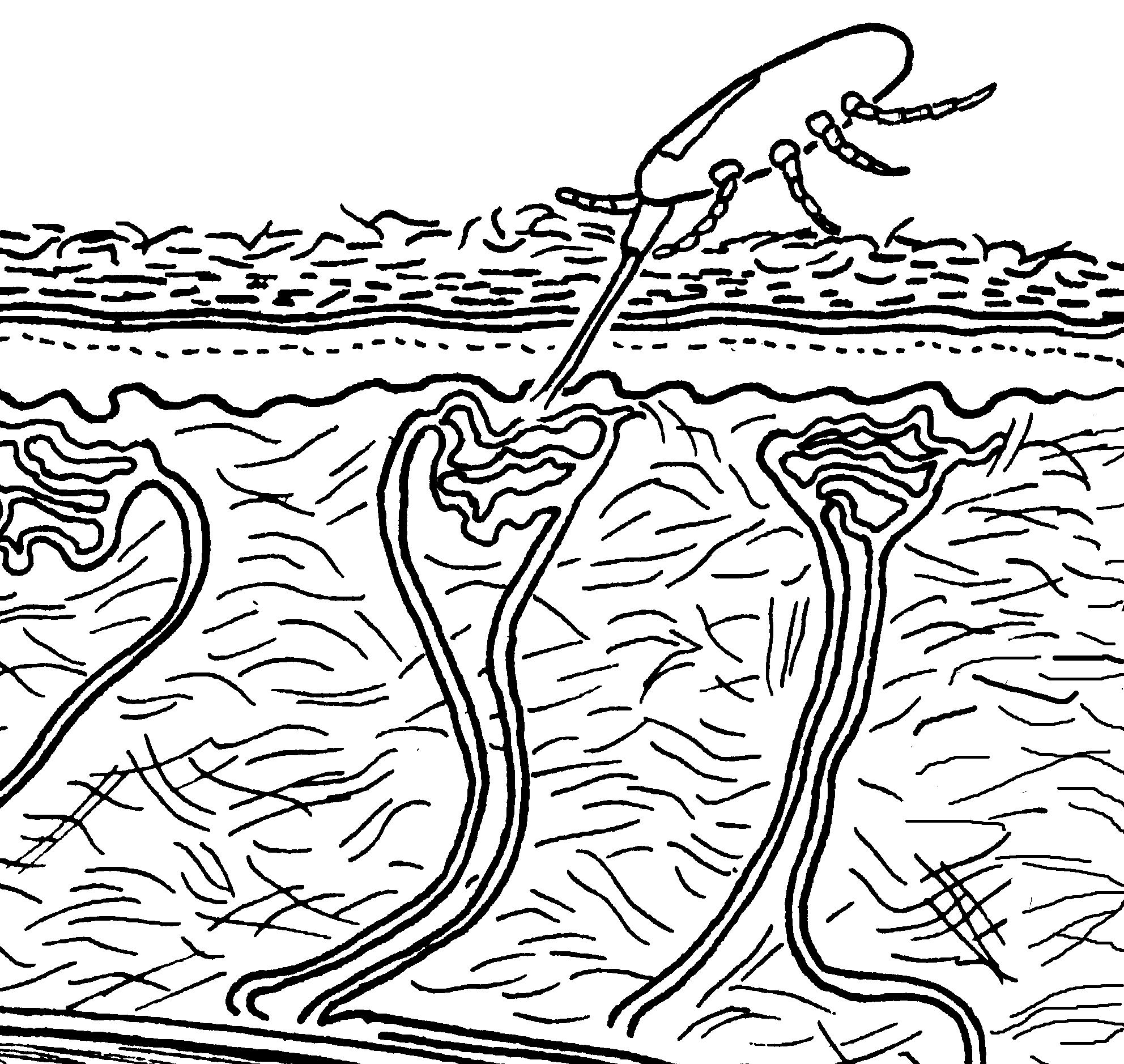
Dermanyssus gallinae piercing skin with its long chelicerae to reach dermal capillaries (not to scale).

In humans, D. gallinae infestations are known as gamasoidosis or dermanyssosis. The mites are capable of digesting and reproducing entirely on human blood, although persistent infestations are relatively rare, possible only if there are conditions caused by host immunosuppressive functions or fungal skin infections resulting in decreased immune function on the skin surface. Due to the nocturnal feeding habits of D. gallinae, infested people may experience itching and notice bites when they wake up in the morning. The severity of symptoms vary, with dermatitis, pruritus and papular urticaria being common.

Prevention of infestation in human habitation consists of eliminating potential vectors such as destroying pigeon and sparrow nests and treating infested backyard poultry.

Elimination of an infestation in a human habitation is best achieved through a combination of eliminating potential vectors (nesting pigeons, backyard poultry, etc.); reducing potential hiding places (rugs, clutter); judicious use of pesticides; consistent use of dehumidifiers to maintain a low humidity environment; maintaining a low temperature in the environment; frequent thorough cleaning; minimizing the amount of time spent in the home; and maintaining excellent hygiene.

== Infestation in other animals ==
Dermanyssus gallinae will also feed on mammals, including cats, dogs, rodents, rabbits, horses. Infestation by D. gallinae is rare in cats and dogs; usually the extremities and the back are bitten, causing itching.

== Gallery ==
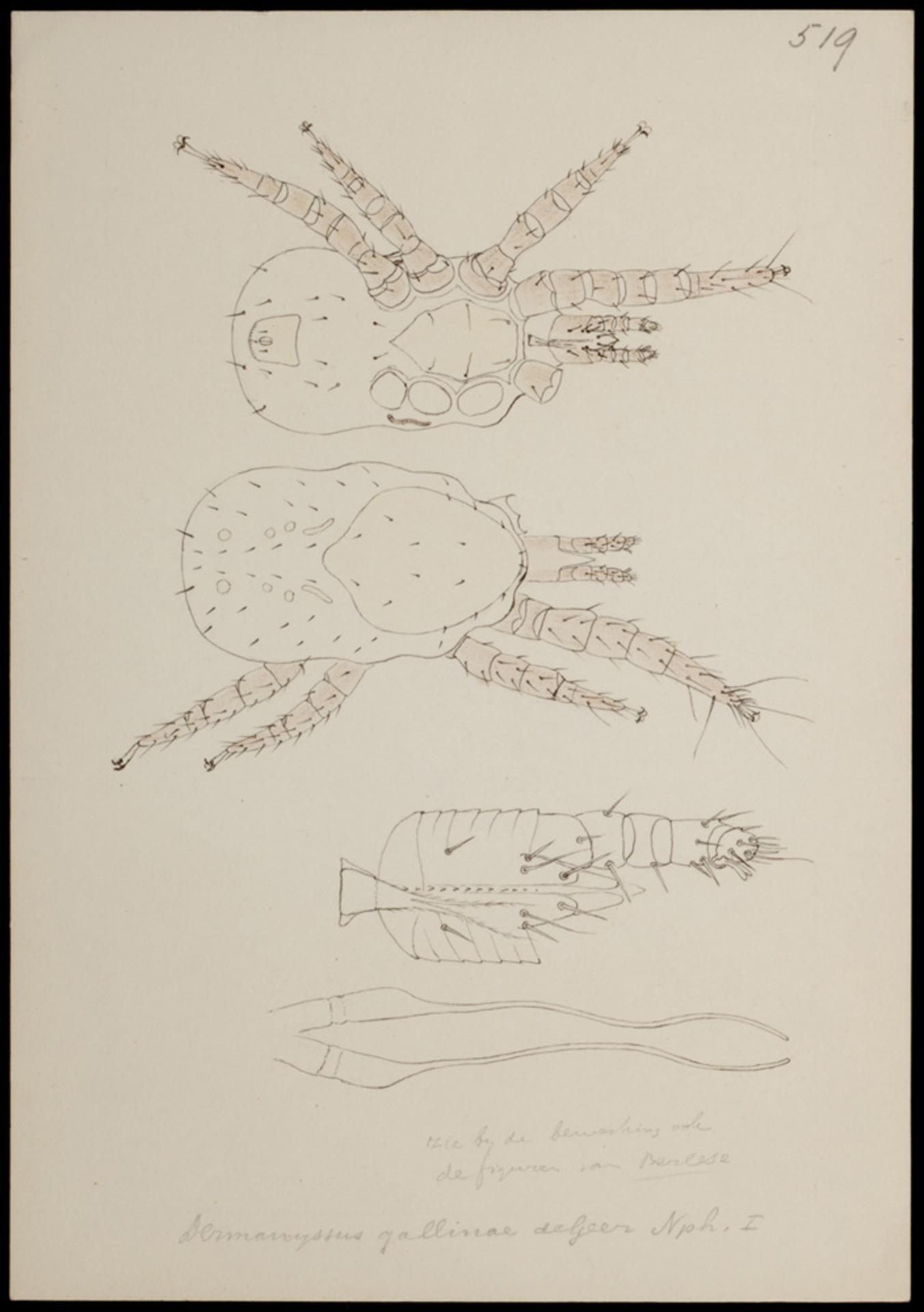
Immature form Nymph I of Dermanyssus gallinae by A.C. Oudemans

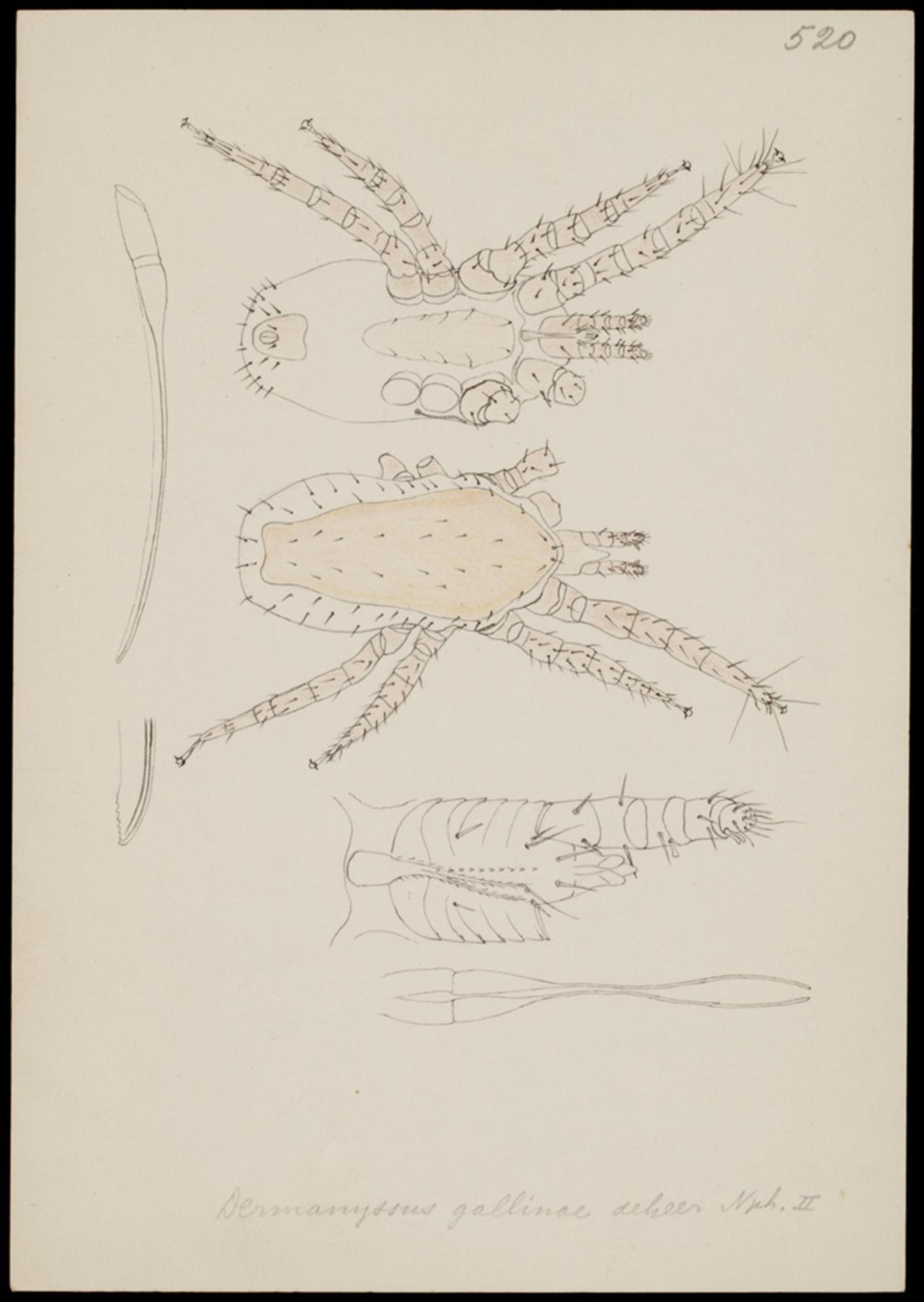
Immature form Nymph II of Dermanyssus gallinae by A.C. Oudemans

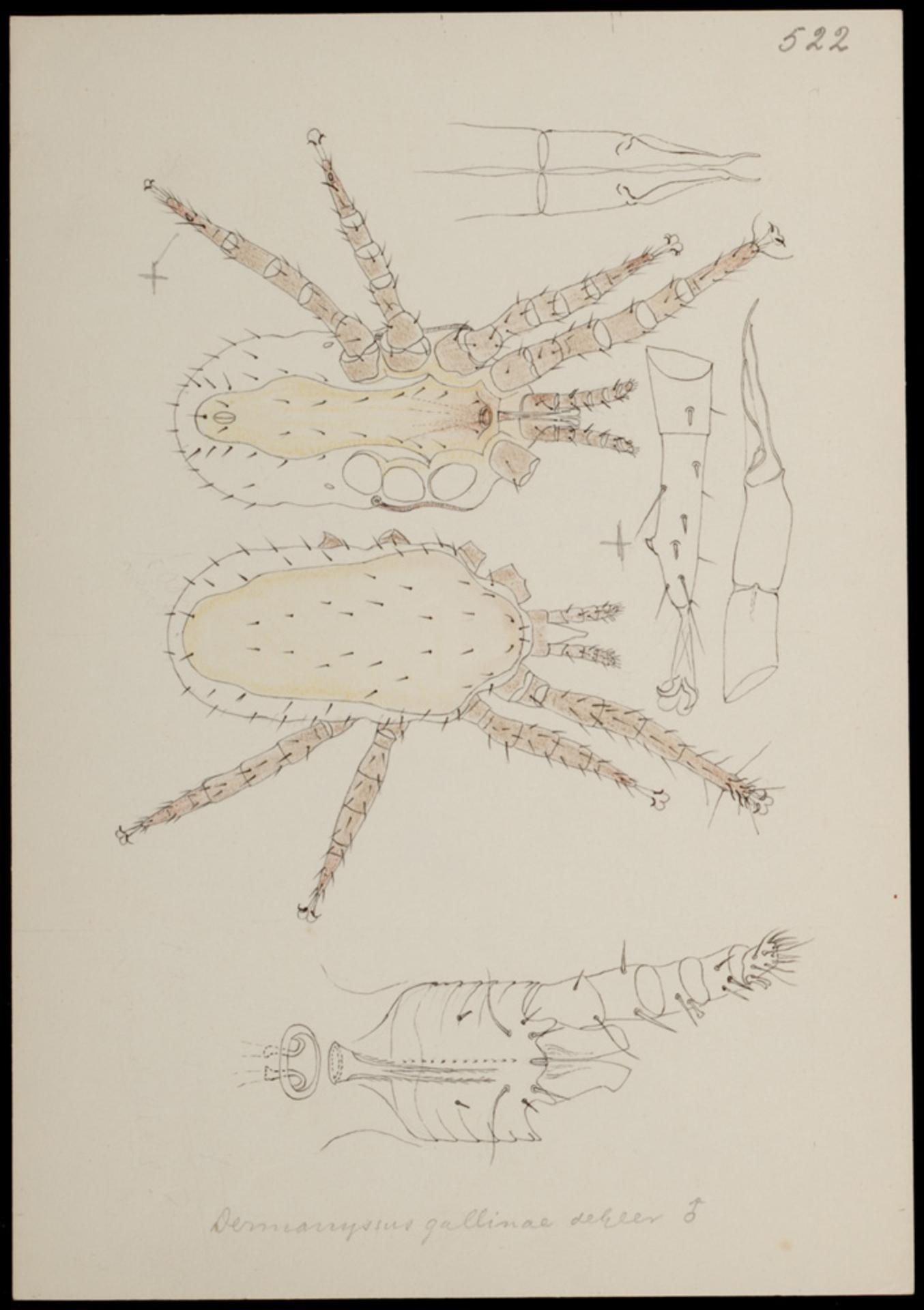
Male Dermanyssus gallinae by A.C. Oudemans

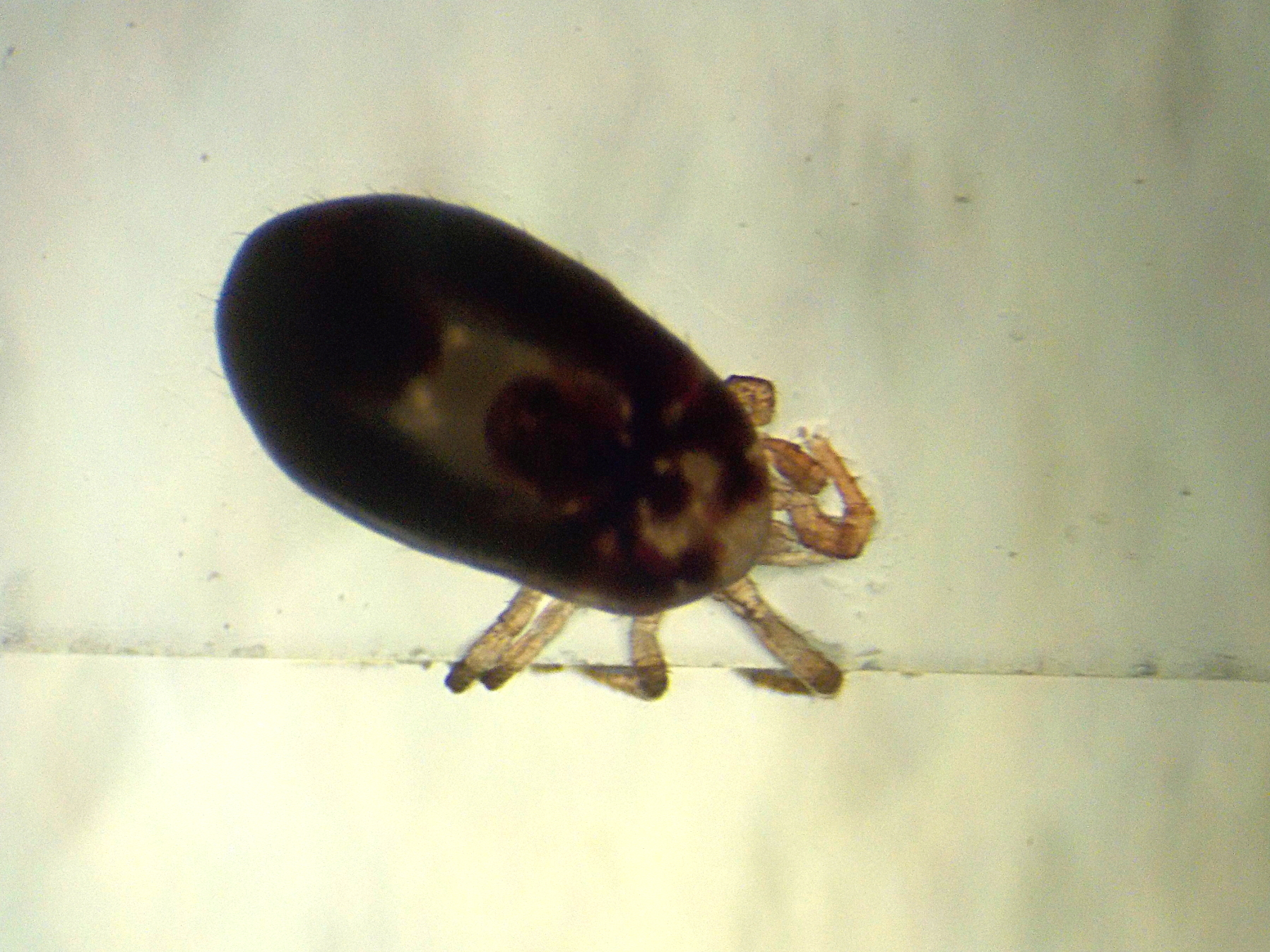
Red mite (Dermanyssus gallinae) from a hen, microscopic view

== See also ==
- Acariasis
- Gamasoidosis
- List of mites associated with cutaneous reactions
