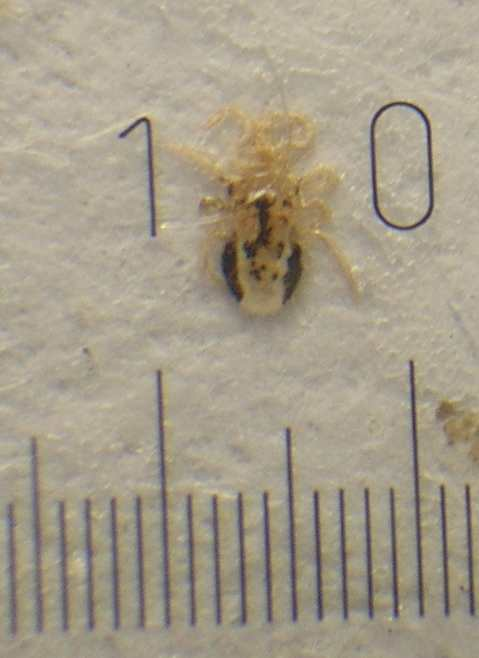
- Ornithonyssus sylviarum. Scale 1/10 mm, i. e. animal size is about 0.8 mm.

Scientific classification
- Kingdom: Animalia
- Phylum: Arthropoda
- Subphylum: Chelicerata
- Class: Arachnida
- Order: Mesostigmata
- Family: Macronyssidae
- Genus: Ornithonyssus
- Species: O. sylviarum

Binomial name
- Ornithonyssus sylviarum (G. Canestrini & Fanzago, 1877)

= Ornithonyssus sylviarum =

Species of mite

Ornithonyssus sylviarum (also known as the northern fowl mite) is a haematophagous ectoparasite of poultry. In both size and appearance, it resembles the red mite, Dermanyssus gallinae. They primarily infect egg laying chickens. They contribute to economic damage and feed on their host's blood which leads to lowering the egg production and feed conversion efficiency. Anemia or death can be an effect of a high amount of infestation within the birds. While they mainly do target wild birds they can also become permanent ectoparasites in the domestic poultry. The main nesting sites are generally in a close proximity to poultry coops.

This blood-feeding parasite is broadly distributed, and has been reported on 72 host species of North American birds in 26 families. The mites have been a major pest of the poultry industry since the early 1900s. The spread of these mites are mainly because they have the ability to hide in cracks or wild birds nests. In relation to humans they can hide in equipment and rodents. They have a high range of widespread in places like North America, Brazil, Australia, and China.”

== See also ==
- Acariasis
- Gamasoidosis
- List of mites associated with cutaneous reactions
