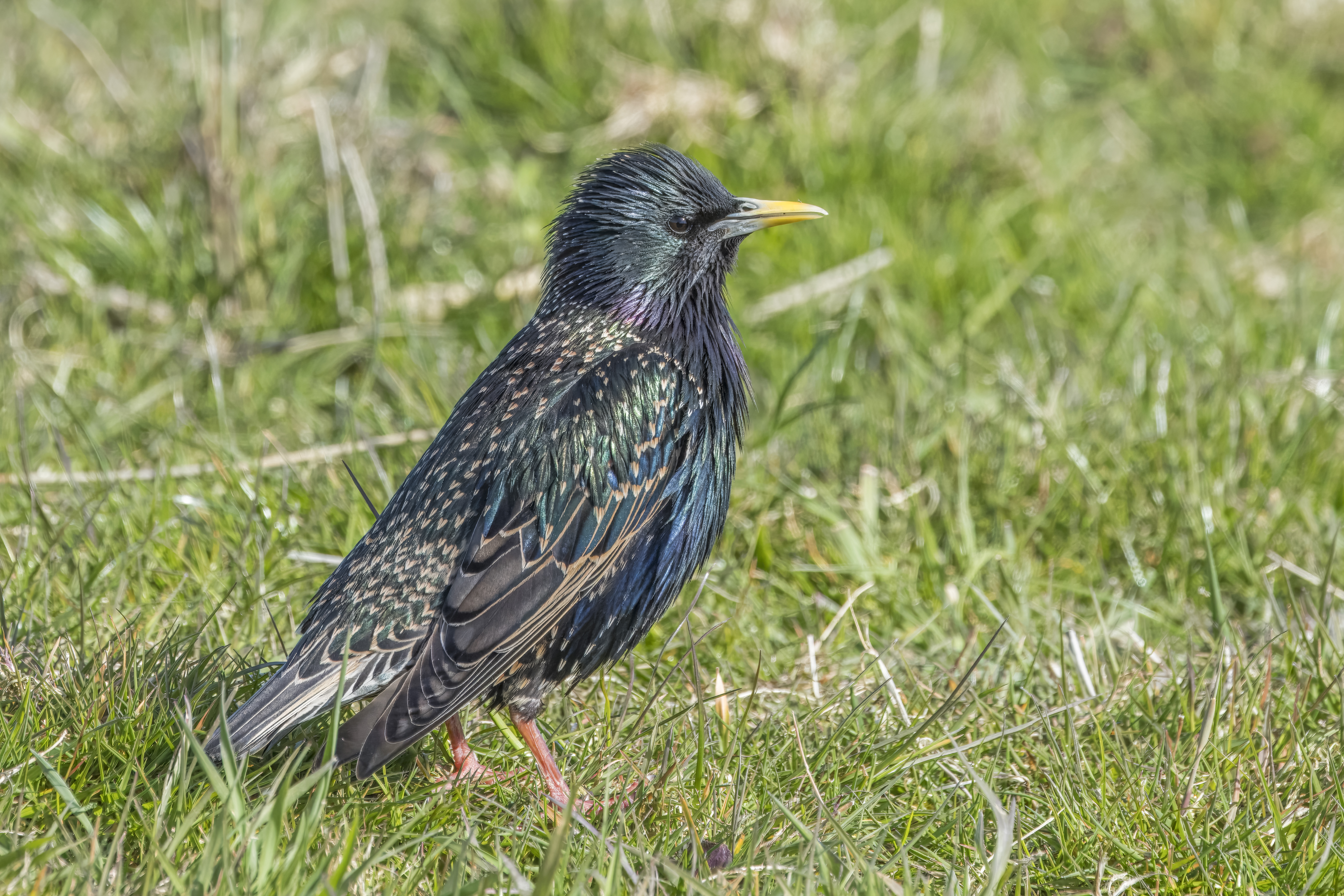
- Adult in breeding plumage
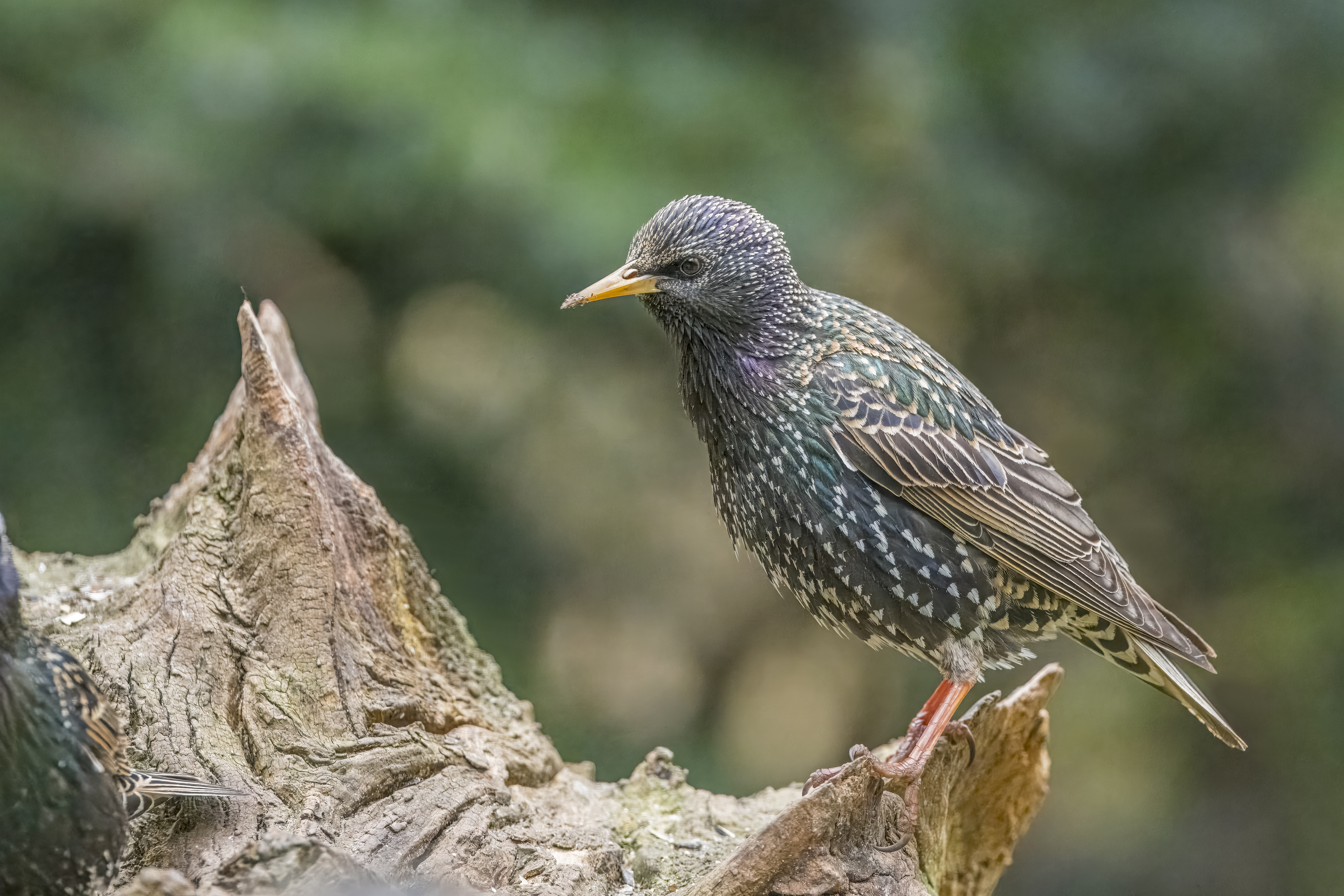
- Adult in non-breeding plumage both S. v. vulgaris in the Netherlands The song of a common starling

Conservation status
- Least Concern (IUCN 3.1)

Scientific classification
- Kingdom: Animalia
- Phylum: Chordata
- Class: Aves
- Order: Passeriformes
- Family: Sturnidae
- Genus: Sturnus
- Species: S. vulgaris

Binomial name
- Sturnus vulgaris Linnaeus, 1758
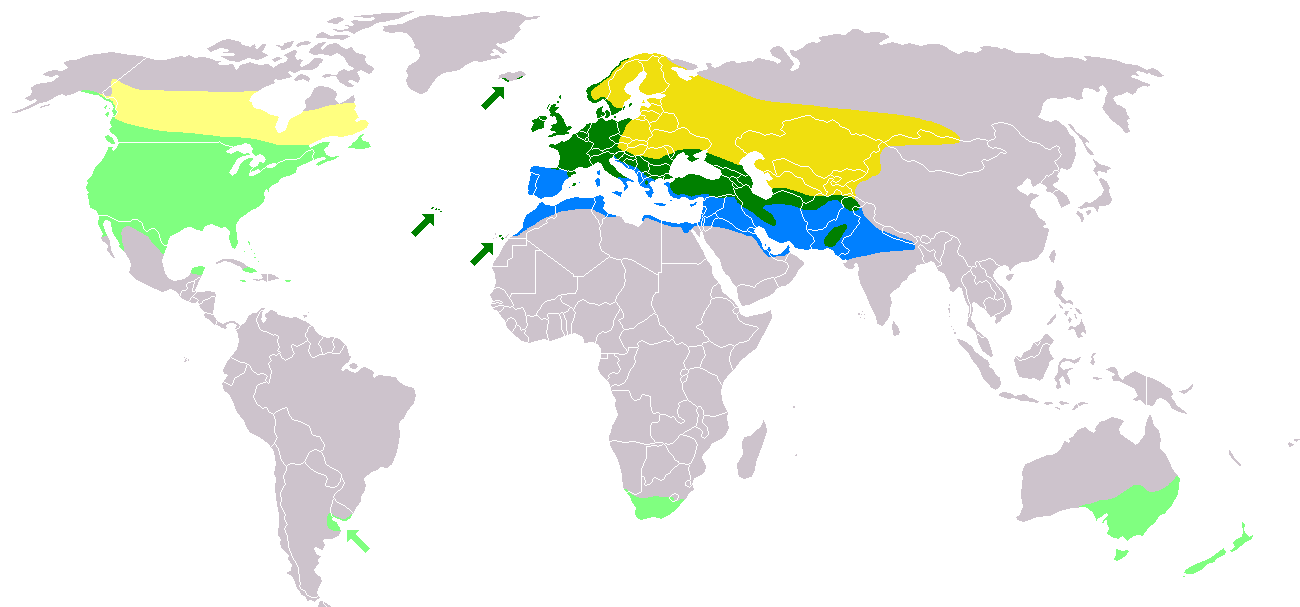
- Native: Summer visitor Resident Winter visitor Introduced: Summer visitor Resident

= Common starling =

Species of passerine birds

The common starling (Sturnus vulgaris), also known simply as the starling in Great Britain and Ireland, and as the European starling in North America, is a medium-sized passerine bird in the starling family, Sturnidae. It is about 20 cm (8 in) long and has glossy black plumage with a metallic sheen, which is speckled with white at some times of the year. The legs are pink and the bill is black in winter and yellow in summer; young birds have browner plumage than the adults. Its gift for mimicry has been noted in literature including the Mabinogion and the works of Pliny the Elder and William Shakespeare.

The common starling has about 12 subspecies breeding in open habitats across its native range in temperate Europe and across the Palearctic to western Mongolia, and it has been introduced as an invasive species to Australia, New Zealand, Canada, the United States, Mexico, Argentina, South Africa and Fiji. This bird is resident in western and southern Europe and southwestern Asia, while northeastern populations migrate south and west in the winter within the breeding range and also further south to Iberia and North Africa. The common starling builds an untidy nest in a natural or artificial cavity in which four or five glossy, pale blue eggs are laid. These take two weeks to hatch and the young remain in the nest for another three weeks. There are normally one or two breeding attempts each year. This species is omnivorous, taking a wide range of invertebrates, as well as seeds and fruit. It is hunted by various mammals and birds of prey, and is host to a range of external and internal parasites.

Large flocks typical of this species can be beneficial to agriculture by controlling invertebrate pests; however, starlings can also be pests themselves when they feed on fruit and sprouting crops. Common starlings may also be a nuisance through the noise and mess caused by their large urban roosts. Introduced populations in particular have been subjected to a range of controls, including culling, but these have had limited success, except in preventing the colonisation of Western Australia.

The species has declined in numbers in parts of northern and western Europe since the 1980s due to fewer grassland invertebrates being available as food for growing chicks. Despite this, its huge global population is not thought to be declining significantly, and the common starling is classified as being of least concern by the International Union for Conservation of Nature.

== Taxonomy and systematics ==
The common starling was first described by Carl Linnaeus in his Systema Naturae in 1758 under its current binomial name. Sturnus and vulgaris are derived from the Latin for "starling" and "common" respectively. The Old English staer, later stare, and the Latin sturnus are both derived from an unknown Indo-European root dating back to the second millennium BC, imitative of the bird's call. "Starling" was first recorded in the 11th century, when it referred to the juvenile of the species, but by the 16th century it had already largely supplanted "stare" to refer to birds of all ages. The older name is referenced in William Butler Yeats' poem "The Stare's Nest by My Window". The International Ornithological Congress's preferred English vernacular name is common starling.

The starling family, Sturnidae, is an entirely Old World group apart from introductions elsewhere, with the greatest numbers of species in Southeast Asia and sub-Saharan Africa. The genus Sturnus is polyphyletic and relationships between its members are not fully resolved. The closest relative of the common starling is the spotless starling (Sturnus unicolor). The non-migratory spotless starling may be descended from a population of ancestral S. vulgaris that survived in an Iberian refugium during an Ice Age retreat, and mitochondrial gene studies suggest that it could be considered a subspecies of the common starling. There is more genetic variation between common starling populations than between the nominate common starling and the spotless starling. Although common starling remains are known from the Middle Pleistocene, part of the problem in resolving relationships in the Sturnidae is the paucity of the fossil record for the family as a whole.

=== Subspecies ===
There are several subspecies of the common starling, which vary clinally in size and the colour tone of the adult plumage. The gradual variation over geographic range and extensive intergradation means that acceptance of the various subspecies varies between authorities.

Subspecies

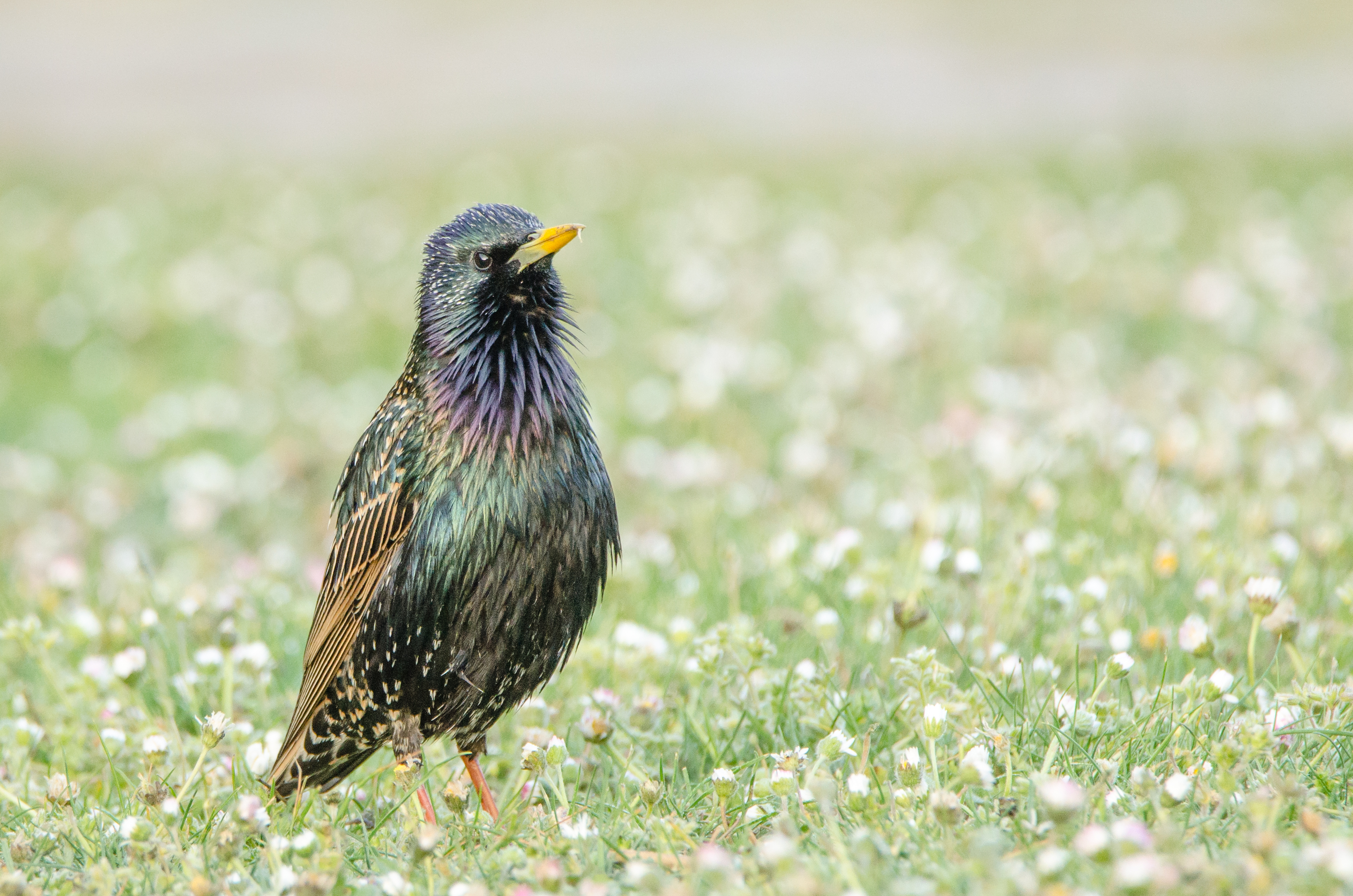
S. v. vulgaris in Düsseldorf, Germany

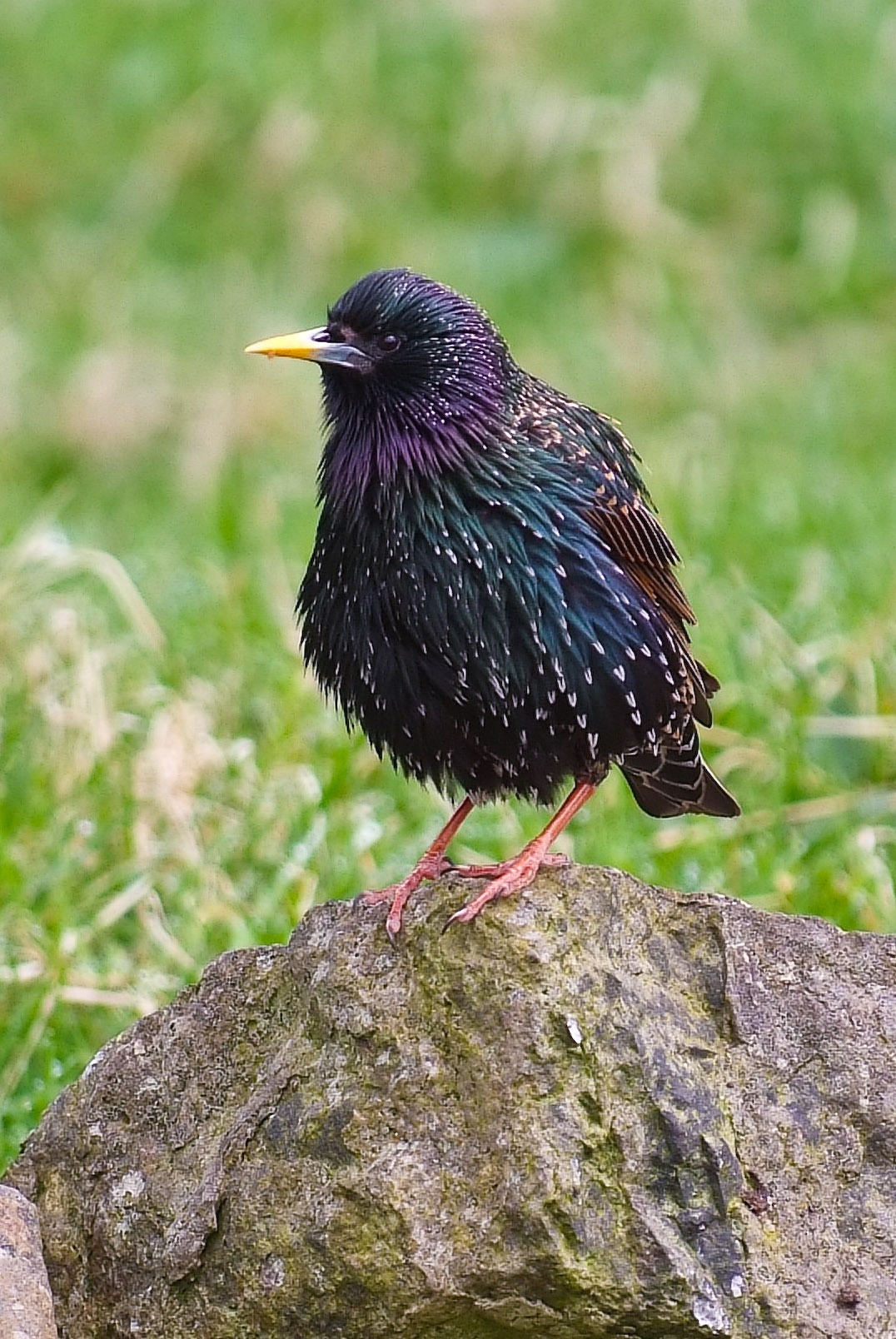
S. v. faroensis in the Faroe Islands

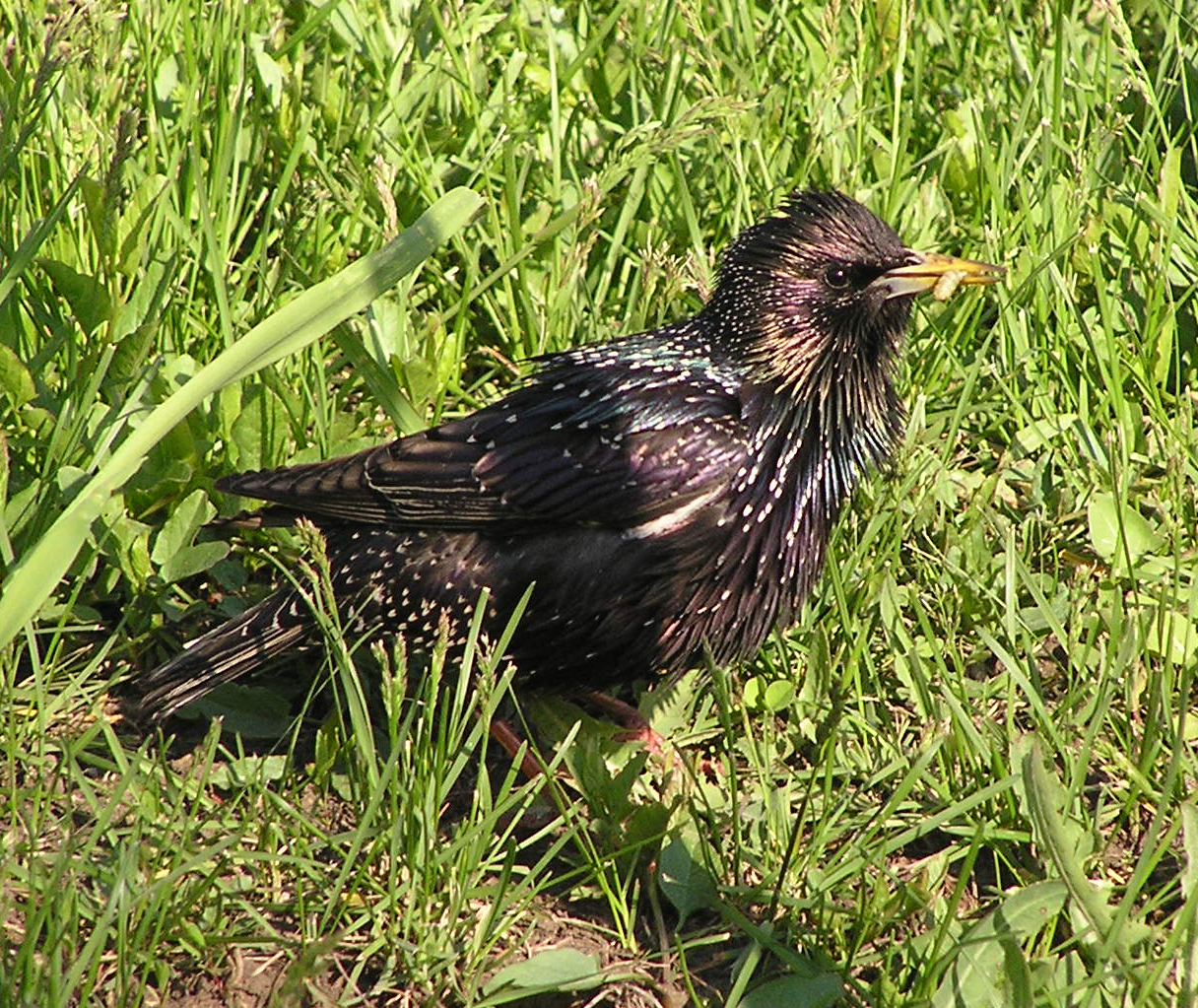
S. v. tauricus in Donetsk, Ukraine

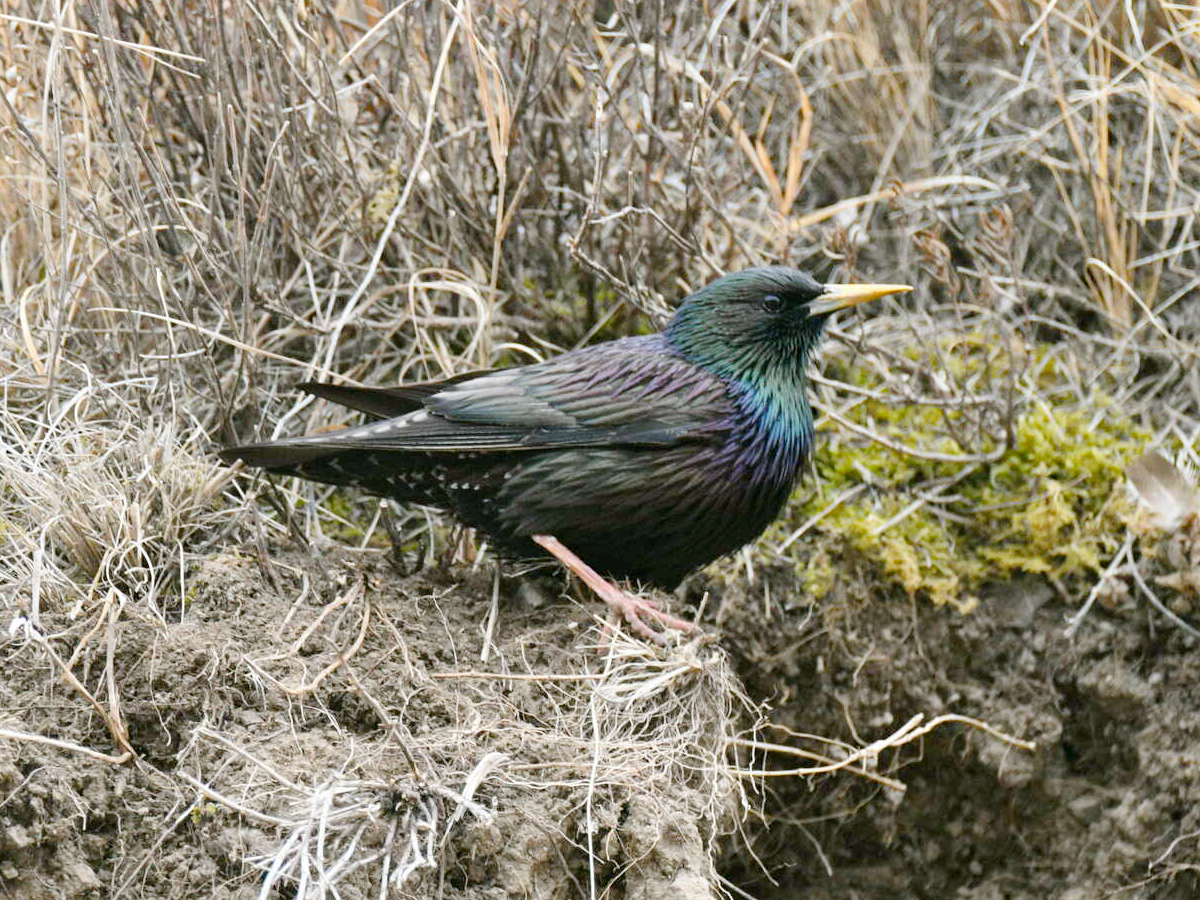
S. v. porphyronotus near Almaty, Kazakhstan

Subspecies (Note: The table is based on Feare & Craig (1998).)
Subspecies	Authority	Range	Comments
S. v. vulgaris	Linnaeus, 1758	Most of Europe, except the far northwest and far southeast; also Iceland and the Canary Islands. Introduced to North America.	The nominate subspecies.
S. v. faroensis	Feilden, 1872	Faroe Islands	Slightly larger than nominate, especially in the bill and feet. Adult with darker and duller green gloss and far less spotting, even in fresh plumage. Juvenile sooty black with whitish chin and areas on the belly; the throat spotted black.
S. v. zetlandicus	Hartert, EJO, 1918	Shetland Islands	Like S. v. faroensis, but intermediate in size between that subspecies and S. v. vulgaris. Birds from Fair Isle, St. Kilda and the Outer Hebrides are intermediate between this subspecies and the nominate and placement with S. v. vulgaris or S. v. zetlandicus varies according to the authority.
S. v. granti	Hartert, EJO, 1903	Azores	Like the nominate, but smaller, especially the feet. Often strong purple gloss on the upperparts.
S. v. poltaratskyi	Finsch, 1878	Eastern Bashkortostan eastwards through the Ural Mountains and central Siberia, to Lake Baikal and western Mongolia	Like the nominate, but gloss on the head predominantly purple, on the back green, on the flanks usually purplish-blue, on the upper wing-coverts bluish-green. In flight, conspicuous light cinnamon-buff fringes to the under wing-coverts and axillaries; these areas may appear very pale in fresh plumage.
S. v. tauricus	Buturlin, 1904	From Crimea and east of the Dnieper River eastwards around the coast of the Black Sea to western Asia Minor. Not found in the uplands, where it is replaced by S. v. purpurascens.	Like the nominate, but decidedly long-winged. Gloss of the head green, of the body bronze-purple, of the flanks and upper wing-coverts greenish-bronze. The underwings blackish with pale fringes of the coverts. Nearly spotless in breeding plumage.
S. v. purpurascens	Gould, 1868	Eastern Turkey to Tbilisi and Lake Sevan, in the uplands on the eastern shore of the Black Sea, replacing tauricus	Like the nominate, but the wings longer and green gloss restricted to the ear-coverts, neck and upper chest. Purple gloss elsewhere except on the flanks and upper wing-coverts, where it is more bronzy. Dark underwings with slim white fringes to the coverts.
S. v. caucasicus	Lorenz, T, 1887	Volga Delta through the eastern Caucasus and adjacent areas	Green gloss on the head and back, purple gloss on the neck and belly, more bluish on the upper wing-coverts. The underwings like S. v. purpurascens.
S. v. porphyronotus	Sharpe, 1888	Western Central Asia, grading into S. v. poltaratskyi between the Dzungarian Alatau and the Altai Mountains	Very similar to S. v. tauricus, and like it, nearly spotless in breeding plumage, but smaller and completely allopatric, being separated by S. v. purpurascens, S. v. caucasicus and S. v. nobilior.
S. v. nobilior	Hume, 1879	Afghanistan, southeastern Turkmenistan and adjacent Uzbekistan to eastern Iran	Like S. v. purpurascens, but smaller and the wings shorter; the ear-coverts glossed purple, and the underside and upperwing gloss quite reddish.
S. v. humii	Brooks, WE, 1876	Kashmir to Nepal	Small; purple gloss restricted to the neck area and sometimes the flanks to the tail-coverts, otherwise glossed green. This is sometimes treated under the name S. v. indicus given by Hodgson. (Note: This form was described by Hodgson as S. indicus in Gray's Zoological Miscellany of 1831, and may have taxonomic priority over S. v. humii.)
S. v. minor	Hume, 1873	Pakistan	Small; green gloss restricted to the head and lower belly and back, otherwise glossed purple.

Birds from Fair Isle, St. Kilda and the Outer Hebrides are intermediate in size between S. v. zetlandicus and the nominate subspecies, and their subspecies placement varies according to the authority. The dark juveniles typical of these island forms are occasionally found in mainland Scotland and elsewhere, indicating some gene flow from S. v. faroensis or S. v. zetlandicus, subspecies formerly considered to be isolated.

Several other subspecies have been named, but are generally no longer considered valid. Most are intergrades that occur where the ranges of various subspecies meet. These include: S. v. ruthenus Menzbier, 1891 and S. v. jitkowi Buturlin, 1904, which are intergrades between S. v. vulgaris and S. v. poltaratskyi from western Russia; S. v. graecus Tschusi, 1905 and S. v. balcanicus Buturlin and Harms, 1909, which are intergrades between S. v. vulgaris and S. v. tauricus from the southern Balkans to central Ukraine and throughout Greece to the Bosporus; and S. v. heinrichi Stresemann, 1928, an intergrade between S. v. caucasicus and S. v. nobilior in northern Iran. S. v. persepolis Ticehurst, 1928 from Fars province in southern Iran is very similar to S. v. vulgaris, and it is not clear whether it is a distinct resident population or simply migrants from southeastern Europe.

== Description ==
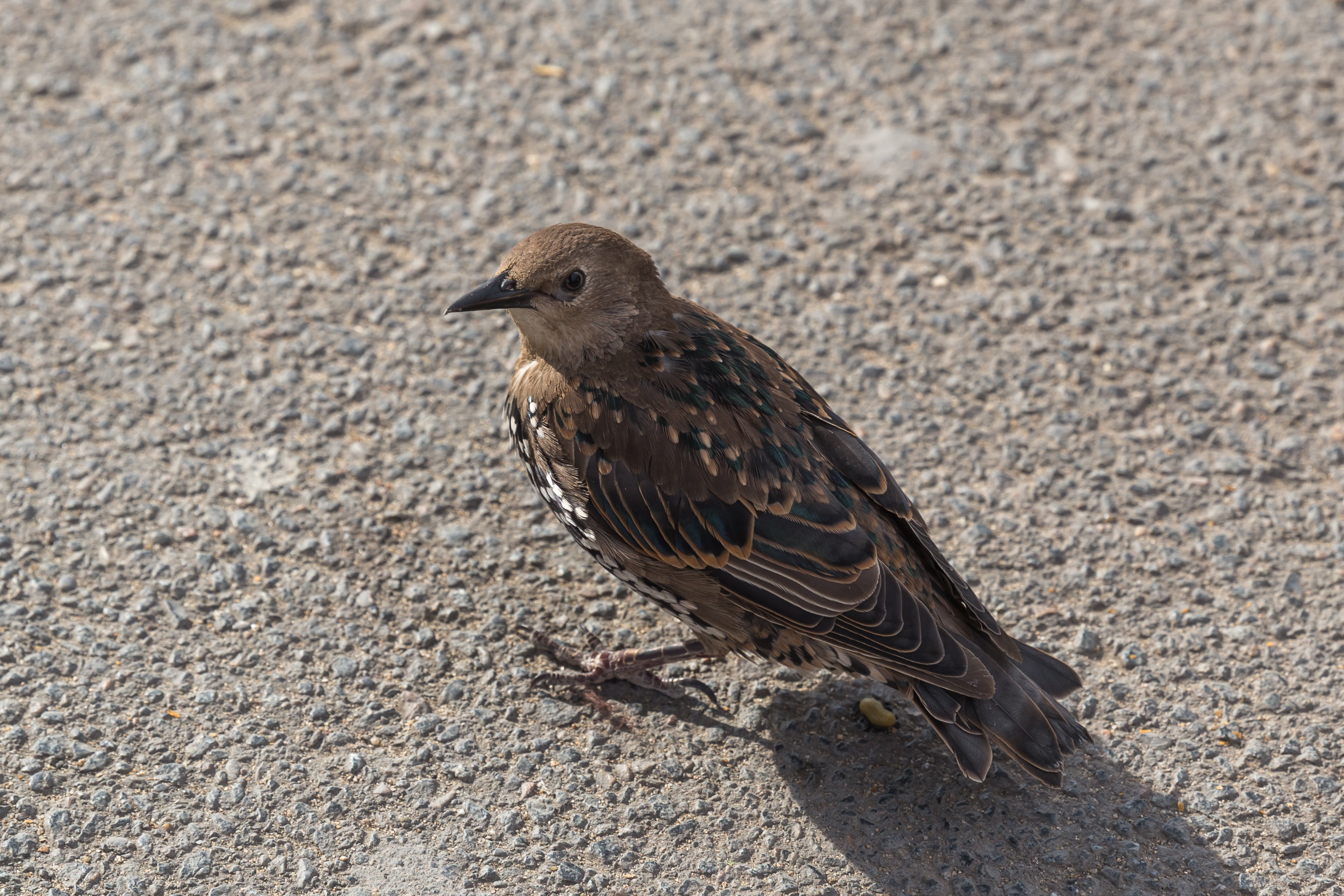
An immature in Paris, France. It has partly moulted into its first-winter plumage; however, juvenile brown plumage is prominent on its head and neck.

The common starling is 19–23 cm (7.5–9.1 in) long, with a wingspan of 31–44 cm (12–17 in) and a weight of 58–101 g (2.0–3.6 oz). Among standard measurements, the wing chord is 11.8 to 13.8 cm (4.6 to 5.4 in), the tail is 5.8 to 6.8 cm (2.3 to 2.7 in), the culmen is 2.5 to 3.2 cm (0.98 to 1.26 in) and the tarsus is 2.7 to 3.2 cm (1.1 to 1.3 in). The plumage is iridescent black, glossed purple or green, and spangled with white, especially in winter. The underparts of adult male common starlings are less spotted than those of adult females at a given time of year. The throat feathers of males are long and loose and are used in display while those of females are smaller and more pointed. The legs are stout, pinkish- or greyish-red in the breding season, and slightly darker in winter. The bill is narrow and conical with a sharp tip; in the winter it is brownish-black but in summer, females have lemon yellow beaks with pink bases while males have yellow bills with blue-grey bases. Moulting occurs once a year in late summer after the breeding season has finished; the fresh feathers are prominently tipped white (breast feathers) or buff (wing and back feathers), which gives the bird a speckled appearance. The reduction in the spotting in the breeding season is achieved through the white feather tips largely wearing off. Juveniles are grey-brown and by their first winter resemble adults though often retaining some brown juvenile feathering, especially on the head. They can usually be sexed by the colour of the irises, rich brown in males, mouse-brown or grey in females. Estimating the contrast between the iris and the central always-dark pupil is 97% accurate in determining sex, rising to 98% if the length of the throat feathers is also considered. The common starling is mid-sized by both starling standards and passerine standards. It is readily distinguished from most other mid-sized passerines, such as thrushes, icterids or small corvids, by its relatively short tail, sharp, blade-like bill, round-bellied shape and strong, sizeable (and rufous-coloured) legs. In flight, its strongly pointed wings and dark colour are distinctive, while on the ground its strange, somewhat waddling gait is also characteristic. The colouring and build usually distinguish this bird from other starlings, although the closely related spotless starling may be distinguished by the lack of pale feather tip spots in adult breeding plumage. The bohemian waxwing is structurally very similar in flight and also flies in dense flocks; it can be distinguished by being a paler reddish buff colour, marginally smaller, and also has a very different flight call.

Like most terrestrial starlings the common starling moves by walking or running, rather than hopping. Their flight is quite strong and direct; their triangular wings beat very rapidly, and periodically the birds glide for a short way without losing much height before resuming powered flight. When in a flock, the birds take off almost simultaneously, wheel and turn in unison, form a compact mass or trail off into a wispy stream, bunch up again and land in a coordinated fashion. Common starling on migration can fly at 60–80 km/h (37–50 mph) and cover up to 1,000–1,500 km (620–930 mi).

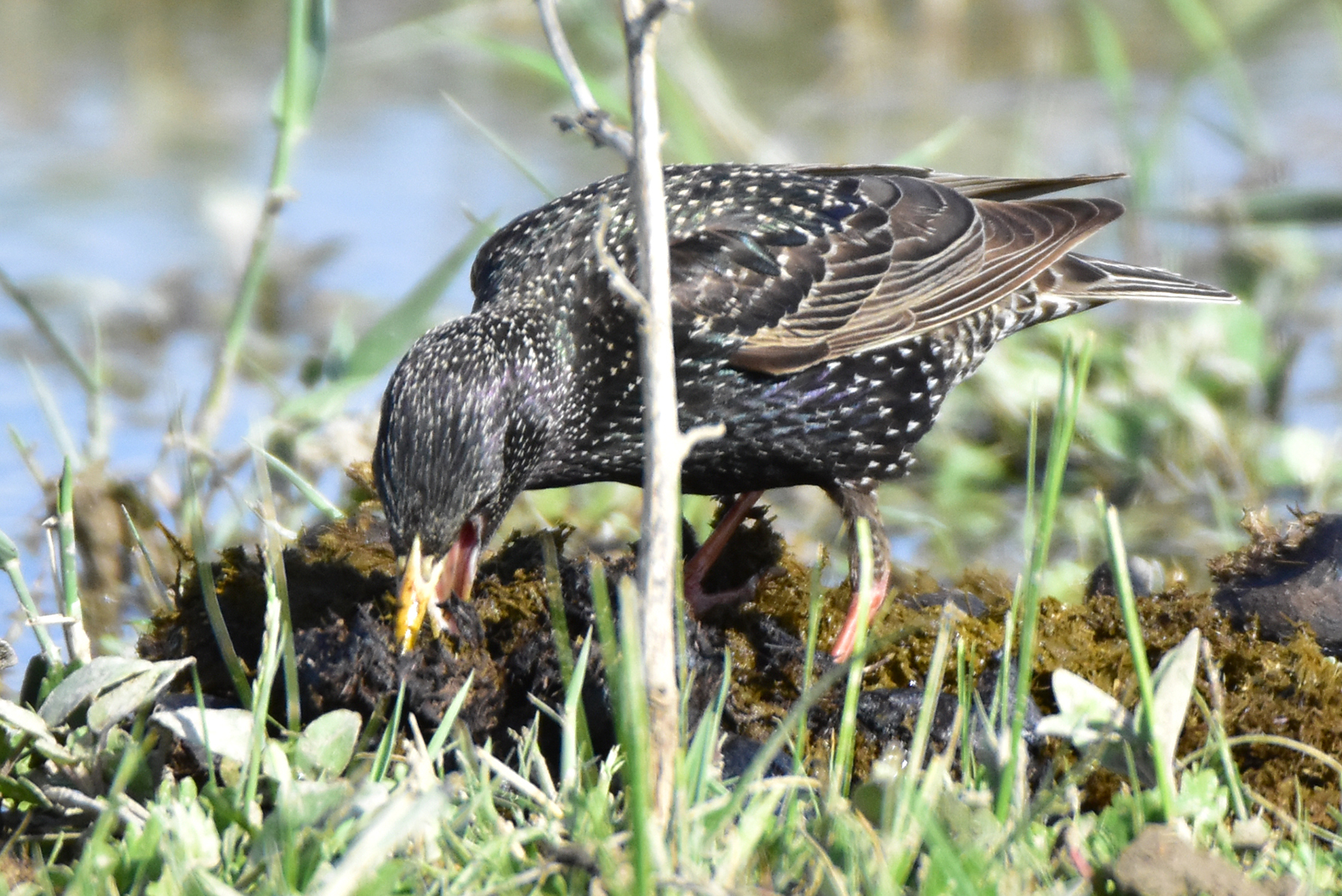
A common starling (S. v. porphyronotus, in Kazakhstan) using the protractor muscles in its jaw to force apart a cowpat to search for insect larvae

Several terrestrial starlings, including those in the genus Sturnus, have adaptations of the skull and muscles that help with feeding by probing. This adaptation is most strongly developed in the common starling (along with the spotless and white-cheeked starlings), where the protractor muscles responsible for opening the jaw are enlarged and the skull is narrow, allowing the eye to be moved forward to peer down the length of the bill. This technique involves inserting the bill into the ground and opening it as a way of searching for hidden food items. Common starlings have the physical traits that enable them to use this feeding technique, which has undoubtedly helped the species spread far and wide.

In Iberia, the western Mediterranean and northwest Africa, the common starling may be confused with the closely related spotless starling, the plumage of which, as its name implies, has a more uniform colour. At close range it can be seen that the latter has longer throat feathers, a fact particularly noticeable when it sings.

=== Song and calls ===
Chattering calls of a group

The common starling is noisy, its song consisting of a wide variety of both melodic and mechanical-sounding noises as part of a ritual succession of sounds. The male is the main songster and engages in bouts of song lasting for a minute or more. Each of these typically includes four varieties of song type, which follow each other in a regular order without pause. The bout starts with a series of pure-tone whistles and these are followed by the main part of the song, a number of variable sequences that often incorporate snatches of song mimicked from other species of bird and various naturally occurring or man-made noises. The structure and simplicity of the sound mimicked is of greater importance than the frequency with which it occurs. In some instances, a wild starling has been observed to mimic a sound it has heard only once. Each sound clip is repeated several times before the bird moves on to the next. After this variable section comes a number of types of repeated clicks followed by a final burst of high-frequency song, again formed of several types. Each bird has its own repertoire with more proficient birds having a range of up to 35 variable song types and as many as 14 types of clicks.

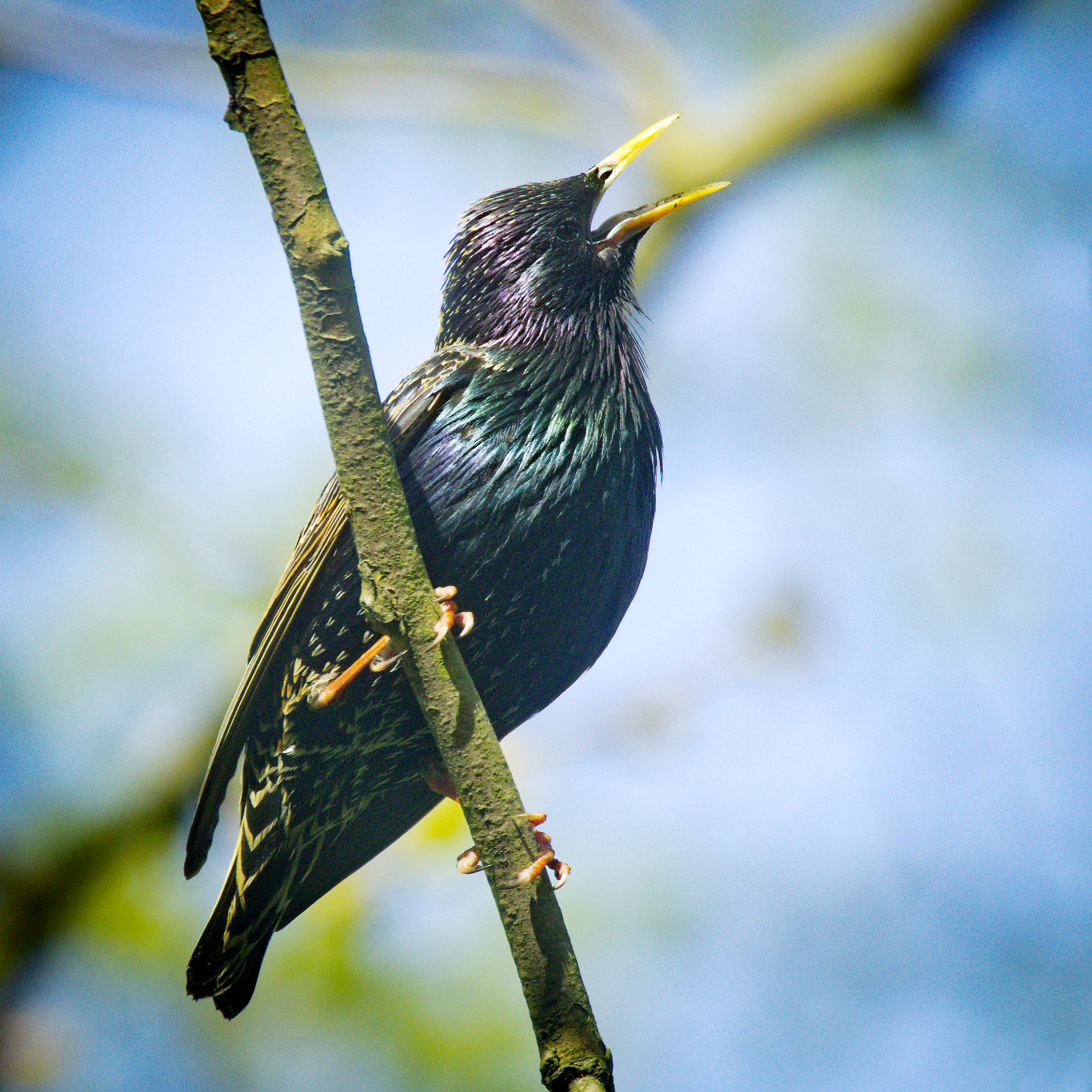
Singing Sturnus vulgaris, Wrocław, Poland

Males sing constantly as the breeding period approaches and perform less often once pairs have bonded. In the presence of a female, a male sometimes flies to his nest and sings from the entrance, apparently attempting to entice the female in. Older birds tend to have a wider repertoire than younger ones. Those males that engage in longer bouts of singing and that have wider repertoires attract mates earlier and have greater reproductive success than others. Females appear to prefer mates with more complex songs, perhaps because this indicates greater experience or longevity. Having a complex song is also useful in defending a territory and deterring less experienced males from encroaching.

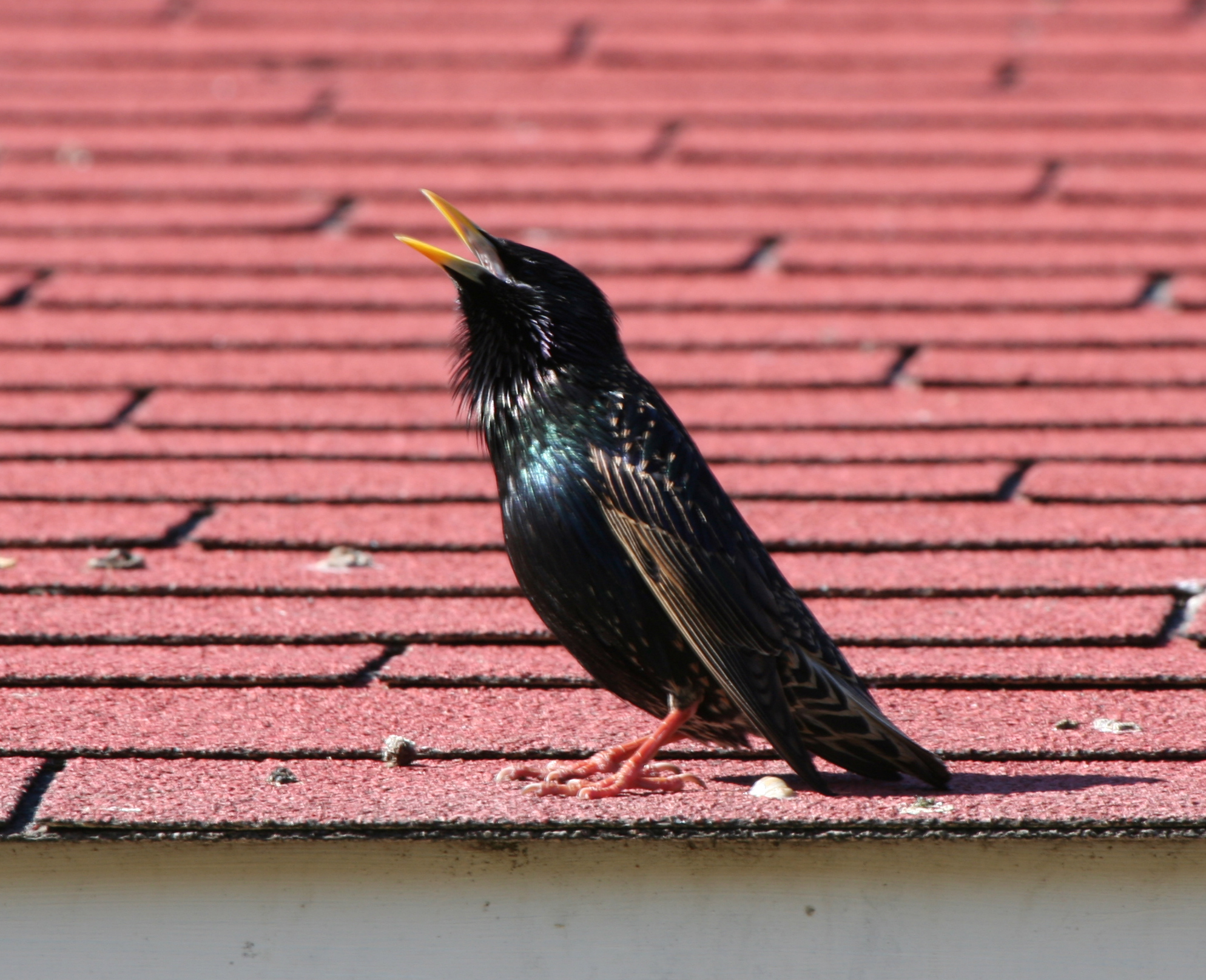
Adult male singing and displaying its long throat feathers

Along with having adaptions of the skull and muscles for singing, male starlings also have a much larger syrinx than females. This is due to increased muscle mass and enlarged elements of the syringeal skeleton. The male starling's syrinx is around 35% larger than its female counterpart. However, this sexual dimorphism is less pronounced than it is in songbird species like the zebra finch, where the male's syrinx is 100% larger than the female's syrinx.

Singing also occurs outside the breeding season, taking place throughout the year apart from the moulting period. The songsters are more commonly male although females also sing on occasion. The function of such out-of-season song is poorly understood. Eleven other types of call have been described including a flock call, threat call, attack call, snarl call and copulation call. The alarm call is a harsh scream, and while foraging together common starlings squabble incessantly. They chatter while roosting and bathing, making a great deal of noise that can cause irritation to people living nearby. When a flock of common starlings is flying together, the synchronised movements of the birds' wings make a distinctive whooshing sound that can be heard hundreds of metres away.

== Behaviour and ecology ==
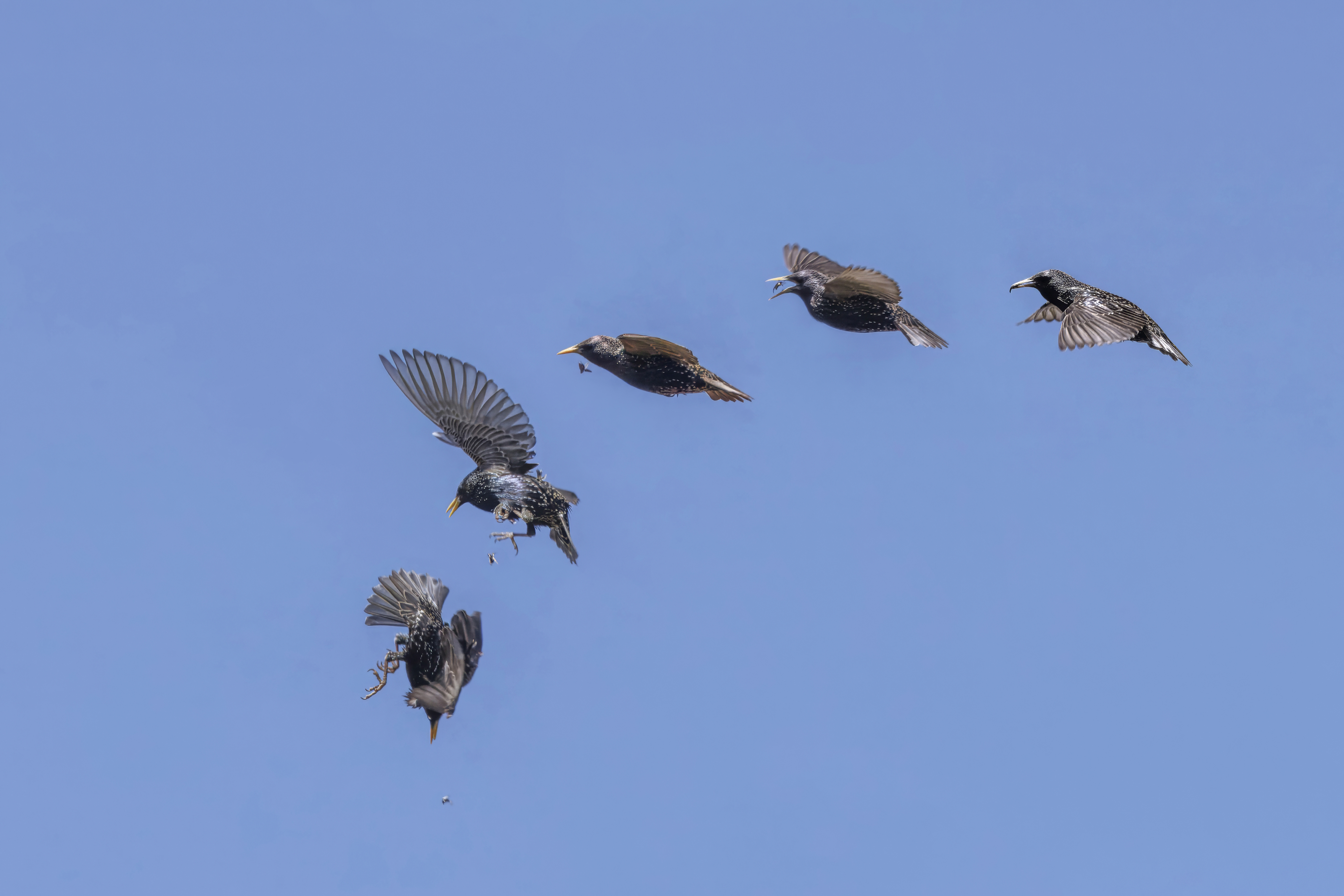
Composite of five images showing a starling dropping an insect then diving to try to recapture it

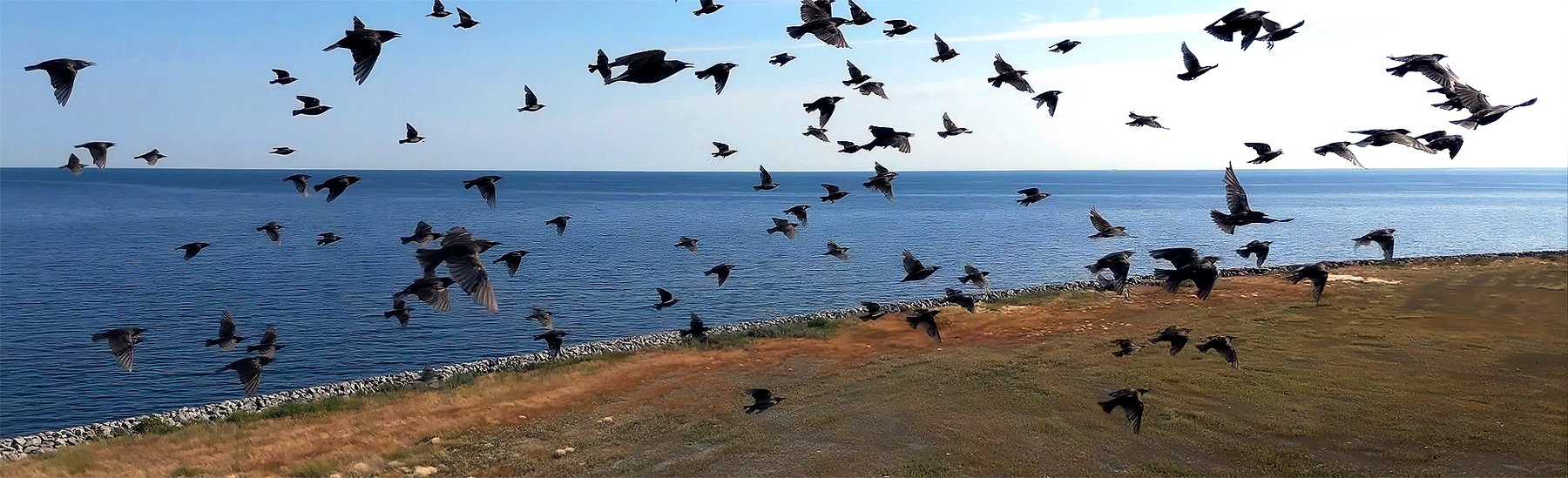
A small flock flies past.

The common starling is a highly gregarious species, especially in autumn and winter. Although flock size is highly variable, huge, noisy flocks (murmurations) may form near roosts. These dense concentrations of birds are thought to be a defence against attacks by birds of prey such as peregrine falcons or Eurasian sparrowhawks. Flocks form a tight sphere-like formation in flight, frequently expanding and contracting and changing shape, seemingly without any sort of leader. Each common starling changes its course and speed as a result of the movement of its closest neighbours.

Very large roosts, up to 1.5 million birds, form in city centres, woodlands and reedbeds, causing problems with their droppings. These may accumulate up to 30 cm (12 in) deep, killing trees by their concentration of chemicals. In smaller amounts, the droppings act as a fertiliser, and therefore woodland managers may try to move roosts from one area of a wood to another to benefit from the soil enhancement and avoid large toxic deposits.

A large flock in Rotterdam, Netherlands

Flocks of more than a million common starlings may be observed just before sunset in spring in southwestern Jutland, Denmark, over the seaward marshlands of Tønder and Esbjerg municipalities between Tønder and Ribe. They gather in March until northern Scandinavian birds leave for their breeding ranges by mid-April. Their swarm behaviour creates complex shapes silhouetted against the sky, a phenomenon known locally as sort sol ("black sun"). Flocks of anything from five to fifty thousand common starlings form in areas of the UK just before sundown during mid-winter. These flocks are commonly called murmurations.

=== Feeding ===
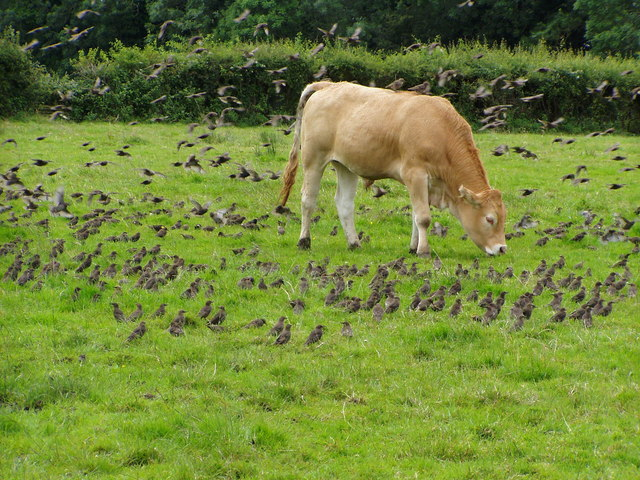
A flock foraging at a farm in Northern Ireland

The common starling is largely insectivorous and feeds on both pest and other arthropods. The food range includes spiders, crane flies, moths, mayflies, dragonflies, damsel flies, grasshoppers, earwigs, lacewings, caddisflies, flies, beetles, sawflies, bees, wasps and ants. Prey are consumed in both adult and larvae stages of development, and common starlings will also feed on earthworms, snails, small amphibians and lizards. While the consumption of invertebrates is necessary for successful breeding, common starlings are omnivorous and can also eat grains, seeds, fruits, nectar and food waste if the opportunity arises. The Sturnidae differ from most passerine birds in that they cannot easily metabolise foods containing high levels of sucrose, although they can cope with other fruits such as grapes and cherries. The isolated Azores subspecies of the common starling eats the eggs of the endangered roseate tern. Measures are being introduced to reduce common starling populations by culling before the terns return to their breeding colonies in spring.

An adult foraging and finding food for young chicks

There are several methods by which common starlings obtain their food, but, for the most part, they forage close to the ground, taking insects from the surface or just underneath. Generally, common starlings prefer foraging amongst short-cropped grasses and eat with grazing animals or perch on their backs, where they will also feed on the mammal's external parasites. Large flocks may engage in a practice known as "roller-feeding", where the birds at the back of the flock continually fly to the front where the feeding opportunities are best. The larger the flock, the nearer individuals are to one another while foraging. Flocks often feed in one place for some time, and return to previous successfully foraged sites.

There are three types of foraging behaviours observed in the common starling. "Probing" involves the bird plunging its beak into the ground randomly and repetitively until an insect has been found, and is often accompanied by bill gaping where the bird opens its beak in the soil to enlarge a hole. This behaviour, first described by Konrad Lorenz and given the German term zirkeln, is also used to create and widen holes in plastic garbage bags. It takes time for young common starlings to perfect this technique, and because of this the diet of young birds will often contain fewer insects. "Hawking" is the capture of flying insects directly from the air, and "lunging" is the less common technique of striking forward to catch a moving invertebrate on the ground. Earthworms are caught by pulling from soil. Common starlings that have periods without access to food, or have a reduction in the hours of light available for feeding, compensate by increasing their body mass by the deposition of fat.

=== Nesting ===
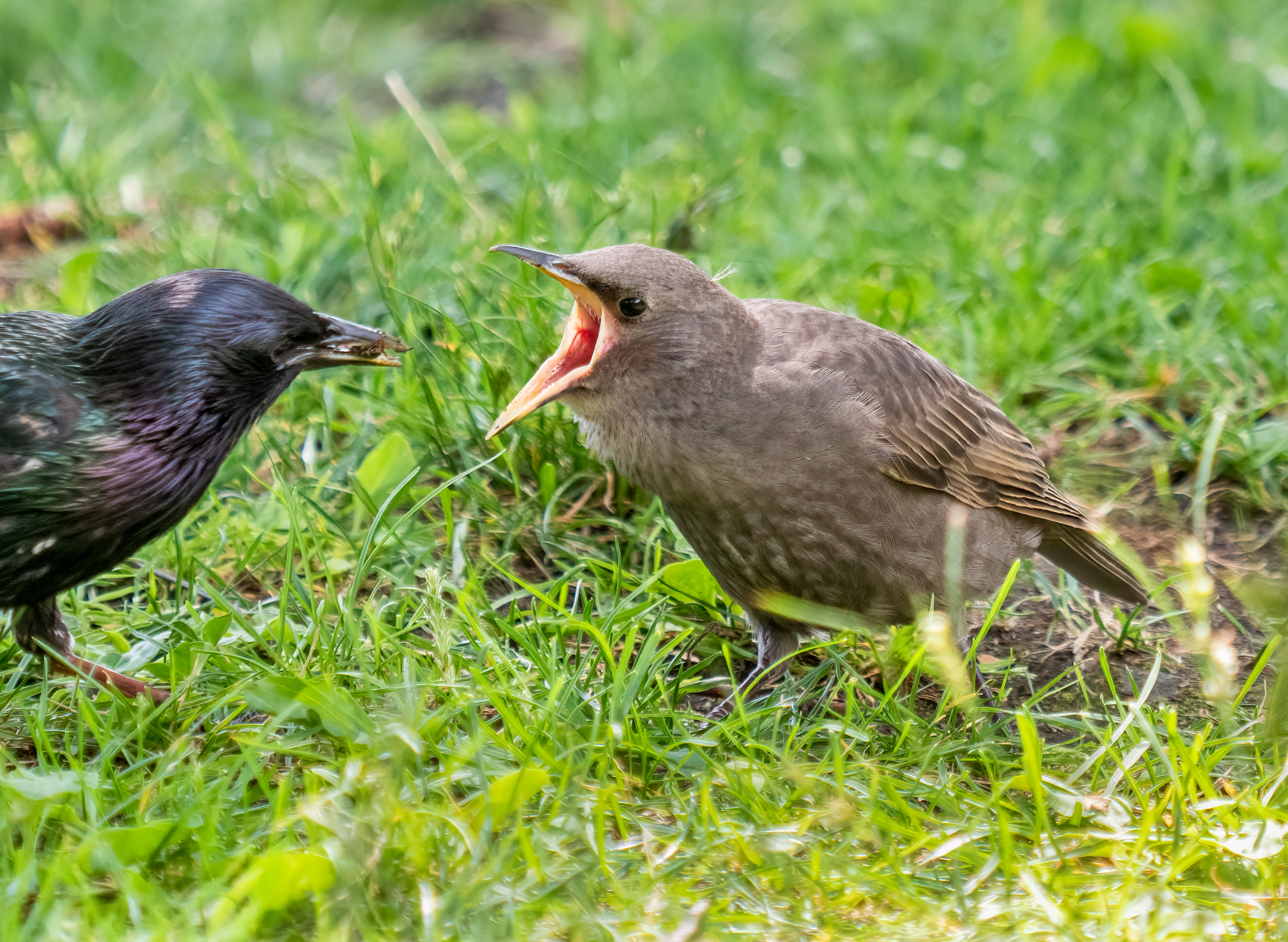
A parent feeding a chick

Unpaired males find a suitable cavity and begin to build nests in order to attract single females, often decorating the nest with ornaments such as flowers and fresh green material, which the female later disassembles upon accepting him as a mate. The amount of green material is not important, as long as some is present, but the presence of herbs in the decorative material appears to be significant in attracting a mate. The scent of plants such as yarrow acts as an olfactory attractant to females.

The males sing throughout much of the construction and even more so when a female approaches his nest. Following copulation, the male and female continue to build the nest. Nests may be in any type of hole, common locations include inside hollowed trees, buildings, tree stumps and man-made nest-boxes. S. v. zetlandicus typically breeds in crevices and holes in cliffs, a habitat only rarely used by the nominate form. Nests are typically made out of straw, dry grass and twigs with an inner lining made up of feathers, wool and soft leaves. Construction usually takes four or five days and may continue through incubation.

Common starlings are both monogamous and polygamous; although broods are generally brought up by one male and one female, occasionally the pair may have an extra helper. Pairs may be part of a colony, in which case several other nests may occupy the same or nearby trees. Males may mate with a second female while the first is still on the nest. The reproductive success of the bird is poorer in the second nest than it is in the primary nest and is better when the male remains monogamous.

=== Breeding ===
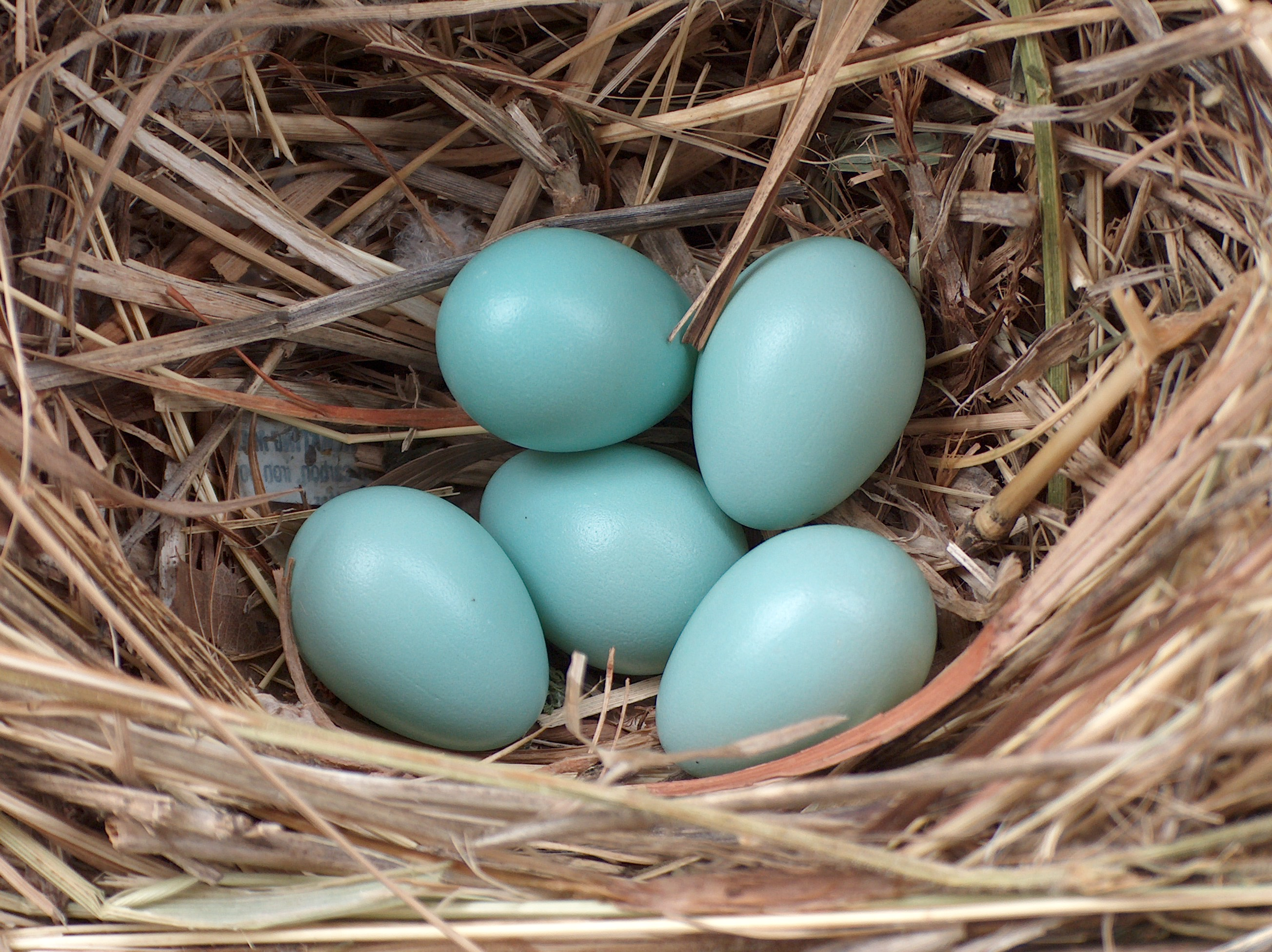
Five eggs in a nest

Breeding takes place during the spring and summer. Following copulation, the female lays eggs on a daily basis over a period of several days. If an egg is lost during this time, she will lay another to replace it. There are normally four or five eggs that are ovoid in shape and pale blue or occasionally white, and they commonly have a glossy appearance. The colour of the eggs seems to have evolved through the relatively good visibility of blue at low light levels. The egg size is 26.5–34.5 mm (1.04–1.36 in) in length and 20.0–22.5 mm (0.79–0.89 in) in maximum diameter.

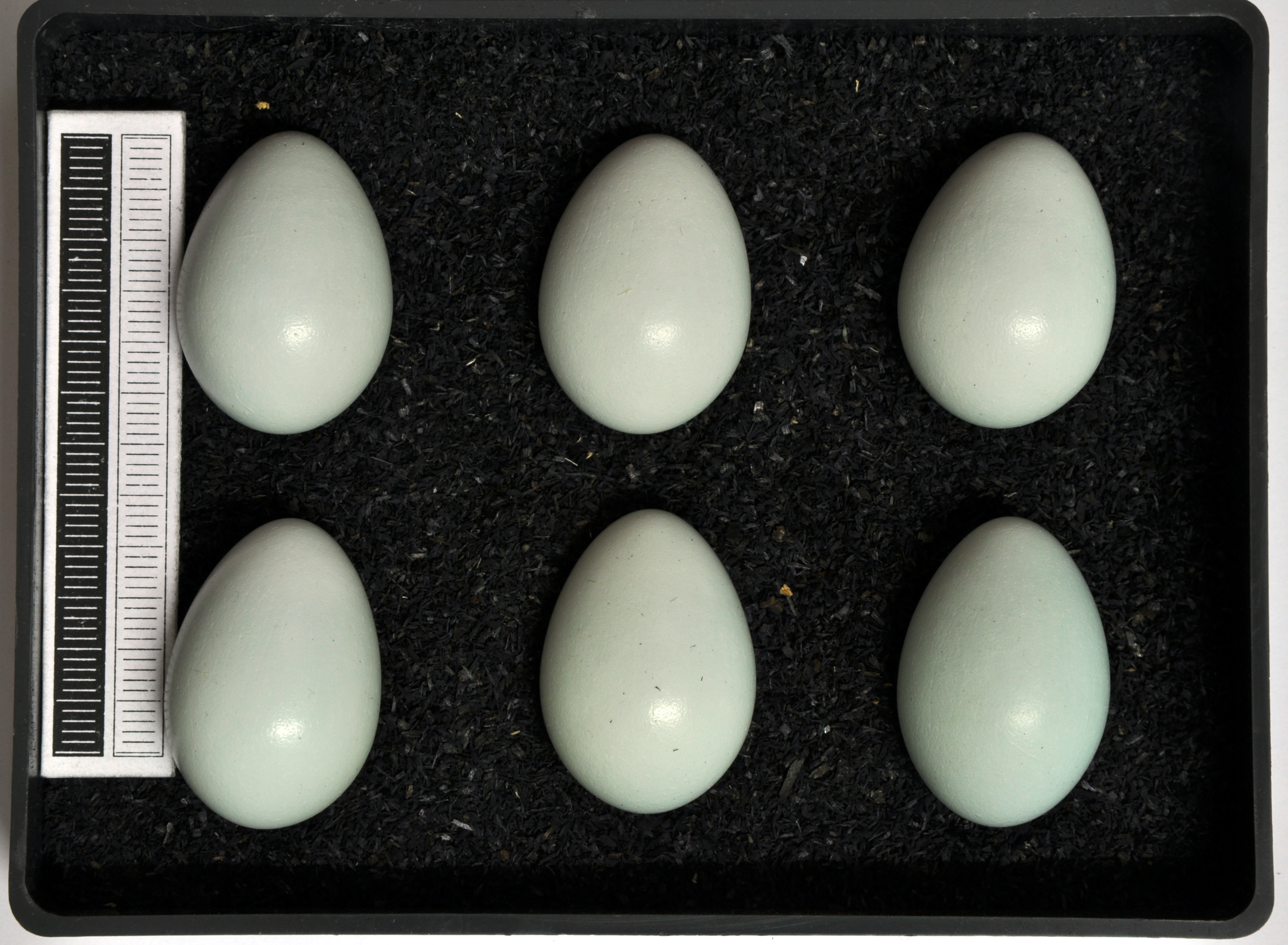
Eggs, Collection Museum Wiesbaden, Germany

Incubation lasts thirteen days, although the last egg laid may take 24 hours longer than the first to hatch. Both parents share the responsibility of brooding the eggs, but the female spends more time incubating them than does the male, and is the only parent to do so at night when the male returns to the communal roost. A pair can raise up to three broods per year, frequently reusing and relining the same nest, although two broods is typical, or just one north of 48°N. The young are born blind and naked. They develop light fluffy down within seven days of hatching and can see within nine days. As with other passerines, the nest is kept clean and the chicks' faecal sacs are removed by the adults. Once the chicks are able to regulate their body temperature, about six days after hatching, the adults largely cease removing droppings from the nest. Prior to that, the fouling would wet both the chicks' plumage and the nest material, thereby reducing their effectiveness as insulation and increasing the risk of chilling the hatchlings. Nestlings remain in the nest for three weeks, where they are fed continuously by both parents. Fledglings continue to be fed by their parents for another one or two weeks. Within two months, most juveniles will have moulted and gained their first basic plumage. They acquire their adult plumage the following year.

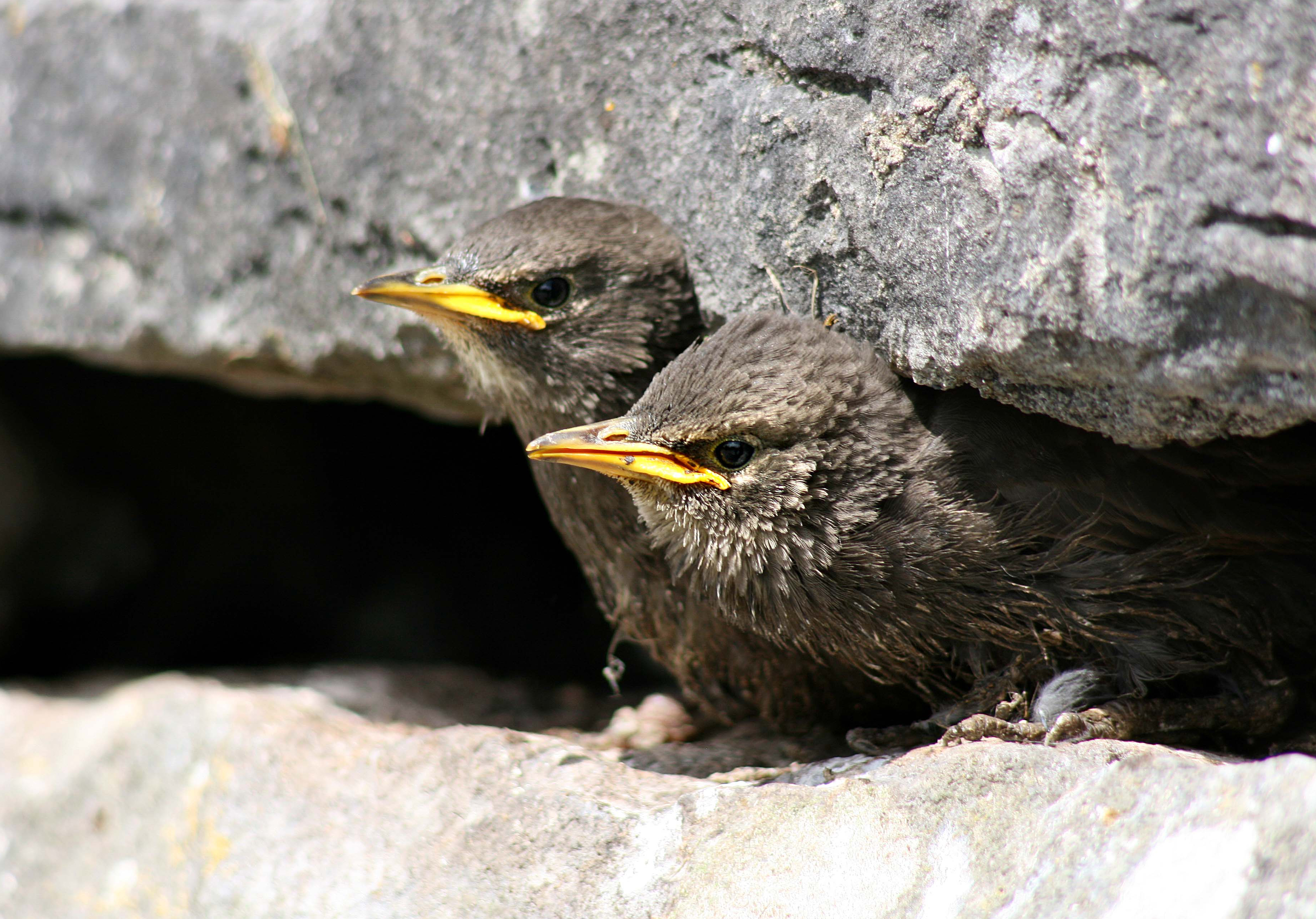
Chicks waiting to be fed at the entrance of their nest made in a gap in a wall in Galway, Ireland

Intraspecific brood parasites are common in common starling nests. Female "floaters" (unpaired females during the breeding season) present in colonies often lay eggs in another pair's nest. Fledglings have also been reported to invade their own or neighbouring nests and evict a new brood. Common starling nests have a 48% to 79% rate of successful fledging, although only 20% of nestlings survive to breeding age; the adult survival rate is closer to 60%. The average life span is about 2–3 years, with a longevity record of 22 years 11 months.

== Predators and parasites ==
A majority of starling predators are avian. The typical response of starling groups is to take flight, with a common sight being undulating flocks of starling flying high in quick and agile patterns. Their abilities in flight are seldom matched by birds of prey. Adult common starlings are hunted by hawks such as the northern goshawk (Accipiter gentilis) and Eurasian sparrowhawk (Accipiter nisus), and falcons including the peregrine falcon (Falco peregrinus), Eurasian hobby (Falco subbuteo) and common kestrel (Falco tinnunculus). Slower raptors like black and red kites (Milvus migrans & milvus), eastern imperial eagle (Aquila heliaca), common buzzard (Buteo buteo) and Australasian harrier (Circus approximans) tend to take the more easily caught fledglings or juveniles. While perched in groups by night, they can be vulnerable to owls, including the little owl (Athene noctua), long-eared owl (Asio otus), short-eared owl (Asio flammeus), barn owl (Tyto alba), tawny owl (Strix aluco) and Eurasian eagle-owl (Bubo bubo).

More than twenty species of hawk, owl and falcon are known to occasionally predate starlings in North America, though the most regular predators of adults are likely to be urban-living peregrine falcons or merlins (Falco columbarius). Common mynas (Acridotheres tristis) sometimes evict eggs, nestlings and adult common starlings from their nests, and the lesser honeyguide (Indicator minor), a brood parasite, uses the common starling as a host. Starlings are more commonly the culprits rather than victims of nest eviction however, especially towards other starlings and woodpeckers. Nests can be raided by mammals capable of climbing to them, such as small mustelids (Mustela spp.), raccoons (Procyon lotor) and squirrels (Sciurus spp.), and cats may catch the unwary.

Common starlings are hosts to a wide range of parasites. A survey of three hundred common starlings from six US states found that all had at least one type of parasite; 99% had external fleas, mites or ticks, and 95% carried internal parasites, mostly various types of worm. Blood-sucking species leave their host when it dies, but other external parasites stay on the corpse. A bird with a deformed bill was heavily infested with Mallophaga lice, presumably due to its inability to remove vermin.

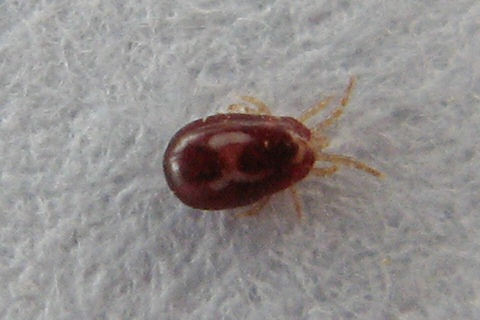
Dermanyssus gallinae, a parasite of the common starling

The hen flea (Ceratophyllus gallinae) is the most common flea in their nests. The small, pale house-sparrow flea C. fringillae, is also occasionally found there and probably arises from the habit of its main host of taking over the nests of other species. This flea does not occur in the US, even on house sparrows. Lice include Menacanthus eurystemus, Brueelia nebulosa and Stumidoecus sturni. Other arthropod parasites include Ixodes ticks and mites such as Analgopsis passerinus, Boydaia stumi, Dermanyssus gallinae, Ornithonyssus bursa, O. sylviarum, Proctophyllodes species, Pteronyssoides truncatus and Trouessartia rosteri. The hen mite D. gallinae is itself preyed upon by the predatory mite Androlaelaps casalis. The presence of this control on numbers of the parasitic species may explain why birds are prepared to reuse old nests.

Flying insects that parasitise common starlings include the louse-fly Omithomya nigricornis and the saprophagous fly Carnus hemapterus. The latter species breaks off the feathers of its host and lives on the fats produced by growing plumage. Larvae of the moth Hofmannophila pseudospretella are nest scavengers, which feed on animal material such as faeces or dead nestlings. Protozoan blood parasites of the genus Haemoproteus have been found in common starlings, but a better known pest is the brilliant scarlet nematode Syngamus trachea. This worm moves from the lungs to the trachea and may cause its host to suffocate. In Britain, the rook and the common starling are the most infested wild birds. Other recorded internal parasites include the spiny-headed worm Prosthorhynchus transverses.

Common starlings may contract avian tuberculosis, avian malaria and retrovirus-induced lymphomas. Captive starlings often accumulate excess iron in the liver, a condition that can be prevented by adding black tea-leaves to the food.

== Distribution and habitat ==
The global population of common starlings was estimated to be 310 million individuals in 2004, occupying a total area of 8,870,000 km^{2} (3,420,000 sq mi). Widespread throughout the Northern Hemisphere, the bird is native to Eurasia and is found throughout Europe, northern Africa (from Morocco to Egypt), India (mainly in the north but regularly extending farther south and extending into the Maldives) Nepal, the Middle East including Israel, Syria, Iran, and Iraq, and northwestern China.

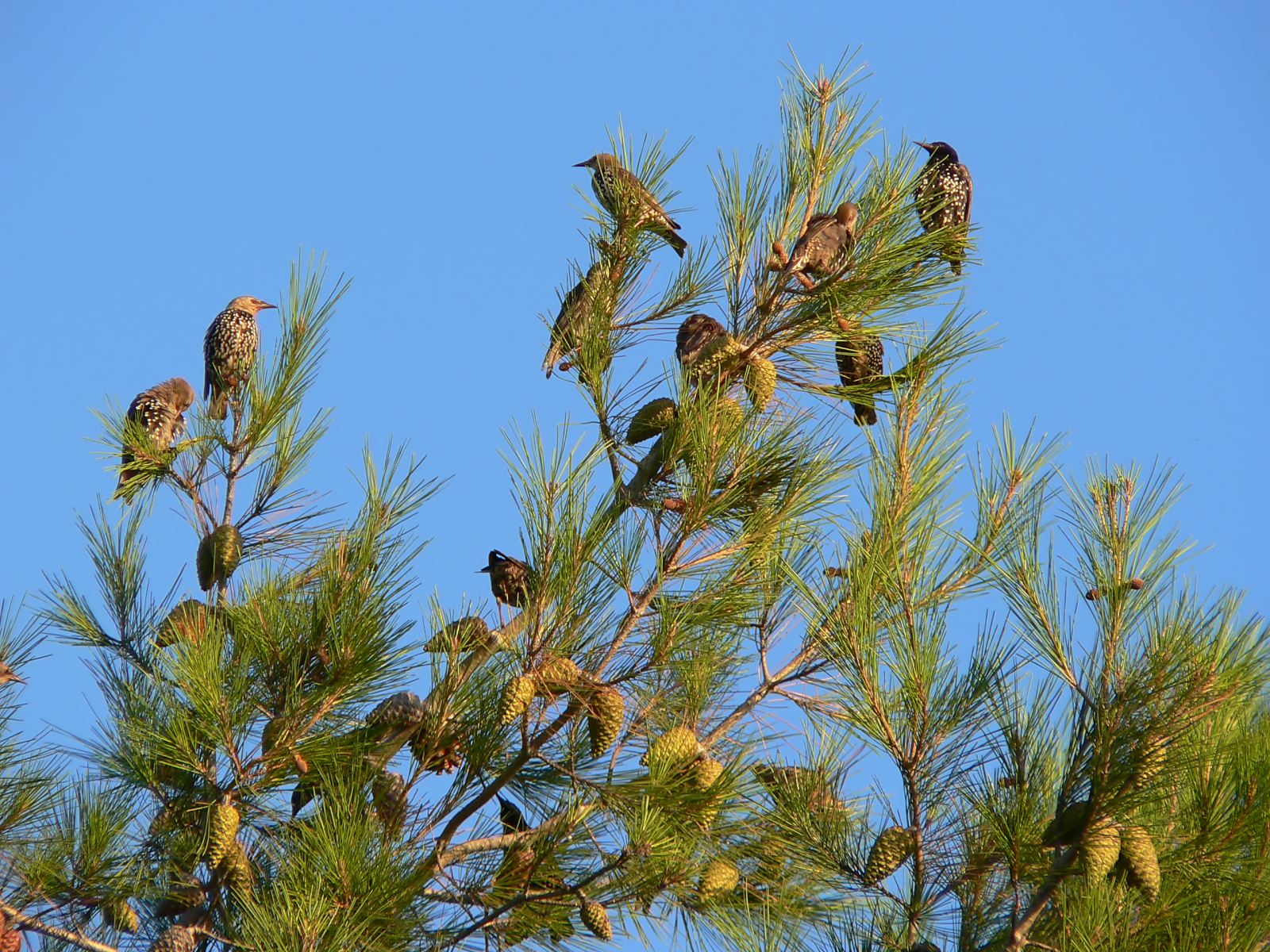
A flock resting on a pine tree during migration

Common starlings in the south and west of Europe and south of latitude 40°N are mainly resident, although other populations migrate from regions where the winter is harsh, the ground frozen and food scarce. Large numbers of birds from northern Europe, Russia and Ukraine migrate south westwards or south eastwards. In the autumn, when immigrants are arriving from eastern Europe, many of Britain's common starlings are setting off for Iberia and North Africa. Other groups of birds are in passage across the country and the pathways of these different streams of bird may cross. Of the 15,000 birds ringed as nestlings in Merseyside, England, individuals have been recovered at various times of year as far afield as Norway, Sweden, Finland, Russia, Ukraine, Poland, Germany and the Low Countries. Small numbers of common starlings have sporadically been observed in Japan and Hong Kong but it is unclear whence these birds originated. In North America, northern populations have developed a migration pattern, vacating much of Canada in winter. Birds in the east of the country move southwards, and those from farther west winter in the southwest of the US.

Common starlings prefer urban or suburban areas where artificial structures and trees provide adequate nesting and roosting sites. Reedbeds are also favoured for roosting and the birds commonly feed in grassy areas such as farmland, grazing pastures, playing fields, golf courses and airfields where short grass makes foraging easy. They occasionally inhabit open forests and woodlands and are sometimes found in shrubby areas such as Australian heathland. Common starlings rarely inhabit dense, wet forests (i.e. rainforests or wet sclerophyll forests) but are found in coastal areas, where they nest and roost on cliffs and forage amongst seaweed. Their ability to adapt to a large variety of habitats has allowed them to disperse and establish themselves in diverse locations around the world resulting in a habitat range from coastal wetlands to alpine forests, from sea cliffs to mountain ranges 1,900 m (6,200 ft) above sea level.

=== Introduced populations ===
The common starling has been introduced to and has successfully established itself in New Zealand, Australia, South Africa, North America, Fiji and several Caribbean islands. As a result, it has also been able to migrate to Thailand, Southeast Asia and New Guinea.

==== South America ====
Five individuals conveyed on a ship from England alighted near Lago de Maracaibo in Venezuela in November 1949, but subsequently vanished. In 1987, a small population of common starlings was observed nesting in gardens in the city of Buenos Aires. Since then, despite some initial attempts at eradication, the bird has been expanding its breeding range at an average rate of 7.5 km (4.7 mi) per year, keeping within 30 km (19 mi) of the Atlantic coast. In Argentina, the species makes use of a variety of natural and man-made nesting sites, particularly woodpecker holes.

==== Australia ====
The common starling was introduced to Australia to consume insect pests of farm crops. Early settlers looked forward to their arrival, believing that common starlings were also important for the pollination of flax, a major agricultural product. Nest-boxes for the newly released birds were placed on farms and near crops. The common starling was introduced to Melbourne in 1857 and Sydney two decades later. By the 1880s, established populations were present in the southeast of the country thanks to the work of acclimatisation committees. By the 1920s, common starlings were widespread throughout Victoria, Queensland and New South Wales, but by then they were considered to be pests. Although common starlings were first sighted in Albany, Western Australia in 1917, they have been largely prevented from spreading to the state. The wide and arid Nullarbor Plain provides a natural barrier and control measures have been adopted that have killed 55,000 birds over three decades. The common starling has also colonised Kangaroo Island, Lord Howe Island, Norfolk Island and Tasmania.

==== New Zealand ====
The early settlers in New Zealand cleared the bush and found their newly planted crops were invaded by hordes of caterpillars and other insects deprived of their previous food sources. Native birds were not habituated to living in close proximity to humans, so the common starling was introduced from Europe along with the house sparrow to control the pests. It was first brought over in 1862 by the Nelson Acclimatisation Society and other introductions followed. The birds soon became established and are now found all over the country including the subtropical Kermadec Islands to the north and the equally distant Macquarie Island far to the south.

==== North America ====
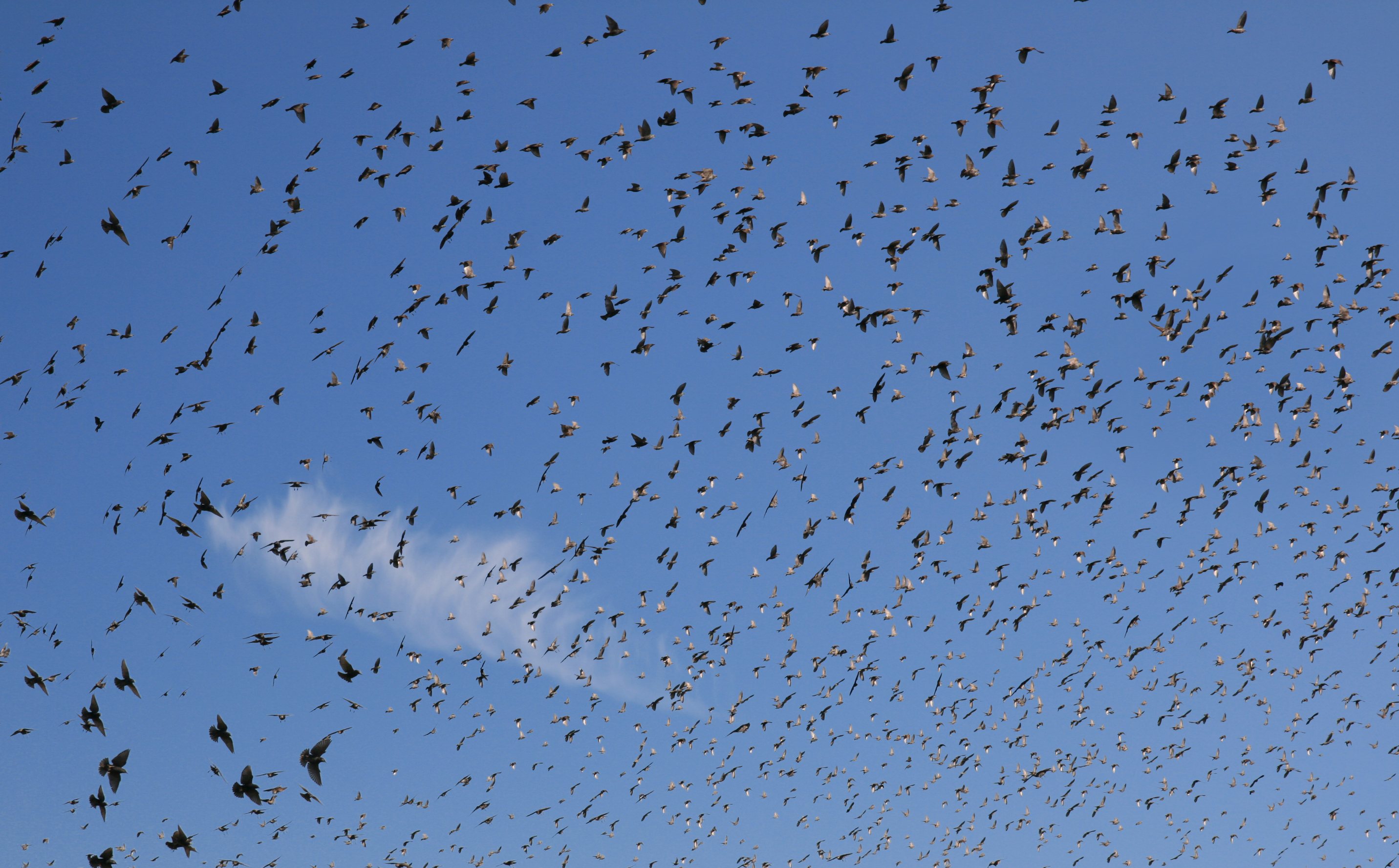
Flock in the Napa Valley, California

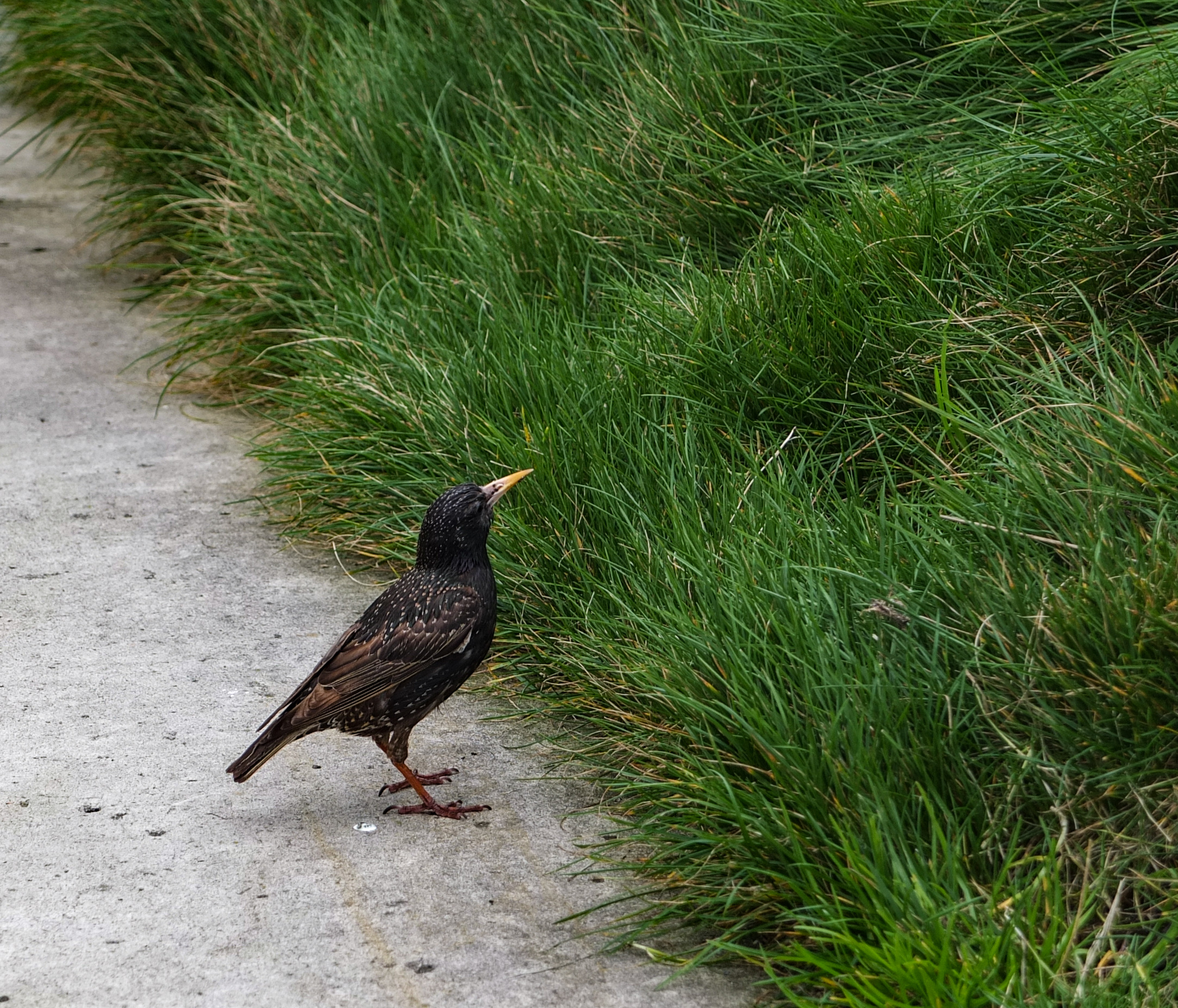
At Half Moon Bay, California

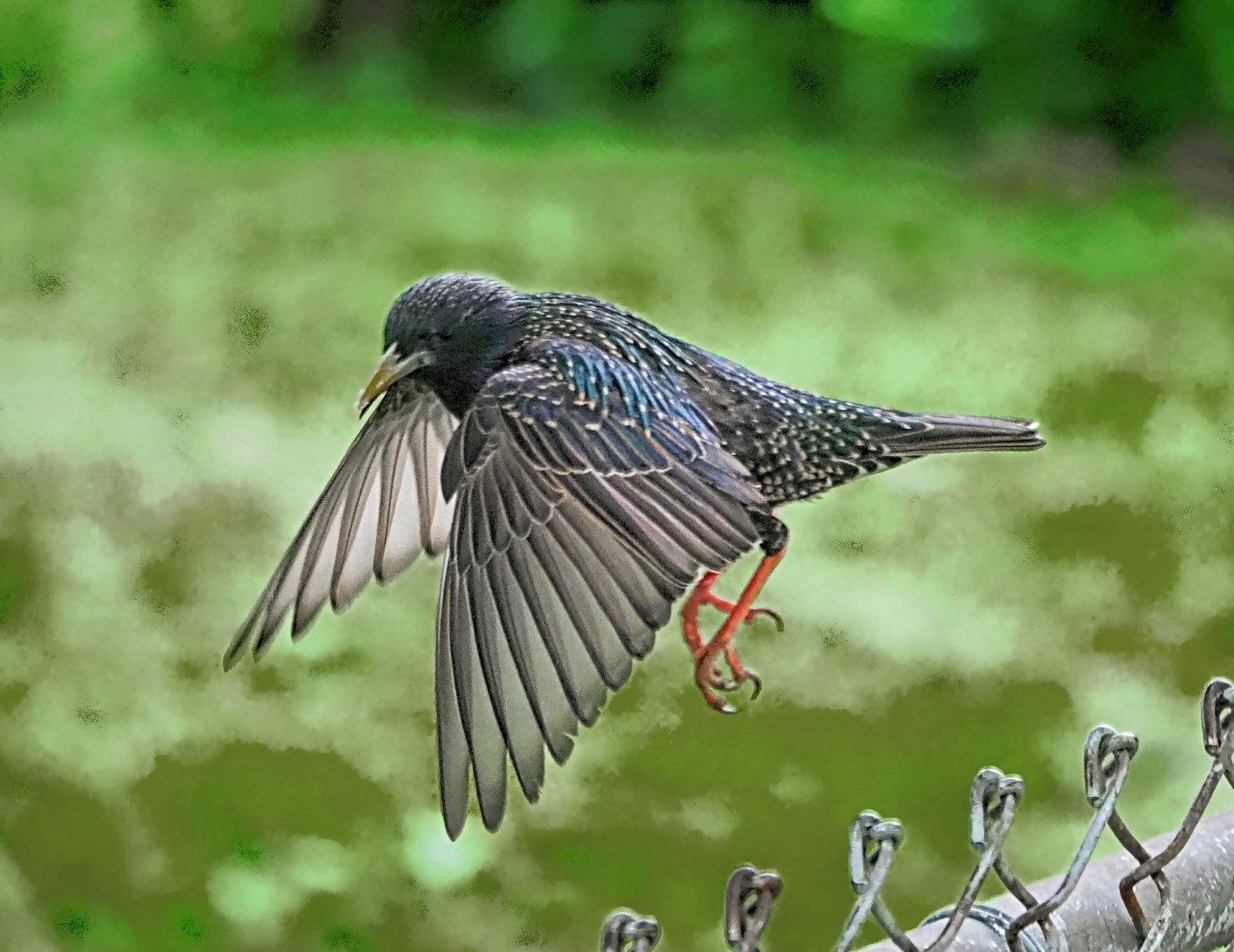
A European starling in flight, suburban St. Louis, Missouri

Various acclimatisation society records mention instances of starlings being introduced in Cincinnati, Quebec and New York in the 1870s. As part of a nationwide effort, about 60 common starlings were released in 1890 into New York's Central Park by Eugene Schieffelin, president of the American Acclimatization Society. It has been widely reported that he had tried to introduce every bird species mentioned in the works of William Shakespeare into North America, but this claim has been traced to an essay in 1948 by naturalist Edwin Way Teale, whose notes appear to indicate that it was speculation. About the same date, the Portland Song Bird Club released 35 pairs of common starlings in Portland, Oregon. Earlier introductions are recorded to have died out within a few years, with the 1890 New York and Portland introductions reported as being the most successful.

The population of the common starling in North America is estimated to have grown to 150 million, occupying an area extending from southern Canada and Alaska to Central America.

==== Polynesia ====
The common starling appears to have arrived in Fiji in 1925 on Ono-i-lau and Vatoa islands. It may have colonised from New Zealand via Raoul in the Kermadec Islands where it is abundant, that group being roughly equidistant between New Zealand and Fiji. Its spread in Fiji has been limited, and there are doubts about the population's viability. Tonga was colonised at about the same date and the birds there have been slowly spreading north through the group.

==== South Africa ====
In South Africa, the common starling was introduced in 1897 by Cecil Rhodes. It spread slowly, and by 1954, had reached Clanwilliam and Port Elizabeth. It is now common in the southern Cape region, thinning out northwards to the Johannesburg area. It is present in the Western Cape, the Eastern Cape and the Free State provinces of South Africa and lowland Lesotho, with occasional sightings in KwaZulu-Natal, Gauteng and around the town of Oranjemund in Namibia. In Southern Africa populations appear to be resident and the bird is strongly associated with man and anthropogenic habitats. It favours irrigated land and is absent from regions where the ground is baked so dry that it cannot probe for insects. It may compete with native birds for crevice nesting sites, but the indigenous species are probably more disadvantaged by destruction of their natural habitat than they are by inter-specific competition. It breeds from September to December and outside the breeding season may congregate in large flocks, often roosting in reedbeds. It is the most common bird species in urban and agricultural areas.

==== West Indies ====
In 1901, the inhabitants of Saint Kitts petitioned the Colonial Secretary for a ″government grant of starlings to exterminate″ an outbreak of grasshoppers which was causing enormous damage to their crops. The common starling was introduced to Jamaica in 1903, and the Bahamas and Cuba were colonised naturally from the US. This bird is fairly common but local in Jamaica, Grand Bahama and Bimini, and is rare in the rest of the Bahamas and eastern Cuba.

== Status ==
The global population of the common starling is estimated to be more than 310 million individuals and its numbers are not thought to be declining significantly, so the bird is classified by the International Union for Conservation of Nature as being of least concern. It had shown a marked increase in numbers throughout Europe from the 19th century to around the 1950s and 60s. In about 1830, S. v. vulgaris expanded its range in the British Isles, spreading into Ireland and areas of Scotland where it had formerly been absent, although S. v. zetlandicus was already present in Shetland and the Outer Hebrides. The common starling has bred in northern Sweden from 1850 and in Iceland from 1935. The breeding range spread through southern France to northeastern Spain, and there were other range expansions particularly in Italy, Austria and Finland. It started breeding in Iberia in 1960, while the spotless starling's range had been expanding northward since the 1950s. The low rate of advance, about 4.7 km (2.9 mi) per year for both species, is due to the suboptimal mountain and woodland terrain. Expansion has since slowed even further due to direct competition between the two similar species where they overlap in southwestern France and northwestern Spain.

Major declines in populations have been observed from 1980 onward in Sweden, Finland, northern Russia (Karelia) and the Baltic States, and smaller declines in much of the rest of northern and central Europe. The bird has been adversely affected in these areas by intensive agriculture, and in several countries it has been red-listed due to population declines of more than 50%. Numbers dwindled in the United Kingdom by more than 80% between 1966 and 2004; although populations in some areas such as Northern Ireland were stable or even increased, those in other areas, mainly England, declined even more sharply. The overall decline seems to be due to the low survival rate of young birds, which may be caused by changes in agricultural practices. The intensive farming methods used in northern Europe mean there is less pasture and meadow habitat available, and the supply of grassland invertebrates needed for the nestlings to thrive is correspondingly reduced.

== Relationship with humans ==
=== Benefits and problems ===
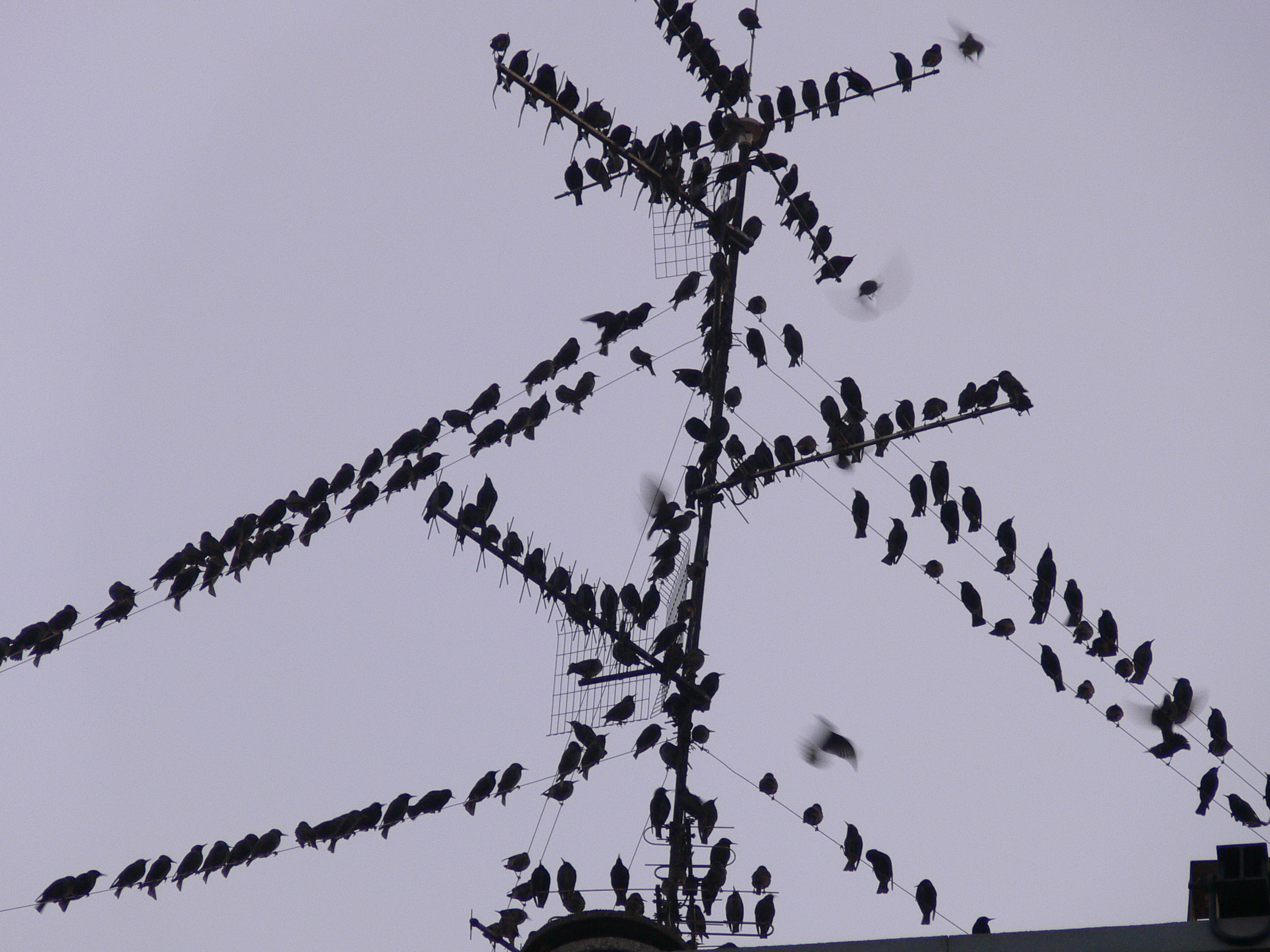
Congregating on wires in France

Since common starlings eat insect pests such as wireworms, they are considered beneficial in northern Eurasia, and this was one of the reasons given for introducing the birds elsewhere. Around 25 million nest boxes were erected for this species in the former Soviet Union, and common starlings were found to be effective in controlling the grass grub Costelytra zealandica in New Zealand. The original Australian introduction was facilitated by the provision of nest boxes to help this mainly insectivorous bird to breed successfully, and even in the US, where this is a pest species, the Department of Agriculture acknowledges that vast numbers of insects are consumed by common starlings.

Common starlings introduced to areas such as Australia or North America, where other members of the genus are absent, may affect native species through competition for nest holes. In North America, chickadees, nuthatches, woodpeckers, purple martins and other swallows may be affected. In Australia, competitors for nesting sites include the crimson and eastern rosellas. For its role in the decline of local native species and the damages to agriculture, the common starling has been included in the IUCN List of the world's 100 worst invasive species.

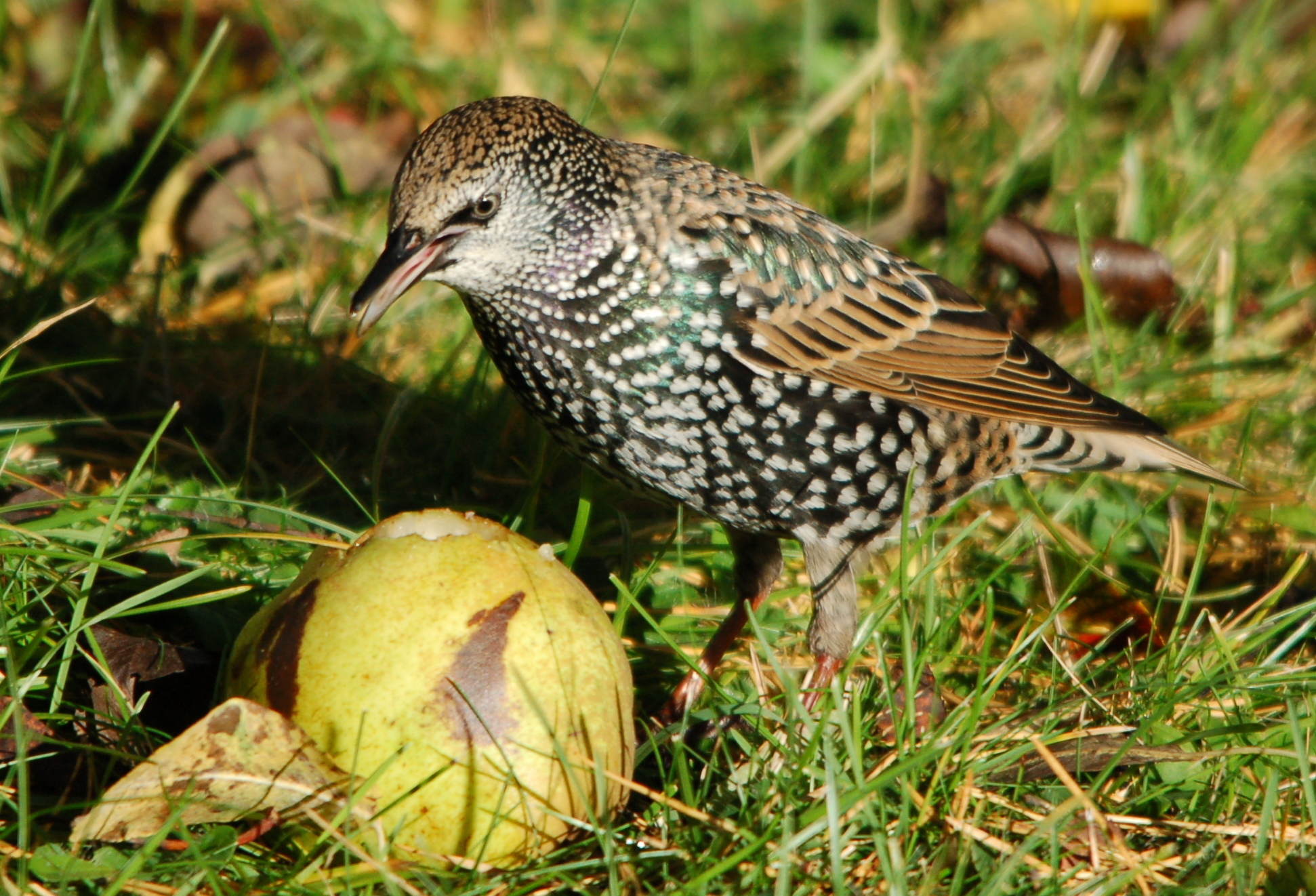
Feeding on a windfall apple

European, or common, starlings are habitat generalists meaning they are able to exploit a multitude of habitats, nest sites and food sources. This, coupled with them being lowland birds that easily coexist with humans, enables them to take advantage of other native birds, most particularly woodpecker. European starlings are considered aggressive omnivores that utilize an open-bill probing technique that gives them an evolutionary advantage over birds that are frugivores. Their aggressive and gregarious behaviour in terms of food thus allows them to outcompete native species. Common starlings are also aggressive in the creation of their nest cavities. Often, starlings will usurp a nest site, for example a tree hollow, and fill it rapidly with bedding and contaminants compared to other species, like the native parrots, that use little to no bedding. As cavity nesters, they are able to outcompete many native species in terms of habitat and nest sites.

Common starlings can eat and damage fruit in orchards such as grapes, peaches, olives, currants and tomatoes or dig up newly sown grain and sprouting crops. They may also eat animal feed and distribute seeds through their droppings. In eastern Australia, weeds like bridal creeper, blackberry and boneseed are thought to have been spread by common starlings. Agricultural damage in the US is estimated as costing about US$800 million annually. This bird is not considered to be as damaging to agriculture in South Africa as it is in the United States.

Common starlings take advantage of agricultural fields, livestock facilities, and other human related sources of food and nest sites. Starlings often assault crops such as grapes, olives, and cherries by consuming excessive amounts of crops in large flock sizes and in new grain fields, starlings pull up young plants and eat the seeds. In caged trials, it was shown that starlings eat 7–23 g (0.25–0.81 oz) of animal food daily and 20–40 g (0.71–1.41 oz) of plant food meaning a decent portion of crops are consumed by these birds. Bird damage to grapes in 1968 cost upwards to $4.4 million while losing almost 17% of the crops. Common starlings also often congregate at feeding troughs to eat grain and concurrently contaminate the food and water sources provided for livestock with their droppings. For example, high protein supplements added to cattle feed are selectively eaten by common starlings. In 1968, the cost of cattle rations consumed during winter by starlings was $84 per 1,000 starlings and is proposed to be much more expensive today given an increase in current cattle feed costs. The English or house sparrow (Passer domesticus) and the common starling are considerable agricultural pests, together causing an estimated US$1 billion per year in crop damages.

The large size of flocks can also cause problems. The large roosts of the common starling pose many safety hazards for aircraft, mainly including the clogging of engines that concurrently shutdown the plane into descent. One of the worst instances of this was the Eastern Air Lines Flight 375 incident in Boston in 1960, when 62 people died after a turboprop airliner flew into a flock and plummeted into the sea at Winthrop Harbor. From the years 1990–2001, 852 incidents of aircraft hazard due to starlings and New World blackbirds were reported with 39 strikes causing major damage that cost a total of $1,607,317.

Starlings' droppings can contain the fungus Histoplasma capsulatum, the cause of histoplasmosis in humans. At roosting sites this fungus can thrive in accumulated droppings. There are a number of other infectious diseases that can potentially be transmitted by common starlings to humans, although the potential for the birds to spread infections may have been exaggerated. The spread of disease to livestock is also a concern, possibly more important than starling's effects on food consumption or transmission of disease to humans. The spreading of Histoplasmosis reported in a Nebraska manufacturing facility saw a loss of 10,000 pigs from the spread of the disease which was valued at $1 million loss in 2014.

=== Control ===
Due to the impact of starlings on crop production, there have been attempts to control the numbers of both native and introduced populations of common starlings. Within the natural breeding range, this may be affected by legislation. For example, in Spain, the species is hunted commercially as a food item, and has a closed season, whereas in France, it is classed as a pest, and the season in which it may be killed covers the greater part of the year. In Great Britain, starlings are protected under the Wildlife and Countryside Act 1981, which makes it "illegal to intentionally kill, injure or take a starling, or to take, damage or destroy an active nest or its contents". The Wildlife Order in Northern Ireland allows, with a general licence, "an authorised person to control starlings to prevent serious damage to agriculture or preserve public health and safety". The species is migratory, so birds involved in control measures may have come from a wide area and breeding populations may not be greatly affected. In Europe, the varying legislation and mobile populations mean that control attempts may have limited long-term results. Non-lethal techniques such as scaring with visual or auditory devices have only a temporary effect in any case.

Huge urban roosts in cities can create problems due to the noise and mess made and the smell of the droppings. In 1949, so many birds landed on the clock hands of London's Big Ben that it stopped, leading to unsuccessful attempts to disrupt the roosts with netting, repellent chemical on the ledges and broadcasts of common starling alarm calls. An entire episode of The Goon Show in 1954 was a parody of the futile efforts to disrupt the large common starling roosts in central London.

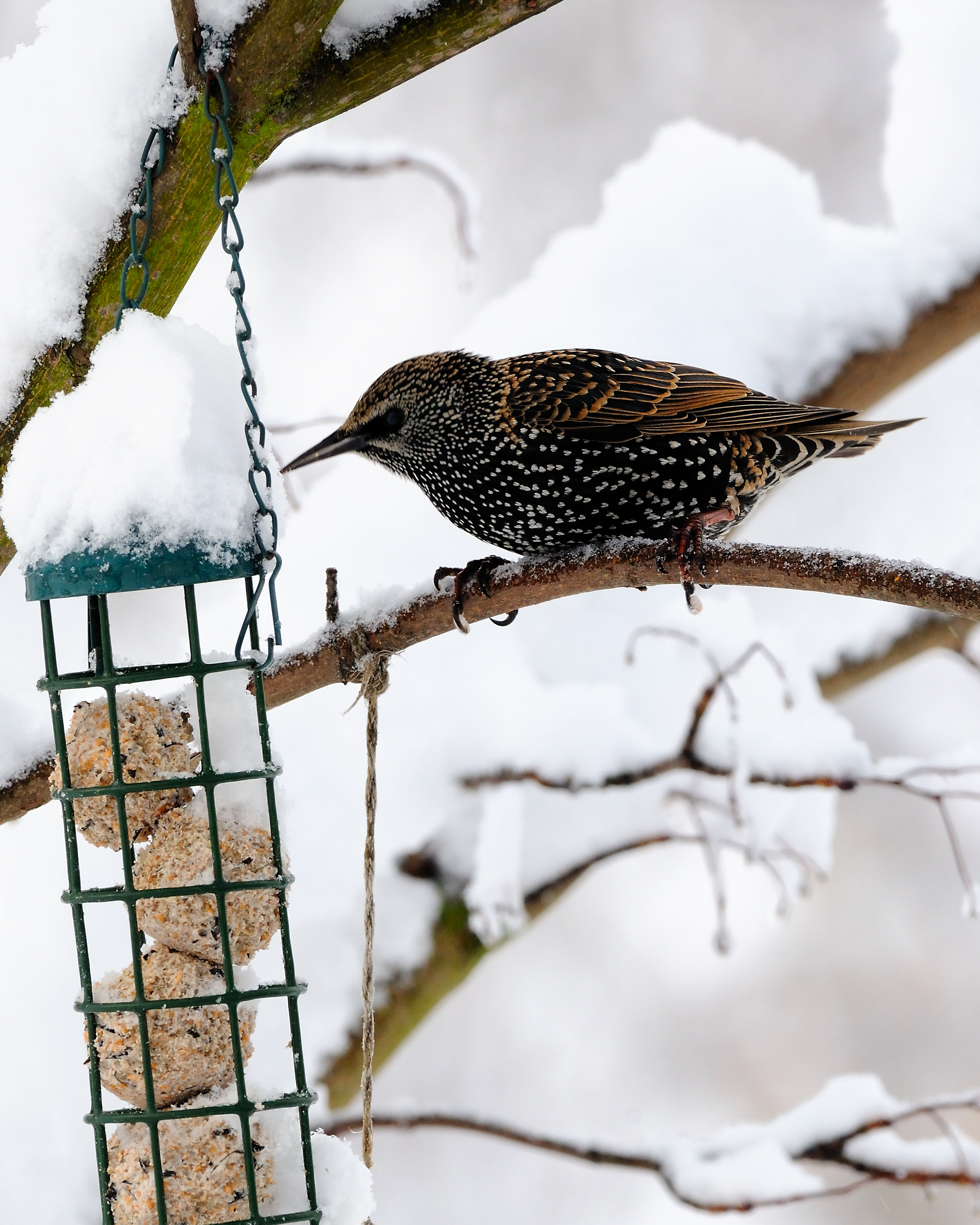
Visiting a bird feeder. The adult has a black beak in the winter.

Where it is introduced, the common starling is unprotected by legislation, and extensive control plans may be initiated. Common starlings can be prevented from using nest boxes by ensuring that the access holes are smaller than the 1.5 in (38 mm) diameter they need, and the removal of perches discourages them from visiting bird feeders.

Western Australia banned the import of common starlings in 1895. New flocks arriving from the east are routinely shot, while the less cautious juveniles are trapped and netted. New methods are being developed, such as tagging one bird and tracking it back to establish where other members of the flock roost. Another technique is to analyse the DNA of Australian common starling populations to track where the migration from eastern to western Australia is occurring so that better preventive strategies can be used. By 2009, only 300 common starlings were left in Western Australia, and the state committed a further A$400,000 in that year to continue the eradication programme.

In the United States, common starlings are exempt from the Migratory Bird Treaty Act, which prohibits the taking or killing of migratory birds. No permit is required to remove nests and eggs or kill juveniles or adults. Research was undertaken in 1966 to identify a suitable avicide that would both kill common starlings and would readily be eaten by them. It also needed to be of low toxicity to mammals and not likely to cause the death of pets that ate dead birds. The chemical that best fitted these criteria was DRC-1339, now marketed as Starlicide. In 2008, the United States government poisoned, shot or trapped 1.7 million birds, the largest number of any nuisance species to be culled. In 2005, the population in the United States was estimated at 140 million birds, around 45% of the global total of 310 million.

The likelihood of starlings to damage the feeding operations is dependent on the number of livestock, favouring areas with more livestock. They also show preference for feed types which were not whole corn but smaller feeds, creating more damage in areas where the feed was smaller. They also showed feed preference based on composition. A proposed solution to this problem is use of less palatable feed by agriculturalists, perhaps relying on larger feed types or feed which is less favourable in composition to starlings. An additional solution for mitigation control involves ensuring that livestock feeding operations are not within close proximity of each other or starling roosts. Weather conditions also had an impact on whether starlings visited livestock feeding operations, with a higher likelihood to visit in colder temperatures or following snow storms.

Alternatives to managing starling populations in agricultural areas include the use of starlicide. Use of starlicide has been found to reduce the spread of Salmonella enterica in livestock and other diseases found among livestock. Though this does not appear to eliminate introduction of these diseases completely, it has been determined that they are contributors and starling control is a successful mitigation strategy.

=== In science and culture ===
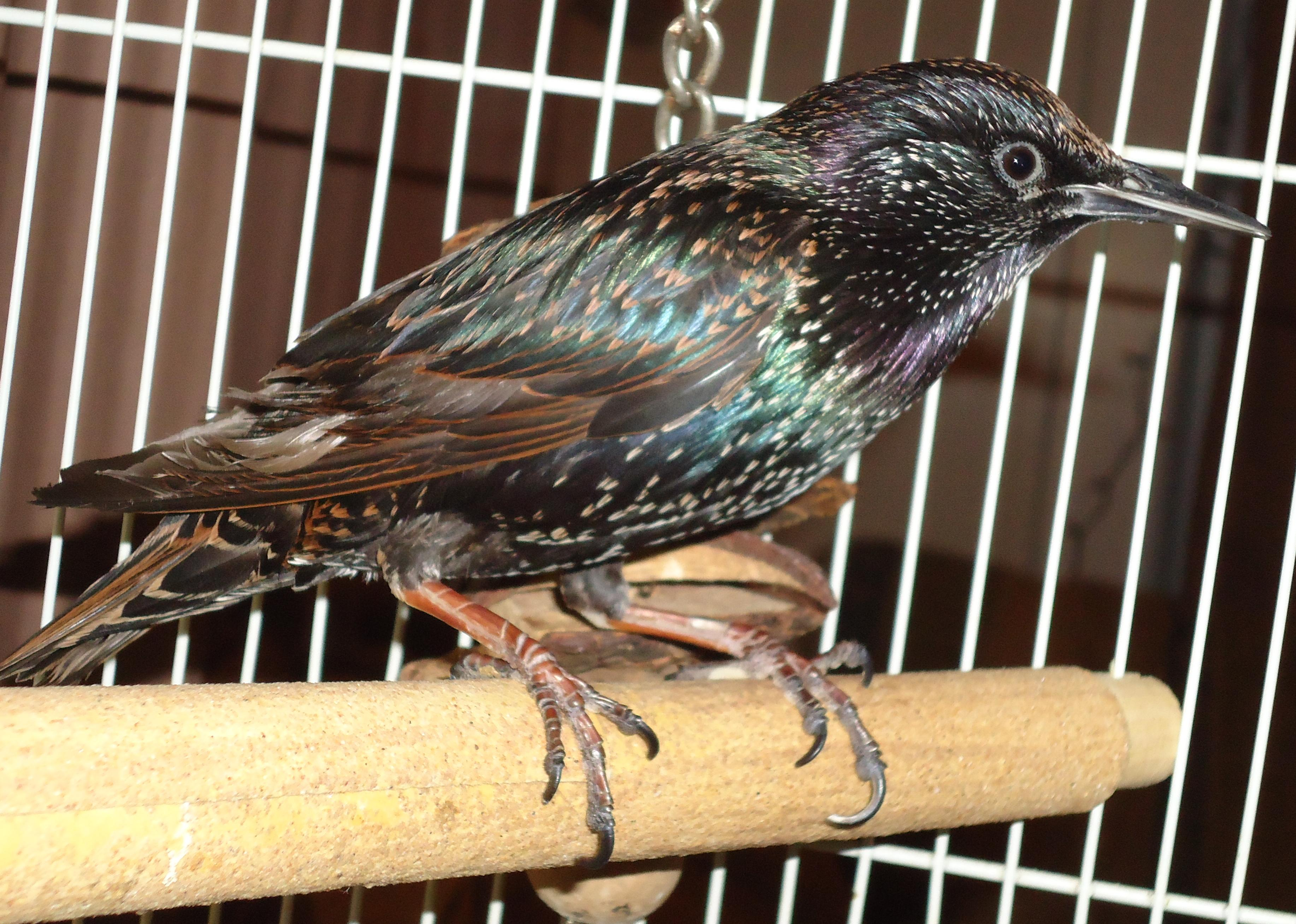
Pet in a cage

Common starlings may be kept as pets or as laboratory animals. Austrian ethologist Konrad Lorenz wrote of them in his book King Solomon's Ring as "the poor man's dog" and "something to love", because nestlings are easily obtained from the wild and after careful hand rearing they are straightforward to look after. They adapt well to captivity, and thrive on a diet of standard bird feed and mealworms. Several birds may be kept in the same cage, and their inquisitiveness makes them easy to train or study. The only disadvantages are their messy and indiscriminate defecation habits and the need to take precautions against diseases that may be transmitted to humans. As a laboratory bird, the common starling is second in numbers only to the domestic pigeon.

The common starling's gift for mimicry has long been recognised. In the medieval Welsh Mabinogion, Branwen tamed a common starling, "taught it words", and sent it across the Irish Sea with a message to her brothers, Bran and Manawydan, who then sailed from Wales to Ireland to rescue her. Pliny the Elder claimed that these birds could be taught to speak whole sentences in Latin and Greek, and in Henry IV, William Shakespeare had Hotspur declare "The king forbade my tongue to speak of Mortimer. But I will find him when he is asleep, and in his ear I'll holler 'Mortimer!' Nay I'll have a starling shall be taught to speak nothing but Mortimer, and give it to him to keep his anger still in motion."

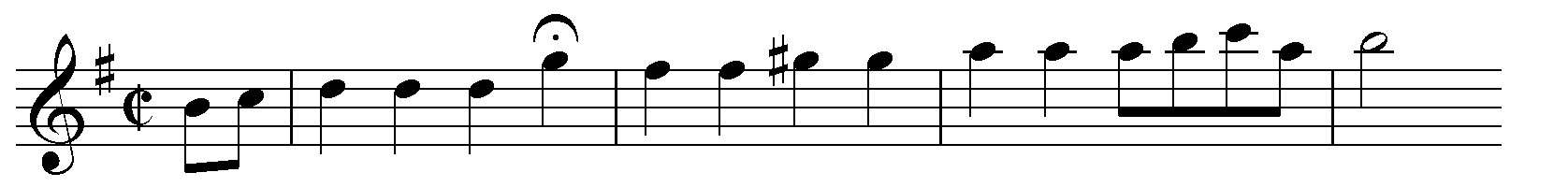
Mozart's "starling song"

Mozart had a pet common starling which could sing part of his Piano Concerto in G Major (KV. 453). He had bought it from a shop after hearing it sing a phrase from a work he wrote six weeks previously, which had not yet been performed in public. He became very attached to the bird and arranged an elaborate funeral for it when it died three years later. It has been suggested that his A Musical Joke (K. 522) might be written in the comical, inconsequential style of a starling's vocalisation. Other people who have owned common starlings report how adept they are at picking up phrases and expressions. The words have no meaning for the starling, so they often mix them up or use them on what to humans are inappropriate occasions in their songs. Their ability at mimicry is so great that strangers have looked in vain for the human they think they have just heard speak.

Common starlings are trapped for food in some Arab countries. The meat is tough and of low quality, so it is casseroled or made into pâté. One recipe said it should be stewed "until tender, however long that may be". Even when correctly prepared, it may still be seen as an acquired taste.

== Cited texts ==
- Arlott, Norman (2010). Birds of the West Indies. London: Collins. ISBN 978-0-00-727718-6.
- Artusi, Pellegrino (2003). Science in the Kitchen and the Art of Eating Well. Toronto: University of Toronto Press. ISBN 0-8020-8657-8. Translated by Murtha Baca and Stephen Sartarelli from Artusi's La scienza in cucina e l'arte di mangiare bene, first published in 1891.
- Burton, Robert (1985). Bird Behaviour. London: Granada Publishing. ISBN 0-246-12440-7.
- Cocker, Mark; Mabey, Richard (2005). Birds Britannica. London: Chatto & Windus. ISBN 0-7011-6907-9.
- Coward, Thomas Alfred (1941). The Birds of the British Isles and Their Eggs (First series) (PDF). London: Frederick Warne.
- Currie, F A; Elgy, D; Petty, S J (1977). Starling roost dispersal from woodlands. Forestry Commission Leaflet 69. Edinburgh: HMSO. ISBN 0-11-710218-0.
- Department of the Environment and Water Resources (2007). Australian Pest Animal Strategy – A national strategy for the management of vertebrate pest animals in Australia (PDF). Canberra: Department of the Environment and Water Resources. ISBN 978-0-642-55369-0. Archived from the original (PDF) on 2013-05-14.
- Feare, Chris; Craig, Adrian (1998). Starlings and Mynas. London: Christopher Helm. ISBN 0-7136-3961-X.
- Federation of Alberta Naturalists (2007). The Atlas of Breeding Birds of Alberta: A Second Look. Edmonton: Federation of Alberta Naturalists. ISBN 978-0-9696134-9-7.
- Génsbøl, Benny (1984). Birds of Prey of Europe, North Africa and Middle East. London: Collins. ISBN 0-00-219176-8.
- Gray, John Edward (1831). Zoological Miscellany. Wurtz: Treuttel.
- Higgins, P J; Peter, J M; Cowling, S J, eds. (2006). Handbook of Australian, New Zealand, and Antarctic Birds. Vol. 7: Boatbill to Starlings. Melbourne: Oxford University Press. ISBN 0-19-553996-6.
- del Hoyo, Josep; Elliott, Andrew; Christie, David, eds. (2009). Handbook of the Birds of the World. Volume 14: Bush-shrikes to Old World Sparrows. Barcelona: Lynx Edicions. ISBN 978-84-96553-50-7.
- Jobling, James A (2010). The Helm Dictionary of Scientific Bird Names (PDF). London: Christopher Helm. ISBN 978-1-4081-2501-4.
- Jones, Gwyn; Jones, Thomas (1970). The Mabinogion. London: J M Dent & Sons. ISBN 0-460-01097-2.
- Kilham, Lawrence; Waltermire, Joan (1988). On Watching Birds. College Station: Texas A&M University Press. ISBN 0-89096-763-6.
- Lever, Christopher (2010). Naturalised Birds of the World. London: A&C Black. ISBN 978-1-4081-2825-1.
- Linnaeus, Carolus (1758). Systema naturae per regna tria naturae, secundum classes, ordines, genera, species, cum characteribus, differentiis, synonymis, locis. Tomus I. Editio decima, reformata (in Latin). Holmiae. (Laurentii Salvii).
- Lockwood, William Burley, ed. (1984). The Oxford Book of British Bird Names. Oxford: Oxford University Press. ISBN 0-19-214155-4.
- Long, John A (1981). Introduced Birds of the World. Terrey Hills: A. H. & A. W. Reed. ISBN 0-589-50260-3.
- Lorenz, Konrad Z (1961). King Solomon's Ring. Wilson, Marjorie Kerr (translator). London: Methuen. ISBN 0-416-53860-6.
- Marjoniemi, Kyösti (2001). Thermogenic Mechanisms During the Development of Endothermy in Juvenile Birds (Dissertation). Acta Universitatis Ouluensis, 373. Oulu, Finland: Department of Biology, University of Oulu. ISBN 951-42-6542-4. ISSN 1796-220X. OCLC 851411534. Archived (PDF) from the original on 16 April 2003.
- Michalowski, Kevin (2011). Gun Digest Book of Sporting Shotguns. Iola: Gun Digest Books. ISBN 978-1-4402-2669-4.
- Neves, Verónica (2005). Towards a Conservation Strategy of the Roseate Tern Sterna dougallii in the Azores Archipelago (PDF). Glasgow: University of Glasgow.
- Parkes, John; Weller, Wendy; Reddiex, Ben (2005). Proceedings of the 13th Australasian Vertebrate Pest Conference (PDF). Wellington, New Zealand: The Museum of New Zealand (Te Papa). Archived from the original (PDF) on 2013-05-15.
- Parkin, David; Knox, Alan (2009). The Status of Birds in Britain and Ireland. London: Christopher Helm. ISBN 978-1-4081-2500-7.
- Raffaele, Herbert; Wiley, James; Garrido, Orlando; Keith, Allan; Raffaele, Janis (2003). Birds of the West Indies. London: Christopher Helm. ISBN 978-0-7136-5419-6.
- Rasmussen, Pamela C; Anderton, John C (2005). Birds of South Asia. The Ripley Guide. Volume 2. Washington DC and Barcelona: Smithsonian Institution and Lynx Edicions. ISBN 84-87334-66-0.
- Robertson, Hugh; Heather, Barrie (2005). Hand Guide to the Birds of New Zealand. Auckland: Oxford University Press. ISBN 0-14-028835-X.
- Rothschild, Miriam; Clay, Theresa (1957). Fleas, Flukes and Cuckoos. A study of bird parasites. New York: Macmillan.
- Sibley, David (2000). The North American Bird Guide. Robertsbridge: Pica Press. ISBN 1-873403-98-4.
- Snow, David; Perrins, Christopher M, eds. (1998). The Birds of the Western Palearctic concise edition. Oxford: Oxford University Press. ISBN 978-0-19-854099-1. (Two volumes.)
- Sparagano, Olivier A E, ed. (2009). Control of Poultry Mites (Dermanyssus). Dordrecht: Springer. doi:10.1007/978-90-481-2731-3. ISBN 978-90-481-2730-6.
- Taylor, Marianne; Holden, Peter (2009). RSPB Where to Discover Nature: In Britain and Northern Ireland. London: Christopher Helm. ISBN 978-1-4081-0864-2.
- Watling, Dick (2003). A Guide to the Birds of Fiji and Western Polynesia. Suva: Environmental Consultants. ISBN 982-9030-04-0.
- Yeats, William Butler (2000). The Collected Poems of W. B. Yeats. Ware: Wordsworth Editions. ISBN 1-85326-454-7.
