= Muscle protractor pterygoidei et quadrati =

Cranial muscle in birds

The M. protractor pterygoidei et quadrati is a cranial muscle that pulls the streptostylic quadrate dorsorostrally in birds.
