= Charles Pomerantz =

American entomologist

Charles Pomerantz (c. 1896 – June 1, 1973) was a pest control expert and self-trained entomologist who played a pivotal role in identifying the etiology of a 1946 outbreak in New York City of what was later named rickettsialpox. In subsequent years, he spoke before audiences at colleges and other public forums about the menace from pests.

Pomerantz was born in Poland and came to the United States as a child. He grew up on Manhattan's Lower East Side, where he attended P.S. 20. He had originally started in a business manufacturing ladies coats, but switched to pest control as a means of performing a greater service to the community.

After visiting an apartment complex in Queens where a series of people had become sick with unusual rashes, Pomerantz inspected the site and discovered the mites near the building's incinerator rooms and reported his findings to health officials. Visiting the stricken Kew Gardens, Queens complex with physician Robert Huebner, the two peeled back wallpaper to find the walls swarming with mites, so much so that tenants had described that "the walls had movement". Huebner's investigations on the site led to the conclusion that tenants had been bitten by a mite identified as Allodermanyssus sanguineus, found on mice that infested the storerooms and incinerator areas in the buildings. Pomerantz was credited with identifying this as a zoonotic disease spread through mice and the mites that infested them. After culturing and isolating the organism in laboratory mice, the pathogen they named Rickettsia akari was identified as the ultimate cause of the disease now called rickettsialpox. The Department of Health announced a program to work with building owners to exterminate the mice that were the vector for the disease. Over 500 cases of the disease were diagnosed in New York City from 1947 to 1951.

Pomerantz spoke about the importance of rodent control in densely populated areas in a March 1949 lecture to students and faculty members of the Harvard School of Public Health. Pomerantz noted that many mite-born illnesses may be misidentified as chickenpox, hives or scabies, and that physicians and entomologists needed to be prepared for the symptoms of these illnesses spread by mites.

In 1949, Dr. Edward W. Baker of the United States Bureau of Entomology and Plant Quarantine honored Pomerantz with the naming of a mite discovered in peach orchards in the Southern United States, calling it Pomerantzia charlesi in recognition of Pomerantz's work. A species of flea discovered in the Philippines was named for him in 1951 as Stivalius pomerantzi. Over the course of his career, he was also honored by having his name given to a crane fly and a group of prostigmatic mites.

A resident of Hallandale Beach, Florida, Pomerantz died there at age 76 on June 1, 1973. He was survived by his wife, a daughter and a grandchild.
