= Janet Hartley =

Janet Hartley may refer to:

- Janet M. Hartley, professor of international history
- Janet W. Hartley, American virologist
