= Robert Huebner =

American physician (1914-1998)

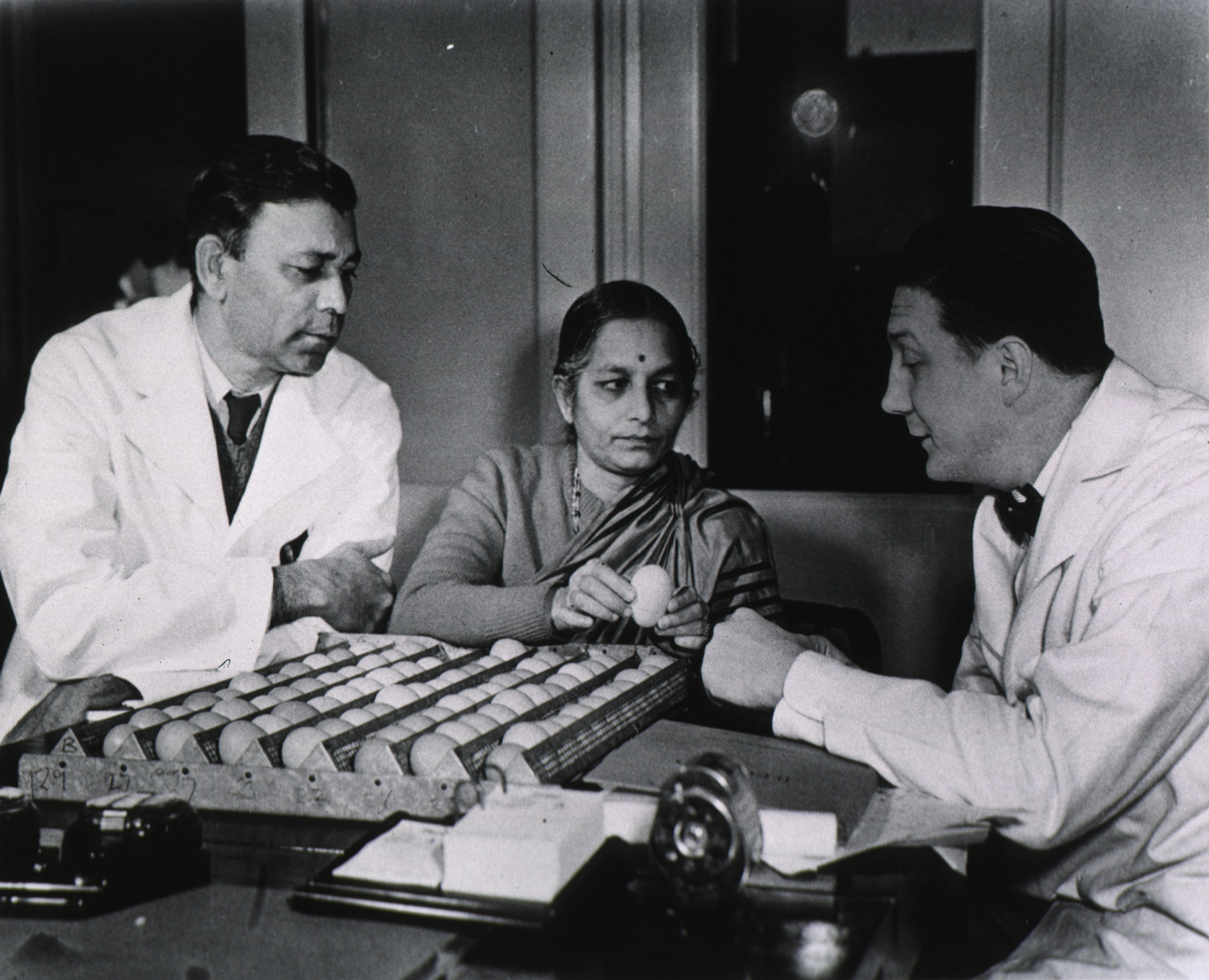
Robert Huebner (right) and others examine eggs

Robert Joseph Huebner (February 23, 1914 – August 26, 1998), was an American physician and virologist whose research into viruses, their causes and treatment that led to his breakthrough insights into the connections between viruses and cancer, leading to new treatments, as well as his hypothesized oncogene, which was discovered to be a trigger for normal cells turning cancerous.

== Early life and education ==
Huebner was born in Cheviot, Ohio, a western suburb of Cincinnati, on February 23, 1914. After attending a local parish elementary school, he attended Elder High School, graduating in 1932. He attended Xavier College (later Xavier University, where he majored in economics and English literature and took the prerequisites to attend law school. He decided he wanted to become a physician and did his premed undergraduate training at the University of Cincinnati. He attended the Saint Louis University School of Medicine starting in 1938. He was threatened with expulsion from the school after officials there discovered that he had taken outside work to pay for his education in violation of school policy — including a job as a bouncer at a brothel — but stayed in school and graduated in 1942. He graduated in June 1942, ranked in the top five of his class of 100.

After graduating, he joined the United States Public Health Service during World War II, and was assigned for a year to the United States Marine Hospital in Seattle, and then to the United States Coast Guard ship USS Hemlock in Alaska. The Public Health Service transferred him to a position as a researcher at the National Institutes of Health in July 1944.

== Rickettsialpox ==
In June and July 1945, Huebner was asked to investigate an outbreak of cases of a spotted fever that struck more than 100 New York City residents, most of whom were residents of a single apartment complex in Kew Gardens, Queens. Local physicians hadn't initially reported the cases to authorities, as most presented with a rash and fever, but recovered within two weeks without any specific treatment. The New York City Department of Health was informed after a "minor epidemic" broke out at the Queens housing complex and individuals had been sent to hospitals with violent fevers and skin lesions. The seven known rickettsial diseases were all ruled out based on tests.

Visiting the complex with self-trained entomologist Charles Pomerantz, the two peeled back wallpaper to find the walls swarming with mites, so much so that tenants had described that "the walls had movement". Huebner's investigations on the site led to the conclusion that tenants had been bitten by a mite identified as Allodermanyssus sanguineus, found on mice that infested the storerooms and incinerator areas in the buildings. After culturing and isolating the organism in laboratory mice, the pathogen they named Rickettsia akari was identified as the ultimate cause of the disease now called rickettsialpox. The Department of Health announced a program to work with building owners to exterminate the mice that were the vector for the disease.

Huebner document his findings of the new disease in a 1947 paper published in the Journal of the American Medical Association. He was recognized by the American Society of Tropical Medicine for his efforts with the Bailey K. Ashford Award in 1949, which included a $1,000 prize from Eli Lilly and Company that he later used as a down payment for a farm in Frederick, Maryland.

== Q Fever ==
Huebner's first work on Q Fever was a report he had done on an outbreak of 18 cases that occurred in early 1946 in an NIH laboratory, where he showed a correlation between a spike in cases and the preparation of antigens in yolk sacs, and he prepared another report on a group of 47 patients being treated for the condition at the Public Health Service Hospital in Baltimore. He was sent in spring 1947 to investigate an outbreak at milk farms in the Los Angeles area, in which there was a dense population of farms in which the animals had little space, creating what Huebner called "unpasturized cows". Huebner found the cause to be a member of the rickettsia family that was found in containers of unpasteurized milk. The cause was found to be Coxiella burnetii, with their findings published in 1948 in the American Journal of Public Health. Dairy farmers were upset by the insinuation that they were responsible for the outbreak and put pressure on local health officials to ask Huebner to leave the area.

Huebner found that the C. burnetii bacteria could survive temperatures of up to 60 °C (140 °F) in sealed containers for as long as 30 minutes, just below the levels used for vat pasteurization. This could mean that there was no way to verify that every particle within a vat was raised to the peak temperature and that pasteurization might not eliminate all of the bacteria in the milk being treated.

== Adenovirus and oncogenes ==
While trying to grow common cold viruses, he and his colleague Dr. Wallace Rowe first tried to use adenoid and tonsil tissue, before using a culture based on tumor cells. From that culture they isolated cytomegalovirus, as well as the first of a large family of adenoviruses. Dr. Robert M. Chanock said the discovery "put him up there with Sabin" (creator of the oral polio vaccine) as one of the "great moments in virology". Based on their observations, Huebner and Rowe hypothesized that these viruses could trigger an unknown gene that would cause cells to grow out of control.

In a paper published in the Proceedings of the National Academy of Sciences in 1969, Huebner advanced his theory that oncogenes, then only a hypothetical construct, could cause normal cells to mutate and become cancerous. A specific gene matching the theorized description was discovered and led to the development of treatments for cancer and other diseases.

In contrast to medical wisdom in the 1960s and 1970s, Huebner was confident that viruses were a cause of cancer in humans and convinced the United States Department of Health, Education and Welfare to provide $60 million in grants to fund research on the connection as part of the war on cancer. This led to the discovery of the role that cytomegalovirus plays in opportunistic infections in patients with immunodeficiency. Research on retroviruses led to the development of a vaccine for hepatitis B, which has led to major decreases in rates of liver cancer, rates of some viral cancers, like that of the liver, have been sharply reduced.

He took a position in 1968 as chief of the National Cancer Institute's Laboratory of Viral Carcinogenesis, staying there until his retirement in 1982.

== Awards and recognition ==
President of the United States Richard Nixon presented Huebner with the National Medal of Science at a White House dinner held on February 16, 1970, recognizing his "contributions to the modern understanding of the biology of viruses and their role in the induction of diverse diseases."

He was also inducted into and participated actively in the United States National Academy of Sciences. He also received the Rockefeller Public Service Award.

== Personal life ==
He bought a 300-acre (1.2 km^{2}) farm for $4,000 in Frederick, Maryland where he raised his family, using the money he had received as part of an award for his rickettsial research to make the necessary downpayment. His children were each given the task of raising an American Angus bull to help pay for their college education. By the time of Huebner's death in 1998, the farm was operated by three of his children.

Huebner died at age 84 due to pneumonia on August 26, 1998, at the Veterans Administration Medical Center in Coatesville, Pennsylvania, where he had been a resident since 1991. He had been diagnosed with Alzheimer's disease in the early 1980s. He was survived by his second wife, Harriet, as well as by six daughters, two sons and 11 grandchildren. His first marriage had ended in divorce.
