= Feather pillow dermatitis =

Rash caused by mite bites

- Specialty: Dermatology

Feather pillow dermatitis is a rash caused by bites of the mite Dermatophagoides scheremetewskyi.

== See also ==
- List of cutaneous conditions
- List of mites associated with cutaneous reactions
