= Rickettsia akari =

Scientific classification
- Domain: Bacteria
- Kingdom: Pseudomonadati
- Phylum: Pseudomonadota
- Class: Alphaproteobacteria
- Subclass: "Rickettsidae"
- Order: Rickettsiales
- Family: Rickettsiaceae
- Genus: Rickettsia
- Species group: Spotted fever group
- Species: R. akari

Binomial name
- Rickettsia akari Huebner, 1946

Species of bacterium

Rickettsia akari is a species of Rickettsia which causes rickettsialpox.

After a 1946 outbreak of a rickettsial-type disease at an apartment complex in Kew Gardens, Queens, an investigation was performed to identify the source of the infections. The incinerators in the buildings were not operated on a daily basis, leading to a buildup in food waste and attracting mice that were rampant throughout the building. The Mus musculus mice were found to be carrying mites, identified as the house mouse mite, Allodermanyssus sanguineus. Self-trained entomologist Charles Pomerantz asked permission to search the site and found the mites at various sites throughout the building, with blood-engorged mites found near chutes leading to the incinerator. The mites were collected and brought to a laboratory of the United States Public Health Service, which found in the mites an organism that had also been isolated from the mice, and from the blood of individuals infected with the disease.

The organism was given its name by physician Robert Huebner, one of the scientists who had tracked down the source of the original 1946 epidemic; the akari portion of the bacteria's name represents the Greek word for "mite".

While active efforts to exterminate mice from buildings has greatly reduced recurrences of the diseases, a July 2002 report from the Centers for Disease Control and Prevention report a recent case in North Carolina, noting that cases have been reported in Croatia and Ukraine and that the R. akari organism may exist in "sylvan cycles", such as its isolation from voles in Korea.

== See also ==
- Liponyssoides sanguineus
