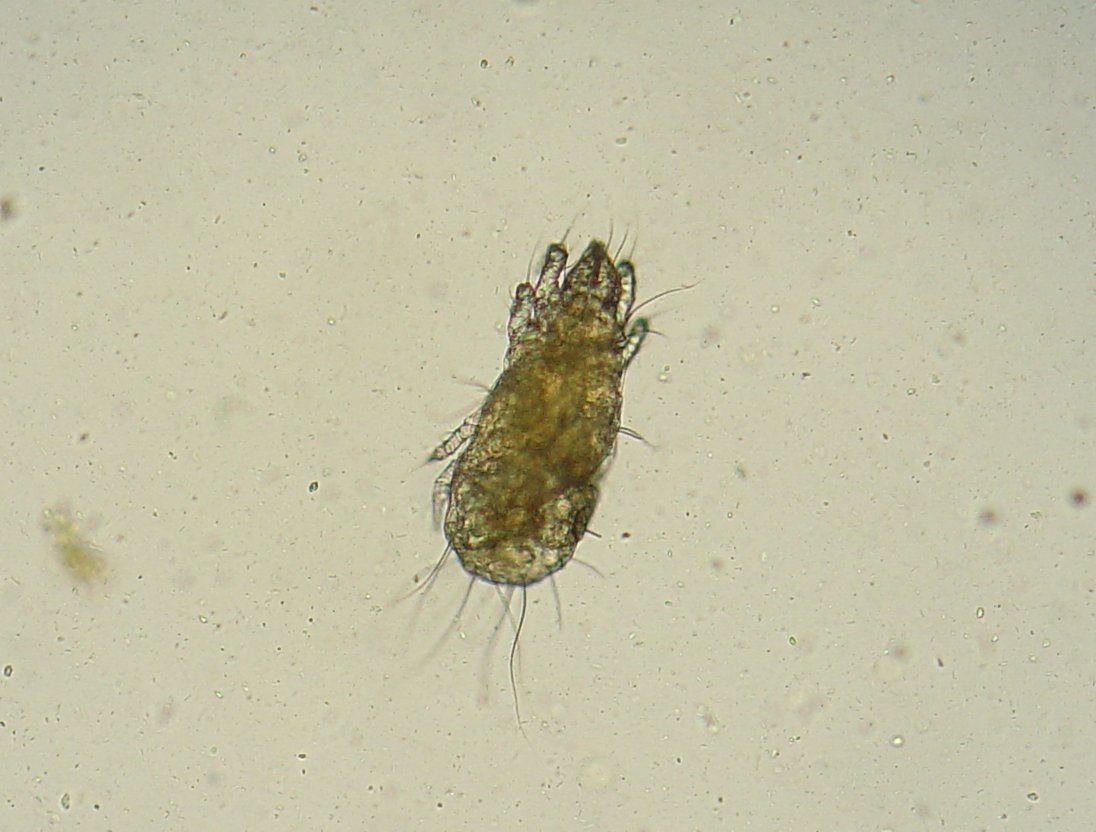

Scientific classification
- Kingdom: Animalia
- Phylum: Arthropoda
- Subphylum: Chelicerata
- Class: Arachnida
- Order: Sarcoptiformes
- Family: Acaridae
- Genus: Acarus
- Species: A. siro

Binomial name
- Acarus siro Linnaeus, 1758

= Flour mite =

Species of mite

The flour mite, Acarus siro, a pest of stored grains and animal feedstuffs, is one of many species of grain and flour mites. An older name for the species is Tyroglyphus farinae.

The flour mite, which is pale greyish white in colour with pink legs, is the most common species of mite in foodstuffs. The males are from 0.33–0.43 millimetres (0.013–0.017 in) long and the female is from 0.36–0.66 mm (0.014–0.026 in) long. The flour mites are found in grain and may become exceedingly abundant in poorly stored material. The female produces large clutches of eggs and the life cycle takes just over two weeks. The cast skins and dead bodies can form a fluffy brown material that accumulates under sacks on the warehouse floor.

Flour mites that contaminate grains, flour and animal feedstuffs, create allergens in the dust produced, and also transfer pathogenic microorganisms. Foodstuffs acquire a sickly sweet smell and an unpalatable taste. When fed infested feeds, animals show reduced feed intake, diarrhea, inflammation of the small intestine, and impaired growth. Pigs have their live-weight gain, feed-to-gain ratio, and nitrogen retention markedly reduced by infested feeds.

Flour mites are intentionally inoculated into Mimolette cheese to improve the flavor. When used for this purpose, they may be referred to as "cheese mites".

The mites sometimes bite humans, which can cause an allergic reaction known as Baker's itch.

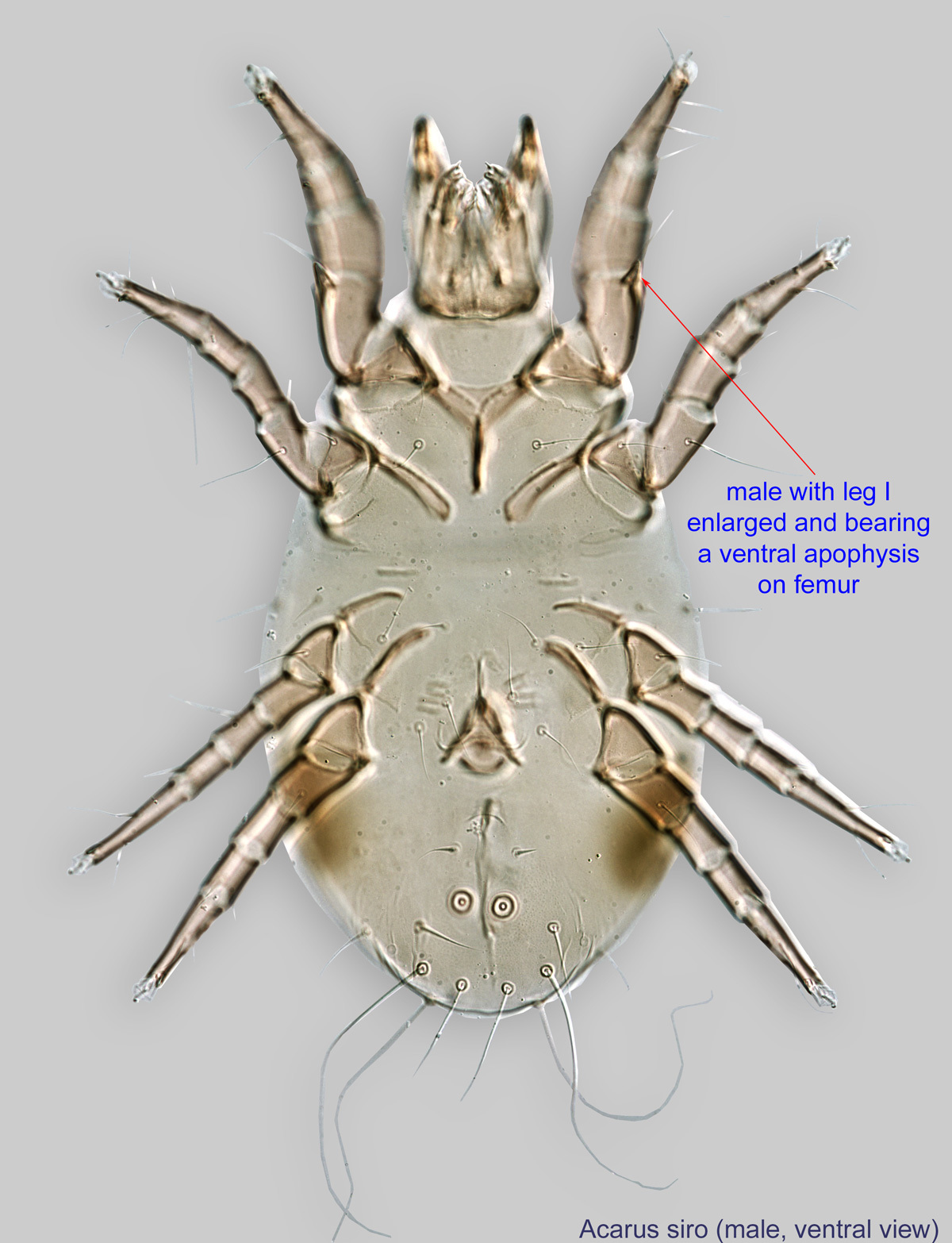
A. siro male, adult, ventral view

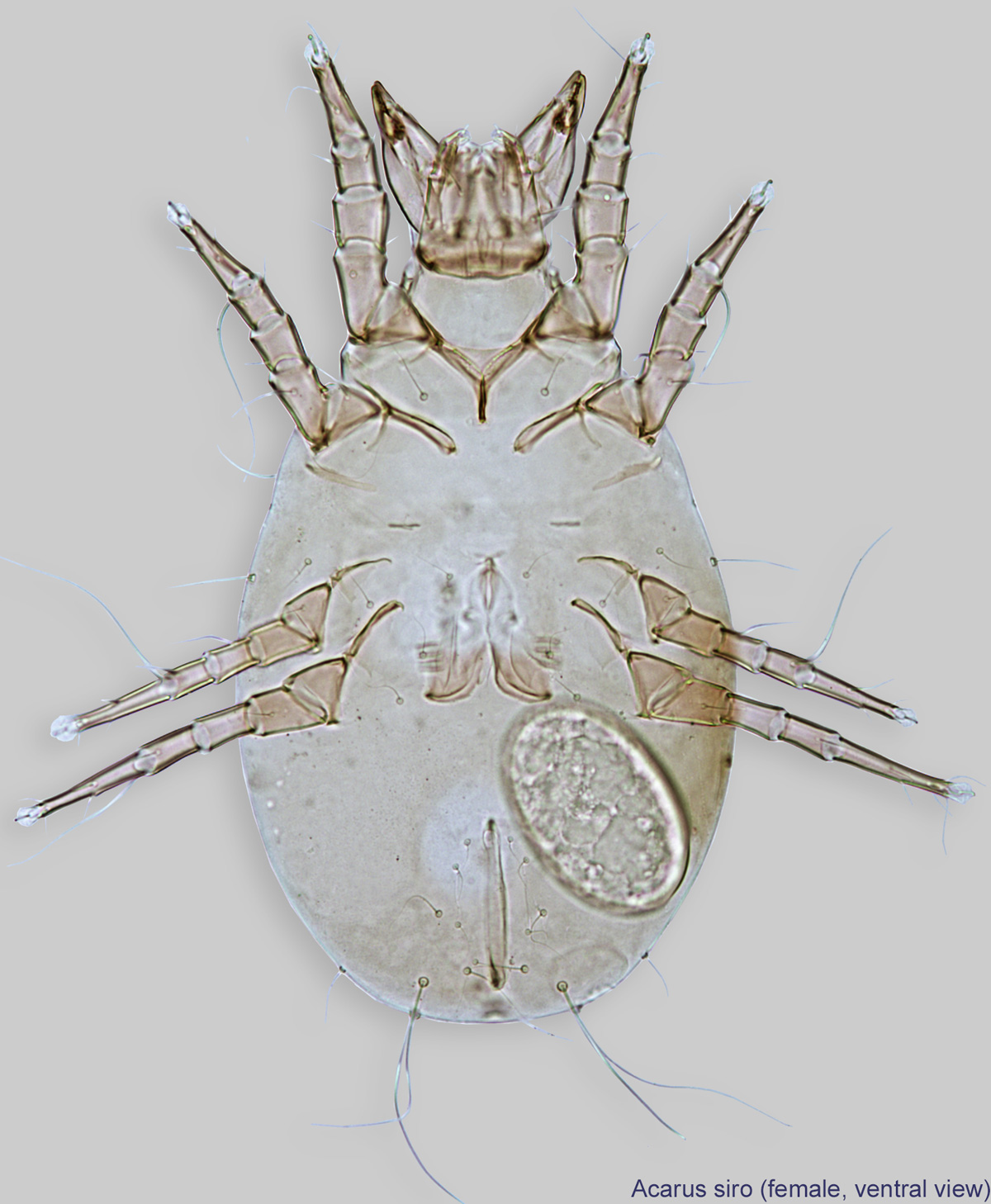
A. siro female, adult, ventral view

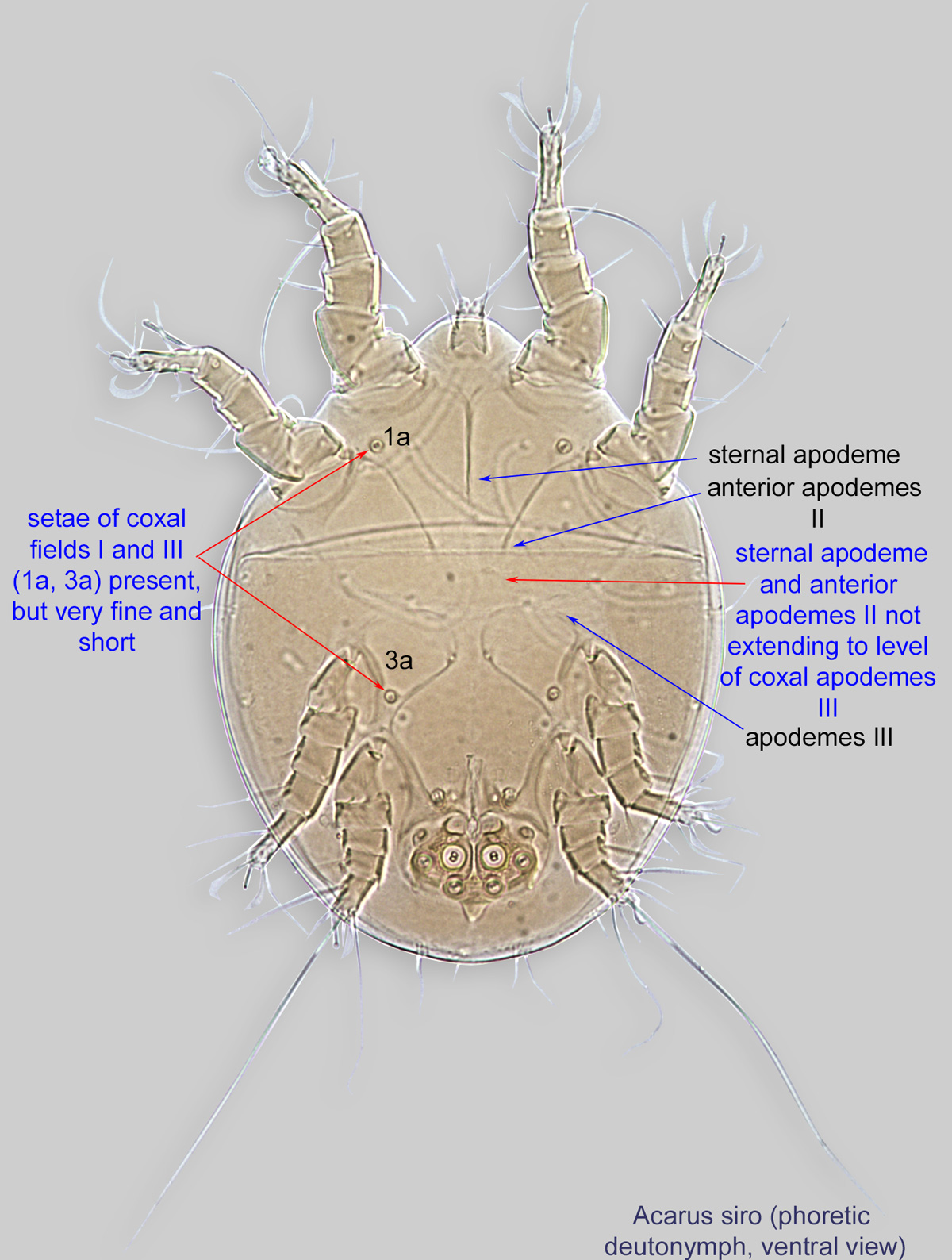
A. siro phoretic deutonymph, ventral view.

== See also ==
- List of mites associated with cutaneous reactions
