= Janet W. Hartley =

American virologist (born 1928)

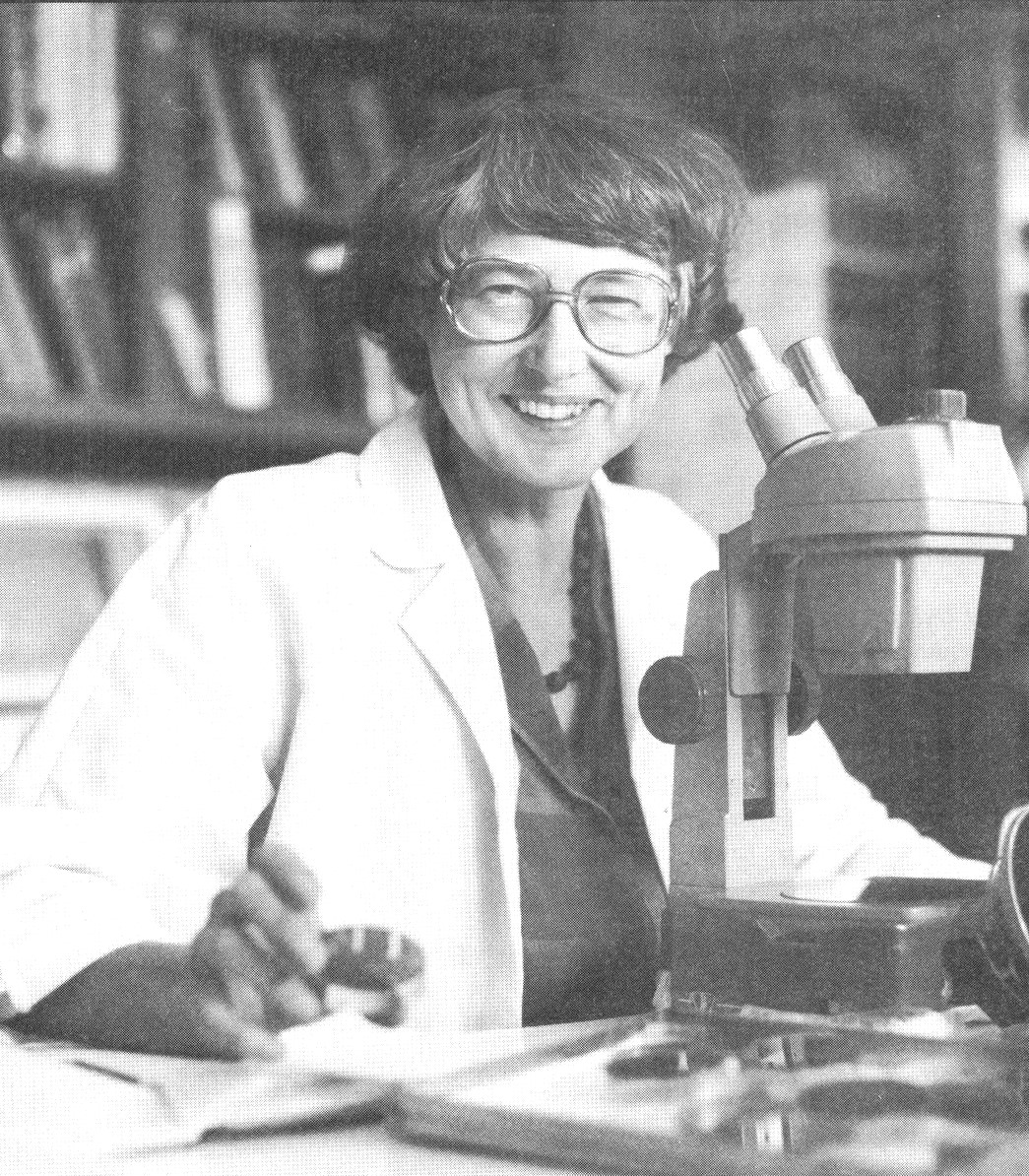
- Hartley c. 1987
- Born: March 25, 1928 (age 98); Washington, D.C.
- Education: University of Maryland, College Park; George Washington University
- Years active: 1953–2009
- Known for: Discovery of virus species; Techniques for quantifying viruses; Identifying connection between viruses and cancer
- Scientific career
- Fields: Virology, oncology
- Workplaces: National Institutes of Health

Janet W. Hartley (born March 25, 1928) is an American virologist who worked at the National Institute of Allergy and Infectious Diseases (NIAID). A Washingtonian, she received degrees in bacteriology and virology research before graduating with a Ph.D. and joining the National Institutes of Health lab of Bob Huebner. Later becoming section head for the virology department, she would spend the next four decades researching a variety of viruses, discovering numerous species, and identifying new methods for quantifying viruses and the involvement of viral infection in cancer development.

== Education ==
Born on March 25, 1928 in Washington, D.C., Hartley started her education in the aftermath of World War Two, joining the University of Maryland, College Park (UMD) and completing a Bachelor's degree in bacteriology in 1949. She wanted to continue her education while also conducting research, so her UMD mentors suggested she apply for a fellowship at George Washington University. Completing her Master's degree in 1951, she continued in her studies to earn a Ph.D. While working on her doctoral degree, she conducted virology research in Bob Huebner's National Institutes of Health (NIH) lab as a laboratory technician starting in 1953. She graduated with her Ph.D. in 1957.

== Career ==
Remaining at the NIH for several decades, she would later become section head in NIAID for the Laboratory of Viral Diseases department. This department was later folded into the Laboratory of Immunopathology and Hartley was made chief for the viral oncology section. She ended up publishing over 200 papers through her work and particularly advanced understanding of viral diseases in mice that would be foundational for HIV research. She also was a part of the editorial board for the Journal of the National Cancer Institute. She retired in 1995, but continued as a volunteer scientist emerita at the NIH until 2009. For her final retirement from scientific work, she established the Wallace Prescott Rowe Memorial Award in 2009 to help fund future virologists from the University of Maryland.

== Research ==
The earliest research Hartley was involved in for her university degrees involved finding ways to effectively isolate and quantitate the number of viruses in a sample, which resulted in her making assay detectors for tissue cultures. Her focus in Huebner's lab was research on Adenoviruses, which had recently been successfully isolated and grown in a lab, expanding understanding of the many diseases caused by the viral family. She then went on to study Cytomegaloviruses, which also formed the basis for her graduate thesis. The growing use of mice as model organisms prompted research into diseases of mice, which then led Huebner's lab alongside Wallace P. Rowe's lab to study Polyoma as the first researched tumor virus. This, in turn, created the general scientific understanding that viruses were capable of causing cancer, previously believed impossible.

Her years of research also included discovering new viruses, including the adenovirus that targets mice, one of the papovaviruses that affect rabbits, and a specially important finding of the cytomegalovirus in monkeys, as this allowed for the prevention of contamination from the cytomegalovirus of vaccines produced with monkeys.

== Organizations ==
While at university, she was a part of the scientific honor society Sigma Xi. Hartley would also go on to become a member of the Society for Experimental Biology and Medicine, the American Society for Microbiology, and the American Association for the Advancement of Science.

== Awards and honors ==
Hartley's scientific work has resulted in multiple related awards being given to her, including the Kimble Methodology Award from the American Public Health Association, the Public Health Service Distinguished Service Medal, and the NIH Director's Award. The 1969 annual awards for the Washington Academy of Sciences saw Hartley named among six for outstanding scientific achievements for her "contributions to animal virology". In 1989, she was given the DHHS Distinguished Service Award by NIH Director Anthony Fauci for her 34 years of contributions to NIAID.
