= Carpoglyphus =

Scientific classification
- Kingdom: Animalia
- Phylum: Arthropoda
- Subphylum: Chelicerata
- Class: Arachnida
- Order: Sarcoptiformes
- Family: Carpoglyphidae
- Genus: Carpoglyphus; Robin, 1869

Type species
- Carpoglyphus passularum Robin, 1869

Species
- Carpoglyphus ganzhouensis; Carpoglyphus lactis; Carpoglyphus munroi; Carpoglyphus nidicolous; Carpoglyphus sturmi; Carpoglyphus wardleorum

Genus of mites

Carpoglyphus is a mite genus in the family Carpoglyphidae. The species Carpoglyphus passularum (a fruit mite) is responsible for a cutaneous condition called grocer's itch.
