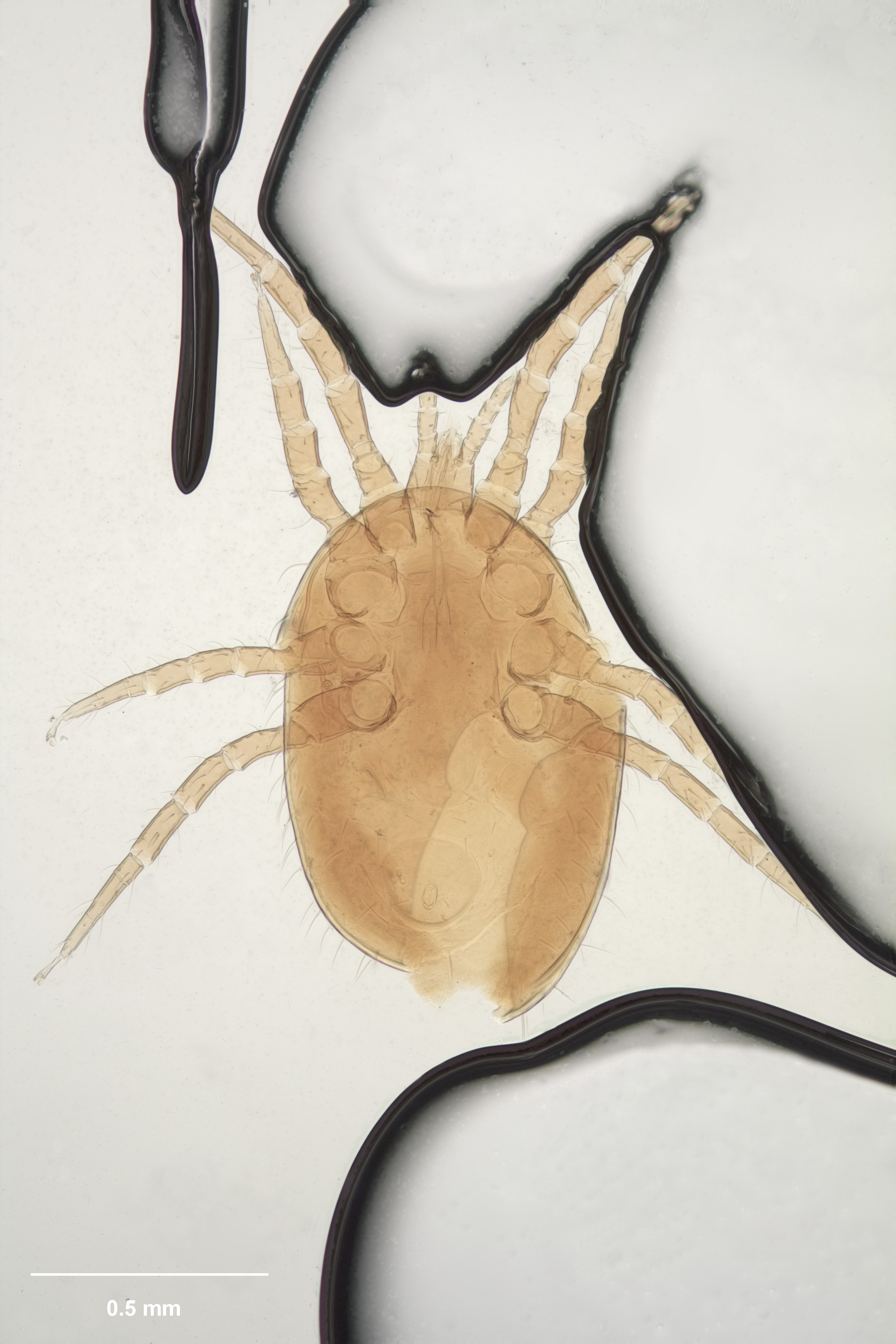
- Liponyssoides eudyptulae

Scientific classification
- Kingdom: Animalia
- Phylum: Arthropoda
- Subphylum: Chelicerata
- Class: Arachnida
- Order: Mesostigmata
- Family: Dermanyssidae
- Genus: Liponyssoides; Hirst, 1913

= Liponyssoides =

Genus of mites

Liponyssoides is a genus of mites in the order Mesostigmata.

== Species ==
- Liponyssoides adsonis Domrow, 1992
- Liponyssoides aegyptius (Hirst, 1913)
- Liponyssoides becki (Allred, 1957)
- Liponyssoides bengalensis Gupta, 1979
- Liponyssoides brasiliensis (Fonseca, 1937)
- Liponyssoides eudyptulae Fain & Galloway, 1993
- Liponyssoides intermedius (Evans & Till, 1964)
- Liponyssoides lukoschusi Domrow, 1979
- Liponyssoides muris (Hirst, 1913)
- Liponyssoides sanguineus (Hirst, 1914)
- Liponyssoides warnekei Domrow, 1963
