= Carpoglyphidae =

Scientific classification
- Kingdom: Animalia
- Phylum: Arthropoda
- Subphylum: Chelicerata
- Class: Arachnida
- Order: Sarcoptiformes
- (unranked): Astigmatina
- Family: Carpoglyphidae; Oudemans, 1923

Species of mite

Carpoglyphidae is a mite family in the order Astigmatina, containing four genera:

- Carpoglyphus Robin, 1869
- Coproglyphus Türk & Türk in Stammer 1957
- Dichotomiopus Fain & A. M. Camerik, 1978
- Pullea Canestrini, 1884
