= Grocer's itch =

- Specialty: Dermatology
- Causes: contact with mites such as Carpoglyphus passularum and Glycyphagus domesticus
- Treatment: corticosteroids or oral antihistamines, Antimicrobial therapy such as permethrin

Grocer's itch is a cutaneous condition characterized by a pruritic dermatitis that occurs from coming into contact with mites such as Carpoglyphus passularum (a fruit mite) or Glycyphagus domesticus (a common house mite). Contact usually occurs when handling food with mites in it, such as figs, dates, prunes, grain, cheese, or other dried foods.

== See also ==
- Grain itch
- Gamasoidosis
- List of mites associated with cutaneous reactions
