= Haller's organ =

Sensory organ on the front legs of ticks

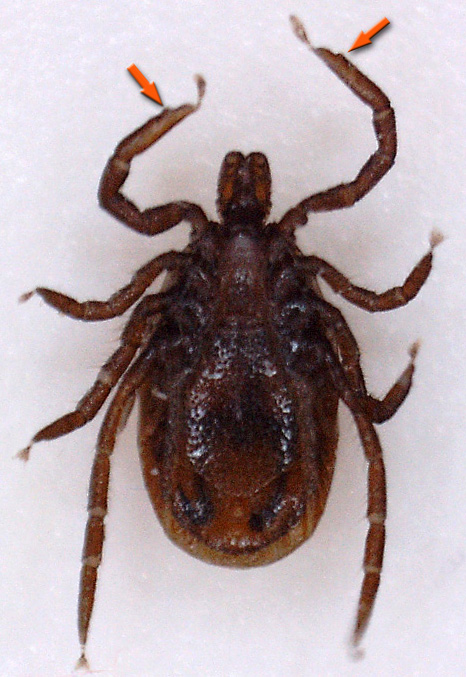
Haller's organ marked by arrows

Haller's organ is a complex sensory organ possessed by hard and soft ticks (Ixodidae and Argasidae). Not found outside of Acari, it is proposed to function like the chemosensation of insect antennae, but is structurally different. Ticks, being obligate parasites, must find a host in order to survive. Bloodmeals are necessary for completion of the life cycle, including reproduction and ontogenetic development. First described in 1881, it was named for its discoverer, German zoologist G. Haller. While Haller initially proposed it was involved in auditory sensation, this was rejected in favor of olfactory sensation by 1905. This theory was supported by Lees' behavioral studies as early as 1948.

Haller's organ is critical in both questing for hosts and mate seeking, detecting them via olfaction and the sensing of humidity, temperature, carbon dioxide, and pheromones. A 2019 study showed that the Haller's organ of Amblyomma americanum and D. variabilis uses infrared detection to sense and move towards heat within the temperature ranges of its hosts.

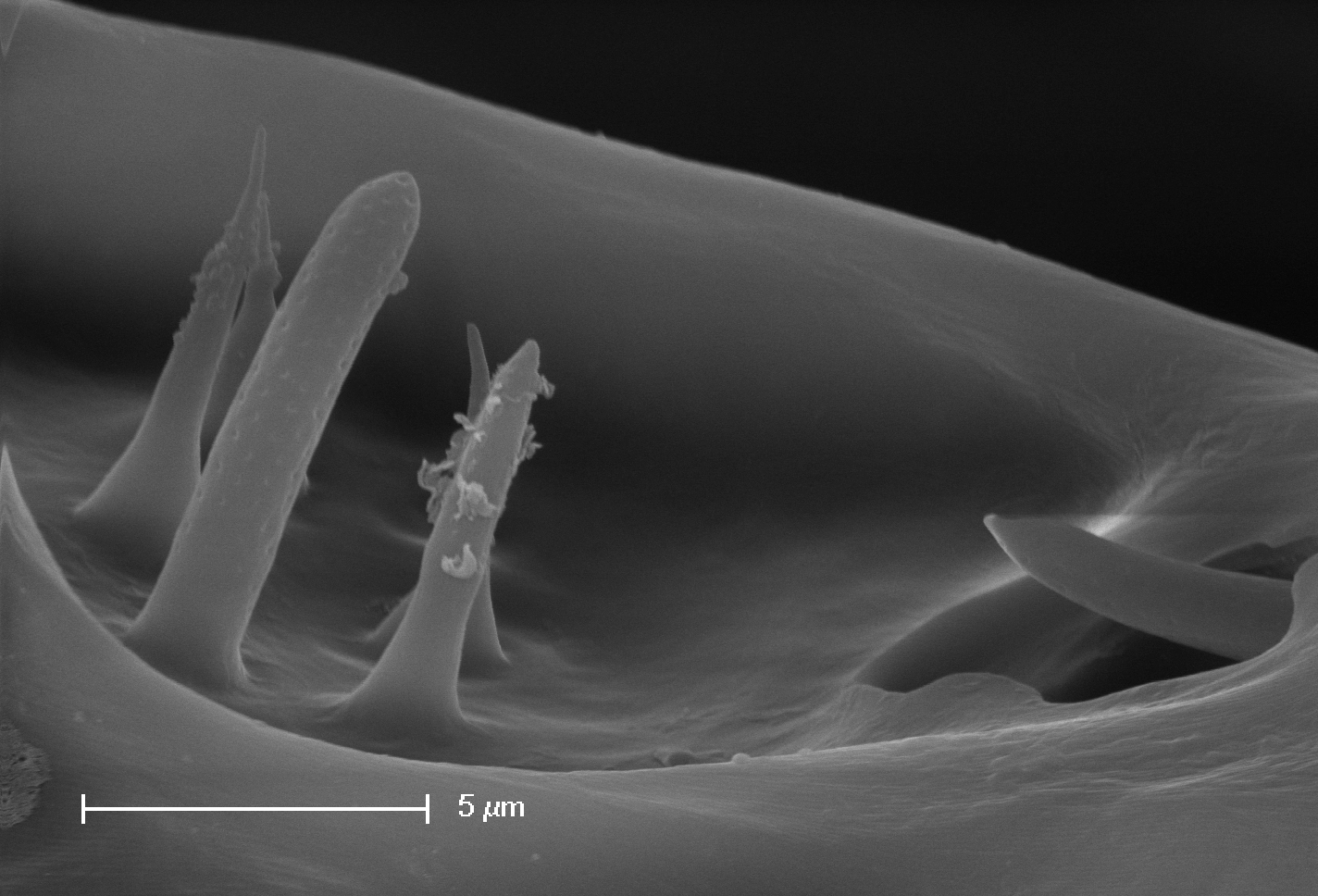
Electron microscope image of the Haller's Organ of an Ixodes ricinus nymph.

Haller's organ is a group of chemosensitive cells concentrated on the tarsus of the forelegs, which ticks wave in front of them as with insect antennae in an alternating up and down fashion, rather than using them for walking. It is a minute cavity at the terminal segment of the first pair of a tick's legs (not the pedipalps). Each one is composed of a pit and a capsule, which contain sensory setae.

== Physiology ==
The mechanism of chemosensation in the Haller's organ is an active subject of research. The morphological diversity of the sensillae within the Haller's organ is believed to indicate that it serves several different functions, including the sensation of olfactory molecules, humidity, and temperature.

=== Thermotaxis ===
A wide variety of tick hosts, being endothermic, emit convective heat and infrared radiation. The Haller's Organ is sensitive to heat via infrared radiation, able to detect humans or a source of 37°Celsius heat up to four meters away. Ticks in the study were most attracted to infrared wavelengths of 880 nm and were found to demonstrate thermotaxis toward the source, which importantly, was disrupted by either removing the forelegs or applying DEET to a surface.

=== Chemosensation ===
A 2017 study to elucidate the mechanisms of chemosensation in ticks compared their transcriptomics to those of insects, finding a lack of similarity in proteins that bind odors, lipocalins involved in chemosensation, or other motifs of insect olfactory sensation. Rather, the researchers found evidence of G-protein coupled receptor (GPCR), G_{αo} and β-arrestin specific to the transcriptome of the Haller's organ, indicating that the Haller's organ chemosensation functions through a pathway involving a GPCR. Further investigation found these were downregulated after blood feeding, indicating a connection with host seeking. The G_{α} subunit was found to likely be of the G_{αo} type seen in the chemosensory mechanism of insects and C. elegans. Carr found it likely requires a quorum or minimum number of chemoreceptors to be activated in order to initiate the signal transduction cascade, and that multiple stimuli could contribute to an action potential stimulating neuronal responses. Olfactory response neurons innervating the Haller's organ sensillae receive the signal, which is then carried to the brain, producing a behavioral response.

Phenols have been found to be chemosensory stimuli for ticks, as well as tsetse flies and mosquitoes. These compounds have been identified in such substances as female tick sex pheromones and secretions of white-tailed deer.

CO_{2} and human breath have been shown to elicit a response from the tick Amblyomma variegatum. Steullet's 1992 study showed that a source of 3-5% CO_{2} at up to 80 cm distance was found to strongly attract individual ticks, who may quest for potential hosts such as grazing animals from among leaf litter on the ground. Amblyomma hebraeum will detect and seek grazing ungulates from several meters away. The Haller's organ contains one CO_{2}-excited receptor and one CO_{2} repelled receptor within its posterior capsule; a combination of the action of these two receptors allows the tick to be extremely sensitive to minute changes in ambient CO_{2} concentration.

== Anatomical structure ==
The Haller's organ has been examined via scanning and transmission electron microscopy. A 1970 study found that it appears similar to the electron micrographs of sensilla coeloconica of grasshoppers and sensilla basonica of insects.

The structure consists of a series of an anterior pit and a posterior capsule. The anterior pit contains seven sensilla (A1–A7) of varying morphology, though all with thick membranes and innervated by two to nine neurons. A1 and A2, fairly similar in structure, are proposed to be chemoreceptors and contain plugged pores. A3 and A5, considered similar morphologically to sensilla coeloconica of grasshopper antennae, may function in olfaction or humidity and temperature.

The posterior capsule contains seven sensilla of uniform morphology, with thin membranes, epithelial projections, pores and glands, and are innervated by three to five neurons. These are well-shielded from desiccation and mechanical abrasion, while still allowing diffusion of chemosensory molecules such as CO_{2} into the capsule. Carr and Salgado, in their 2019 study on heat as an attractant for ticks via Haller's organ, proposed that the aperture of the posterior capsule allows for directional detection of infrared radiation.
