= Baker's itch =

Skin condition caused by the flour mite

- Specialty: Dermatology
- Causes: bites of Acarus siro

Baker's itch is a cutaneous reaction caused by bites of Acarus siro, the flour mite.

== See also ==
- List of mites associated with cutaneous reactions
- List of cutaneous conditions
