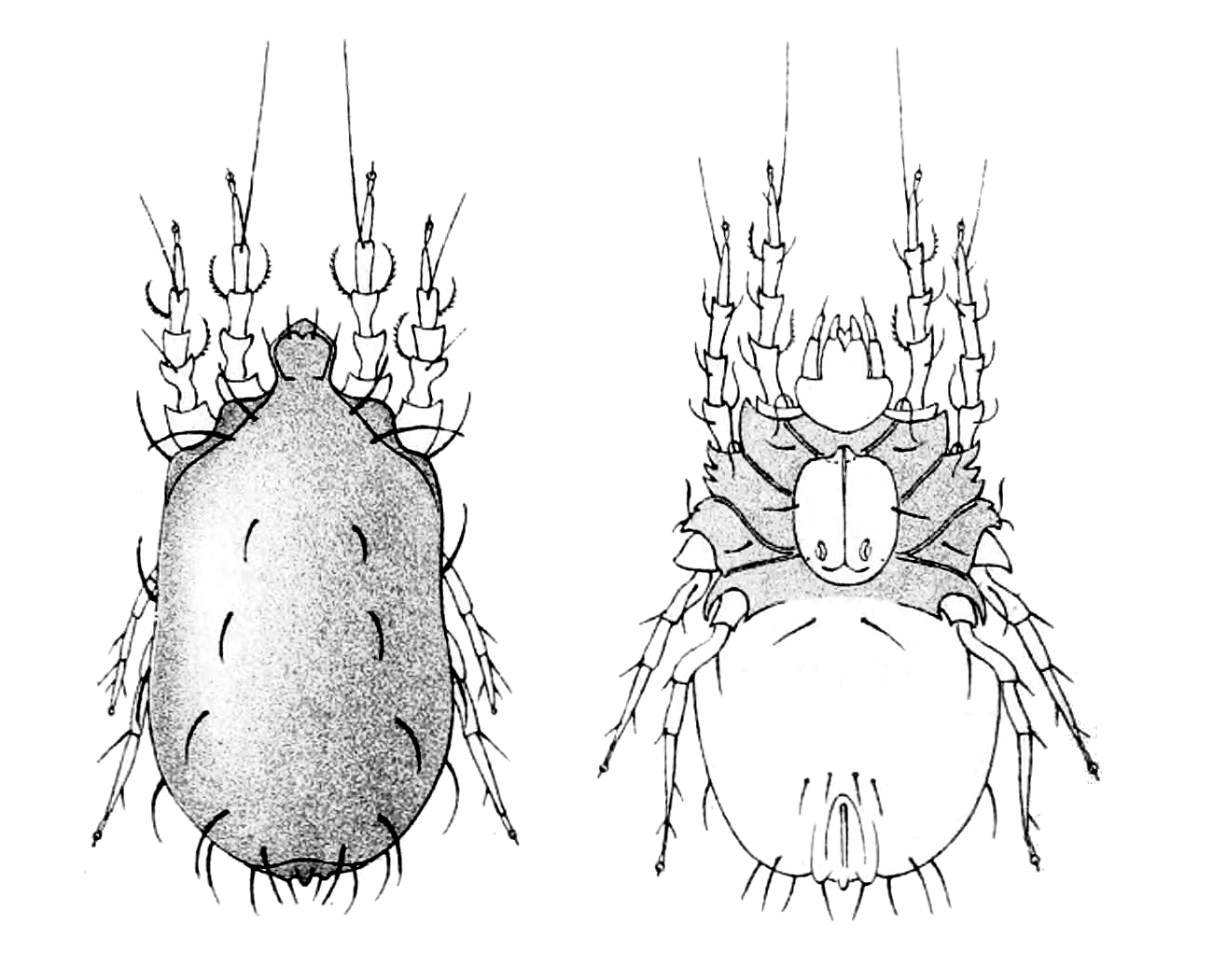
- Gohieria fusca

Scientific classification
- Kingdom: Animalia
- Phylum: Arthropoda
- Subphylum: Chelicerata
- Class: Arachnida
- Order: Oribatida
- Superfamily: Glycyphagoidea
- Family: Glycyphagidae

= Glycyphagidae =

Family of mites

Glycyphagidae is a family of mites in the order Astigmata. There are more than 25 genera and 100 described species in Glycyphagidae.

The natural habitat of most species of this family is nests of rodents, insectivores, and opossums, although many now live among humans in stored food or housing.

== Genera ==
These 27 genera belong to the family Glycyphagidae:

- Apodemopus Fain, 1967
- Asiolabidophorus Lukoschus, Gerrits & Fain, 1977
- Austroglycyphagus
- Dermacarus Haller, 1880
- Diamesoglyphus Zachvatkin, 1941
- Dipodomyopus Fain & Lukoschus, 1978
- Eupygopus Lukoschus, Rothuizen & Fain, 1977
- Glycyphagoides
- Glycyphagus Hering, 1838
- Gohieria Oudemans, 1939
- Hypodectes Filippi, 1861
- Labidophorus Kramer, 1877
- Lepidoglyphus Zakhvatkin, 1936
- Lophioglyphus Volgin, 1964
- Marsupialichus Fain, 1967
- Mediolabidophorus Fain & Lukoschus, 1978
- Melesodectes Fain & Lukoschus, 1968
- Metalabidophorus Fain, 1967
- Microlabidopus Fain, 1967
- Neoxenoryctes Fain & Philips, 1977
- Orycteroxenus Zachvatkin, 1941
- Scalopacarus Fain & Whitaker, 1973
- Soriculopus Fain & Lukoschus, 1980
- Xenocastor Zachvatkin, 1941
- Xenoryctes Zachvatkin, 1941
- † Marmosopus Fain & Lukoschus, 1977
- † Neotetracopus Fain, 1969
