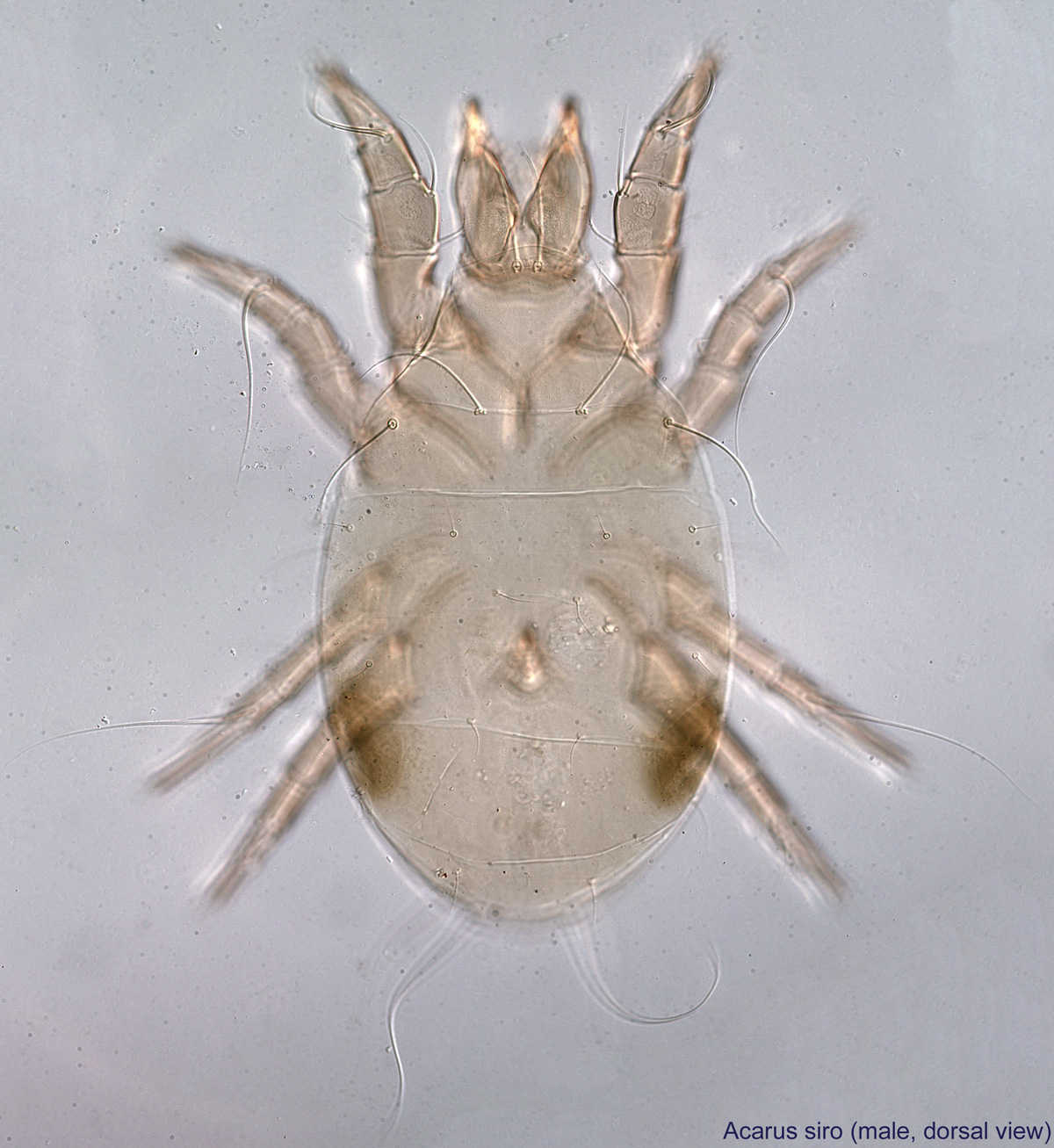
- Acarus siro, male

Scientific classification
- Domain: Eukaryota
- Kingdom: Animalia
- Phylum: Arthropoda
- Subphylum: Chelicerata
- Class: Arachnida
- Order: Sarcoptiformes
- Family: Acaridae
- Subfamily: Acarinae
- Genus: Acarus; Linnaeus, 1758

= Acarus =

Genus of mites

Acarus is a genus of mites in the family Acaridae.

== Species ==
- Acarus ananas (Tryon, 1898)
- Acarus beschkovi (Mitov, 1994)
- Acarus bomiensis Wang, 1982
- Acarus calcarabellus (Griffiths, 1965)
- Acarus chaetoxysilos Griffiths, 1970
- Acarus ebrius Ashfaq, Akhtar & Chaudhri, 1986
- Acarus farinae DeGeer, 1778
- Acarus farris (Oudemans, 1905)
- Acarus fengxianensis Wang, 1985
- Acarus gracilis Hughes, 1957
- Acarus griffithsi Ranganath & Channa Basavanna, in Ranganath, Channa Basavanna & Krishna-Rao 1981
- Acarus immobilis Griffiths, 1964
- Acarus inaequalis (Banks, 1916)
- Acarus lushanensis Jiang, 1992
- Acarus monopsyllus Fain & Schwan, 1984
- Acarus nidicolus Griffiths, 1970
- Acarus queenslandiae (Canestrini, 1884)
- Acarus rhombeus Koch & Berendt, 1854
- Acarus sentus Ashfaq, Akhtar & Chaudhri, 1986
- Acarus siro Linnaeus, 1758
- Acarus umbonis Ashfaq, Akhtar & Chaudhri, 1986
