= Grain itch =

- Other names: Barley itch, mattress itch, prairie itch, straw itch.
- Specialty: Dermatology

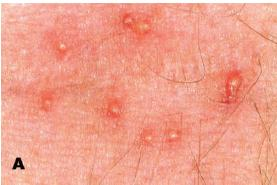
Bites from Pyemotes herfsi mites

Grain itch is a cutaneous condition caused by several types of mites, and characterized by intense pruritus.

== See also ==
- Grocer's itch
- List of cutaneous conditions
- List of mites associated with cutaneous reactions
