= List of mites associated with cutaneous reactions =

Many mites can bite human skin and cause cutaneous reaction and/or disease. Mites which cannot bite humans may also transmit disease or cause allergies.

Mites associated with cutaneous reactions
Scientific name	Common name(s)	Disease(s) caused and/or transmitted
Acarus siro	Flour mite	Baker's itch
Glyciphagus domesticus		Grocer's itch
Carpoglyphus passularum	Fruit mite	Grocer's itch
Cheyletiella spp		Walking dandruff (Cheyletiella dermatitis, cheyletiellosis)
Cheyletus eruditus		Grain itch
Dermanyssus gallinae	Bird mite Red Poultry mite	Gamasoidosis
Dermatophagoides farinae	American house dust mite	Oral mite anaphylaxis (OMA), Asthma
Dermatophagoides pteronyssinus	European house dust mite	Oral mite anaphylaxis (OMA), Asthma
Laelaps echidnina	Spiny rat mite	Rodent mite dermatitis
Lepidoglyphus destructor	Hay mite	
Leptotrombidium deliense	Chigger; Trombiculid mite	Scrub typhus
Liponyssoides sanguineus (Allodermanyssus sanguineus)	House mouse mite	Rodent mite dermatitis, Rickettsialpox
Ornithonyssus bacoti	Tropical rat mite	Rodent mite dermatitis
Ornithonyssus bursa	Bird mite Tropical fowl mite	Gamasoidosis
Ornithonyssus sylviarum	Bird mite Northern fowl mite	Gamasoidosis
Psoroptidae spp	Carpet mite	Feather pillow dermatitis
Pyemotes herfsi	Itch mite	Grain itch
Sarcoptes scabiei	Itch mite	Scabies
Trombicula alfreddugesi	Chigger; Harvest mite	Grain itch
Trombicula autumnalis	Chigger; Harvest mite	Grain itch
Tyrophagus neiswanderi	Cheese mite	Grain itch

== See also ==
- List of conditions associated with café au lait macules
- List of contact allergens
- List of cutaneous conditions associated with increased risk of nonmelanoma skin cancer
- List of cutaneous conditions associated with internal malignancy
- List of cutaneous conditions caused by mutations in keratins
- List of cutaneous neoplasms associated with systemic syndromes
- List of cutaneous conditions caused by problems with junctional proteins
- List of dental abnormalities associated with cutaneous conditions
- List of genes mutated in cutaneous conditions
- List of genes mutated in pigmented cutaneous lesions
- List of histologic stains that aid in diagnosis of cutaneous conditions
- List of human leukocyte antigen alleles associated with cutaneous conditions
- List of immunofluorescence findings for autoimmune bullous conditions
- List of inclusion bodies that aid in diagnosis of cutaneous conditions
- List of keratins expressed in the human integumentary system
- List of migrating cutaneous conditions
- List of radiographic findings associated with cutaneous conditions
- List of specialized glands within the human integumentary system
- List of spiders associated with cutaneous reactions
- List of target antigens in pemphigoid
- List of target antigens in pemphigus
- List of verrucous carcinoma subtypes
- List of xanthoma variants associated with hyperlipoproteinemia subtypes
