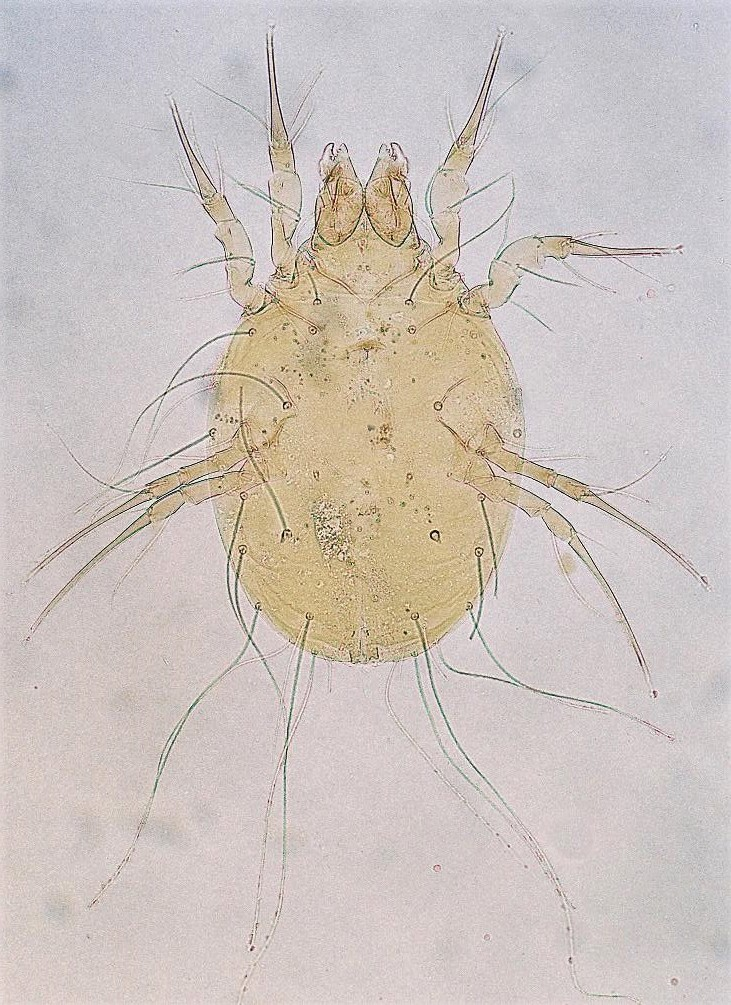

Scientific classification
- Domain: Eukaryota
- Kingdom: Animalia
- Phylum: Arthropoda
- Subphylum: Chelicerata
- Class: Arachnida
- Order: Oribatida
- Family: Glycyphagidae
- Genus: Glycyphagus; Hering, 1838

= Glycyphagus =

Genus of mites

Glycyphagus is a genus of Astigmatina in the family Glycyphagidae.

== Description ==
In adults of Glycyphagus, the prodorsum lacks external vertical setae ve. The internal vertical setae vi are long and barbed, and located posterior to the anterior margin of the propodosoma. The scapular setae si and se are arranged in a trapezoid or rectangle shape. In some species, there is a prodorsal sclerotization called a crista metopica. Some of the dorsal setae are long and heavily barbed. On the ventral side of the body, the subcapitulum has a distinct pattern of ventral ridges, and near the posterior margin of the body is the anus. The tibiae of the first two leg pairs have two ventral setae each. The tarsal claws are simple and small. Members of subgenus Lepidoglyphus have subtarsal scales on the legs.

Females usually have a short external copulatory tube at the posterior end of the body. Males lack paranal suckers or tarsal suckers on the fourth leg pair.

== Ecology ==
Mites in this genus live in a wide variety of habitats, including nests of animals (e.g. rodents, birds, bees), stored products, house dust, hay and grass. They feed on various organic materials.

To disperse, Glycyphagus use insects such as bees (phoresis) or air currents.

== Species ==
These species belong to the genus Glycyphagus:

- Glycyphagus destructor (Schrank, 1781)^{b g}
- Glycyphagus domesticus (De Geer, 1778)^{b g}
- Glycyphagus hypudaei (Koch, 1841) ^{g}
- Glycyphagus michaeli (Oudemans, 1903) ^{b}
- Glycyphagus ornatus Kramer, 1881^{b g}
- Glycyphagus pilosus Oudemans, 1906^{g}
- Glycyphagus privatus Oudemans, 1903^{b g}

Data sources: g = GBIF, b = Bee Mite ID

== Gallery ==
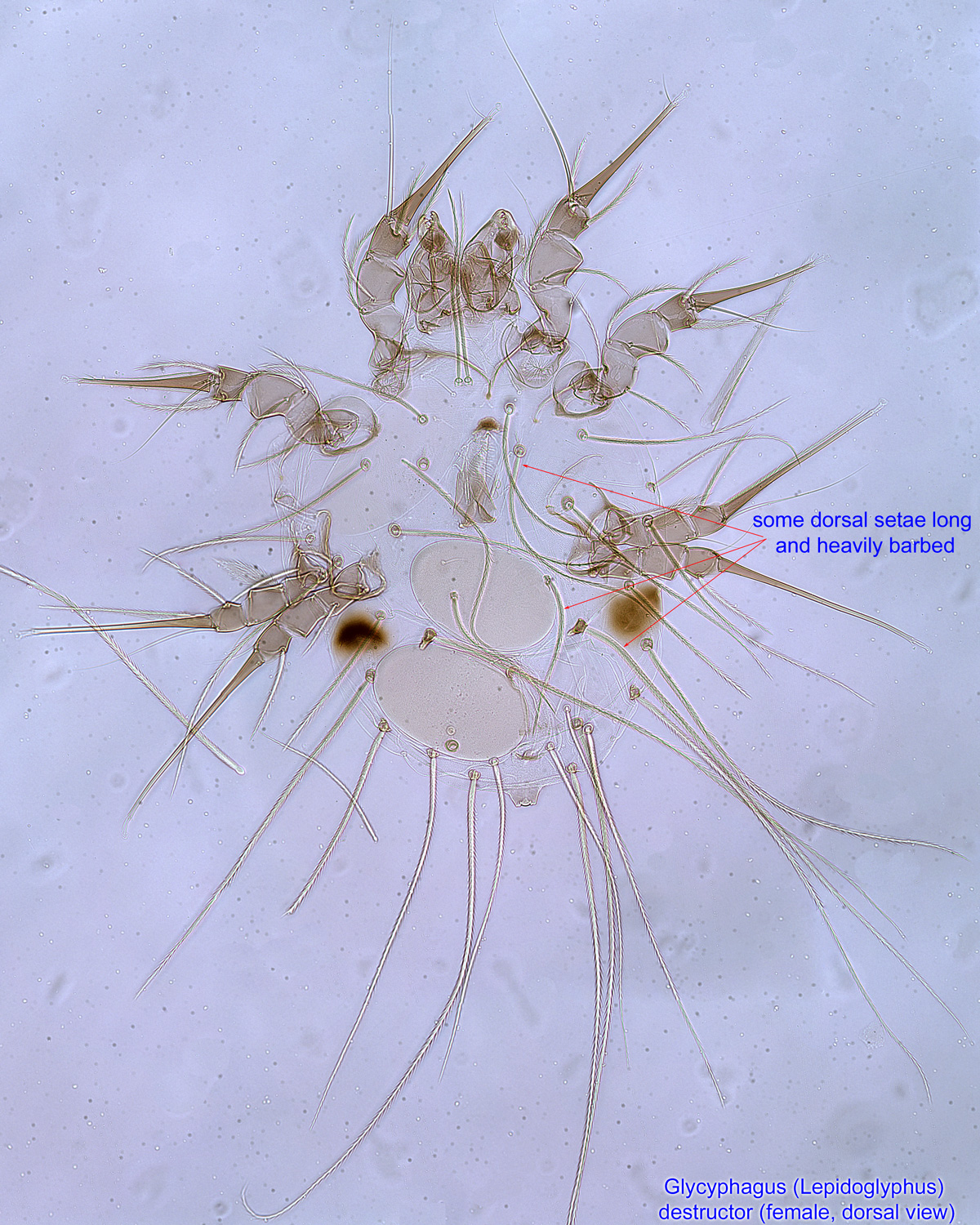
Glycyphagus destructor female dorsum

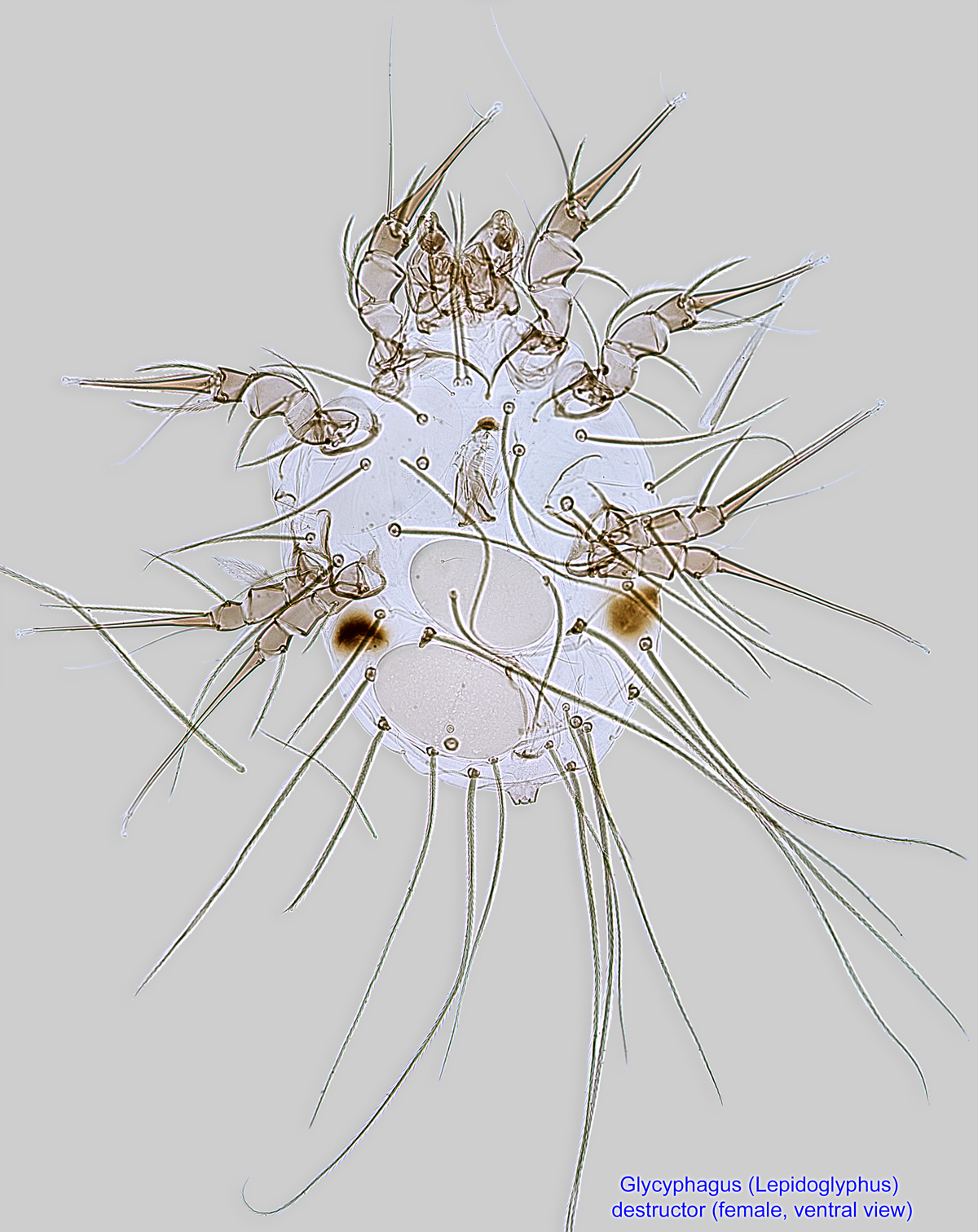
Glycyphagus destructor female venter

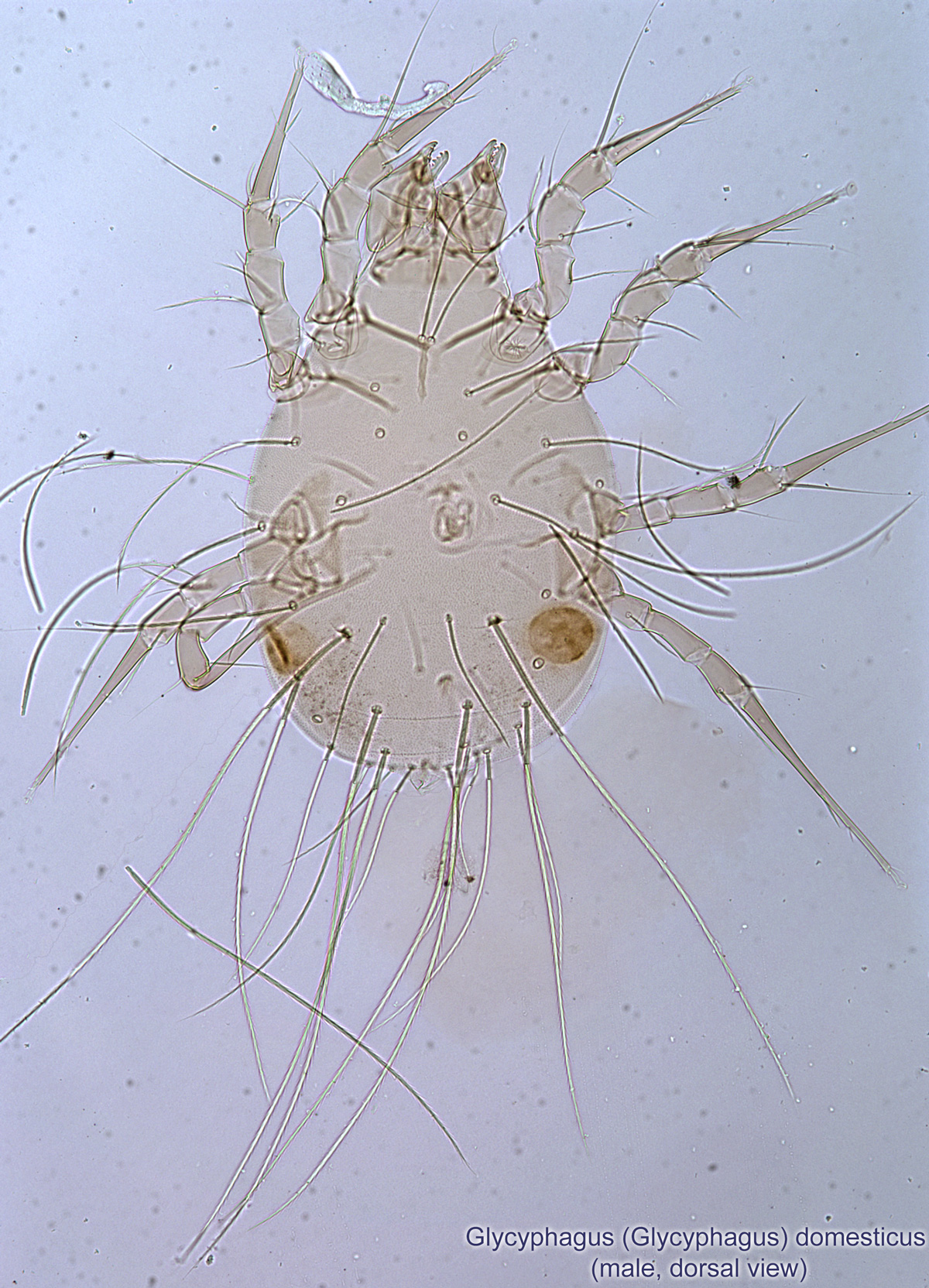
Glycyphagus domesticus male dorsum

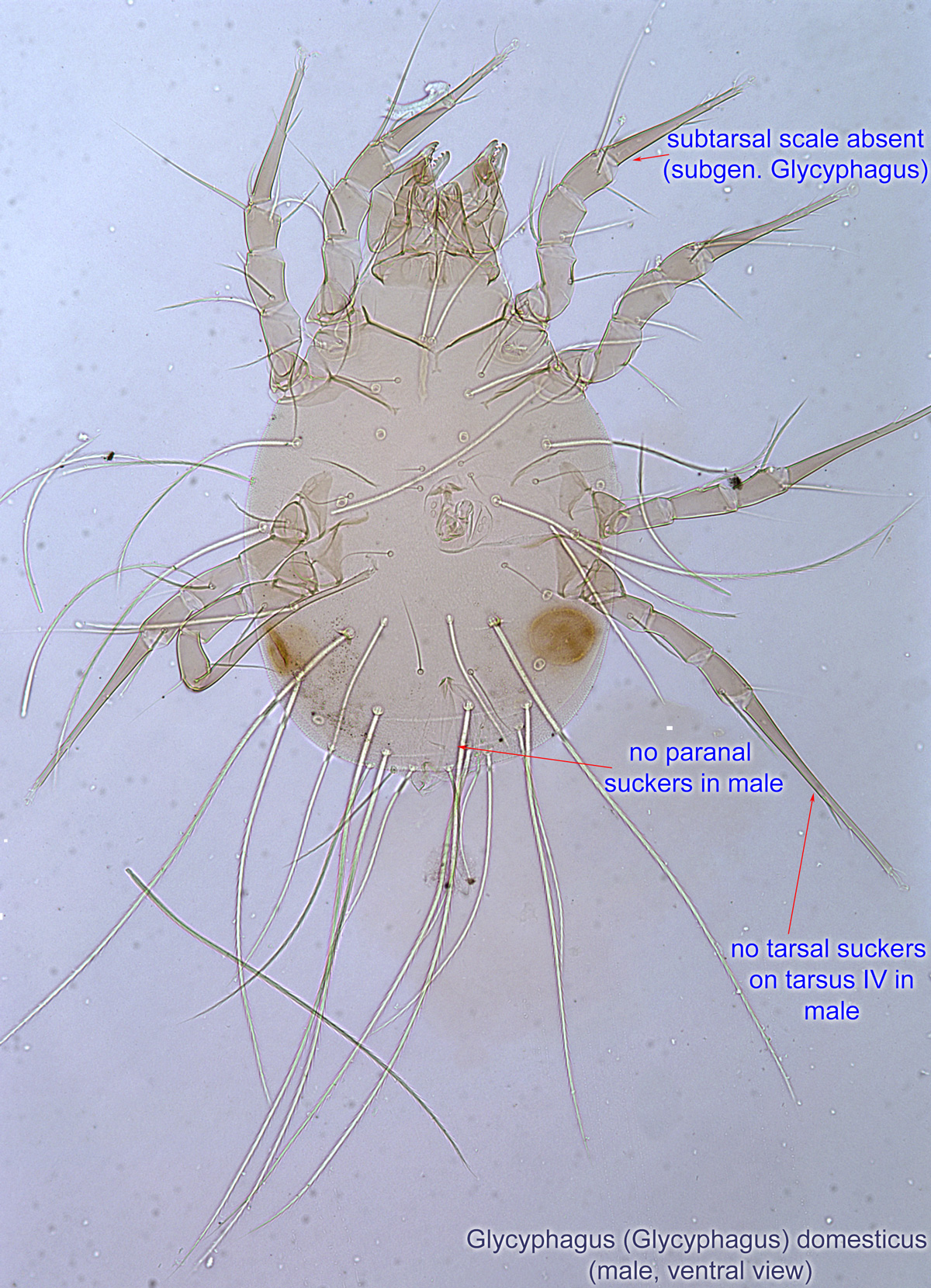
Glycyphagus domesticus male venter
