= Wallace P. Rowe =

American virologist (1926–1983)

Wallace Prescott Rowe (February 20, 1926, Baltimore – July 4, 1983, Baltimore) was an American virologist, known for his research on retroviruses and oncoviruses and as a co-discoverer (with Robert J. Huebner and three other researchers in 1953) of adenoviruses.

Rowe graduated in 1945 with a B.S. from the College of William and Mary. In 1945 he served in the U.S. Navy. In 1948 he graduated with an M.D. from Johns Hopkins Medical School. From 1949 to 1952 he was a virologist at the Naval Medical Research Institute in Bethesda, Maryland, where he worked in Erich Traub's laboratory. From 1952 until his death in 1983 Rowe was a federal civil servant employed by the U.S. Public Health Service (USPHS) and the National Institute of Allergy and Infectious Diseases (NIAID) of the National Institutes of Health (NIH). In 1952 he started with the tile and pay grade of assistant surgeon. He was promoted in 1956 to full surgeon and in 1968 to chief of the laboratory for NIAID. From 1960 to 1974 he taught part-time at Howard University.

Rowe and his colleagues showed that retroviruses can cause leukemia in mice. He was among the first "to recognize the role of the immune response in the pathogenesis of murine lymphocytic choriomeningitis." He was a pioneer in research on adenoviruses and their role in human diseases.

The discoveries of adenoviruses by Rowe et al. (1953) and by Hilleman and Werner (1954) aroused great interest and excitement among clinicians and virologists alike in that no new acute viral respiratory disease of humans had been isolated since the identification of influenza virus 20 years earlier (Smith et al., 1933).

Rowe married Marjorie Louise Power (1927–2006) on 29 May 1948 in Williamsburg, Virginia. They had a son and a daughter. After divorcing his first wife, Wallace Rowe married the virologist Paula Pitha (1937–2015).

== Awards and honors ==
- 1960 — Eli Lilly and Company Award in bacteriology or immunology
- 1970 — USPHS Meritorious Service Medal
- 1972 — Rockefeller Public Service Award
- 1974 — Howard Taylor Ricketts Award
- 1975 — Membership in the National Academy of Sciences
- 1976 — Selman A. Waksman Award in Microbiology
- 1979 — Paul Ehrlich and Ludwig Darmstaedter Prize
- 1981 — Alfred P. Sloan Jr. Prize
