= Liponyssoides sanguineus =

Scientific classification
- Kingdom: Animalia
- Phylum: Arthropoda
- Subphylum: Chelicerata
- Class: Arachnida
- Order: Mesostigmata
- Family: Dermanyssidae
- Genus: Liponyssoides
- Species: L. sanguineus

Binomial name
- Liponyssoides sanguineus (Hirst, 1914)

Species of mite

Liponyssoides sanguineus is a species of mite that infests the house mouse (Mus musculus).

It can transmit human disease, is associated with causing rodent mite dermatitis in humans and is noted for carrying Rickettsia akari, which causes rickettsialpox.

It was formerly known as Allodermanyssus sanguineus.

== See also ==
- List of mites associated with cutaneous reactions
