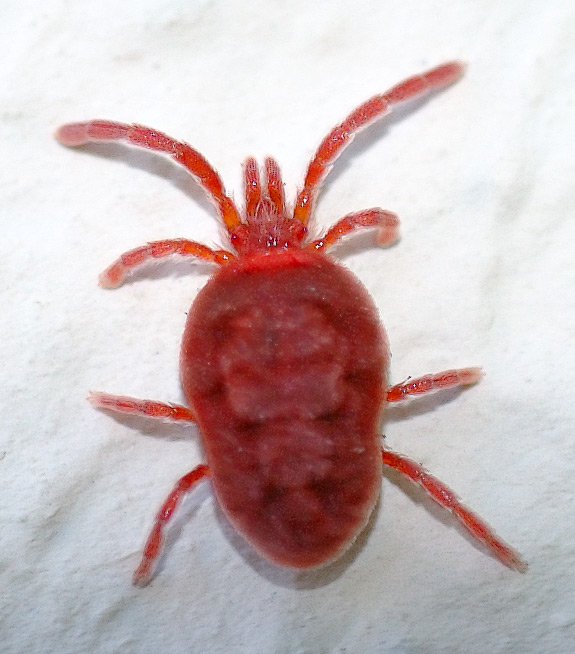
- Trombidium holosericeum mite (Acariformes)
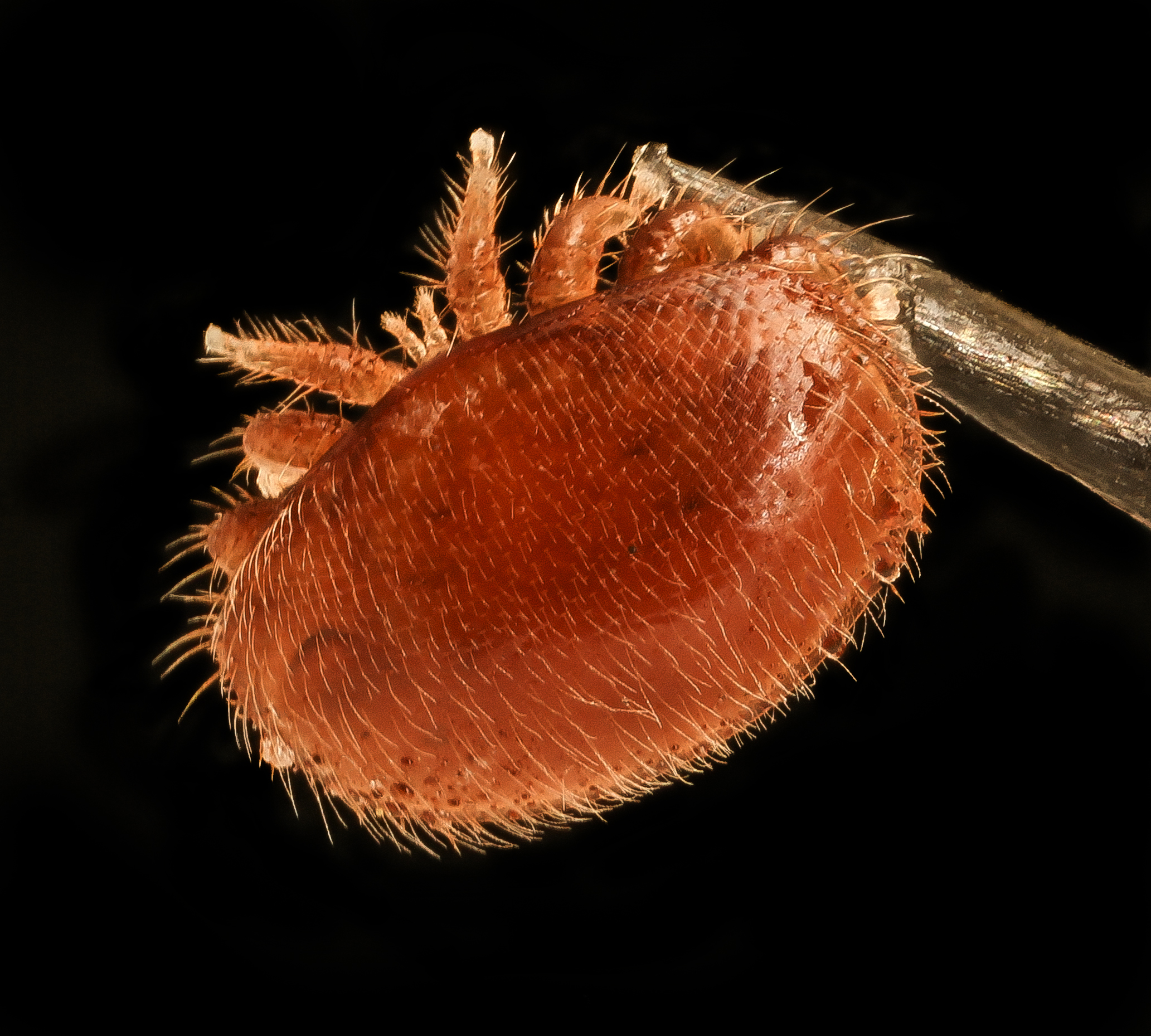
- Varroa destructor (Parasitiformes)

Scientific classification
- Kingdom: Animalia
- Phylum: Arthropoda
- Subphylum: Chelicerata
- Class: Arachnida

Mites are found in two superorders
- Acariformes; Parasitiformes

Cladistically included but traditionally excluded taxa
- Varies by source as of August 2026

= Mite =

Mites Temporal range: Early Devonian – Present, 410–0 Ma

Small eight-legged arthropod

Mites are small arachnids (eight-legged arthropods) of two large orders, the Acariformes and the Parasitiformes, which were historically grouped together in the subclass Acari. However, most recent genetic analyses do not recover the two as each other's closest relative within Arachnida, rendering the group invalid as a clade. Most mites are tiny, less than 1 mm (0.04 in) in length, and have a simple, unsegmented body plan. The small size of most species makes them easily overlooked; some species live in water, many live in soil as decomposers, others live on plants, sometimes creating galls, while others are predators or parasites. This last type includes the commercially destructive Varroa parasite of honey bees, as well as scabies mites of humans. Most species are harmless to humans, but a few are associated with allergies or may transmit diseases.

The scientific discipline devoted to the study of mites is called acarology.

== Evolution and taxonomy ==
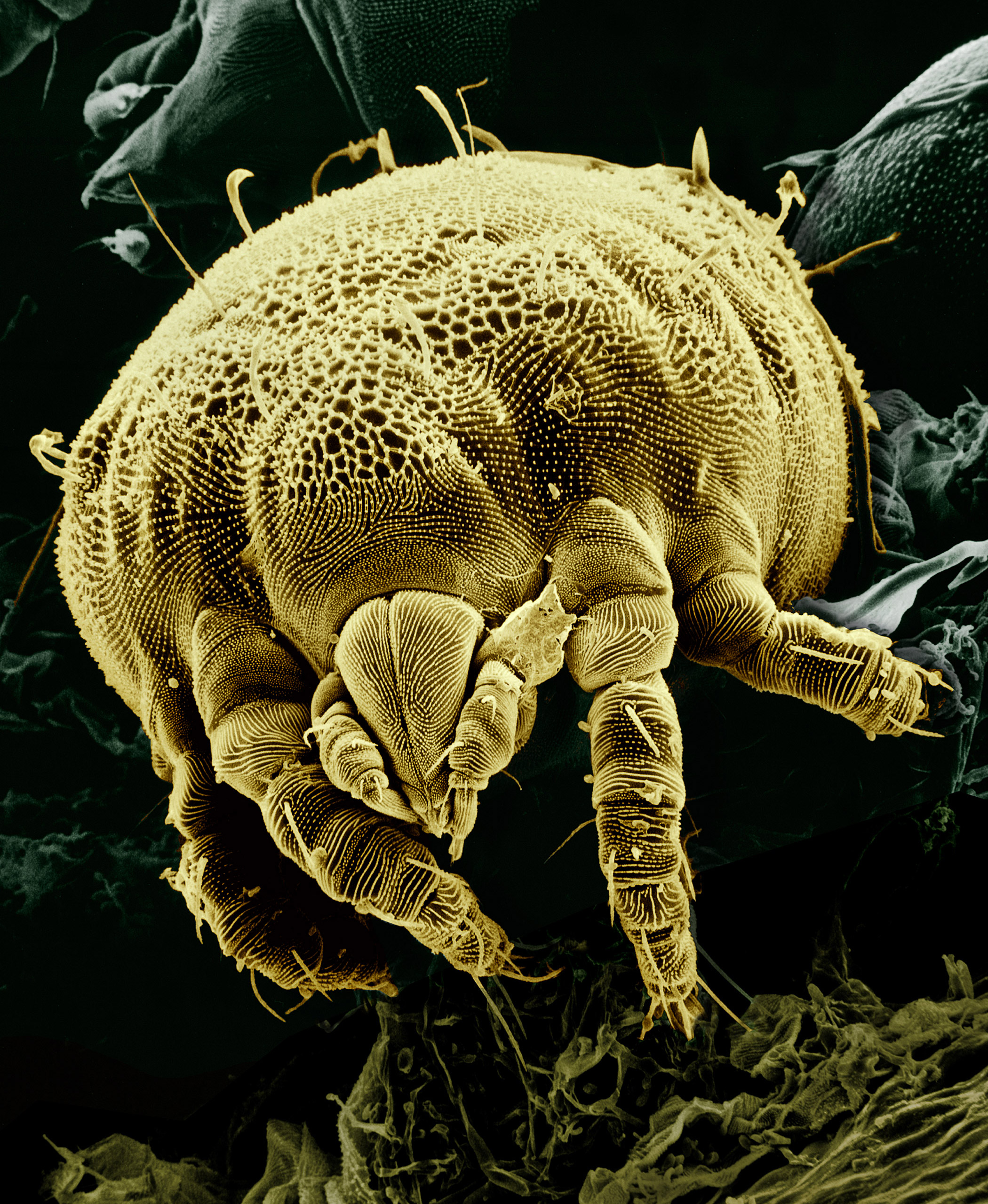
The microscopic mite Lorryia formosa (Tydeidae)

Mites are not a defined taxon, but the term is used for two distinct groups of arachnids, the Acariformes and the Parasitiformes. The phylogeny of the Acari has been relatively little studied, but molecular information from ribosomal DNA is being extensively used to understand relationships between groups. The 18 S rRNA gene provides information on relationships among phyla and superphyla, while the ITS2, and the 18S ribosomal RNA and 28S ribosomal RNA genes, provide clues at deeper levels.

=== Taxonomy ===
- Superorder Parasitiformes—ticks and a variety of mites
  - Opilioacarida – a small order of large mites that superficially resemble harvestmen (Opiliones), hence their name
  - Holothyrida – small group of predatory mites native to former Gondwana landmasses
  - Ixodida – ticks
  - Mesostigmata – a large order of predatory and parasitic mites
    - Trigynaspida – large, diverse order
    - Monogynaspida – diverse order of parasitic and predatory mites
    - Sejida – small order of mites containing five families
- Superorder Acariformes – the most diverse group of mites
  - Endeostigmata (probably paraphyletic)
  - Eriophyoidea – gall mites and relatives
  - Trombidiformes – plant parasitic mites (spider mites, peacock mites, red-legged earth mites, etc.), snout mites, chiggers, hair follicle mites, velvet mites, water mites, etc.
    - Sphaerolichida – small order of mites containing two families
    - Prostigmata – large order of sucking mites
  - Sarcoptiformes
    - Oribatida – oribatid mites, beetle mites, armored mites (formerly known as Cryptostigmata)
    - Astigmatina – stored product, fur, feather, dust, and human itch mites, etc.

=== Fossil record ===
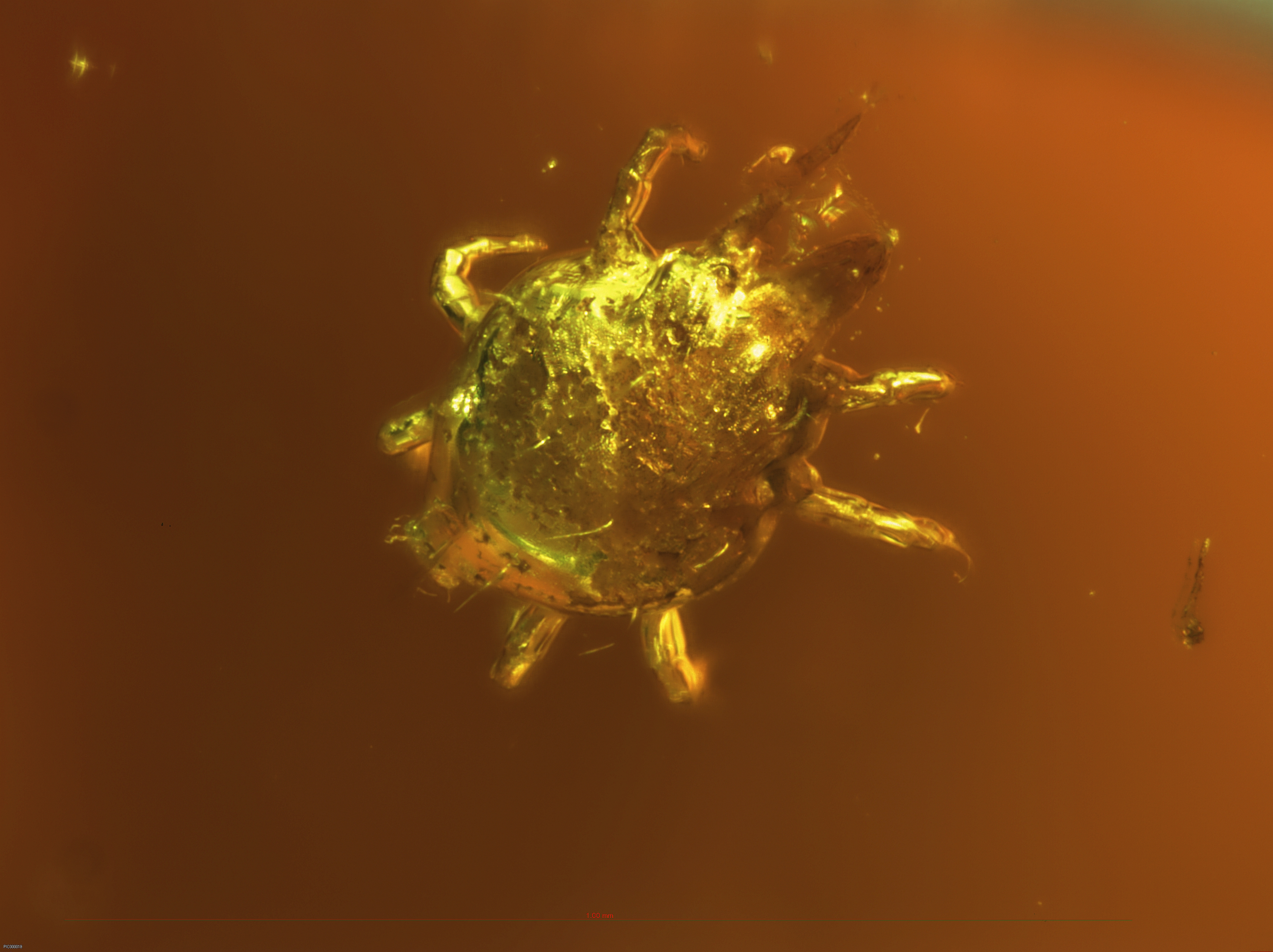
Mite, cf Glaesacarus rhombeus, fossilised in Baltic amber, Upper Eocene

The mite fossil record is sparse, due to their small size and low preservation potential. The oldest fossils of acariform mites are from the Rhynie Chert, Scotland, which dates to the early Devonian, around 410 million years ago while the earliest fossils of Parasitiformes are known from amber specimens dating to the mid-Cretaceous, around 100 million years ago. Most fossil acarids are no older than the Tertiary (up to 65 mya).

=== Phylogeny ===
Members of the superorders Opilioacariformes and Acariformes (sometimes known as Actinotrichida) are mites, as well as some of the Parasitiformes (sometimes known as Anactinotrichida). Recent genetic research has suggested that Acari is polyphyletic (of multiple origins).

Current understanding of probable chelicerate relationships, after Sharma and Gavish-Regev (2025):

- Chelicerata
  - Pycnogonida (sea spiders)
  - Prosomapoda
    - Opiliones (harvestmen)
    - - Palpigradi (microwhip scorpions)
      - - Solifugae (camel spiders)
        - Acariformes
    - Parasitiformes
    - - Xiphosura (horseshoe crabs)
      - Ricinulei
      - Arachnopulmonata
        - Panscorpiones
          - Pseudoscorpiones (pseudoscorpions)
          - Scorpiones (scorpions)
        - Tetrapulmonata
          - Araneae (spiders)
          - - Amblypygi (whip-spiders)
            - - Schizomida (shorttailed whipscorpions)
              - Uropygi (whip scorpions/vinegaroons)

However, a few phylogenomic studies have found strong support for monophyly of Acari and a sister relationship between Acariformes and Parasitiformes, although this finding has been questioned, with other studies suggesting that this likely represents a long branch attraction artefact as a result of inadequate sampling.

== Anatomy ==
=== External ===
Mites are tiny members of the class Arachnida; most are in the size range 250 to 750 μm (0.01 to 0.03 in) but some are larger and some are no bigger than 100 μm (0.004 in) as adults. The body plan has two regions, a cephalothorax (with no separate head) or prosoma, and an opisthosoma or abdomen. Segmentation has almost entirely been lost and the prosoma and opisthosoma are fused, only the positioning of the limbs indicating the location of the segments.

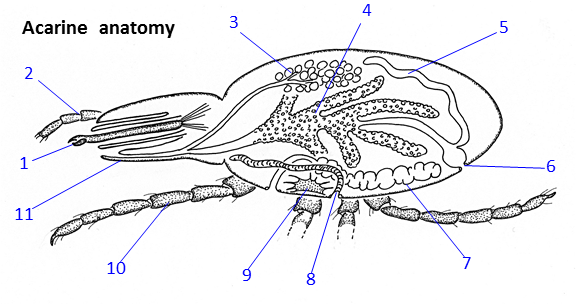
1 Chelicerae, 2 Palps, 3 Salivary glands, 4 Gut, 5 Excretory (Malpighian) tubules, 6 Anus, 7 Ovary or testes, 8 Air-breathing tubes (tracheae), 9 Central ganglion, 10 Legs, 11 Hypostome

At the front of the body is the gnathosoma or capitulum. This is not a head and does not contain the eyes or the brain, but is a retractable feeding apparatus consisting of the chelicerae, the pedipalps and the oral cavity. It is covered above by an extension of the body carapace and is connected to the body by a flexible section of cuticle. Two-segmented chelicerae is the ancestral condition in Acariformes, but in more derived groups they are single-segmented. And three-segmented chelicerae is the ancestral condition in Parasitiformes, but has been reduced to just two segments in more derived groups. The pedipalps differ between taxa depending on diet; in some species the appendages resemble legs while in others they are modified into chelicerae-like structures. The oral cavity connects posteriorly to the mouth and pharynx.

Most mites have four pairs of legs (two pairs in Eriophyoidea), each with six segments, which may be modified for swimming or other purposes. The dorsal surface of the body is clad in hardened tergites and the ventral surface by hardened sclerites; sometimes these form transverse ridges. The gonopore (genital opening) is located on the ventral surface between the fourth pair of legs. Some species have one to five median or lateral eyes but many species are blind, and slit and pit sense organs are common. Both body and limbs bear setae (bristles) which may be simple, flattened, club-shaped or sensory. Mites are usually some shade of brown, but some species are red, orange, black or green, or some combination of these colours.

Many mites have stigmata (openings used in respiration). In some mites, the stigmata are associated with peritremes: paired, tubular, elaborated extensions of the tracheal system. The higher taxa of mites are defined by these structures:

- Oribatida, formerly known as Cryptostigmata (crypto- = hidden), and Endeostigmata (endeo- = internal) lack primary stigmata and peritremes but may have secondary respiratory systems. For example, oribatids in the suborder Brachypylina have stigmata on the ventral plate of the body that are difficult to see (thus the former name Cryptostigmata).
- Astigmata (a- = without) lack stigmata and respire through their cuticle.
- Prostigmata (pro- = before/in front) have stigmata at the front of the body, usually on the lateral margins or between the chelicerae. These are associated with peritremes that may be on the prodorsum near the cheliceral bases, or be horn-like and emergent, or form a line or network on the dorsum of the gnathosomal capsule.
- Opilioacaridae have four pairs of dorsolateral stigmata that are added sequentially during development.
- The other three orders of Parasitiformes, Holothyrida, Ixodida, and Mesostigmata (meso- = middle), have just one pair of stigmata in the region of the fourth pair of legs. They also have peritremes: in Ixodida these consist of paired encircling plates around the stigmata, while the peritremes in Mesostigmata and Holothyrida are grooves extending from the stigmata anteriorly (sometimes also posteriorly).

=== Internal ===
Mite digestive systems have salivary glands that open into the preoral space rather than the foregut. Most species carry two to six pairs of salivary glands that empty at various points into the subcheliceral space. A few mite species lack an anus: they do not defecate during their short lives. The circulatory system consists of a network of sinuses and most mites lack a heart, with movement of fluid being driven by the contraction of body muscles. Ticks, and some of the larger species of mites, have a dorsal, longitudinal heart. Gas exchange is carried out across the body surface, but many species additionally have between one and four pairs of tracheae. The excretory system includes a nephridium and one or two pairs of Malpighian tubules. Several families of mites, such as Tetranychidae, Eriophyidae, Camerobiidae, Cunaxidae, Trombidiidae, Trombiculidae, Erythraeidae and Bdellidae have silk glands used to produce silk for various purposes. Additionally, water mites (Hydrachnidia) produce long thin threads that may be silk.

== Reproduction and life cycle ==
Harvest mite (Trombiculidae) life cycle: the larvae and nymphs resemble small adults, though the larvae have only six legs.

The sexes are separate in mites; males have a pair of testes in the mid-region of the body, each connected to the gonopore by a vas deferens, and in some species there is a chitinous penis; females have a single ovary connected to the gonopore by an oviduct, as well as a seminal receptacle for the storage of sperm. In most mites, sperm is transferred to the female indirectly; the male either deposits a spermatophore on a surface from which it is picked up by the female, or he uses his chelicerae or third pair of legs to insert it into the female's gonopore. In some of the Acariformes, insemination is direct using the male's penis. The spermatophora in all mites are aflagellate.

The eggs are laid in the substrate, or wherever the mite happens to live. They take up to six weeks to hatch, according to species, then may pass through up to six instars: prelarva, larva, protonymph, deutonymph, tritonymph, and adult. These developmental stages may look different or may be omitted depending on the mite group. All mites have an adult stage. Longevity varies between species, but the lifespan of mites is short compared to many other arachnids.

== Ecology ==
=== Niches ===
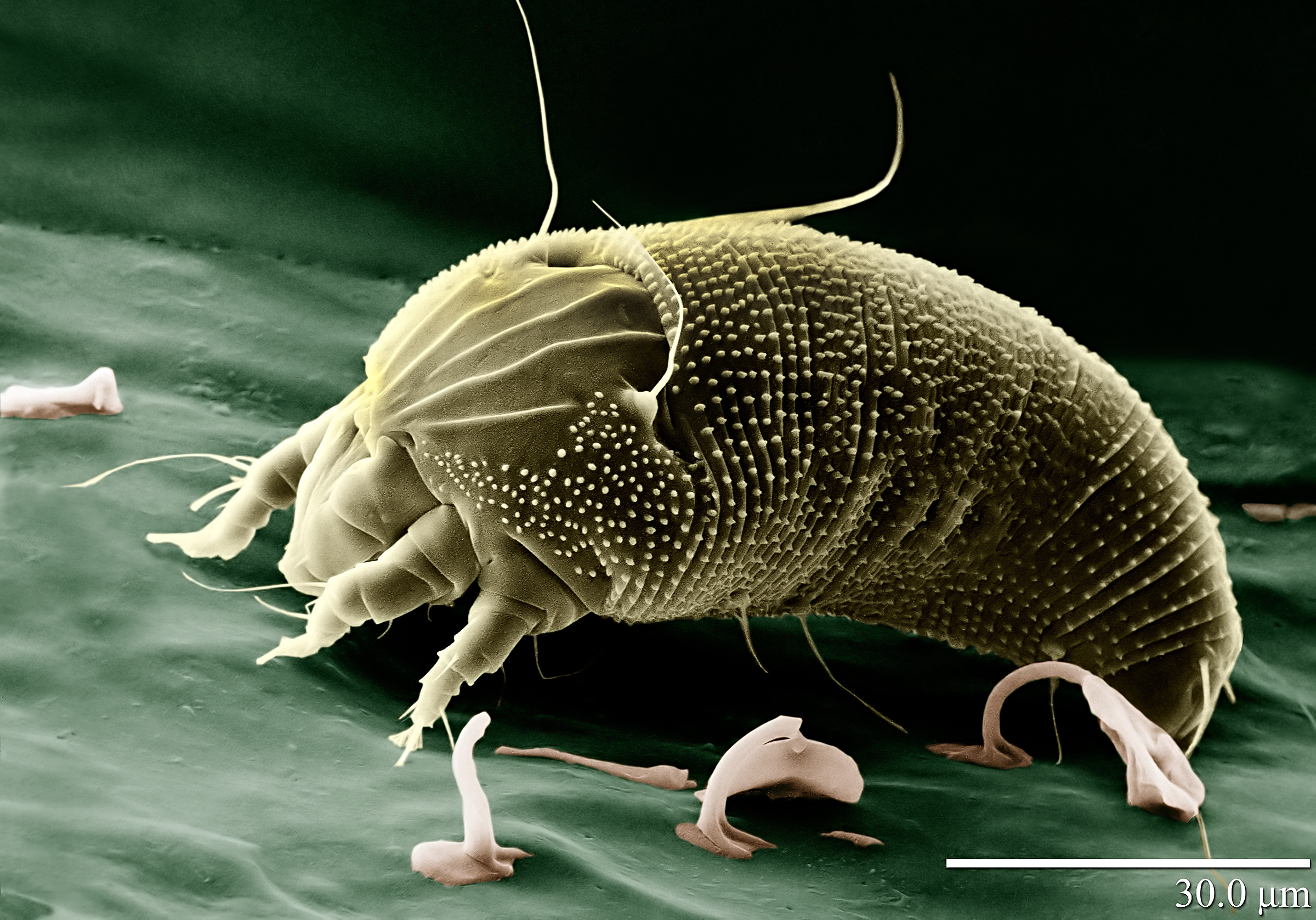
Russet mite, A. anthocoptes, is found on the invasive weed Cirsium arvense, the Canada thistle, across the world. It may be usable as a biological pest control agent for this weed.

Mites occupy a wide range of ecological niches. For example, Oribatida mites are important decomposers in many habitats. They eat a wide variety of material including living and dead plant and fungal material, lichens and carrion; some are predatory, though no oribatid mites are parasitic. Mites are among the most diverse and successful of all invertebrate groups. They have exploited a wide array of habitats, and because of their small size go largely unnoticed. They are found in freshwater (e.g. the water mites or Hydrachnidia) and saltwater (most Halacaridae), in the soil, in forests, pastures, agricultural crops, ornamental plants, thermal springs and caves. They inhabit organic debris of all kinds and are extremely numerous in leaf litter. They feed on animals, plants and fungi and some are parasites of plants and animals. Some 48,200 species of mites have been described, but there may be a million or more species as yet undescribed. The tropical species Archegozetes longisetosus is one of the strongest animals in the world, relative to its mass (100 μg): It lifts up to 1,182 times its own weight, over five times more than would be expected of such a minute animal. A mite also holds a speed record: for its length, Paratarsotomus macropalpis is the fastest animal on Earth.

The mites living in soil consist of a range of taxa. Oribatida and Prostigmata are more numerous in soil than Mesostigmata, and have more soil-dwelling species. When soil is affected by an ecological disturbance such as agriculture, most mites (Astigmata, Mesostigmata and Prostigmata) recolonise it within a few months, whereas Oribatida take multiple years.

=== Parasitism ===
Many mites are parasitic on plants and animals. One family of mites, Pyroglyphidae, or nest mites, live primarily in the nests of birds and other animals. These mites are largely parasitic and consume blood, skin and keratin. Dust mites, which feed mostly on dead skin and hair shed from humans instead of consuming them from the organism directly, evolved from these parasitic ancestors. Ticks are a prominent group of mites that are parasitic on vertebrates, mostly mammal and birds, feeding on blood with specialised mouthparts.

Parasitic mites sometimes infest insects. Varroa destructor attaches to the body of honey bees, and Acarapis woodi (family Tarsonemidae) lives in their tracheae. Hundreds of species are associated with other bees, mostly poorly described. They attach to bees in a variety of ways. For example, Trigona corvina workers have been found with mites attached to the outer face of their hind tibiae. Some are thought to be parasites, while others are beneficial symbionts. Mites also parasitize some ant species, such as Eciton burchellii. Most larvae of Parasitengona are ectoparasites of arthropods, while later life stages in this group tend to shift to being predators.

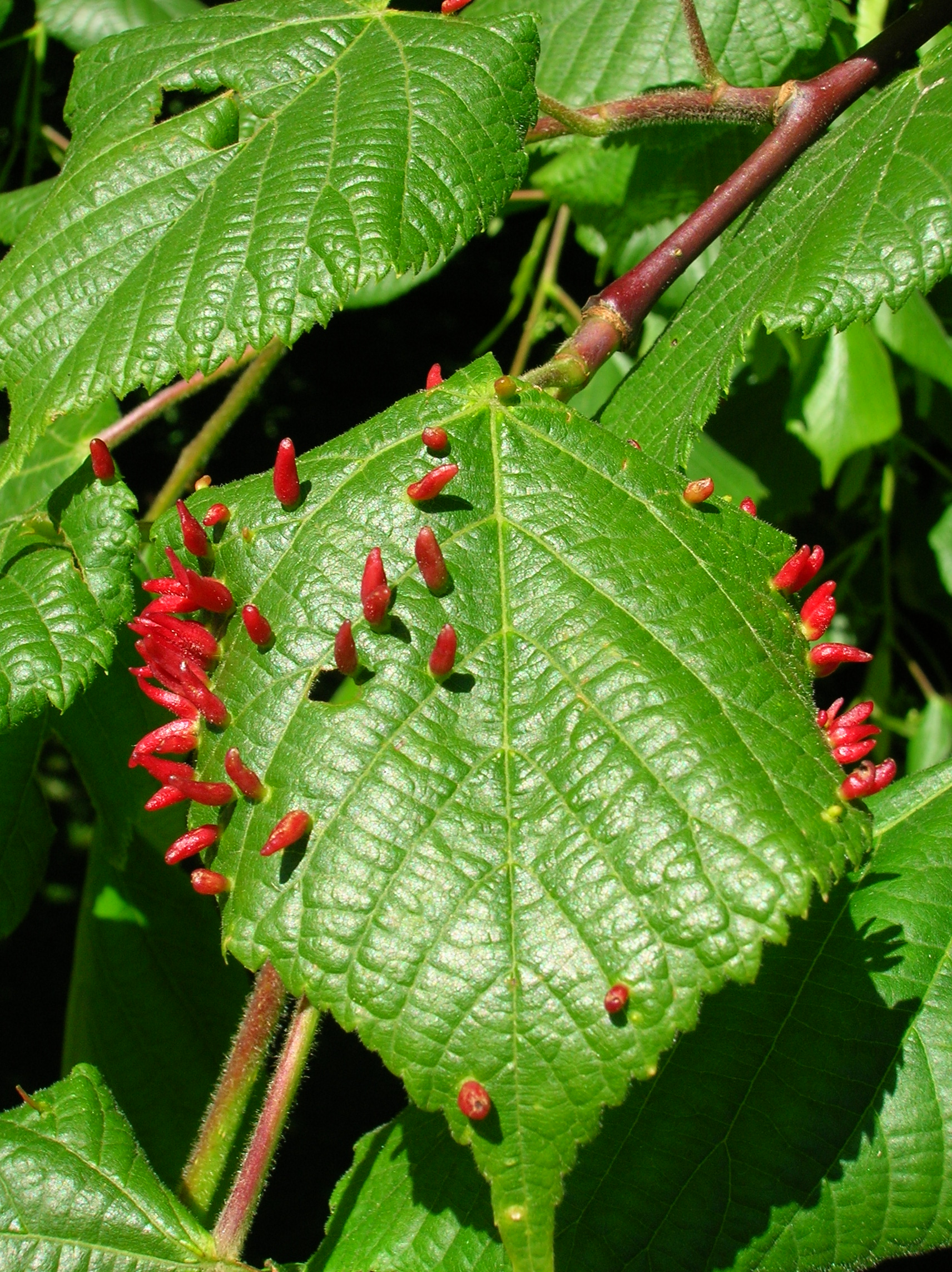
Lime nail galls on Tilia × europaea, caused by the mite Eriophyes tiliae

Plant pests include the so-called spider mites (family Tetranychidae), thread-footed mites (family Tarsonemidae), and the gall mites (family Eriophyidae). Among the species that attack animals are members of the sarcoptic mange mites (family Sarcoptidae), which burrow under the skin. Demodex mites (family Demodecidae) are parasites that live in or near the hair follicles of mammals, including humans.

=== Dispersal ===
Being unable to fly, mites need some other means of dispersal. On a small scale, walking is used to access other suitable locations in the immediate vicinity. Some species mount to a high point and adopt a dispersal posture and get carried away by the wind, while others waft a thread of silk aloft to balloon to a new position.

Parasitic mites use their hosts to disperse, and spread from host to host by direct contact. Another strategy is phoresy; the mite, often equipped with suitable claspers or suckers, grips onto an insect or other animal, and gets transported to another place. A phoretic mite is just a hitch-hiker and does not feed during the time it is carried by its temporary host. These travelling mites are mostly species that reproduce rapidly and are quick to colonise new habitats.

== Relationship with humans ==
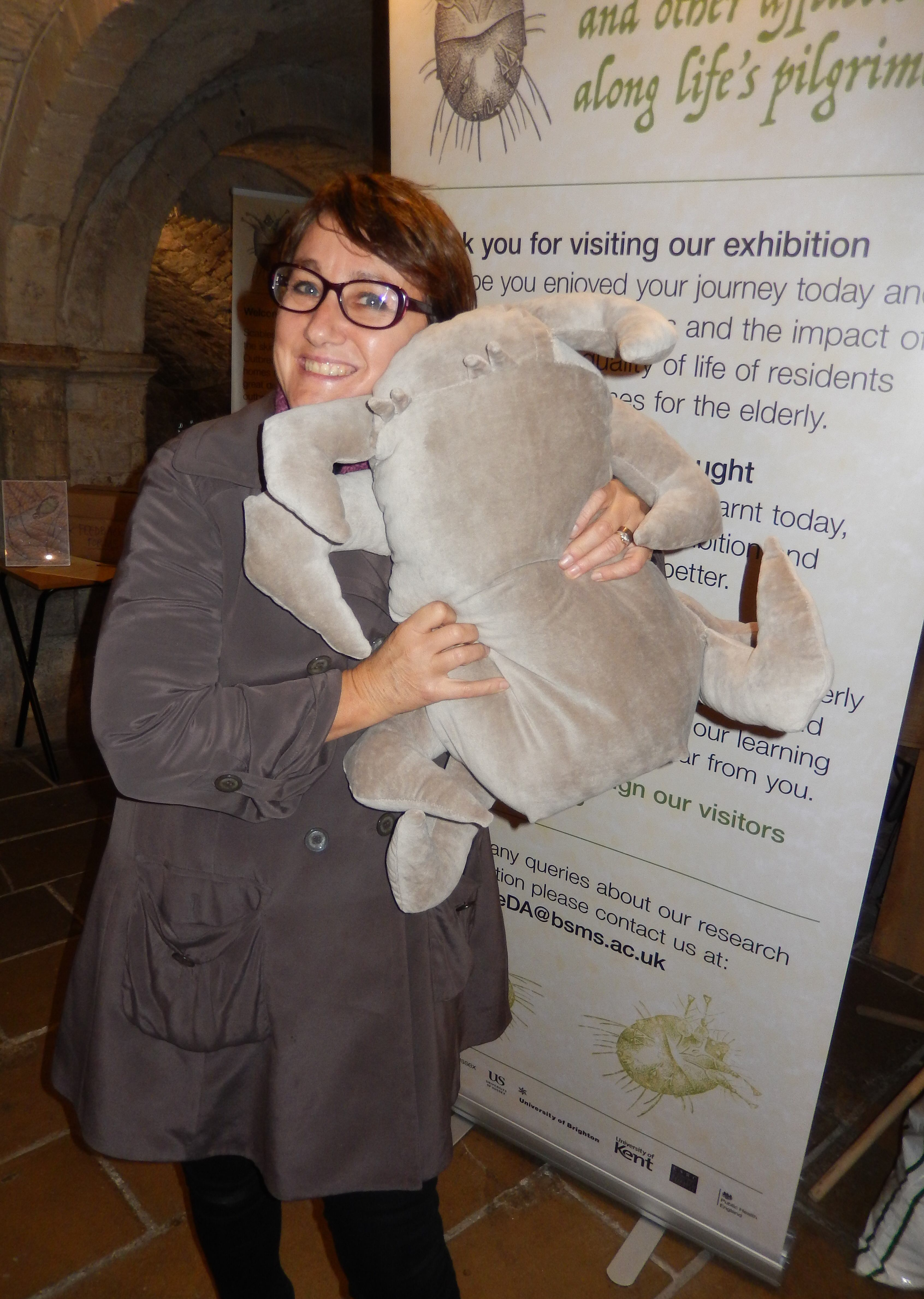
Public health worker Stefania Lanzia using a large stuffed toy scabies mite to publicise scabies, an often overlooked condition especially among the elderly

Mites are tiny, and apart from those that are of economic concern to humans, little studied. The majority are beneficial, living in the soil or aqueous environments and assisting in the decomposition of decaying organic material, as part of the carbon cycle.

Two species live on humans, namely Demodex folliculorum and Demodex brevis; both are frequently referred to as eyelash mites.

=== Medical significance ===
The majority of mite species are harmless to humans and domestic animals, but a few species can colonize mammals directly, acting as vectors for disease transmission, and causing or contributing to allergenic diseases. Mites which colonize human skin are the cause of several types of itchy skin rashes, such as gamasoidosis, rodent mite dermatitis, grain itch, grocer's itch, and scabies. Sarcoptes scabiei is a parasitic mite responsible for scabies, which is one of the three most common skin disorders in children; outbreaks are common in institutions such as care homes for elderly people, hospitals, schools, prisons, and refugee camps. Demodex mites, a common cause of mange in dogs and other domesticated animals, have also been implicated in the human skin disease rosacea; although the mechanism by which demodex contributes to the disease is unclear. Ticks are well known for carrying diseases, such as Lyme disease and Rocky Mountain spotted fever.

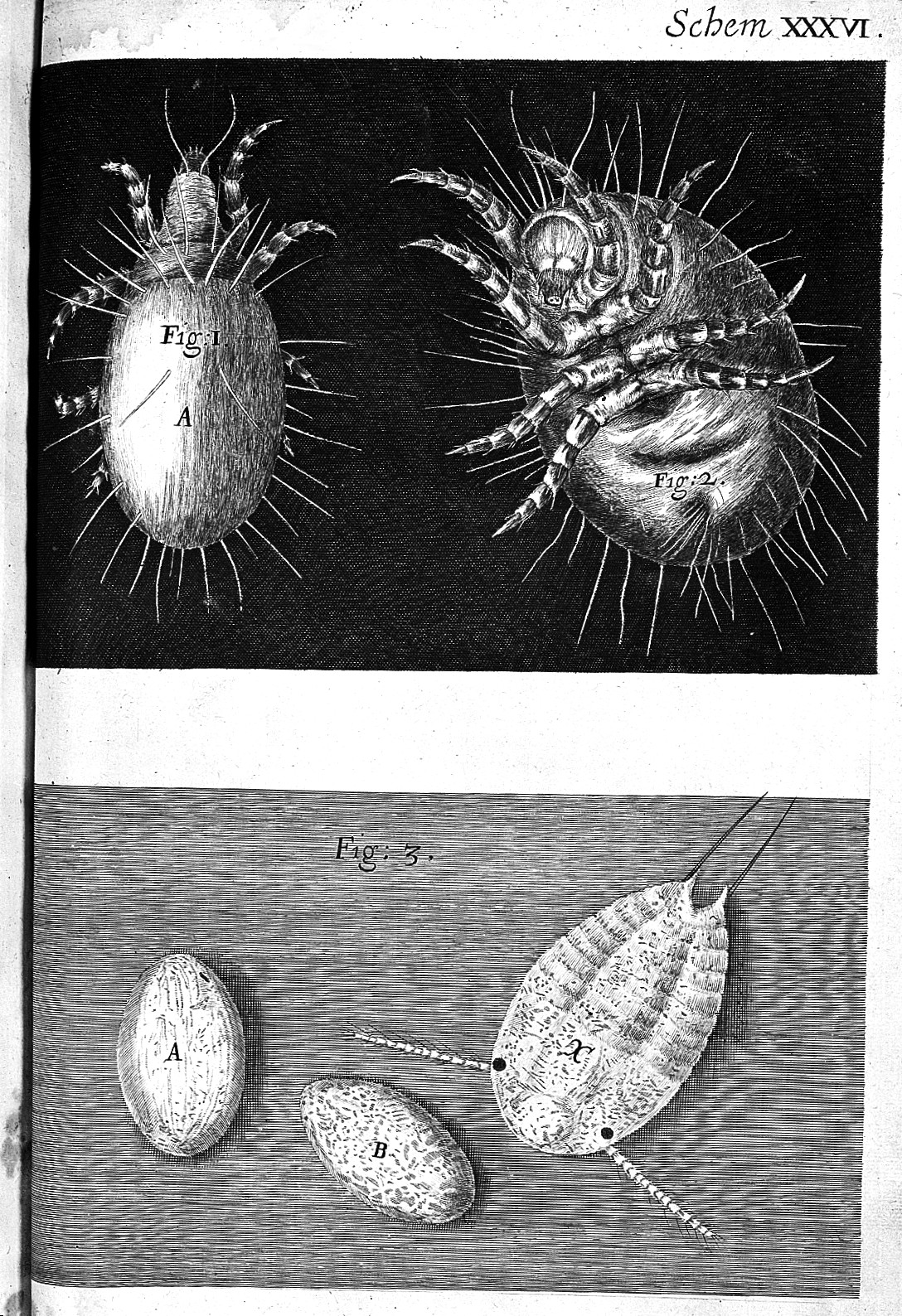
Mites and their eggs, drawn by Robert Hooke, Micrographia, 1665

Chiggers are known primarily for their itchy bite, but they can also spread disease in some limited circumstances, such as scrub typhus. The house-mouse mite is the only known vector of the disease rickettsialpox. House dust mites, found in warm and humid places such as beds, cause several forms of allergic diseases, including hay fever, asthma and eczema, and are known to aggravate atopic dermatitis.

Among domestic animals, sheep are affected by the mite Psoroptes ovis which lives on the skin, causing hypersensitivity and inflammation. Hay mites are a suspected reservoir for scrapie, a prion disease of sheep.

=== In beekeeping ===
The mite Varroa destructor is a serious pest of honey bees, contributing to colony collapse disorder in commercial hives. This organism is an obligate external parasite, able to reproduce only in bee colonies. It directly weakens its host by sucking up the bee's fat, and can spread RNA viruses including deformed wing virus. Heavy infestation causes the death of a colony, generally over the winter. Since 2006, more than 10 million beehives have been lost.

=== Biological pest control ===
Various mites prey on other invertebrates and can be used to control their populations. Phytoseiidae, especially members of Amblyseius, Metaseiulus, and Phytoseiulus, are used to control pests such as spider mites. Among the Laelapidae, Gaeolaelaps aculeifer and Stratiolaelaps scimitus are used to control fungus gnats, poultry red mites and various soil pests.

=== In culture ===
Mites were first observed under the microscope by the English polymath Robert Hooke. In his 1665 book Micrographia, he stated that far from being spontaneously generated from dirt, they were "very prettily shap'd Insects". In 1898, Arthur Conan Doyle wrote a satirical poem, "A Parable", with the conceit of some cheese mites disputing the origin of the round cheddar cheese in which they all lived. The world's first science documentary featured cheese mites, seen under the microscope; the short film was shown in London's Alhambra music hall in 1903, causing a boom in the sales of simple microscopes.

== See also ==
- Chigger bite
- Copra itch
- Gamasoidosis
- Grain itch
- Grocer's itch
- List of mites associated with cutaneous reactions
