= List of arachnids of Ireland =

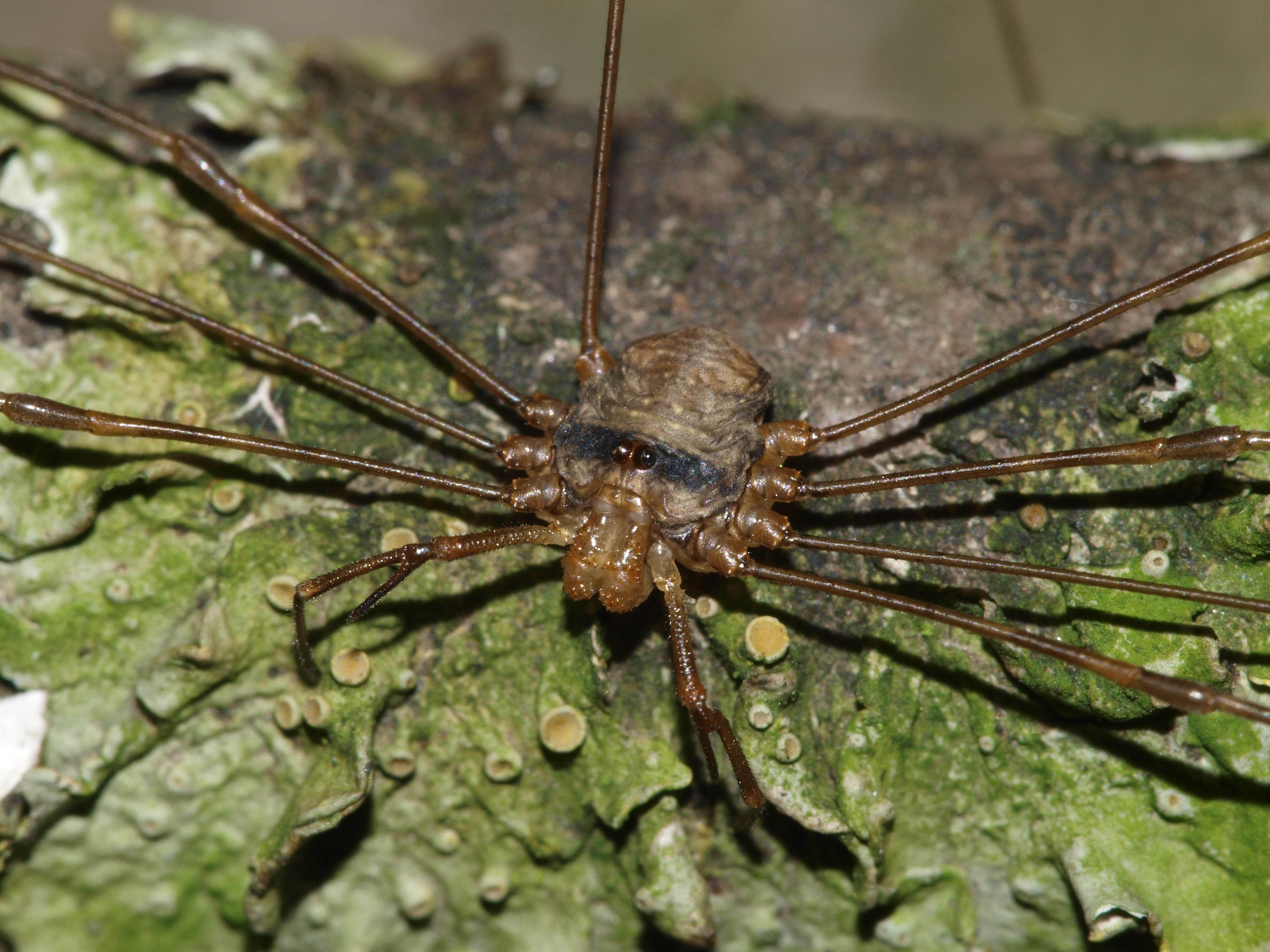
Dicranopalpus ramosus, a harvestman found in southern coastal parts of Ireland.

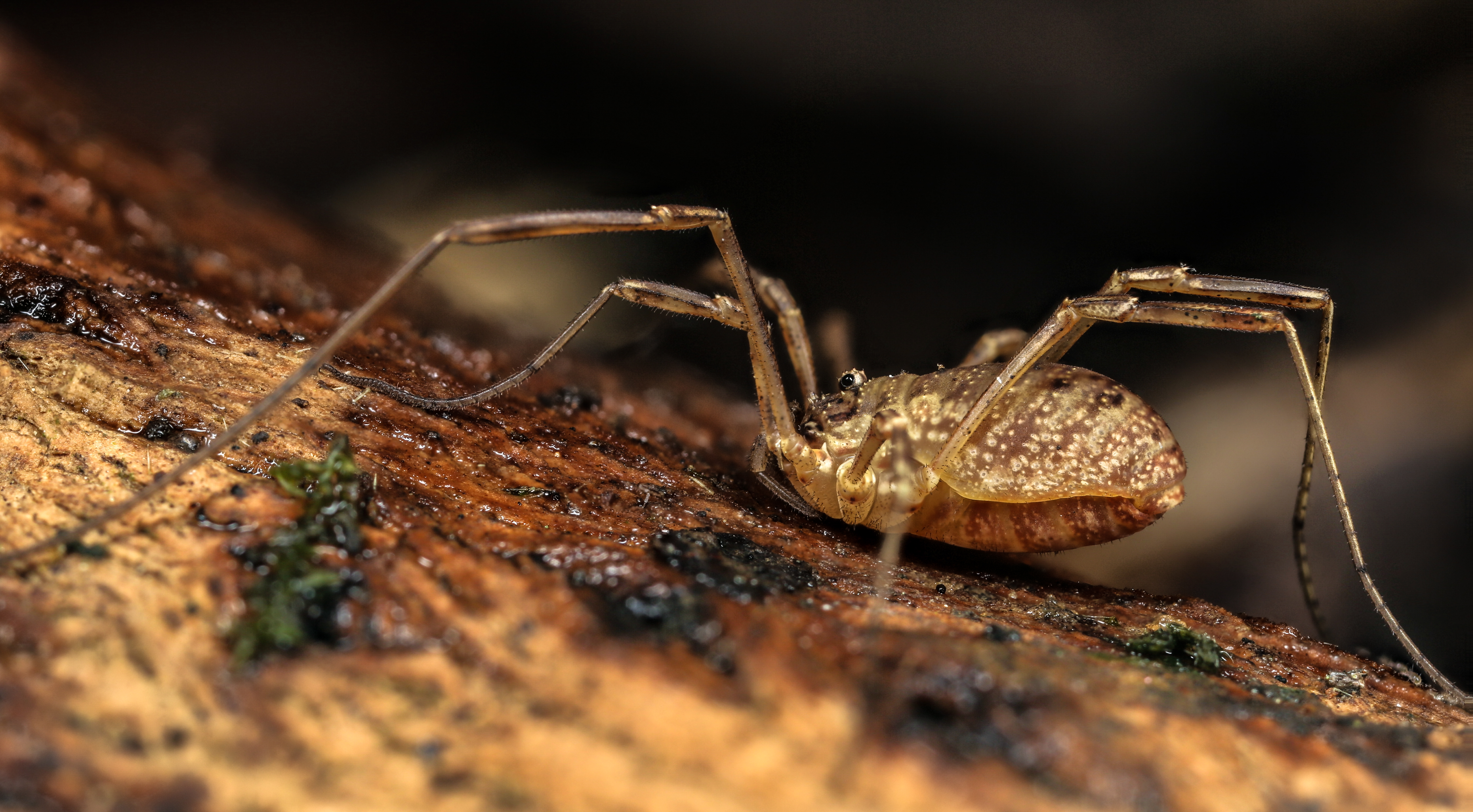
Oligolophus tridens, a harvestman found all over Ireland.

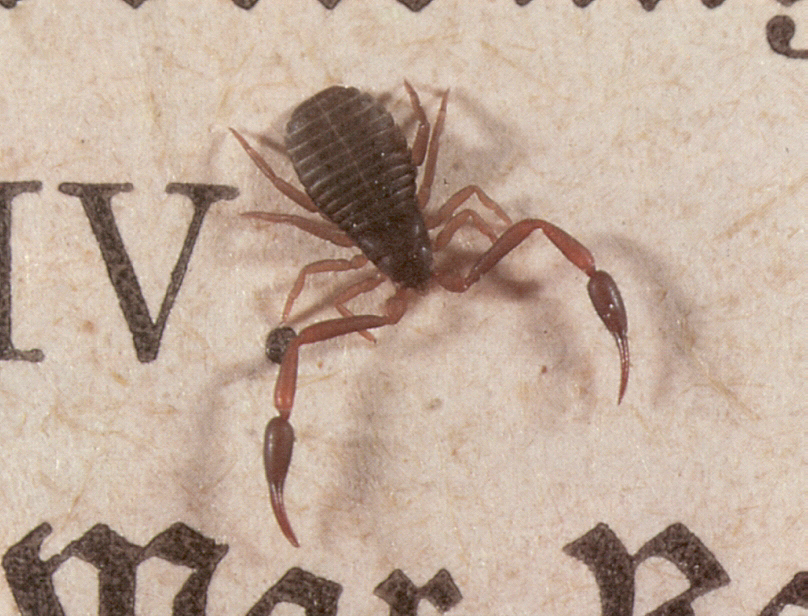
Chelifer cancroides, a pseudoscorpion found in Ireland. The abdomen is short and rounded at the rear, rather than extending into a segmented tail and stinger like a true scorpion, of which there are none in Ireland.

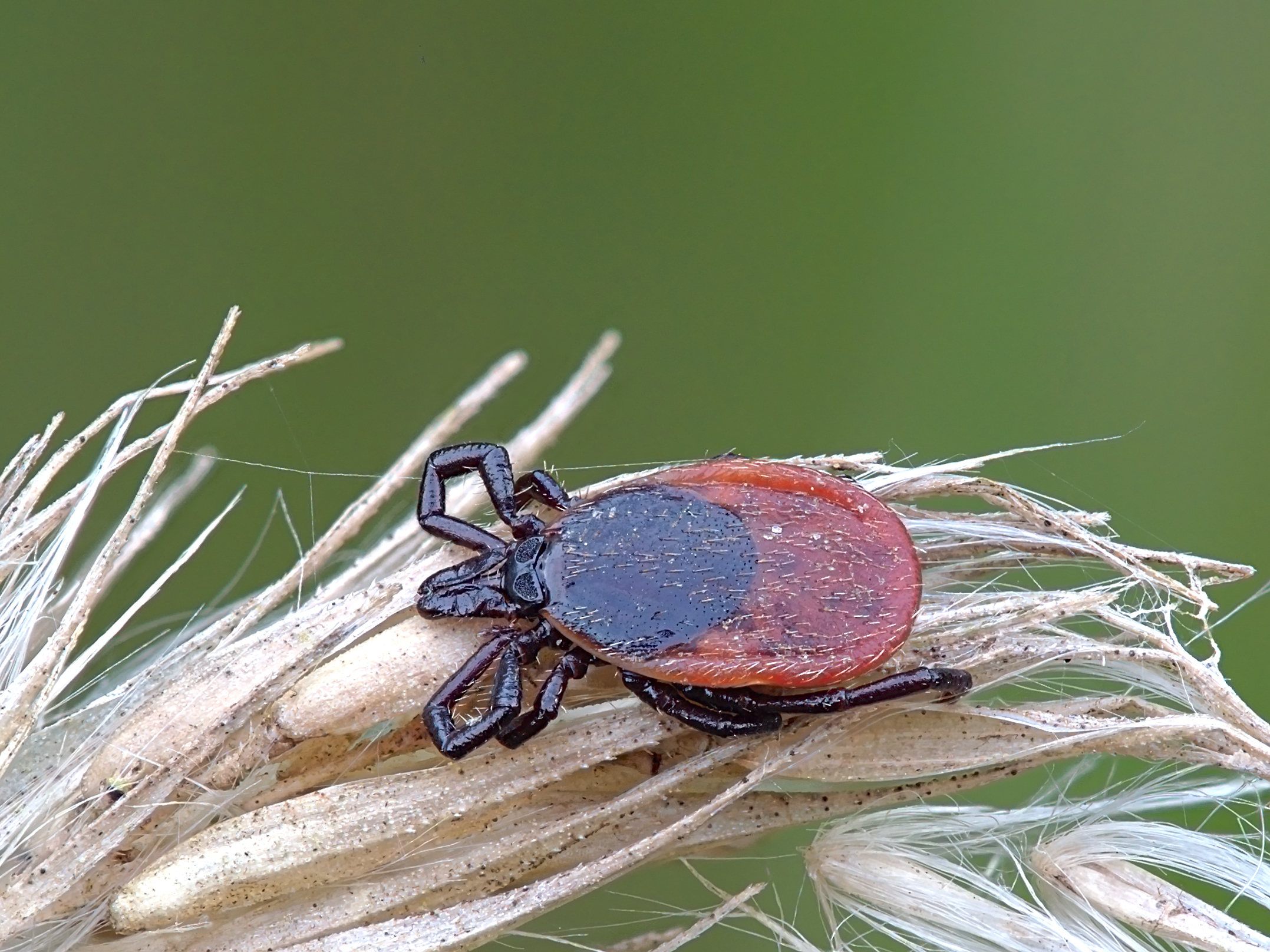
Ixodes ricinus, the castor bean tick, which spreads the pathogens that cause Lyme disease and tick-borne encephalitis.

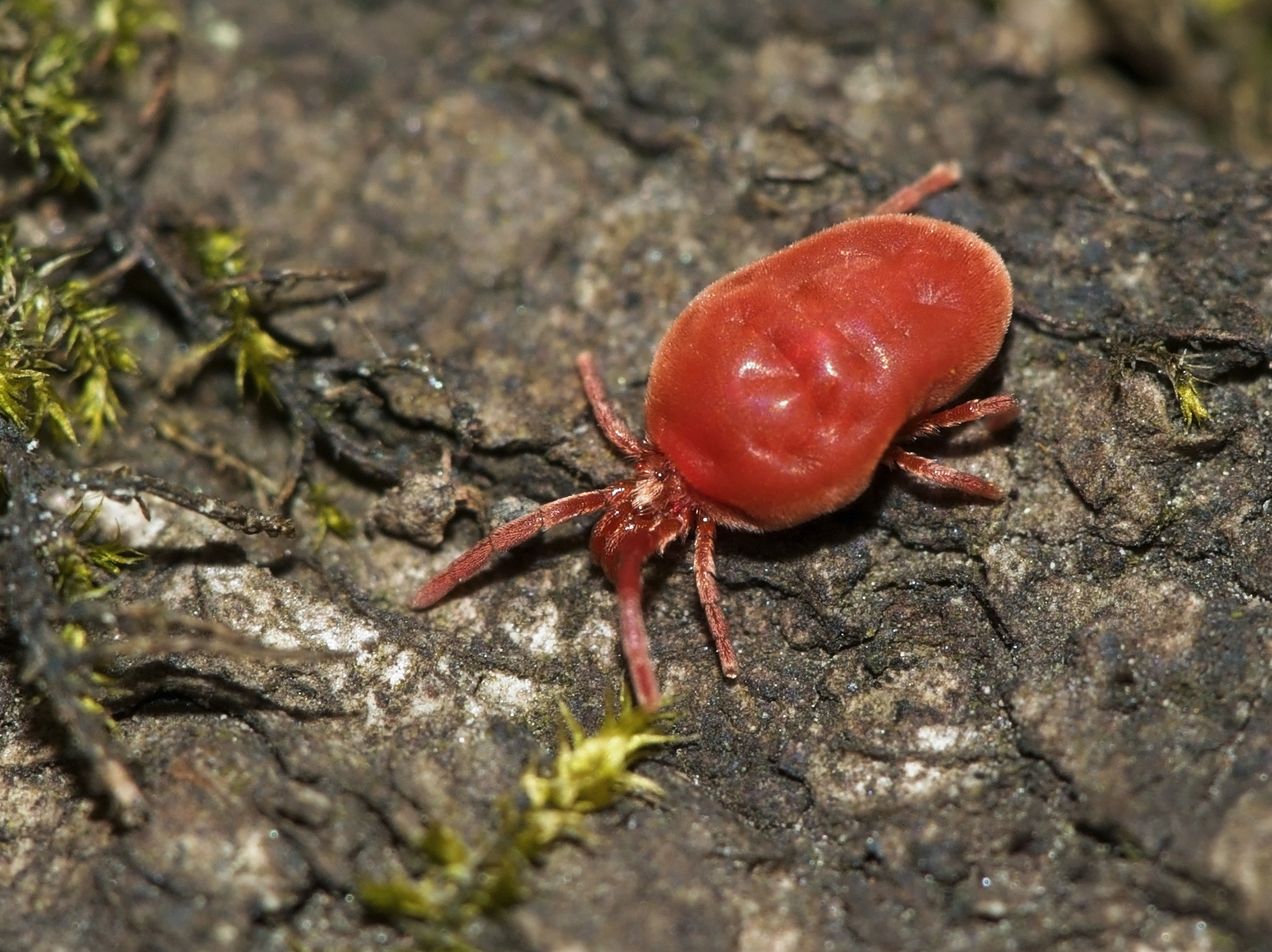
Trombidium holosericeum, a red velvet mite that lives in soil and feeds on insects.

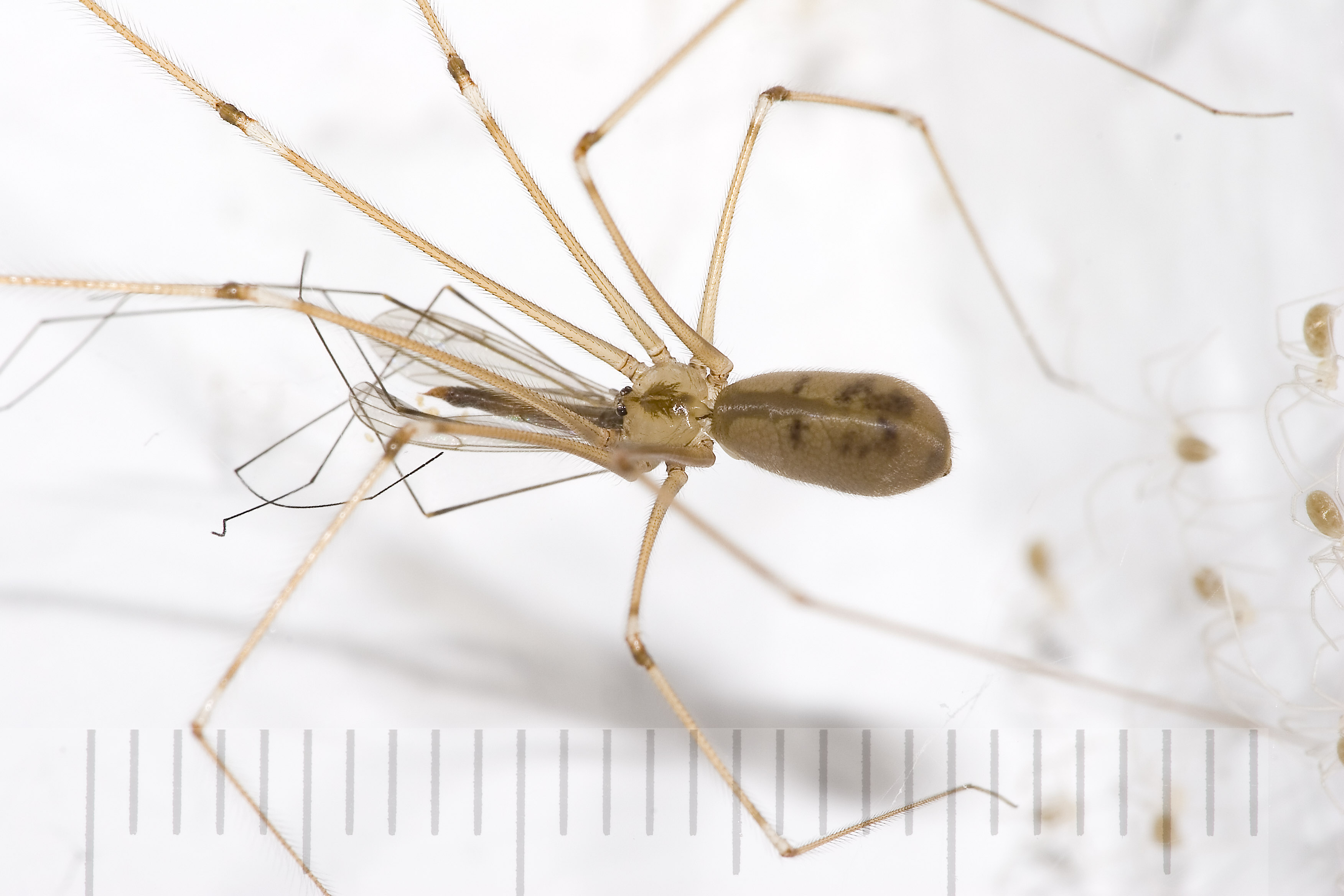
Pholcus phalangioides, the skull spider, found in County Kerry.

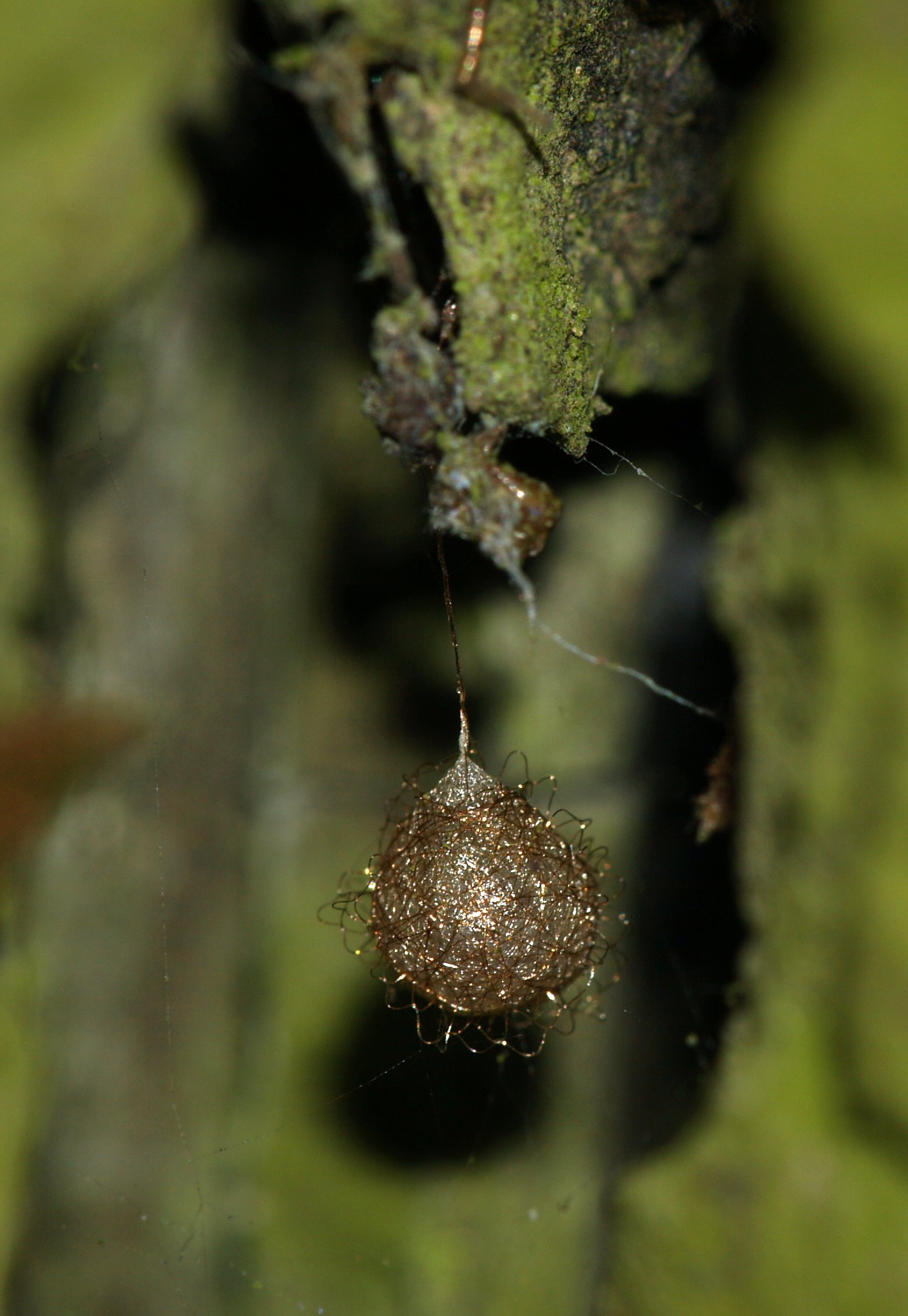
Egg sac of Ero furcata, a pirate spider found in coastal parts of Ireland.

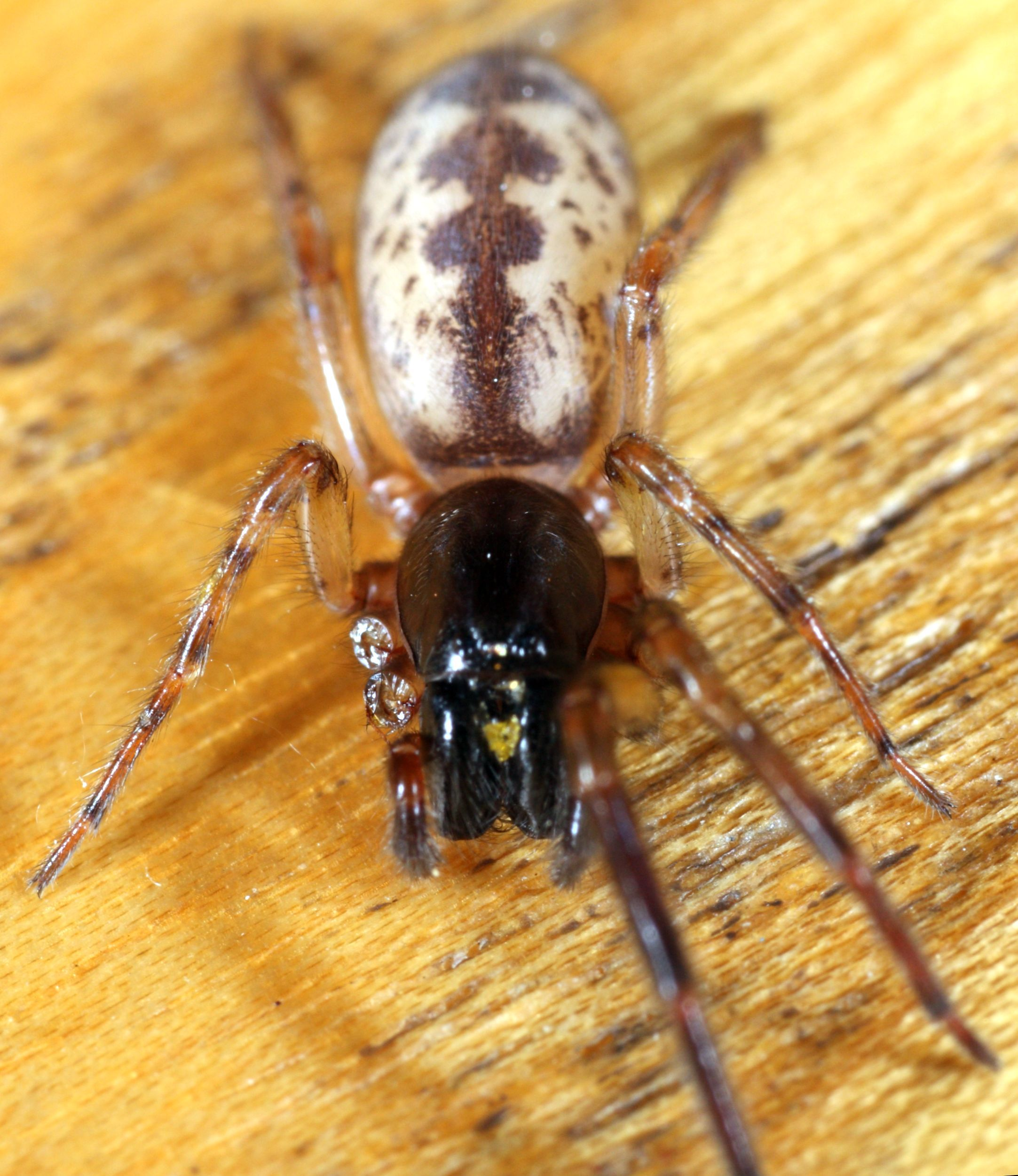
Female snake-back spider (Segestria senoculata).

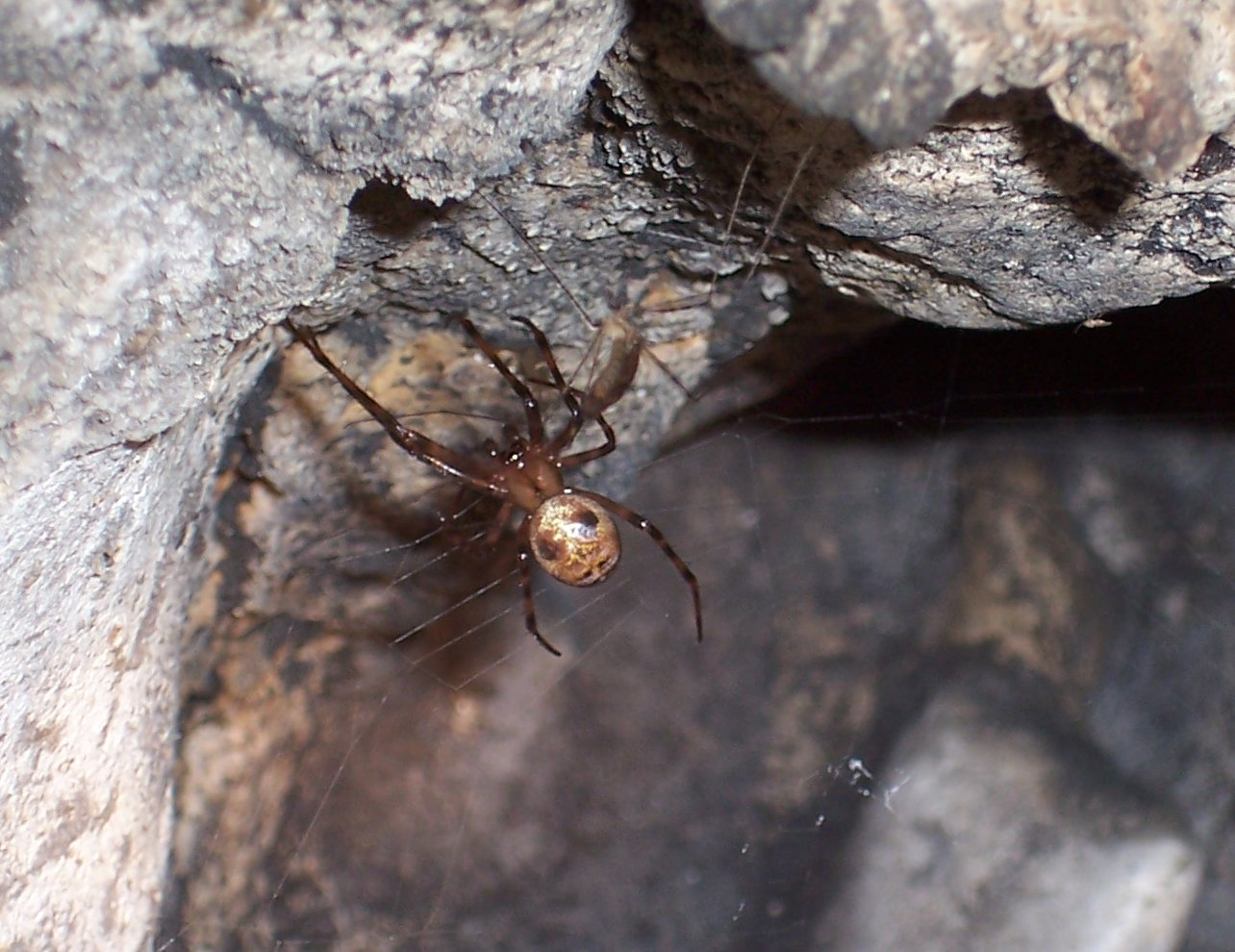
European cave spider (Meta menardi), recorded in Kerry.

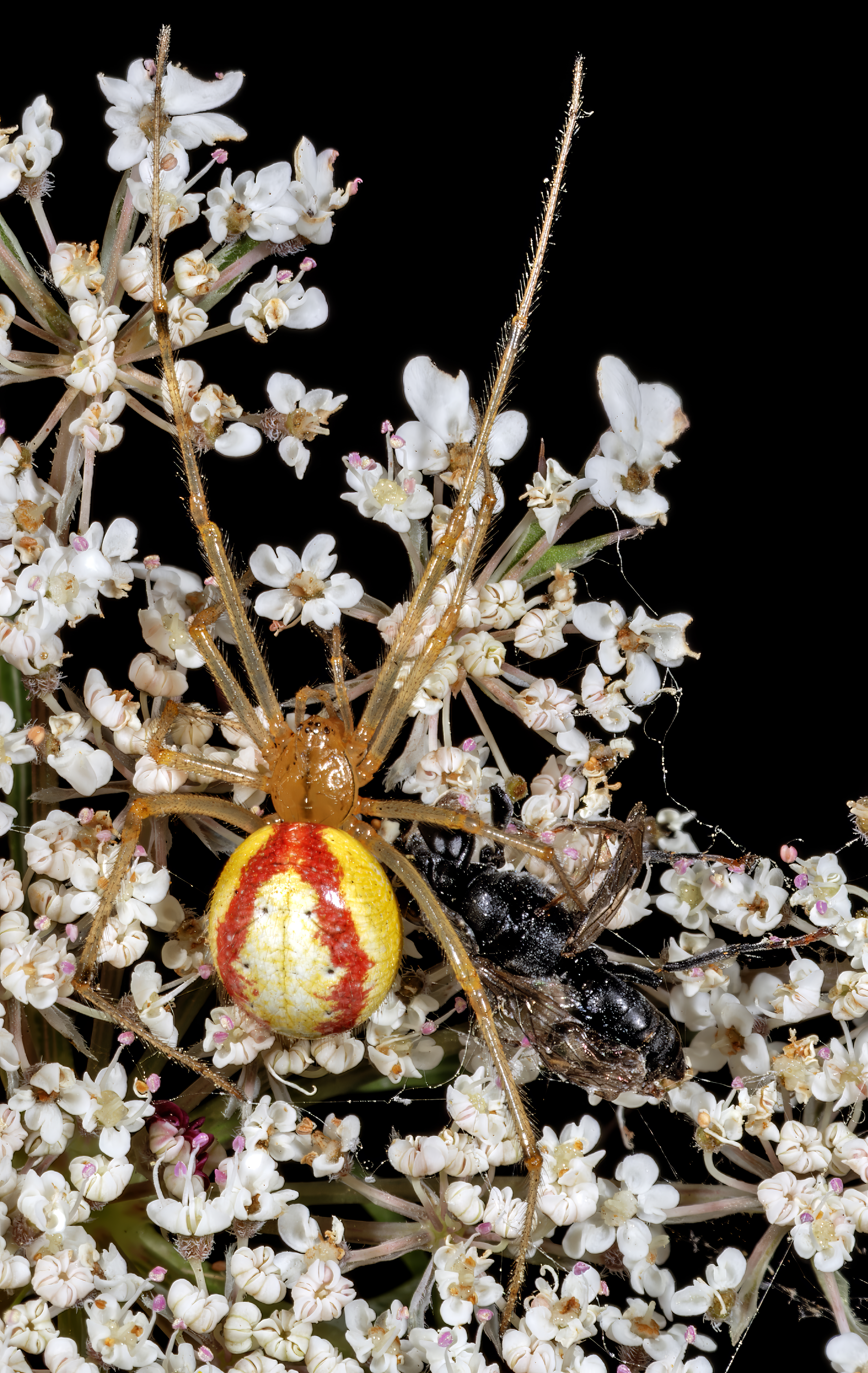
A female Enoplognatha ovata on a Daucus carota; this spider is found in coastal parts of Ireland, especially in the southeast.

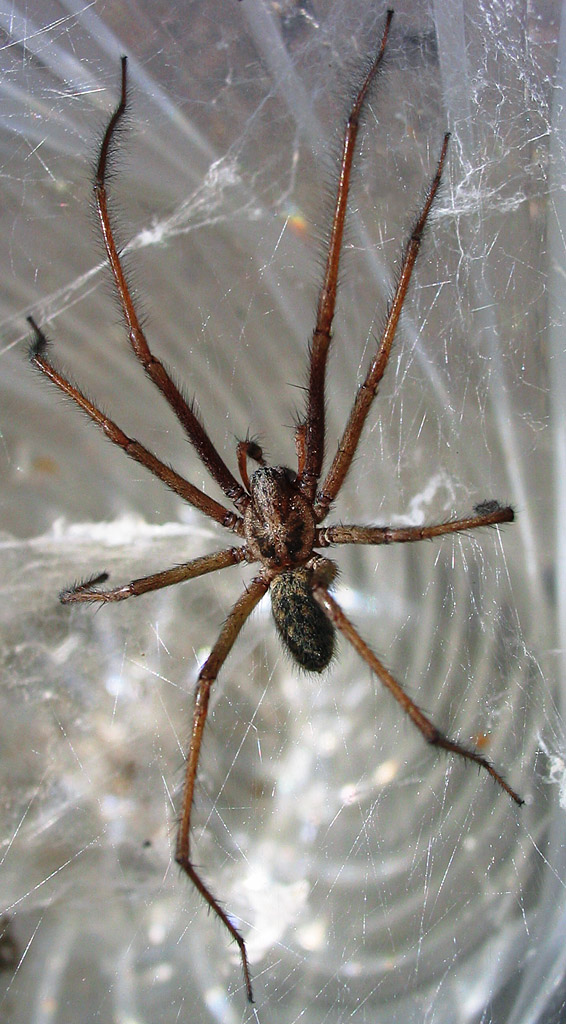
Giant house spider (Eratigena atrica), common in the Midlands.

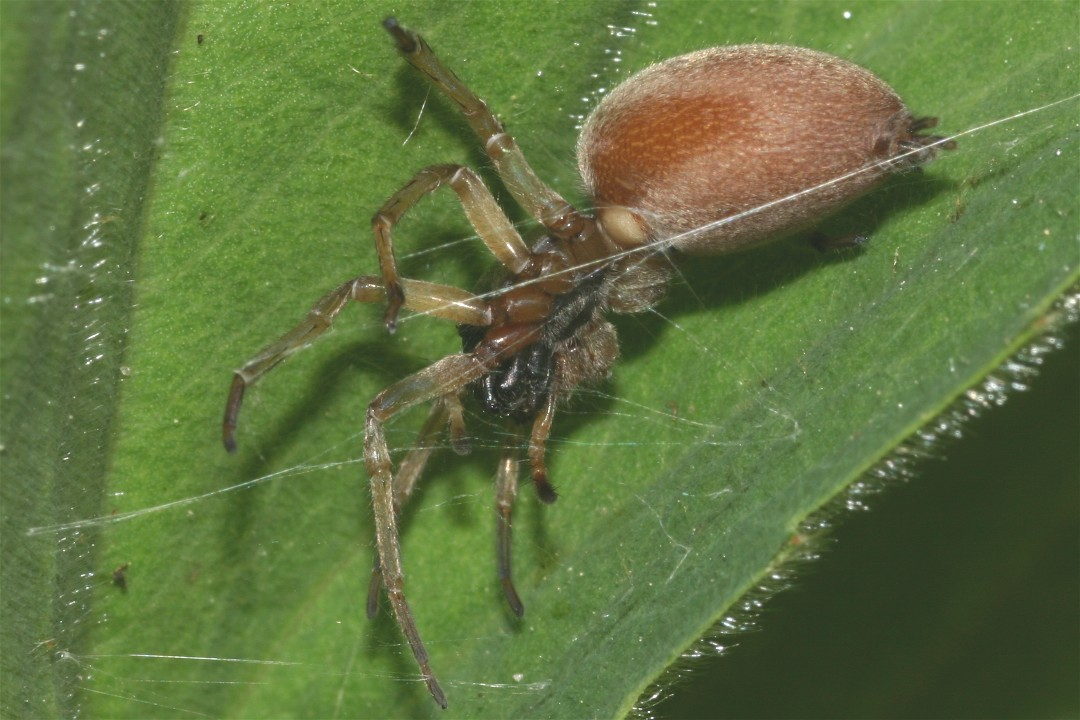
Clubiona trivialis, a sac spider very common in the Midlands.

There are approximately 1,107 species of arachnid native to Ireland. This page lists them, but is not up to date for all taxa.

Arachnids are eight-legged chelicerate arthropods with pedipalps and bodies divided into two tagmata.

The most best known and familiar group in Ireland is the spiders, and there are also several species of harvestman (daddy-long-legs), ticks, mites and pseudoscorpions. Arachnid groups absent from Ireland include true scorpions, whip scorpions, solifuges, cave spiders, microwhip scorpions, hooded tick spiders and tarantulas.

== Subclass Dromopoda ==
=== Order Opiliones (harvestmen / daddy-long-legs) ===
15 native species and three species which are not considered to be native: Odiella spinosus, Opilio parietinus (Phalangiidae) and Dicranopalpus ramosus (Leiobunidae)

==== Family Nemastomatidae ====
- Mitostoma chrysomelas
- Nemastoma lugubre bimaculatum

==== Family Phalangiidae ====
- Dicranopalpus ramosus
- Lacinius ephippiatus
- Megabunus diadema
- Mitopus morio
- Oligolophus hanseni
- Oligolophus tridens
- Opilio parietinus
- Opilio saxatilis
- Paroligolophus agrestis
- Phalangium opilio
- Rilaena triangularis (Paraplatybunus triangularis)

==== Family Sclerosomatidae ====
- Leiobunum blackwalli
- Leiobunum rotundum
- Nelima gothica

==== Family Trogulidae ====
- Anelasmocephalus cambridgei

=== Order Pseudoscorpionida (false scorpions) ===
17 species

==== Family Cheiridiidae ====
- Cheiridium museorum

==== Family Cheliferidae ====
- House pseudoscorpion (Chelifer cancroides)

==== Family Chernetidae ====
- Allochernes powelli
- Dinocheirus panzeri
- Lamprochernes nodosus
- Lamprochernes savignyi
- Pselaphochernes dubius
- Pselaphochernes scorpioides

==== Family Chthonidae ====
- Kewochthonius halberti

==== Family Chthoniidae ====
- Chthonius ischnochele
- Chthonius orthodactylus
- Chthonius tetrachelatus

==== Family Neobisiidae ====
- Neobisium carcinoides
- Neobisium carpenteri
- Neobisium maritimum
- Roncocreagris cambridgei
- Roncus lubricus

== Subclass Acari (ticks and mites) ==
At least 684 species

=== Order Ixodida (ticks) ===
==== Family Ixodidae ====
10 species

- Dermacentor reticulatus
- Castor bean tick (Ixodes ricinus)

==== Family Argasidae (soft ticks) ====
2 species

=== Order Prostigmata (sucking true mites) ===
249 species

==== Family Alycidae ====
4 species

==== Family Arrenuridae ====
5 species

==== Family Bdellidae ====
5 species

==== Family Ereynetidae ====
1 species

==== Family Eriophyidae (gall mites) ====
52 species

- Aceria cephalonea
- Sycamore felt gall mite (Aceria pseudoplatani)
- Eriophyes exilis
- Eriophyes laevis
- Eriophyes macrorhynchus subsp. aceribus
- Eriophyes prunispinosae
- Eriophyes pyri
- Eriophyes similis
- Phyllocoptes goniothorax
- Phyllocoptes malinus
- Big bud gall mite (Phytoptus avellanae)

==== Family Erythraeidae ====
7 species

==== Family Eupodidae ====
2 species

==== Family Eylaidae ====
3 species

==== Family Halacaridae (marine mites) ====
44 species

- Thalassarachna capuzina

==== Family Hydrodromidae ====
1 species

- Yellow foot mite (Hydrodroma despiciens)

==== Hydrachnidiae ====
2 species

==== Family Hydryphantidae ====
2 species

==== Family Hygrobatidae ====
6 species

==== Family Lebertiidae ====
11 species

==== Family Limnesiidae ====
2 species

==== Family Meyerellidae ====
3 species

==== Family Microtrombidiidae ====
4 species

==== Family Mideidae ====
1 species

==== Family Mideopsidae ====
1 species

==== Family Nanorchestidae ====
2 species

==== Family Oxidae ====
1 species

==== Family Penthaleidae ====
2 species

==== Family Phytoptidae ====
2 species

==== Family Pionidae ====
14 species

==== Family Podothrombiidae ====
1 species

==== Family Rhagidiidae ====
4 species

==== Family Scutacaridae ====
1 species

==== Family Sperchontidae ====
7 species

==== Family Stigmaeidae ====
3 species

==== Family Tanaupodidae ====
1 species

==== Family Tarsonemidae ====
14 species

==== Family Tetranychidae ====
6 species

==== Family Teutoniidae ====
1 species

==== Family Torrenticolidae ====
9 species

==== Family Trombiculidae ====
1 species

==== Family Tydeidae ====
15 species

==== Family Unionicolidae ====
6 species

=== Suborder Oribatida (moss mites / beetle mites) ===
173 species have been identified for the Republic of Ireland

==== Family Achipteriidae ====
4 species

==== Family Adelphacaridae ====
1 species

==== Family Ameronothridae ====
7 species

==== Family Banksinomidae ====
1 species

==== Family Belbidae ====
1 species

==== Family Brachychthoniidae ====
19 species

==== Family Caleremaeidae ====
1 species

==== Family Camisiidae ====
6 species

==== Family Cepheidae ====
3 species

==== Family Cosmochthoniidae ====
1 species

==== Family Euphthiracaridae ====
1species

==== Family Euzetidae ====
2 species

==== Family Hermanniidae ====
7 species

==== Family Hypochthoniidae ====
2 species

==== Family Liodidae ====
1 species

==== Family Malaconothridae ====
6 species

==== Family Mycobatidae ====
4 species

==== Family Nanhermanniidae ====
4 species

==== Family Nothridae ====
2 species

==== Family Perlohmanniidae ====
1 species

==== Family Phthiracaridae ====
4 species

- Phthiracarus affinis

=== Suborder Brachypylina ===
==== Family Carabodidae ====
5 species

==== Family Ceratozetidae ====
12 species

==== Family Chamobatidae ====
4 species

==== Family Ctenobelbidae ====
1 species

==== Family Cymbaeremaeidae ====
1 species

==== Family Damaeidae ====
3 species

- Belba corynopus

==== Family Eremaeidae ====
1 species

==== Family Galumnidae ====
2 species

==== Family Haplozetidae ====
1 species

==== Family Humerobatidae ====
1 species

==== Family Hydrozetidae ====
1 species

==== Family Liacaridae ====
4 species

==== Family Limnozetidae ====
2 species

==== Family Metrioppiidae ====
1 species

==== Family Micreremidae ====
1 species

==== Family Neoliodidae ====
1 species

==== Family Oppiidae ====
16 species

==== Family Oribatellidae ====
3 species

==== Family Oribatulidae ====
7 species

==== Family Passalozetidae ====
1 species

==== Family Phenopelopidae ====
8 species

==== Family Protoribatidae ====
1 species

==== Family Punctoribatidae ====
1 species

==== Family Quadroppiidae ====
1 species

==== Family Scheloribatidae ====
2 species

==== Family Scutoverticidae ====
2 species

==== Family Steganacaridae ====
2 species

==== Family Suctobelbidae ====
6 species

==== Family Tectocepheidae ====
1 species

==== Family Thyrisomidae ====
2 species

==== Family Xenillidae ====
1 species

=== Order Trombidiformes ===
==== Family Limnocharidae ====
- Limnochares aquatica

==== Family Tarsonemidae (thread-footed mites / white mites) ====
- Some species

==== Family Trombidiidae (red velvet mites) ====
- Trombidium holosericeum

== Order Araneae (spiders) ==
390 species belonging to 31 families

=== Family Agelenidae (funnel-web spiders) ===
- Agelena labyrinthica
- Cryphoeca silvicola (C.L. Koch, 1834)
- Eratigena agrestis
- Giant house spider (Eratigena atrica)
- Malthonica pagana C.L. Koch, 1841
- Tegenaria domestica
- Tegenaria parietina
- Tegenaria silvestris
- Textrix denticulata (Olivier, 1789)

=== Family Amaurobiidae (tangled nest spiders) ===
- Amaurobius fenestralis (Lace-webbed spider)
- Amaurobius ferox (black lace-weaver)
- Amaurobius similis (Lace-webbed spider)

=== Family Anyphaenidae ===
- Anyphaena accentuata (Walckenaer, 1802)

=== Family Araneidae (typical orb-weavers) ===
- Agalenatea redii
- Araneus diadematus (European green spider)
- Araneus quadratus (four-spot orbweaver)
- Araneus sturmi
- Araneus triguttatus
- Araniella cucurbitina (cucumber green spider)
- Araniella opisthographa (Kulczynski, 1905)
- Araniella displicata (Hentz, 1847)
- Atea triguttata (Fabricius, 1775)
- Cyclosa conica
- Gibbaranea gibbosa
- Hypsosinga albovittata
- Hypsosinga pygmaea
- Furrow orb spider (Larinioides cornutus)
- Larinioides patagiatus (Clerck, 1757)
- Larinioides sclopetarius (Clerck, 1757)
- Mangora acalypha (Walckenaer, 1802)
- Walnut orb-weaver spider (Nuctenea umbratica)
- Zygiella atrica
- Silver-sided sector spider (Zygiella x-notata)

=== Family Atypidae (purseweb spiders) ===
- Atypus affinis

=== Family Cheiracanthiidae ===
- Cheiracanthium erraticum (Walckenaer, 1802)
- Cheiracanthium virescens (Sundevall, 1833)

=== Family Clubionidae (sac spiders) ===
- Clubiona brevipes
- Clubiona comta
- Clubiona diversa
- Clubiona juvenis Simon, 1878
- Clubiona lutescens
- Clubiona neglecta
- Clubiona pallidula
- Clubiona phragmitis
- Clubiona reclusa
- Clubiona stagnatilis
- Clubiona subtilis
- Clubiona terrestris
- Clubiona trivialis

=== Family Cybaeidae ===
- Diving bell spider (Argyroneta aquatica)

=== Family Dictynidae ===
- Argenna subnigra (O.P.-Cambridge, 1861)
- Dictyna arundinacea
- Dictyna latens
- Dictyna uncinata Thorell, 1856
- Nigma puella

=== Family Dysderidae (woodlouse hunters) ===
- Woodlouse spider (Dysdera crocata)
- Dysdera erythrina
- Harpactea hombergi (Scopoli, 1763)

=== Family Gnaphosidae (flat-bellied ground spiders) ===
- Drassodes cupreus
- Drassodes lapidosus (Walckenaer, 1802)
- Drassyllus lutetianus (L. Koch, 1866)
- Drassyllus pusillus
- Haplodrassus signifer
- Micaria pulicaria
- Scotophaeus blackwalli
- Zelotes apricorum (L. Koch, 1876)
- Zelotes electus (C.L.Koch, 1839)
- Zelotes latreillei (Simon, 1878)

=== Family Hahniidae (dwarf sheet spiders) ===
- Antistea elegans
- Hahnia helveola Simon, 1875
- Hahnia montana (Blackwall, 1841)
- Hahnia nava
- Hahnia pusilla

=== Family Linyphiidae (sheet weavers) ===
- Agyneta cauta
- Agyneta decora (O.P.-Cambridge, 1871)
- Agyneta conigera
- Agyneta olivacea
- Agyneta ramosa
- Agyneta subtilis
- Allomengea scopigera (Grube, 1859)
- Allomengea vidua (L.Koch, 1879)
- Aphileta misera (O.P.-Cambridge, 1882)
- Araeoncus crassiceps(Westring, 1861)
- Araeoncus humilis
- Asthenargus paganus (Simon, 1884)
- Baryphyma gowerense (Locket, 1965)
- Baryphyma trifrons (O.P.-Cambridge, 1863)
- Bathyphantes approximatus (O.P.-Cambridge, 1871)
- Bathyphantes gracilis
- Bathyphantes nigrinus (Westring, 1851)
- Bathyphantes parvulus (Westring, 1851)
- Bathyphantes setiger F.O.P.-Cambridge, 1894
- Bolyphantes alticeps (Sundevall, 1833)
- Bolyphantes luteolus (Blackwall, 1833)
- Carorita limnaea (Crosby & Bishop, 1927)
- Carorita paludosa Duffey, 1971
- Centromerita bicolor (Blackwall, 1833)
- Centromerita concinna (Thorell, 1875)
- Centromerus arcanus (O.P.-Cambridge, 1873)
- Centromerus dilutus (O.P.-Cambridge, 1875)
- Centromerus levitarsis (Simon, 1884)
- Centromerus prudens (O.P.-Cambridge, 1873)
- Ceratinella brevipes (Westring, 1851)
- Ceratinella brevis (Wider, 1834)
- Ceratinella scabrosa (O.P.-Cambridge, 1871)
- Centromerus persimilis (O.P.-Cambridge, 1912)
- Centromerus sylvaticus (Blackwall, 1841)
- Cnephalocotes obscurus (Blackwall, 1834)
- Collinsia inerrans (O.P.-Cambridge, 1885)
- Dicymbium brevisetosum Locket, 1962
- Dicymbium nigrum (Blackwall, 1834)
- Dicymbium tibiale (Blackwall, 1836)
- Diplocentria bidentata (Emerton, 1882)
- Diplocephalus cristatus (Blackwall, 1833)
- Diplocephalus latifrons (O.P.-Cambridge, 1863)
- Diplocephalus permixtus (O.P.-Cambridge, 1871)
- Diplocephalus picinus (Blackwall, 1841)
- Diplostyla concolor (Wider, 1834)
- Dismodicus bifrons (Blackwall, 1841)
- Donacochara speciosa (Thorell, 1875)
- Invisible spider (Drapetisca socialis(Sundevall, 1833))
- Drepanotylus uncatus (O.P.-Cambridge, 1873)
- Entelecara errata O.P.-Cambridge, 1913
- Entelecara erythropus (Westring, 1851)
- Entelecara media Kulczynski, 1887
- Entelecara omissa (O.P.-Cambridge, 1902)
- Erigone arctica (White, 1852)
- Erigone atra
- Erigone dentipalpis (Wider, 1834)
- Erigone longipalpis
- Erigone capra Simon, 1884
- Erigone promiscua (O.P.-Cambridge, 1872)
- Erigone welchi Jackson, 1911
- Erigonella hiemalis (Blackwall, 1841)
- Erigonella ignobilis (O.P.-Cambridge, 1871)
- Evansia merens O.P.-Cambridge, 1900
- Floronia bucculenta
- Glyphesis cottonae (La Touche, 1945)
- Gnathonarium dentatum (Wider, 1834)
- Gonatium rubellum (Blackwall, 1841)
- Gonatium rubens
- Gongylidiellum latebricola (O.P.-Cambridge, 1871)
- Gongylidiellum murcidum Simon, 1884
- Gongylidiellum vivum (O.P.-Cambridge, 1875)
- Gongylidium rufipes (Linnaeus, 1758)
- Halorates reprobus (O.P.-Cambridge, 1879)
- Helophora insignis (Blackwall, 1841)
- Hilaira excisa (O.P.-Cambridge, 1871)
- Hilaira frigida (Thorell, 1872)
- Hilaira pervicax Hull, 1908
- Hylyphantes graminicola
- Hypselistes jacksoni (O.P.-Cambridge, 1902)
- Hypomma bituberculatum (Wider, 1834)
- Hypomma cornutum (Blackwall, 1833)
- Hypomma fulvum Büsenberg, 1902
- Jacksonella falconeri (Jackson, 1908)
- Kaestneria dorsalis (Wider, 1834)
- Kaestneria pullata (O.P.-Cambridge, 1863)
- Labulla thoracica (Wider, 1834)
- Lepthyphantes alacris (Blackwall, 1853) = Tenuiphantes
- Lepthyphantes angulatus (O.P.-Cambridge, 1881) = Oryphantes
- Lepthyphantes cristatus (Menge, 1866) = Tenuiphantes
- Lepthyphantes ericaeus (Blackwall, 1853)
- Lepthyphantes flavipes (Blackwall, 1854)
- Lepthyphantes insignis O.P.-Cambridge, 1913 = Tenuiphantes
- Lepthyphantes mengei Kulczynski, 1887
- Lepthyphantes minutus
- Lepthyphantes nebulosus (Sundevall, 1830) = Tenuiphantes
- Lepthyphantes obscurus (Blackwall, 1841) = Centromerus
- Lepthyphantes pallidus (O.P.-Cambridge, 1871) = Tenuiphantes
- Lepthyphantes tenebricola (Wider, 1834) = Tenuiphantes
- Lepthyphantes tenuis
- Lepthyphantes whymperi F.O.P.-Cambridge, 1894 = Tenuiphantes
- Lepthyphantes zimmermanni Bertkau, 1890 = Tenuiphantes
- Leptorhoptrum robustum (Westring, 1851)
- Leptothrix hardyi (Blackwall, 1850)
- Lessertia dentichelis (Simon, 1884)
- Linyphia hortensis
- Linyphia triangularis
- Lophomma punctatum (Blackwall, 1841)
- Macrargus rufus (Wider, 1834)
- Maro minutus O.P.-Cambridge, 1906
- Maso sundevalli (Westring, 1851)
- Mecopisthes peusi Wunderlich, 1972
- Meioneta beata (O.P.-Cambridge, 1906)
- Meioneta gulosa (C.L. Koch, 1869)
- Meioneta innotabilis (O.P.-Cambridge, 1863)
- Meioneta mollis
- Meioneta mossica Schikora, 1993
- Meioneta rurestris
- Meioneta saxatilis sensu stricto (Blackwall, 1844)
- Metopobactrus prominulus (O.P.-Cambridge, 1872)
- Micrargus herbigradus sensu stricto (Blackwall, 1854)
- Micrargus subaequalis (Westring, 1851)
- Microctenonyx subitaneus (O.P.-Cambridge, 1875)
- Microlinyphia impigra (O.P.-Cambridge, 1871)
- Microlinyphia pusilla
- Microneta viaria
- Minicia marginella (Wider, 1834)
- Minyriolus pusillus (Wider, 1834)
- Mioxena blanda (Simon, 1884)
- Moebelia penicillata (Westring, 1851)
- Monocephalus castaneipes (Simon, 1884)
- Monocephalus fuscipes (Blackwall, 1836)
- Neriene clathrata (Sundevall, 1830)
- Neriene montana
- Neriene peltata
- Oedothorax agrestis (Blackwall, 1853)
- Oedothorax apicatus (Blackwall, 1850)
- Oedothorax fuscus (Blackwall, 1834)
- Oedothorax gibbosus
- Oedothorax retusus (Westring, 1851)
- Ostearius melanopygius (O.P.-Cambridge, 1879)
- Oreonetides vaginatus (Thorell, 1872)
- Pelecopsis mengei (Simon, 1884)
- Pelecopsis nemoralis (Blackwall, 1841)
- Pelecopsis parallela (Wider, 1834
- Peponocranium ludicrum (O.P.-Cambridge, 1861)
- Pocadicnemis juncea Locket & Millidge, 1953
- Pocadicnemis pumila sensu stricto (Blackwall, 1841)
- Poeciloneta variegata (Blackwall, 1841)
- Porrhomma campbelli F.O.P.-Cambridge, 1894
- Porrhomma convexum (Westring, 1851)
- Porrhomma egeria Simon, 1884
- Porrhomma errans (Blackwall, 1841)
- Porrhomma montanum Jackson, 1913
- Porrhomma oblitum (O.P.-Cambridge, 1871)
- Porrhomma pallidum Jackson, 1913
- Porrhomma pygmaeum
- Porrhomma rosenhaueri (L. Koch, 1872)
- Praestigia duffeyi (Millidge, 1954)
- Rhaebothorax morulus (O.P.-Cambridge, 1873)
- Saaristoa abnormis (Blackwall, 1841)
- Saaristoa firma (O.P.-Cambridge, 1905)
- Saloca diceros (O.P.-Cambridge, 1871)
- Satilatlas britteni (Jackson, 1913)
- Savignia frontata
- Semljicola fausta (O.P.-Cambridge, 1900) = Eboria
- Silometopus ambiguus (O.P.-Cambridge, 1905)
- Silometopus elegans (O.P.-Cambridge, 1872)
- Silometopus incurvatus (O.P.-Cambridge, 1873)
- Silometopus reussi (Thorell, 1871)
- Sintula corniger (Blackwall, 1856)
- Stemonyphantes lineatus (Linnaeus, 1758)
- Styloctetor stativus (Simon, 1881)
- Tallusia experta (O.P.-Cambridge, 1871)
- Tapinocyba insecta (L. Koch, 1869)
- Tapinocyba pallens (O.P.-Cambridge, 1872)
- Tapinocyba praecox (O.P.-Cambridge, 1873)
- Tapinopa longidens
- Taranucnus setosus (O.P.-Cambridge, 1863)
- Thyreosthenius parasiticus (Westring, 1851)
- Tiso vagans (Blackwall, 1834)
- Tmeticus affinis (Blackwall, 1855)
- Trichoncus saxicola (O.P.-Cambridge, 1861)
- Trichopterna thorelli (Westring, 1861)
- Troxochrus cirrifrons (O.P.-Cambridge, 1871)
- Troxochrus scabriculus (Westring, 1851)
- Typhochrestus digitatus (O.P.-Cambridge, 1872)
- Walckenaeria acuminata
- Walckenaeria alticeps (Denis, 1952)
- Walckenaeria antica
- Walckenaeria atrotibialis
- Walckenaeria capito (Westring, 1861)
- Walckenaeria clavicornis (Emerton, 1882)
- Walckenaeria corniculans (O.P.-Cambridge, 1875)
- Walckenaeria cucullata (C.L. Koch, 1836)
- Walckenaeria cuspidata Blackwall, 1833
- Walckenaeria dysderoides (Wider, 1834)
- Walckenaeria kochi (O.P.-Cambridge, 1872)
- Walckenaeria monoceros (Wider, 1834)
- Walckenaeria nodosa
- Walckenaeria nudipalpis
- Walckenaeria unicornis O.P.-Cambridge, 1861
- Walckenaeria vigilax

=== Family Liocranidae (Liocranid sac spiders) ===
- Agraecina striata (Kulczynski, 1882)
- Agroeca proxima (O.P.-Cambridge, 1871)
- Liocranum rupicola
- Phrurolithus festivus (C.L. Koch, 1835)
- Scotina gracilipes (Blackwall, 1859)
- Scotina celans (Blackwall, 1841)

=== Family Lycosidae (wolf spiders) ===
- Alopecosa cuneata (Clerck, 1757)
- Alopecosa pulverulenta
- Arctosa cinerea (Fabricius, 1777)
- Arctosa leopardus (Sundevall, 1833)
- Arctosa perita (Latreille, 1799)
- Pardosa agrestis (Westring, 1861)
- Pardosa agricola
- Spotted wolf spider (Pardosa amentata)
- Pardosa lugubris
- Pardosa monticola
- Pardosa nigriceps
- Pardosa palustris
- Pardosa prativaga (L.Koch, 1870)
- Pardosa purbeckensis O.P.-Cambridge, 1895
- Pardosa pullata (Clerck, 1757)
- Pardosa saltans Töpfer-Hofmann, 2000
- Pirata hygrophilus Thorell, 1872
- Pirata latitans (Blackwall, 1841)
- Pirata piraticus
- Pirata piscatorius (Clerck, 1757)
- Pirata tenuitarsis Simon, 1876
- Pirata uliginosus (Thorell, 1856)
- Trochosa ruricola
- Trochosa spinipalpis
- Trochosa terricola

=== Family Mimetidae (pirate spiders) ===
- Ero cambridgei
- Ero furcata

=== Family Miturgidae ===
- Zora spinimana

=== Family Nesticidae (scaffold web spiders) ===
- Nesticus cellulanus

=== Family Oonopidae (goblin spiders) ===
- Oonops domesticus
- Oonops pulcher

=== Family Philodromidae (running crab spiders) ===
- Philodromus aureolus
- Philodromus cespitum
- Philodromus dispar Walckenaer, 1826
- Philodromus emarginatus (Schrank, 1803)
- Thanatus striatus
- Tibellus maritimus (Menge, 1875)
- Tibellus oblongus

=== Family Pholcidae (cellar spiders) ===
- Skull spider (Pholcus phalangioides)

=== Family Pisauridae (nursery web spiders) ===
- Raft spider (Dolomedes fimbriatus)
- Pisaura mirabilis

=== Family Salticidae (jumping spiders) ===
- Calositticus caricis (syn. Sitticus caricis)
- Euophrys frontalis
- Evarcha falcata
- Heliophanus cupreus
- Heliophanus flavipes (Hahn, 1832)
- Marpissa nivoyi (Lucas, 1846)
- Neon reticulatus
- Neon robustus Lohmander, 1945
- Pseudeuophrys erratica
- Pseudeuophrys lanigera
- Salticus scenicus
- Salticus cingulatus (Panzer, 1797)
- Sitticus floricola
- Sitticus pubescens (Fabricius, 1775)
- Talavera aequipes
- Talavera petrensis C.L. Koch, 1837

=== Family Segestriidae (tube-dwelling spiders) ===
- Snake-back spider (Segestria senoculata)

=== Family Scytodidae ===
- Scytodes thoracica Latreille, 1804

=== Family Sparassidae ===
- Micrommata roseum (Clerck, 1757)

=== Family Tetragnathidae (long-jawed orb weavers) ===
- European cave spider (Meta menardi)
- Metellina mengei
- Metellina merianae
- Metellina segmentata
- Pachygnatha clercki
- Pachygnatha degeeri
- Pachygnatha listeri Sundevall, 1830
- Tetragnatha extensa
- Tetragnatha montana Simon, 1874
- Tetragnatha nigricans Lendl, 1886
- Tetragnatha obtusa C.L. Koch, 1837
- Tetragnatha pinicola L. Koch, 1870
- Tetragnatha striata L. Koch, 1862

=== Family Theridiidae (tangle-web spiders) ===
- Achaearanea lunata (Clerck, 1757)= Parasteatoda
- Achaearanea tepidariorum = Parasteatoda
- Anelosimus vittatus (C.L.Koch, 1836)
- Asagena phalerata (Panzer, 1801)
- Crustulina sticta
- Cryptachaea riparia
- Dipoena melanogaster
- Dipoena tristis (Hahn, 1833)
- Enoplognatha ovata
- Enoplognatha latimana Hippa & Oksala 1982
- Enoplognatha thoracica
- Episinus angulatus
- Episinus truncatus
- Euryopis flavomaculata
- Neottiura bimaculata
- Paidiscura pallens (Blackwall, 1834)
- Pholcomma gibbum (Westring, 1851)
- Platnickina tincta
- Robertus arundineti (O.P.-Cambridge, 1871)
- Robertus lividus (Blackwall, 1836)
- Robertus neglectus
- Rugathodes bellicosus
- Rugathodes instabilis (O.P.-Cambridge, 1871)
- Simitidion simile (C.L.Koch, 1836)
- Rabbit-hutch spider (Steatoda bipunctata; also called "false widow")
- Steatoda grossa
- Steatoda nobilis
- Steatoda paykulliana ("false widow")
- Theonoe minutissima (O.P.-Cambridge, 1879)
- Theridion blackwalli O.P.-Cambridge, 1871
- Theridion impressum L.Koch, 1881 = Phylloneta
- Theridion melanurum Hahn, 1831
- Theridion mystaceum L.Koch, 1870
- Theridion sisyphium (Clerck, 1757) = Phylloneta
- Theridion varians

=== Family Theridiosomatidae (ray spiders) ===
- Theridiosoma gemmosum

=== Family Thomisidae (crab spiders) ===
- Diaea dorsata
- Goldenrod crab spider (Misumena vatia)
- Ozyptila atomaria
- Ozyptila brevipes (Hahn, 1826)
- Ozyptila sanctuaria (O.P.-Cambridge, 1871)
- Ozyptila trux
- Ozyptila praticola (C.L. Koch, 1837)
- Xysticus audax
- Xysticus cristatus
- Xysticus erraticus (Blackwall, 1834)
- Xysticus lanio
- Xysticus luctuosus (Blackwall, 1836)
- Xysticus sabulosus (Hahn, 1832)
- Xysticus ulmi

=== Family Uloboridae (hackled orb weavers) ===
- Hyptiotes paradoxus

== See also ==
Encyclopedia of Life online has many images via search Dictynoidea Placements

== Further information ==
- Fauna Europaea

== Identification ==
Key works are:-

- Jones, Dick, 1983 The Country Life Guide to spiders of Britain and Northern Europe Country Life Books/Hamlyn
- Jones-WaltersL.M., Keys to Families of British Spiders AIDGAP Guide, Field Studies Council No. 197, 1989.
- Locket, G.H. and Millidge, A.F. British Spiders . Vol I 1951, Vol II 1953 Ray Society of London.
- Locket, G.H., Millidge, A.F. and Merrett P. British Spiders Vol III 1974 Ray Society of London.
- Roberts, Michael J., The Spiders of Great Britain and Ireland Vols I, II, 1985, III 1987. Harley Books
- Roberts, Michael J., 1993 The Spiders of Great Britain and Ireland Compact Edition Harley Books, 1993
- Roberts, Michael J., 1995 Collins Field Guide: Spiders of Britain and Northern Europe Harper Collins

Peter C. Barnard, 1999 Identifying British insects and arachnids: an annotated bibliography of key works Cambridge University Press ISBN 0 521 63241 2 provides a comprehensive list of identification literature.
