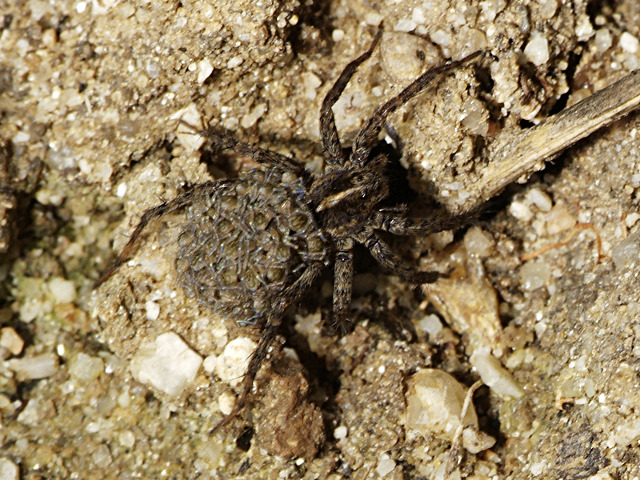
- Pardosa monticola

Scientific classification
- Kingdom: Animalia
- Phylum: Arthropoda
- Subphylum: Chelicerata
- Class: Arachnida
- Order: Araneae
- Infraorder: Araneomorphae
- Family: Lycosidae
- Genus: Pardosa
- Species: P. monticola

Binomial name
- Pardosa monticola (Clerck, 1757)

Synonyms
- Lycosa monticola (Clerck, 1757); Araneus monticola (Clerck, 1757)

= Pardosa monticola =

Species of spider

Pardosa monticola, or pin-stripe wolf spider, is a species of wolf spider found mainly in Europe. It is found in both dry and humid habitats, and up to an altitude of 2000m.

== Description ==
Females are 5 mm to 7 mm in length, males 4 mm to 6 mm. The female has a dark brown abdomen with white spots along the flank and an obvious light brown cardiac mark, the carapace is dark brown with a white median band with two narrow white stripes on either side. The legs and palps are brown with darker spots and the legs have dark spines. The males are almost identical to the females but are darker and lack the darker spots on the legs but do have dark femora and coxae. P. monticola is similar to Pardosa agrestis and Pardosa palustris.

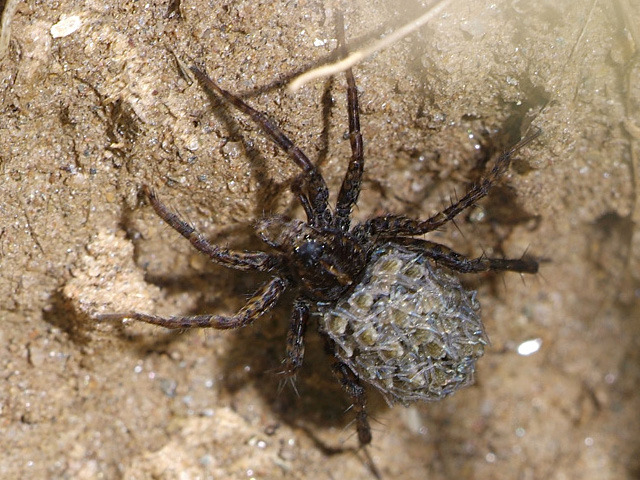

== Distribution ==
Widespread in western and central Europe largely west of 25° east. In Britain extends northwards to central Scotland. Its presence has been confirmed in all the countries of Europe east to Finland and Estonia but its presence is unconfirmed in Moldova, Ukraine and Belarus and is unrecorded in Greece.

== Biology ==
Pardosa monticola is normally found in open short vegetation in grasslands, meadows, open heaths and dunes, especially where the land is not subject to any form of improvement. P. monticola can be numerous in areas of chalk grassland and on stabilised dunes. In some parts of Britain, e.g. Wiltshire, it is usually found exclusively in the short sward of chalk downland. Adults are active mainly from early to mid-summer, females later than males. A study on the Frisian island of Schiermonnikoog found that in sympatry with Pardosa nigriceps and Pardosa pullata P. monticola preferred the arid, less vegetated parts of the study area and was found more often in the ground layer than its cogeners.
