= Oxus (disambiguation) =

Oxus may refer to:

- Oxus River, also called the Amu Darya, Amu or Amo River, a major river in Central Asia.
- Oxus valley (disambiguation)
- Oxus civilization, a bronze age civilization of central Asia
- Oxus (god), an Eastern Iranian god regarded as the personification of the Amu Darya
- Oxus cobra, also known as the Caspian cobra, Central Asian cobra, or Russian cobra
- Oxus (mite), a genus of mite in the family Oxidae

== See also ==
- Oxus Treasure
- Transoxiana
