= Exochocepheus eremitus =

Scientific classification
- Domain: Eukaryota
- Kingdom: Animalia
- Phylum: Arthropoda
- Subphylum: Chelicerata
- Class: Arachnida
- Order: Oribatida
- Family: Scutoverticidae
- Genus: Exochocepheus
- Species: E. eremitus

Binomial name
- Exochocepheus eremitus Woolley & Higgins, 1968

Species of mite

Exochocepheus eremitus is a species of mite in the family Scutoverticidae.
