= Podothrombium manolatesicus =

Scientific classification
- Kingdom: Animalia
- Phylum: Arthropoda
- Subphylum: Chelicerata
- Class: Arachnida
- Order: Trombidiformes
- Family: Podothrombiidae
- Genus: Podothrombium
- Species: P. manolatesicus

Binomial name
- Podothrombium manolatesicus Haitlinger, 2006

Species of mite

Podothrombium manolatesicus is a species of mite belonging to the family Podothrombiidae, first described from Greece.
