= Teutonia =

Teutonia may refer to:

- Germany
- K.D.St.V. Teutonia, an academic German fraternity in Fribourg, Switzerland.
- Teutonia Maennerchor Hall in (Deutschtown) Pittsburgh, PA
- Teutônia, a municipality in Brazil
- 1044 Teutonia, an asteroid
- The land of the Teutons
- Free Society of Teutonia
- Monastic State of the Teutonic Knights
- Teutonia (ship)
- Teutonia (mite), genus of mites
- FC Teutonia Ottensen, a German association football club
- Teutonia Watzenborn-Steinberg, a German association football club
