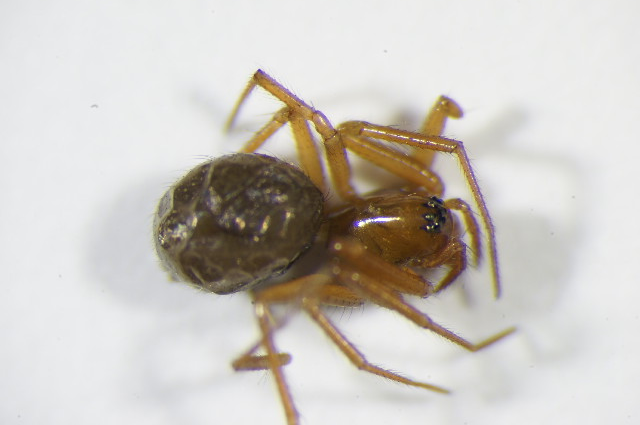
- A. misera

Scientific classification
- Kingdom: Animalia
- Phylum: Arthropoda
- Subphylum: Chelicerata
- Class: Arachnida
- Order: Araneae
- Infraorder: Araneomorphae
- Family: Linyphiidae
- Genus: Aphileta; Hull, 1920

Type species
- A. misera (O. Pickard-Cambridge, 1882)

Species
- A. centrasiatica Eskov, 1995 – Kazakhstan; A. misera (O. Pickard-Cambridge, 1882) – North America, Europe, Russia (Europe to Far East)

= Aphileta =

Genus of spiders

Aphileta is a genus of dwarf spiders that was first described by J.E. Hull in 1920. As of November 2026 it contains only two species, with A. centrasiatica only in Central Asia, while A. misera is widespread in the Palearctic ranging across Eurasia, and into the Nearctic of Canada and northeastern United States plus Alaska.

In some older taxonomic schemes, the North American Tmeticus microtarsus Emerton, 1882 was sometimes listed in online sources under Aphileta due to historical confusion about the identity of former genus Hillhousia which this species was associated with by Ivie, 1967. However, various modern scientific publications instead treat the taxon as Eulaira microtarsus (Emerton, 1882).
