= Minunthozetes =

Scientific classification
- Kingdom: Animalia
- Phylum: Arthropoda
- Subphylum: Chelicerata
- Class: Arachnida
- Order: Sarcoptiformes
- Family: Punctoribatidae
- Genus: Minunthozetes; Hull, 1916

Genus of mites

Minunthozetes is a genus of mites belonging to the family Punctoribatidae.

The species of this genus are found in Europe and Western Asia.

Species:

- Minunthozetes atomus (Berlese, 1908)
- Minunthozetes bicornis (Berlese, 1908)
- Minunthozetes hemectus (Hull, 1915)
- Minunthozetes humectus (Hull, 1915)
- Minunthozetes major Mihelcic, 1957
- Minunthozetes pseudofusiger (Schweizer, 1922)
- Minunthozetes quadriareatus Mínguez, Subías & Ruiz, 1986
- Minunthozetes semirufus (Koch, 1841)
- Minunthozetes tarmani Feider, Vasiliu & Calugar, 1971
