= Saloca =

Scientific classification
- Kingdom: Animalia
- Phylum: Arthropoda
- Subphylum: Chelicerata
- Class: Arachnida
- Order: Araneae
- Infraorder: Araneomorphae
- Family: Linyphiidae
- Genus: Saloca; Simon, 1926

Type species
- S. diceros (O. Pickard-Cambridge, 1871)

Species
- 6, see text

Genus of spiders

Saloca is a genus of sheet weavers that was first described by Eugène Louis Simon in 1926.

== Species ==
As of May 2019 it contains six species, found in Europe, Russia, Nepal, Turkey, and Eastern Europe:

- Saloca diceros (O. Pickard-Cambridge, 1871) (type) – Europe
- Saloca elevata Wunderlich, 2011 – Turkey
- Saloca gorapaniensis Wunderlich, 1983 – Nepal
- Saloca khumbuensis Wunderlich, 1983 – Nepal
- Saloca kulczynskii Miller & Kratochvíl, 1939 – Central, Eastern Europe
- Saloca ryvkini Eskov & Marusik, 1994 – Russia
