= Saloca kulczynskii =

Scientific classification
- Domain: Eukaryota
- Kingdom: Animalia
- Phylum: Arthropoda
- Subphylum: Chelicerata
- Class: Arachnida
- Order: Araneae
- Infraorder: Araneomorphae
- Family: Linyphiidae
- Genus: Saloca
- Species: S. kulczynskii

Binomial name
- Saloca kulczynskii (Miller & Kratochvíl, 1939)

Species of spider

Saloca kulczynskii is a species of spider that can be found in such European countries as Czech Republic, Hungary, Poland, Romania, and Slovakia.
