= Exochocepheus =

Scientific classification
- Domain: Eukaryota
- Kingdom: Animalia
- Phylum: Arthropoda
- Subphylum: Chelicerata
- Class: Arachnida
- Order: Oribatida
- Family: Scutoverticidae
- Genus: Exochocepheus; Woolley & Higgins, 1968

Genus of mites

Exochocepheus is a genus of mites in the family Scutoverticidae. There are about seven described species in Exochocepheus.

== Species ==
These seven species belong to the genus Exochocepheus:

- Exochocepheus borealis (Rjabinin, 1984)
- Exochocepheus contiguus (Balogh & Csiszár, 1963)
- Exochocepheus eremitus Woolley & Higgins, 1968
- Exochocepheus hungaricus (Mahunka, 1987)
- Exochocepheus laticuspis (Balogh & Mahunka, 1965)
- Exochocepheus stenolamellatus (Golosova, 1984)
- Exochocepheus tuberculatus (Golosova, 1984)
