= Simitidion lacuna =

Scientific classification
- Domain: Eukaryota
- Kingdom: Animalia
- Phylum: Arthropoda
- Subphylum: Chelicerata
- Class: Arachnida
- Order: Araneae
- Infraorder: Araneomorphae
- Family: Theridiidae
- Genus: Simitidion
- Species: S. lacuna

Binomial name
- Simitidion lacuna Wunderlich, 1992

Species of spider

Simitidion lacuna is a species of comb-footed spider in the family Theridiidae. It is found in the Mediterranean.
