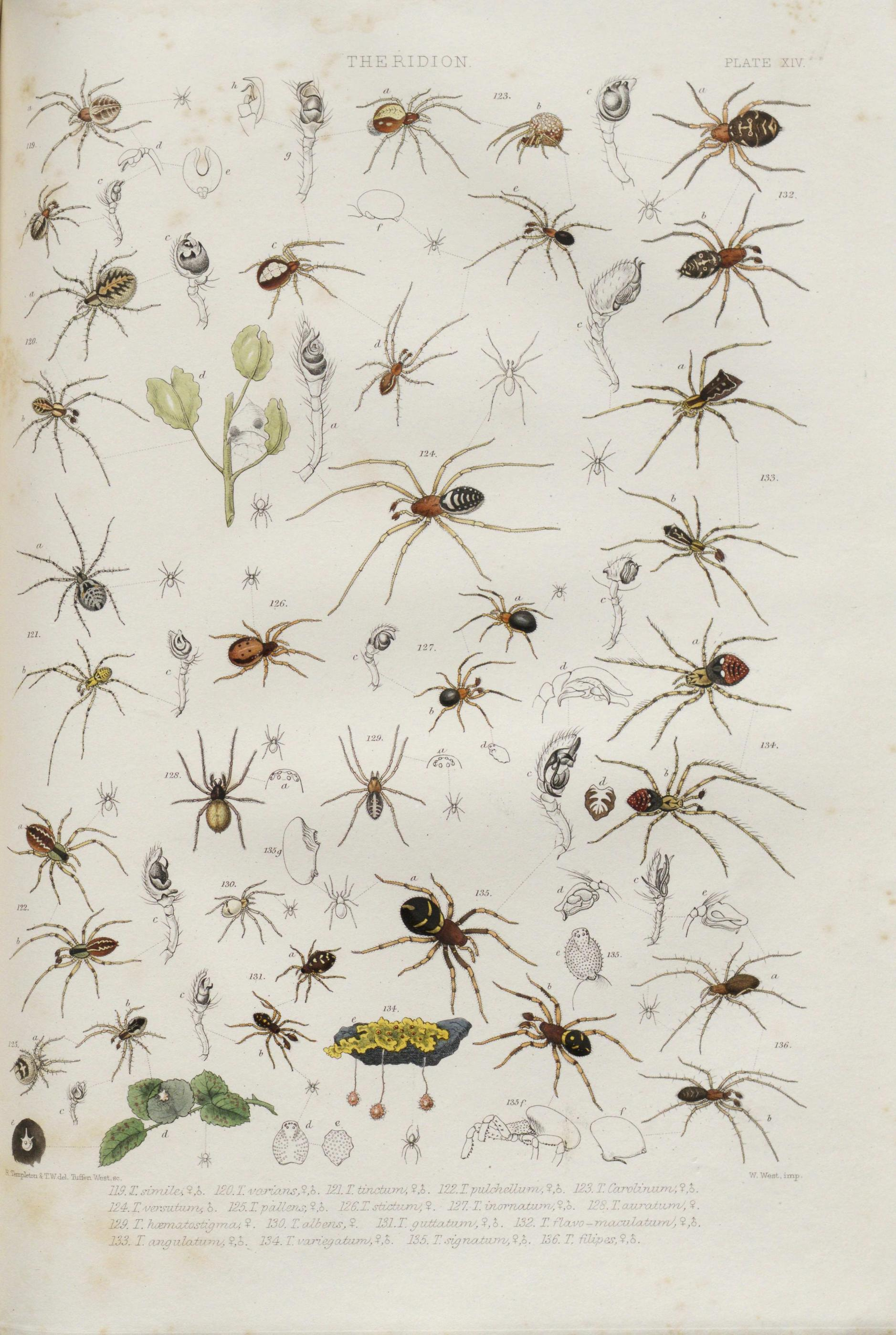
- Simitidion simile figure 119

Scientific classification
- Kingdom: Animalia
- Phylum: Arthropoda
- Subphylum: Chelicerata
- Class: Arachnida
- Order: Araneae
- Infraorder: Araneomorphae
- Family: Theridiidae
- Genus: Simitidion; Wunderlich, 1992

Type species
- S. simile (C. L. Koch, 1836)

Species
- S. agaricographum (Levy & Amitai, 1982) – Tunisia, Greece (mainland, Crete), Turkey, Cyprus, Israel; S. lacuna Wunderlich, 1992 – Canary Is., Spain, North Africa, Israel; S. simile (C. L. Koch, 1836) – Canada, Europe, North Africa, Turkey, Israel, Caucasus, Kazakhstan, Iran, Central Asia

= Simitidion =

Genus of spiders

Simitidion is a genus of comb-footed spiders that was first described by J. Wunderlich in 1992. As of June 2020 it contains three species, native to Africa, Asia and Europe, and introduced to Canada: S. agaricographum, S. lacuna, and S. simile.
