= Diplocentria =

Scientific classification
- Kingdom: Animalia
- Phylum: Arthropoda
- Subphylum: Chelicerata
- Class: Arachnida
- Order: Araneae
- Infraorder: Araneomorphae
- Family: Linyphiidae
- Genus: Diplocentria; Hull, 1911

Type species
- D. bidentata (Emerton, 1882)

Species
- 8, see text

Synonyms
- Microcentria Schenkel, 1925; Scotoussa Bishop & Crosby, 1938; Smodigoides Crosby & Bishop, 1936

Genus of spiders

Diplocentria is a genus of dwarf spiders that was first described by J. E. Hull in 1911.

== Species ==
As of May 2019 it contains eight species:

- Diplocentria bidentata (Emerton, 1882) (type) – North America, Europe, Russia (Europe to Far East), China
- Diplocentria changajensis Wunderlich, 1995 – Mongolia
- Diplocentria forsslundi Holm, 1939 – Sweden
- Diplocentria hiberna (Barrows, 1945) – USA
- Diplocentria mediocris (Simon, 1884) – Europe
- Diplocentria perplexa (Chamberlin & Ivie, 1939) – USA, Canada
- Diplocentria rectangulata (Emerton, 1915) – North America, Europe, Russia (Europe to Far East)
- Diplocentria retinax (Crosby & Bishop, 1936) – USA, Canada
