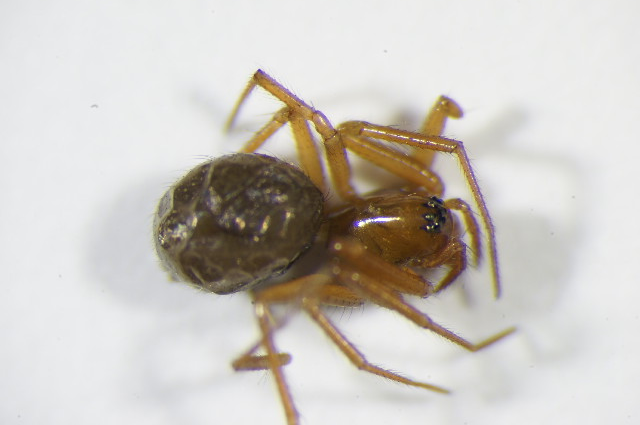

Conservation status
- Secure (NatureServe)

Scientific classification
- Kingdom: Animalia
- Phylum: Arthropoda
- Subphylum: Chelicerata
- Class: Arachnida
- Order: Araneae
- Infraorder: Araneomorphae
- Family: Linyphiidae
- Genus: Aphileta
- Species: A. misera

Binomial name
- Aphileta misera (O. P.-Cambridge, 1882)

= Aphileta misera =

Species of spider

Aphileta misera, sometimes called the miserable unloved money spider, is a species of dwarf spider in the family Linyphiidae. It is found in North America, Europe, and Russia (Siberia to Far East).
