= Oxus valley =

Oxus valley may refer to:

- Oxus river
- The Oxus civilization known as the Bactria-Margiana Archaeological Complex
