= Mideidae =

Scientific classification
- Domain: Eukaryota
- Kingdom: Animalia
- Phylum: Arthropoda
- Subphylum: Chelicerata
- Class: Arachnida
- Order: Trombidiformes
- Family: Mideidae

Family of trombidiform mites

Mideidae is a family of mites belonging to the order Trombidiformes.

== Genera ==
- Eumidea Tuzovskij, 1982
- Midea Bruzelius, 1854
