= Neoliodidae =

Neoliodidae Temporal range: Cretaceous–present

Scientific classification
- Kingdom: Animalia
- Phylum: Arthropoda
- Subphylum: Chelicerata
- Class: Arachnida
- Order: Oribatida
- Superfamily: Neoliodoidea
- Family: Neoliodidae; Sellnick, 1928

Synonyms
- Liodidae

Family of mites

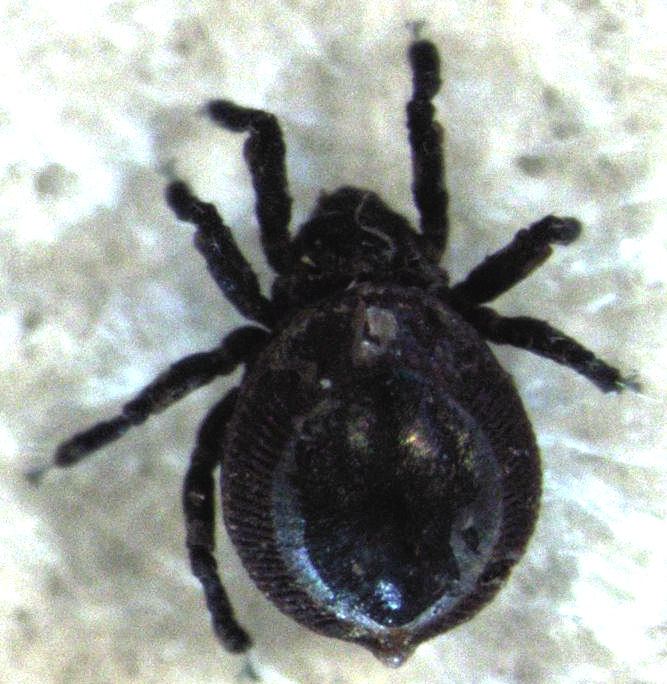
An adult specimen about 1 mm in length, with one leg missing

Neoliodidae is a family of oribatids in the order Oribatida. There are at least 4 genera and 50 described species in Neoliodidae.

== Genera ==
- Neoliodes Berlese, 1888
- Platyliodes Berlese, 1916
- Poroliodes Grandjean, 1934
- Teleioliodes Grandjean, 1934
