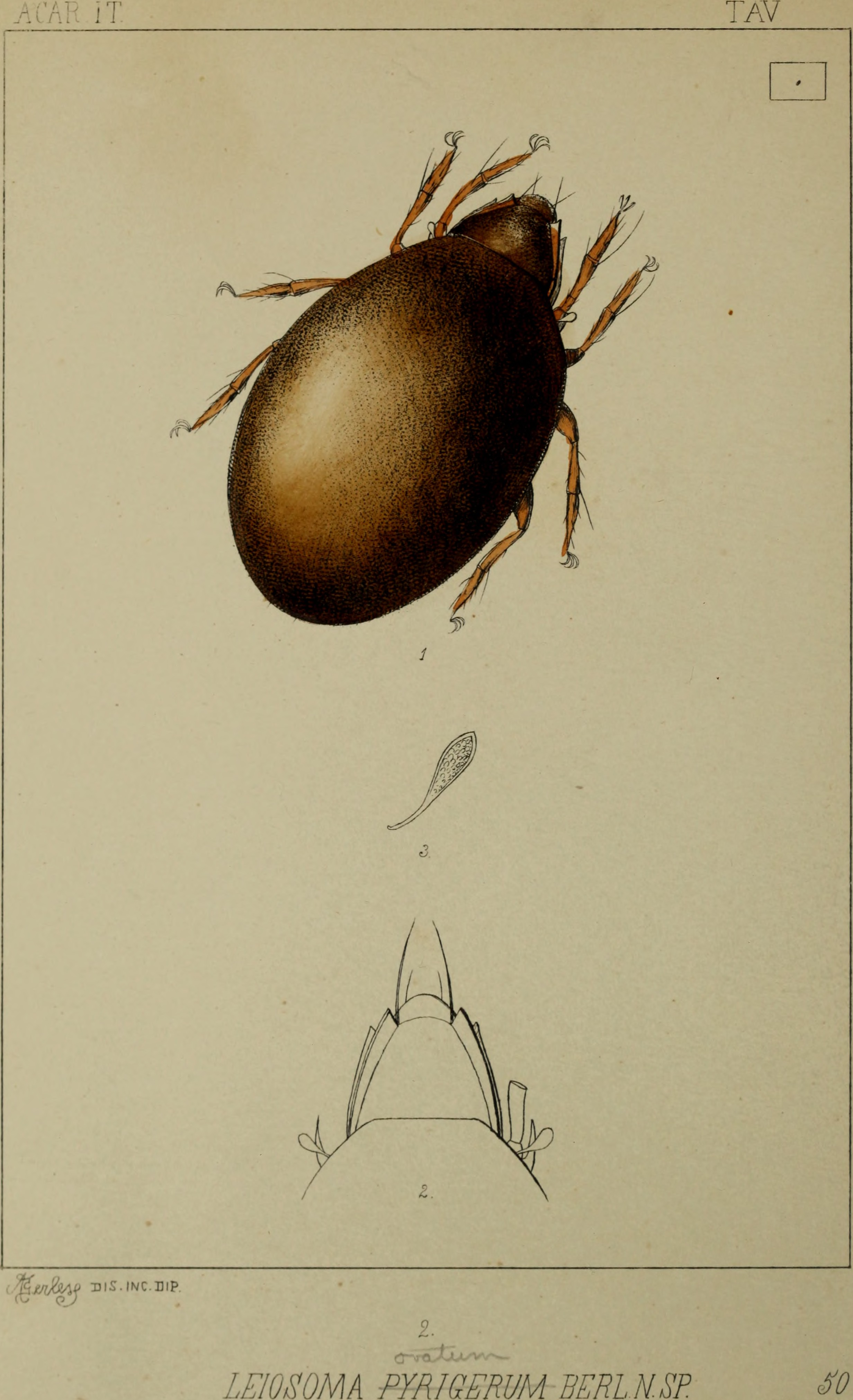
- Adoristes ovatus

Scientific classification
- Kingdom: Animalia
- Phylum: Arthropoda
- Subphylum: Chelicerata
- Class: Arachnida
- Order: Oribatida
- Suborder: Brachypylina
- Superfamily: Gustavioidea
- Family: Liacaridae; Sellnick, 1928

= Liacaridae =

Family of mites

Liacaridae is a family of mites in the order Oribatida. There are about ten genera and more than 240 described species in Liacaridae.

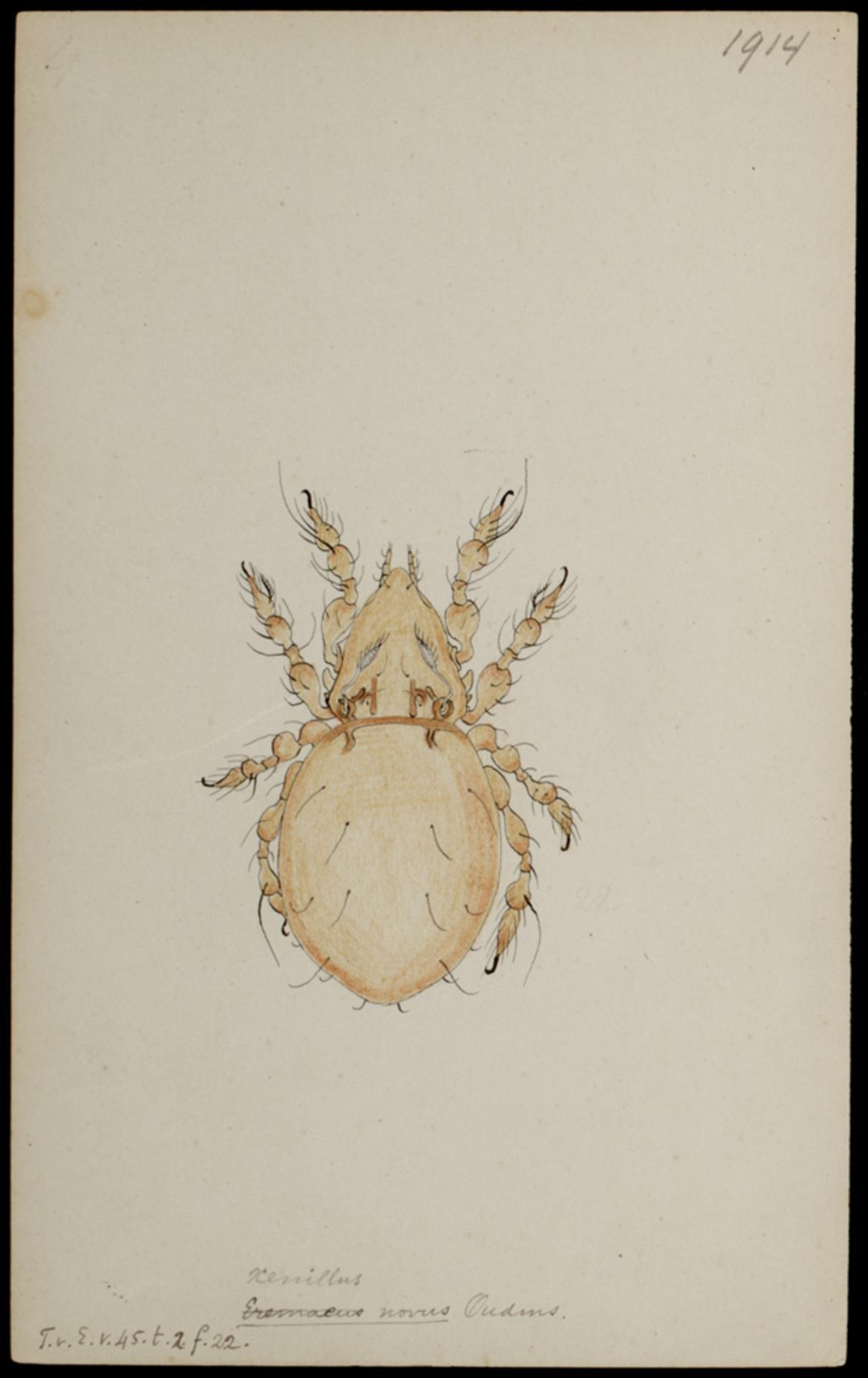
Xenillus

== Genera ==
The following genera are recognised in the family Liacaridae:

- Adoristes Hull, 1916
- Birsteinius Krivolutsky, 1965
- Dorycranosus Woolley, 1969
- Liacarus Michael, 1898
- Opsioristes Woolley, 1967
- Planoristes Iturrondobeitia & Subías, 1978
- †Procorynetes Woolley, 1969
- Rhaphidosus Woolley, 1969
- Scarabacarus Shtanchaeva & Subías, 2010
- Xenillus Robineau-Desvoidy, 1839
