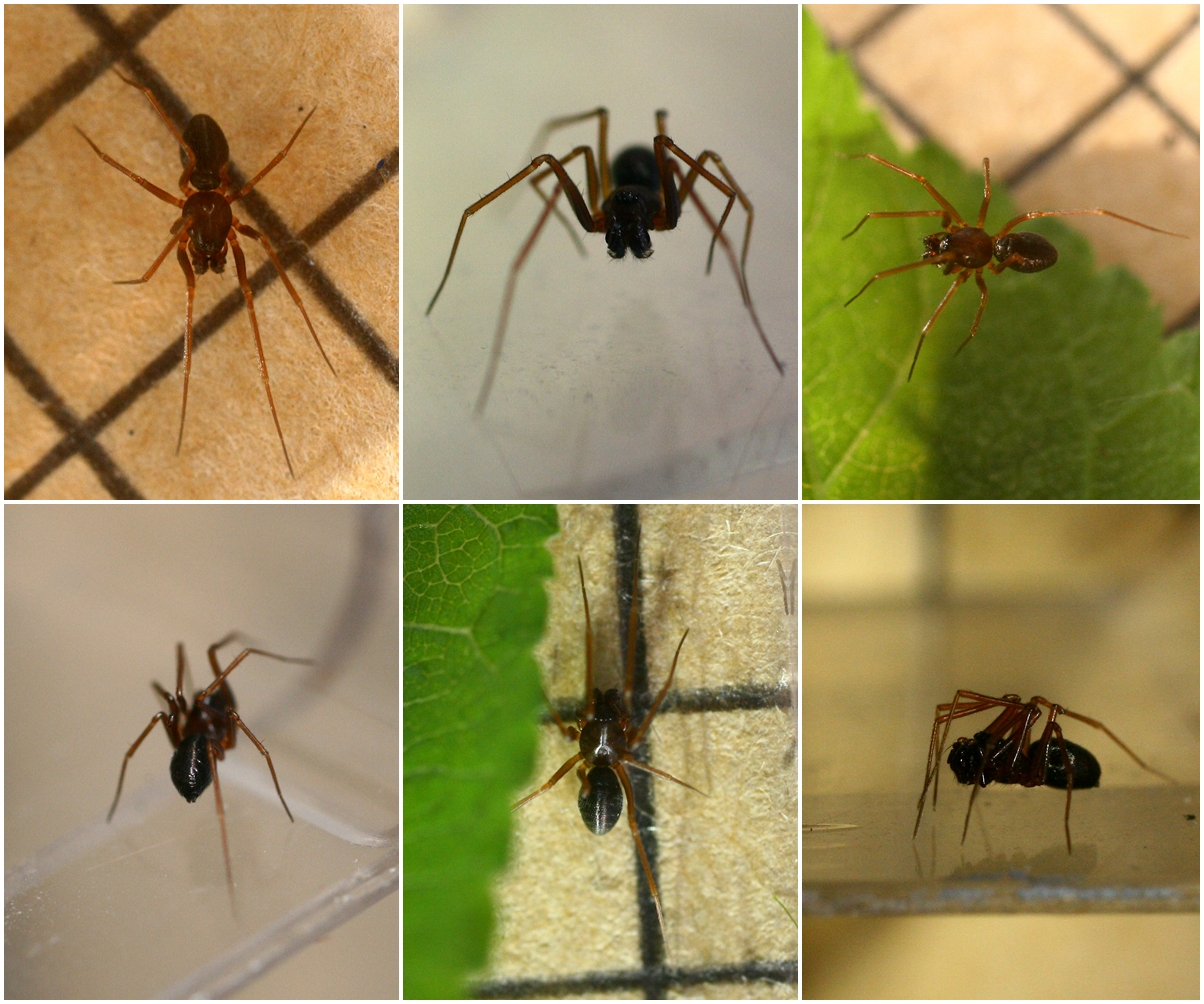
- D. concolor

Conservation status
- Secure (NatureServe)

Scientific classification
- Kingdom: Animalia
- Phylum: Arthropoda
- Subphylum: Chelicerata
- Class: Arachnida
- Order: Araneae
- Infraorder: Araneomorphae
- Family: Linyphiidae
- Genus: Diplostyla; Emerton, 1882
- Species: D. concolor

Binomial name
- Diplostyla concolor (Wider, 1834)

= Diplostyla =

Genus of spiders

Diplostyla is a monotypic genus of dwarf spiders containing the single species, Diplostyla concolor. It was first described by James Henry Emerton in 1882, and has only been found in Russia, and Turkey.
