= Diplocentria bidentata =

Conservation status
- Secure (NatureServe)

Scientific classification
- Kingdom: Animalia
- Phylum: Arthropoda
- Subphylum: Chelicerata
- Class: Arachnida
- Order: Araneae
- Infraorder: Araneomorphae
- Family: Linyphiidae
- Genus: Diplocentria
- Species: D. bidentata

Binomial name
- Diplocentria bidentata (Emerton, 1882)

Species of spider

Diplocentria bidentata is a species of dwarf spider in the family Linyphiidae. It is found in North America, Europe, a range from Russia (European to Far East), and China.
