= Saloca diceros =

Scientific classification
- Domain: Eukaryota
- Kingdom: Animalia
- Phylum: Arthropoda
- Subphylum: Chelicerata
- Class: Arachnida
- Order: Araneae
- Infraorder: Araneomorphae
- Family: Linyphiidae
- Genus: Saloca
- Species: S. diceros

Binomial name
- Saloca diceros (O. P. Cambridge, 1871)

Species of spider

Saloca diceros is a species of spider found in Europe.
