= Evansia =

Scientific classification
- Kingdom: Animalia
- Phylum: Arthropoda
- Subphylum: Chelicerata
- Class: Arachnida
- Order: Araneae
- Infraorder: Araneomorphae
- Family: Linyphiidae
- Genus: Evansia; O. Pickard-Cambridge, 1901
- Species: E. merens

Binomial name
- Evansia merens O. Pickard-Cambridge, 1901

Genus of spiders

Evansia is a monotypic genus of dwarf spiders containing the single species, Evansia merens. It was first described by Octavius Pickard-Cambridge in 1901, and has a palearctic distribution.
