= Punctoribatidae =

- Punctoribates palustris

Scientific classification
- Kingdom: Animalia
- Phylum: Arthropoda
- Subphylum: Chelicerata
- Class: Arachnida
- Order: Sarcoptiformes
- Family: Punctoribatidae; Thor, 1937

Synonyms
- Mycobatidae Grandjean, 1954

Family of mites

Punctoribatidae is a family of mites belonging to the order Sarcoptiformes.

== Genera ==
Genera:

- Allomycobates Aoki, 1976
- Alpizetes Mahunka, 2001
- Cryptobothia Wallwork, 1963
- Ellipsozetes Bernini, 1980
- Feiderzetes Subías, 1977
- Inigozetes Subías, 2000
- Minguezetes Subias, Kahwash & Ruiz, 1990
- Minunthozetes Hull, 1916
- Mycobates Hull, 1916
- Mycozetes Spain, 1968
- Neomycobates Wallwork, 1963
- Paralamellobates Bhaduri & Raychaudhuri, 1969
- Pelopsis Hall, 1911
- Permycobates Strenzke, 1954
- Punctoribates Berlese, 1908
- Punctorites
- Schweizerzetes Mahunka, 2001
- Selvazetes Behan-Pelletier, 1999
- Semipunctoribates Mahunka, 1987
- Zachvatkinibates Shaldybina, 1973
