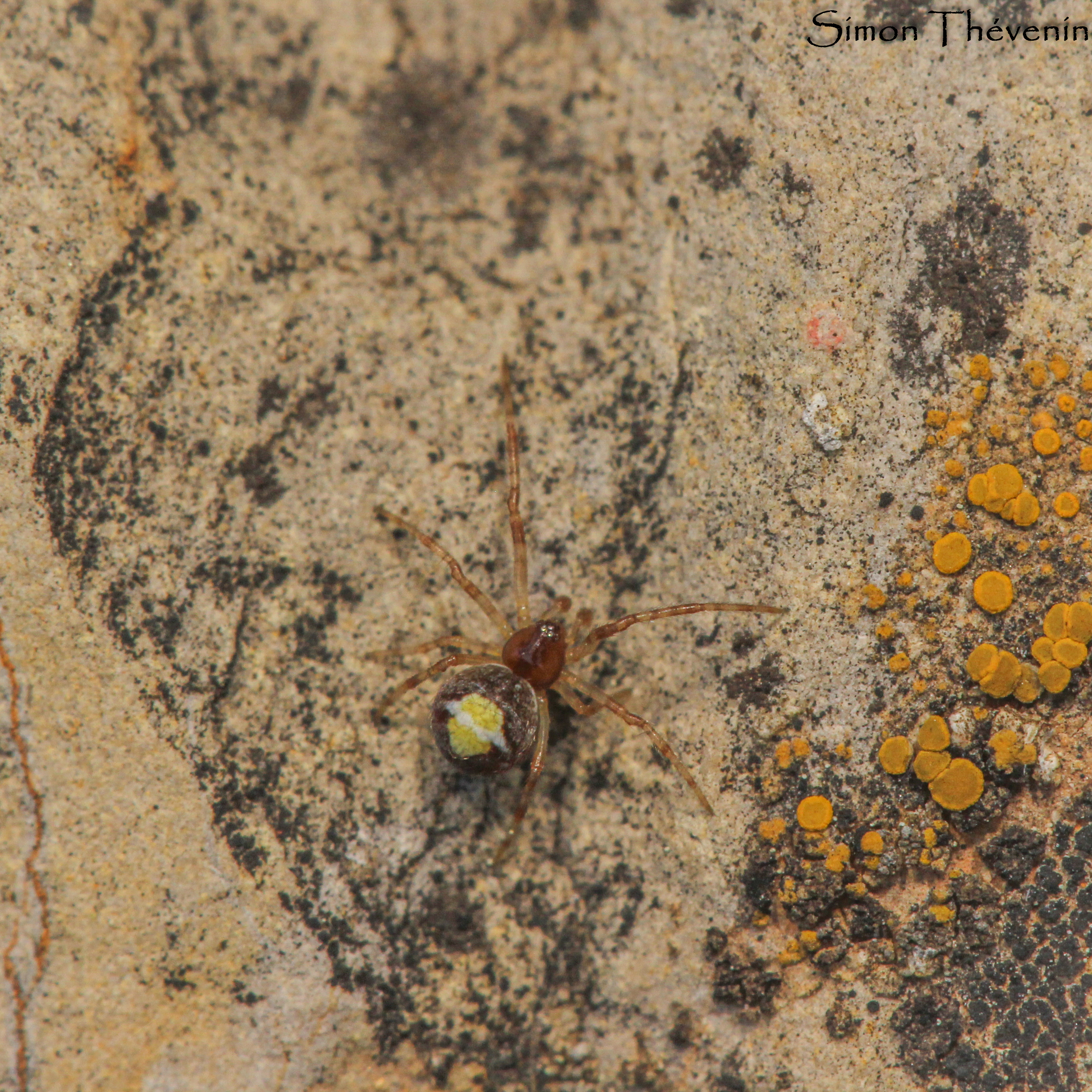

Scientific classification
- Kingdom: Animalia
- Phylum: Arthropoda
- Subphylum: Chelicerata
- Class: Arachnida
- Order: Araneae
- Infraorder: Araneomorphae
- Family: Theridiidae
- Genus: Simitidion
- Species: S. simile

Binomial name
- Simitidion simile (C.L. Koch, 1832)

= Simitidion simile =

Species of spider

Simitidion simile is a species of comb-footed spider in the family Theridiidae. It is native to Europe, North Africa, Turkey, Israel, Caucasus, Kazakhstan, Iran and Central Asia, and introduced to Canada.
