= Leptorhoptrum =

Scientific classification
- Kingdom: Animalia
- Phylum: Arthropoda
- Subphylum: Chelicerata
- Class: Arachnida
- Order: Araneae
- Infraorder: Araneomorphae
- Family: Linyphiidae
- Genus: Leptorhoptrum; Kulczyński, 1894
- Species: L. robustum

Binomial name
- Leptorhoptrum robustum (Westring, 1851)

Synonyms
- Nanavia Chamberlin & Ivie, 1933

Genus of spiders

Leptorhoptrum is a monotypic genus of dwarf spiders containing the single species, Leptorhoptrum robustum. It was first described by C. Chyzer & Władysław Kulczyński in 1894, and has only been found in Japan, and Russia.
