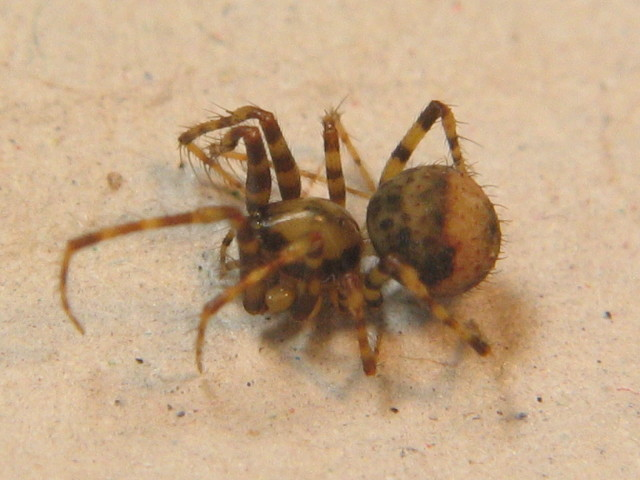
- Ero furcata, adult female
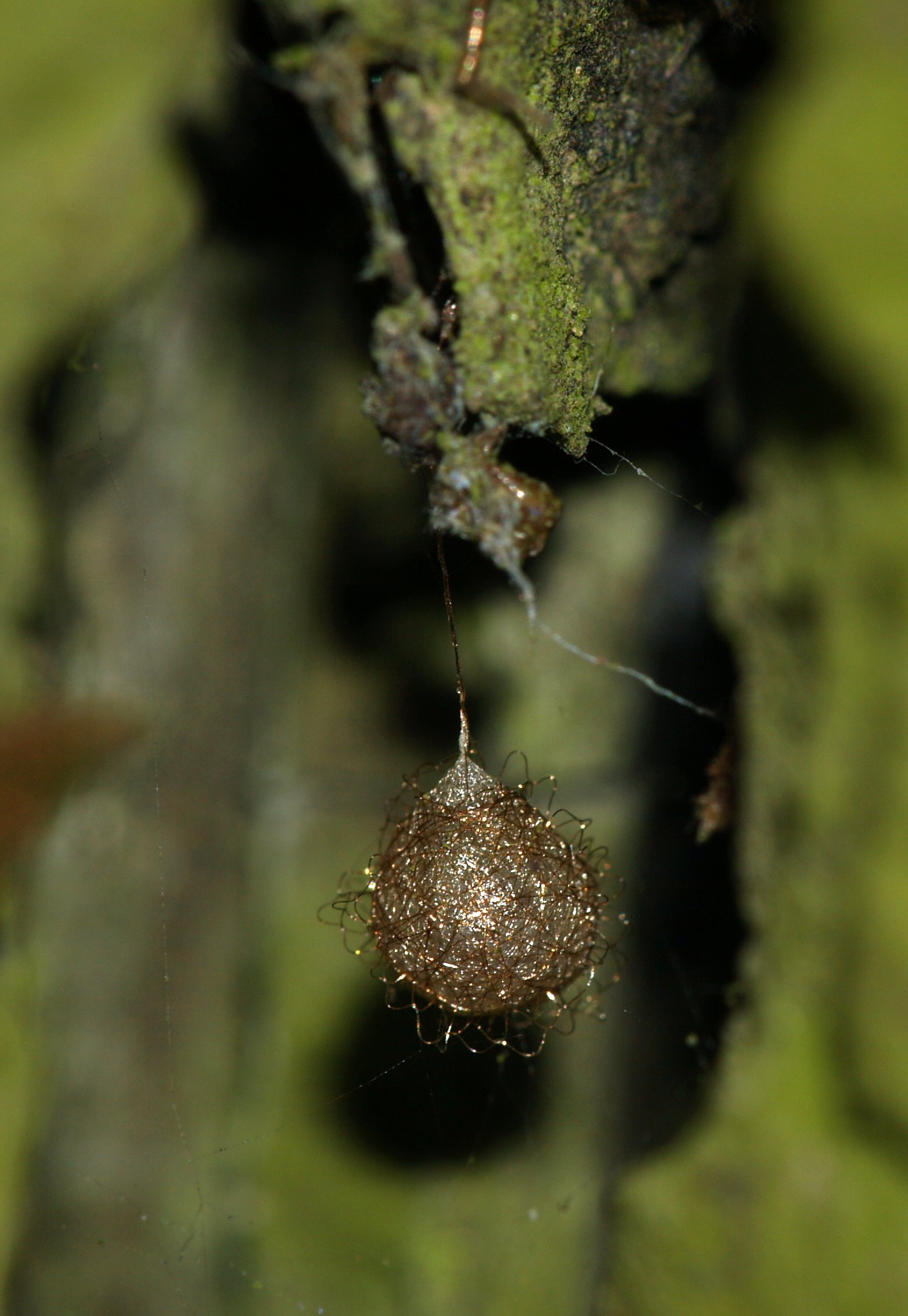
- Egg sac of Ero furcata, from a hole in a tree, Botanical Garden (Flora) of Cologne, Germany

Scientific classification
- Kingdom: Animalia
- Phylum: Arthropoda
- Subphylum: Chelicerata
- Class: Arachnida
- Order: Araneae
- Infraorder: Araneomorphae
- Family: Mimetidae
- Genus: Ero
- Species: E. furcata

Binomial name
- Ero furcata (Villers, 1789)

Synonyms
- Aranea furcata Villers, 1789; Ero thoracica (Wider, 1834); Ero variegata (Brullé, 1832); Theridion callens Blackwall, 1841; Theridion thoracicum Wider, 1834; Theridion variegatum Brullé, 1832

= Ero furcata =

Species of spider

Ero furcata is a pirate spider species with Palearctic distribution, being native from the Azores to Japan. It is notably also found in Ireland, Lithuania and the Czech Republic. It was first described by Villers in 1789 as Aranea furcata.
