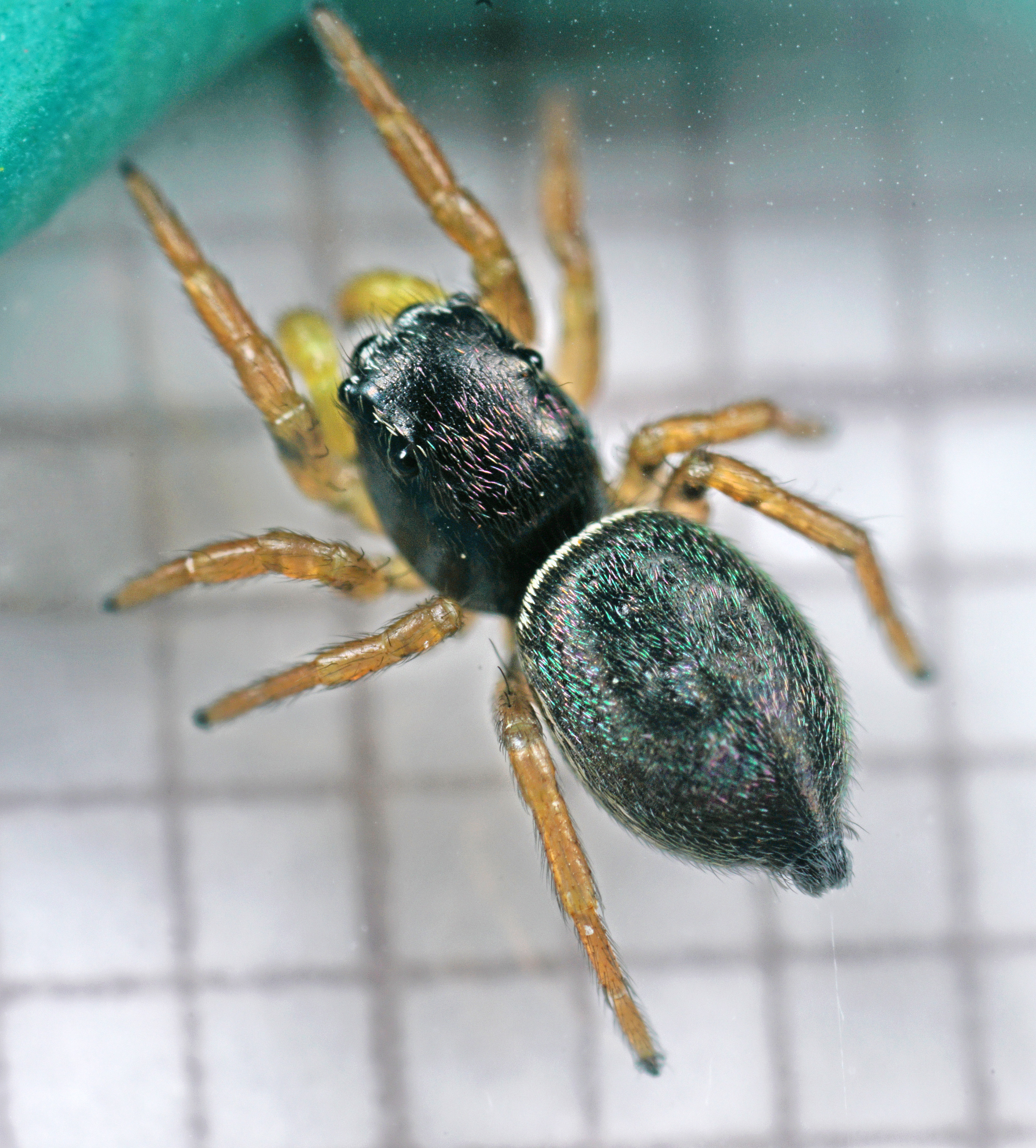
- female
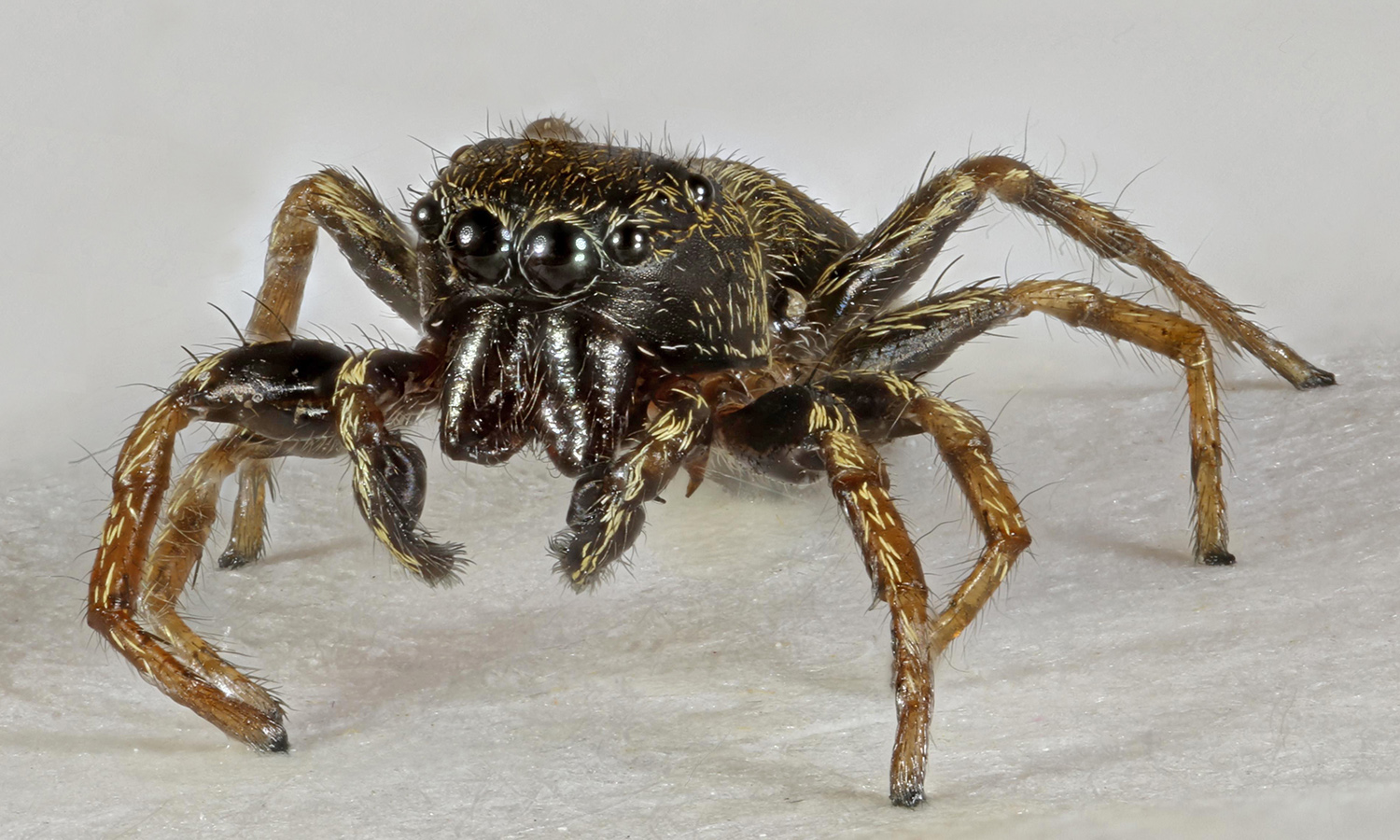
- male

Scientific classification
- Kingdom: Animalia
- Phylum: Arthropoda
- Subphylum: Chelicerata
- Class: Arachnida
- Order: Araneae
- Infraorder: Araneomorphae
- Family: Salticidae
- Genus: Heliophanus
- Species: H. flavipes

Binomial name
- Heliophanus flavipes (Hahn, 1832)

Synonyms
- Salticus flavipes Hahn, 1832; Heliophanus flavipes anglicus Simon, 1868; Heliophanus hecticus Simon, 1868; Heliophanus corsicus Simon, 1871; Heliophanus fulvignathus Simon, 1871

= Heliophanus flavipes =

Species of spider

Heliophanus flavipes is a species of jumping spider in the genus Heliophanus. It is found across Europe, Turkey, the Caucasus, Russia (from Europe to South Siberia), Kazakhstan, Iran, Central Asia, and China.

== Etymology ==
The species name flavipes is derived from Latin flavus meaning "yellow" and pes meaning "foot", referring to the characteristic yellow legs of this species.

== Taxonomy ==
The species was first described in 1832 by German arachnologist Carl Wilhelm Hahn as Salticus flavipes in his work "Die Arachniden". It was later transferred to the genus Heliophanus by Carl Ludwig Koch in 1846. Several synonyms have been established through taxonomic revisions, with the most recent comprehensive revision by Wesołowska in 1986 synonymizing Heliophanus corsicus Simon, 1871.

== Distribution ==
H. flavipes has been recorded from a vast range across the Palearctic region. In Europe, it is found from the British Isles and Scandinavia in the north to the Mediterranean countries in the south. The species extends eastward through Russia to South Siberia, and southward through the Caucasus region, Iran, and Central Asia to China, where it has been recorded from Xinjiang.

== Habitat ==
The species typically inhabits sunny, open areas including gardens, fields, hedgerows, and woodland clearings. Similar to H. cupreus, it is often found on or at the base of, low vegetation in a variety of situations.

== Description ==
female

female (variation)

male

=== Females ===
Adult females measure approximately 5.1 mm in body length. The carapace is blackish-brown and covered with white and yellow fine hairs that give it a metallic sheen. The head region is black and rectangular, occupying about two-fifths of the carapace length.

The chelicerae are black with two teeth on the front margin and one on the rear margin. The labium is triangular and blackish-brown. The legs are brownish with black markings and sparse white scale-like hairs, with the characteristic yellow coloration that gives the species its name.

The opisthosoma is black and oval-shaped, covered with white and yellow scale-like hairs that create a metallic appearance. The dorsal surface has a white stripe along the front edge and sides, with a "W"-shaped white marking at the rear end.

=== Males ===
Males are smaller than females, measuring approximately 4.0 mm in body length. The carapace is blackish-brown to black with numerous wrinkles and a metallic sheen, densely covered with grayish-black fine hairs and white scale-like hairs. The cephalic region is black and rectangular, occupying about one-third of the carapace length.

The pedipalps are reddish-brown to brownish-red.

The legs are brownish with black markings and pale hairs mixed with white scale-like hairs. The opisthosoma is oval with a pointed rear end, grayish-black on the dorsal surface without distinct markings, densely covered with white hairs.
