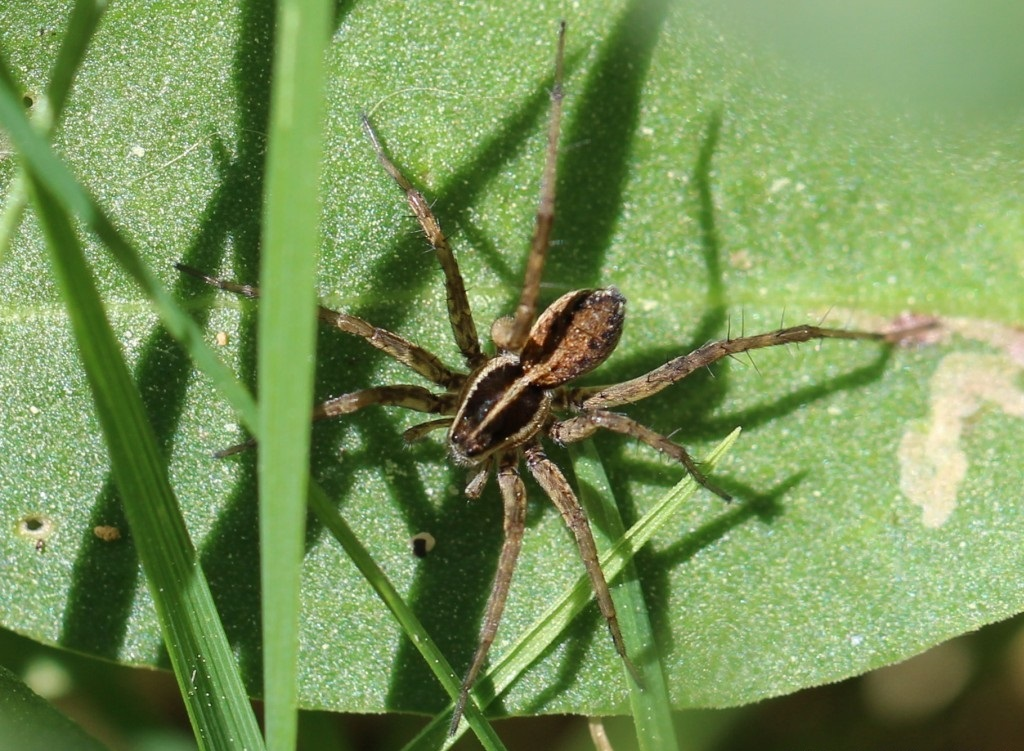

Scientific classification
- Kingdom: Animalia
- Phylum: Arthropoda
- Subphylum: Chelicerata
- Class: Arachnida
- Order: Araneae
- Infraorder: Araneomorphae
- Family: Lycosidae
- Genus: Pardosa
- Species: P. agrestis

Binomial name
- Pardosa agrestis Westring, 1861

= Pardosa agrestis =

Species of spider

Pardosa agrestis is a non-web-building spider in the family Lycosidae, commonly known as wolf spiders.

Pardosa agrestis have brown bodies with longitudinal bands. Females are slightly larger ranging from 6–9 mm, while males range from 4.5 to 7 mm. They are hard to distinguish from their related taxonomic species. P. agrestis is the most abundant spider in central European agricultural habitats, preferring to inhabit open spaces. Its lifespan is around 1–2 years and its diet consists mainly of other arthropods, exhibiting non-sexually cannibalistic behavior at times. It has a long copulation duration that averages around two hours. The two mating seasons are June and August, producing 40-60 spiderlings per cocoon. Pardosa agrestis do not spin webs and are venomous. They will chase after their prey and deliver bites using their chelicerae.

== Description ==
Pardosa agrestis has a dark brown body with longitudinal bands. It is hard to distinguish from its related species. Pardosa agrestis is characterized by the arrangement of its eyes. Its eight eyes are arranged so that there are four eyes in the front row and two eyes in each back row. There are minimal differences in size between sexes, females being slightly larger. Females range from 6–9 mm, while males range from 4.5 to 7 mm. The average female body size is representative of the abundance of resources in its habitat and also is positively correlated with fecundity.

== Habitat and distribution ==
=== Habitat ===
Pardosa agrestis prefers open habitats, specifically arable crop fields. Since Pardosa agrestis populates crop fields in high densities, it potentially plays a significant role as a control agent against insects and pests.

Because Pardosa agrestis inhabit agricultural areas, they frequently face decimation, subsequently rebuilding and recolonizing. Following decimation or disturbances, spiders of this species will recolonize in non-arable areas surrounding their original habitat. Therefore, the availability and quality of non-arable land around the spiders’ natural habitat plays a major role in the abundance of Pardosa agrestis in an arable field. Its population density is highest in farming fields that are a short distance away from long, wide, and grassy road-side strips.

Certain slow-maturing members of Pardosa agrestis are vulnerable during the winter months as they have not yet developed techniques and structures necessary to survive the winter. Presence of woody areas around the spiders’ main habitats provide shelter to overwintering spiders, increasing the likelihood of surviving through the winter by providing them with refuge and sufficient prey. Woody areas also provide shelter to females carrying egg sacs, resulting in enhanced offspring survival.

=== Distribution ===
Pardosa agrestis is the dominant surface-dwelling spider species in farming grounds in Central Europe and certain areas in North America and Asia.

== Diet ==
=== Prey variability ===
The diet of Pardosa agrestis consists exclusively of small arthropods such as diptera and aphids. The prey targeted is almost always smaller than the size of the spider itself. Pardosa agrestis is a generalist predator. It is not specific in the way it selects prey among the arthropods it predates. Its choice of prey heavily depends on the prey's size, frequency of collision, and encounter. This holds for small and medium-sized spiders. However, large spiders can also feed on larger hard-bodied insects. In the earliest stages of their lifecycle, the spiderlings will be protected by reproductive females; however, adult males and virgin females consume spiderlings as a part of their diet from time to time.

=== Sexual dimorphism of prey capture ===
Females without egg sacs have been observed to capture prey more than the males. This is attributed to their larger average size and the need to supply sufficient energy. However, egg-carrying females have significantly less prey capturing behavior.

=== Food scarcity ===
Pardosa agrestis regularly faces conditions of insufficient food and starvation. To combat this, it has evolved to be resistant to hunger and will masticate its food to compensate for the lack of prey captured, especially in the winter. It also compensates for its lack of food with its ability to capture multiple prey in one attempt. 40-50% of Pardosa agrestis’ diet is strongly masticated and thus are not readily identifiable. Because they are regularly in a scenario where there is insufficient food, these spiders need to extract as much energy from their food as possible. The spider chews down the hunted prey to a meat ball using their chelicerae, lengthening the digestion process and abstracting as many nutrients as possible.

== Reproduction ==
Pardosa agrestis has a widely distributed copulation duration ranging from a couple of seconds to several hours. For Pardosa agrestis, copulation often lasts more than two hours. Reproduction occurs most intensively during May and July to early August. They have multiple reproductive periods that result in coexisting offspring that have a wide size distribution. A typical female will have 40-60 spiderlings per cocoon and can produce multiple cocoons.

=== Fertilization ===
Although Pardosa agrestis copulates for an extended period of time, ten minutes of copulation is sufficient for fertilization in half of the cases. Forty minutes of copulation is needed for near-certain fertilization. Even when the extended copulation period was interrupted at ten minutes, the number and size of offspring, and the time the female took to produce an egg did not change. The egg sacs are visible 2–3 weeks after copulation occurs, regardless of the copulation duration.

=== Long copulation ===
The long copulation duration exhibited by Pardosa agrestis is costly for the spider. The spider spends a considerable amount of energy during copulation, misses opportunities to mate with others, and foregoes foraging resources. Long copulation in Pardosa agrestis occurs without hiding in a safe area, thus increasing the spider's vulnerability to predation. Aside from this, long copulation increases the probability of parasite infections. The exact reasoning for long copulation in Pardosa agrestis is unknown. However, it is hypothesized that long copulation could serve a role in overpowering other males’ sperm by releasing sperm for an extended period of time. Another hypothesis is that long copulation prevents other males from copulating with the female immediately after fertilization.

== Life cycle ==
The lifespan of Pardosa agrestis is around one year in Western and Central Europe but was recorded to go up to two years in more Northern regions. The life cycle can be divided into four stages: spiderlings (instar that leaves the cocoon), juveniles (in between spiderling and subadult), subadults (instar pre-adult stage), and adults. The population dynamics and numbers among these stages vary throughout the span of a year.

After winter, the population of juveniles increases significantly, along with a minor increase in subadult population. The population of subadults reaches its highest number in April. Adult females and males start appearing more in late April and peak in June, which is the first mating season for Pardosa agrestis. In late July, subadults peak again, leading to a peak of adults in August, explaining the second mating season. As a result, the number of spiderlings peak once again in September, and subadults peak in late Autumn. These population dynamics suggest a bimodal life pattern for Pardosa agrestis.

Some of the spiderlings born early in the summer will not mature until next spring (overwintering), whereas some will mature and reproduce within three months. This results in different cohorts within a population with different paces of life.

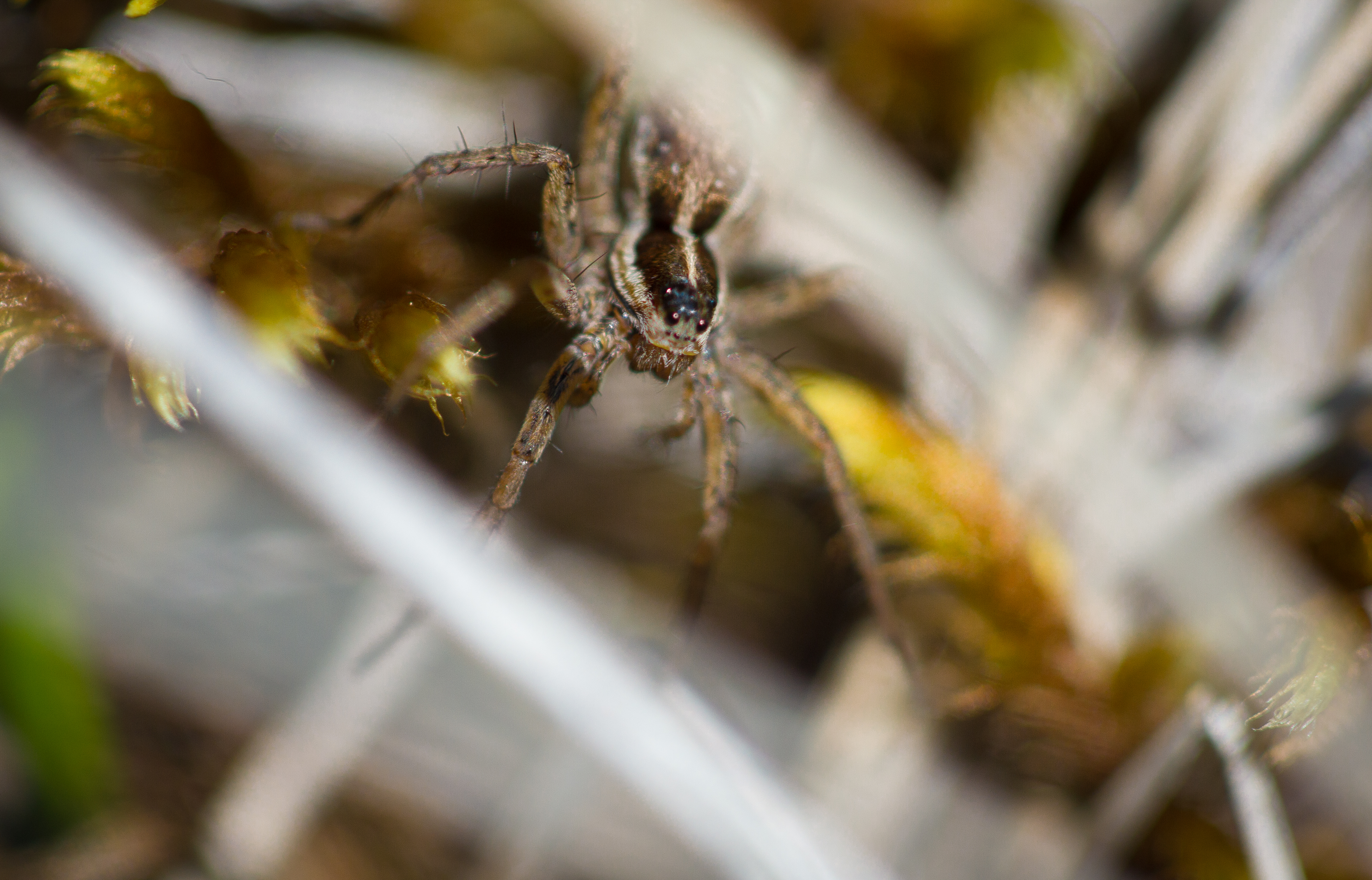
Unidentified Pardosa. Has common decorative striping pattern of P. agrestis

== Behavior ==
Pardosa agrestis engage in intricate display behavior and will have ritualized combative confrontations. Generally, neither of the interacting spiders are harmed, except for the case of cannibalistic behavior. They typically do not engage in territorial behavior and they tend to live in overlapping areas.

=== Behavioral Differences between Individuals with Differing Pace-of-life ===
Some spiderlings take close to a year to mature and reproduce, whereas others can take around 3 months. This creates two main groups of slow and rapidly developing spiders. Rapidly developing spiders tend to have a shorter life span. Spiders that have a slower development are seen to be less active when put in novel environments. Slow-developing spiders are also less likely to attack and capture a potential prey than rapidly developing individuals. Slowly developing spiders are also slower at emerging from safe spaces. Spiders that were rapidly developing are more active, have more hunting motivation and are bolder than those who develop slowly.

An advantage of developing rapidly is avoiding the high mortality rate of overwintering. A slowly developing spider will need to face the high mortality rate of surviving the winter as a non-adult. Another advantage is that rapidly developing spiders tend to have a larger adult size. On the other hand, rapidly developing spiders are disadvantaged because they have lower fecundity and will have less offspring.

=== Mating ===
Male Pardosa agrestis find females through the use of sexual chemical signals. It was found that certain pesticides found in today's agroecosystems can disturb their methods of chemical communication. Investigating their sexual communication methods, researchers used the glyphosate-based herbicide Roundup and the pyrethroid-based insecticide Nurelle D. They found that the male spiders' ability to find the females was based on following the female's dragline silk cues, not through airborne cues, and that using both of these treatments for 3 hours significantly disturbed the males' abilities to find the female dragline silk cues.

=== Recolonizing ===
As the Pardosa agrestis inhabit arable fields, they will have to relocate following a disruption of their habitat. Juvenile Pardosa agrestis spiders play the main role in recolonizing following a disruption of their habitat, as they have a greater range of movement when compared to adults, thanks to their ballooning ability. Larger instars and adults can only use cursorial movement, restricting their range. The juveniles will travel to a safe, non-arable area to regroup and recolonize.

=== Cannibalism ===
Pardosa agrestis exhibits non-sexual cannibalism. This process serves to strengthen the fitness of larger spiders when other nutrients are not in reach, and plays a role in population regulation. The factors that influence the possibility of cannibalistic activity is the size difference between predator and prey, and the hunger level of the predator. In instances where cannibalism occurs, the larger spider is almost always the cannibal. Cannibalism is most likely to occur between spiders in different life stages and sexes. In deciding whether to engage in cannibalistic behavior, handling time is an important determining factor. Handling time takes into account the size difference between the predator and prey, aiming to minimize retaliation risk and profitability of the interaction. Another important factor that contributes to the occurrence of cannibalistic behavior in Pardosa agrestis is encounter frequency. This variable depends on how densely populated an area is and movement behaviors of individual spiders.

Young spiders do not possess the reserves necessary to survive food shortages. Therefore, young spiders are more willing to take risks and engage in cannibalistic activities among each other more frequently.

On the other hand, cannibalism has its costs on the species. The killing of a conspecific spider leads to a reduction of the inclusive fitness of the cannibalistic individual. This behavior also adds to the risk of pathogen or parasite transmission among spiders from the same species. During the act of cannibalism, the spider will have to face a prey that contains similar predatory mechanisms, which increases the chance of retribution. Also, if a hungry spider has limited access to resources, it will be more prone to cannibalize, resulting in it attacking larger prey and increasing its chances of getting injured or killed.

== Webs ==
Pardosa agrestis do not weave webs, but instead will chase their prey in order to capture them.

== Venom ==
Pardosa agrestis is venomous but will not bite or attack humans unless threatened or has egg sacs around. Its bite might cause an allergic reaction or minor pain.
