= Podothrombiidae =

Scientific classification
- Kingdom: Animalia
- Phylum: Arthropoda
- Subphylum: Chelicerata
- Class: Arachnida
- Order: Trombidiformes
- Family: Podothrombiidae; Thor, 1935

Family of mites

Podothrombiidae is a family of mites belonging to the order Trombidiformes.

Genera:

- Podothrombium Berlese
