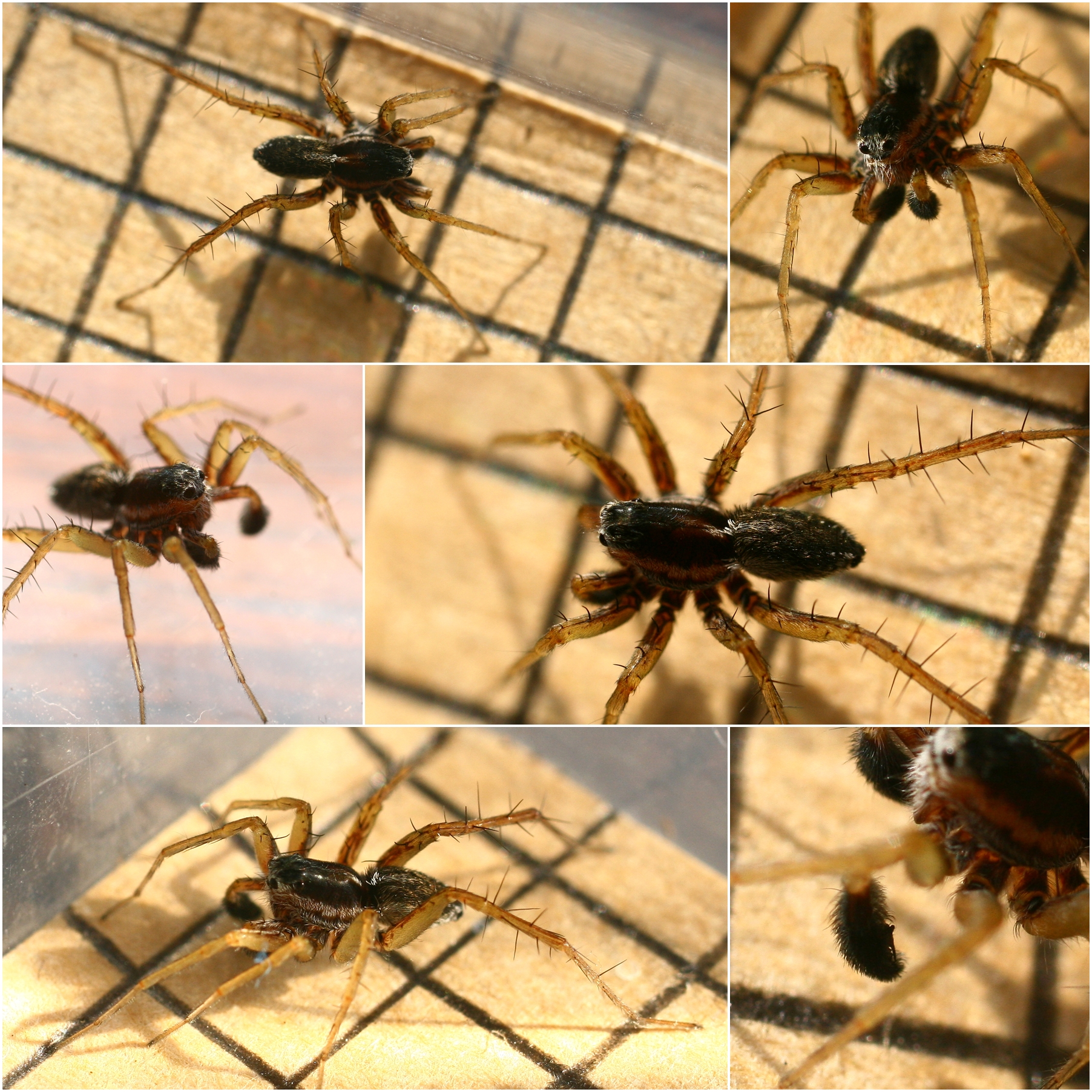

Scientific classification
- Kingdom: Animalia
- Phylum: Arthropoda
- Subphylum: Chelicerata
- Class: Arachnida
- Order: Araneae
- Infraorder: Araneomorphae
- Family: Lycosidae
- Genus: Pardosa
- Species: P. nigriceps

Binomial name
- Pardosa nigriceps Thorell, 1856

= Pardosa nigriceps =

Species of spider

Pardosa nigriceps is a species of wolf spider in the family Lycosidae. This European spider is common on heaths and open spaces where there is low vegetation and bushes. The males have characteristically black palps due to a thick covering of hair. Males are 4-5mm in size the females are bigger at 5-7mm with a larger abdomen.
