= Oxidae =

Scientific classification
- Kingdom: Animalia
- Phylum: Arthropoda
- Subphylum: Chelicerata
- Class: Arachnida
- Order: Trombidiformes
- Superfamily: Lebertioidea
- Family: Oxidae; Viets, 1926

Family of mites

Oxidae is a family of prostigs in the order Trombidiformes. There are at least 4 genera and about 15 described species in Oxidae.

== Genera ==
- Flabellifrontipoda
- Frontipoda Koenike, 1891
- Gnaphiscus Koenike, 1898
- Oxus Kramer, 1877
