= Teutoniidae =

Teutonia

Scientific classification
- Domain: Eukaryota
- Kingdom: Animalia
- Phylum: Arthropoda
- Subphylum: Chelicerata
- Class: Arachnida
- Order: Trombidiformes
- Family: Teutoniidae
- Genus: Teutonia; Koenike, 1889

Extant species
- Teutonia cometes; Teutonia lunata

Synonyms
- Teutonidae

Family of arachnids

Teutonia is a genus of mites belonging to the monotypic family Teutoniidae.

The genus was described in 1889 by Koenike.

The species of this genus are found in Europe.

Species:

- Teutonia cometes (Koch, 1837)
- Teutonia lunata Marshall, 1924
