= Scutoverticidae =

Scutoverticidae Temporal range: Cretaceous–present

Scientific classification
- Kingdom: Animalia
- Phylum: Arthropoda
- Subphylum: Chelicerata
- Class: Arachnida
- Order: Oribatida
- Superfamily: Licneremaeoidea
- Family: Scutoverticidae; Grandjean, 1954

Family of mites

Scutoverticidae is a family of oribatids in the order Oribatida. There are about 8 genera and at least 50 described species in Scutoverticidae.

== Genera ==
- Arthrovertex Balogh, 1970
- Ethiovertex Mahunka, 1982
- Exochocepheus Woolley & Higgins, 1968
- Hypovertex Krivolutsky, 1969
- Lamellovertex Bernini, 1976
- Provertex Mihelcic, 1959
- Scutovertex Michael, 1879
- Scutoverticosus Kok, 1968
