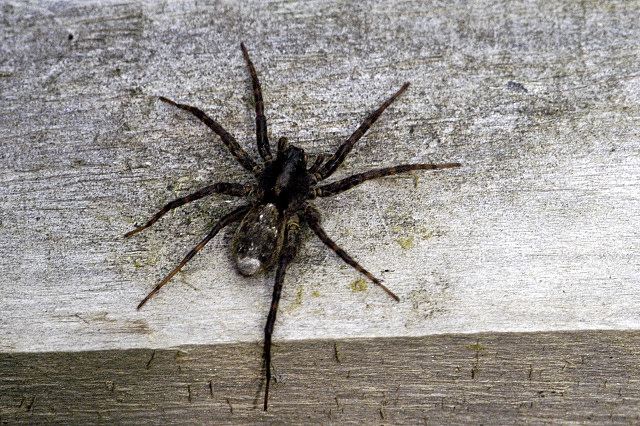

Scientific classification
- Kingdom: Animalia
- Phylum: Arthropoda
- Subphylum: Chelicerata
- Class: Arachnida
- Order: Araneae
- Infraorder: Araneomorphae
- Family: Lycosidae
- Genus: Pardosa
- Species: P. pullata

Binomial name
- Pardosa pullata (Clerck, 1757)

= Pardosa pullata =

Species of spider

Pardosa pullata is a species of spiders from genus Pardosa in the family Lycosidae. It was described by Clerck, in 1757.

== Habitat ==
The species occurs in open habitats, such as grasslands, heathlands, woodland clearings, dunes, old quarries, and roadside edges. It also occurs in wet habitats, such as dyke edges, damp meadows, water borders, and swampy areas. It commonly co-occurs with ''Pardosa prativaga''.

The species typically prefers colder climates and elevations up to 2000 m.

== Description ==
Spiders of the species possess a red-brown carapace with a lighter median band that narrows towards the posterior. The tarsi are yellow. Males are generally darker in coloration, sometimes with lateral bands on the carapace. Females generally range from between 4-6mm in body length, while males range from between 4-5mm.

== Subspecies ==
Pardosa pullata has a subspecies:

- Pardosa pullata jugorum
