= Wildlife of the Isle of Man =

This is a list of the known wildlife of the Isle of Man.

Key to symbols
*	non-native species
†	extinct species
?	species of uncertain status

Each listing follows the following format: English name (where one exists), binomial/trinomial scientific name with authorities for uncommon species, Manx name (where one exists), status.

== Amphibia (amphibians) ==
=== Salamandridae (salamanders and newts) ===
- Great crested newt, Triturus cristatus (jolgan-leaghyr-beg) *
- Smooth newt, Triturus vulgaris (jolgan-leaghyr-beg) *
- Palmate newt, Triturus helveticus (jolgan-leaghyr-beg) *

=== Anura (frogs and toads) ===
- Common toad, Bufo bufo (beayf) *
- Common frog, Rana temporaria (rannag)

== Aves (birds) ==
=== Gaviidae (divers) ===
- Red-throated diver, Gavia stellata
- Black-throated diver, Gavia arctica
- Great northern diver, Gavia immer

=== Podicipedidae (grebes) ===
- Little grebe, Tachybaptus ruficollis
- Slavonian grebe, Podiceps auritus (eean kereen cleayshagh)

=== Hydrobatidae (petrels) ===
- Storm petrel, Hydrobates pelagicus (kitty varrey)

=== Procellariidae (shearwaters) ===
- Manx shearwater, Puffinus puffinus (scraayl)
- Fulmar, Fulmarus glacialis (eean croymmagh)

=== Sulidae (gannets and boobies) ===
- Gannet, Morus bassanus (gant)

=== Phalacrocoracidae (cormorants) ===
- Cormorant, Phalacrocorax carbo (fannag)
- Shag, Phalacrocorax aristotelis (fannag)

=== Ardeidae (egrets and herons) ===
- Bittern, Botaurus stellaris †
- Grey heron, Ardea cinerea (coayr ny hastan)

=== Anatidae (swans, geese and ducks) ===
- Mute swan, Cygnus olor
- Whooper swan, Cygnus cygnus
- Pink-footed goose, Anser brachyrynchus
- Greylag goose, Anser anser (guiy feie)
- Canada goose, Branta canadensis *
- Brent goose, Branta bernicla
- Shelduck, Tadorna tadorna (thunnag y scape)
- Wigeon, Anas penelope (thunnag veg feie)
- Gadwall, Anas strepera (laagh ghlass)
- Teal, Anas crecca (laagh laaghag)
- Mallard, Anas platyrhynchos (thunnag feie)
- Shoveler, Anas clypeata (thunnag ny sleryst)
- Pochard, Aythya ferina (kione mollagh)
- Tufted duck, Aythya fuligula (thunnag happagh)
- Scaup, Aythya marila (thunnag varrey)
- Eider, Somateria mollissima (laagh loughlinagh)
- Long-tailed duck, Clangula hyemalis (laagh lheeah)
- Common scoter, Melanitta nigra
- Velvet scoter, Melanitta fusca
- Goldeneye, Bucephala clangula (laaghag hooillagh)
- Red-breasted merganser, Mergus serrator (thunnag cleeau yiarg)
- Goosander, Mergus merganser (laagh eeacklagh)
- Ruddy duck, Oxyura jamaicensis † *

=== Accipitridae (hawks, eagles, kites and harriers) ===
- Sparrowhawk, Accipiter nisus
- Hen harrier, Circus cyaneus
- White-tailed eagle, Haliaeetus albicilla †

=== Falconidae (falcons) ===
- Kestrel, Falco tinnunculus
- Merlin, Falco columbarius
- Peregrine, Falco peregrinus

=== Phasianidae (partridges and quail) ===
- Red-legged partridge, Alectoris rufa *
- Grey partridge, Perdix perdix (kiark rennee) † *
- Quail, Coturnix coturnix (eean feie)

=== Tetraonidae (grouse) ===
- Black grouse, Tetrao tetrix † (extinct, native status uncertain but an introduced population is extinct)
- Red grouse, Lagopus lagopus scoticus † (native, extinct by 1835, reintroduced 1880 and still extant) (kellagh ruy / kiark freoaie – heath hen).

=== Phasianidae (pheasants) ===
- Pheasant, Phasianus colchicus *

=== Rallidae (rails and crakes) ===
- Water rail, Rallus aquaticus
- Corncrake, Crex crex (eean raip) †
- Coot, Fulica atra

=== Haematopodidae (oystercatchers) ===
- Oystercatcher, Haematopus ostralegus

=== Scolopacidae (waders) ===
- Curlew, Numenius arguata

=== Scolopacidae (woodcock and snipe) ===
- Woodcock, Scolopax rusticola
- Snipe, Gallinago gallinago

=== Laridae (gulls) ===
- Herring gull, Larsus argentatus (foillan)
- Great black-backed gull, Larsus marinus (juan mooar)

=== Alcidae (auks) ===
- Great auk, Pinguinus impennis †
- Puffin, Fratercula arctica
- Razorbill, Alca torda

=== Columbidae (pigeons) ===
- Woodpigeon, Columba palumbus
- Collared dove, Streptopelia decaocto
- Feral Pigeon/Rock dove, Columba livia

=== Tytonidae (barn owls) ===
- Barn owl, Tyto alba

=== Strigidae (other owls) ===
- Tawny owl, Strix aluco † (bred once)
- Long-eared owl, Asio otus
- Short-eared owl, Asio flammeus

=== Hirundinidae (swallows) ===
- Swallow, Hirundo rustica

=== Motacillidae (wagtails) ===
- Grey wagtail, Motacilla cinerea
- Pied wagtail, Motacilla alba yarrellii

=== Troglodytidae (wrens) ===
- Wren, Troglodytes troglodytes (drean)

=== Prunellidae (dunnock) ===
- Dunnock, Prunella modularis

=== Turdidae (thrushes) ===
- Robin, Erithacus rubecula
- Blackbird, Turdus merula (lhondoo)
- Song thrush, Turdus philomelos

=== Sylviidae (warblers) ===
- Willow warbler, Phylloscopus trochilus
- Goldcrest, Regulus regulus

=== Paridae (tits) ===
- Blue tit, Parus caeruleus (drean gorrym)
- Great tit, Parus major (drean mooar)
- Coal tit, Parus ater (drean kione doo)
- Long-tailed tit, Aegithalos caudatus

=== Sturnidae (starlings) ===
- Starling, Sturnus vulgaris

=== Corvidae (corvids) ===
- Magpie, Pica pica
- Jackdaw, Corvus monedula
- Raven, Corvus corax
- Carrion crow, Corvus corax
- Hooded crow, Corvus cornix
- Chough, Phyrocorrax phyrocorrax (caaig)
- Rook, Corvus frugilegus

=== Passeridae (sparrows) ===
- House sparrow, Passer domesticus

=== Fringillidae (finches) ===
- Common chaffinch, Fringilla coelebs
- Goldfinch, Carduelis chloris
- Greenfinch, Carduelis chloris

=== Emberizidae (buntings) ===
- Corn bunting, Miliaria calandra †

== Insecta (insects) ==
=== Neuroptera (lacewings) ===
- Chrysops vulgaris
- Chrysops ventralis
- Hemerobius lutescens
- Micromus veriegatus

=== Trichoptera (caddisflies) ===
- Limnophilus auricula
- Limnophilus flavicornis
- Limnophilus elegans

=== Odonata (dragonflies and damselflies) ===
Updated July 2023

- Common hawker, Aeshna juncea
- Brown hawker, Aeshna grandis
- Migrant hawker, Aeshna mixta - recent arrival, thought to be breeding (2022) at around seven sites
- Common darter, Sympetrum striolatum
- Black darter, Sympetrum danae - possibly endangered by drier springs drying out its upland pools
- Red-veined darter, Sympetrum fonscolombi
- Ruddy darter, Sympetrum sanguineum
- Four-spotted chaser, Libellula quadrimaculata
- Black-tailed skimmer, Orthetrum cancellatum - single photo record
- Emperor dragonfly, Anax imperator - recent arrival
- Lesser emperor dragonfly, Anax parthenope - recent arrival
- Vagrant emperor dragonfly, Anax ephippiger
- Common blue damselfly, Enallagma cyathigerum
- Blue-tailed damselfly, Ischnura elegans
- Large red damselfly, Pyrrhosoma nymphula
- Emerald damselfly, Lestes sponsa
- Azure damselfly, Coenagrion puella - thought extinct as it was recorded in just two years from Poyll Dhooie, Ramsey but refound at Ballaugh Plantation/Glen Shoggle on 10 June 2023.

=== Orthoptera (grasshoppers and crickets) ===
- Dark bush-cricket, Pholidoptera griseoaptera - Found only on the Lonan coast and around the Glen Maye ASSI - protected under Schedule 5 of the Wildlife Act 1990
- Speckled bush-cricket, Leptophyes punctatissima - Found only along south coast, including Glen Chass, Port St. Mary and in the west at Glen Maye ASSI - protected under Schedule 5 of the Wildlife Act 1990
- Lesser mottled grasshopper, Stenobothrus stigmaticus - Found only on the Langness ASSI, the only locality in the British Isles - protected under Schedule 5 of the Wildlife Act 1990
- Common green grasshopper, Omocestus viridulus - common
- Mottled grasshopper, Myrmeleotettix maculatus
- Field grasshopper, Chorthippus brunneus
- Common ground-hopper, Tetrix undulata

=== Dermaptera (earwigs) ===
- Common earwig, Forficula auricularia

=== Diptera (true flies) ===
- Bibio marci
- Bibio reticulatus
- Bombylius canescens
- Bombylius minor, heath bee-fly, a protected species. Current (2022) British Isles distribution seems to be limited to the Dorset heaths and the north coast of the Isle of Man at the Ayres, the Phurt (Ramsey) and the Lhen
- Calliphora vomitoria
- Cheilosia rosarum
- Machimus cowini, Manx robber fly

=== Coleoptera (beetles) ===
- Harmonia axyridis, harlequin ladybird
- Coccinella septempunctata, seven-spot ladybird
- Pterostichus madidus, black clock beetle
- Propylea quatuordecimpunctata, fourteen-spot ladybird
- Halyzia sedecimguttata, orange ladybird
- Harpalus affinis, metallic harpalus
- Calvia quatuordecimguttata, cream-spot ladybird
- Adalia bipunctata, two-spot ladybird
- Adalia decempunctata, ten-spot ladybird
- Otiorhynchus sulcatus, black vine beetle
- Rhagonycha fulva, common red soldier beetle
- Anoplotrupes stercorosus, woodland dor beetle
- Polydrusus formosus, green immigrant leaf weevil
- Cicindela campestris, green tiger beetle
- Anomala dubia, dune chafer
- Typhaeus typhoeus, minotaur beetle
- Phosphuga atrata, black snail beetle
- Teuchestes fossor, gravedigger dung beetle

=== Hymenoptera (bees, wasps and ants) ===
- Agrothereutes abbreviata
- Andrena clarkella
- Andrena denticulata
- Andrena labilis
- Bombus agrorum
- Bombus lucorum
- Bombus muscorum
- Crabo cribarius
- Dolerus liogaster
- Dolerus cothurnatus
- Halictus calceatus
- Lissonata bellator
- Myrmica ruginodis
- Parabates cristatus
- Pontania viminalis
- Psythyrus campestris
- Spilichneumon occisorius
- Trichoma enecator
- Vespa crabro, European hornet, rare on the island

=== Lepidoptera (butterflies and moths) ===
As of 2023 the Isle of Man has 20 regularly occurring migrant and resident species of butterfly, with a total of 23 all-time records in the wild.

==== Pieridae (whites) ====
- Large white, Pieris brassicae (fairly common resident)
- Small white, Pieris rapae (common resident)
- Green-veined white, Pieris napi (common resident)
- Orange tip, Anthocharis cardamines (fairly common resident)
- Clouded yellow, Colias croceus (irregular migrant - an immigration occurring in 1947 and 2025 107 records of NBN Atlas Isle of Man as of May 2022)
- Brimstone, Gonepteryx rhamni (very rare migrant)

==== Lycaenidae (blues and coppers) ====
- Small copper, Lycaena phlaeas (common resident)
- Common blue, Polyommatus icarus (common resident)
- Holly blue, Celastrina argiolus (fairly common and widespread resident)

==== Satyridae (browns) ====
- Grayling, Hipparchia semele (residential restricted to grassy, rocky cliffs and the Ayres - 355 records of NBN Atlas Isle of Man as of May 2022)
- Speckled wood, Pararge aegeria (recent coloniser, since 2005 on the east coast, reaching the west coast by 2009, now very common and widespread)
- Meadow brown, Maniola jurtina (common and widespread resident)
- Wall, Lasiommata megera (relatively common and widespread but in reduced number)
- Small heath, Coenonympha pamphilus (common and widespread, particularly on rabbit-grazed coastal grassland an in uplands)

==== Nymphalidae (fritillaries and aristocrats) ====
- Dark green fritillary, Speyeria aglaja (widespread resident along Manx coast but local. Inland population at Sulby Glen)
- Red admiral, Vanessa atalanta (common annual migrant)
- Small tortoiseshell, Aglais urticae (widespread and common, but declining)
- Peacock, Aglais io (fairly common resident)
- Comma, Polygonia c-album (fairly recent coloniser, since 1990s, local, mainly in north - rare)
- Painted lady, Vanessa cardui (annual migrant)
- Ringlet, Aphantopus hyperantus (extremely rare vagrant - NBN Atlas Isle of Man contains only a single record from 1937 in Peel)
- Scotch argus, Erebia aethiops (extremely rare vagrant)
- Monarch butterfly, Danaus plexippus (extremely rare vagrant - four records of NBN Atlas Isle of Man as of May 2022)

==== Crambidae (grass moths) ====
- Scarce crimson and gold moth, Pyrausta sanguinalis, a small distinctively marked moth, dark yellow with crimson bands across the forewings merging with crimson edging. It is scarce and local in the British Isles and appears to be confined to areas of Northern Ireland, the Burren in the Republic of Ireland and the Isle of Man. Here, it is only found along the northern coast at the Ayres National Nature Reserve, where its larvae live in silken tubes and feed on the flowers of wild thyme growing in the former sand pits. At the Ayres adults fly during the day mostly in June but have been recorded in July and into early August. The species was once more widespread in Britain but has declined in recent years and is thought to be extinct in its former range in north-west England and Scotland.

==== Arctiidae (woolly worm moths) ====
- Cinnabar moth, Tyria jacobaeae

==== Geometridae (geometers) ====
- Peppered moth, Biston betularia
- Garden carpet, Xanthorhoe fluctuata
- Silver ground carpet, Xanthorhoe montanata montanata

==== Sphingidae (hawkmoths) ====
- Elephant hawkmoth, Deilephila elpenor
- Death's head hawkmoth, Acherontia atropos

==== Notodontidae (prominent moths) ====
- Puss moth, Cerura vinula

==== Noctuidae (noctuids) ====
- Silver Y, Autographa gamma f. gammina
- Ingrailed clay, Diarsia mendica mendica

=== Hemiptera (true bugs) ===
- Acanthosoma haemorrhoidale (hawthorn shield bug)
- Capsus meriopterus (a broom myrid)
- Corixa praeusta (a water boatman)
- Gerris lacustris (common pondskater)
- Hydrometra stagnorum (water-measurer)
- Myzus cerasi
- Peizodorus lituratus
- Plagiognathus arbustorum
- Sybsigara fossarum
- Subsigara scotti
- Velua currens

== Mammalia (mammals) ==
=== Chiroptera (bats) ===
As of 2020 research by the Manx Bat Group has found that there are at least nine species of Chiroptera on the Isle of Man:

- Common pipistrelle, Pipistrellus pipistrellus (craitnag)
- Whiskered bat, Myotis mystacinus
- Natterer's bat, Myotis nattereri
- Daubenton's bat, Myotis daubentonii
- Leisler's bat, Nyctalus leisleri (first recorded in 1990)
- Soprano pipistrelle, Pipistrellus pygmaeus
- Brown long-eared bat, Plecotus auritus (chleayshagh)
- Nathusius's pipistrelle, Pipistrellus nathusii
- Lesser horseshoe bat, Rhinolophus hipposideros

=== Lagomorpha (rabbits and hares) ===
- Mountain hare, Lepus timidus † * (mwaagh slieu), once extinct but now reintroduced, found only on the Northern Hills
- European hare, Lepus europaeus * (mwaagh dhone), uncertain if introduced, found locally across the Isle of Man but not the Calf of Man
- European rabbit, Oryctolagus cuniculus * (conning), found across the Island and on the Calf of Man in good numbers

=== Insectivora (insect-eaters) ===
- European hedgehog, Erinaceus europaeus * (arkan sonney), accidental introduction from a shipwreck
- Pygmy shrew, Sorex minutus (thollag airhey), the common shrew is not found in the Isle of Man as commonly thought. Also found on the Calf of Man.

=== Rodentia (rodents) ===
- Wood mouse, Apodemus sylvaticus (lugh faiyr), formerly found on the Calf of Man.
- House mouse, Mus domesticus * (lugh thie), not present on the Calf of Man.
- Brown rat, Rattus norvegicus * (roddan dhone), invasive non-native species formerly found on the Calf of Man.

=== Carnivora (carnivores) ===
- Stoat, Mustela erminea hibernica (assag, known as a 'weasel' in the Manx English dialect
- Ferret, Mustela furo * (kayt ny giark), invasive non-native species known as polecats but really just feral ferrets
- Cat, Felis catus * (kayt), invasive non-native species with a widely established feral population

=== Cervidae (deer) ===
- Irish elk, Megaloceros giganteus (feeaih mooar) † globally extinct.

=== Pinnipedia (seals and walruses) ===
- Grey seal, Halichoerus grypus (raun glass)
- Common seal, Phoca vitulina (raun), occasional, not known to breed.

=== Artiodactyla (even-toed ungulates or hoofed mammals) ===
- Feral domestic goat, Capra hircus * (goayr), a 2024 study found 245 feral individuals on the Island's east coast
- Feral domestic sheep, Ovis aries *, as of 2025 approximately 25 or more feral Manx Loaghtan sheep are present in an unmanaged apparently self-sustaining population along the coast of the Meayll peninsula on the Manx National Heritage owned cliffs and brooghs from the Chasms westward to Spanish Head.

=== Perissodactyla (odd-toed ungulates) ===
- Horse, Equus ferus caballus, feral herd formerly on the Dreeym Geeill moorland above Glen Auldyn, with a single remaining individual as of August 2025. This was removed by the original owner of the animal in winter 2025/6.

=== Marsupialia (marsupials) ===
- Red-necked wallaby, Macropus rufogriseus * (myn-changaroo), a 2024 study found between 950-1050 feral individuals across the island

=== Cetacea (whales and dolphins) ===
Note that Manx nomenclature traditionally did not differentiate between species. Most whales are known as muc varrey (sea pigs) or perkin mooar and small dolphins as doraid.

==== Regularly seen species ====
- Harbour porpoise, Phocoena phocoena (perkin/perkyn chadjin)
- Bottlenose dolphin, Tursiops truncatus (lheimmeyder mooar-tronnagh)
- Common dolphin, Delphinus delphis (doraid/lheimmeyder cadjin giare-ghobbagh)
- Risso's dolphin, Grampus griseus (lheimmeyder marrey garroo)
- Minke whale, Balaenoptera acutorostrata (muc-varrey ny maaigyn bane)

==== Rarely seen species ====
- Humpback whale, Megaptera novaeangliae
- Killer whale, Orcinus orca
- Fin whale, Balaenoptera physalus
- White-beaked dolphin, Lagenorhynchus albirostris (filmed off Fort Island on 14 August 2022)

==== Vagrant species ====
- Sei whale, Balaenoptera borealis – a single adult was stranded on Langness in May 1925. Its skeleton is on display in the Natural History Gallery of the Manx Museum
- Long-finned pilot whale, Globicephala melas – no known records in Manx waters, but have been sighted in the Irish Sea
- Striped dolphin, Stenella coeruleoalba - on 20 December 2017 a single striped dolphin beached and died in Castletown harbour and was preserved for display within the Manx Museum

==== Extinct populations ====
- Grey whale, Eschrichtius robustus – a coastal whale probably once found in the Irish Sea, however the species' North Atlantic population was extirpated in the 18th century.

=== Domestic animals ===
All sorts of domesticated species have been brought to the Isle of Man by humans over the millennia. Two notable landrace breeds have evolved distinctively on the island:

- Manx cat, a domestic cat (Felis catus) with genetic abbreviation of the tail, which may range from no tail at all to essentially full-size. Developed as a standardised breed in the late 19th century, the Manx cat has become a popular breed worldwide, but is in danger of disappearing on the island itself, as it is being out-bred by other cats imported over the last century by primarily English immigrants. The long-haired variety is called the Cymric cat in some breed registries, and was primarily developed in Canada, not the Isle of Man.
- Manx Loaghtan, a variety of domestic sheep (Ovis aries) with brown wool and four horns, rare outside the island and considered "at risk" by the Rare Breeds Survival Trust.

== Mollusca (molluscs) ==
- Aplexa hypnorum
- Carychium minimum
- Columella edentula
- Stagnicola palustris
- Radix peregra
- Galba truncatula
- Physa fontinalis
- Pisidium hibernicum
- Pisidium milium
- Pisidium nitidum
- Pisidium obtusale
- Pisidium pusillum
- Pisidium subtruncatum
- Gyraulus albus
- Bathyomphalus contortus
- Anisus spirorbis
- Punctum pygmaeum
- Sphaerium corneum
- Valvata piscinalis
- Vertigo antivertigo
- Anodonta anatina (duck mussel)

=== Gastropoda (gastropods) ===
==== Stylommatophora (common land snails and slugs) ====
- Limacus maculatus (green cellar slug)
- Limax cinereoniger (ash-black slug) found in remnant ancient woodland in 2011 after not being recorded for over 100 years.
- Cornu aspersum (garden snail)
- Cepaea nemoralis (brown-lipped snail)
- Cepaea hortensis (White-lipped snail)

==== Order Trochida ====
- Jujubinus striatus (grooved topshell) recorded in the Langness Marine Nature Reserve in 2019; the first Manx record since Edward Forbes recorded it in 1838.

== Reptilia (reptiles) ==
- Common lizard, Zootoca vivipara (jolgan-leaghyr)
- Sand lizard, Lacerta agilis

== Chondrichthyes (cartilagenous fish) ==
- Basking shark, Cetorhinus maximus (sharkagh souree)

== Lamprey ==
- Brook lamprey, Lampetra planeri
- River lamprey, Lampetra fluviatilis
- Sea lamprey, Petromyzon marinus

== Osteichthyes (bony fish) ==
- Brown trout, Salmo trutta including the anadromous form, the sea trout
- Rainbow trout, Oncorhynchus mykiss *
- Atlantic salmon, Salmo salar
- Ocean sunfish, Mola mola (recent vagrant)
- Swordfish, Xiphias gladius (rare vagrant, single record on 27 August 2022)
- European eel, Anguilla anguilla
- Minnow, Phoxinus phoxinus
- Three-spined stickleback, Gasterosteus aculeatus
- Nine-spined stickleback, Pungitius pungitius

== Arthropoda (arthropods) ==
The format here is common English name (if one exists), followed by scientific name, followed by authority in brackets. There are no Manx names.

=== Arachnida (spiders) ===
218 species of Arachnids have been identified in the Isle of Man as of 1 January 2002.

==== Pholcidae ====
- Pholcus phalangioides (Fuesslin)

==== Segestriidae ====
- Segestria senoculata (Linnaeus)

==== Dysderidae ====
- Dysdera erythrina (Walckenaer)
- Dysdera crocata (C.L. Koch)
- Harpactea hombergi (Scopoli)

==== Oonopidae ====
- Oonops pulcher Templeton

==== Mimetidae ====
- Ero cambridgei (Kulczynski)
- Ero furcata (Villers)

==== Nesticidae ====
- Nesticus cellulanus (Clerck)

==== Theridiidae ====
- Episinus angulatus (Blackwall)
- Dipoena inornata (O.P.-Cambridge)
- Steatoda phalerata (Panzer)
- Steatoda bipunctata (Linnaeus)
- Theridion sisyphium (Clerck)
- Theridion melanurum (Hahn)
- Theridion mystaceum (L. Koch)
- Paidiscura pallens (Blackwall)
- Enoplognatha ovata (Clerck)
- Enoplognatha thoracica (Hahn)
- Robertus lividus (Blackwall)
- Robertus arundineti (O.P.-Cambridge)
- Pholcomma gibbum (Westring)

==== Linyphiidae ====
- Ceratinella brevipes (Westring)
- Ceratinella brevis (Wider)
- Ceratinella scabrosa (O.P.-Cambridge)
- Walckenaeria acuminata (Blackwall)
- Walckenaeria antica (Wider)
- Walckenaeria nodosa (O.P.-Cambridge)
- Walckenaeria nudipalpis (Westring)
- Walckenaeria monoceros (Wider)
- Walckenaeria unicornis (O.P.-Cambridge)
- Walckenaeria kochi (O.P.-Cambridge)
- Walckenaeria cuspidata (Blackwall)
- Walckenaeria vigilax (Blackwall)
- Dicymbium nigrum (Blackwall)
- Dicymbium brevisetosum Locket
- Dicymbium tibiale (Blackwall)
- Entelecara erythropus (Westring)
- Gnathonarium dentatum (Wider)
- Gongylidium rufipes (Sundevall)
- Dismodicus bifrons (Blackwall)
- Hypomma bituberculatum (Wider)
- Hypomma cornutum (Blackwall)
- Metopobactrus prominulus (O.P.-Cambridge)
- Baryphyma trifrons (O.P.-Cambridge)
- Gonatium rubens (Blackwall)
- Gonatium rubellum (Blackwall)
- Maso sundevalli (Westring)
- Peponocranium ludicrum (O.P.-Cambridge)
- Pocadicnemis pumila (Blackwall)
- Pocadicnemis juncea Locket & Millidge
- Oedothorax gibbosus (Blackwall)
- Oedothorax fuscus (Blackwall)
- Oedothorax agrestis (Blackwall)
- Oedothorax retusus (Westring)
- Oedothorax apicatus (Blackwall)
- Trichopterna thorelli (Westring)
- Pelecopsis mengei (Simon)
- Pelecopsis parallela (Wider)
- Silometopus ambiguus (O.P.-Cambridge)
- Silometopus elegans (O.P.-Cambridge)
- Cnephalocotes obscurus (Blackwall)
- Tiso vagans (Blackwall)
- Tapinocyba praecox (O.P.-Cambridge)
- Tapinocyba pallens (O.P.-Cambridge)
- Monocephalus fuscipes (Blackwall)
- Monocephalus castenipes (Simon)
- Lophomma punctatum (Blackwall)
- Gongylidiellum vivum (O.P.-Cambridge)
- Micrargus subaequalis (Westring)
- Micrargus herbigradus (Blackwall)
- Erigonella hiemalis (Blackwall)
- Savignia frontata (Blackwall)
- Diplocephalus cristatus (Blackwall)
- Diplocephalus permixtus (O.P.-Cambridge)
- Diplocephalus latifrons (Blackwall)
- Diplocephalus picinus (Blackwall)
- Araeoncus humilis (Blackwall)
- Araeoncus crassiceps (Westring)
- Erigone dentipalpis (Wider)
- Erigone atra (Blackwall)
- Erigone promiscua (O.P.-Cambridge)
- Erigone arctica (White)
- Erigone longipalpis (Sundevall)
- Drepanotylus uncatus (O.P.-Cambridge)
- Leptothrix hardyi (Blackwall)
- Hilaira excisa (O.P.-Cambridge)
- Halorates reprobus (O.P.-Cambridge)
- Ostearius melanopygius (O.P.-Cambridge)
- Porrhomma pygmaeum (Blackwall)
- Porrhomma convexum (Westring)
- Agyneta subtilis (O.P.-Cambridge)
- Agyneta conigera (O.P.-Cambridge)
- Agyneta decora (O.P.-Cambridge)
- Agyneta cauta (O.P.-Cambridge)
- Agyneta olivacea (Emerton)
- Agyneta ramosa Jackson
- Meioneta rurestris (C.L. Koch)
- Meioneta saxatilis (Blackwall)
- Microneta viaria (Blackwall)
- Centromerus sylvaticus (Blackwall)
- Centromerus prudens (O.P.-Cambridge)
- Tallusia experta (O.P.-Cambridge)
- Centromerita bicolor (Blackwall)
- Centromerita concinna (Thorell)
- Saaristoa abnormis (Blackwall)
- Bathyphantes approximatus (O.P.-Cambridge)
- Bathyphantes gracilis (Blackwall)
- Bathyphantes parvulus (Westring)
- Bathyphantes nigrinus (Westring)
- Kaestneria pullata (O.P.-Cambridge)
- Diplostyla concolor (Wider)
- Poeciloneta variegata (Blackwall)
- Drapetisca socialis (Sundevall)
- Tapinopa longidens (Wider)
- Floronia bucculenta (Clerck)
- Taranucnus setosus (O.P.-Cambridge)
- Labulla thoracica (Wider)
- Stemonyphantes lineatus (Linnaeus)
- Bolyphantes luteolus (Blackwall)
- Lepthyphantes leprosus (Ohlert)
- Lepthyphantes minutus (Blackwall)
- Lepthyphantes alacris (Blackwall)
- Lepthyphantes obscurus (Blackwall)
- Lepthyphantes tenuis (Blackwall)
- Lepthyphantes zimmermanni Bertkau
- Lepthyphantes mengei (Kulczynski)
- Lepthyphantes flavipes (Blackwall)
- Lepthyphantes tenebricola (Wider)
- Lepthyphantes ericaeus (Blackwall)
- Linyphia triangularis (Clerck)
- Neriene montana (Clerck)
- Neriene clathrata (Sundevall)
- Neriene peltata (Wider)
- Microlinyphia pusilla (Sundevall)
- Allomengea scopigera (Grube)

==== Tetragnathidae ====
- Tetragnatha extensa (Linnaeus)
- Tetragnatha montana (Simon)
- Pachygnatha clercki (Sundevall)
- Pachygnatha degeeri (Sundevall)
- Metellina segmentata (Clerck)
- Metellina mengei (Blackwall)
- Metellina merianae (Scopoli)
- European cave spider, Meta menardi (Latreille)

==== Araneidae ====
- European garden spider, Araneus diadematus (Clerck)
- Araneus quadratus (Clerck)
- Larinioides cornutus (Clerck)
- Nuctenea umbratica (Clerck)
- Araniella cucurbitina (Clerck)
- Araniella opisthographa (Kulczynski)
- Zygiella x-notata (Clerck)
- Zygiella atrica (C.L. Koch)

==== Lycosidae ====
- Pardosa monticola (Clerck)
- Pardosa palustris (Linnaeus)
- Pardosa pullata (Clerck)
- Pardosa prativaga (L. Koch)
- Pardosa amentata (Clerck)
- Pardosa nigriceps (Thorell)
- Alopecosa pulverulenta (Clerck)
- Trochosa ruricola (Degeer)
- Trochosa terricola Thorell
- Arctosa perita (Latreille)
- Arctosa leopardus (Sundevall)
- Pirata piraticus (Clerck)
- Pirata latitans (Blackwall)
- Pirata piscatorius (Clerck)

==== Pisauridae ====
- Nursery web spider, Pisaura mirabilis (Clerck)

==== Agelenidae ====
- Agelena labyrinthica (Clerck)
- Textrix denticulata (Olivier)
- Giant house spider, Tegenaria gigantea (Chamberlin & Ivie)
- Tegenaria saeva (Blackwall)
- Domestic house spider, Tegenaria domestica (Clerck) (Mx. Doo-oallee)

==== Cybaeidae ====
- Water spider, Argyroneta aquatica (Clerck)

==== Hahniidae ====
- Antistea elegans (Blackwall)
- Hahnia montana (Blackwall)
- Hahnia nava (Blackwall)

==== Dictynidae ====
- Dictyna arundinacea (Linnaeus)
- Dictyna latens (Fabricius)

==== Amaurobiidae ====
- Amaurobius fenestralis (Stroem)
- Amaurobius similis (Blackwall)
- Amaurobius ferox (Blackwall)
- Coelotes atropos (Walckenaer)

==== Liocranidae ====
- Agroeca proxima (O.P.-Cambridge)
- Scotina gracilipes (Blackwall)
- Phrurolithus festivus (C.L. Koch)

==== Clubionidae ====
- Clubiona reclusa (O.P.-Cambridge)
- Clubiona stagnatilis (Kulczynski)
- Clubiona pallidula (Clerck)
- Clubiona phragmitis (C.L. Koch)
- Clubiona terrestris (Westring)
- Clubiona neglecta (O.P.-Cambridge)
- Clubiona lutescens (Westring)
- Clubiona comta (C.L. Koch)
- Clubiona trivialis (C.L. Koch)
- Clubiona diversa (O.P.-Cambridge)

==== Gnaphosidae ====
- Drassodes lapidosus (Walckenaer)
- Drassodes cupreus (Blackwall)
- Haplodrassus signifer (C.L. Koch)
- Scotophaeus blackwalli (Thorell)
- Zelotes latreillei (Simon)
- Zelotes apricorum (L. Koch)
- Drassyllus lutetianus (L. Koch)
- Drassyllus pusillus (C.L. Koch)
- Micaria pulicaria (Sundevall)

==== Philodromidae ====
- Philodromus aureolus (Clerck)
- Philodromus cespitum (Walckenaer)
- Tibellus maritimus (Menge)

==== Thomisidae ====
- Xysticus cristatus (Clerck)
- Xysticus kochi (Thorell)
- Xysticus erraticus (Blackwall)
- Ozyptila sanctuaria (O.P.-Cambridge)
- Ozyptila trux (Blackwall)
- Ozyptila atomaria (Panzer)

==== Salticidae ====
- Zebra spider, Salticus scenicus (Clerck)
- Heliophanus cupreus (Walckenaer)
- Pseudoeuophrys frontalis (Walckenaer)
- Euophrys lanigera (Simon)
- Sitticus saltator (Simon)

== Pinophyta (conifers) ==
=== Cupressaceae (cypresses) ===
- Common juniper, Juniperus communis

== Magnoliopsida ==
- Agrimony, Agrimonia eupatoria
- Alpine clubmoss, Diphasiastrum alpinum
- Beech fern, Phegopteris connectilis
- Blunt-leaved pondweed, Potamogeton obtusifolius
- Brackish water crowfoot, Ranunculus baudotii
- Burnet saxifrage, Pimpinella saxifraga
- Carline thistle, Carlina vulgaris
- Celery-leaved buttercup, Ranunculus sceleratus
- Common bladderwort, Utricularia vulgaris
- Common cow-wheat, Melampyrum pratense
- Common sea lavender, Limonium vulgare
- Common skullcap, Scutellaria galericulata - rediscovered on 4 July 2022 after an absence of records for 142 years.
- Common wintergreen, Pyrola minor
- Cranberry, Vaccinium oxycoccos
- Dioecious sedge, Carex dioica
- Dodder, Cuscuta epithymum
- Dune fescue, Vulpia fasciculata
- Eelgrass, Zostera marina
- Fennel pondweed, Potamogeton pectinatus
- Few-flowered spike rush, Eleocharis quinqueflora
- Field gentian, Gentianella campestris
- Floating burr-reed, Sparganium natans
- Floating club-rush, Eleogiton fluitans
- Grass-leaved orache, Atriplex littoralis
- Greater broomrape, Orobanche rapum-genistae
- Greater spearwort, Ranunculus lingua
- Hare's-foot clover, Trifolium arvense
- Hay-scented buckler-fern, Dryopteris aemula
- Horned pondweed, Zannichellia palustris
- Iceland cress, Rorippa islandica
- Ivy-leaved bellflower, Wahlenbergia hederacea
- Killarney filmy fern, Trichomanes speciosum
- Least willow, Salix herbacea
- Lesser clubmoss, Selaginella selaginoides
- Lesser tussock-sedge, Carex diandra
- Lesser twayblade, Neottia cordata
- Lesser water-plantain, Baldellia ranunculoides
- Maidenhair fern, Adiantum capillus-veneris
- Marsh hawk's-beard, Crepis paludosa
- Marsh stitchwort, Stellaria palustris
- Mountain pansy, Viola lutea
- Narrow buckler-fern, Dryopteris carthusiana
- Narrow-leaved water-plantain, Alisma lanceolatum
- Nodding bur-marigold, Bidens cernua
- Oyster plant, Mertensia maritima
- Pale butterwort, Pinguicula lusitanica
- Pale sedge, Carex pallescens
- Parsley fern, Cryptogramma crispa
- Parsley water-dropwort, Oenanthe lachenalii
- Pennyroyal, Mentha pulegium
- Pillwort, Pilularia globulifera
- Pink water speedwell, Veronica catenata
- Portland spurge, Euphorbia portlandica
- Rock sea lavender, Limonium binervosum agg.
- Saltmarsh flat-sedge, Blysmus rufus
- Sea purslane, Atriplex portulacoides
- Sea wormwood, Seriphidium maritimum
- Shepherd's cress, Teesdalia nudicaulis
- Slender spike-rush, Eleocharis uniglumis
- Smooth cat's-ear, Hypochaeris glabra
- Spring sandwort, Minuartia verna
- Stagshorn club moss, Lycopodium clavatum
- Strawberry clover, Trifolium fragiferum
- Tubular water-dropwort, Oenanthe fistulosa
- Viper's bugloss, Echium vulgare
- Western clover, Trifolium occidentale
- White sedge, Carex curta
- Wilson's filmy fern, Hymenophyllum wilsonii
- Wood fescue, Festuca altissima
- Wood melick, Melica uniflora
- Wood small-reed, Calamagrostis epigejos
- Wood speedwell, Veronica montana
- Wood vetch, Vicia sylvatica

=== Brassicales ===
- Isle of Man cabbage, Coincya monensis subsp. monensis. In 2019 was recorded in two locations at the Ayres National Nature Reserve.

=== Nymphaeaceae (waterlilies) ===
- Yellow water lily, Nuphar lutea

== Mycetozoa (slime moulds) ==
- Anopodium ampullaceum
- Sporormia fimetaria

== Fungi ==
As of September 2022, 1801 distinct species from the kingdom Fungi have been recorded on NBN Atlas Isle of Man.

- Hymenoscyphus fraxineus ash dieback fungus (previously known as Chalara fraxinea). First identified on Great Britain in 2012 and the Isle of Man in 2017. Since then the fungus has rapidly spread throughout the island.

=== Strophariaceae (dung fungi) ===
Sixty-two species of dung fungi have been recorded in the Isle of Man as of 13 April 2009 by Michael J. Richardson, a British mycologist. The following are from a sample of rabbit (Oryctolagus cuniculus) pellets collected at the Ayres on 6 January 2008.

- Arnium mendax N. Lundq.
- Bombardioidea stercoris (DC.) N. Lundq.
- Coniochaeta hansenii (Oudem.) Cain
- Coniochaeta scatigena (Berk. & Broome) Cain
- Coprinopsis stercorea (Fr.) Redhead, Vilgalys & Moncalvo
- Coprotus sexdecimsporus (P. Crouan & H. Crouan) Kimbr. & Korf
- Delitschia winteri (W. Phillips & Plowr.) Sacc.
- Didymium difforme (Pers.) Gray
- Iodophanus carneus (Pers.) Korf
- Parasola misera (P. Karst.) Redhead, Vilgalys & Hopple
- Pilaira moreaui Y.Ling
- Podospora pleiospora (G. Winter) Niessl
- Schizothecium tetrasporum (G. Winter) N. Lundq.
- Schizothecium vesticola (Berk. & Broome) N. Lundq.
- Sphaeronaemella fimicola Marchal
- Sporormiella australis (Speg.) S.I. Ahmed & Cain
- Sporormiella grandispora S.I. Ahmed & Cain ex J.C. Krug
- Sporormiella intermedia (Auersw.) S.I. Ahmed & Cain
- Thelebolus polysporus (P. Karst.) Y. Otani & Kanzawa
- Trichodelitschia bisporula (P. Crouan & H. Crouan) Munk
- Unguiculella tityri (Velen.) Huhtinen & Spooner ?
