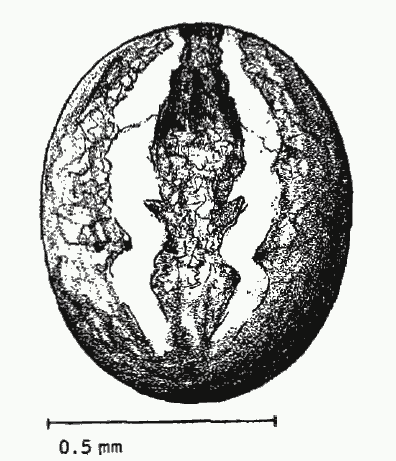
- Dorsal abdomen of female

Scientific classification
- Kingdom: Animalia
- Phylum: Arthropoda
- Subphylum: Chelicerata
- Class: Arachnida
- Order: Araneae
- Infraorder: Araneomorphae
- Family: Theridiidae
- Genus: Theridion
- Species: T. attritum

Binomial name
- Theridion attritum (Simon, 1908)

Synonyms
- Billima attrita

= Theridion attritum =

Species of spider

Theridion attritum is a spider from Western Australia. While it was formerly placed in the families Araneidae and Theridiosomatidae' in 1967 it was found to belong to the family Theridiidae, and indeed to the genus Theridion. While all members of the first two families have a large colulus, while T. attritum lacks one altogether. It is not to be confused with Anelosimus attritus, which was for a time known as Theridion attritum.

== Description ==
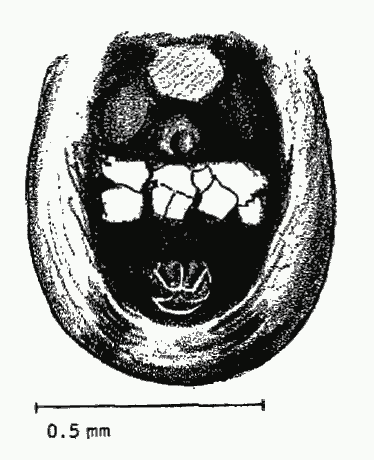
ventral abdomen of female

Theridion attritum is 2.2mm long. It has a yellowish carapace with a black line all around. The sternum is yellow-orange with gray pigment, the legs are yellow with darker marks. The top of the abdomen is whitish with a median darker longitudinal band, irregular in outline and bordered on each side by a white band. The venter is black with a white transverse pigment band. The species is surprisingly similar to Theridion melanurum and Theridion varians, but much smaller.
