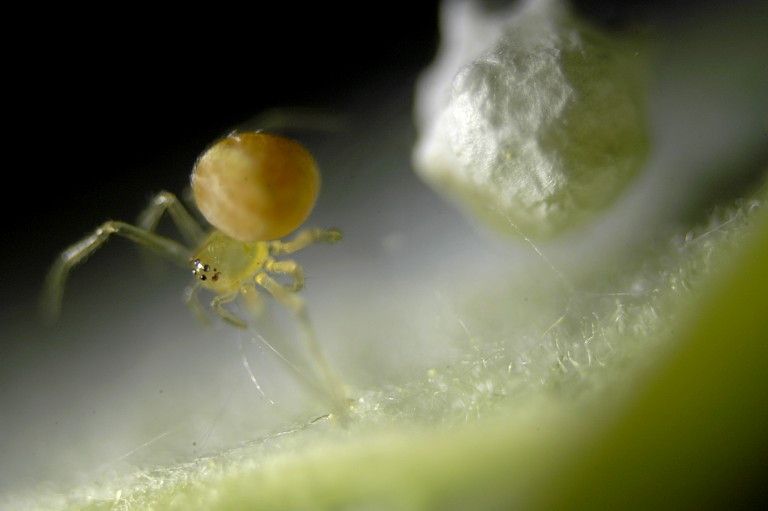
- Paidiscura pallens

Scientific classification
- Kingdom: Animalia
- Phylum: Arthropoda
- Subphylum: Chelicerata
- Class: Arachnida
- Order: Araneae
- Infraorder: Araneomorphae
- Family: Theridiidae
- Genus: Paidiscura; Archer, 1950

Type species
- P. pallens (Blackwall, 1834)

Species
- 4, see text

= Paidiscura =

Genus of spiders

Paidiscura is a genus of comb-footed spiders that was first described by Allan Frost Archer in 1950.

== Species ==
As of May 2020 it contains four species, found in Asia, Africa, and Europe:

- Paidiscura dromedaria (Simon, 1880) – Cape Verde Is., Spain, France, Italy, Greece, North Africa to Middle East
- Paidiscura orotavensis (Schmidt, 1968) – Canary Is., Madeira
- Paidiscura pallens (Blackwall, 1834) (type) – Europe, Algeria, Turkey, Georgia, Russia (Europe to South Siberia)
- Paidiscura subpallens (Bösenberg & Strand, 1906) – China, Korea, Japan

Formerly included:

- P. genistae (Simon, 1873) (Transferred to Theridion)
- P. genistae (Charitonov, 1946) (Transferred to Theridion)
- P. musiva (Simon, 1873) (Transferred to Ruborridion)
- P. pinicola (Simon, 1873) (Transferred to Theridion)

In synonymy:

- P. bigibba (O. Pickard-Cambridge, 1912) = Paidiscura dromedaria (Simon, 1880)
- P. caboverdensis (Schmidt & Piepho, 1994) = Paidiscura dromedaria (Simon, 1880)
- P. caninotata (Bösenberg & Strand, 1906) = Paidiscura subpallens (Bösenberg & Strand, 1906)
- P. mirabilis (Zhu, Zhang & Xu, 1991) = Paidiscura subpallens (Bösenberg & Strand, 1906)
- P. palustre ) = Paidiscura dromedaria (Simon, 1880)
