= Silometopus elegans =

Scientific classification
- Kingdom: Animalia
- Phylum: Arthropoda
- Subphylum: Chelicerata
- Class: Arachnida
- Order: Araneae
- Infraorder: Araneomorphae
- Family: Linyphiidae
- Genus: Silometopus
- Species: S. elegans

Binomial name
- Silometopus elegans (O. Pickard-Cambridge, 1873)

Synonyms
- Erigone elegans O. Pickard-Cambridge, 1873; Cnephalocotes elegans (O. Pickard-Cambridge, 1873)

Species of spider

Silometopus elegans is a species of spiders in the family Linyphiidae found in Europe. It was first described by Octavius Pickard-Cambridge in 1873, as Erigone elegans. It was transferred to the genus Silometopus by Eugène Simon in 1884.

== See also ==
- Biota of the Isle of Man
- List of arachnids of Ireland
