= Paidiscura orotavensis =

Scientific classification
- Domain: Eukaryota
- Kingdom: Animalia
- Phylum: Arthropoda
- Subphylum: Chelicerata
- Class: Arachnida
- Order: Araneae
- Infraorder: Araneomorphae
- Family: Theridiidae
- Genus: Paidiscura
- Species: P. orotavensis

Binomial name
- Paidiscura orotavensis (Schmidt, 1968)

Species of spider

Paidiscura orotavensis is a species of comb-footed spider in the family Theridiidae. It is found in the Canary Islands and Madeira.
