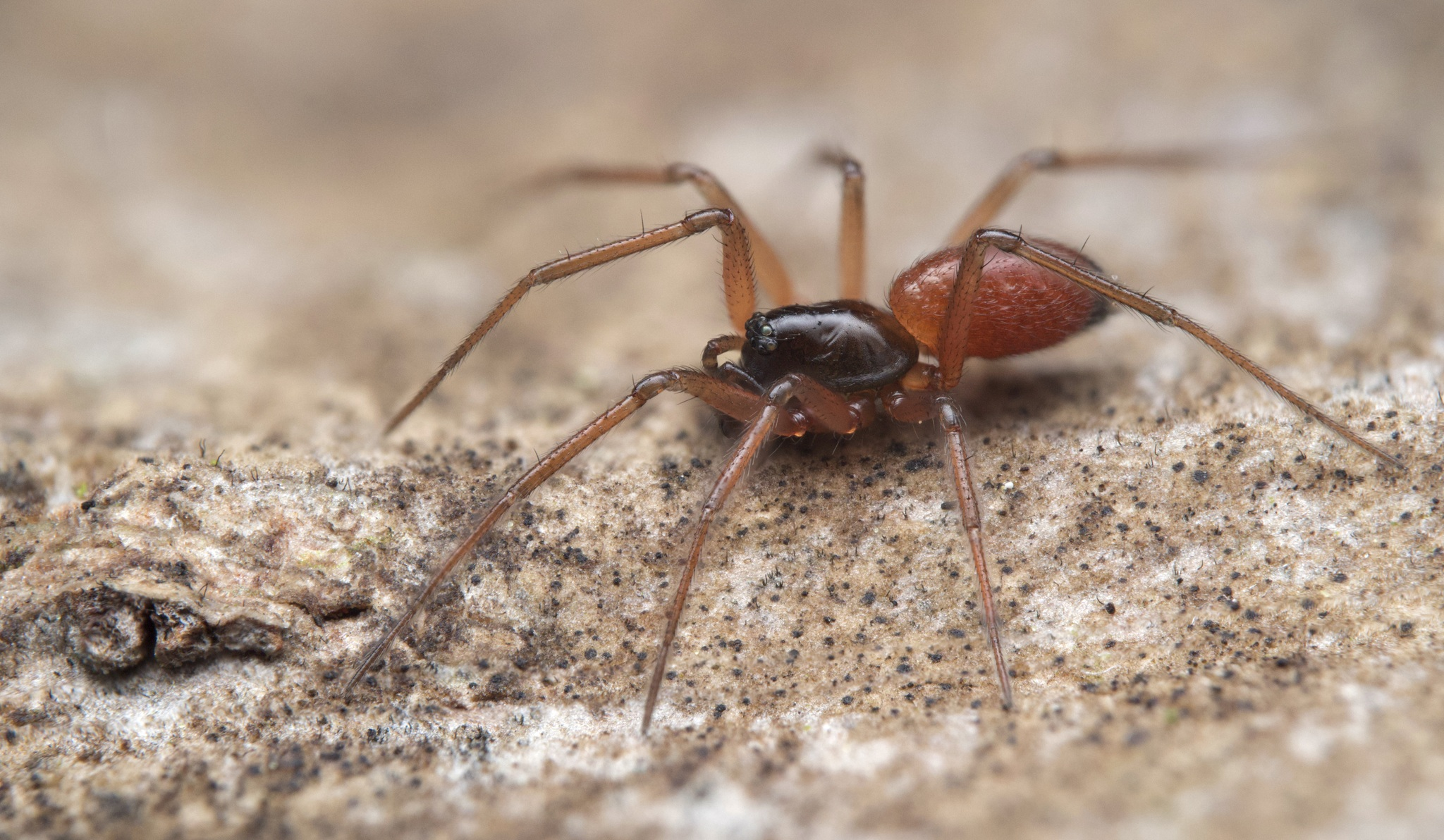
- O. melanopygius
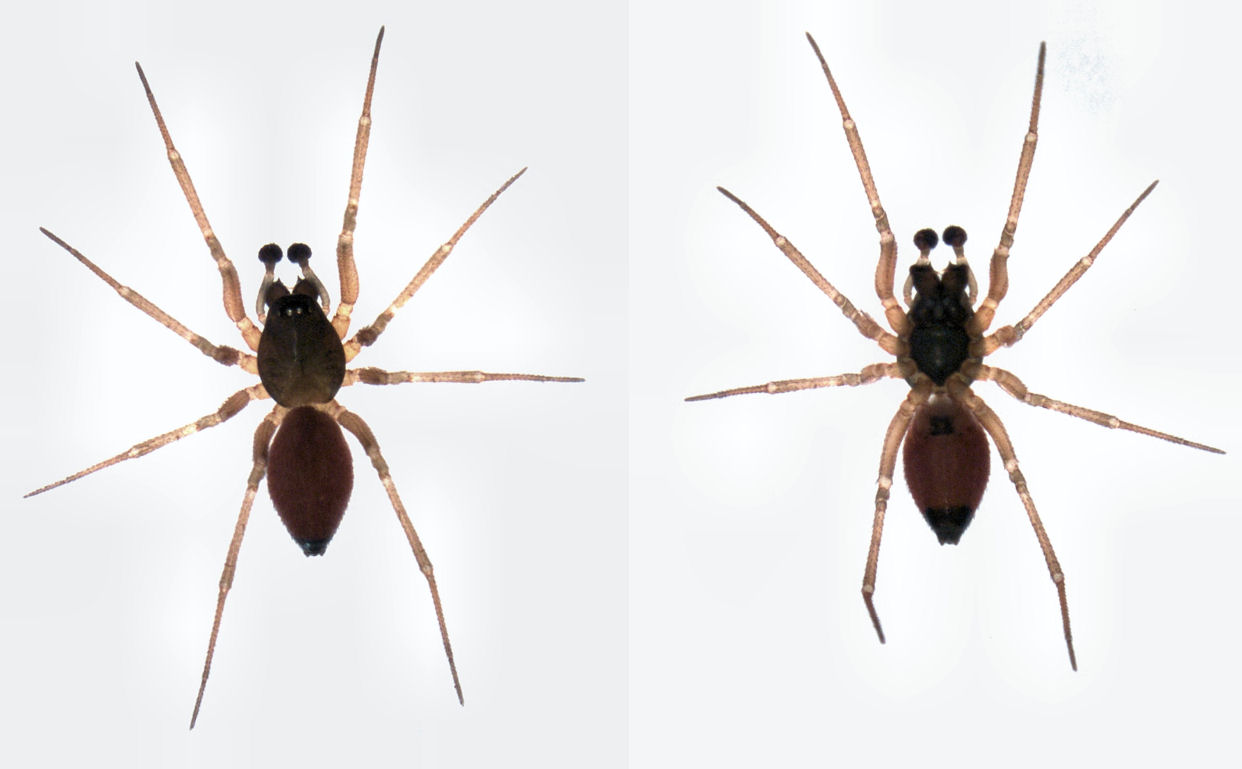
- male O. melanopygius

Scientific classification
- Kingdom: Animalia
- Phylum: Arthropoda
- Subphylum: Chelicerata
- Class: Arachnida
- Order: Araneae
- Infraorder: Araneomorphae
- Family: Linyphiidae
- Genus: Ostearius; Hull, 1911

Type species
- O. melanopygius (O. Pickard-Cambridge, 1880)

Species
- 2, see text

Synonyms
- Haemathyphantes Caporiacco, 1949

= Ostearius =

Genus of spiders

Ostearius is a genus of dwarf spiders that was first described by J. E. Hull in 1911.

== Species ==
As of October 2025, this genus includes two species:

- Ostearius melanopygius (O. Pickard-Cambridge, 1880) – South America. Introduced to Canada, St. Helena, Europe, Canary Is. to Turkey and Egypt, Ethiopia, Kenya, Tanzania, Namibia, South Africa, China, Malaysia, Indonesia, New Zealand (type species)
- Ostearius muticus J. C. Gao, Y. Q. Gao & Zhu, 1994 – China
