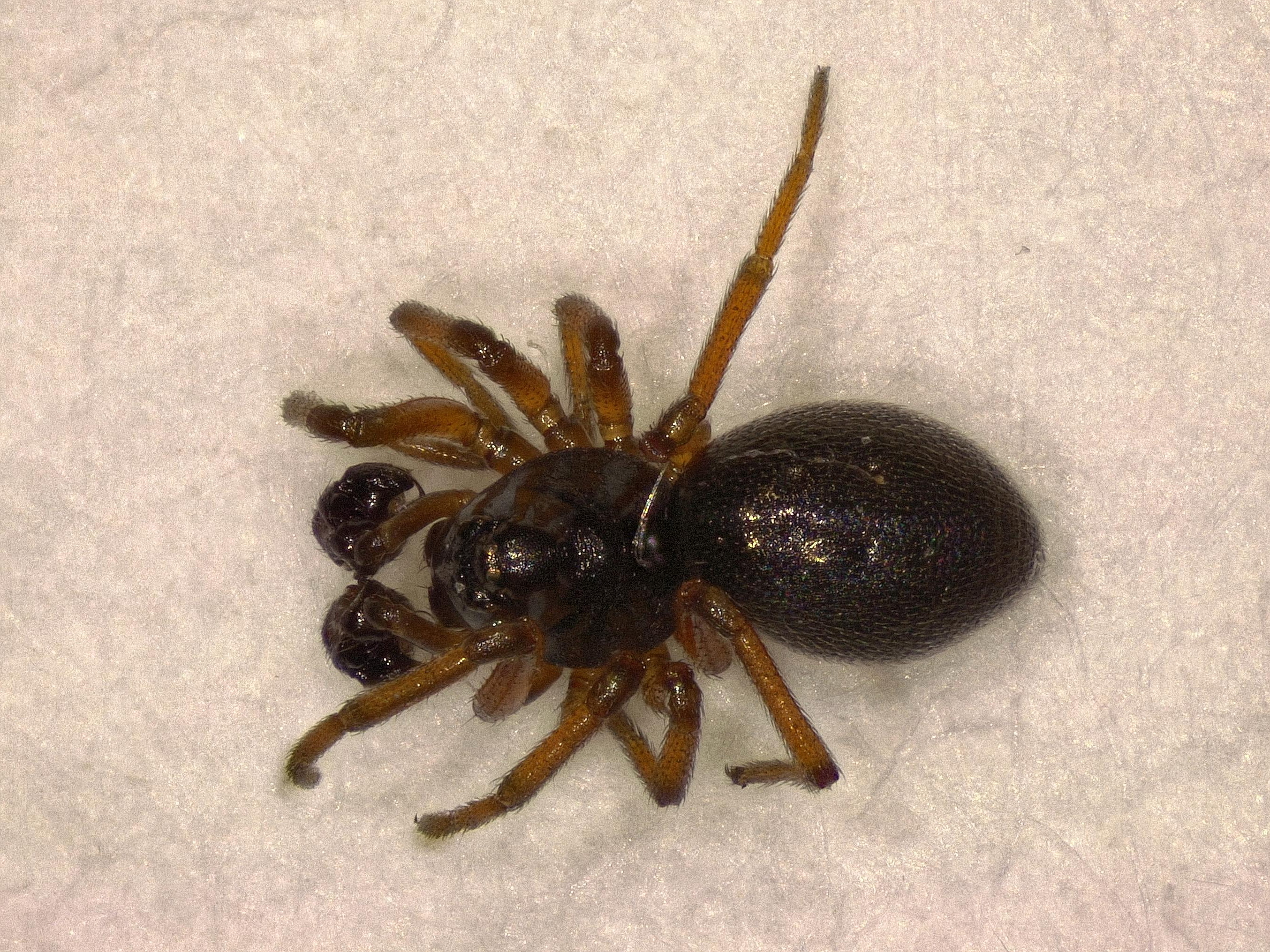
- S. reussi, male

Scientific classification
- Kingdom: Animalia
- Phylum: Arthropoda
- Subphylum: Chelicerata
- Class: Arachnida
- Order: Araneae
- Infraorder: Araneomorphae
- Family: Linyphiidae
- Genus: Silometopus; Simon, 1926

Type species
- S. curtus (Simon, 1881)

Species
- 18, see text

Synonyms
- Scleroschaema Hull, 1911

= Silometopus =

Genus of spiders

Silometopus is a genus of sheet weavers that was first described by Eugène Louis Simon in 1926.

== Species ==
As of August 2021 it contains eighteen species, found in Asia and Europe:

- Silometopus acutus Holm, 1977 – Sweden, Poland, Russia (Europe)
- Silometopus ambiguus (O. Pickard-Cambridge, 1906) – Western and northern Europe
- Silometopus bonessi Casemir, 1970 – Belgium, Switzerland, Austria, Germany, Slovakia
- Silometopus braunianus Thaler, 1978 – Alps (Switzerland, Italy, Austria)
- Silometopus crassipedis Tanasevitch & Piterkina, 2007 – Russia (Europe), Kazakhstan
- Silometopus curtus (Simon, 1881) (type) – Spain, France, ?Hungary, ?Malta, ?Egypt
- Silometopus elegans (O. Pickard-Cambridge, 1873) – Europe, Russia (Europe to Central Asia/Siberia)
- Silometopus elton Tanasevitch & Grushko, 2020 – Russia (Europe)
- Silometopus graecus Bosmans, 2020 – Greece
- Silometopus incurvatus (O. Pickard-Cambridge, 1873) – Europe, Russia (Europe to West Siberia), Central Asia
- Silometopus minutus Tanasevitch, 2016 – Israel
- Silometopus nitidithorax (Simon, 1915) – France, Greece
- Silometopus pectinatus Tanasevitch, 2016 – Israel
- Silometopus reussi (Thorell, 1871) – Europe, Russia (Europe to Far East), China
- Silometopus rosemariae Wunderlich, 1969 – Spain, France, Germany, Switzerland, Austria, Italy
- Silometopus sachalinensis (Eskov & Marusik, 1994) – Russia (Sakhalin), Japan
- Silometopus tenuispinus Denis, 1950 – France, Andorra
- Silometopus uralensis Tanasevitch, 1985 – Russia (Urals to Central Asia/Siberia)
