= Schizothecium miniglutinans =

Scientific classification
- Domain: Eukaryota
- Kingdom: Fungi
- Division: Ascomycota
- Class: Sordariomycetes
- Order: Sordariales
- Family: Lasiosphaeriaceae
- Genus: Schizothecium
- Species: S. miniglutinans

Binomial name
- Schizothecium miniglutinans (J.H.Mirza & Cain) N.Lundq.

Species of fungi

Schizothecium miniglutinans is a species of coprophilous fungus in the family Lasiosphaeriaceae. It is known to grow in the dung of goats and possibly on that of sheep.
