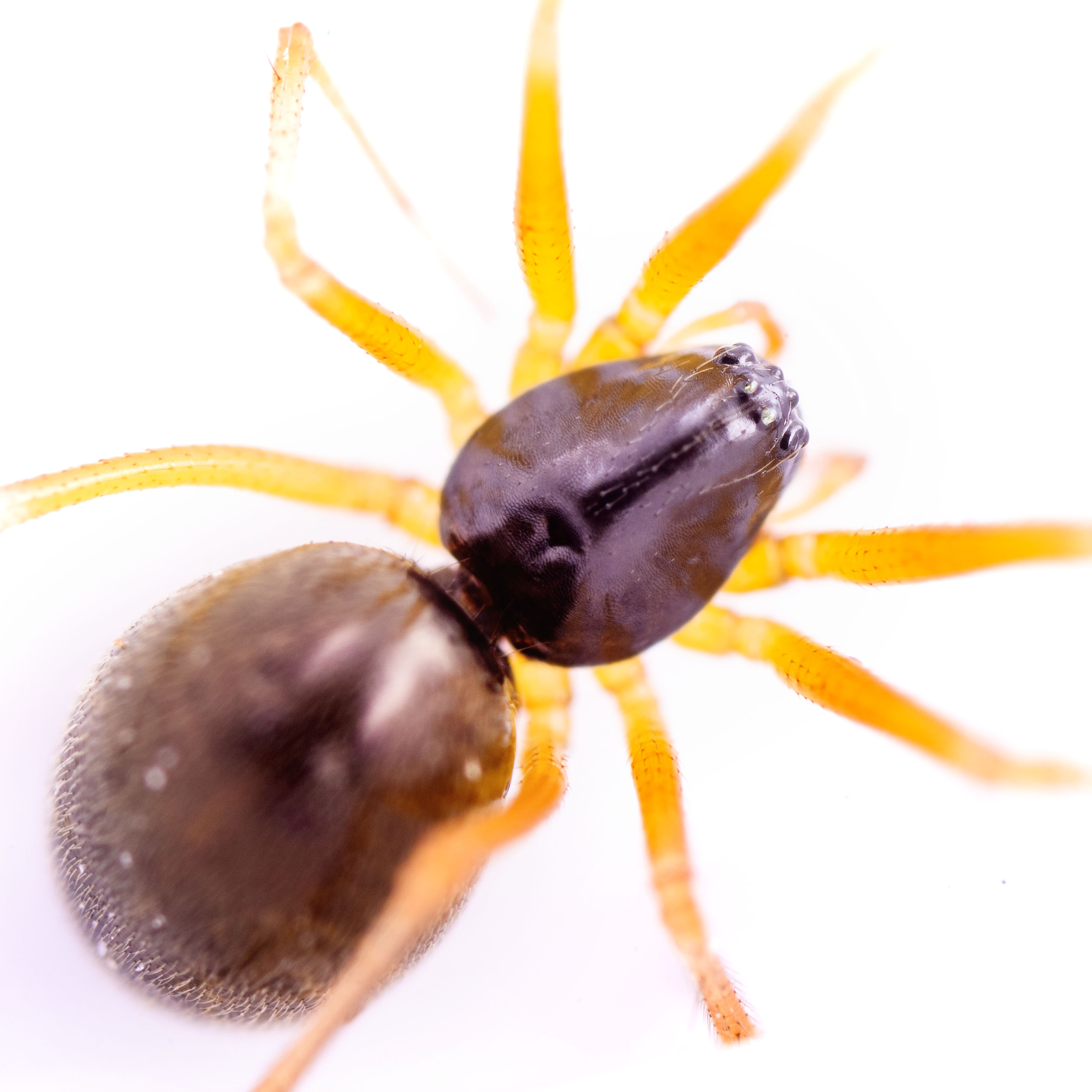

Scientific classification
- Domain: Eukaryota
- Kingdom: Animalia
- Phylum: Arthropoda
- Subphylum: Chelicerata
- Class: Arachnida
- Order: Araneae
- Infraorder: Araneomorphae
- Family: Linyphiidae
- Genus: Kaestneria
- Species: K. dorsalis

Binomial name
- Kaestneria dorsalis (Wider, 1834)

= Kaestneria dorsalis =

Species of spider

Kaestneria dorsalis is a species of spider belonging to the family Linyphiidae.

It is native to Europe.
