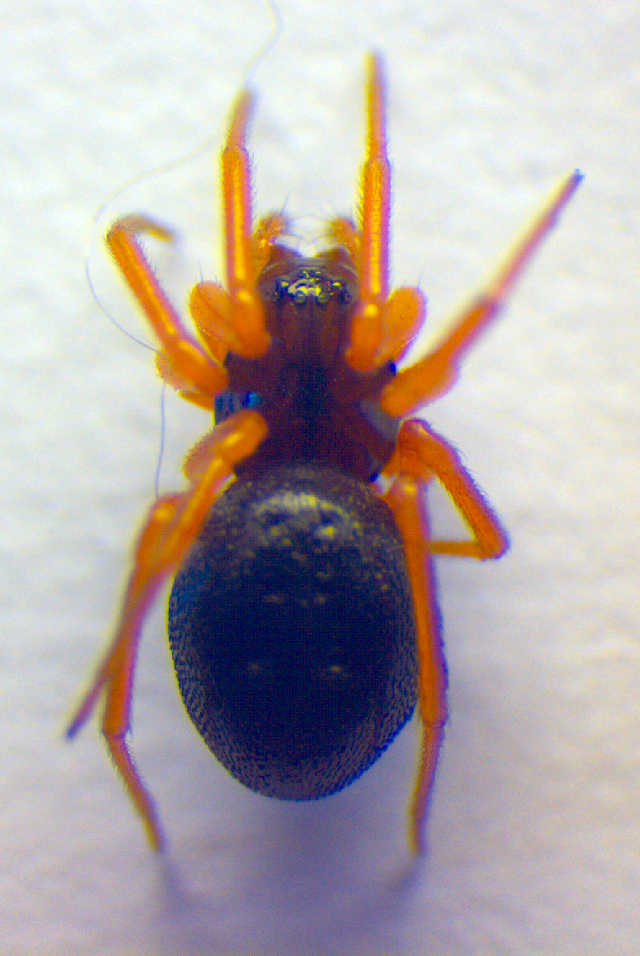
- B. pratense

Scientific classification
- Kingdom: Animalia
- Phylum: Arthropoda
- Subphylum: Chelicerata
- Class: Arachnida
- Order: Araneae
- Infraorder: Araneomorphae
- Family: Linyphiidae
- Genus: Baryphyma; Simon, 1884

Type species
- B. pratense (Blackwall, 1861)

Species
- 6, see text

Synonyms
- Acanthophyma Locket, Millidge & Merrett, 1974; Minyrioloides Schenkel, 1930; Porrhothrix Denis, 1945

= Baryphyma =

Genus of spiders

Baryphyma is a genus of dwarf spiders that was first described by Eugène Louis Simon in 1884.

== Species ==
As of May 2019 it contains six species:

- Baryphyma gowerense (Locket, 1965) – North America, Ireland, Britain, Scandinavia, Estonia, Poland, Russia (Europe to Middle Siberia)
- Baryphyma insigne (Palmgren, 1976) – Finland, Russia (Europe)
- Baryphyma maritimum (Crocker & Parker, 1970) – Western and Central Europe, Kyrgyzstan
- Baryphyma pratense (Blackwall, 1861) (type) – Europe
- Baryphyma proclive (Simon, 1884) – Italy
- Baryphyma trifrons (O. Pickard-Cambridge, 1863) – North America, Europe, Caucasus, Russia (Europe to Far East), Kazakhstan
