= Paidiscura subpallens =

Scientific classification
- Kingdom: Animalia
- Phylum: Arthropoda
- Subphylum: Chelicerata
- Class: Arachnida
- Order: Araneae
- Infraorder: Araneomorphae
- Family: Theridiidae
- Genus: Paidiscura
- Species: P. subpallens

Binomial name
- Paidiscura subpallens (Bösenberg & Strand, 1906)

Species of spider

Paidiscura subpallens is a species of comb-footed spider in the family Theridiidae. It is found in China, Korea, and Japan.
