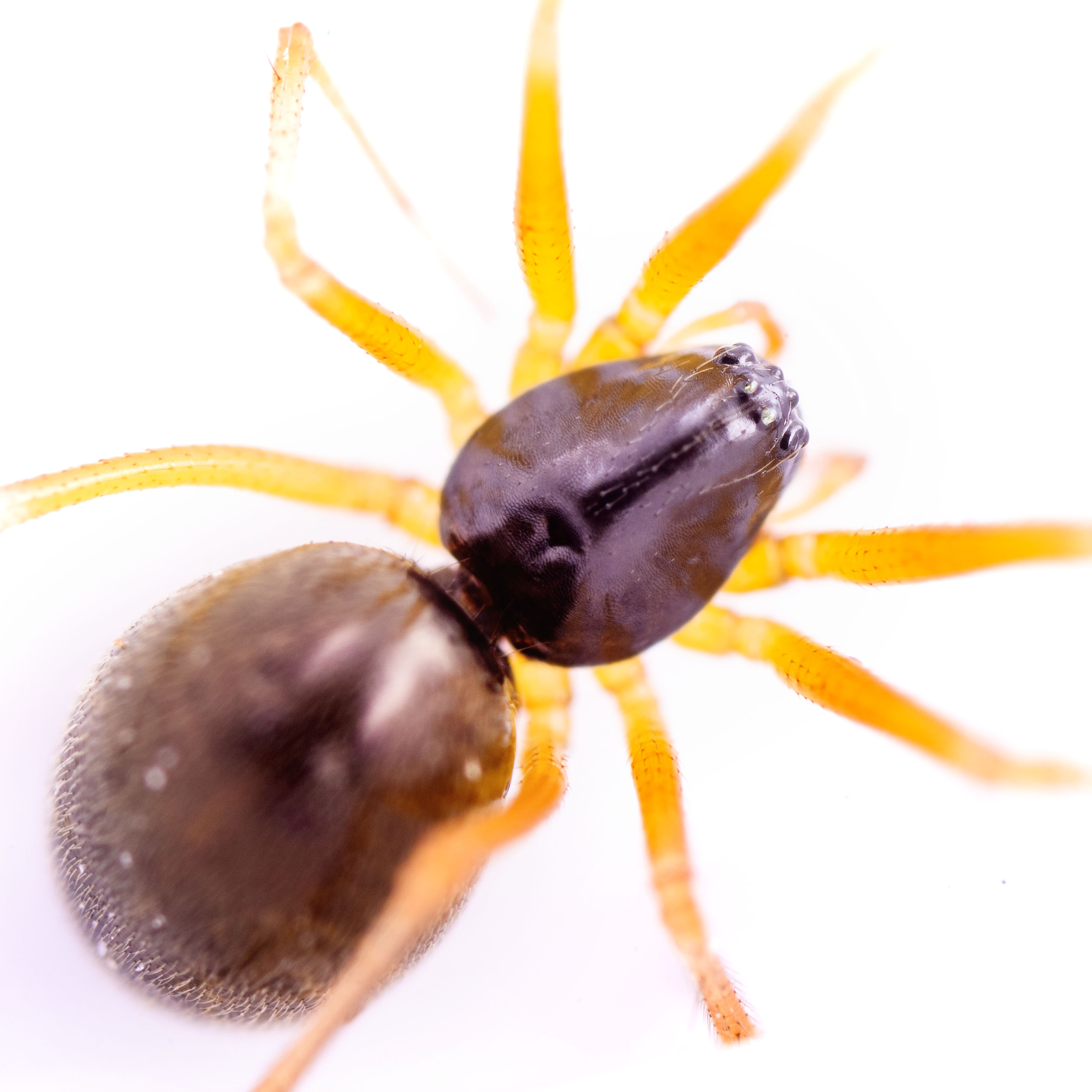
- Female Kaestneria dorsalis in Finland
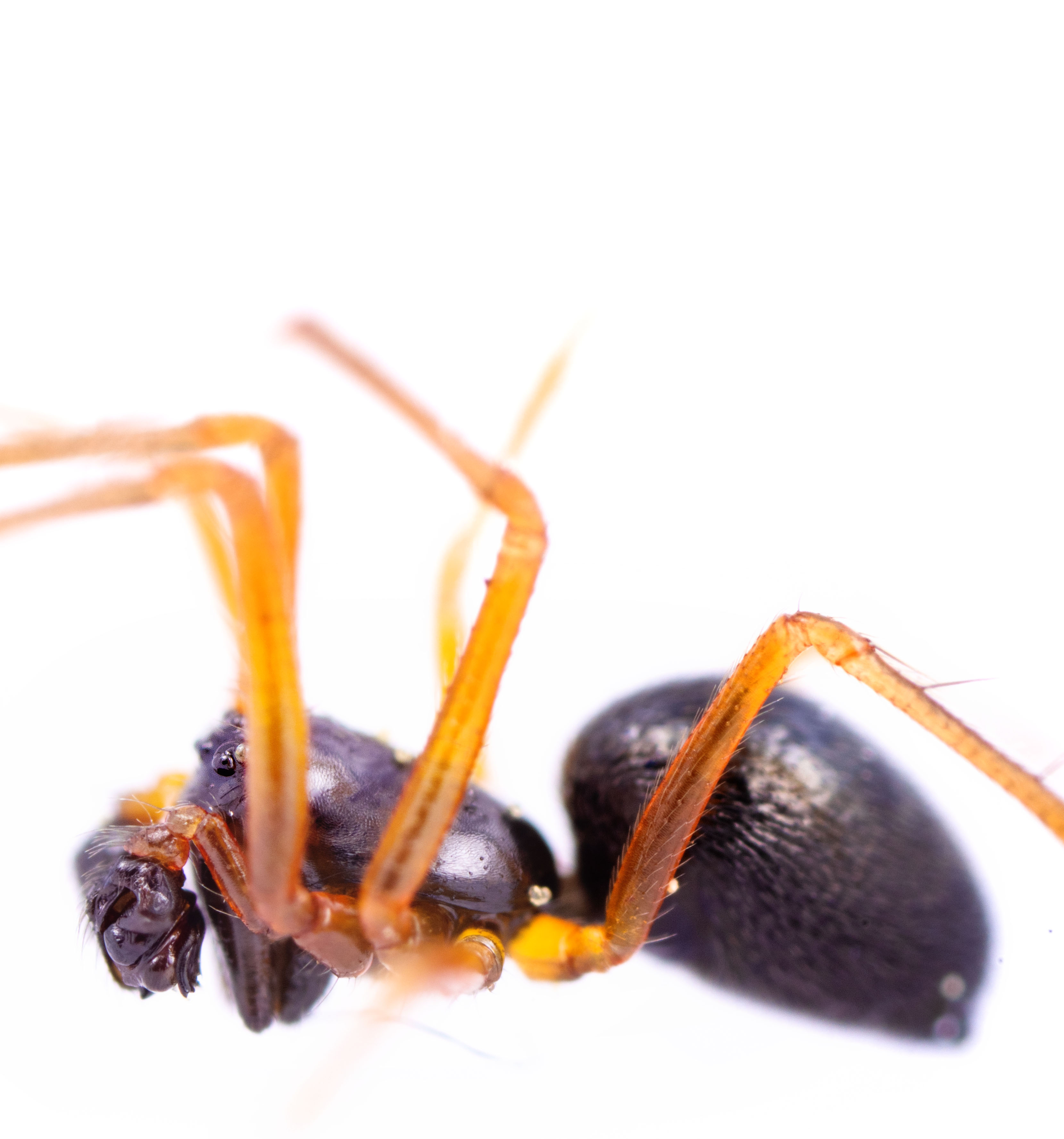
- Male Kaestneria dorsalis in Finland

Scientific classification
- Kingdom: Animalia
- Phylum: Arthropoda
- Subphylum: Chelicerata
- Class: Arachnida
- Order: Araneae
- Infraorder: Araneomorphae
- Family: Linyphiidae
- Genus: Kaestneria; Wiehle, 1956

Type species
- K. dorsalis (Wider, 1834)

Species
- 8, see text

= Kaestneria =

Genus of spiders

Kaestneria is a genus of dwarf spiders that was first described by H. Wiehle in 1956.

== Species ==
As of May 2019 it contains eight species, found in Canada, China, Czech Republic, Hungary, Indonesia, Japan, Malaysia, Mongolia, Poland, Romania, Russia, Slovakia, Ukraine, and the United States:

- Kaestneria bicultrata Chen & Yin, 2000 – China, Indonesia (Sumatra, Belitung Is.)
- Kaestneria dorsalis (Wider, 1834) (type) – Europe, Russia (Europe to South Siberia)
- Kaestneria longissima (Zhu & Wen, 1983) – Russia (Far East), China
- Kaestneria minima Locket, 1982 – Malaysia
- Kaestneria pullata (O. Pickard-Cambridge, 1863) – North America, Europe, Russia (Europe to Far East), China, Mongolia, Japan
- Kaestneria rufula (Hackman, 1954) – USA, Canada
- Kaestneria torrentum (Kulczyński, 1882) – Poland, Czechia, Slovakia, Hungary, Romania, Ukraine
- Kaestneria valentissima Irfan & Peng, 2018 – China

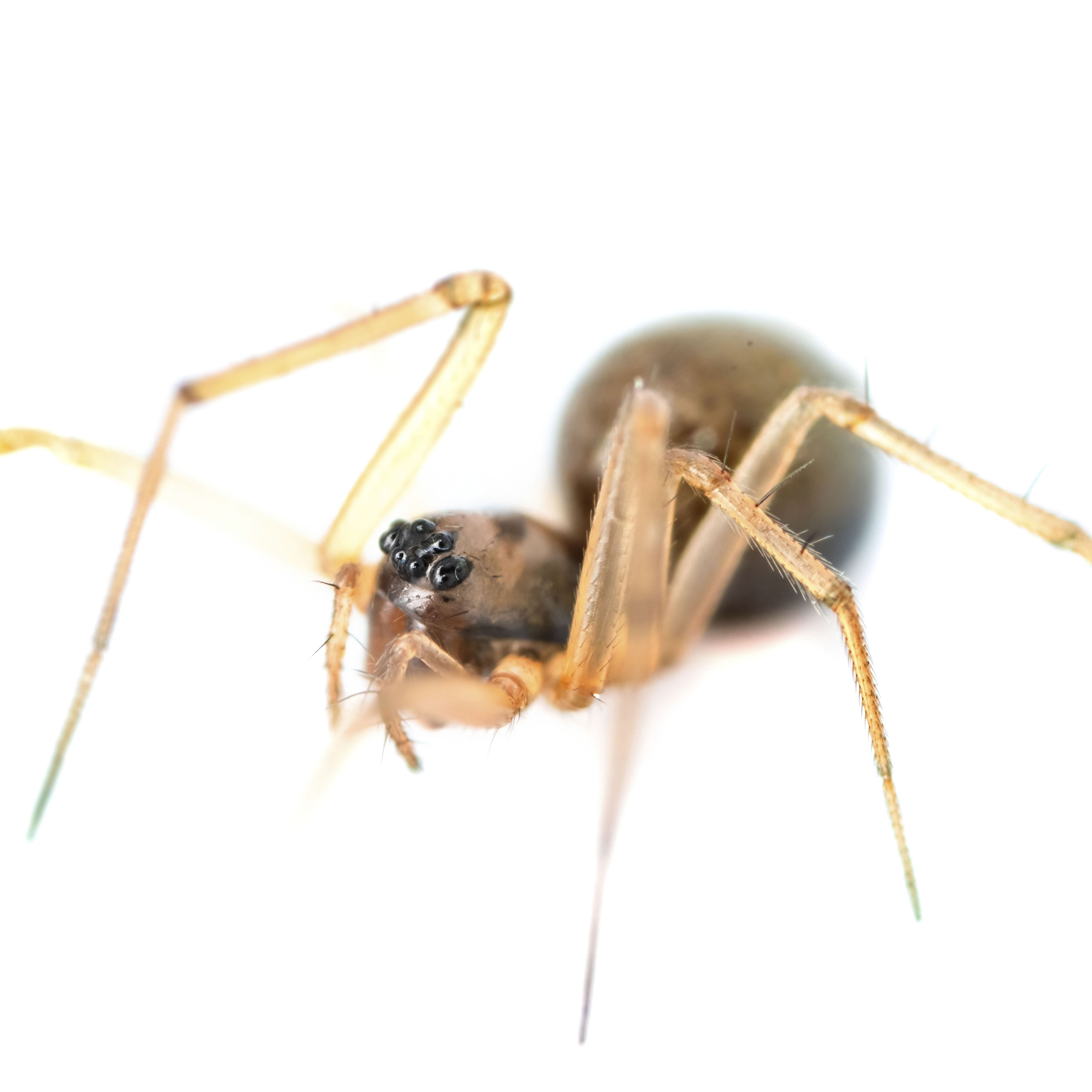
Female Kaestneria pullata
