= Schizothecium =

Scientific classification
- Kingdom: Fungi
- Division: Ascomycota
- Class: Sordariomycetes
- Order: Sordariales
- Family: Lasiosphaeriaceae
- Genus: Schizothecium; Corda (1838)

Type species
- Schizothecium fimicola Corda (1838)

Genus of fungi

Schizothecium is a genus of fungi in the family Lasiosphaeriaceae.

== Species ==
- Schizothecium alloeochaetum
- Schizothecium aloides
- Schizothecium carpinicola
- Schizothecium cervinum
- Schizothecium conicum
- Schizothecium curvisporum
- Schizothecium curvuloides
- Schizothecium dakotense
- Schizothecium dubium
- Schizothecium fimbriatum
- Schizothecium fimicola
- Schizothecium formosanum
- Schizothecium glutinans
- Schizothecium hispidulum
- Schizothecium inaequale
- Schizothecium linguiforme
- Schizothecium longicolle
- Schizothecium miniglutinans
- Schizothecium multipilosum
- Schizothecium nannopodale
- Schizothecium nanum
- Schizothecium oedotrichum
- Schizothecium papillisporum
- Schizothecium pilosum
- Schizothecium simile
- Schizothecium squamulosum
- Schizothecium tetrasporum
- Schizothecium vesticola
- Schizothecium vratislaviensis
