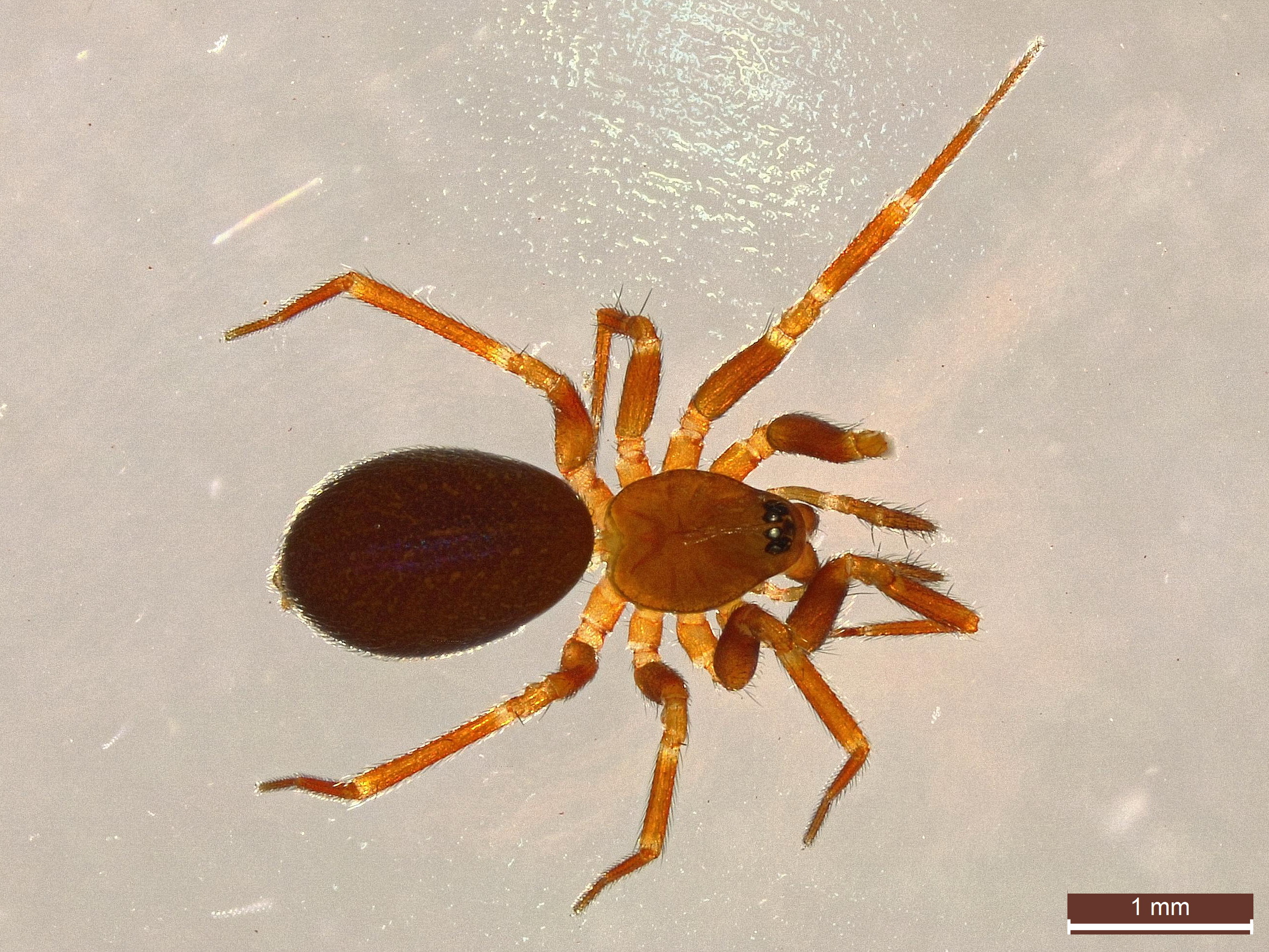
- M. viaria, female

Scientific classification
- Kingdom: Animalia
- Phylum: Arthropoda
- Subphylum: Chelicerata
- Class: Arachnida
- Order: Araneae
- Infraorder: Araneomorphae
- Family: Linyphiidae
- Genus: Microneta; Menge, 1869

Type species
- M. viaria (Blackwall, 1841)

Species
- 11, see text

= Microneta =

Genus of spiders

Microneta is a genus of dwarf spiders that was first described by Anton Menge in 1869.

== Species ==
As of May 2019 it contains eleven species:

- Microneta caestata (Thorell, 1875) – Sweden
- Microneta disceptra Crosby & Bishop, 1929 – Peru
- Microneta flaveola Banks, 1892 – USA
- Microneta formicaria Balogh, 1938 – New Guinea
- Microneta inops (Thorell, 1875) – Sweden
- Microneta orines Chamberlin & Ivie, 1933 – USA
- Microneta semiatra (Keyserling, 1886) – Brazil
- Microneta sima Chamberlin & Ivie, 1936 – Mexico
- Microneta varia Simon, 1898 – St. Vincent
- Microneta viaria (Blackwall, 1841) (type) – North America, Europe, Turkey, North Africa, Caucasus, Russia (European to Far East), China, Mongolia, Korea, Japan
- Microneta watona Chamberlin & Ivie, 1936 – Mexico
