= Centromerita =

Scientific classification
- Kingdom: Animalia
- Phylum: Arthropoda
- Subphylum: Chelicerata
- Class: Arachnida
- Order: Araneae
- Infraorder: Araneomorphae
- Family: Linyphiidae
- Genus: Centromerita; Dahl, 1912

Type species
- C. bicolor (Blackwall, 1833)

Species
- C. bicolor (Blackwall, 1833) – USA, Canada, Europe; C. concinna (Thorell, 1875) – Europe, Caucasus (Russia, Georgia)

Genus of spiders

Centromerita is a genus of dwarf spiders that was first described by David B. Hirst in 1912. As of May 2019 it contains only two species: C. bicolor and C. concinna.
