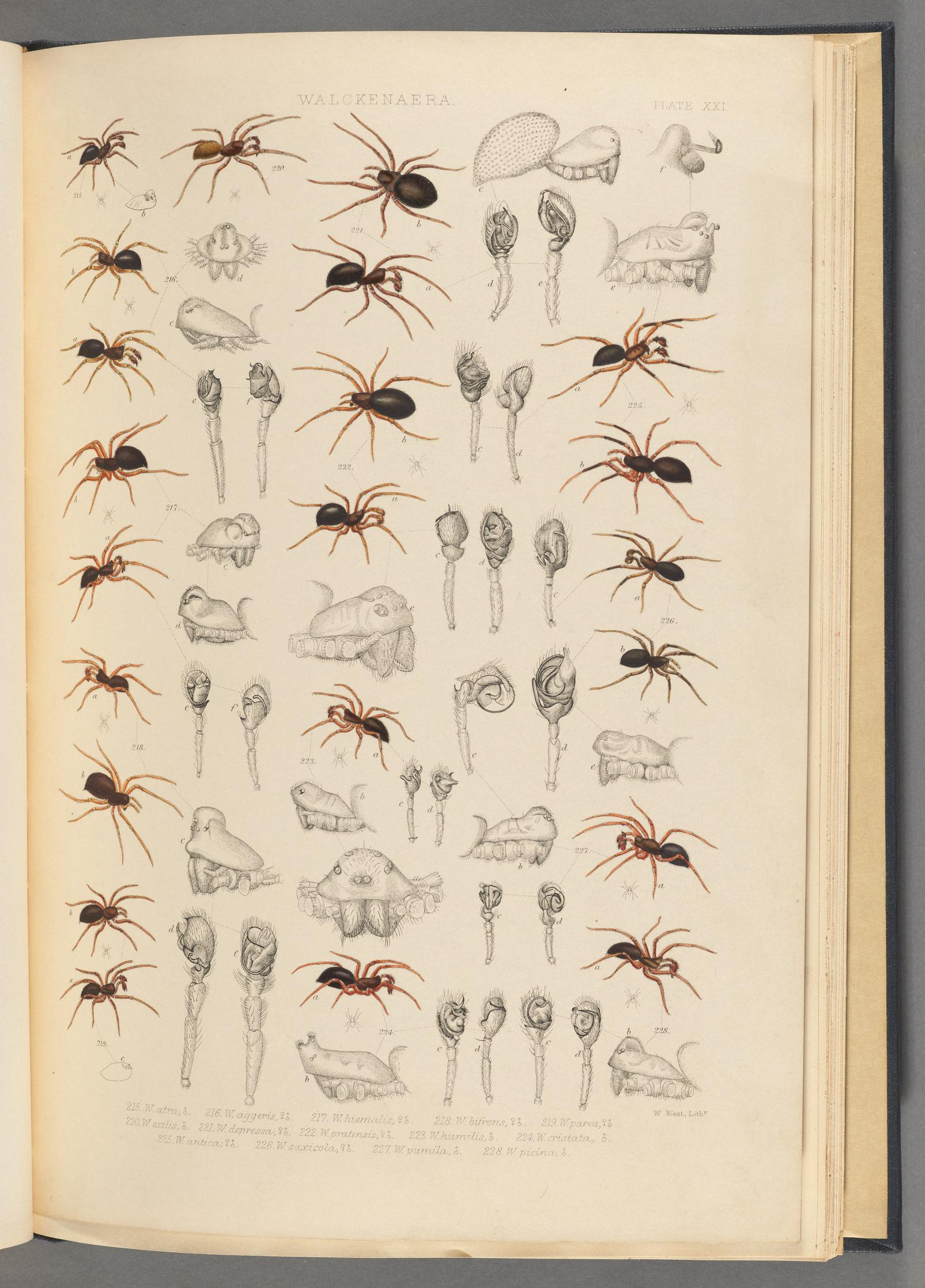
- Pocadicnemis pumila (figure 227)

Scientific classification
- Kingdom: Animalia
- Phylum: Arthropoda
- Subphylum: Chelicerata
- Class: Arachnida
- Order: Araneae
- Infraorder: Araneomorphae
- Family: Linyphiidae
- Genus: Pocadicnemis; Simon, 1884

Type species
- P. pumila (Blackwall, 1841)

Species
- 7, see text

= Pocadicnemis =

Genus of spiders

Pocadicnemis is a genus of sheet weavers that was first described by Eugène Louis Simon in 1884.

== Species ==
As of May 2019 it contains seven species, found in Asia and Europe:

- Pocadicnemis americana Millidge, 1976 – USA, Canada, Greenland
- Pocadicnemis carpatica (Chyzer, 1894) – Central, Eastern Europe
- Pocadicnemis desioi Caporiacco, 1935 – Karakorum
- Pocadicnemis jacksoni Millidge, 1976 – Portugal, Spain, France, China
- Pocadicnemis juncea Locket & Millidge, 1953 – Europe, Georgia
- Pocadicnemis occidentalis Millidge, 1976 – USA
- Pocadicnemis pumila (Blackwall, 1841) (type) – North America, Europe, Turkey, Caucasus, Russia (European to Far East), Japan
