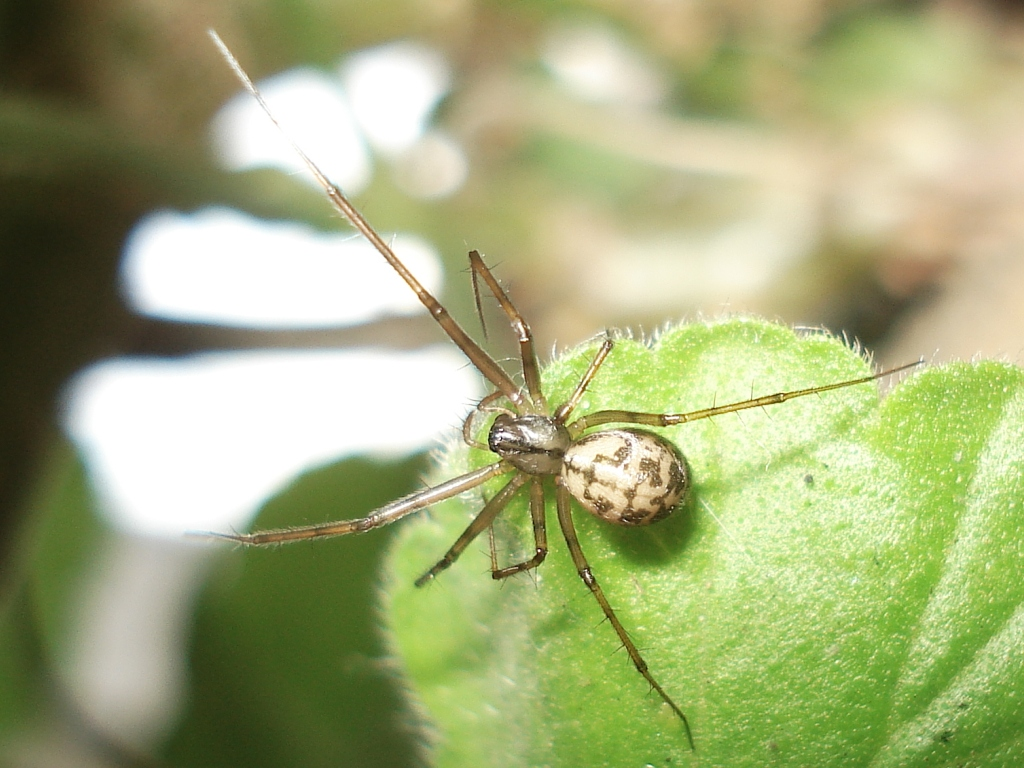
- Labulla thoracica

Scientific classification
- Kingdom: Animalia
- Phylum: Arthropoda
- Subphylum: Chelicerata
- Class: Arachnida
- Order: Araneae
- Infraorder: Araneomorphae
- Family: Linyphiidae
- Genus: Labulla; Simon, 1884

Type species
- L. thoracica (Wider, 1834)

Species
- L. flahaulti Simon, 1915 – France, Spain; L. machadoi Hormiga & Scharff, 2005 – Portugal; L. thoracica (Wider, 1834) – Europe

= Labulla =

Genus of spiders

Labulla is a genus of dwarf spiders that was first described by Eugène Louis Simon in 1884. As of May 2019 it contains only three species, found in France, Portugal, and Spain: L. flahaulti, L. machadoi, and L. thoracica.
