= Paidiscura dromedaria =

Scientific classification
- Kingdom: Animalia
- Phylum: Arthropoda
- Subphylum: Chelicerata
- Class: Arachnida
- Order: Araneae
- Infraorder: Araneomorphae
- Family: Theridiidae
- Genus: Paidiscura
- Species: P. dromedaria

Binomial name
- Paidiscura dromedaria (Simon, 1880)

Species of spider

Paidiscura dromedaria is a species of comb-footed spider in the family Theridiidae. It is found in the Mediterranean and Middle East.
