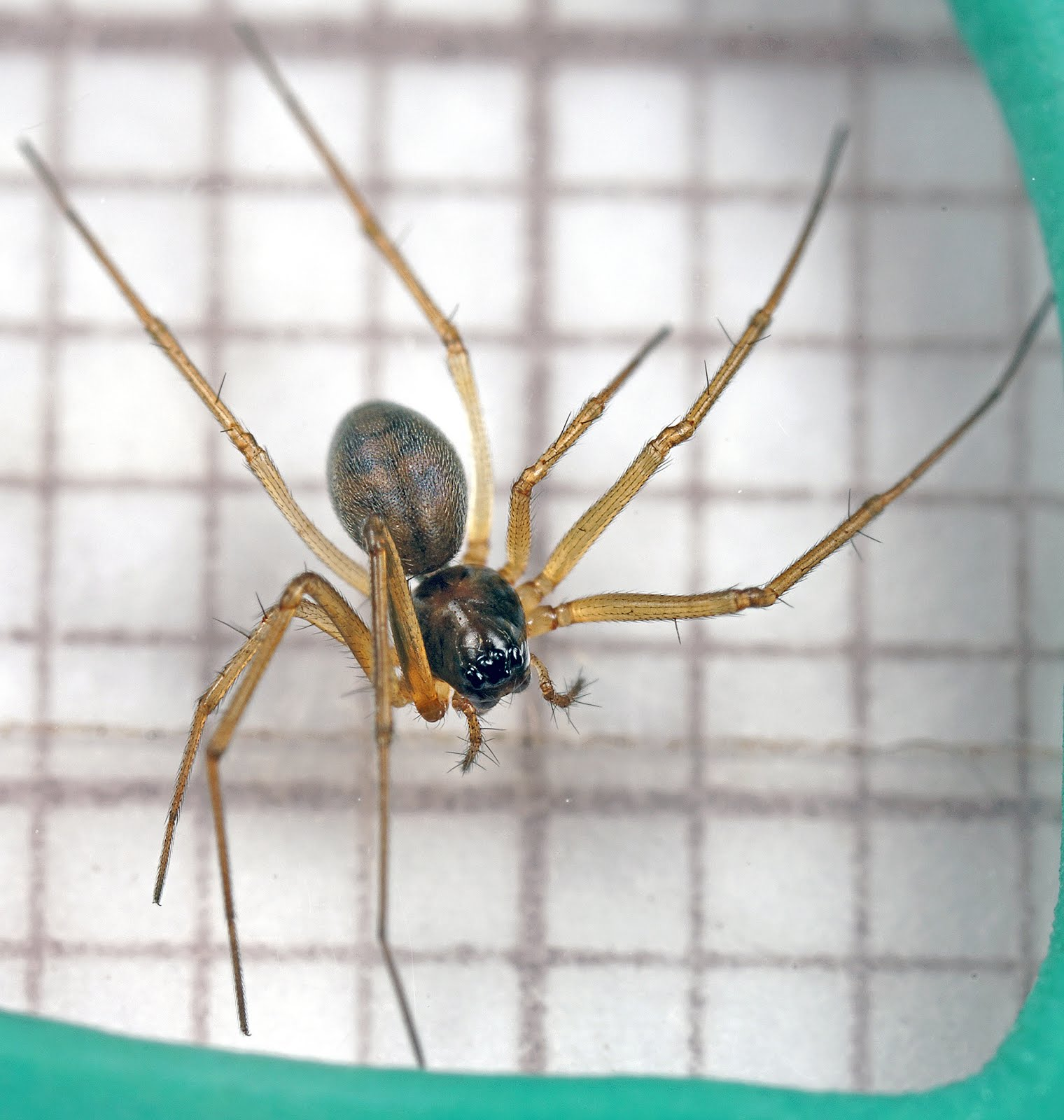

Scientific classification
- Domain: Eukaryota
- Kingdom: Animalia
- Phylum: Arthropoda
- Subphylum: Chelicerata
- Class: Arachnida
- Order: Araneae
- Infraorder: Araneomorphae
- Family: Linyphiidae
- Genus: Kaestneria
- Species: K. pullata

Binomial name
- Kaestneria pullata (O. P.-Cambridge, 1863)

= Kaestneria pullata =

Species of spider

Kaestneria pullata is a species of sheetweb spider in the family Linyphiidae. It is found in North America, Europe, a range from Russia (European to the Far East), China, Mongolia, and Japan.
