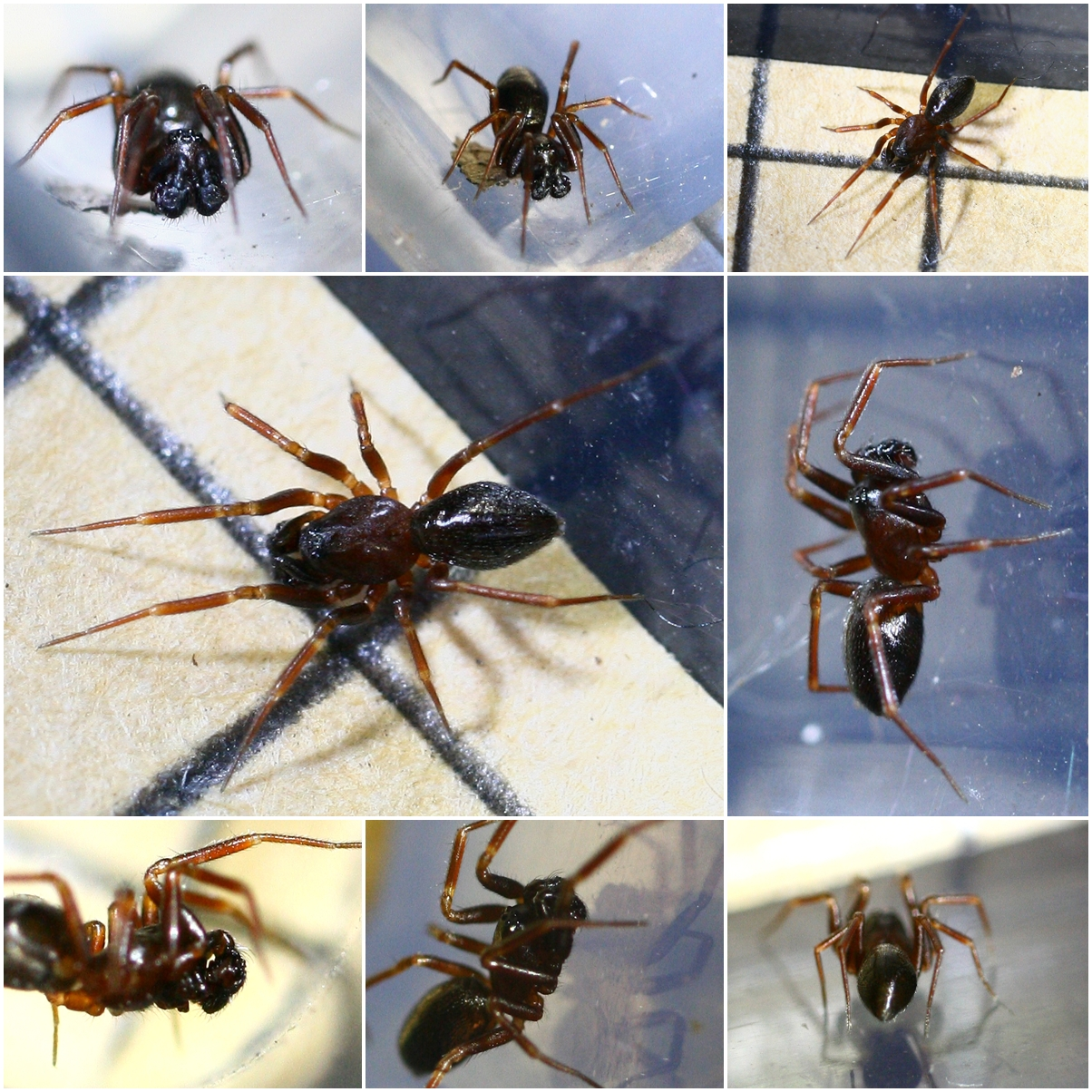

Scientific classification
- Domain: Eukaryota
- Kingdom: Animalia
- Phylum: Arthropoda
- Subphylum: Chelicerata
- Class: Arachnida
- Order: Araneae
- Infraorder: Araneomorphae
- Family: Linyphiidae
- Genus: Microneta
- Species: M. viaria

Binomial name
- Microneta viaria (Blackwall, 1841)

= Microneta viaria =

Species of spider

Microneta viaria is a species of sheetweb spider in the family Linyphiidae. It is found in North America, Europe, Turkey, North Africa, the Caucasus, a range within Russia (European to Far East), China, Mongolia, Korea, and Japan.
