= Baryphyma trifrons =

Conservation status
- Secure (NatureServe)

Scientific classification
- Kingdom: Animalia
- Phylum: Arthropoda
- Subphylum: Chelicerata
- Class: Arachnida
- Order: Araneae
- Infraorder: Araneomorphae
- Family: Linyphiidae
- Genus: Baryphyma
- Species: B. trifrons

Binomial name
- Baryphyma trifrons (O. P.-Cambridge, 1863)

Species of spider

Baryphyma trifrons is a species of dwarf spider in the family Linyphiidae. It is found in North America, Europe, the Caucasus, and in a range from Russian Europe to the Far East).

== Subspecies ==
These two subspecies belong to the species Baryphyma trifrons:

- Baryphyma trifrons affine (Schenkel, 1930)^{i}
- Baryphyma trifrons trifrons (O. P.-Cambridge, 1863)^{i}

Data sources: i = ITIS, c = Catalogue of Life, g = GBIF, b = Bugguide.net
