= Schizothecium vesticola =

Scientific classification
- Domain: Eukaryota
- Kingdom: Fungi
- Division: Ascomycota
- Class: Sordariomycetes
- Order: Sordariales
- Family: Lasiosphaeriaceae
- Genus: Schizothecium
- Species: S. vesticola

Binomial name
- Schizothecium vesticola (Berk. & Broome) N.Lundq.

Species of fungi

Schizothecium vesticola is a species of coprophilous fungus in the family Lasiosphaeriaceae. In Greece, it is known to grow in the dung of goats and possibly on that of sheep, goats and donkeys. In Iceland, it has been reported from the dung of sheep, goose and horse.
