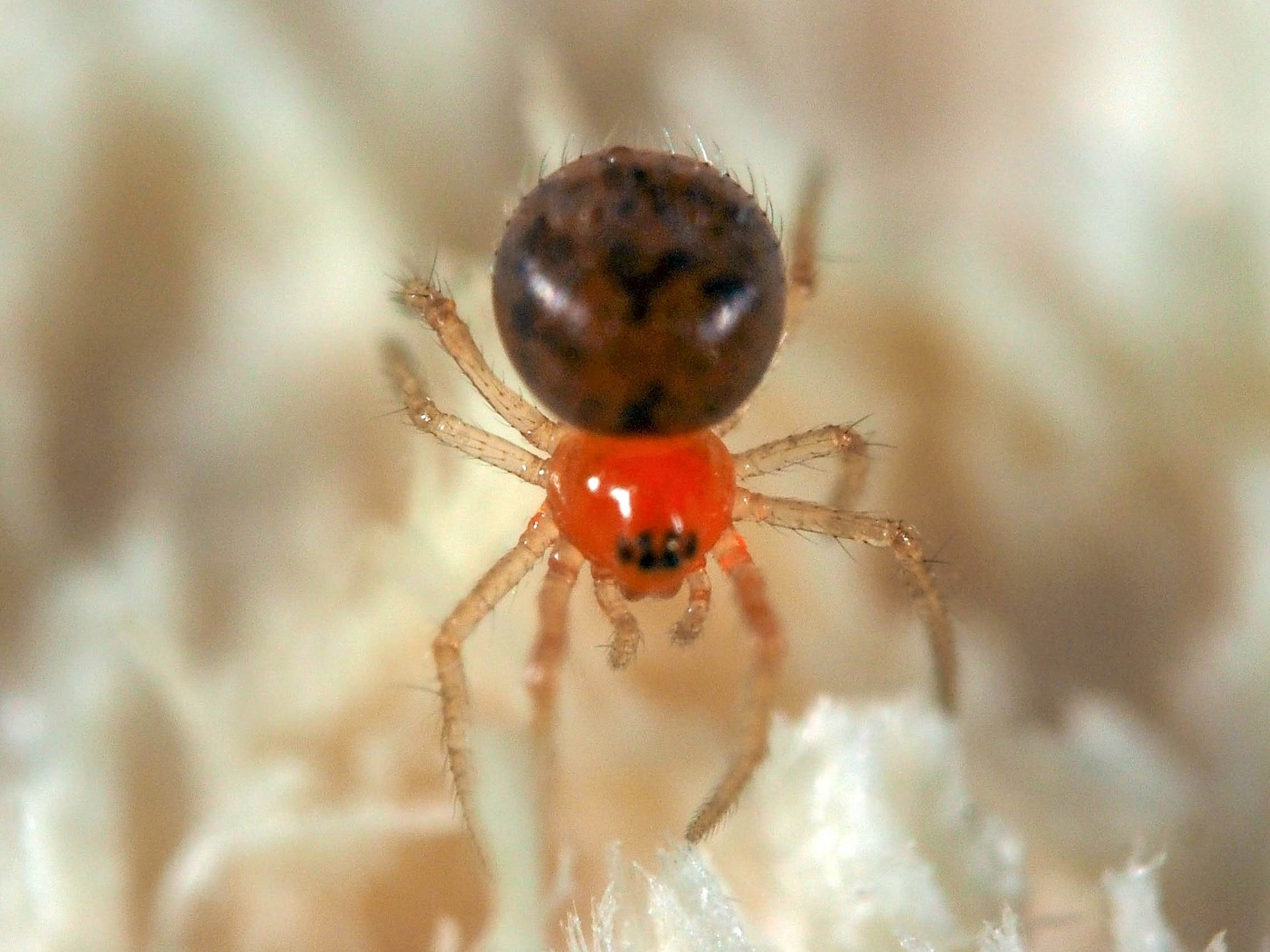

Scientific classification
- Kingdom: Animalia
- Phylum: Arthropoda
- Subphylum: Chelicerata
- Class: Arachnida
- Order: Araneae
- Infraorder: Araneomorphae
- Family: Theridiidae
- Genus: Ruborridion; Wunderlich, 2011
- Species: R. musivum

Binomial name
- Ruborridion musivum (Simon, 1873)

= Ruborridion =

Ruborridion musivum

Monotypic genus of spiders

Ruborridion is a monotypic genus of Asian comb-footed spiders containing the single species, Ruborridion musivum. The species was first described under the name Theridion musivum in 1873. The genus was described by J. Wunderlich in 2011. They are found in India and in the mediterranean area (southern Europe, north Africa)
