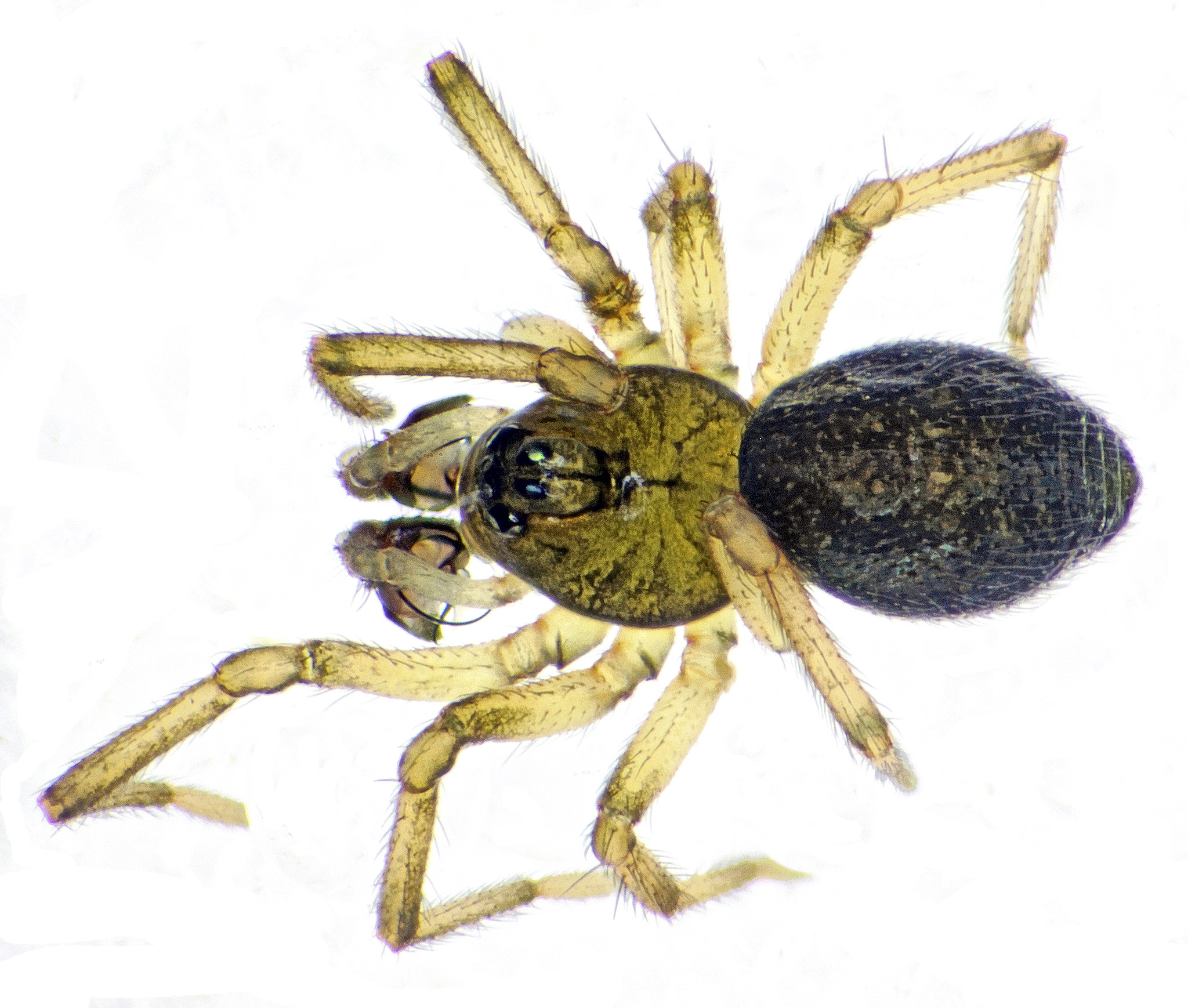
- Male

Scientific classification
- Domain: Eukaryota
- Kingdom: Animalia
- Phylum: Arthropoda
- Subphylum: Chelicerata
- Class: Arachnida
- Order: Araneae
- Infraorder: Araneomorphae
- Family: Linyphiidae
- Genus: Pocadicnemis
- Species: P. pumila

Binomial name
- Pocadicnemis pumila (Blackwall, 1841)

= Pocadicnemis pumila =

Species of spider

Pocadicnemis pumila is a species of dwarf spider in the family Linyphiidae. It is found in North America, Europe, Turkey, Caucasus, a range from Russia (European to Far East), and Japan.
