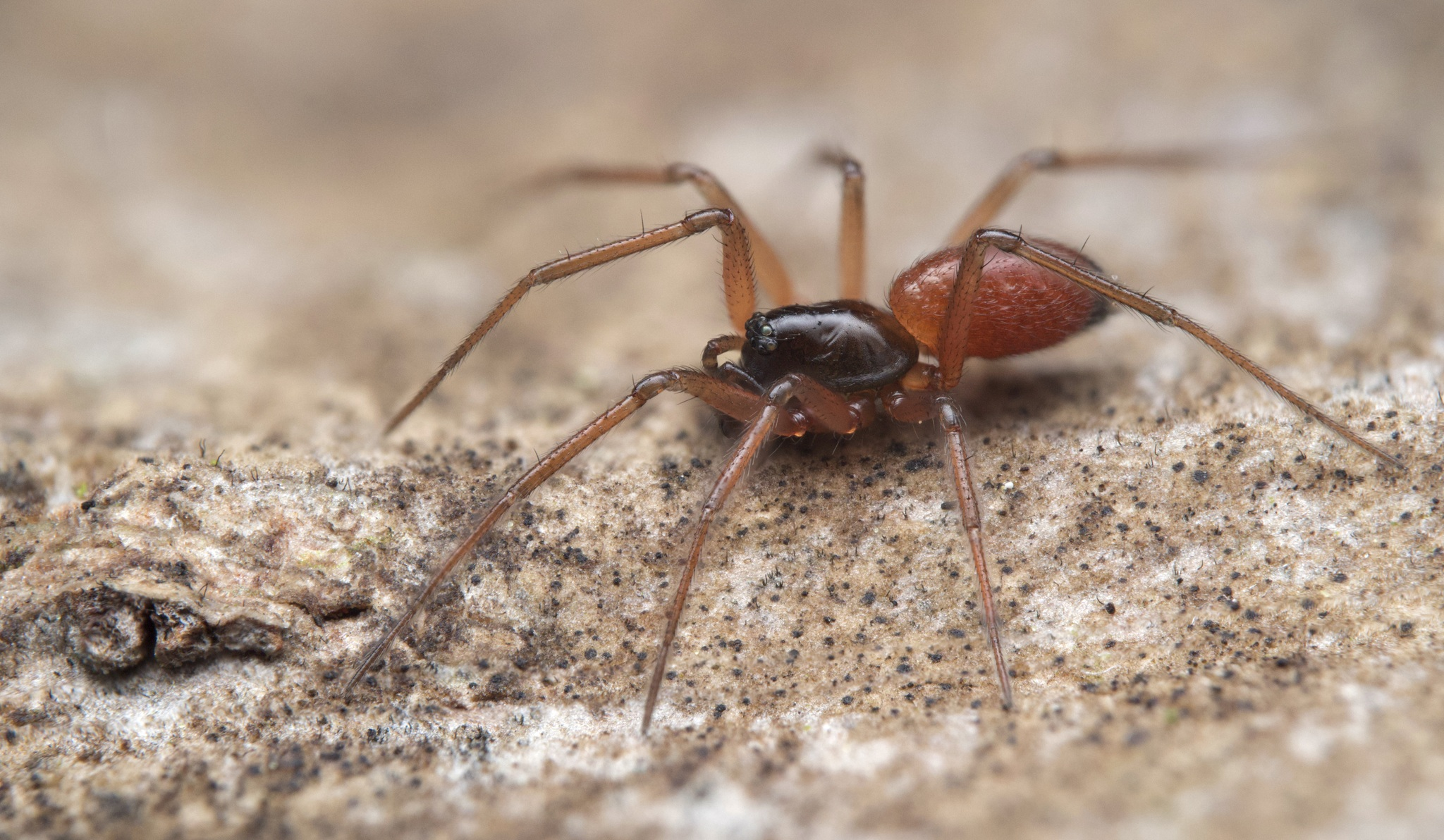
- O. melanopygius
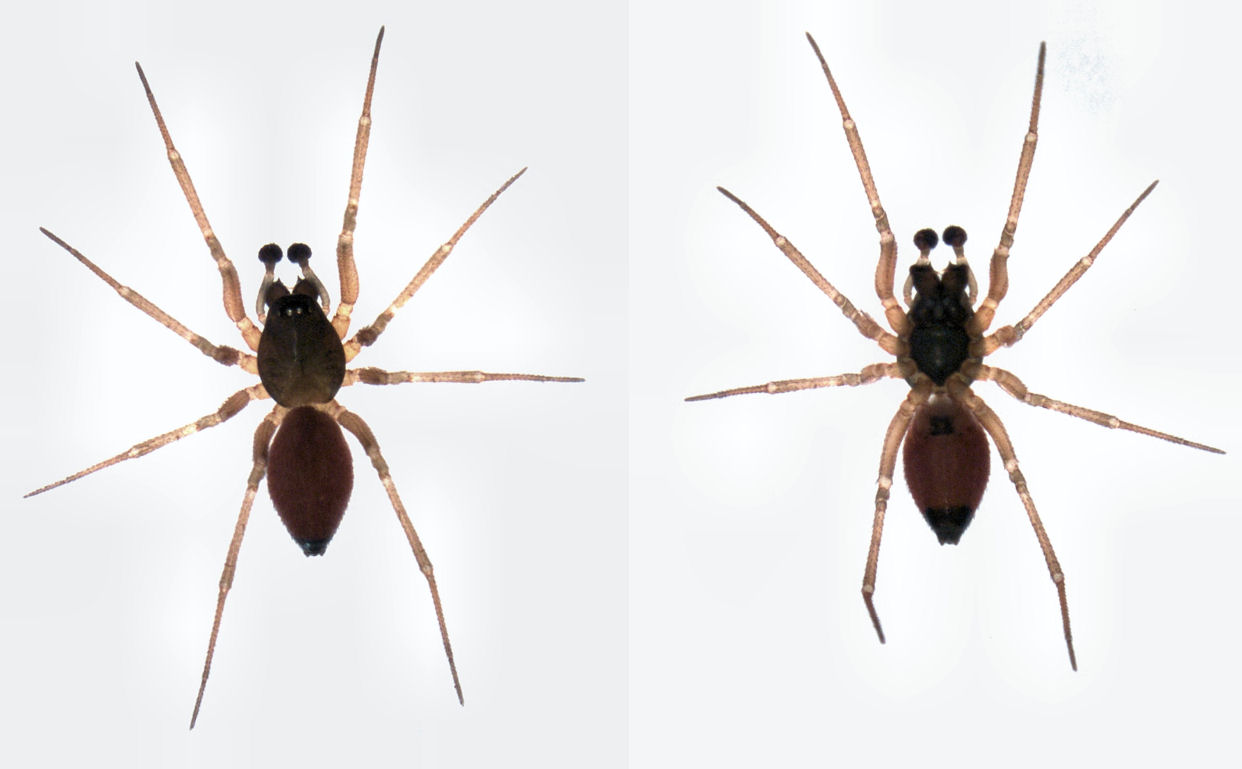
- male O. melanopygius

Scientific classification
- Kingdom: Animalia
- Phylum: Arthropoda
- Subphylum: Chelicerata
- Class: Arachnida
- Order: Araneae
- Infraorder: Araneomorphae
- Family: Linyphiidae
- Genus: Ostearius
- Species: O. melanopygius

Binomial name
- Ostearius melanopygius (O. P.-Cambridge, 1879)

= Ostearius melanopygius =

Species of spider

Ostearius melanopygius is a species of sheetweb spider in the family Linyphiidae. It is found in South America, and within a range from the Canary Islands to Egypt and Turkey, South Africa, China, and New Zealand. It has been introduced into Europe, as well.

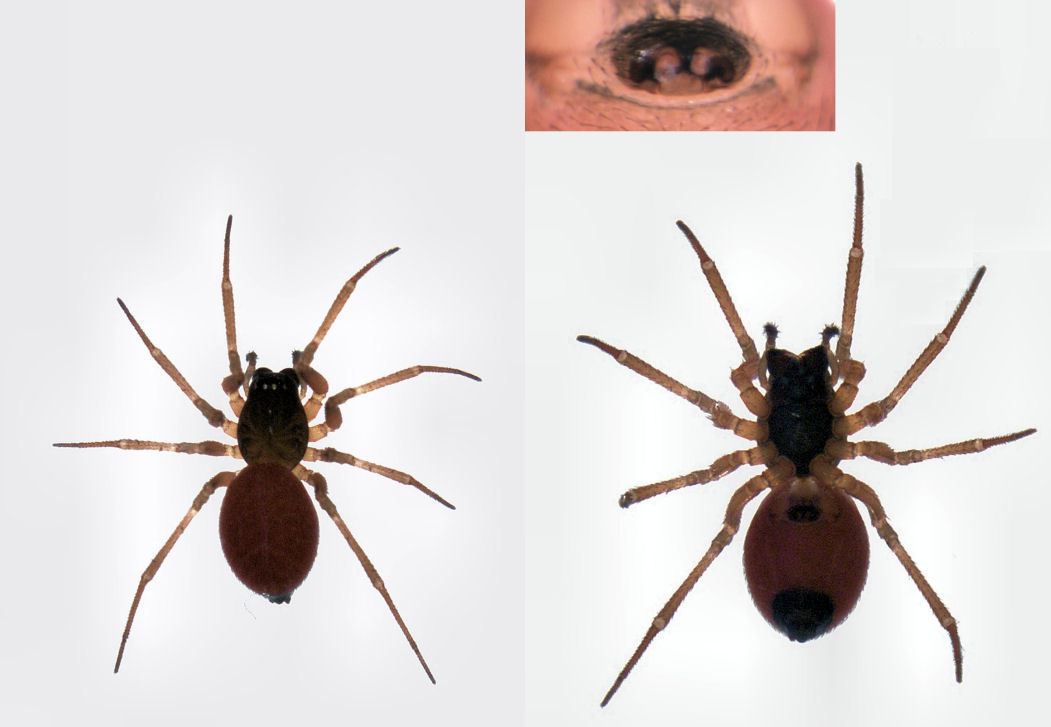
female
