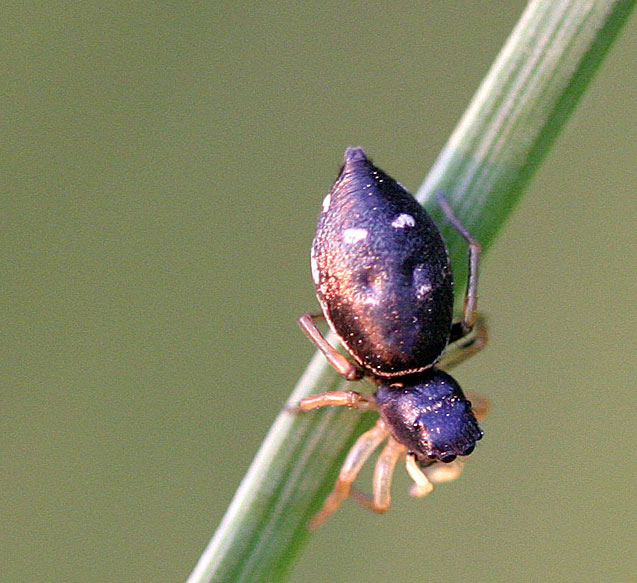
- Female
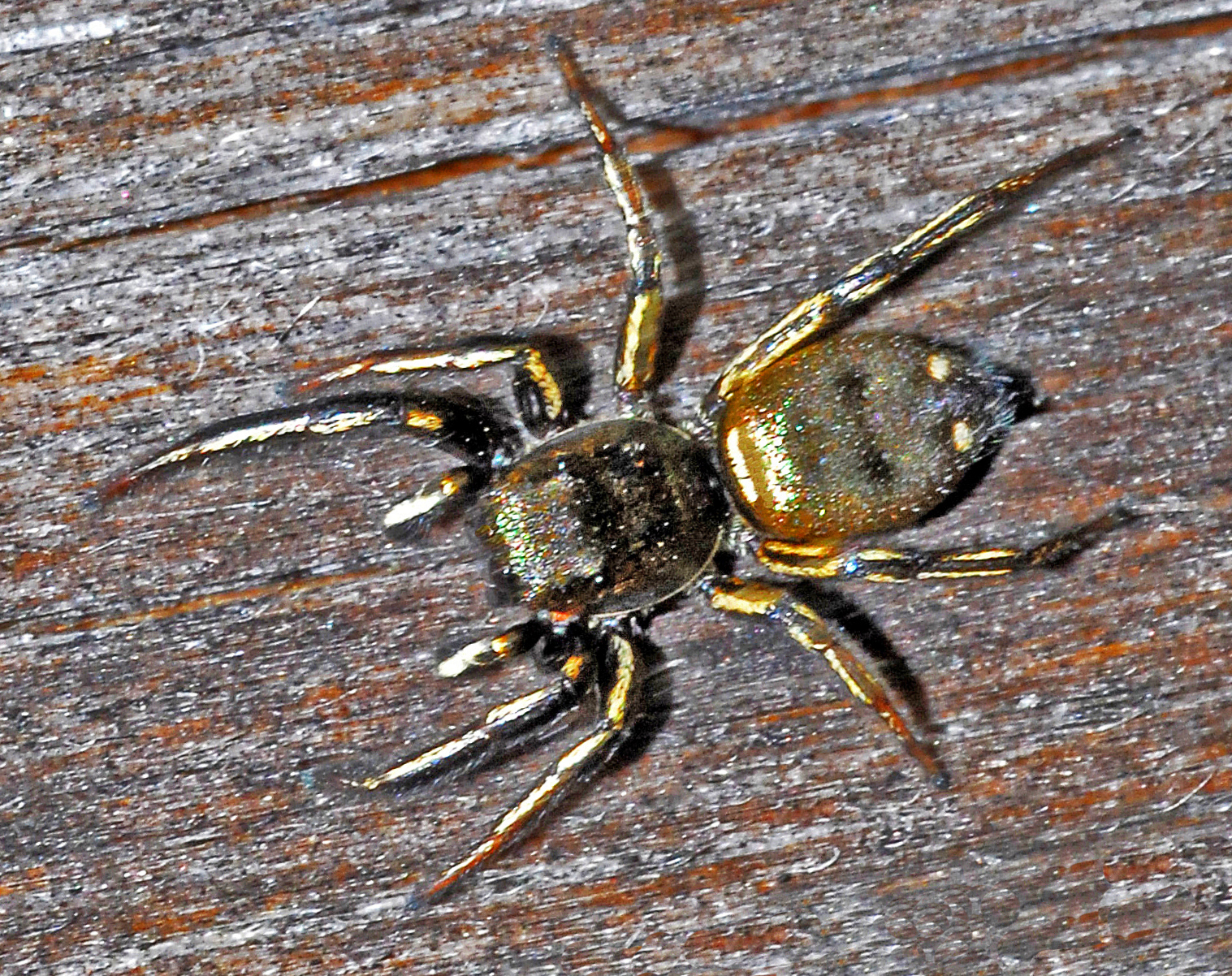
- Male

Scientific classification
- Kingdom: Animalia
- Phylum: Arthropoda
- Subphylum: Chelicerata
- Class: Arachnida
- Order: Araneae
- Infraorder: Araneomorphae
- Family: Salticidae
- Genus: Heliophanus
- Species: H. cupreus

Binomial name
- Heliophanus cupreus Walckenaer, 1802

Synonyms
- List: Aranea cuprea Walckenaer, 1802; Aranea aenea Schrank, 1803; Attus cupreus (Walckenaer, 1802); Attus atrovirens Sundevall, 1833; Salticus chalybeus Hahn, 1834; Salticus cupreus (Walckenaer, 1802); Heliophanus chalybeus (Hahn, 1834); Heliophanus tricinctus C. L. Koch, 1837; Heliophanus micans C. L. Koch, 1837; Heliophanus metallicus C. L. Koch, 1846

= Heliophanus cupreus =

Species of spider

Heliophanus cupreus, the copper sun jumper, is a species of jumping spider belonging to the family Salticidae.

== Subspecies ==
Subspecies include:

- Heliophanus cupreus cuprescens (Simon, 1868)
- Heliophanus cupreus globifer (Simon, 1868)

== Distribution ==
Heliophanus cupreus has a Palearctic distribution, being found throughout Europe except Iceland. It is alco present in North Africa, Turkey, Caucasus, Russia (Europe to West Siberia), Iran and China. In Great Britain it has a scattered distribution as far north as central Scotland where it is normally a coastal species.

== Habitat and ecology ==
Heliophanus cupreus has been collected from a wide variety of habitat types such as woodlands, grasslands, raised bogs, coastal cliffs and shingle beaches, as well as disturbed habitats such as wastelands and quarries. Within its varied habitats, Heliophanus cupreus is commonly encountered in the drier locations. It is occasionally observed to be active on the surface but is more commonly found within the litter. In northern Great Britain Heliophanus cupreus seems to require sunny conditions. When resting, Heliophanus cupreus may be found in a silken cell placed either under stones or within the litter.

== Description ==
male

female variations

all drawings from Koch (1848)

Heliophanus cupreus can reach a body length of about 3.6–4 mm (0.14–0.16 in) in males, of 4.6–5.8 mm (0.18–0.23 in) in females. These spiders have a dark, blackish body, with a metallic sheen. On the female the pedipalps are yellow or light brown and contrast with her overall appearance. Furthermore the prosoma is usually crossed by a white line behind the eyes and the abdomen is circled with a white line, with white dots above.

The male has dark palps with white squamose hairs on front. The tibial apophysis has a fine, long, pointed, hook-shaped process. The male has a long palpal bulb. The cephalothorax is black with a metallic sheen and has white hairs, towards the front bright and on some individuals there are 1-2 bright pairs of spots to the rear.

Legs are light yellow, with black longitudinal stripes, although some individuals may have uniformly dark legs. The opisthosoma is grey-black, again with a metallic sheen and white hairs.

== Biology ==
The adults of both sexes are found mainly in May, June and July and females may persist into the autumn.
