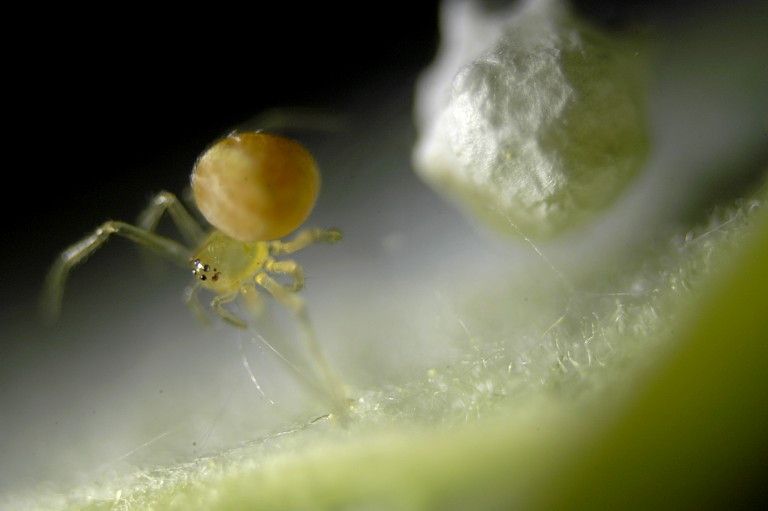

Scientific classification
- Domain: Eukaryota
- Kingdom: Animalia
- Phylum: Arthropoda
- Subphylum: Chelicerata
- Class: Arachnida
- Order: Araneae
- Infraorder: Araneomorphae
- Family: Theridiidae
- Genus: Paidiscura
- Species: P. pallens

Binomial name
- Paidiscura pallens (Blackwall, 1834)

= Paidiscura pallens =

Species of spider

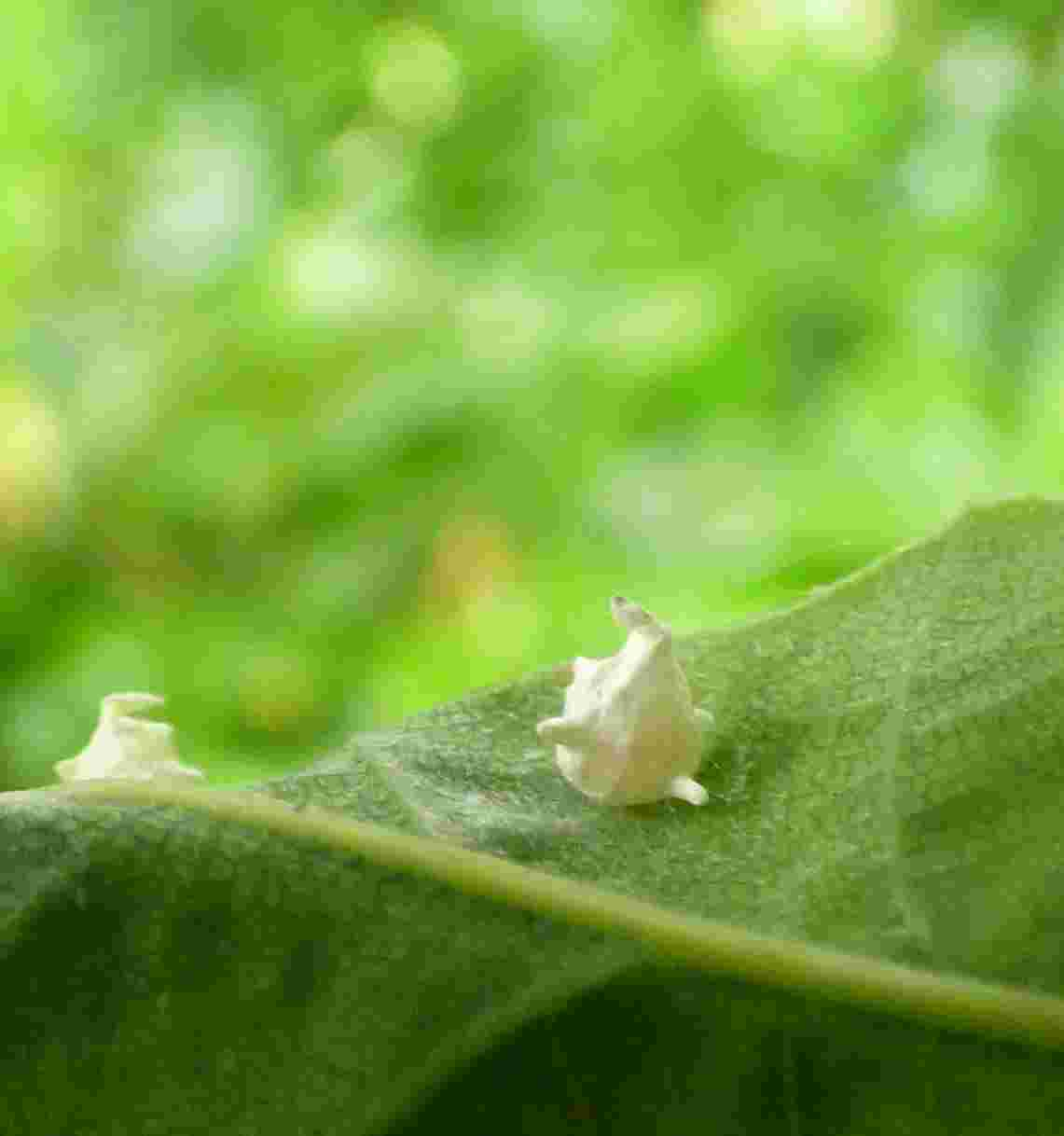

Paidiscura pallens is a species of comb-footed spider in the family Theridiidae. It is found in the Mediterranean, Middle East, the Caucasus and Great Britain. Females of this species make distinctive white sputnik shaped egg cocoons, usually on oak leaves, and often remain nearby.
