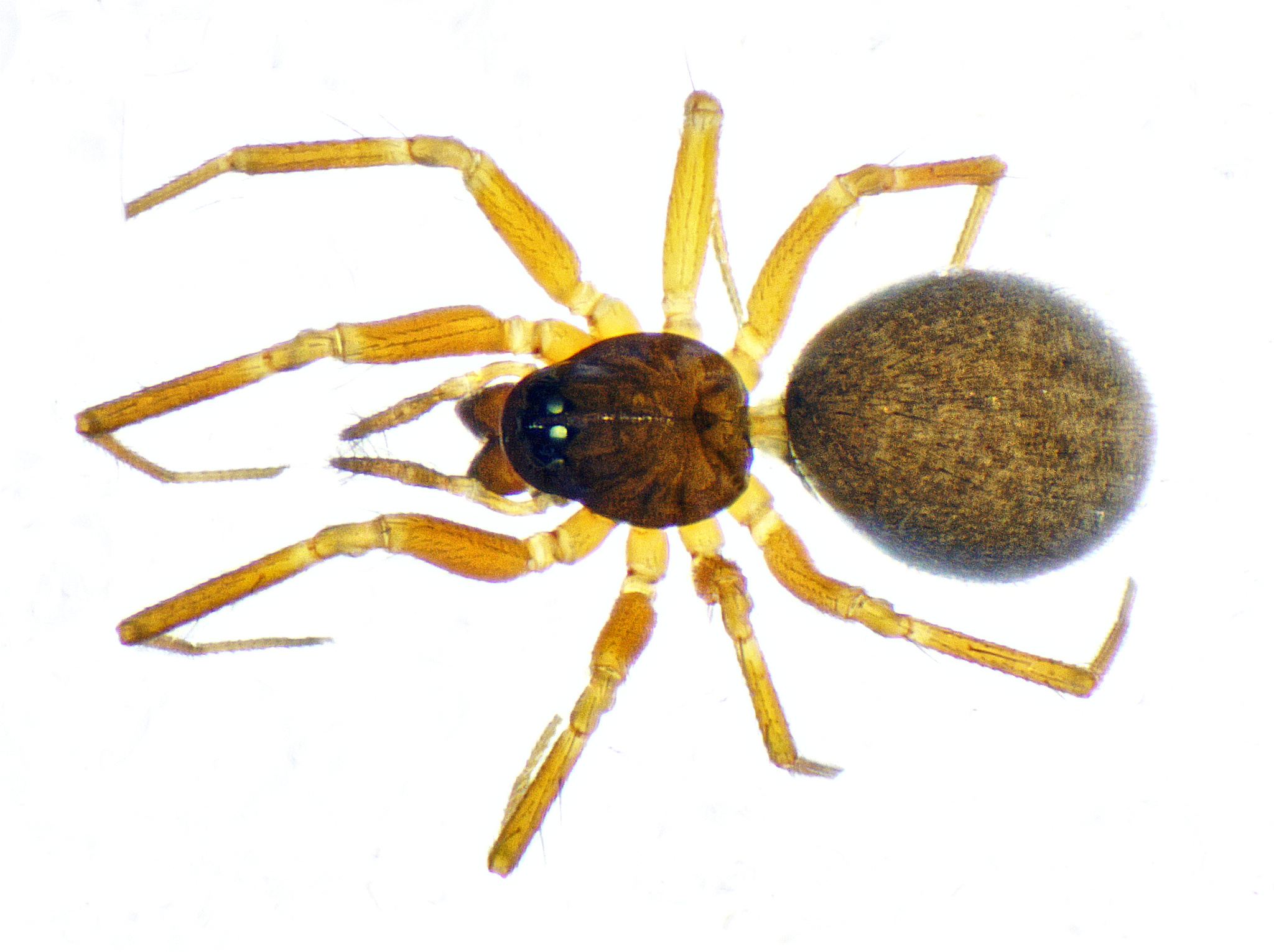

Scientific classification
- Domain: Eukaryota
- Kingdom: Animalia
- Phylum: Arthropoda
- Subphylum: Chelicerata
- Class: Arachnida
- Order: Araneae
- Infraorder: Araneomorphae
- Family: Linyphiidae
- Genus: Centromerita
- Species: C. bicolor

Binomial name
- Centromerita bicolor (Blackwall, 1833)

= Centromerita bicolor =

Species of spider

Centromerita bicolor is a species of sheetweb spider in the family Linyphiidae. It is found in the United States, Canada, and Europe.
