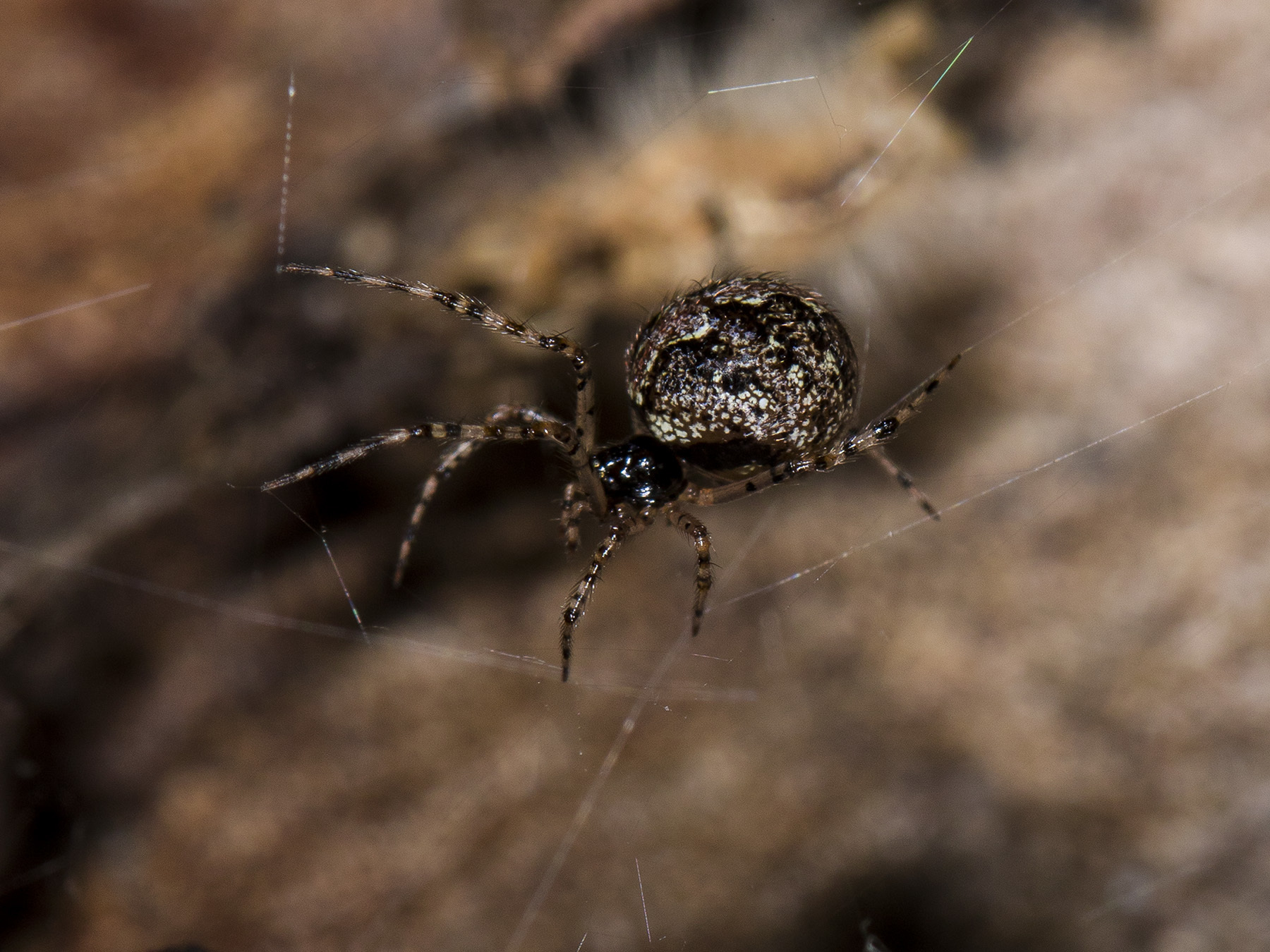

Scientific classification
- Kingdom: Animalia
- Phylum: Arthropoda
- Subphylum: Chelicerata
- Class: Arachnida
- Order: Araneae
- Infraorder: Araneomorphae
- Family: Theridiidae
- Genus: Theridion
- Species: T. melanurum

Binomial name
- Theridion melanurum Hahn, 1831

= Theridion melanurum =

Species of spider

Theridion melanurum is a species of cobweb spider in the family Theridiidae. It is found in a range from Europe to Siberia, Macaronesia, North Africa, Middle East, and has been introduced into the United States.
