= Heliophanus berlandi =

Scientific classification
- Kingdom: Animalia
- Phylum: Arthropoda
- Subphylum: Chelicerata
- Class: Arachnida
- Order: Araneae
- Infraorder: Araneomorphae
- Family: Salticidae
- Genus: Heliophanus
- Species: H. berlandi

Binomial name
- Heliophanus berlandi Lawrence, 1937

Species of spider

Heliophanus berlandi is a species of jumping spider in the genus Heliophanus that lives in South Africa. The female was first described in 1937.
