= Heliophanus dux =

Scientific classification
- Kingdom: Animalia
- Phylum: Arthropoda
- Subphylum: Chelicerata
- Class: Arachnida
- Order: Araneae
- Infraorder: Araneomorphae
- Family: Salticidae
- Genus: Heliophanus
- Species: H. dux

Binomial name
- Heliophanus dux Wesołowska & van Harten, 1994

Species of jumping spider

Heliophanus dux is a species of jumping spider in the genus Heliophanus that lives in Yemen. The species was first described in 1994 by Wanda Wesołowska and Antonius van Harten.
