= Heliophanus transversus =

Scientific classification
- Kingdom: Animalia
- Phylum: Arthropoda
- Subphylum: Chelicerata
- Class: Arachnida
- Order: Araneae
- Infraorder: Araneomorphae
- Family: Salticidae
- Genus: Heliophanus
- Species: H. transversus

Binomial name
- Heliophanus transversus Wesołowska & Haddad, 2014

Species of spider

Heliophanus transversus is a species of jumping spiders in the genus Heliophanus that lives in Lesotho. It was first identified in 2014.
