= Heliophanus furvus =

Scientific classification
- Kingdom: Animalia
- Phylum: Arthropoda
- Subphylum: Chelicerata
- Class: Arachnida
- Order: Araneae
- Infraorder: Araneomorphae
- Family: Salticidae
- Genus: Heliophanus
- Species: H. furvus

Binomial name
- Heliophanus furvus Wesołowska & Haddad, 2014

Species of spider

Heliophanus furvus is a jumping spider species in the genus Heliophanus that lives in Lesotho. It was first identified in 2014.
