= Heliophanus xanthopes =

Scientific classification
- Kingdom: Animalia
- Phylum: Arthropoda
- Subphylum: Chelicerata
- Class: Arachnida
- Order: Araneae
- Infraorder: Araneomorphae
- Family: Salticidae
- Genus: Heliophanus
- Species: H. xanthopes

Binomial name
- Heliophanus xanthopes Wesołowska, 2003

Species of spider

Heliophanus xanthopes is a jumping spider species in the genus Heliophanus. It was first described by Wanda Wesołowska in 2003 and lives in Ethiopia.
