= Heliophanus chikangawanus =

Scientific classification
- Kingdom: Animalia
- Phylum: Arthropoda
- Subphylum: Chelicerata
- Class: Arachnida
- Order: Araneae
- Infraorder: Araneomorphae
- Family: Salticidae
- Genus: Heliophanus
- Species: H. chikangawanus

Binomial name
- Heliophanus chikangawanus Wesołowska, 1986

Species of spider

Heliophanus chikangawanus is a jumping spider species in the genus Heliophanus. It was first described by Wanda Wesołowska in 1986 and is found in Angola and Mali.
