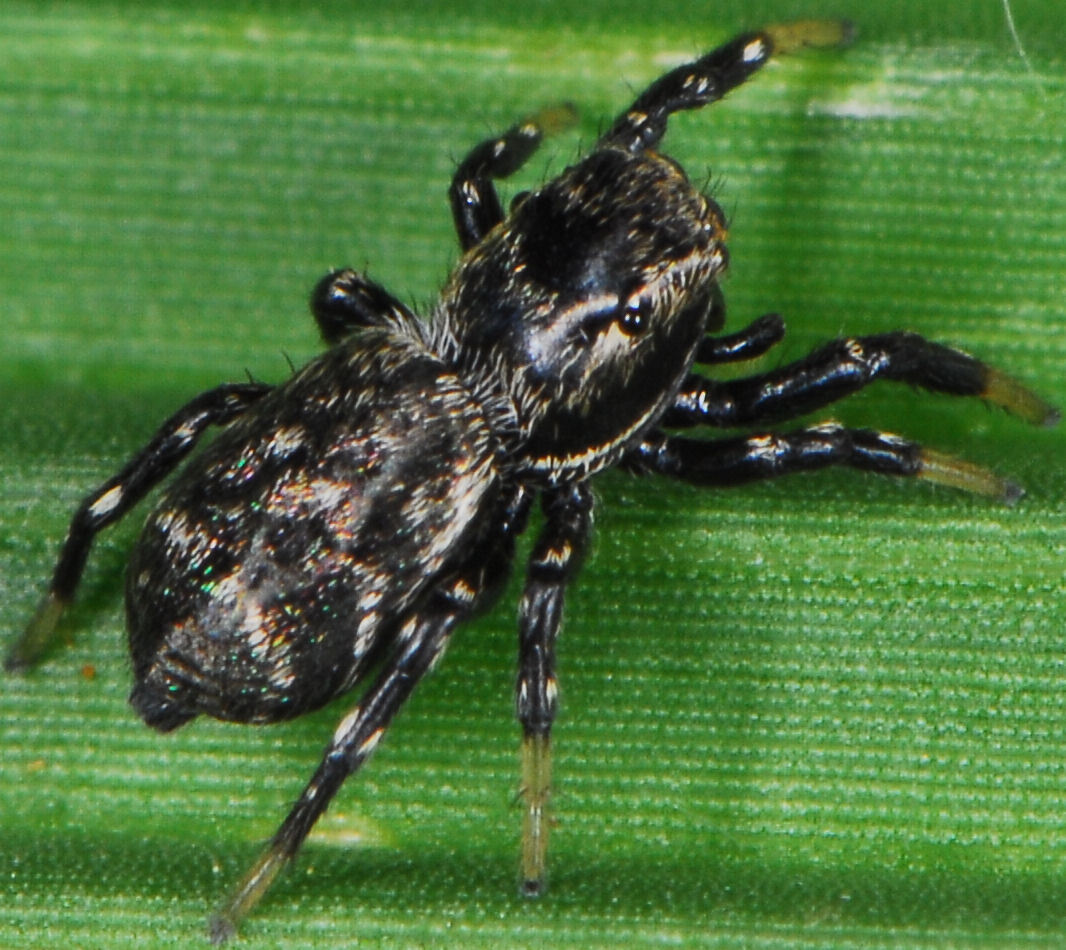
- juvenile female
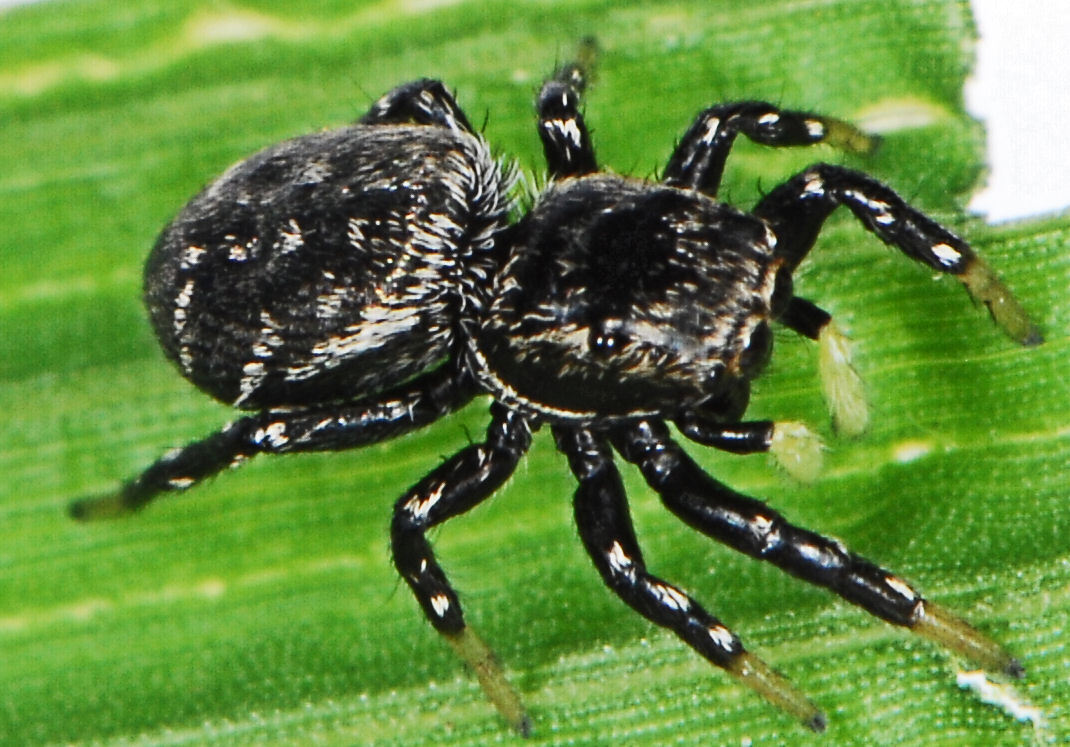
- juvenile female

Scientific classification
- Kingdom: Animalia
- Phylum: Arthropoda
- Subphylum: Chelicerata
- Class: Arachnida
- Order: Araneae
- Infraorder: Araneomorphae
- Family: Salticidae
- Genus: Heliophanus
- Species: H. africanus

Binomial name
- Heliophanus africanus Wesołowska, 1986

= Heliophanus africanus =

Gauteng Heliophanus Sunny Jumping Spider

Species of spider

Heliophanus africanus is a species of jumping spider in the family Salticidae. It is endemic to South Africa and is commonly known as the Gauteng Heliophanus sunny jumping spider.

== Distribution ==
Heliophanus africanus is endemic to South Africa, where it is found in Melville Koppies and Irene in Gauteng Province.

== Habitat and ecology ==
This species is a free-living plant-dweller sampled from the Grassland Biome. It has been found at altitudes ranging from 144 to 1719 m.

== Conservation ==
Heliophanus africanus is listed as Data Deficient by the South African National Biodiversity Institute due to limited sampling.The species is presently known only from two localities in Gauteng. Additional sampling is needed to collect the male and determine the species' range.

== Taxonomy ==
Heliophanus africanus was described by Wesołowska in 1986 from Melville Koppies in Gauteng.
