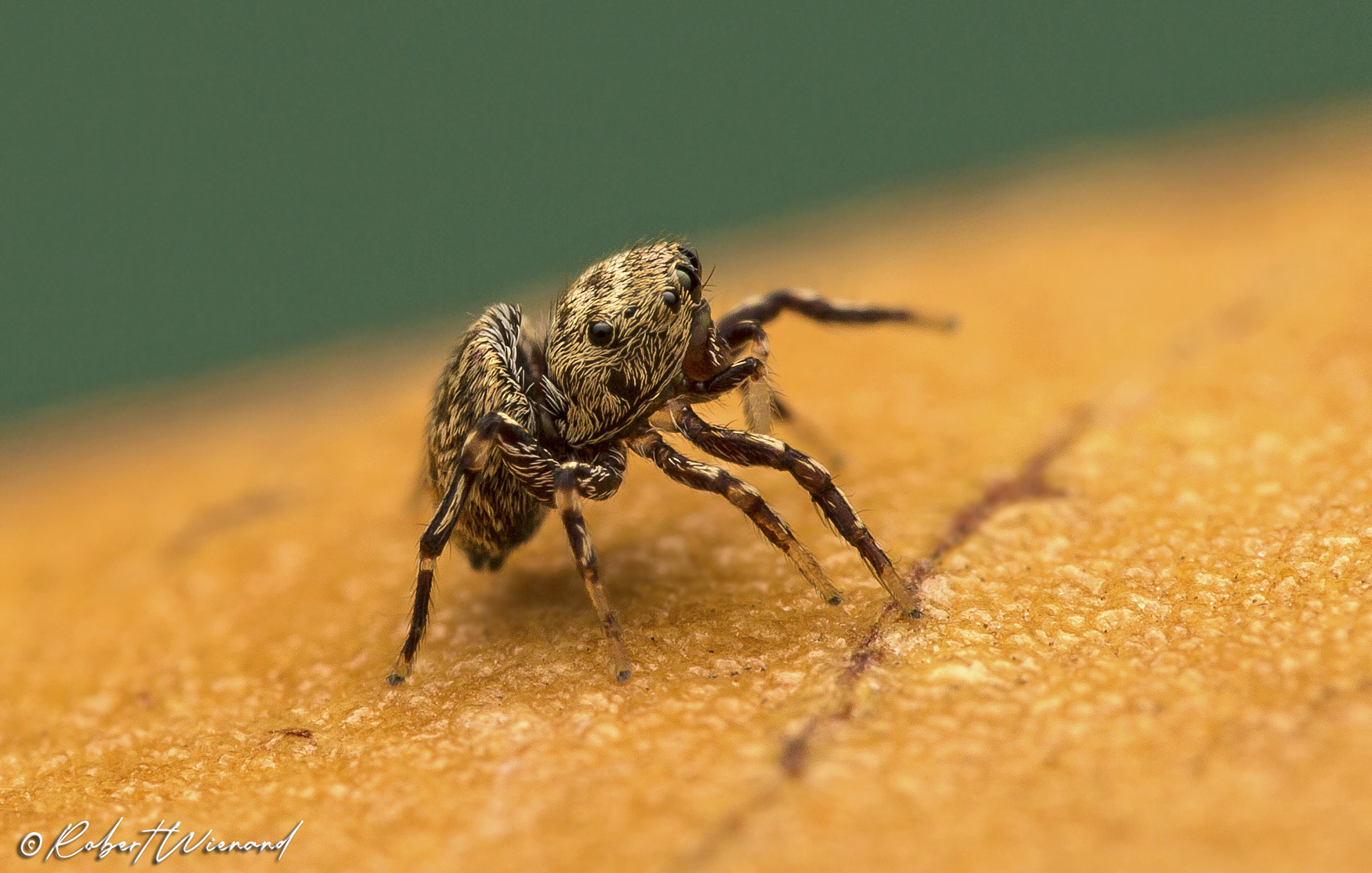

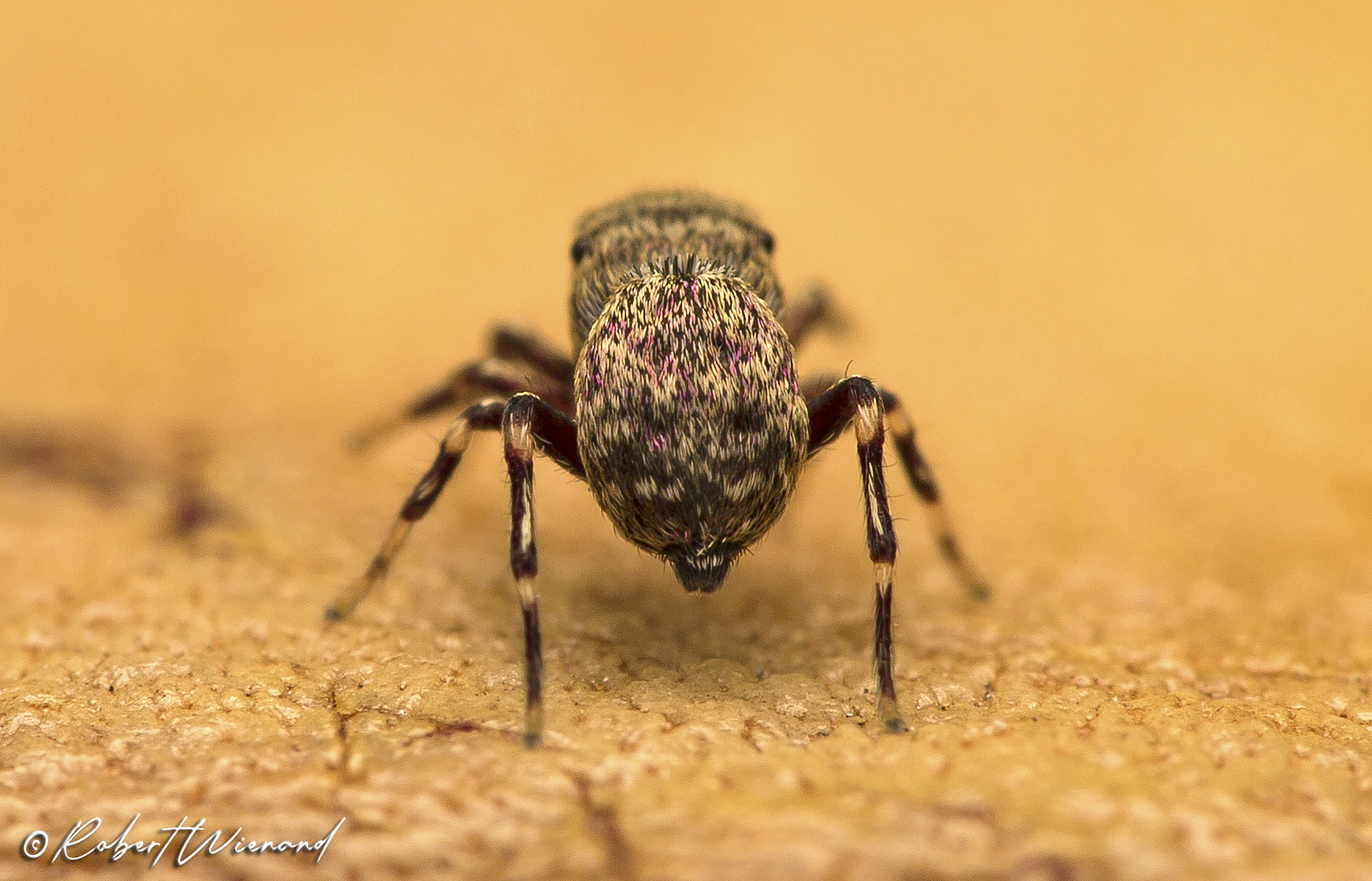

Scientific classification
- Kingdom: Animalia
- Phylum: Arthropoda
- Subphylum: Chelicerata
- Class: Arachnida
- Order: Araneae
- Infraorder: Araneomorphae
- Family: Salticidae
- Genus: Heliophanus
- Species: H. gramineus

Binomial name
- Heliophanus gramineus Wesołowska & Haddad, 2013

= Heliophanus gramineus =

Mottled Heliophanus Sunny Jumping Spider

Species of spider

Heliophanus gramineus is a species of jumping spider in the family Salticidae. It is endemic to South Africa and is commonly known as the mottled Heliophanus sunny jumping spider.

== Distribution ==
Heliophanus gramineus is found only in South Africa, where it has been sampled from Eastern Cape, KwaZulu-Natal, Limpopo, and Mpumalanga.

== Habitat and ecology ==
All known specimens were collected by beating vegetation, litter sifting and hand collecting, especially at the bases of grasses. The species has been sampled from the Grassland, Savanna and Thicket biomes at altitudes ranging from 120 to 1498 m.

== Description ==
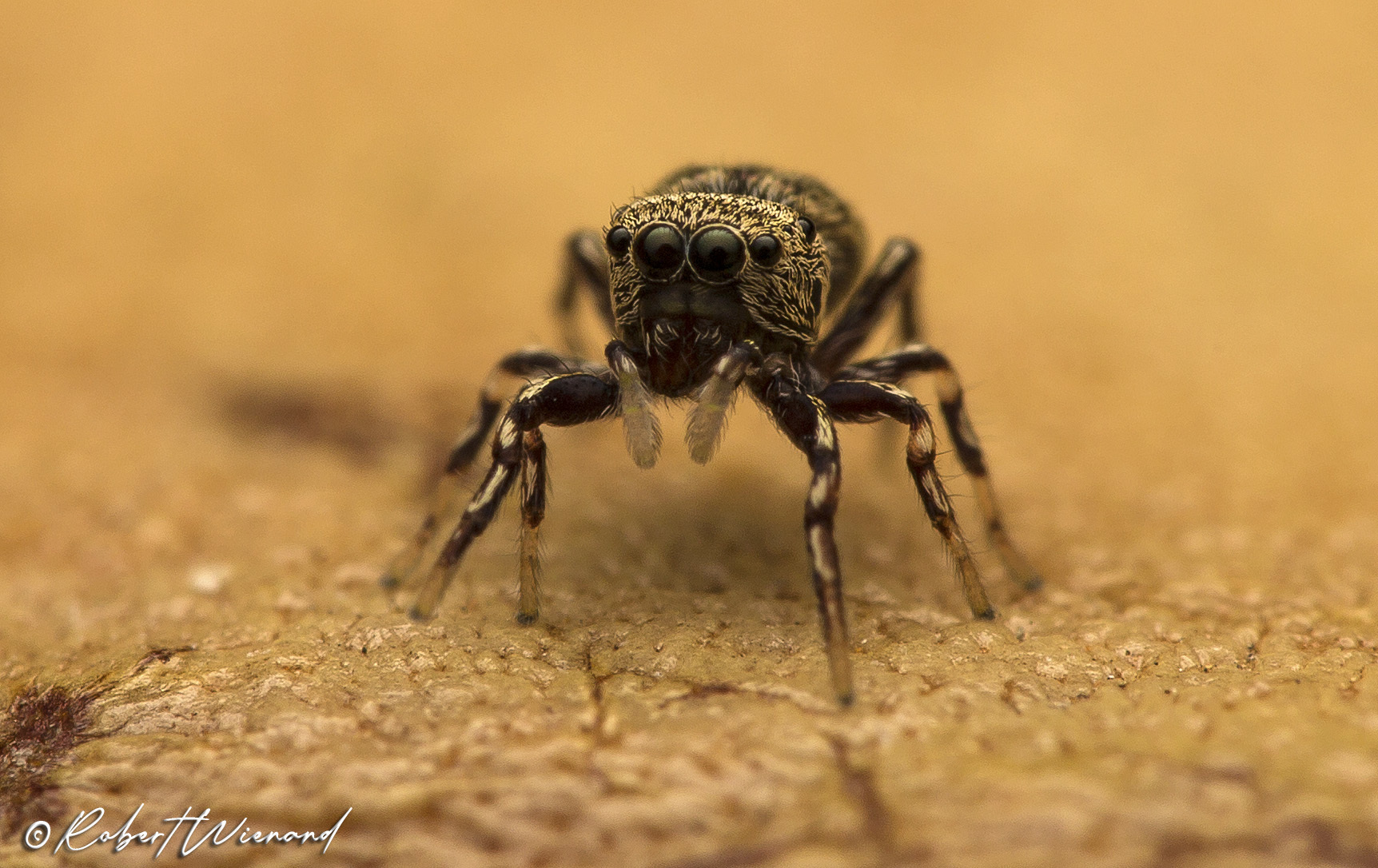

This species is distinctively coloured, with the abdomen being creamy-grey with transverse brown spots.

== Conservation ==
Heliophanus gramineus is listed as of Least Concern by the South African National Biodiversity Institute due to its wide geographical range. There are no known threats to the species. It is protected in five protected areas in South Africa.

== Taxonomy ==
The female of Heliophanus gramineus was described by Wesołowska and Haddad in 2013 from Hogsback in Eastern Cape. The male was described by the same authors in 2018.
