= Heliophanus comorensis =

Scientific classification
- Kingdom: Animalia
- Phylum: Arthropoda
- Subphylum: Chelicerata
- Class: Arachnida
- Order: Araneae
- Infraorder: Araneomorphae
- Family: Salticidae
- Genus: Heliophanus
- Species: H. comorensis

Binomial name
- Heliophanus comorensis Dierkens, 2012

Species of spider

Heliophanus comorensis is a jumping spider species in the genus Heliophanus. It was first described in 2012 and is found in the Comoro Islands.
