= Heliophanus minimus =

Scientific classification
- Kingdom: Animalia
- Phylum: Arthropoda
- Subphylum: Chelicerata
- Class: Arachnida
- Order: Araneae
- Infraorder: Araneomorphae
- Family: Salticidae
- Genus: Heliophanus
- Species: H. minimus

Binomial name
- Heliophanus minimus Wesołowska & Russell-Smith, 2022

Species of spider

Heliophanus minimus is a jumping spider species in the genus Heliophanus that lives in Ivory Coast.
