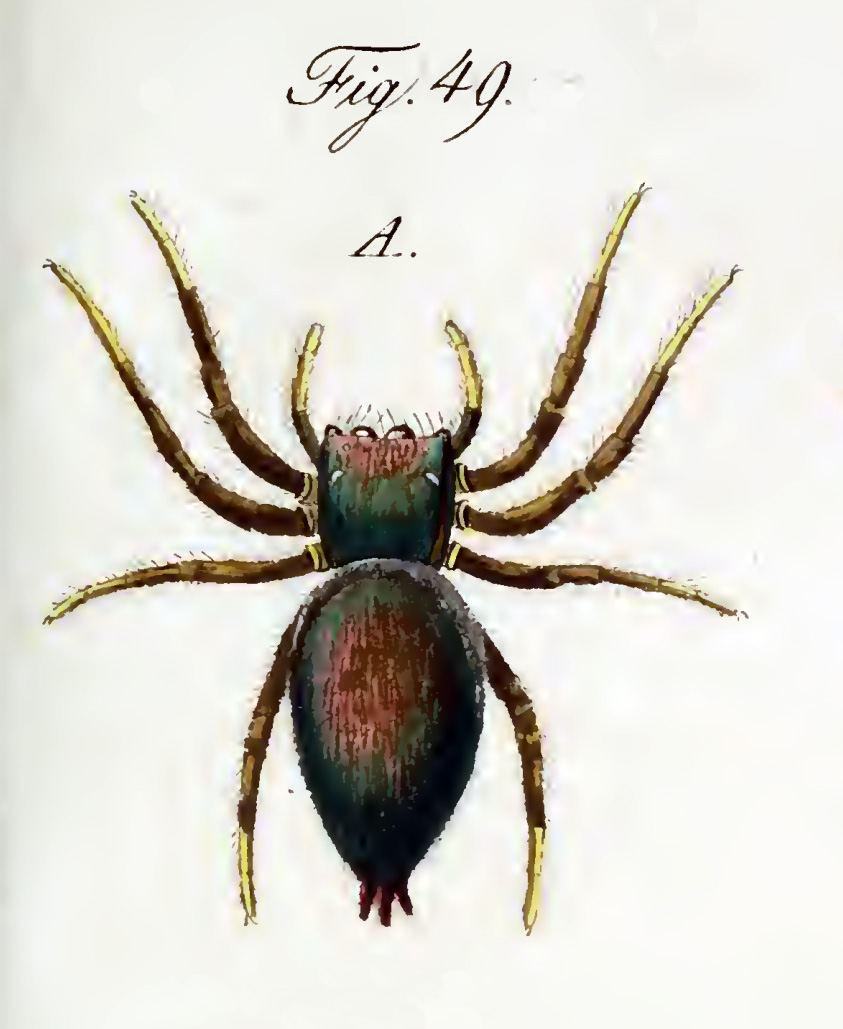
- Hahn's drawing of female
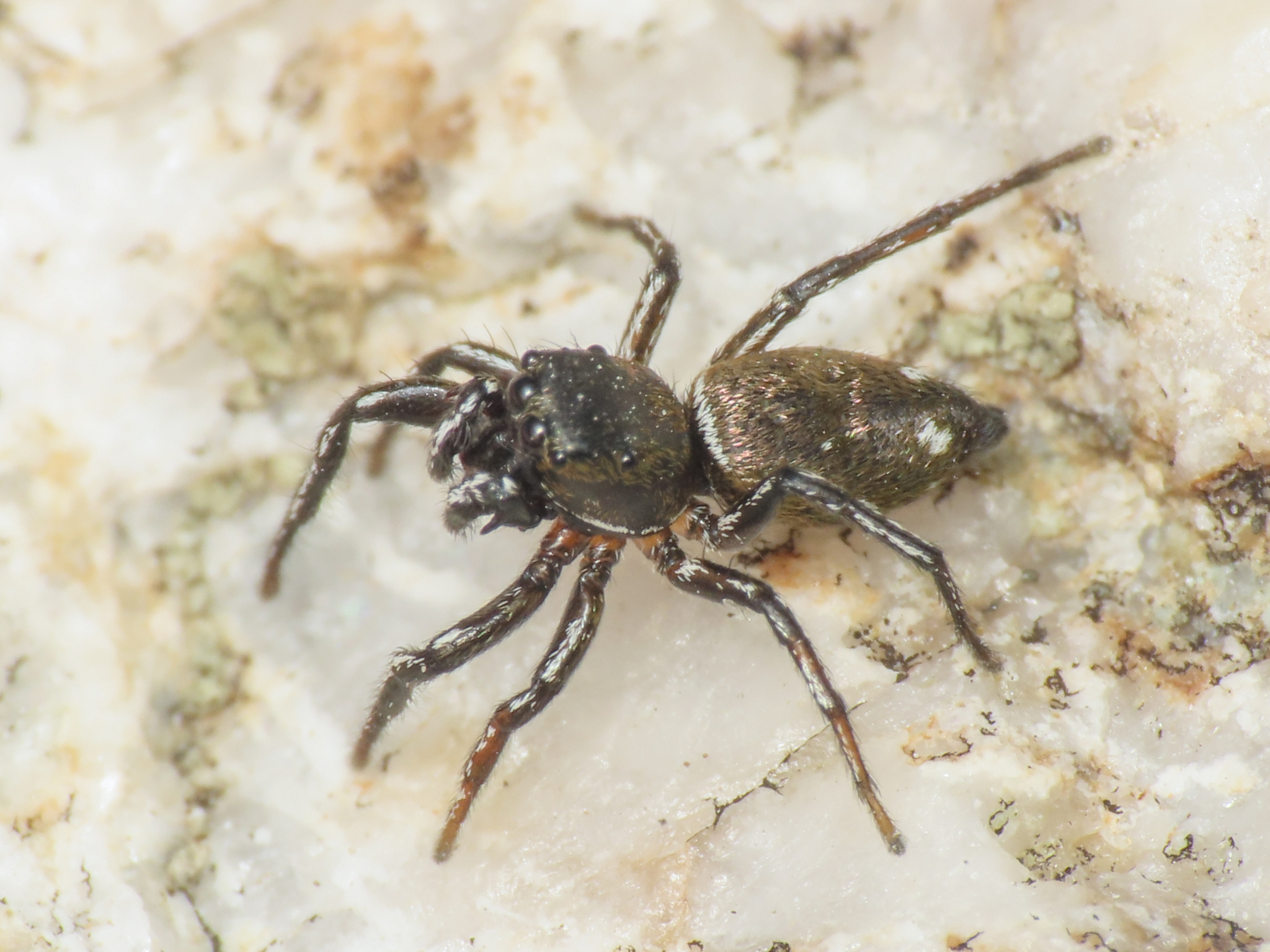
- male from Italy

Scientific classification
- Kingdom: Animalia
- Phylum: Arthropoda
- Subphylum: Chelicerata
- Class: Arachnida
- Order: Araneae
- Infraorder: Araneomorphae
- Family: Salticidae
- Genus: Heliophanus
- Species: H. aeneus

Binomial name
- Heliophanus aeneus (Hahn, 1832)

Synonyms
- Salticus aeneus Hahn, 1832; Heliophanus inornatus Simon, 1868

= Heliophanus aeneus =

Species of jumping spider

Heliophanus aeneus is a species of jumping spider in the genus Heliophanus. It was first described by Carl Wilhelm Hahn in 1832 as Salticus aeneus and is found across the Palearctic realm.

== Etymology ==
The species name aeneus is derived from Latin, meaning "bronze-coloured" or "brass-coloured", referring to the metallic bronze appearance of the spider.

== Distribution ==
H. aeneus is widely distributed across Europe, Turkey, the Caucasus, and Central Asia. It has been recorded from numerous European countries and extends eastward into the Palearctic region.

== Habitat ==
This species is commonly found in gardens, on hedges, and among low bushes. It favours areas with vegetation where it can hunt for prey.

== Description ==
female (Koch 1848)

male (Koch 1848)

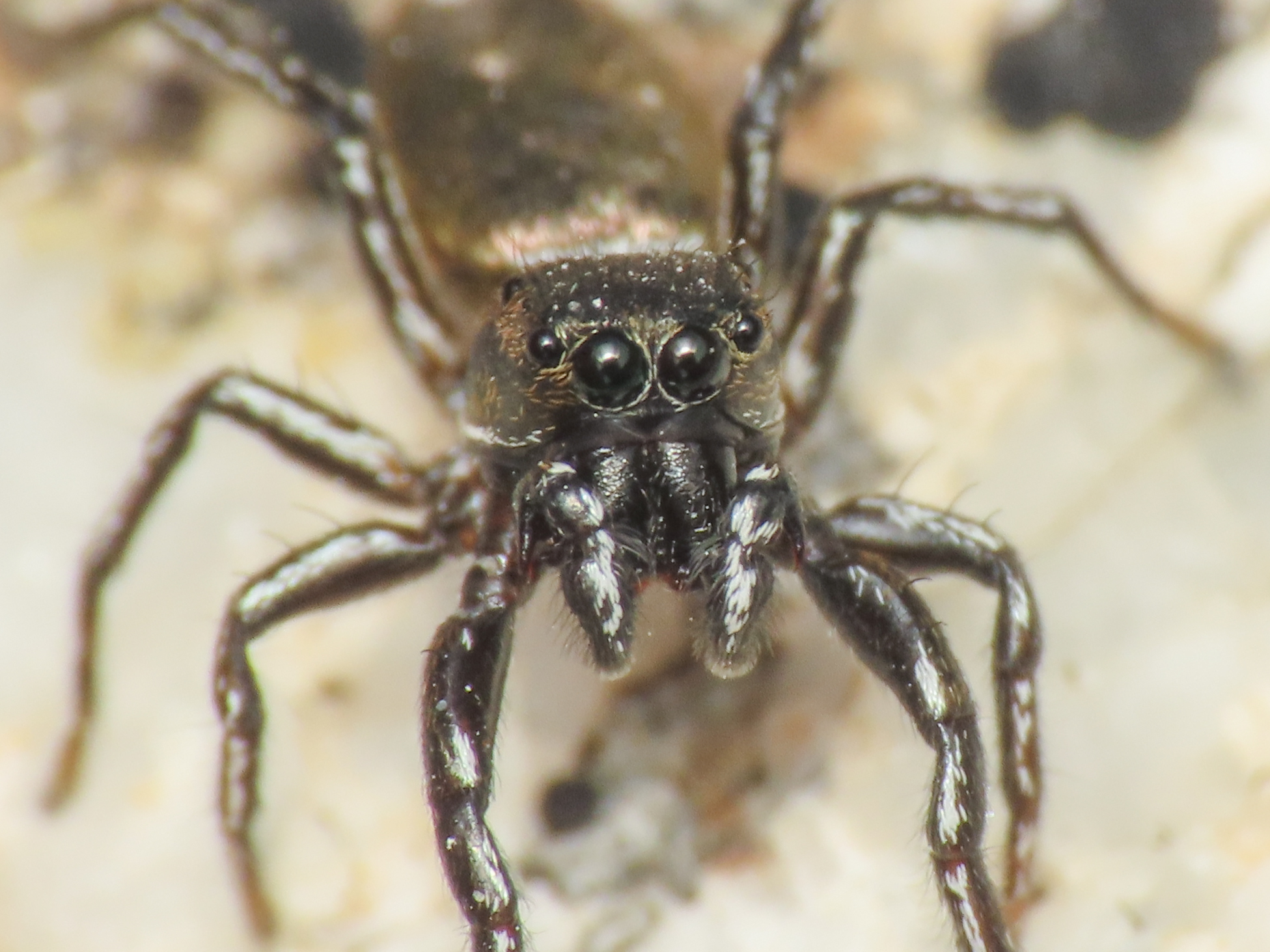
male from front

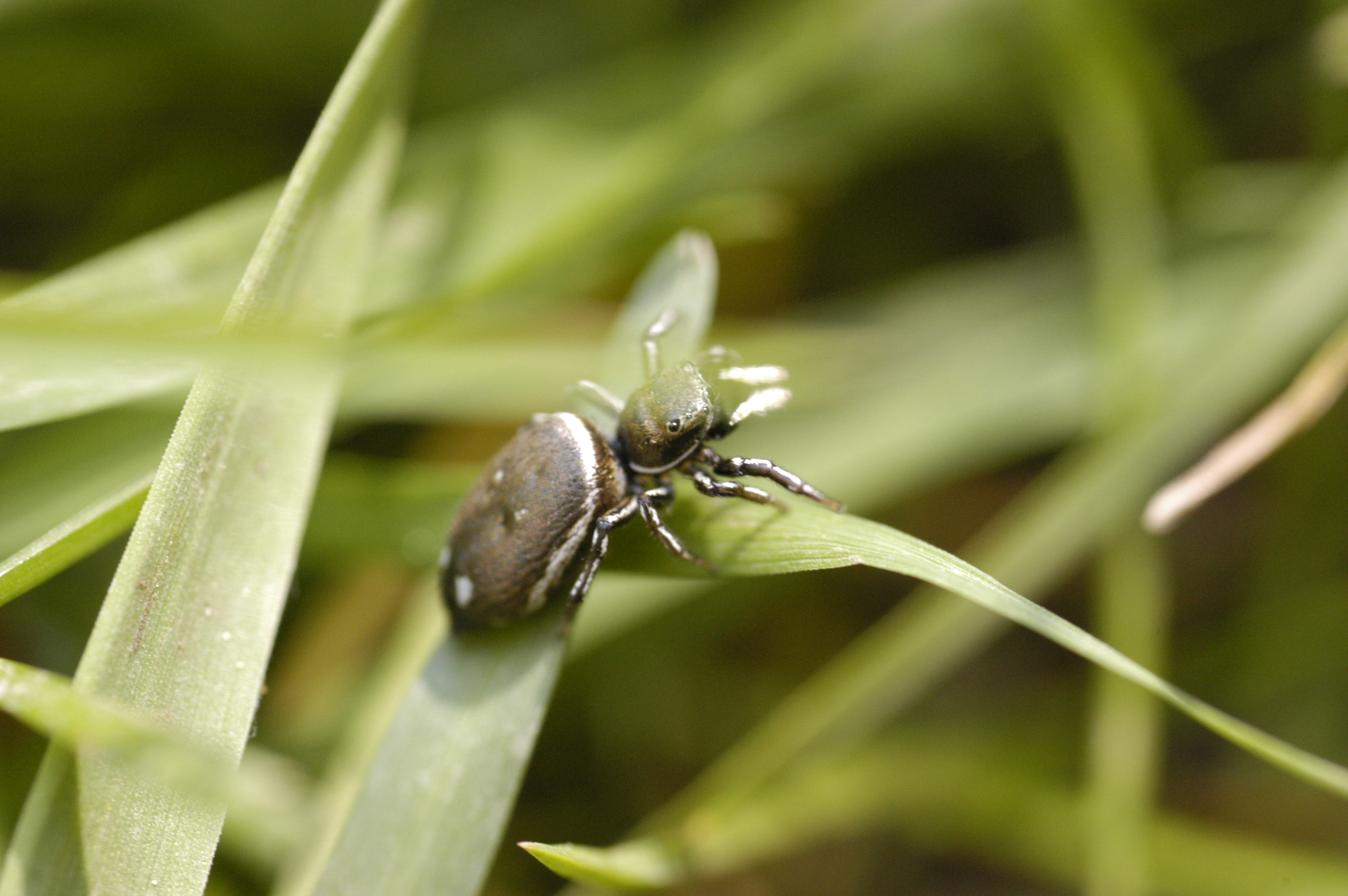
female in grass

=== Females ===
The female H. aeneus reaches a length of approximately 6.3mm ("3 lines"), with an opisthosoma width of about 2.1mm (1¼ lines). The general coloration is black, bronze, or copper-coloured with a somewhat matte sheen. The upper front portion of the opisthosoma has a whitish or light reddish border. The walking legs and pedipalps are dark brown with dark yellow markings, while the terminal segments are yellow.

The chelicerae are dark brown and glossy, with fine hairs. The eight eyes are yellow-brown and shiny, arranged as shown in taxonomic figures. The pedipalps are moderately hairy, light or dark brown in colour, with yellow terminal segments.

The cephalothorax is black with fine, forward-pointing black hairs and is entirely covered with bronze or copper-coloured, subdued glossy scales. The chest region is black.

The opisthosoma is elongated and oval-shaped, black in colour, finely covered with black hairs and densely covered with bronze and copper-coloured, subdued glossy scales. At the front base, the scales are whitish or yellowish, forming a light-coloured border that extends to about half the length of the opisthosoma. The abdomen is black.

The legs are sparsely hairy, light or dark brown in colour with light or dark yellowish markings, but the terminal segments are always yellow.

=== Males ===
Males are smaller than females, reaching only about 2 mm in length when fully grown. They are coloured similarly to females, but the front light-coloured border of the opisthosoma is barely noticeable. The pedipalps are considerably thickened at the terminal segment, and the proportionally longer walking legs are entirely black or dark brown.

== Taxonomy ==
The species was originally described by Carl Wilhelm Hahn in 1832 as Salticus aeneus. It was later transferred to the genus Heliophanus. The species Heliophanus inornatus, described by Eugène Simon in 1868, was later synonymized with H. aeneus by Simon himself in 1937.
