= Heliophanus auratus =

- female (Koch 1848)
- male (Koch 1848)

Scientific classification
- Kingdom: Animalia
- Phylum: Arthropoda
- Subphylum: Chelicerata
- Class: Arachnida
- Order: Araneae
- Infraorder: Araneomorphae
- Family: Salticidae
- Genus: Heliophanus
- Species: H. auratus

Binomial name
- Heliophanus auratus C. L. Koch, 1835

Synonyms
- Heliophanus varians Simon, 1868; Heliophanus branickii Simon, 1868; Heliophanus exultans L. Koch, in Simon, 1868; Heliophanus nigriceps Kulczyński, 1895

Species of jumping spider

Heliophanus auratus is a species of jumping spider in the genus Heliophanus. It has a wide distribution across the Palearctic region.

== Etymology ==
The specific name auratus is derived from Latin meaning "golden" or "gilded", referring to the golden-green coloration described in the original description.

== Distribution ==
H. auratus has been recorded from Europe, Turkey, the Caucasus, Russia (from European Russia to South Siberia), Kazakhstan, Central Asia, and China.

== Habitat ==
The species is found in various habitats including sunny slopes where fully developed males and females can be found together in May on vegetation.

== Description ==
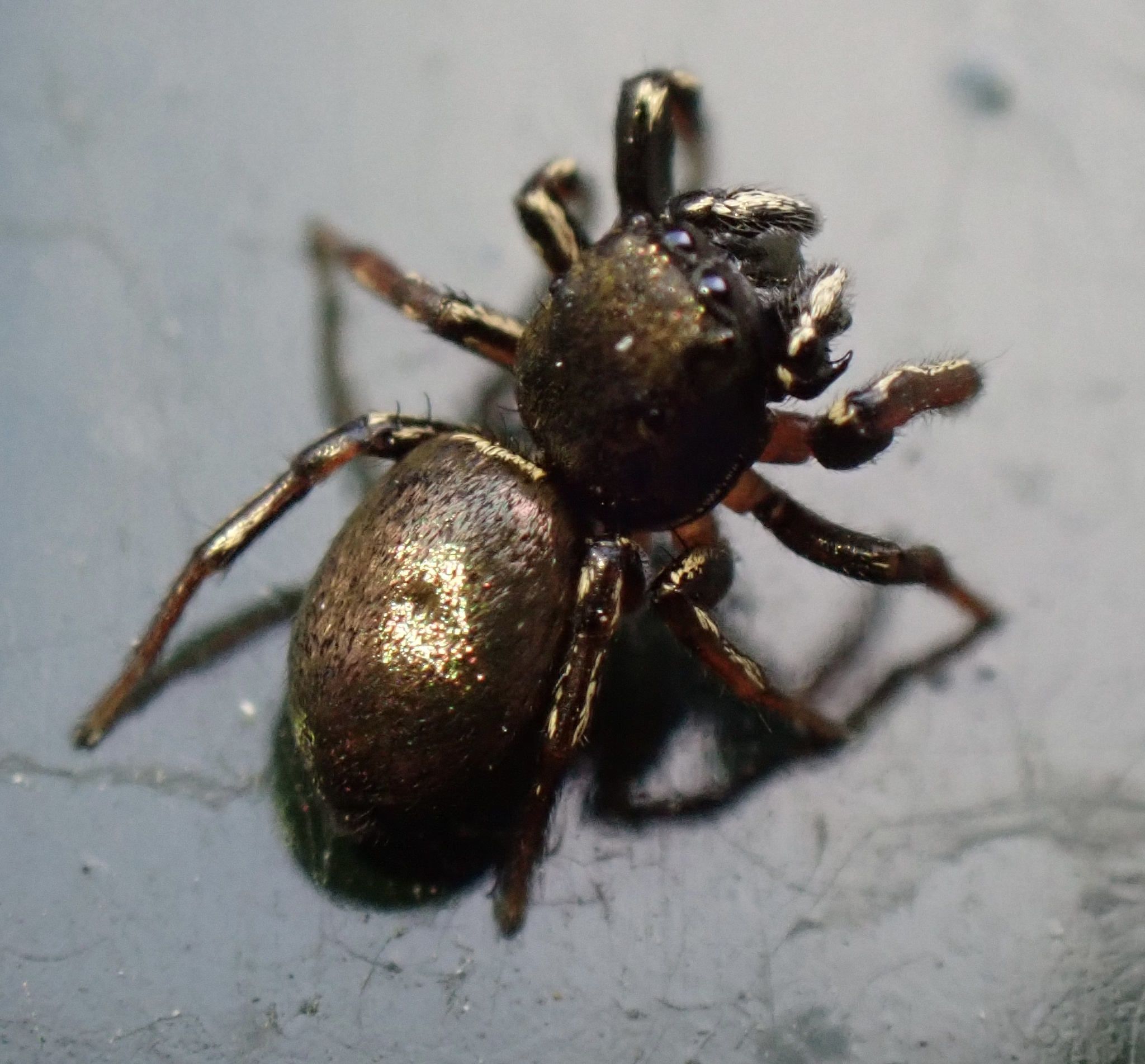
male from Netherlands

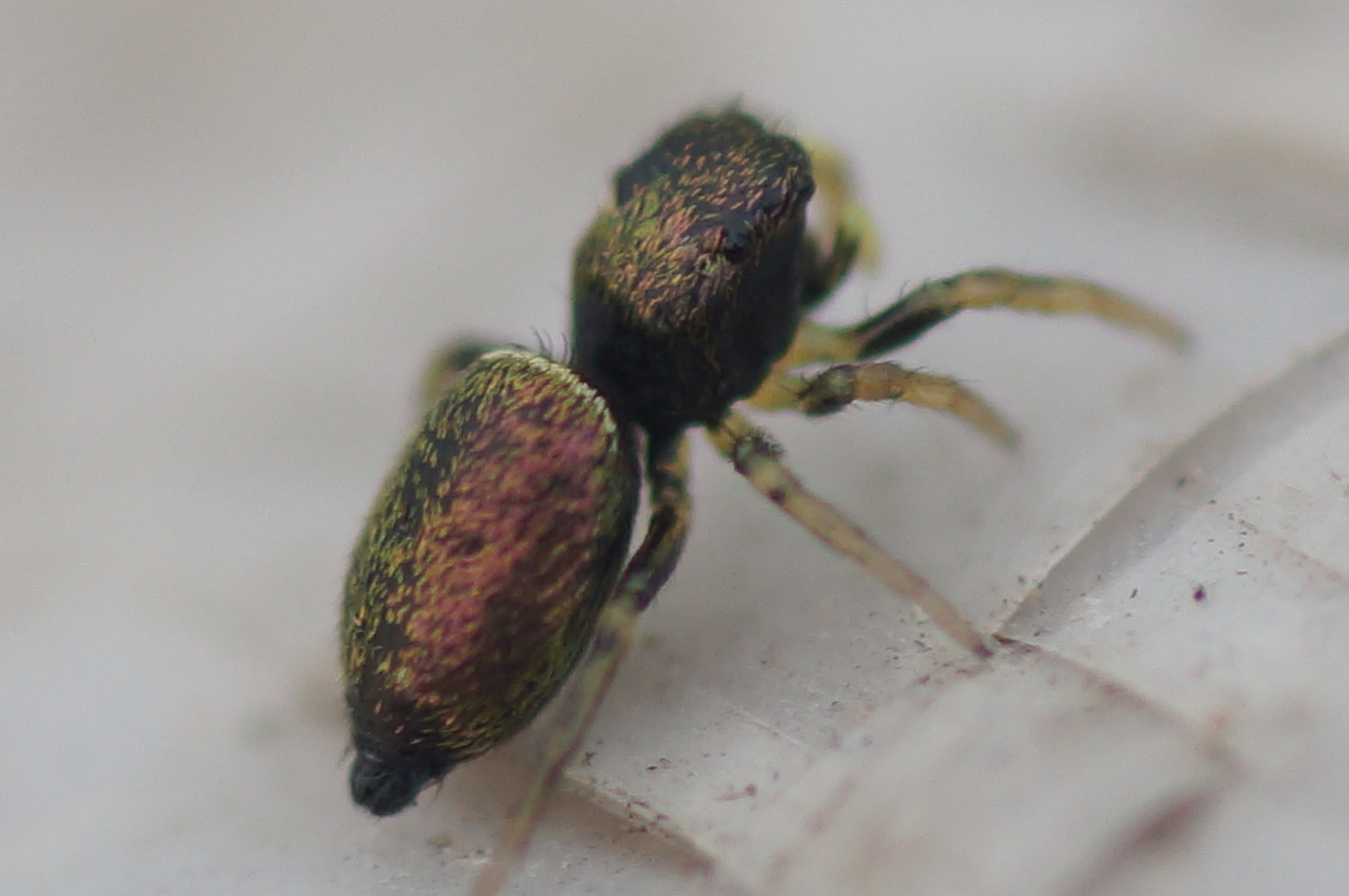
juvenile female from Russia

Heliophanus auratus is a small jumping spider with distinct sexual dimorphism in coloration and size patterns.

=== Females ===
Females are predominantly black with golden-green iridescent scaling on the upper surface. The cephalothorax and opisthosoma are densely covered with golden-green scales that produce an extraordinary metallic lustre. A fine white line runs along the edges of the carapace, and there is a yellowish-white curved stripe extending from the sides to about half the length of the abdomen. Four distinct pits are visible on the upper surface. The spinnerets are black, with the first and second segments of the pedipalps being black and the remainder bright yellow, while the third segment is black underneath. The legs are black with a reddish-yellow longitudinal line, and the tarsal segment is yellow.

=== Males ===
Males are smaller than females and have red-golden lustrous scales on the cephalothorax and opisthosoma. The legs show more black coloration, and the yellow color tends toward reddish-yellow. The femora of the hind legs also tend toward red. The black pedipalps have a white stripe made of fine hairs on the upper surface of the terminal segment and on the penultimate segment. A very rare variant has a fine white streak on both sides above the spinnerets.
