= Heliophanus parvus =

Scientific classification
- Kingdom: Animalia
- Phylum: Arthropoda
- Subphylum: Chelicerata
- Class: Arachnida
- Order: Araneae
- Infraorder: Araneomorphae
- Family: Salticidae
- Genus: Heliophanus
- Species: H. parvus

Binomial name
- Heliophanus parvus Wesołowska & van Harten, 1994

Species of spider

Heliophanus parvus is a species of jumping spider in the genus Heliophanus that lives on the Socotra Archipelago off the coast of Yemen. It was first described in 1994.
