= Heliophanus sororius =

Golden Gate Heliophanus Sunny Jumping Spider

Scientific classification
- Kingdom: Animalia
- Phylum: Arthropoda
- Subphylum: Chelicerata
- Class: Arachnida
- Order: Araneae
- Infraorder: Araneomorphae
- Family: Salticidae
- Genus: Heliophanus
- Species: H. sororius

Binomial name
- Heliophanus sororius Wesołowska, 2003

Species of spider

Heliophanus sororius is a species of jumping spider in the family Salticidae. It is found in Lesotho and South Africa and is commonly known as the Golden Gate Heliophanus sunny jumping spider.

== Distribution ==
Heliophanus sororius is found in Lesotho and South Africa. Within South Africa, it is known from three provinces: Eastern Cape, Free State, and Mpumalanga.

== Habitat and ecology ==
This species is a plant-dweller sampled from the Grassland Biome at altitudes ranging from 1328 to 2398 m.

== Conservation ==
Heliophanus sororius is listed as of Least Concern by the South African National Biodiversity Institute due to its wide geographic range. There are no known threats to the species. It is protected in Golden Gate Highlands National Park.

== Taxonomy ==
The male of Heliophanus sororius was described by Wesołowska in 2003 from Golden Gate Highlands National Park in Free State. The female was described by Wesołowska and Haddad in 2018.
