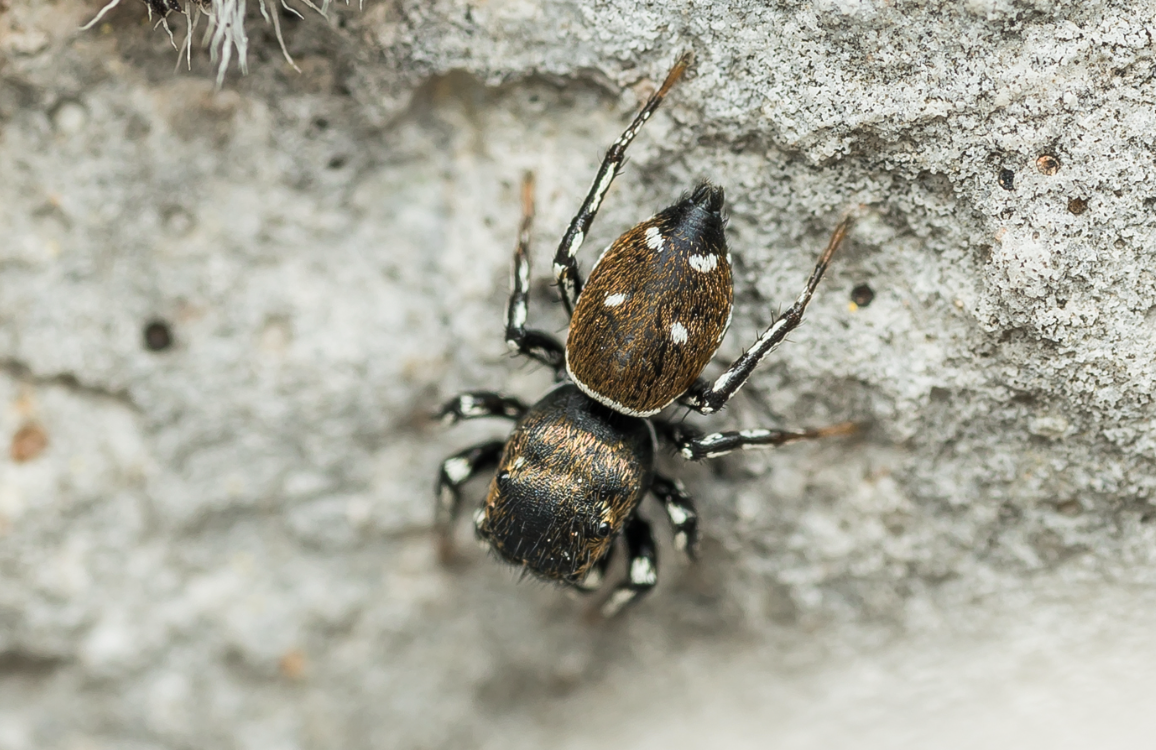

Scientific classification
- Kingdom: Animalia
- Phylum: Arthropoda
- Subphylum: Chelicerata
- Class: Arachnida
- Order: Araneae
- Infraorder: Araneomorphae
- Family: Salticidae
- Genus: Heliophanus
- Species: H. kochii

Binomial name
- Heliophanus kochii Simon, 1868

= Heliophanus kochii =

Species of arachnid

Heliophanus kochii is a jumping spider species in the genus Heliophanus. It was described by Eugène Simon in 1868.
