= Heliophanus dubius =

- female
- male

Scientific classification
- Kingdom: Animalia
- Phylum: Arthropoda
- Subphylum: Chelicerata
- Class: Arachnida
- Order: Araneae
- Infraorder: Araneomorphae
- Family: Salticidae
- Genus: Heliophanus
- Species: H. dubius

Binomial name
- Heliophanus dubius C. L. Koch, 1835

Synonyms
- Heliophanus nitens C. L. Koch, 1846; Heliophanus karpinskii Simon, 1868

Species of jumping spider

Heliophanus dubius is a species of jumping spider in the genus Heliophanus. It has a widespread distribution across Europe, Turkey, the Caucasus, Russia (from the European part to the Far East), Kazakhstan, Uzbekistan, and China.

== Etymology ==
The species name dubius is Latin meaning "doubtful" or "uncertain", likely referring to initial taxonomic uncertainty about the species when it was first described.

== Distribution ==
H. dubius has been recorded from across Europe, extending eastward through Turkey and the Caucasus into Russia, reaching as far as the Russian Far East. The species is also found in Kazakhstan, Uzbekistan, and China. It is common on shrubs in the region around Regensburg, Germany, where it was originally described.

== Description ==
female of H. nitens (now H. dubius)

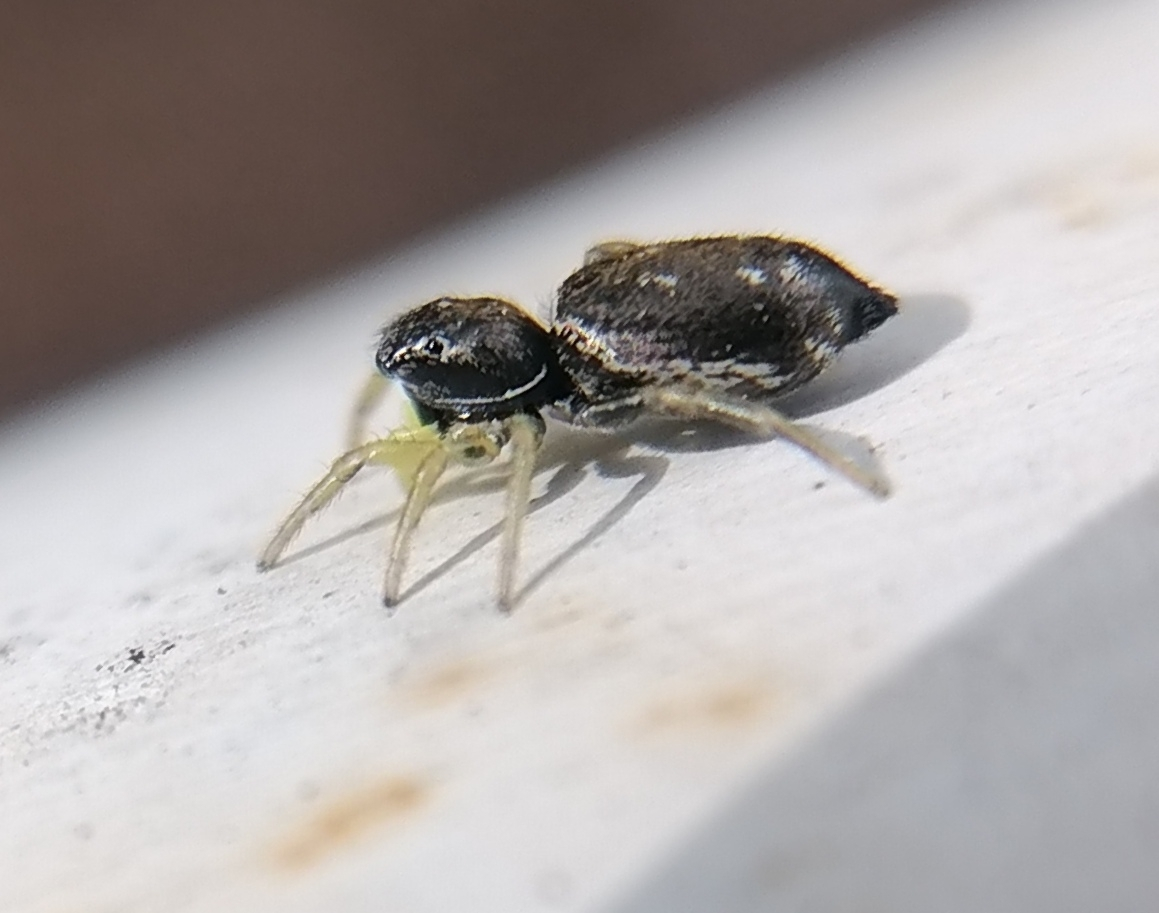
adult female from Russia

Heliophanus dubius exhibits clear sexual dimorphism in its coloration and patterning.

=== Female ===
The female has a black ground color with yellow hairs covering the cephalothorax and a four-spotted pattern on the opisthosoma. The cephalothorax appears black, covered with yellow hairs but lacks metallic sheen, with a white curved line around the front portion. The legs and pedipalps are yellow, with the first legs having a greenish tinge from the "knees" (patellae) downward.

The opisthosoma has a black ground color covered with yellow hairs, though the black color predominates on the front portion and the yellow on the rear. A white curved line extends across the rear portion, continuing along the sides to about half the length. The middle bears paired black depressions connected by shadow-like stripes, with occasionally four white cross-stripes visible. The ventral surface and spinnerets are black, with three white longitudinal stripes on the former. The mouthparts and chelicerae are black, while the pedipalps are beautifully yellow.

=== Male ===
Males are smaller with yellow hairs playing a more prominent role in the coloration. The legs are light yellow to bright yellow, with the "knees" and remaining joints taking on a greenish hue, while the shins (tibiae) of the hind legs are blackish above and at the tip.

The male can also occur with darker colored legs, where the shins are then blackish, those of the hind pair entirely black, and at the "knees" and shins there is usually a black spot. Males have a fine white line noted at the edges of the carapace, with black shins bearing a yellow longitudinal line.

The pedipalps appear black in adult males.

== Behavior ==
Males and females can be found fully mature in May, and their mating behavior has been frequently observed in containers, suggesting they belong together as one species.
