= Heliophanus wesolowskae =

Scientific classification
- Kingdom: Animalia
- Phylum: Arthropoda
- Subphylum: Chelicerata
- Class: Arachnida
- Order: Araneae
- Infraorder: Araneomorphae
- Family: Salticidae
- Genus: Heliophanus
- Species: H. wesolowskae

Binomial name
- Heliophanus wesolowskae Rakov & Logunov, 1997

Species of spider

Heliophanus wesolowskae is a jumping spider species in the genus Heliophanus. It was first identified in 1997.

== Etymology ==
The species name of Heliophanus wesolowskae is named after the Polish arachnologist Wanda Wesołowska.

== Distribution ==
The spider is found in Central Asia and particularly in Kazakhstan and Kyrgyzstan.
