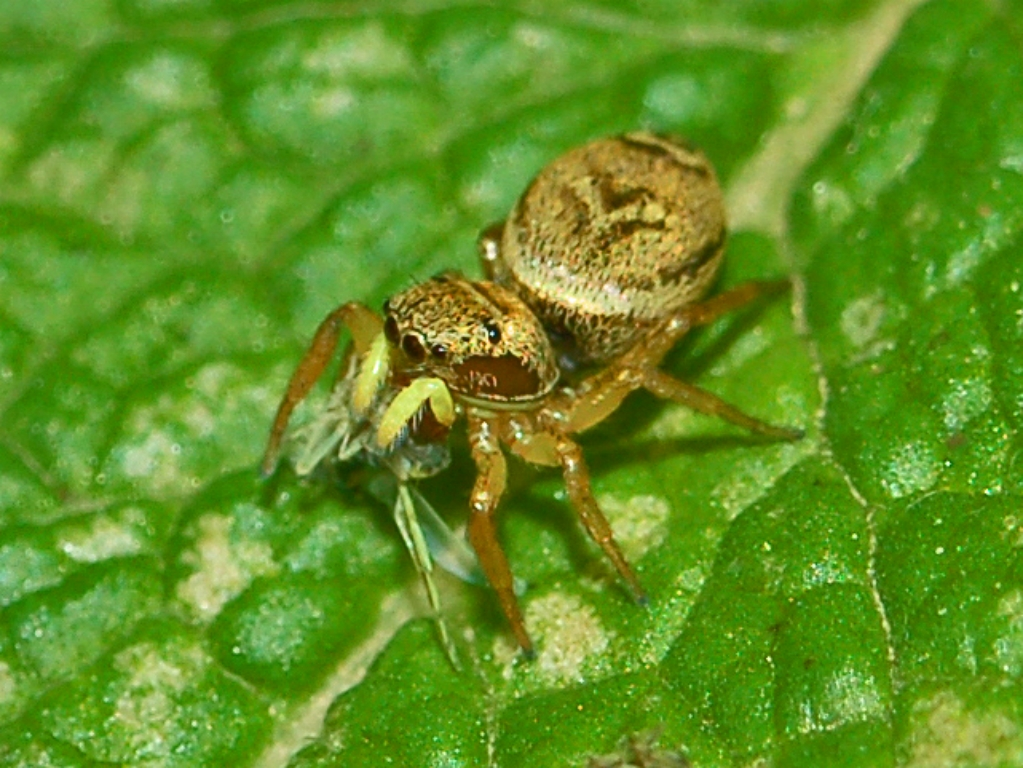
- Heliophanus cf. tribulosus, female

Scientific classification
- Kingdom: Animalia
- Phylum: Arthropoda
- Subphylum: Chelicerata
- Class: Arachnida
- Order: Araneae
- Infraorder: Araneomorphae
- Family: Salticidae
- Genus: Heliophanus
- Species: H. tribulosus

Binomial name
- Heliophanus tribulosus Simon, 1868

= Heliophanus tribulosus =

Species of spider

Heliophanus tribulosus is a species of 'jumping spiders' belonging to the family Salticidae.

== Description ==
Heliophanus tribulosus can reach approximately a body length of 3–5 millimetres (0.12–0.20 in) in males, of 3.5–7 millimetres (0.14–0.28 in) in females. This species shows characteristic reddish-brown cheeks. These spiders have eight eyes with very large anterior median eyes and smaller on each side. Their eyesight is excellent and very useful in their way of hunting.

The coloration and the markings of adult males and females are characterized by a significant Sexual dimorphism. The young males are quite similar to the females but following their last moult, they show a completely different look. The typical adult males are small and mainly black, with red or green reflections on the abdomen. Also the legs are black, usually with a thin white stripe on the edge. The cephalothorax is glabrous, sometimes with two white spots behind the eyes. Head and the underside of the abdomen are surrounded by two large whitish circles. On the back of the abdomen there are also two white spots.

The basic coloration of the females is pale greenish-brown. The posterior lateral eyes are jointed by a clear stripe. On the tip of the abdomen there are two bright spots, two comma-shaped drawings are on the middle back and two points behind the abdomen, sometimes merging in a large white circle surrounds the edge. The legs are completely yellow, while the pedipalps are definitely apple green, slightly darkening on the tips.

== Distribution and habitat ==
This species is present in most of Europe east to Kazakhstan. They can mainly be encountered on low vegetation, in meadows and forest edges and on sunny rocks or walls of houses, where they actively pursue their prey.
