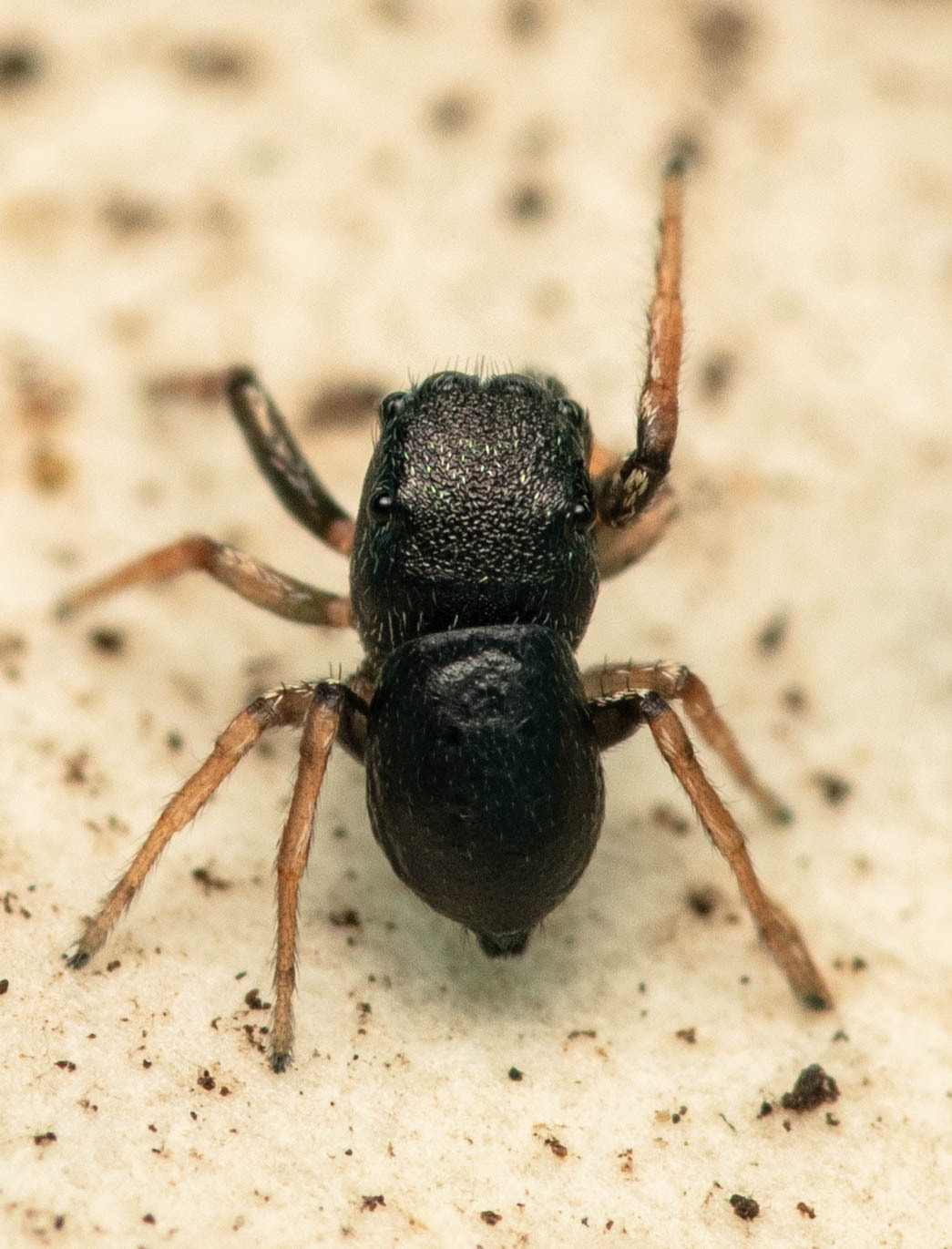
- male
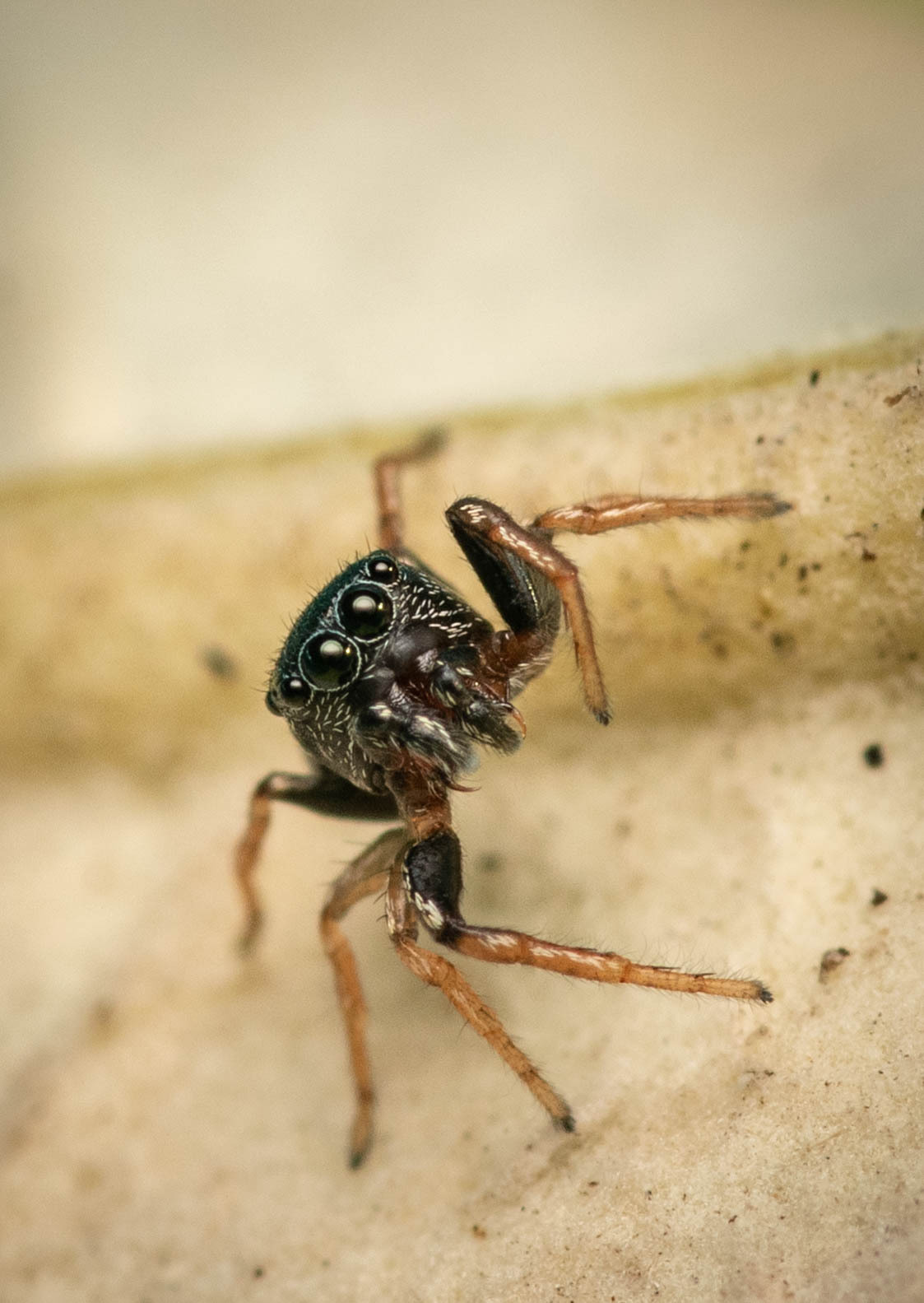
- male

Scientific classification
- Kingdom: Animalia
- Phylum: Arthropoda
- Subphylum: Chelicerata
- Class: Arachnida
- Order: Araneae
- Infraorder: Araneomorphae
- Family: Salticidae
- Genus: Heliophanus
- Species: H. pygmaeus

Binomial name
- Heliophanus pygmaeus Wesołowska & Russell-Smith, 2000

Synonyms
- Xuriella prima Wesołowska & Russell-Smith, 2000

= Heliophanus pygmaeus =

Pygmy Heliophanus Sunny Jumping Spider

Species of spider

Heliophanus pygmaeus is a species of jumping spider in the family Salticidae. It is found in several African countries and is commonly known as the pygmy Heliophanus sunny jumping spider.

== Distribution ==
Heliophanus pygmaeus is found in Mozambique, Senegal, South Africa, Tanzania and Zimbabwe.

Within South Africa, it has been found in KwaZulu-Natal, Limpopo, and Mpumalanga.

== Habitat and ecology ==
This quick-moving, tiny, beetle-like spider has been sampled from vegetation and grass tussocks in the Savanna Biome at altitudes ranging from 91 to 904 m.

== Description ==
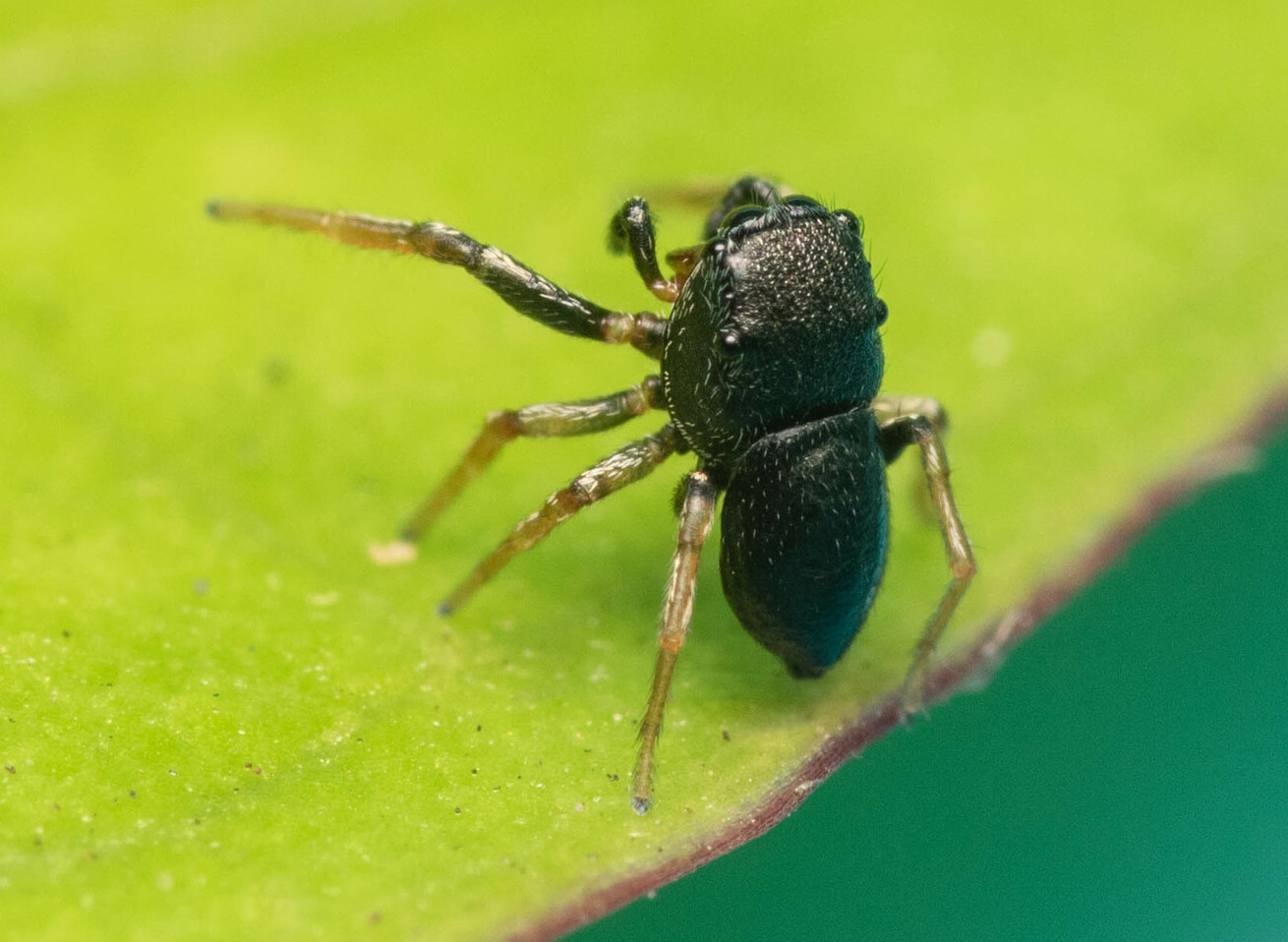
male

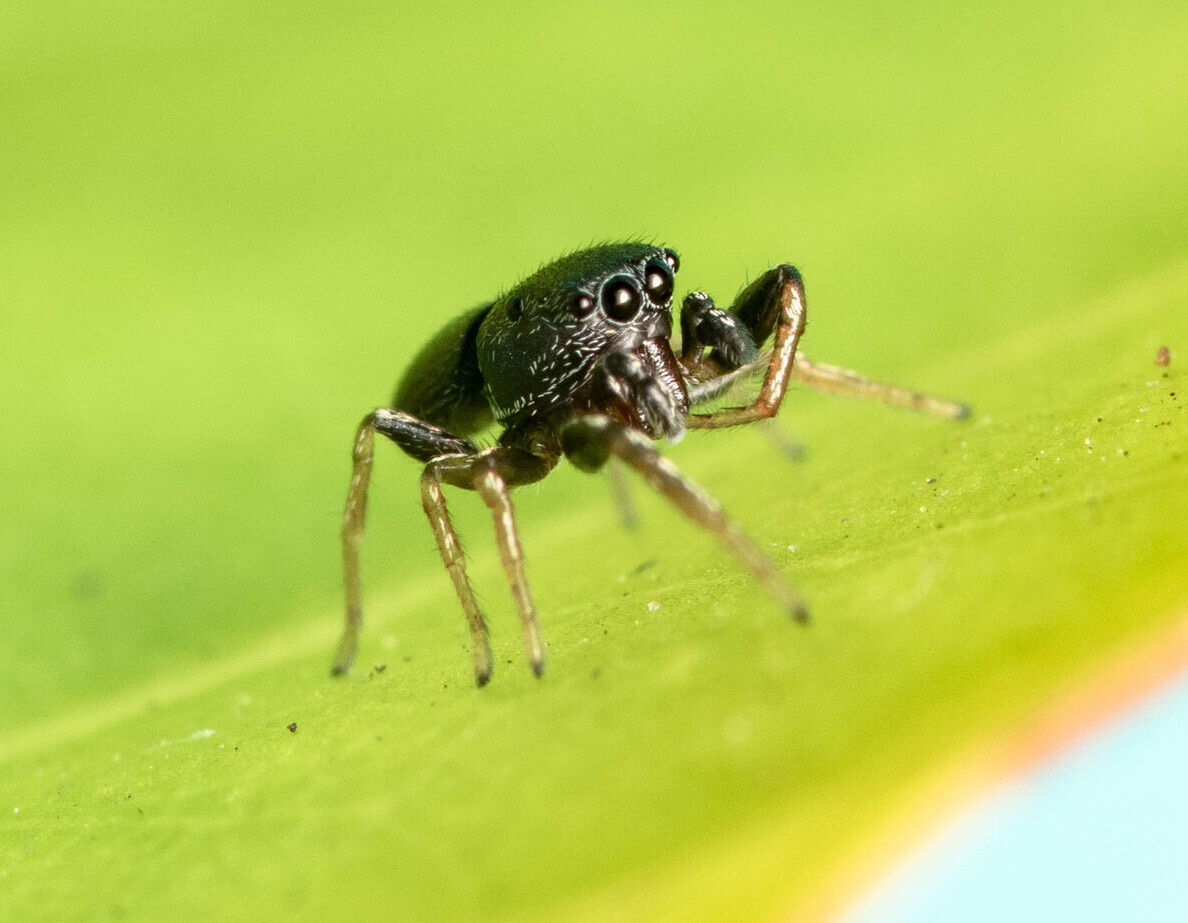
male

Both sexes of this species are known. The species is small and beetle-like in appearance.

== Conservation ==
Heliophanus pygmaeus is listed as of Least Concern by the South African National Biodiversity Institute due to its wide geographical range. There are no known threats to the species. In South Africa, it is protected in four protected areas: Atherstone Nature Reserve, Kruger National Park, Ndumo Game Reserve and Tembe Elephant Park.

== Taxonomy ==
Heliophanus pygmaeus was described by Wesołowska and Russell-Smith in 2000 from a male from Tanzania. Additional notes were added by Wesołowska in 2004 and by Wesołowska and Cumming in 2008.
