= Heliophanus pratti =

Pratt's Heliophanus Sunny Jumping Spider

Scientific classification
- Kingdom: Animalia
- Phylum: Arthropoda
- Subphylum: Chelicerata
- Class: Arachnida
- Order: Araneae
- Infraorder: Araneomorphae
- Family: Salticidae
- Genus: Heliophanus
- Species: H. pratti

Binomial name
- Heliophanus pratti Peckham & Peckham, 1903

Species of spider

Heliophanus pratti is a species of jumping spider in the family Salticidae. It is found in Namibia and South Africa and is commonly known as Pratt's Heliophanus sunny jumping spider.

== Distribution ==
Heliophanus pratti is found in Namibia and South Africa. Within South Africa, it is known from Eastern Cape, Mpumalanga, and Western Cape.

== Habitat and ecology ==
This species is a plant-dweller sampled from the Fynbos, Succulent Karoo and Nama Karoo biomes at altitudes ranging from 3 to 1415 m.

== Conservation ==
Heliophanus pratti is listed as of Least Concern by the South African National Biodiversity Institute due to its wide geographical range. There are no known threats to the species.In South Africa, it is protected in five protected areas.

== Taxonomy ==
The male of Heliophanus pratti was described by George and Elizabeth Peckham in 1903 from Willowmore. Wesołowska added additional data and drawings in 1986.
