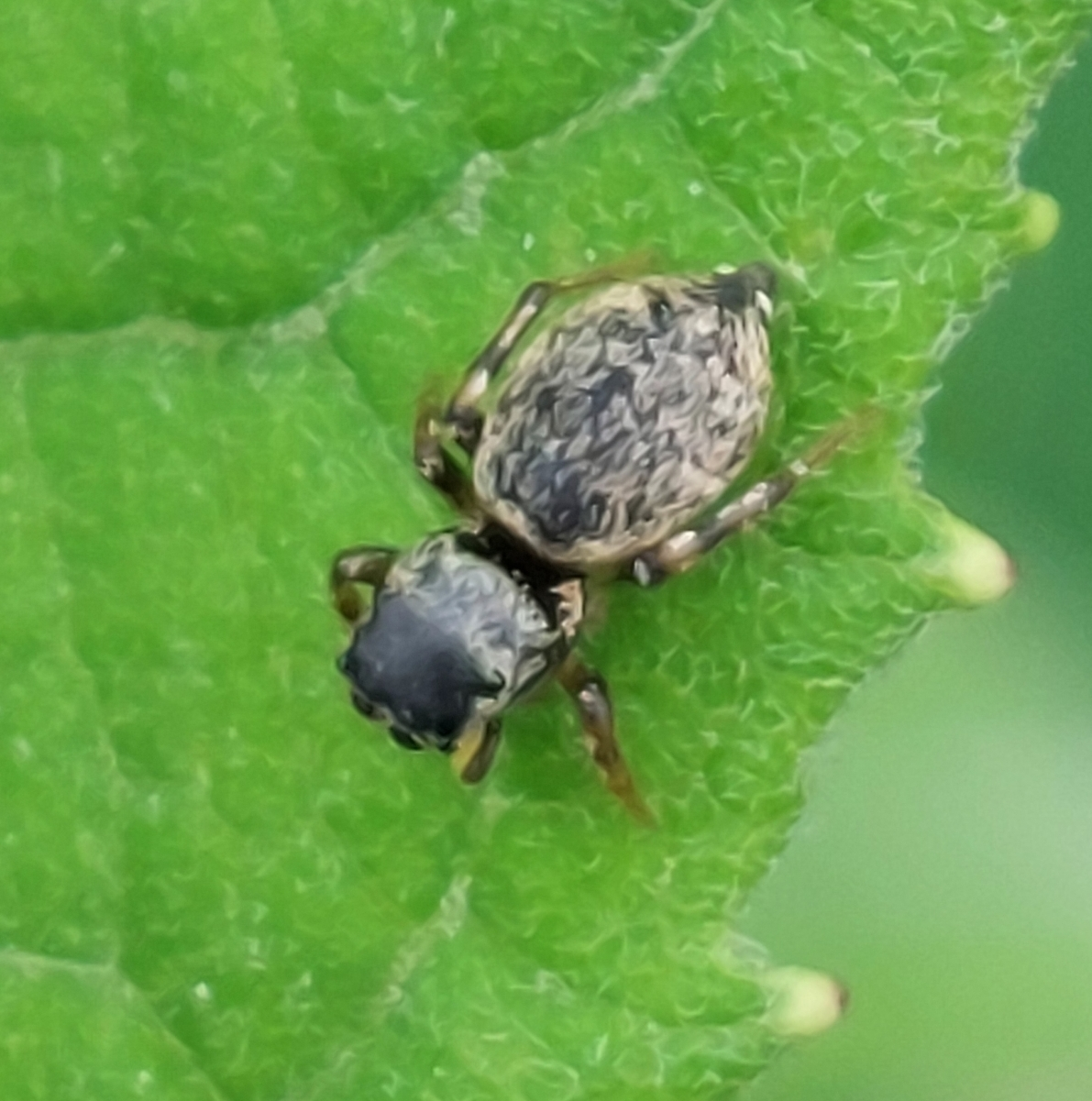

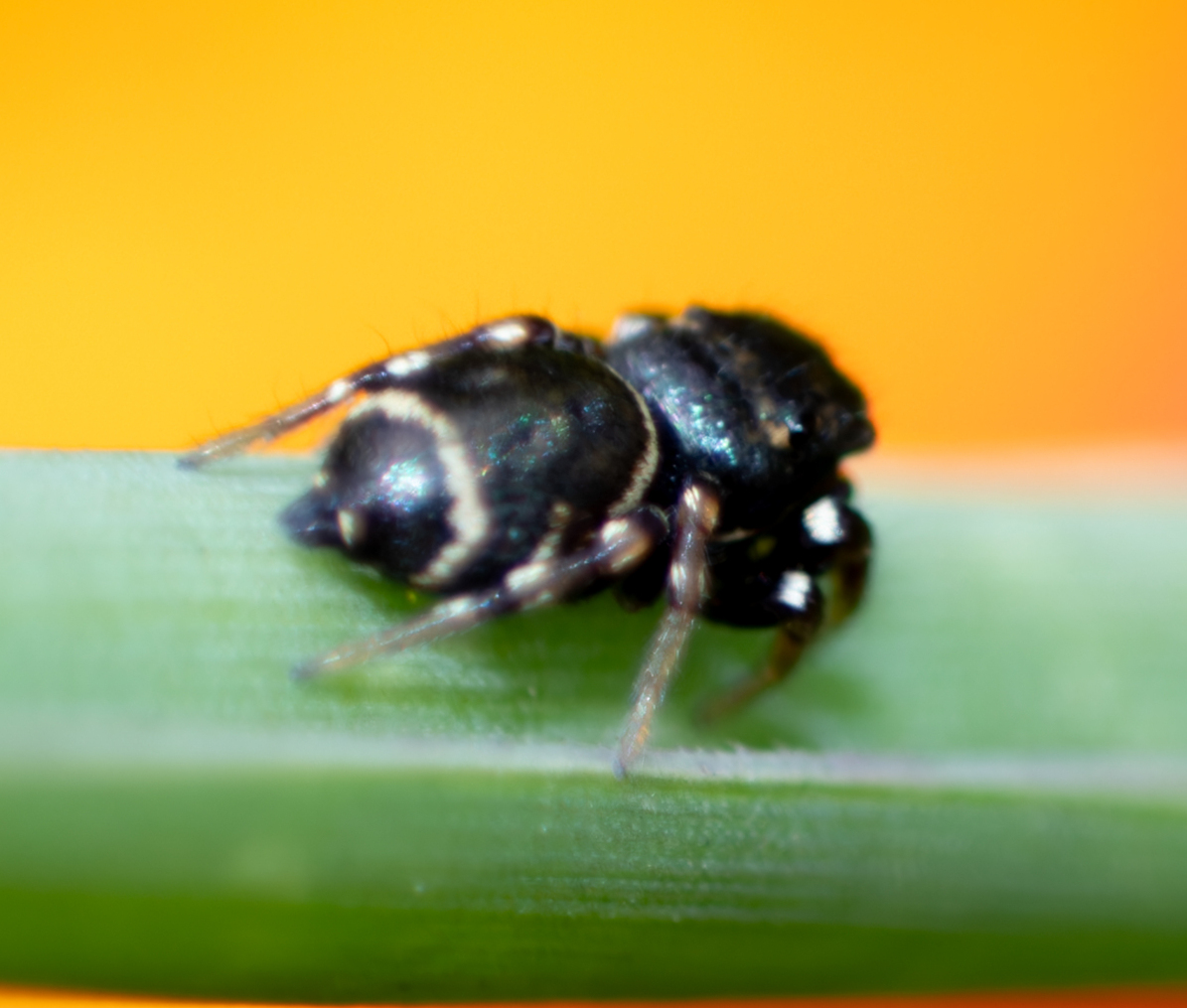

Scientific classification
- Kingdom: Animalia
- Phylum: Arthropoda
- Subphylum: Chelicerata
- Class: Arachnida
- Order: Araneae
- Infraorder: Araneomorphae
- Family: Salticidae
- Genus: Heliophanus
- Species: H. hamifer

Binomial name
- Heliophanus hamifer Simon, 1886

= Heliophanus hamifer =

Mozambican Heliophanus Sunny Jumping Spider

Species of spider

Heliophanus hamifer is a species of jumping spider in the family Salticidae. It is found in several African countries as well as the Comoros, Mayotte, Seychelles, and Madagascar, and has been introduced to Brazil. It is commonly known as the Mozambican Heliophanus sunny jumping spider.

== Distribution ==
Heliophanus hamifer is found in Zimbabwe, Mozambique, South Africa, Comoros, Mayotte, Seychelles, and Madagascar. It has been introduced to Brazil. Within South Africa, it is only known from Limpopo Province, specifically from Lekgalameetse Nature Reserve.

== Habitat and ecology ==
Specimens were collected by beating vegetation, litter sifting and hand collecting in the Savanna Biome at an altitude of 857 m.

== Description ==
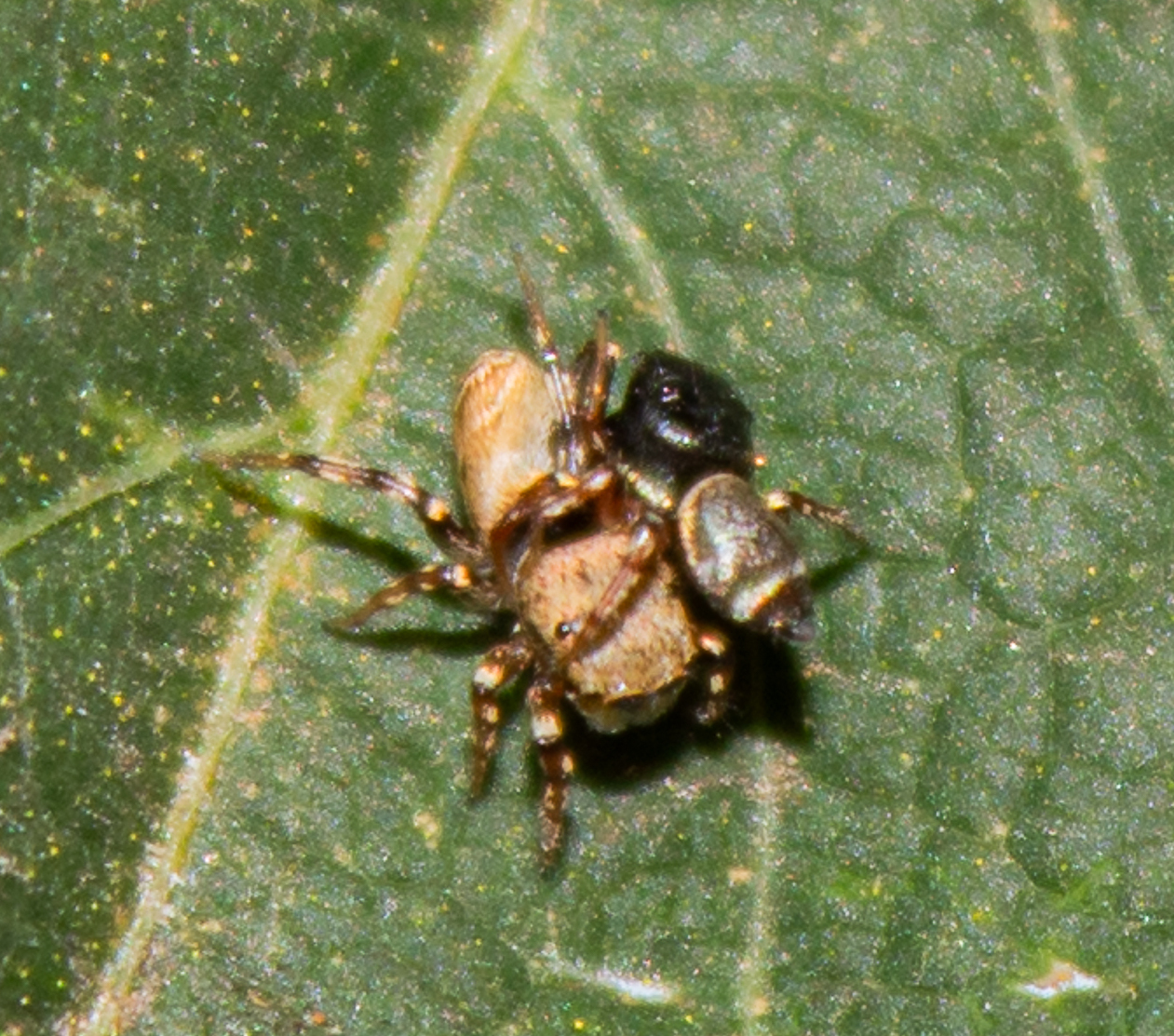
mating

== Conservation ==
Heliophanus hamifer is listed as of Least Concern by the South African National Biodiversity Institute due to its wide geographical range. There are no known threats to the species. In South Africa, it is protected in Lekgalameetse Nature Reserve.

== Taxonomy ==
The male of Heliophanus hamifer was described by Simon in 1886 from Mozambique. The species was revised and the female was described by Wesołowska in 1986.
