= Heliophanus falcatus =

Scientific classification
- Kingdom: Animalia
- Phylum: Arthropoda
- Subphylum: Chelicerata
- Class: Arachnida
- Order: Araneae
- Infraorder: Araneomorphae
- Family: Salticidae
- Genus: Heliophanus
- Species: H. falcatus

Binomial name
- Heliophanus falcatus Wesołowska, 1986

Species of spider

Heliophanus falcatus is a jumping spider species in the genus Heliophanus. It was first described by Wanda Wesołowska in 1986 and is found in Angola and the Democratic Republic of the Congo. The female of the species was thought to be a separate species Natta immemorata until 2003.
