= Heliophanus horrifer =

Cape Town Heliophanus Sunny Jumping Spider

Scientific classification
- Kingdom: Animalia
- Phylum: Arthropoda
- Subphylum: Chelicerata
- Class: Arachnida
- Order: Araneae
- Infraorder: Araneomorphae
- Family: Salticidae
- Genus: Heliophanus
- Species: H. horrifer

Binomial name
- Heliophanus horrifer Wesołowska, 1986

Species of spider

Heliophanus horrifer is a species of jumping spider in the family Salticidae. It is endemic to South Africa and is commonly known as the Cape Town Heliophanus sunny jumping spider.

== Distribution ==
Heliophanus horrifer is found only in South Africa. Within the country, it is known only from Western Cape Province, specifically from Cape Town and Stellenbosch.

== Habitat and ecology ==
The species has been sampled from vegetation in the Fynbos Biome at altitudes ranging from 7 to 103 m.

== Conservation ==
Heliophanus horrifer is listed as Data Deficient by the South African National Biodiversity Institute for taxonomic reasons. The species is presently known only from Cape Town and Stellenbosch. Additional sampling is needed to collect the male and determine the species' range.

== Taxonomy ==
Heliophanus horrifer was described by Wesołowska in 1986 from Cape Town.
