= Heliophanus deformis =

Rusty Heliophanus Sunny Jumping Spider

Scientific classification
- Kingdom: Animalia
- Phylum: Arthropoda
- Subphylum: Chelicerata
- Class: Arachnida
- Order: Araneae
- Infraorder: Araneomorphae
- Family: Salticidae
- Genus: Heliophanus
- Species: H. deformis

Binomial name
- Heliophanus deformis Wesołowska, 1986

Species of spider

Heliophanus deformis is a species of jumping spider in the family Salticidae. It is found in Angola and South Africa and is commonly known as the rusty Heliophanus sunny jumping spider.

== Distribution ==
Heliophanus deformis is found in Angola and South Africa. Within South Africa, the species is only known from Northern Cape Province, specifically from Namaqua National Park and Richtersveld National Park.

== Habitat and ecology ==
This species is a free-living plant-dweller sampled by beating karooid bushes and trees.

== Description ==
The female has a reddish fawn background with typical spots on the abdomen.

== Conservation ==
Heliophanus deformis is listed as of Least Concern by the South African National Biodiversity Institute due to its large distribution range. There are no known threats to the species. In South Africa, it is protected in Namaqua National Park and Richtersveld National Park.

== Taxonomy ==
Heliophanus deformis was originally described by Wesołowska in 1986 from Angola. It was reported from South Africa for the first time by Haddad and Wesołowska in 2024. The species is known from both sexes.
