= Heliophanus designatus =

Willowmore Heliophanus Sunny Jumping Spider

Scientific classification
- Kingdom: Animalia
- Phylum: Arthropoda
- Subphylum: Chelicerata
- Class: Arachnida
- Order: Araneae
- Infraorder: Araneomorphae
- Family: Salticidae
- Genus: Heliophanus
- Species: H. designatus

Binomial name
- Heliophanus designatus (Peckham & Peckham, 1903)

Synonyms
- Sittacus designatus Peckham & Peckham, 1903

Species of spider

Heliophanus designatus is a species of jumping spider in the family Salticidae. It is endemic to South Africa and is commonly known as the Willowmore Heliophanus sunny jumping spider.

== Distribution ==
Heliophanus designatus is found only in South Africa, where it is known only from Willowmore in Eastern Cape Province.

== Habitat and ecology ==
This species is a free-living spider found on ground or plants. It has been recorded at altitudes ranging from 144 to 1719 m.

== Conservation ==
Heliophanus designatus is listed as Data Deficient by the South African National Biodiversity Institute. The species is undersampled and presently known only from the type locality. Additional sampling is needed to collect the male and determine the species' range.

== Taxonomy ==
Heliophanus designatus was originally described in 1903 as Sittacus designatus from Willowmore by George and Elizabeth Peckham. The species is known only from the female. It was transferred to Heliophanus by Maddison and colleagues in 2020.
