= Heliophanus minor =

Scientific classification
- Kingdom: Animalia
- Phylum: Arthropoda
- Subphylum: Chelicerata
- Class: Arachnida
- Order: Araneae
- Infraorder: Araneomorphae
- Family: Salticidae
- Genus: Heliophanus
- Species: H. minor

Binomial name
- Heliophanus minor Dawidowicz & Wesołowska, 2016

Species of spider

Heliophanus minor is a species of jumping spiders in the genus Heliophanus that lives in Kenya. It was first identified in 2016.
