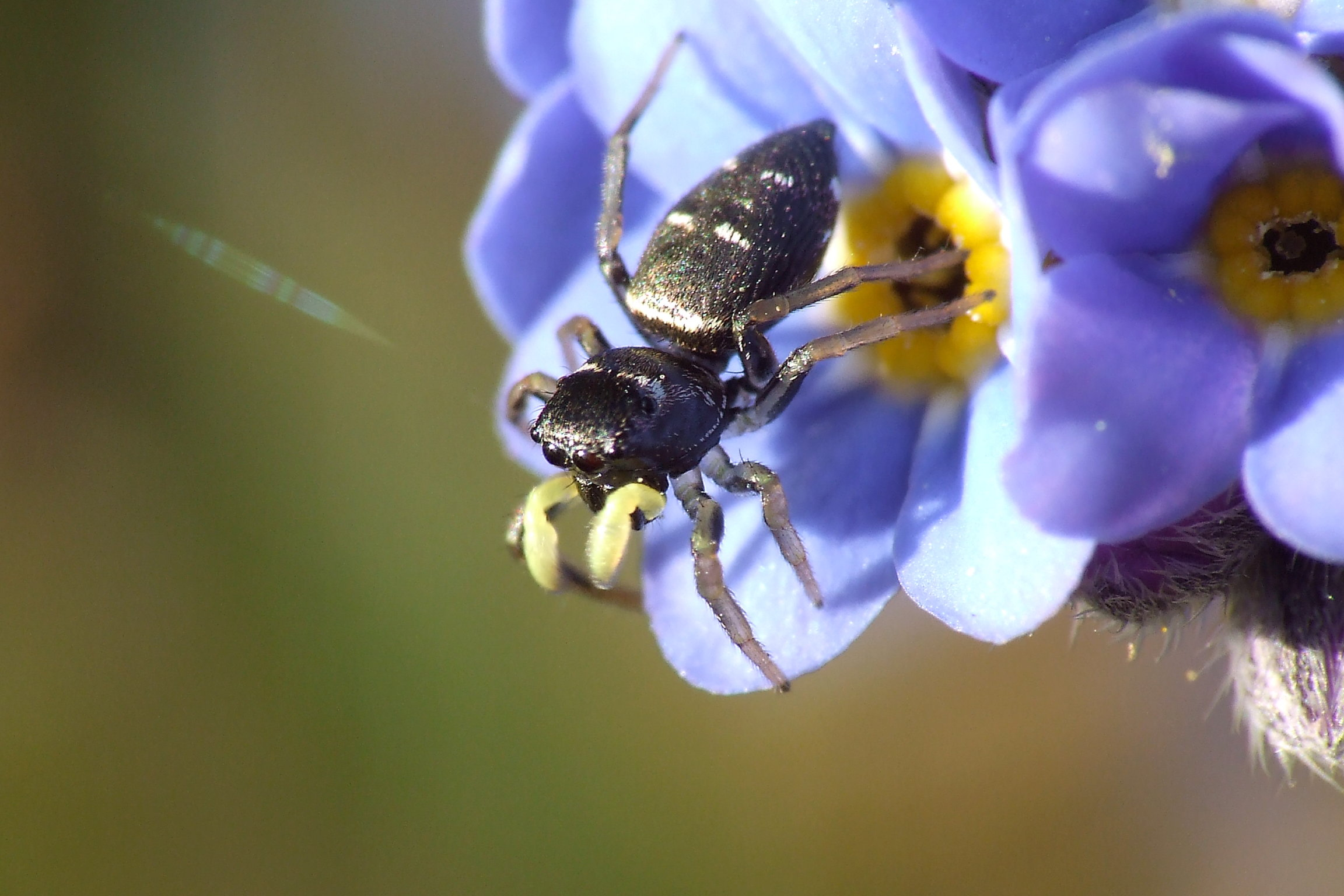
- Heliophanus cupreus, female

Scientific classification
- Kingdom: Animalia
- Phylum: Arthropoda
- Subphylum: Chelicerata
- Class: Arachnida
- Order: Araneae
- Infraorder: Araneomorphae
- Family: Salticidae
- Subfamily: Salticinae
- Genus: Heliophanus; C. L. Koch, 1833

Type species
- Aranea cuprea Walckenaer, 1802

Species
- See text.

Synonyms
- Trapezocephalus Berland & Millot, 1941

= Heliophanus =

Heliophanus Temporal range: Palaeogene–present

Genus of spiders

Heliophanus is a genus of the spider family Salticidae (jumping spiders). Most of the about ninety described species occur in Europe, while reaching into Asia and Africa.

Many former African species in this genus were transferred to other genera such as Helafricanus, Heliocapensis and Trapezocephalus by Wanda Wesolowska in 2024.

== Distribution ==
Heliophanus is an Old World genus. Its range extends throughout Europe, North and southern Africa, and much of Asia. Several species are also endemic to various islands, including the Canary Islands, Madagascar.

Two species have been introduced to the United States, and one to Brazil.

== Species ==
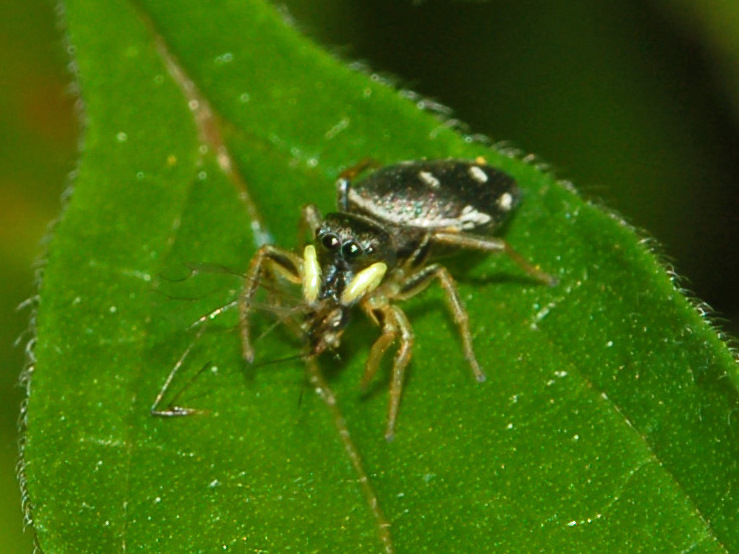
Heliophanus sp.

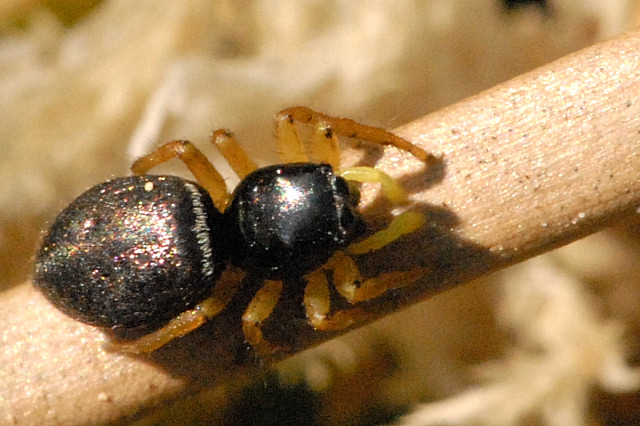
Heliophanus flavipes, female

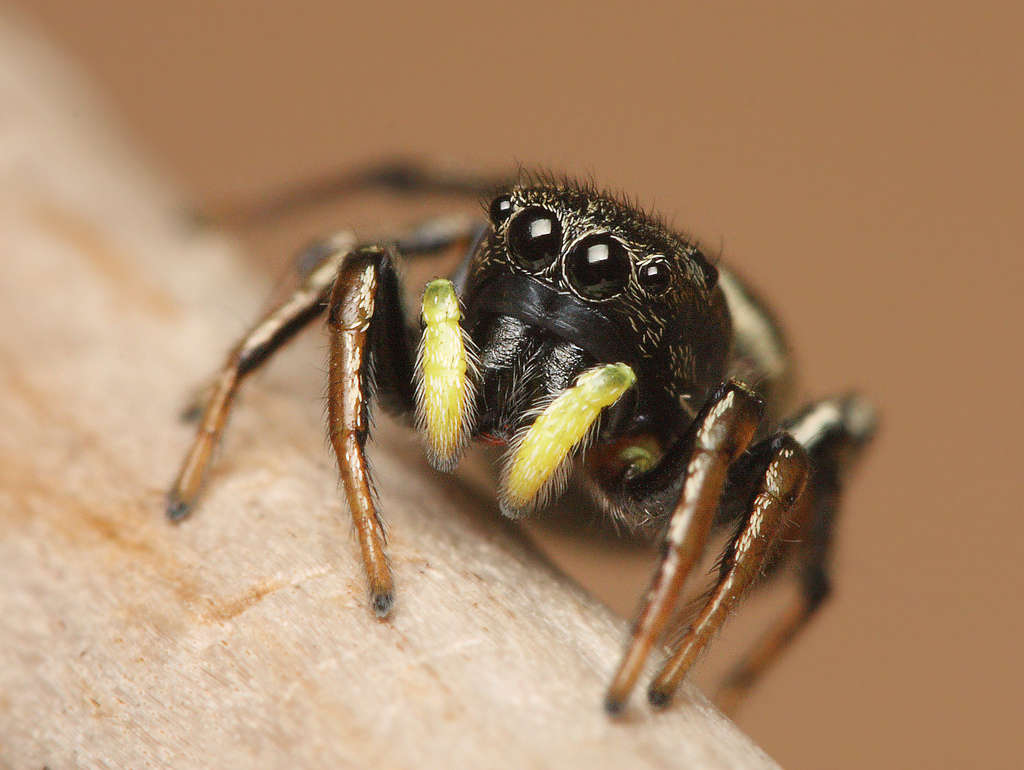
Heliophanus sp.

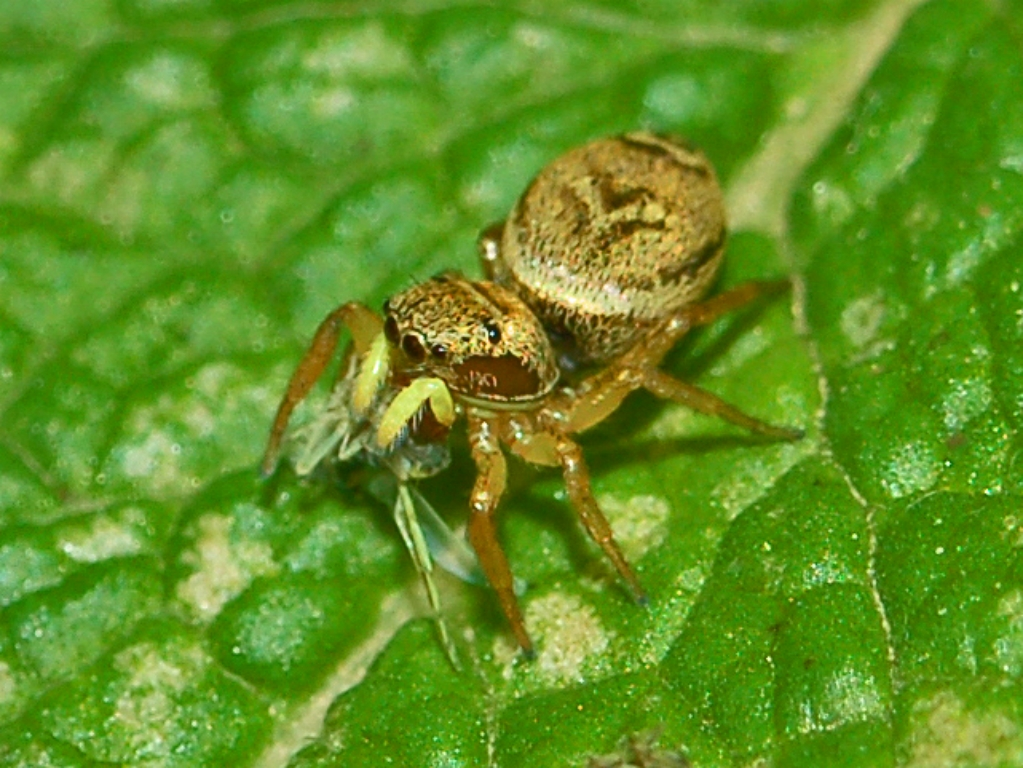
Heliophanus tribulosus, female

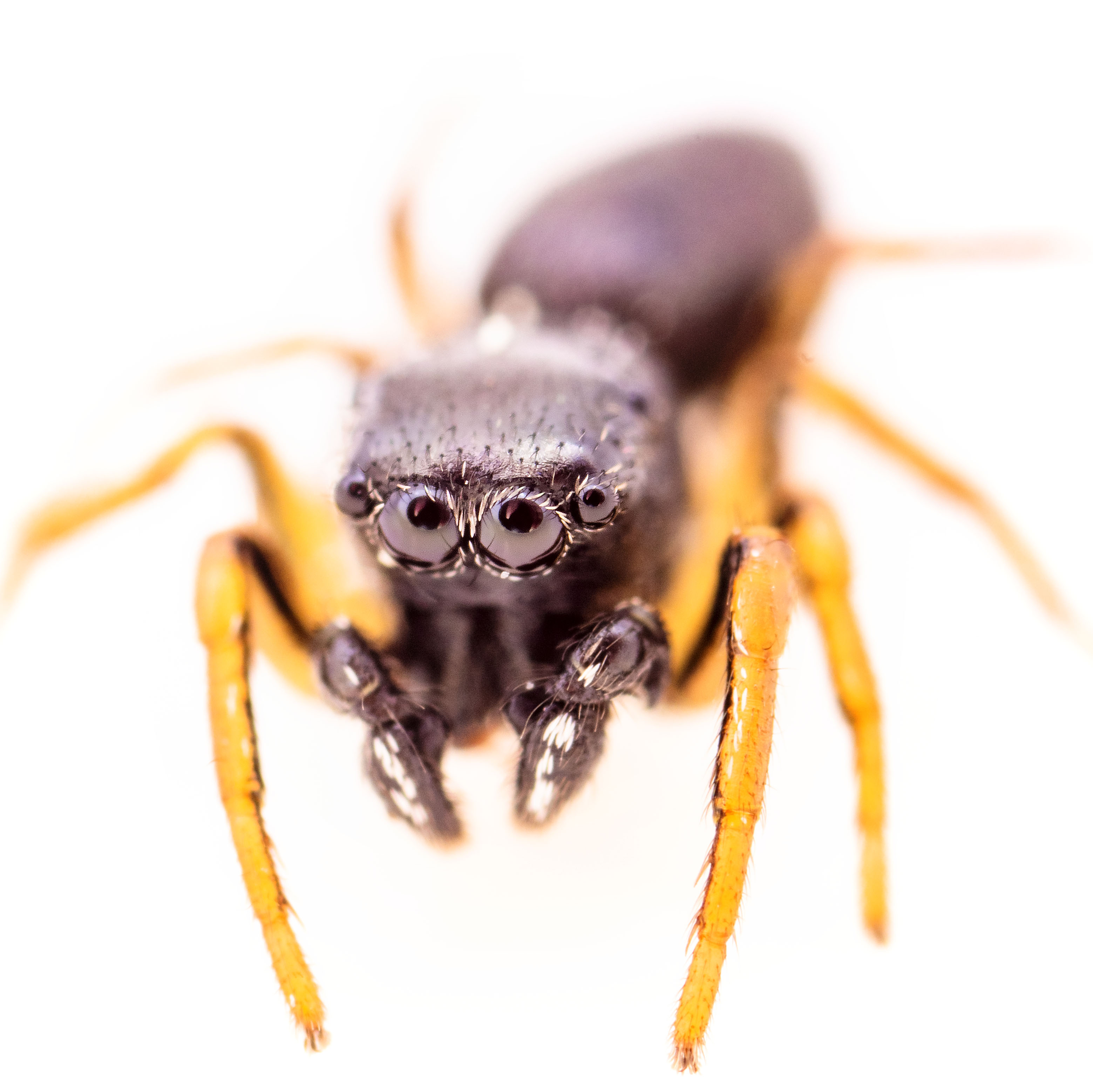
Heliophanus camtschadalicus, male

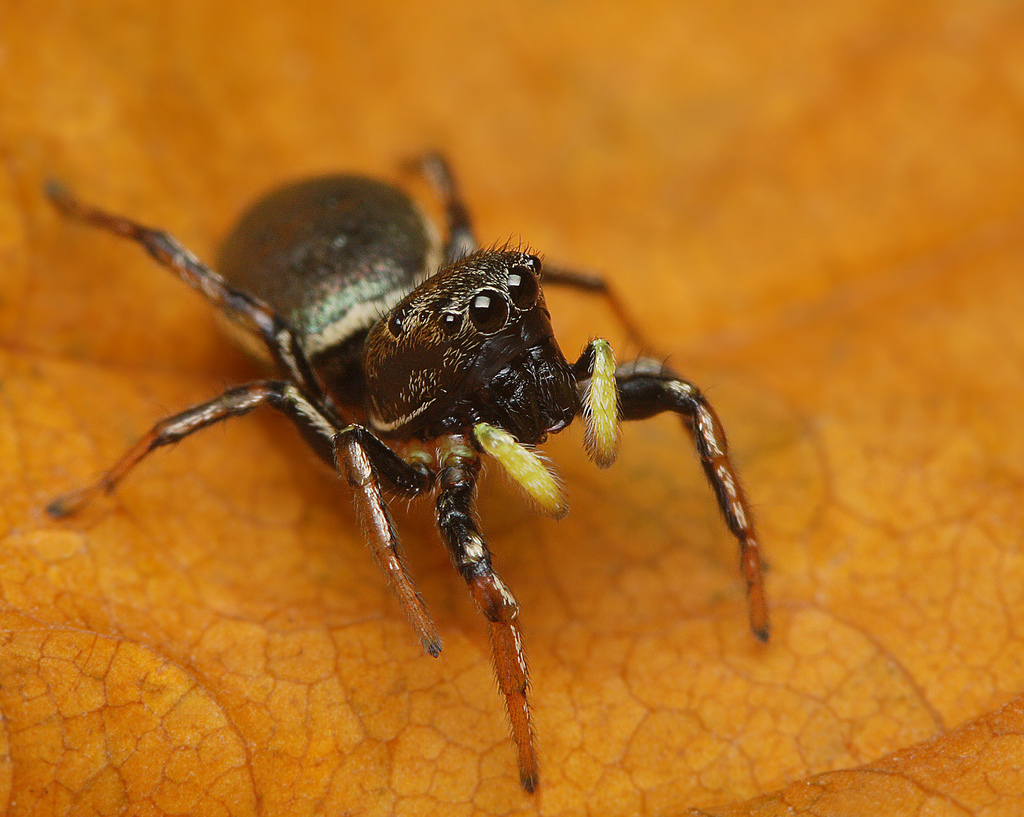
Heliophanus sp.

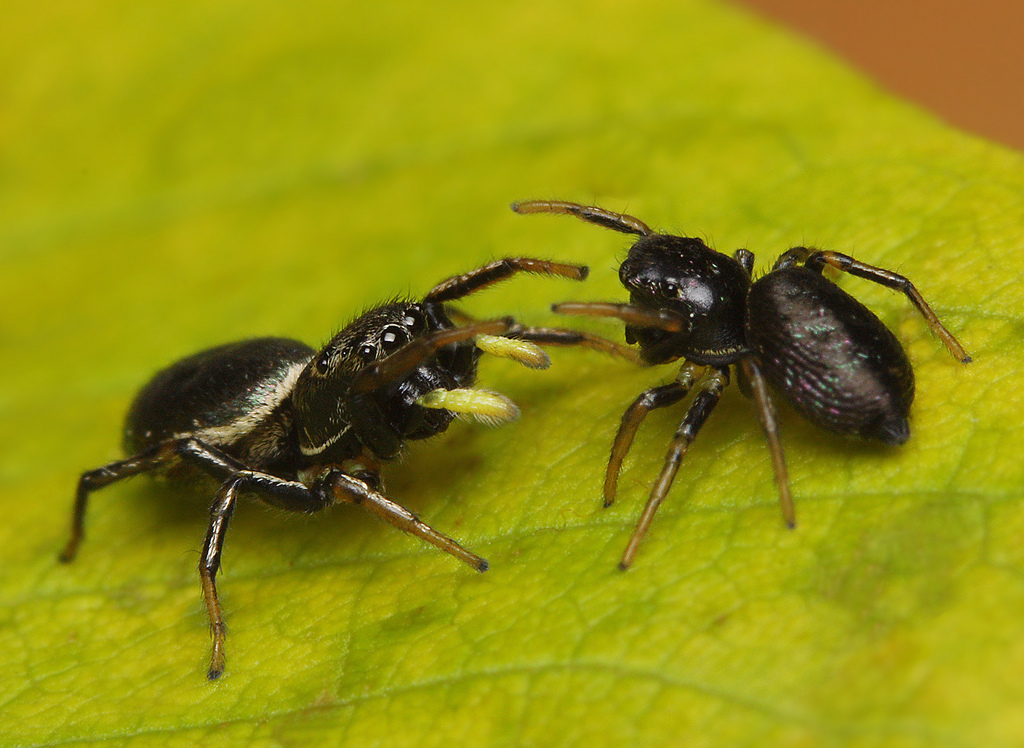
Heliophanus sp.

== Species ==
As of October 2025, this genus includes 91 species:

- Heliophanus abditus Wesołowska, 1986 – Syria, Yemen, United Arab Emirates
- Heliophanus activus (Blackwall, 1877) – Seychelles
- Heliophanus acutissimus Wesołowska, 1986 – Algeria
- Heliophanus aeneus (Hahn, 1832) – Europe, Turkey, Caucasus? Central Asia?
- Heliophanus africanus Wesołowska, 1986 – South Africa
- Heliophanus agricola Wesołowska, 1986 – Algeria, Portugal, Spain
- Heliophanus agricoloides Wunderlich, 1987 – Canary Islands
- Heliophanus apiatus Simon, 1868 – Portugal to Italy, Turkey. Introduced to United States
- Heliophanus auratus C. L. Koch, 1835 – Europe, Turkey, Caucasus, Russia (Europe to South Siberia), Kazakhstan, Central Asia, China
- Heliophanus baicalensis Kulczyński, 1895 – Russia (Middle Siberia to Far East), Mongolia, China
- Heliophanus camtschadalicus Kulczyński, 1885 – Sweden, Russia (Europe to Far East)
- Heliophanus canariensis Wesołowska, 1986 – Canary Islands
- Heliophanus chovdensis Prószyński, 1982 – Iran, Kazakhstan, Turkmenistan, Kyrgyzstan, Mongolia, China
- Heliophanus comorensis Dierkens, 2012 – Comoros, Mayotte
- Heliophanus conspicuus Wesołowska, 1986 – Algeria
- Heliophanus creticus Giltay, 1932 – Greece (Crete)
- Heliophanus cupreus (Walckenaer, 1802) – Europe, North Africa, Turkey, Caucasus, Russia (Europe to West Siberia), Iran, Afghanistan, China (type species)
- Heliophanus curvidens (O. Pickard-Cambridge, 1872) – Turkey, Caucasus, Israel to China, India
- Heliophanus cuspidatus Xiao, 2000 – China
- Heliophanus dampfi Schenkel, 1923 – Europe, Russia (Europe to Far East)
- Heliophanus decoratus L. Koch, 1875 – Mediterranean to Iran
- Heliophanus deformis Wesołowska, 1986 – Angola, South Africa
- Heliophanus designatus (G. W. Peckham & E. G. Peckham, 1903) – South Africa
- Heliophanus difficilis Wesołowska, 1986 – DR Congo, Mozambique
- Heliophanus dubius C. L. Koch, 1835 – Europe, Turkey, Caucasus, Russia (Europe to Far East), Kazakhstan, Uzbekistan, China
- Heliophanus dunini Rakov & Logunov, 1997 – Turkey, Ukraine, Caucasus, Iran, Kazakhstan
- Heliophanus encifer Simon, 1871 – Mediterranean
- Heliophanus equester L. Koch, 1867 – Italy to Azerbaijan, Iran
- Heliophanus eucharis Simon, 1887 – Ivory Coast
- Heliophanus excentricus Ledoux, 2007 – Comoros, Mayotte, Réunion
- Heliophanus falcatus Wesołowska, 1986 – DR Congo, Angola
- Heliophanus feltoni Logunov, 2009 – Turkey
- Heliophanus flavipes (Hahn, 1832) – Europe, Turkey, Caucasus, Russia (Europe to South Siberia), Kazakhstan, Iran, Central Asia, China
- Heliophanus forcipifer Kulczyński, 1895 – Armenia, Azerbaijan, Kazakhstan, Central Asia, Iran
- Heliophanus fuerteventurae Schmidt & Krause, 1996 – Canary Islands
- Heliophanus gladiator Wesołowska, 1986 – Kenya, Malawi
- Heliophanus glaucus Bösenberg & Lenz, 1895 – Libya, Egypt, Iran
- Heliophanus gramineus Wesołowska & Haddad, 2013 – South Africa
- Heliophanus hamifer Simon, 1886 – Zimbabwe, Mozambique, South Africa, Comoros, Mayotte, Seychelles, Madagascar. Introduced to Brazil
- Heliophanus haymozi Logunov, 2015 – Portugal, Spain
- Heliophanus horrifer Wesołowska, 1986 – South Africa
- Heliophanus ibericus Wesołowska, 1986 – Spain
- Heliophanus imerinensis Simon, 1901 – Madagascar
- Heliophanus improcerus Wesołowska, 1986 – DR Congo, Uganda, Mozambique
- Heliophanus innominatus Wesołowska, 1986 – Madagascar
- Heliophanus inversus Barrientos & Febrer, 2018 – Spain (Menorca)
- Heliophanus iranus Wesołowska, 1986 – Iran
- Heliophanus kankanensis Berland & Millot, 1941 – Guinea, DR Congo, Uganda, Angola
- Heliophanus kavar Logunov, 2023 – Iran
- Heliophanus kochii Simon, 1868 – Macaronesia, North Africa, Europe, Turkey, Caucasus, Middle East, Iran, Kazakhstan. Introduced to Canada, United States
- Heliophanus koktas Logunov, 1992 – Russia (Europe), Kazakhstan
- Heliophanus konradthaleri Logunov, 2009 – Turkey
- Heliophanus lawrencei Wesołowska, 1986 – Ghana, DR Congo, Angola
- Heliophanus lineiventris Simon, 1868 – Europe (not British Is., Scandinavia), Turkey, Caucasus, Russia (Europe to Far East), China, Mongolia, Korea, Japan
- Heliophanus lugubris (Vinson, 1863) – Madagascar
- Heliophanus macentensis Berland & Millot, 1941 – Guinea, Ivory Coast, DR Congo, Uganda, Kenya
- Heliophanus machaerodus Simon, 1909 – Morocco, Algeria, Tunisia
- Heliophanus malus Wesołowska, 1986 – Syria, Israel
- Heliophanus maralal Wesołowska, 2003 – Kenya
- Heliophanus mauricianus Simon, 1901 – Mauritius, Réunion
- Heliophanus mediocinctus Kulczyński, 1898 – Austria
- Heliophanus melinus L. Koch, 1867 – Europe (not British Is., Scandinavia), Turkey
- Heliophanus minimus Wesołowska & Russell-Smith, 2022 – Ivory Coast
- Heliophanus minor Dawidowicz & Wesołowska, 2016 – Kenya
- Heliophanus mordax (O. Pickard-Cambridge, 1872) – Greece and Egypt to Central Asia, Iran, Afghanistan
- Heliophanus mucronatus Simon, 1901 – Madagascar
- Heliophanus nobilis Wesołowska, 1986 – DR Congo
- Heliophanus ochrichelis Strand, 1907 – Tanzania
- Heliophanus parvus Wesołowska & van Harten, 1994 – Yemen (Socotra)
- Heliophanus patagiatus Thorell, 1875 – Europe, Turkey, Caucasus, Russia (Europe to Far East), Kazakhstan, Central Asia, China, Mongolia
- Heliophanus potanini Schenkel, 1963 – Russia (Europe), Iran, Kazakhstan, Afghanistan, Central Asia, Mongolia, China
- Heliophanus pratti G. W. Peckham & E. G. Peckham, 1903 – Namibia, South Africa
- Heliophanus pygmaeus Wesołowska & Russell-Smith, 2000 – Senegal, Tanzania, Zimbabwe, Mozambique, South Africa
- Heliophanus ramosus Wesołowska, 1986 – Algeria, Portugal, Spain
- Heliophanus rufithorax Simon, 1868 – Southern Europe to Central Asia
- Heliophanus similior Ledoux, 2007 – Réunion
- Heliophanus simplex Simon, 1868 – Europe, Turkey, Russia (Caucasus), China
- Heliophanus sinaicus Logunov, 2015 – Egypt
- Heliophanus sororius Wesołowska, 2003 – South Africa, Lesotho
- Heliophanus splendidus Wesołowska, 2003 – Nigeria, Congo
- Heliophanus stylifer Simon, 1878 – Morocco, Algeria, Tunisia
- Heliophanus tenuitas Wesołowska, 2011 – Zimbabwe
- Heliophanus tribulosus Simon, 1868 – Europe to Kazakhstan
- Heliophanus turanicus Charitonov, 1969 – Kazakhstan, Central Asia
- Heliophanus ussuricus Kulczyński, 1895 – Russia (West Siberia to Far East), Mongolia, China, Korea, Japan
- Heliophanus uvirensis Wesołowska, 1986 – Congo
- Heliophanus variabilis (Vinson, 1863) – Réunion
- Heliophanus verus Wesołowska, 1986 – Azerbaijan, Iran
- Heliophanus wesolowskae Rakov & Logunov, 1997 – Central Asia
- Heliophanus wulingensis Peng & Xie, 1996 – China
- Heliophanus xerxesi Logunov, 2009 – Iran
