= F. laeta =

F. laeta may refer to:

- Ficus laeta, a hemiepiphytic tree
- Frontina laeta, a tachina fly
- Frontinella laeta, a sheet weaver
