= Cynapes wrighti =

Conservation status
- Endangered (IUCN 3.1)

Scientific classification
- Kingdom: Animalia
- Phylum: Arthropoda
- Subphylum: Chelicerata
- Class: Arachnida
- Order: Araneae
- Infraorder: Araneomorphae
- Family: Salticidae
- Genus: Cynapes
- Species: C. wrighti

Binomial name
- Cynapes wrighti (Blackwall, 1877)

Species of spider

Cynapes wrighti is a species of spider from the family Salticidae. The species is endemic to Mahé Island of Seychelles.
