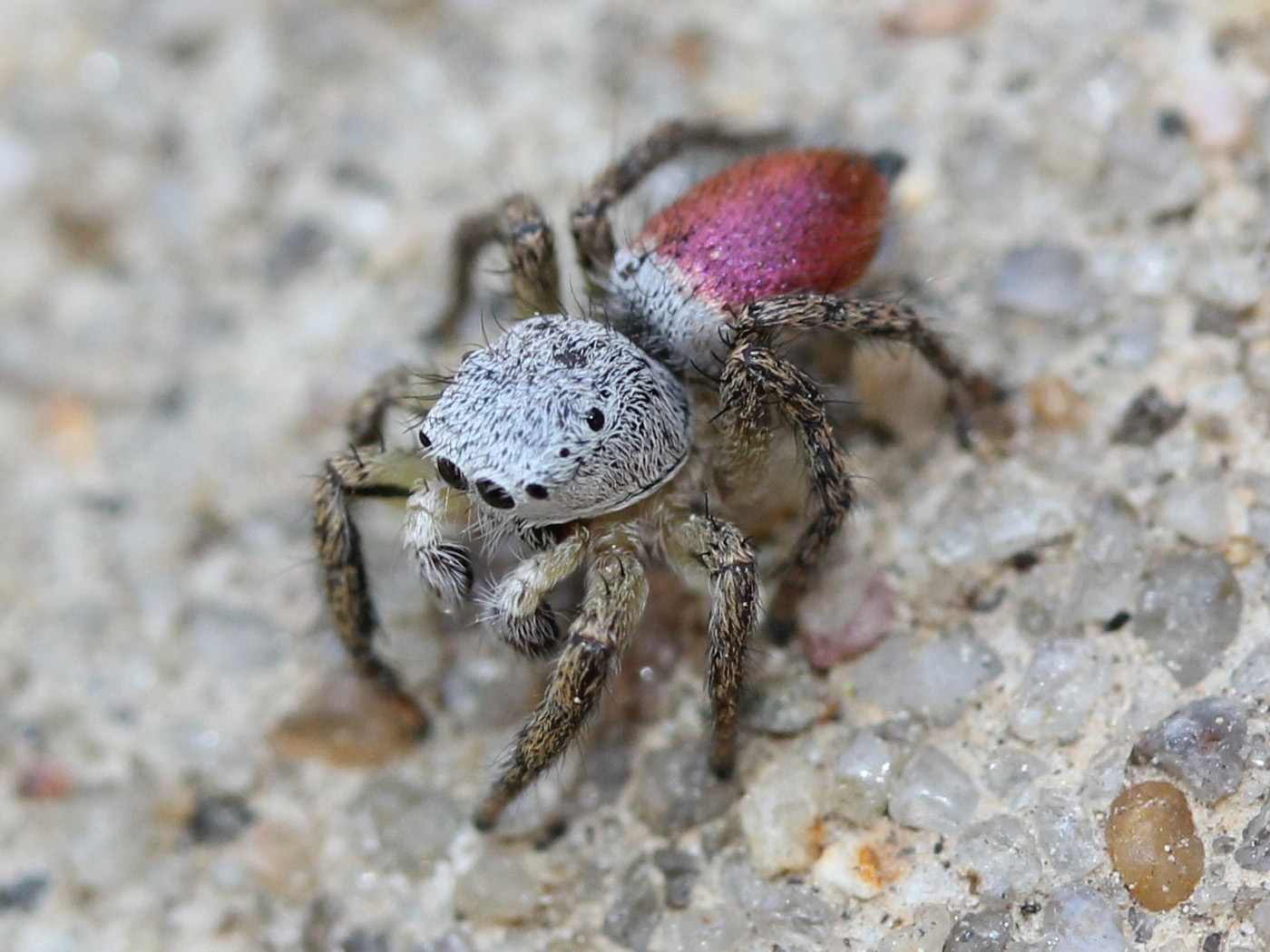
- Male
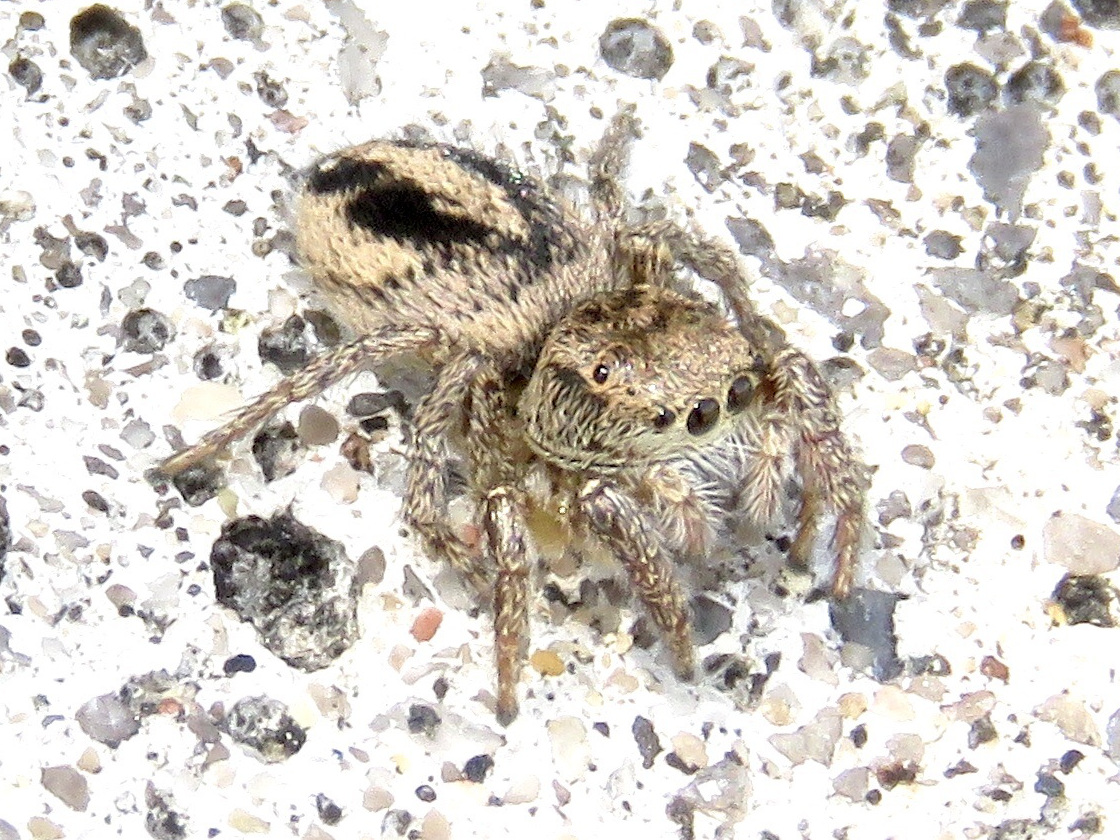
- Female

Scientific classification
- Kingdom: Animalia
- Phylum: Arthropoda
- Subphylum: Chelicerata
- Class: Arachnida
- Order: Araneae
- Infraorder: Araneomorphae
- Family: Salticidae
- Genus: Habronattus
- Species: H. decorus

Binomial name
- Habronattus decorus (Blackwall, 1846)

Synonyms
- List: Attus roseus Hentz, 1846; Attus splendens Peckham & Peckham, 1883; Habrocestum splendens (Peckham & Peckham, 1883); Habronattus decorus (Blackwall, 1846); Pellenes decorus (Blackwall, 1846); Pellenes nigriceps Keyserling, 1885; Pellenes roseus (Hentz, 1846); Pellenes splendens (Peckham & Peckham, 1883); Salticus decorus Blackwall, 1846

= Habronattus decorus =

Species of spider

Habronattus decorus is a species of jumping spider. It is found in the United States and Canada. Males have a reddish patch covering most of the upper surface of their abdomens.

== Taxonomy ==
The species was first described by the English naturalist John Blackwall in 1846 as Salticus decorus. Blackwall described only the male. In 1883, George and Elizabeth Peckham described both sexes as a new species, Attus splendens. They later transferred their species to the genus Pellenes. In 1944, Arthur M. Chickering recognized that the Peckham's Attus splendens was the same species as Blackwall's Salticus decorus, synonymizing them, along with some other species names, as Habronattus decorus.

== Description ==
The male has a body length of about 5 mm (0.2 in), with the cephalothorax making up slightly more than half of this length. The black to brownish carapace is overlaid with irregular lines of gray to white scales. Specimens from peninsular Florida often have iridescent scales in the ocular area. Most of the upper surface of the abdomen is occupied by a dark reddish patch covered by iridescent rose to bluish scales. Individuals vary considerably in coloration. The female is larger, with a body length of about 6.5 mm (0.3 in). The carapace has fewer white hairs. The red pigment and iridescent rose scales of the male abdomen are absent, being replaced by a number of dark brown stripes, with two wider ones surrounding a central yellowish area.

== Distribution ==
Habronattus decorus is found across the northern United States and southern Canada. Further south, its range is restricted to the eastern side of the United States, from Texas to Florida. It is not known to occur in the area from California to western Texas.
