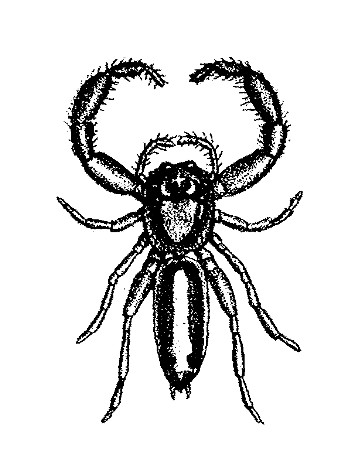
- C. baptizatus from Rodrigues

Scientific classification
- Kingdom: Animalia
- Phylum: Arthropoda
- Subphylum: Chelicerata
- Class: Arachnida
- Order: Araneae
- Infraorder: Araneomorphae
- Family: Salticidae
- Subfamily: Salticinae
- Genus: Cynapes; Simon, 1900

Type species
- C. wrighti (Blackwall, 1877)

Species
- 4, see text

= Cynapes =

Genus of spiders

Cynapes is a genus of African jumping spiders that was first described by Eugène Louis Simon in 1900.

== Species ==
As of June 2019 it contains four species, found only in Africa:

- Cynapes baptizatus (Butler, 1876) – Mauritius (Rodriguez)
- Cynapes canosus Simon, 1900 – Mauritius
- Cynapes lineatus (Vinson, 1863) – Réunion, Mauritius
- Cynapes wrighti (Blackwall, 1877) (type) – Seychelles
