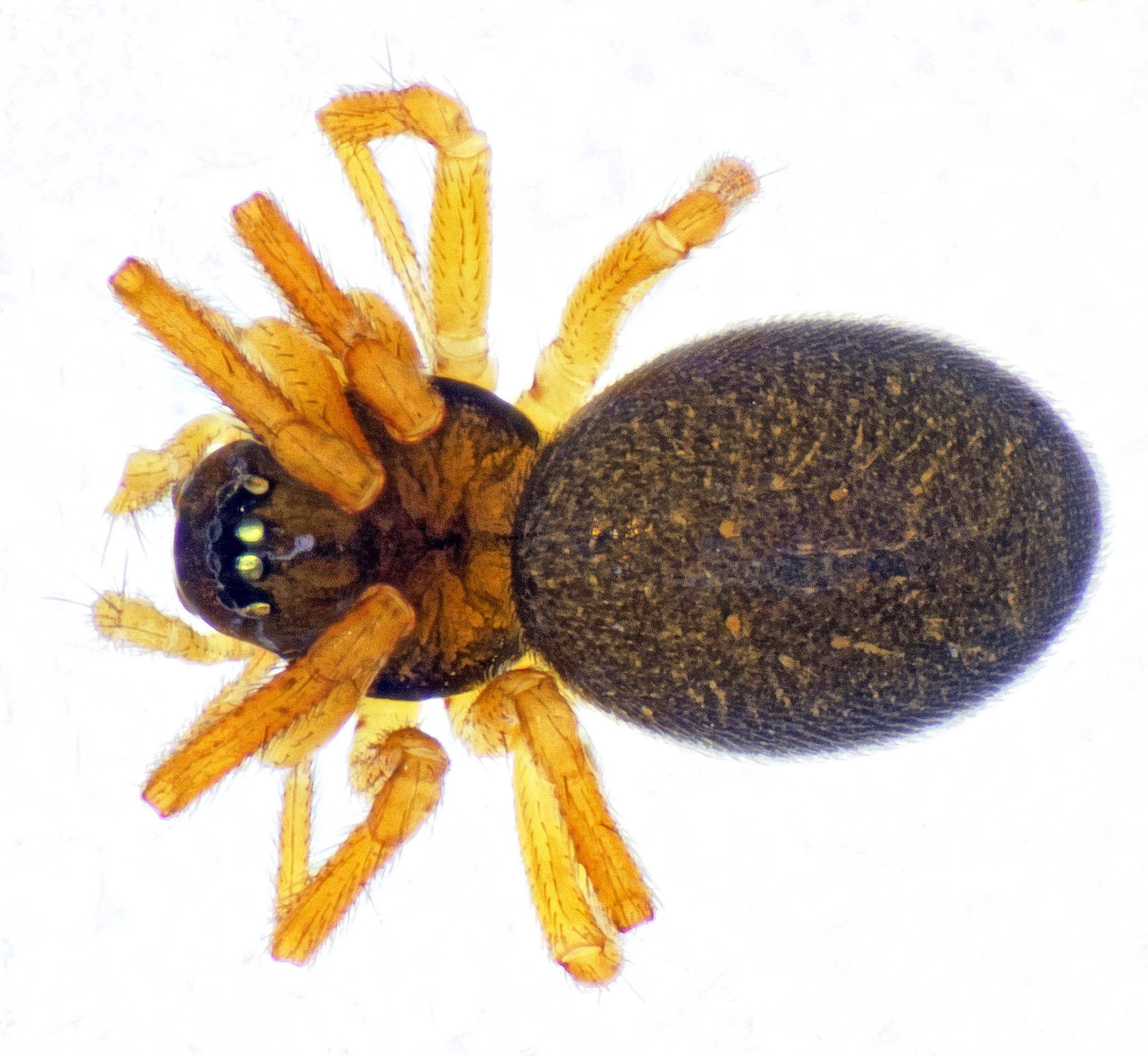
- Dismodicus bifrons

Scientific classification
- Kingdom: Animalia
- Phylum: Arthropoda
- Subphylum: Chelicerata
- Class: Arachnida
- Order: Araneae
- Infraorder: Araneomorphae
- Family: Linyphiidae
- Genus: Dismodicus; Simon, 1884

Type species
- D. bifrons (Blackwall, 1841)

Species
- 6, see text

= Dismodicus =

Genus of spiders

Dismodicus is a genus of dwarf spiders that was first described by Eugène Louis Simon in 1884.

== Species ==
As of May 2019 it contains six species:

- Dismodicus alticeps Chamberlin & Ivie, 1947 – Russia (Far East), Canada, USA
- Dismodicus bifrons (Blackwall, 1841) (type) – Europe, Russia (Europe to Far East)
- Dismodicus decemoculatus (Emerton, 1882) – USA, Canada, Greenland
- Dismodicus elevatus (C. L. Koch, 1838) – Europe, Russia (Europe to West Siberia)
- Dismodicus fungiceps Denis, 1945 – France
- Dismodicus modicus Chamberlin & Ivie, 1947 – USA (Alaska)
