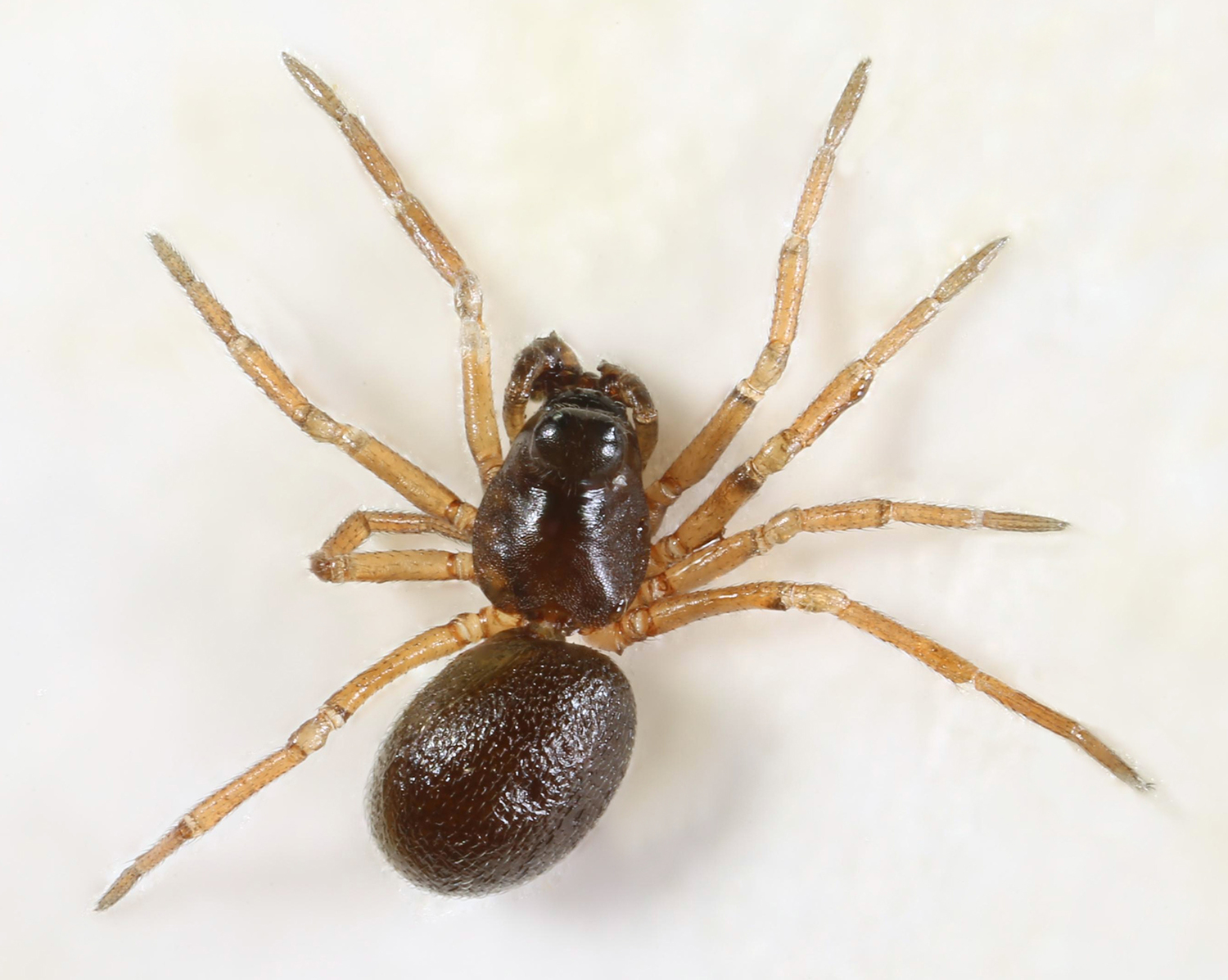
- Parapelecopsis nemoralis

Scientific classification
- Kingdom: Animalia
- Phylum: Arthropoda
- Subphylum: Chelicerata
- Class: Arachnida
- Order: Araneae
- Infraorder: Araneomorphae
- Family: Linyphiidae
- Genus: Parapelecopsis; Wunderlich, 1992

Type species
- P. nemoralis (Blackwall, 1841)

Species
- 4, see text

= Parapelecopsis =

Genus of spiders

Parapelecopsis is a genus of dwarf spiders that was first described by J. Wunderlich in 1992. The spider is found in woodlands in leaf litter, pine needles, moss at ground level and lichen and moss on tree trunks.

== Species ==
As of May 2019 it contains four species:

- Parapelecopsis conimbricensis Bosmans & Crespo, 2010 – Portugal
- Parapelecopsis mediocris (Kulczyński, 1899) – Madeira
- Parapelecopsis nemoralioides (O. Pickard-Cambridge, 1884) – Europe
- Parapelecopsis nemoralis (Blackwall, 1841) (type) – Europe, Georgia
