= F. communis =

F. communis may refer to:

- Ferula communis, the giant fennel, a plant species in the genus Ferula
- Frontinella communis, the bowl and doily spider, a sheet weaver spider species

== See also ==
- Communis (disambiguation)
