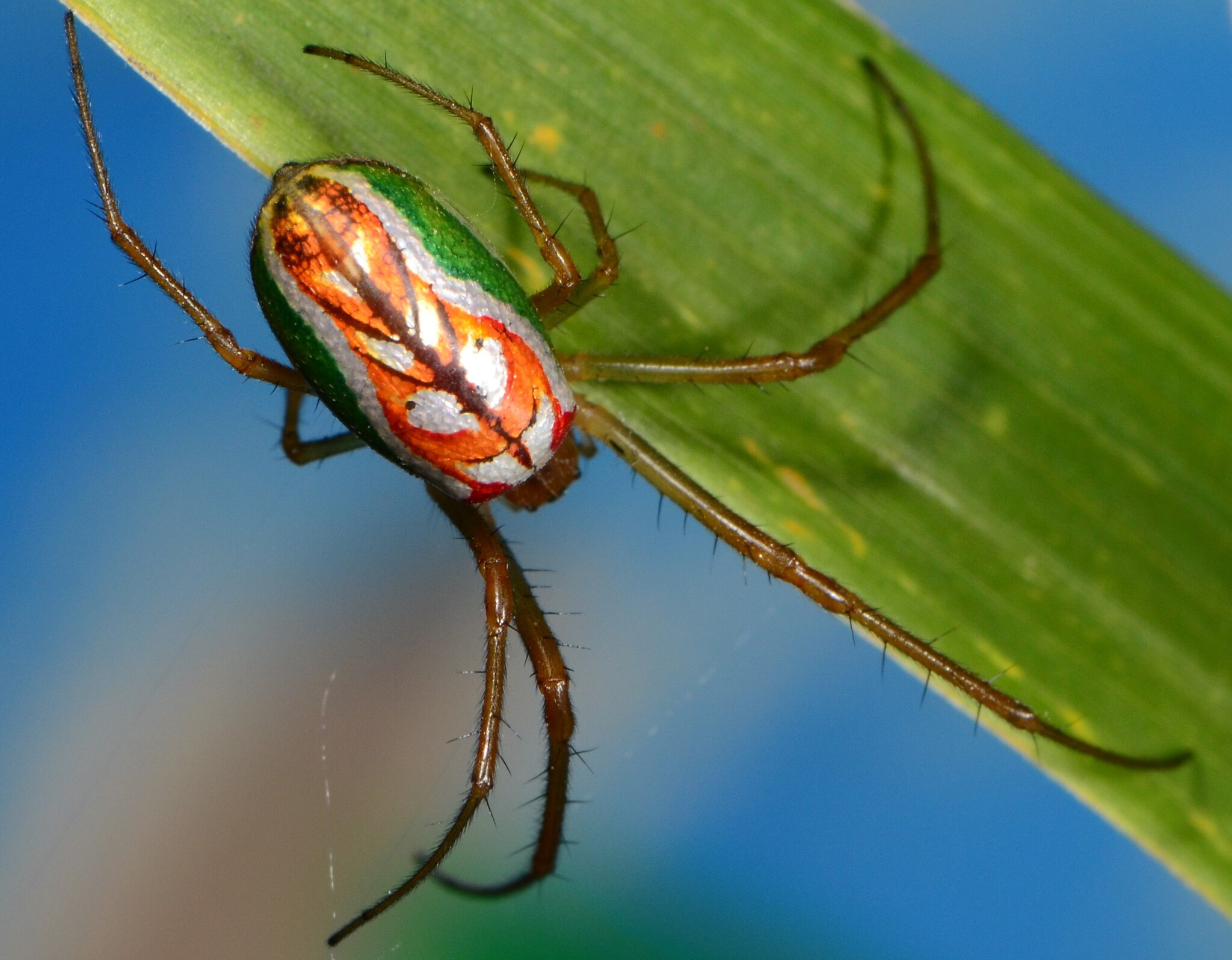
- female
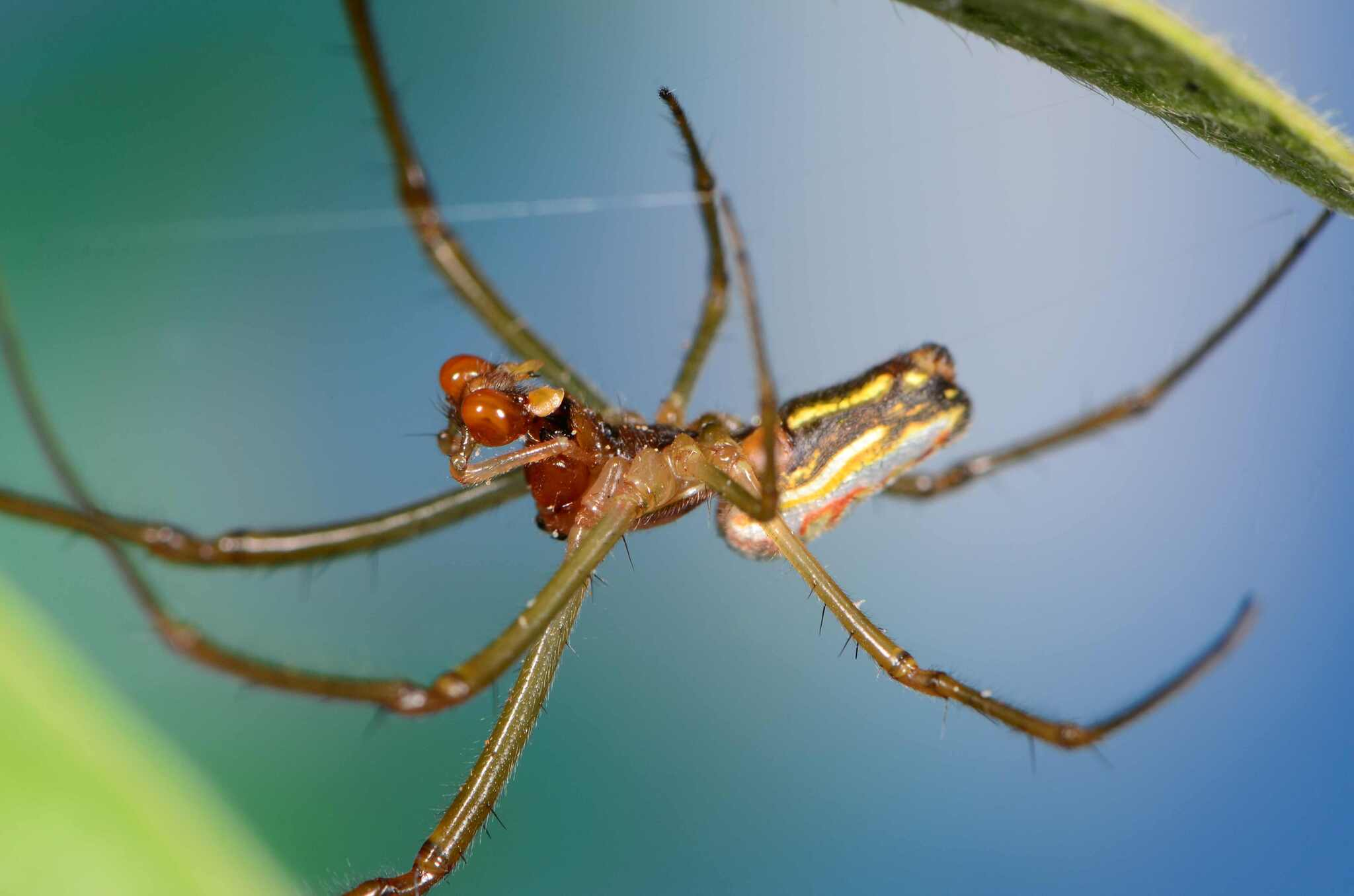
- male

Scientific classification
- Kingdom: Animalia
- Phylum: Arthropoda
- Subphylum: Chelicerata
- Class: Arachnida
- Order: Araneae
- Infraorder: Araneomorphae
- Family: Tetragnathidae
- Genus: Leucauge
- Species: L. festiva

Binomial name
- Leucauge festiva (Blackwall, 1866)
- blue: reported countries (WSC) green: observation hotspots (iNaturalist)

Synonyms
- Tetragnatha festiva Blackwall, 1866; Meta splendida Butler, 1883

= Leucauge festiva =

Festiva Silver Vlei Spider

Species of spider

Leucauge festiva is a species of spider in the family Tetragnathidae. It is commonly known as the festiva silver vlei spider.

== Distribution ==
Leucauge festiva has a widespread distribution throughout Africa, including Ethiopia, Sudan, Kenya, Tanzania, Equatorial Africa, Namibia, South Africa, Eswatini, and Madagascar.

In South Africa, the species is found in all provinces.

== Habitat and ecology ==
The species makes orb-webs, sometimes near water or in shaded damp areas. They are active during the day, hanging head down in their webs.

L. festiva has been sampled from Fynbos, Forest, Indian Ocean Coastal Belt, Grassland, Nama Karoo, and Savanna biomes at altitudes ranging from 15 to 1,999 m. It has also been sampled from avocado and macadamia orchards as well as pumpkin and tomato fields.

== Description ==
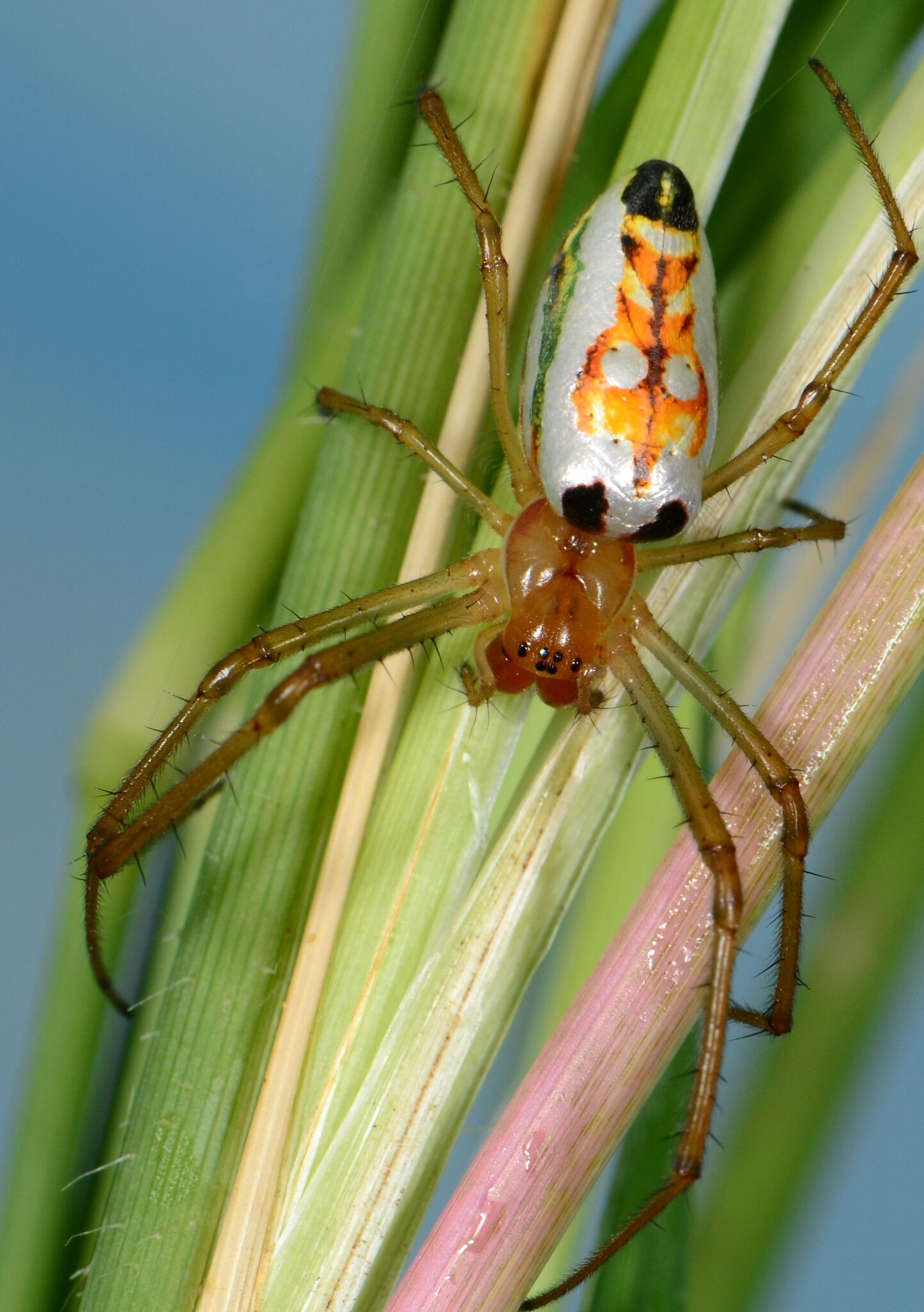
female

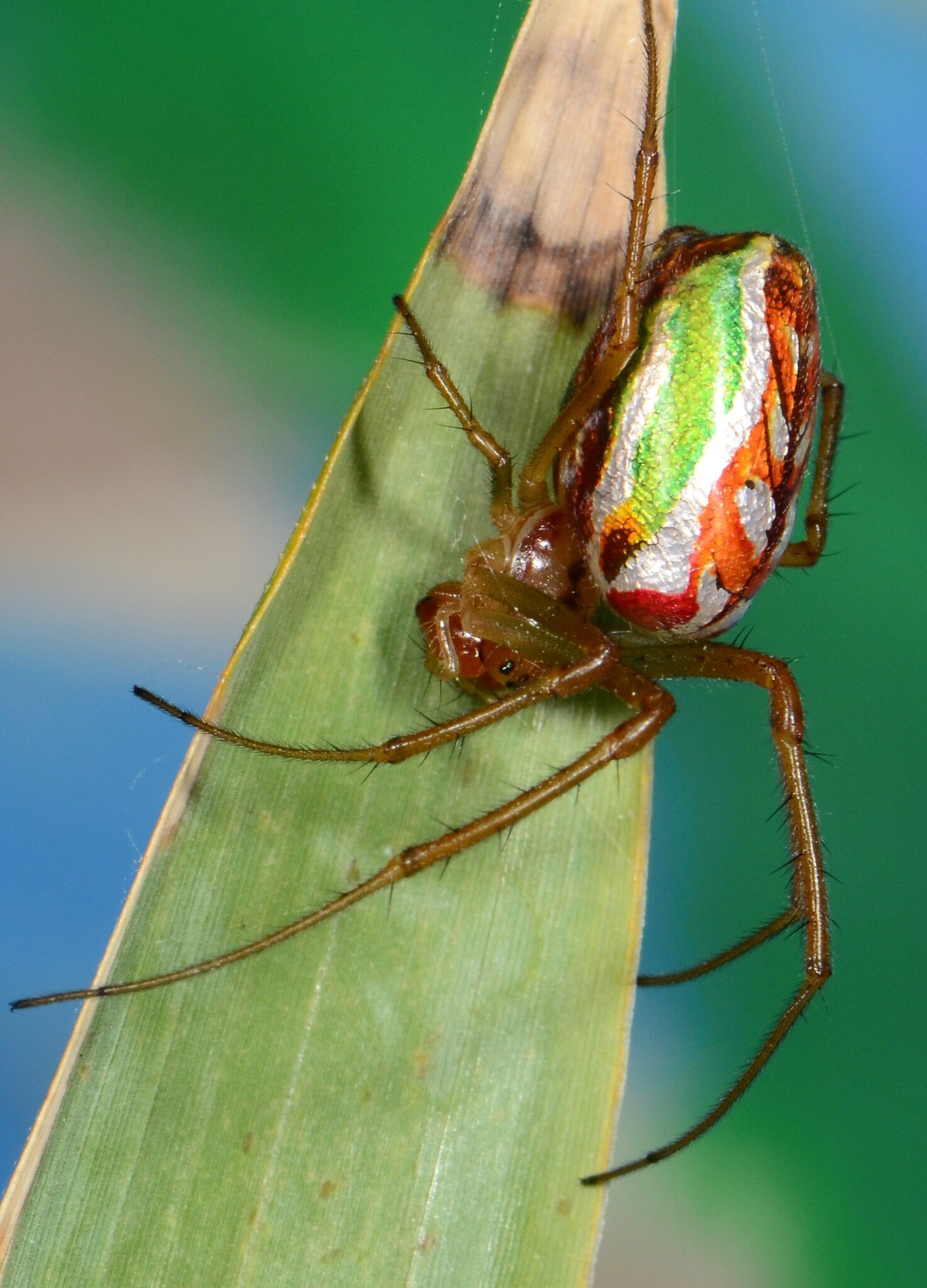
female

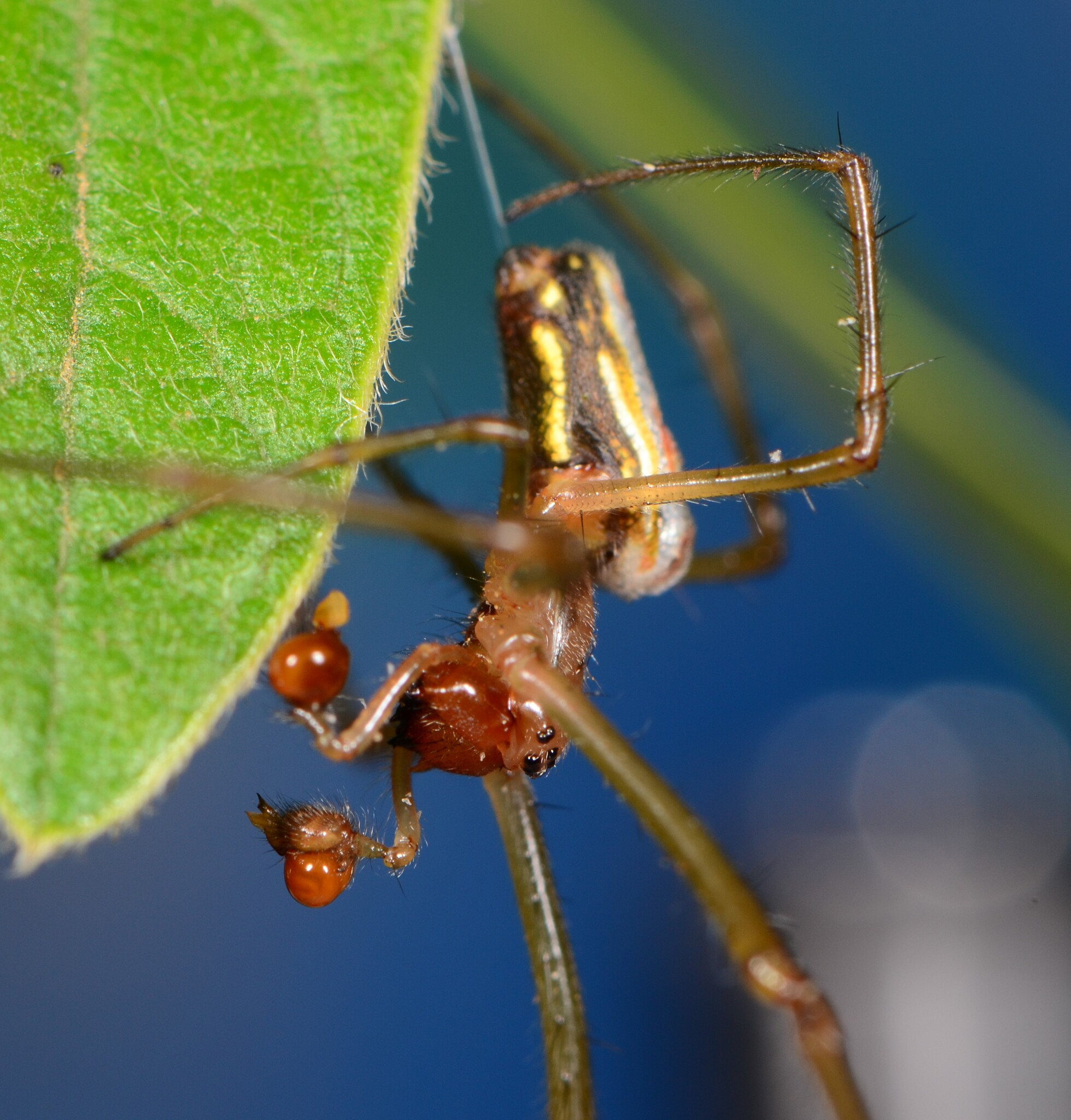
male

The species is medium-sized with an elongate abdomen featuring a brightly coloured mask-like pattern. The posterior end is blunt.

The epigyne has a scape. Male chelicerae have tubercles.

== Conservation ==
Leucauge festiva is listed as Least Concern by the South African National Biodiversity Institute due to its wide geographical range. The species is protected in more than ten protected areas.

== Taxonomy ==
The species was originally described by John Blackwall in 1866 from Equatorial Africa as Tetragnatha festiva.
