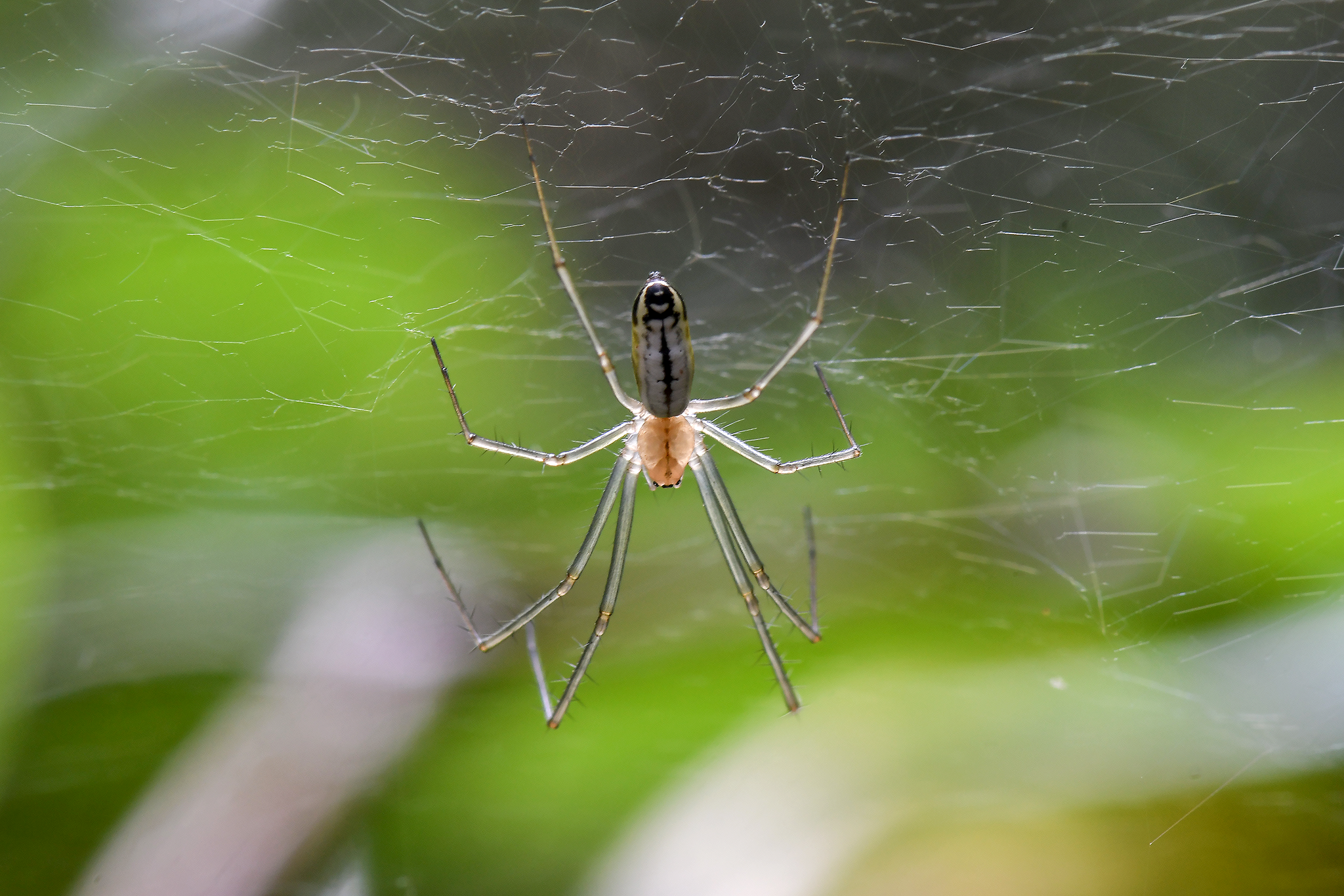

Scientific classification
- Domain: Eukaryota
- Kingdom: Animalia
- Phylum: Arthropoda
- Subphylum: Chelicerata
- Class: Arachnida
- Order: Araneae
- Infraorder: Araneomorphae
- Family: Linyphiidae
- Genus: Neriene
- Species: N. litigiosa

Binomial name
- Neriene litigiosa (Keyserling, 1886)

= Neriene litigiosa =

Species of spider

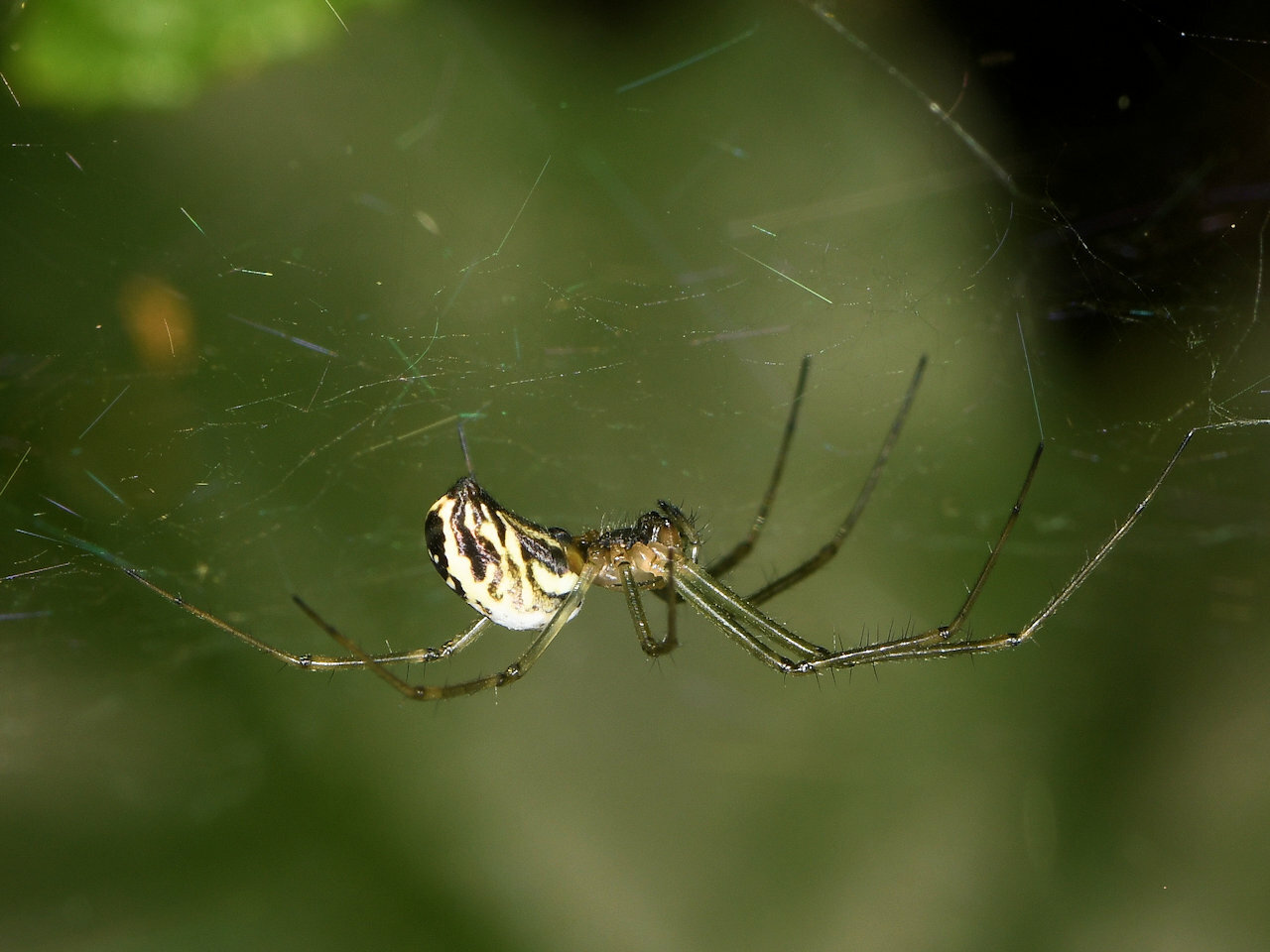
Neriene litigiosa, California

Neriene litigiosa, the sierra dome spider, is a species of sheet weaver spider in the family Linyphiidae. It is found in North America and has been introduced into China. This species' complex mating system has been under study since 1980 at University of Montana's Flathead Lake Biological Station by Dr. Paul J. Watson.
