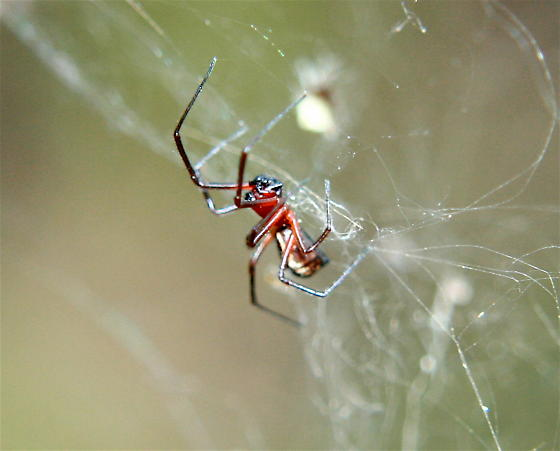
- Male bowl and doily spider(F. communis)

Scientific classification
- Kingdom: Animalia
- Phylum: Arthropoda
- Subphylum: Chelicerata
- Class: Arachnida
- Order: Araneae
- Infraorder: Araneomorphae
- Family: Linyphiidae
- Genus: Frontinella; F. O. Pickard-Cambridge, 1902

Type species
- F. laeta (O. Pickard-Cambridge, 1898)

Species
- 9, see text

= Frontinella =

Genus of spiders

Frontinella is a genus of dwarf spiders that was first described by Frederick Octavius Pickard-Cambridge in 1902.

== Species ==
As of May 2019 it contains nine species and one subspecies, found in China, El Salvador, Mexico, and the United States:

- Frontinella bella Bryant, 1948 – Hispaniola
- Frontinella huachuca Gertsch & Davis, 1946 – USA, Mexico
  - Frontinella h. benevola Gertsch & Davis, 1946 – Mexico, Arizona
- Frontinella hubeiensis Li & Song, 1993 – China
- Frontinella laeta (O. Pickard-Cambridge, 1898) (type) – Mexico
- Frontinella omega Kraus, 1955 – El Salvador
- Frontinella potosia Gertsch & Davis, 1946 – Mexico
- Frontinella pyramitela (Walckenaer, 1841) – North, Central America
- Frontinella tibialis F. O. Pickard-Cambridge, 1902 – Mexico
- Frontinella zhui Li & Song, 1993 – China

== See also ==
- Neriene
