= Frontinella huachuca =

Scientific classification
- Domain: Eukaryota
- Kingdom: Animalia
- Phylum: Arthropoda
- Subphylum: Chelicerata
- Class: Arachnida
- Order: Araneae
- Infraorder: Araneomorphae
- Family: Linyphiidae
- Genus: Frontinella
- Species: F. huachuca

Binomial name
- Frontinella huachuca Gertsch & Davis, 1946

Species of spider

Frontinella huachuca is a species of sheetweb spider in the family Linyphiidae. It is found in the United States and Mexico.

== Subspecies ==
These two subspecies belong to the species Frontinella huachuca:

- (Frontinella huachuca huachuca) Gertsch & Davis, 1946
- Frontinella huachuca benevola Gertsch & Davis, 1946
