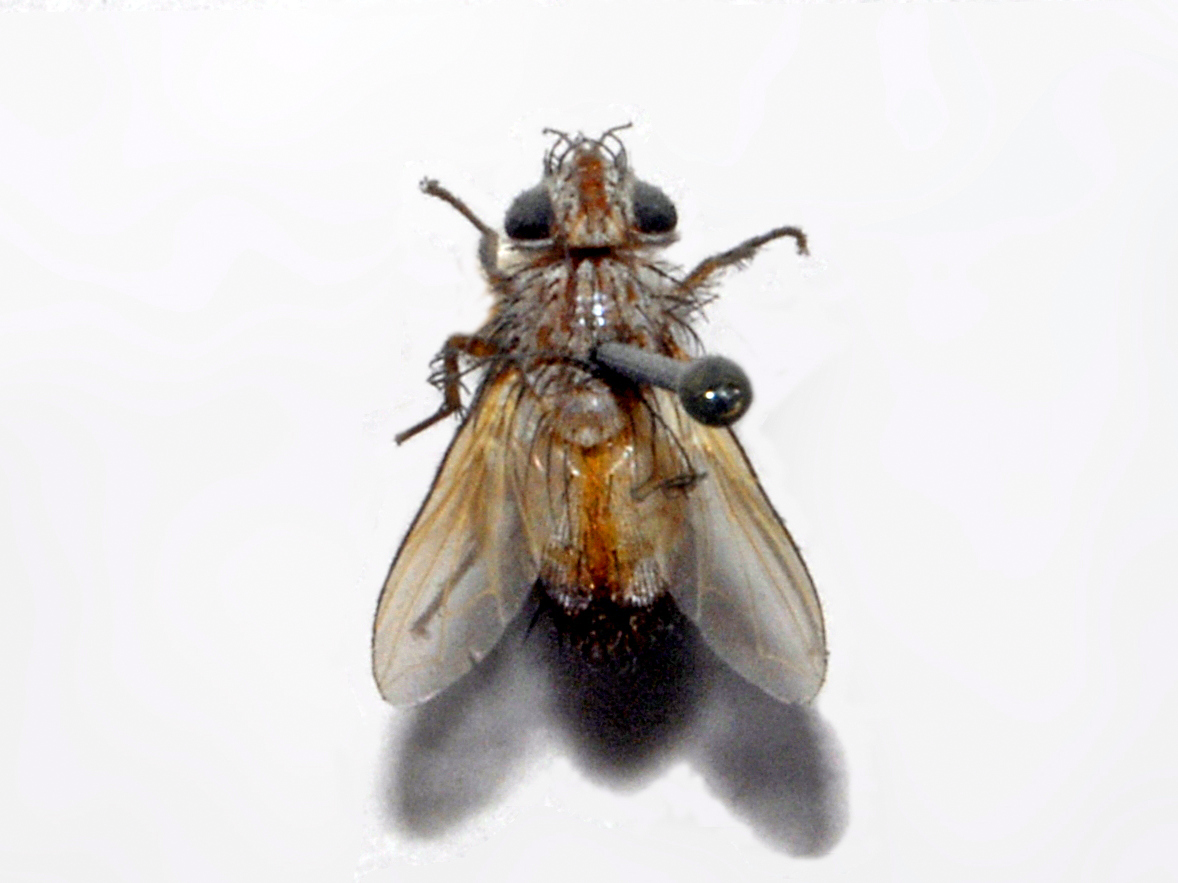
- Frontina laeta

Scientific classification
- Kingdom: Animalia
- Phylum: Arthropoda
- Class: Insecta
- Order: Diptera
- Family: Tachinidae
- Subfamily: Exoristinae
- Tribe: Goniini
- Genus: Frontina; Meigen, 1838

Type species
- Tachina laeta Meigen, 1838

= Frontina =

Genus of flies

Frontina is a genus of flies in the family Tachinidae.

== Species ==
- Frontina adusta (Walker, 1853)
- Frontina femorata Shima, 1988
- Frontina laeta (Meigen, 1824)
- Frontina nigrotibialis Shima, 1968
- Frontina tricolor Shima, 1988
