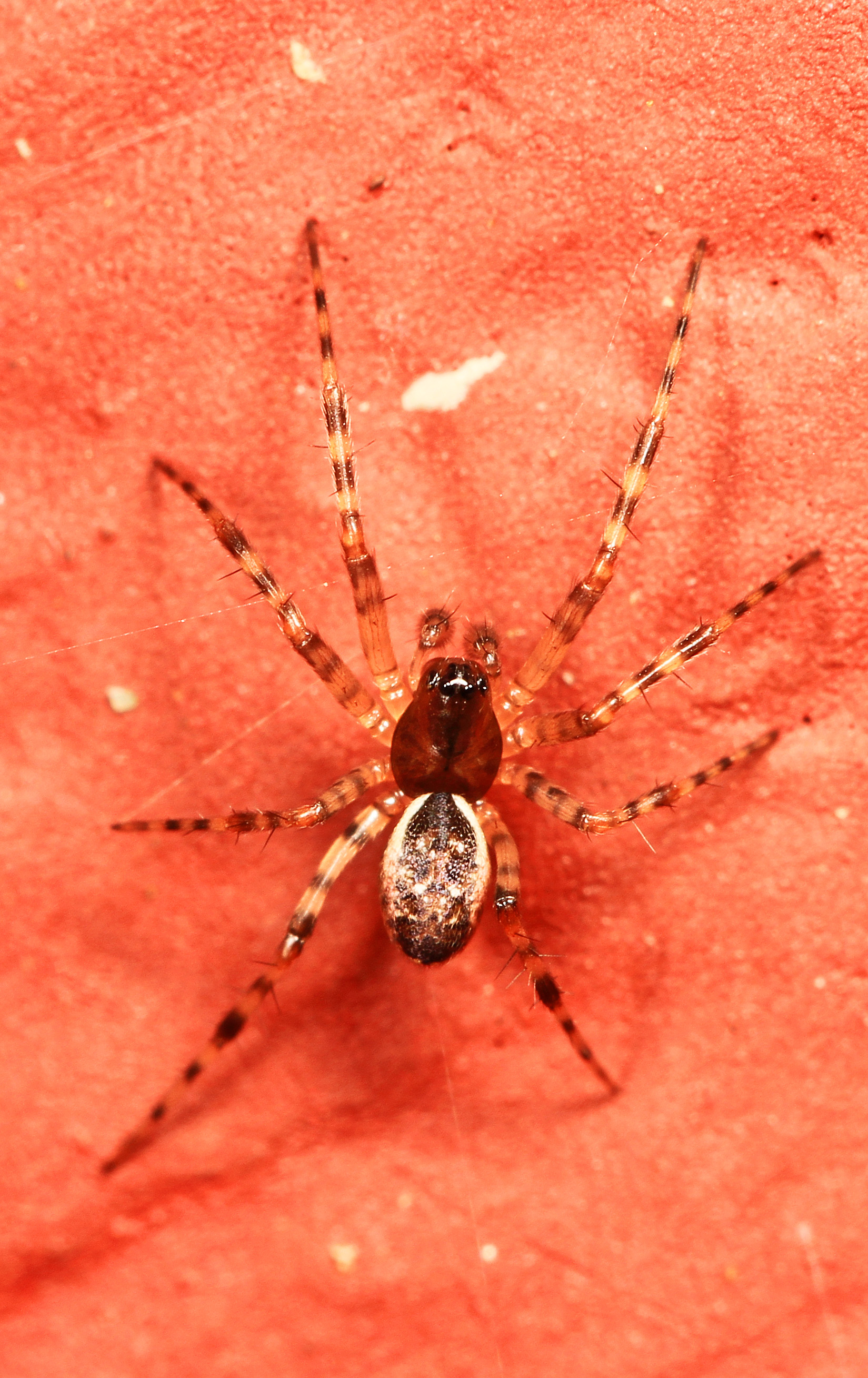

Scientific classification
- Domain: Eukaryota
- Kingdom: Animalia
- Phylum: Arthropoda
- Subphylum: Chelicerata
- Class: Arachnida
- Order: Araneae
- Infraorder: Araneomorphae
- Family: Linyphiidae
- Genus: Neriene
- Species: N. digna

Binomial name
- Neriene digna (Keyserling, 1886)

= Neriene digna =

Species of spider

Neriene digna is a species of sheetweb spider in the family Linyphiidae. It is found in the United States and Canada.
