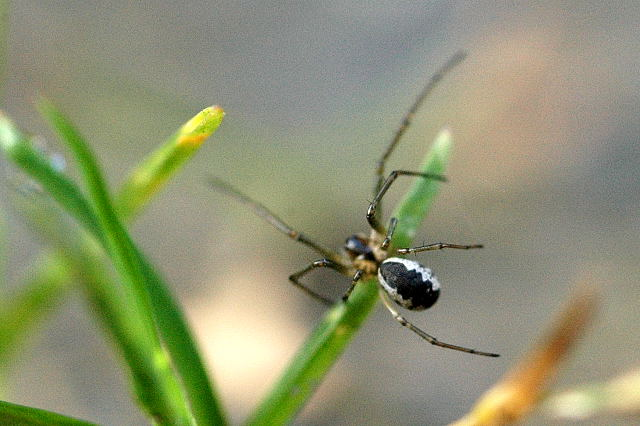
- Male

Scientific classification
- Domain: Eukaryota
- Kingdom: Animalia
- Phylum: Arthropoda
- Subphylum: Chelicerata
- Class: Arachnida
- Order: Araneae
- Infraorder: Araneomorphae
- Family: Linyphiidae
- Genus: Neriene
- Species: N. peltata

Binomial name
- Neriene peltata Wider, 1834

= Neriene peltata =

Species of spider

Neriene peltata is a species of spider belonging to the family Linyphiidae. It has a Holarctic distribution.

Like other members of this family, this is a small spider: the body length excluding legs is about 5 mm. The carapace is brown with a black central stripe. The abdomen is striped brown and white. It builds a hammock-shaped web among bushes which it rests beneath.
