= Neriene variabilis =

Scientific classification
- Domain: Eukaryota
- Kingdom: Animalia
- Phylum: Arthropoda
- Subphylum: Chelicerata
- Class: Arachnida
- Order: Araneae
- Infraorder: Araneomorphae
- Family: Linyphiidae
- Genus: Neriene
- Species: N. variabilis

Binomial name
- Neriene variabilis (Banks, 1892)

Species of spider

Neriene variabilis is a species of sheetweb spider in the family Linyphiidae. It is found in the United States.
