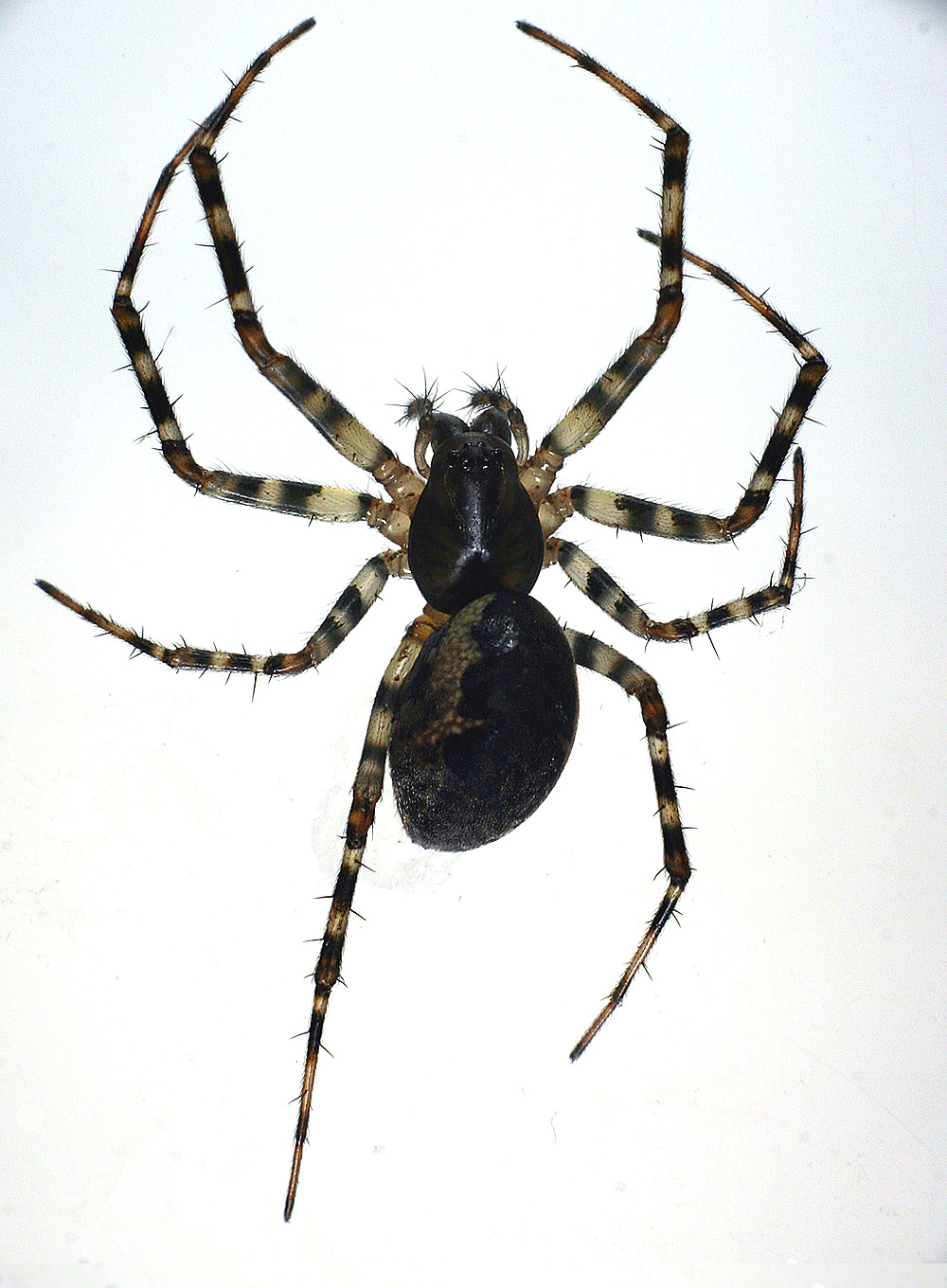

Scientific classification
- Domain: Eukaryota
- Kingdom: Animalia
- Phylum: Arthropoda
- Subphylum: Chelicerata
- Class: Arachnida
- Order: Araneae
- Infraorder: Araneomorphae
- Family: Linyphiidae
- Genus: Neriene
- Species: N. montana

Binomial name
- Neriene montana Clerck, 1757

Synonyms
- Araneus montana Erigone montana Linyphia montana

= Neriene montana =

Species of spider

Neriene montana (syn. Linyphia montana) is a species of spider belonging to the family Linyphiidae. With a holarctic distribution, it is found throughout northern Europe.

The body length excluding legs is about 4 to 7 mm in both sexes, males having a slimmer abdomen. The carapace is dark brown with a darker midline and margins. The abdomen is marked with a broad brown folium with pale speckles and small indentations, surrounded by a pale area. The legs are yellow-brown with many annulations which, along with its size, help to distinguish N. montana from similar species. It builds a hammock-shaped web among bushes or low vegetation, on tree trunks, or under logs, which it rests beneath.
