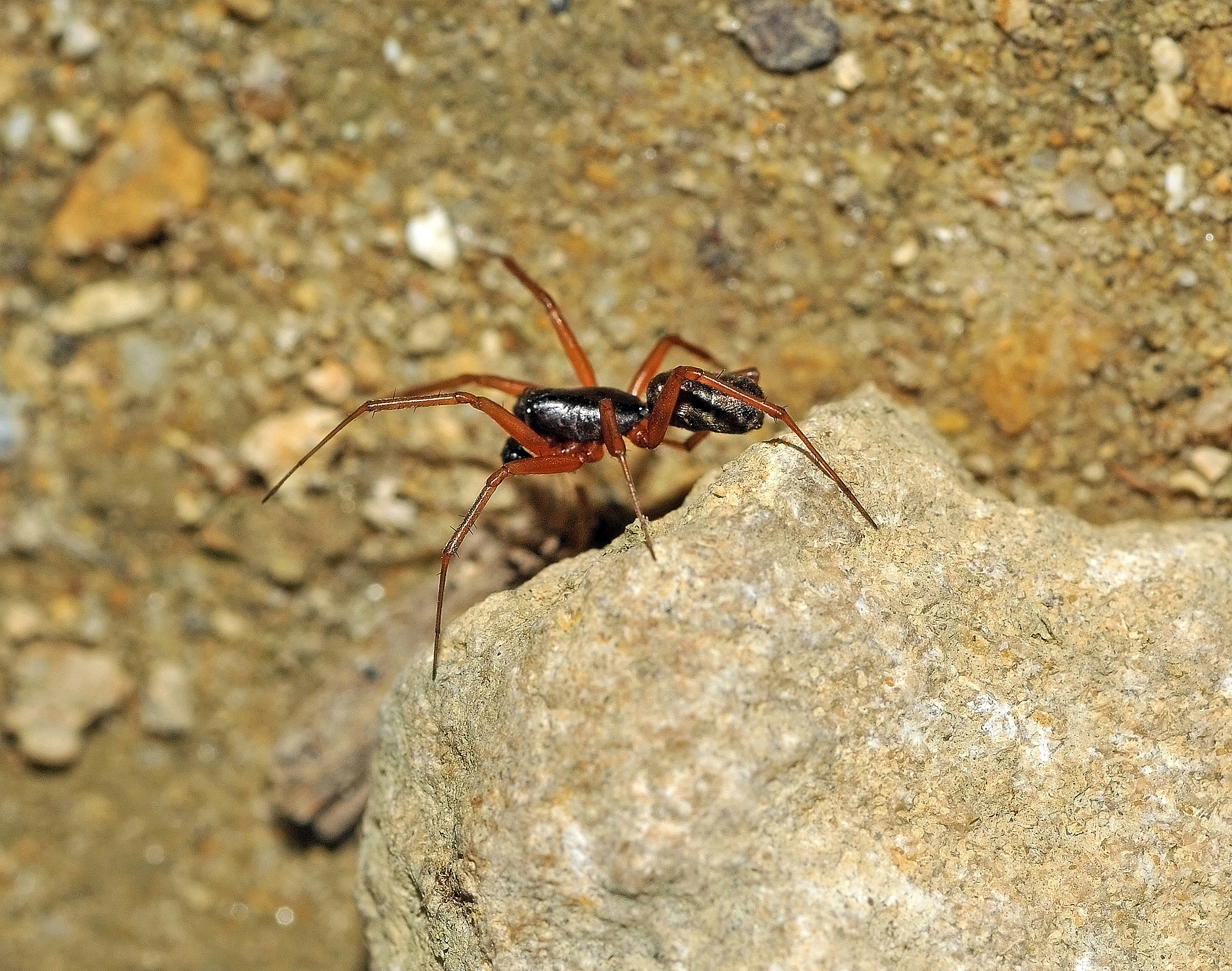

Scientific classification
- Domain: Eukaryota
- Kingdom: Animalia
- Phylum: Arthropoda
- Subphylum: Chelicerata
- Class: Arachnida
- Order: Araneae
- Infraorder: Araneomorphae
- Family: Linyphiidae
- Genus: Neriene
- Species: N. clathrata

Binomial name
- Neriene clathrata (Sundevall, 1830)

= Neriene clathrata =

Species of spider

Neriene clathrata is a species of sheetweb spider in the family Linyphiidae. It is found in North America, Europe, North Africa, Caucasus, a range from Russia (European to Far East), China, Korea, and Japan.

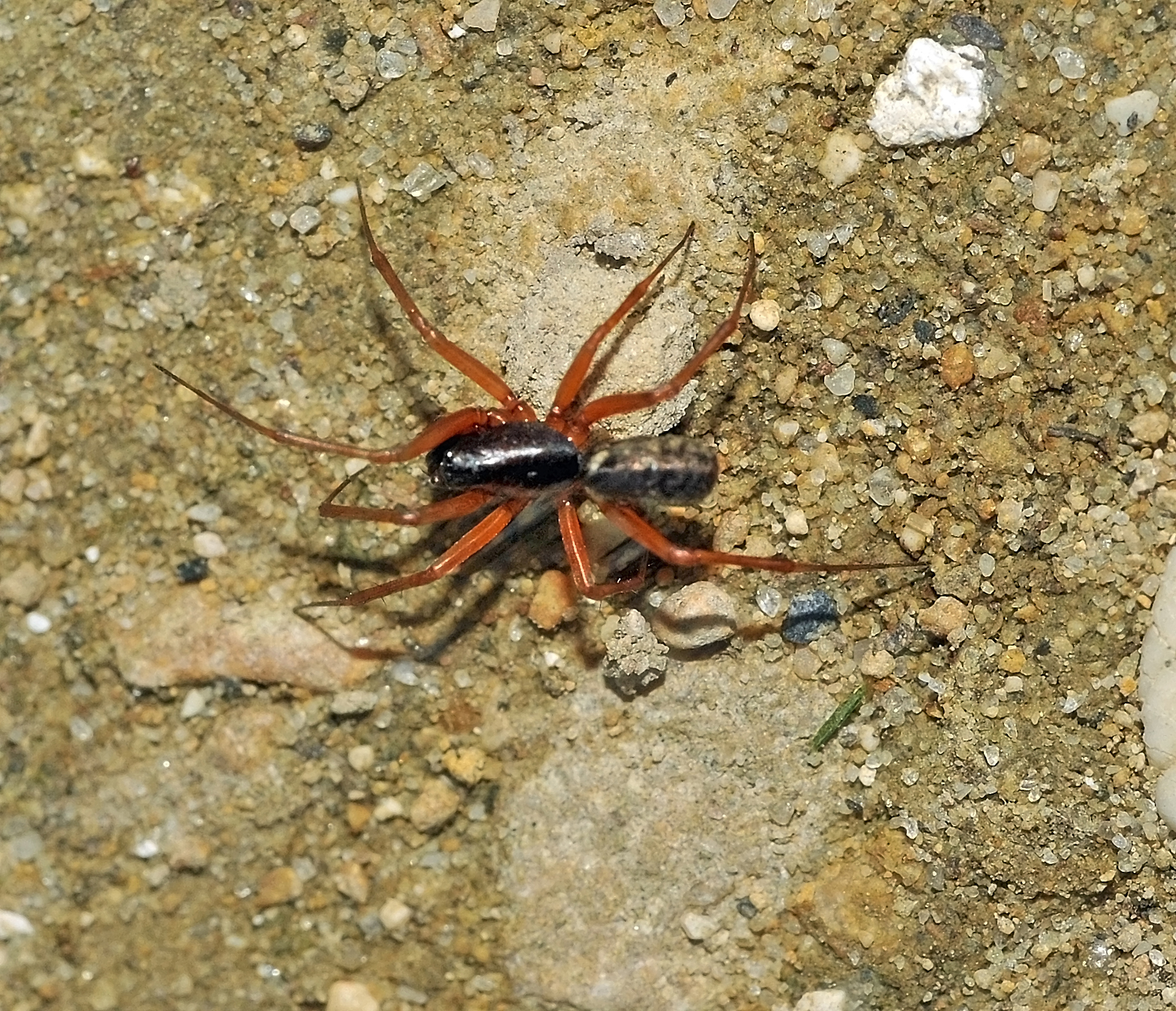
