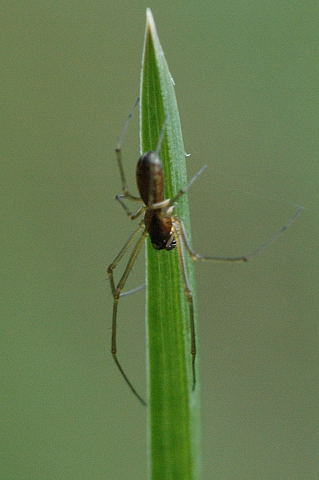
- Neriene clathrata
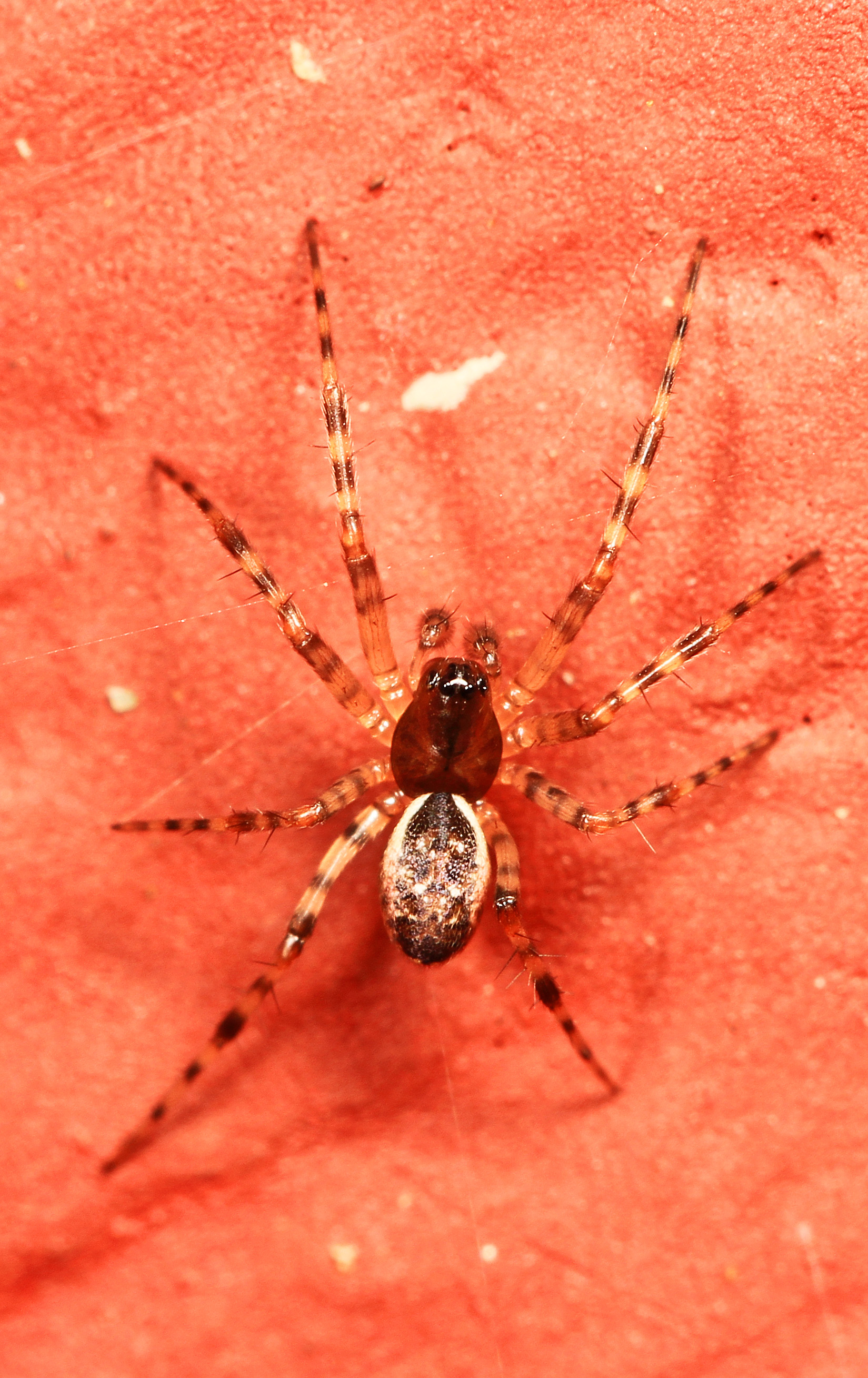
- Neriene digna

Scientific classification
- Kingdom: Animalia
- Phylum: Arthropoda
- Subphylum: Chelicerata
- Class: Arachnida
- Order: Araneae
- Infraorder: Araneomorphae
- Family: Linyphiidae
- Genus: Neriene; Blackwall, 1833

Type species
- N. clathrata (Sundevall, 1830)

Species
- 62, see text

Synonyms
- Ambengana Millidge & Russell-Smith, 1992; Neolinyphia Oi, 1960; Prolinyphia Homann, 1952

= Neriene =

Genus of spiders

Neriene is a genus of sheet weavers that was first described by John Blackwall in 1833.

Its species are found in Africa, Asia, Europe, North America, and on Greenland.

== Species ==
As of October 2025, this genus includes 62 species:

- Neriene albolimbata (Karsch, 1879) – Russia (Far East), China, Korea, Taiwan, Japan
- Neriene amiculata (Simon, 1905) – Indonesia (Java)
- Neriene angulifera (Schenkel, 1953) – Russia (Far East), China, Japan
- Neriene aquilirostralis Chen & Zhu, 1989 – China, Korea
- Neriene baywanga (Barrion & Litsinger, 1995) – Philippines
- Neriene beccarii (Thorell, 1890) – Indonesia (Sumatra)
- Neriene birmanica (Thorell, 1887) – India, Myanmar, Laos, China, Indonesia (Bali)
- Neriene bovista Lee, Yoo & Kim, 2022 – Korea
- Neriene brongersmai van Helsdingen, 1969 – Japan
- Neriene calozonata Chen & Zhu, 1989 – China
- Neriene cavaleriei (Schenkel, 1963) – China, Vietnam
- Neriene chunan Yin, 2012 – China
- Neriene circifolia Zhao & Li, 2014 – China
- Neriene clathrata (Sundevall, 1830) – North America, Europe, North Africa, Turkey, Caucasus, Russia (Europe to Far East), Iran, Central Asia, China, Korea, Japan (type species)
- Neriene clivosa Tanasevitch, 2023 – Vietnam
- Neriene comoroensis Locket, 1980 – Comoros
- Neriene compta Zhu & Sha, 1986 – China
- Neriene conica (Locket, 1968) – Angola, Rwanda, Kenya
- Neriene coosa (Gertsch, 1951) – Russia (Sakhalin), United States
- Neriene decormaculata Chen & Zhu, 1988 – China
- Neriene digna (Keyserling, 1886) – Alaska, Canada, United States
- Neriene emphana (Walckenaer, 1841) – Europe, Caucasus, Russia (Europe to Far East), Kazakhstan, Iran, Central Asia, China, Korea, Japan
- Neriene flammea van Helsdingen, 1969 – South Africa
- Neriene furtiva (O. Pickard-Cambridge, 1871) – Europe, North Africa, Turkey, Georgia, Russia (Europe to South Siberia)
- Neriene fusca (Oi, 1960) – Japan
- Neriene guanga (Barrion & Litsinger, 1995) – Philippines
- Neriene gyirongana Hu, 2001 – China
- Neriene hammeni (van Helsdingen, 1963) – Netherlands, Belgium, France, Germany, China?
- Neriene helsdingeni (Locket, 1968) – Africa
- Neriene herbosa (Oi, 1960) – China, Japan
- Neriene japonica (Oi, 1960) – Russia (Far East), China, Korea, Japan
- Neriene jinjooensis Paik, 1991 – Russia (South Siberia), China, Korea, Japan
- Neriene kartala Jocqué, 1985 – Comoros
- Neriene katyae van Helsdingen, 1969 – Sri Lanka
- Neriene kibonotensis (Tullgren, 1910) – West, Central, East Africa
- Neriene kimyongkii (Paik, 1965) – Korea
- Neriene limbatinella (Bösenberg & Strand, 1906) – Russia (Far East), China, Korea, Japan
- Neriene litigiosa (Keyserling, 1886) – North America. Introduced to China
- Neriene longipedella (Bösenberg & Strand, 1906) – Russia (Far East), China, Korea, Japan
- Neriene lushanensis Li, Liu & Chen, 2018 – China
- Neriene macella (Thorell, 1898) – India, China, Myanmar, Thailand, Laos, Vietnam, Malaysia (peninsula, Borneo), Indonesia (Sumatra, Java), Philippines
- Neriene marginella (Oi, 1960) – Japan
- Neriene montana (Clerck, 1757) – Europe, Caucasus, Russia (Europe to Far East), Central Asia, Japan. Introduced to Canada
- Neriene natalensis van Helsdingen, 1969 – South Africa
- Neriene nitens Zhu & Chen, 1991 – China
- Neriene obtusa (Locket, 1968) – Africa
- Neriene obtusoides Bosmans & Jocqué, 1983 – Cameroon
- Neriene oidedicata van Helsdingen, 1969 – Nepal, China, Russia (Far East), Korea, Japan
- Neriene orthocera Li, Liu & Chen, 2018 – China
- Neriene oxycera Tu & Li, 2006 – Laos, Thailand, Vietnam
- Neriene peltata (Wider, 1834) – Greenland, Europe, Caucasus, Russia (Europe to South Siberia), Iran
- Neriene poculiforma Liu & Chen, 2010 – China
- Neriene radiata (Walckenaer, 1841) – North America, Europe, Turkey, Caucasus, Russia (Europe to Far East), Kazakhstan, China, Korea, Japan
- Neriene redacta Chamberlin, 1925 – United States, Brazil, Uruguay
- Neriene strandia (Blauvelt, 1936) – China, Laos, Malaysia (Borneo)
- Neriene subarctica Marusik, 1991 – Russia (Middle Siberia to Far East)
- Neriene sundaica (Simon, 1905) – Indonesia (Java, Lombok)
- Neriene tiniktirika (Barrion & Litsinger, 1995) – Philippines
- Neriene variabilis (Banks, 1892) – Canada, United States
- Neriene yani Chen & Yin, 1999 – China
- Neriene zanhuangica Zhu & Tu, 1986 – China
- Neriene zhui Chen & Li, 1995 – China (Hainan)

== See also ==
- Frontinella
