= Neriene katyae =

Scientific classification
- Kingdom: Animalia
- Phylum: Arthropoda
- Subphylum: Chelicerata
- Class: Arachnida
- Order: Araneae
- Infraorder: Araneomorphae
- Family: Linyphiidae
- Genus: Neriene
- Species: N. katyae

Binomial name
- Neriene katyae van Helsdingen, 1969

Species of spider

Neriene katyae is a species of spider of the genus Neriene. It is endemic to Sri Lanka.
