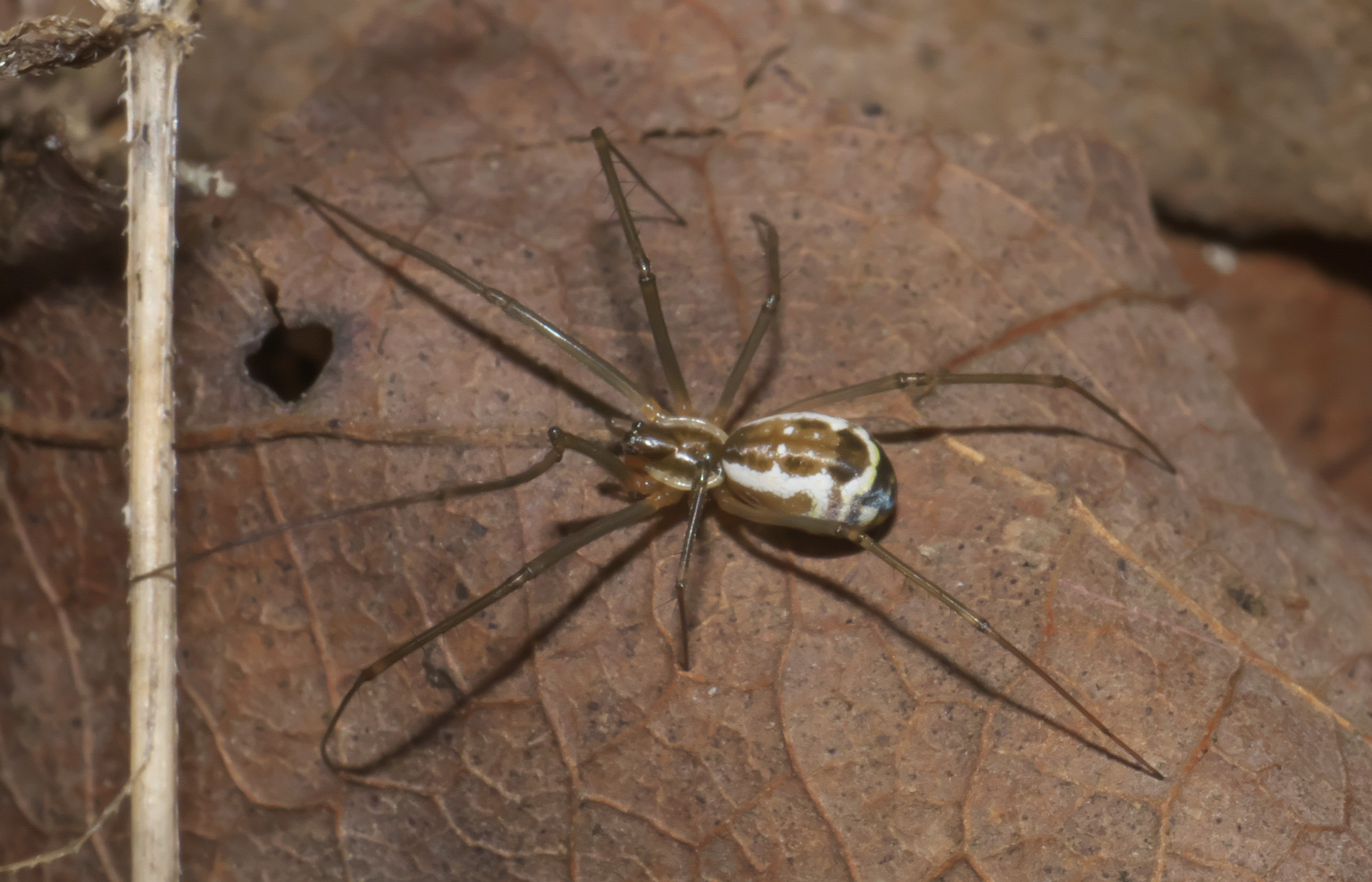

Scientific classification
- Domain: Eukaryota
- Kingdom: Animalia
- Phylum: Arthropoda
- Subphylum: Chelicerata
- Class: Arachnida
- Order: Araneae
- Infraorder: Araneomorphae
- Family: Linyphiidae
- Genus: Neriene
- Species: N. radiata

Binomial name
- Neriene radiata (Walckenaer, 1842)

= Filmy dome spider =

Species of spider

The filmy dome spider (Neriene radiata) is a sheet weaver: a spider in the family Linyphiidae with a holarctic distribution. These spiders construct a dome of fine spider silk and hang upside-down under it, waiting for their prey. It is a preferential host for the kleptoparasitic Argyrodes trigonum.

Neriene radiata, mating behaviour

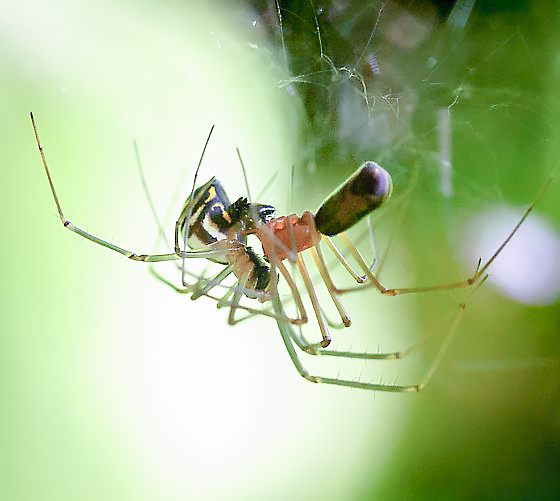
Male and female filmy dome spiders (Neriene radiata) mating
