= Frontinella laeta =

Scientific classification
- Domain: Eukaryota
- Kingdom: Animalia
- Phylum: Arthropoda
- Subphylum: Chelicerata
- Class: Arachnida
- Order: Araneae
- Infraorder: Araneomorphae
- Family: Linyphiidae
- Genus: Frontinella
- Species: F. laeta

Binomial name
- Frontinella laeta (O. P.-Cambridge, 1898)

Species of spider

Frontinella laeta is a sheet weaver species found in Mexico. It was first described by Octavius Pickard-Cambridge in 1898.
