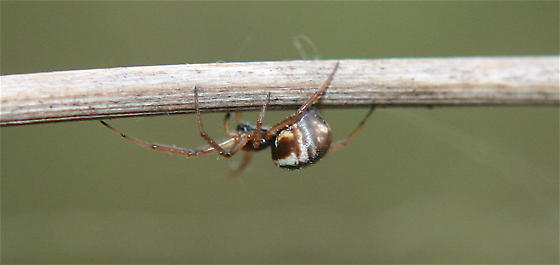
- Female
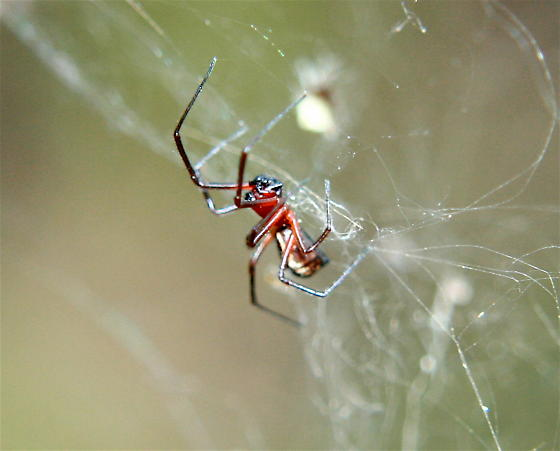
- Male

Scientific classification
- Kingdom: Animalia
- Phylum: Arthropoda
- Subphylum: Chelicerata
- Class: Arachnida
- Order: Araneae
- Infraorder: Araneomorphae
- Family: Linyphiidae
- Genus: Frontinella
- Species: F. pyramitela

Binomial name
- Frontinella pyramitela (Walckenaer, 1841)

Synonyms
- Linyphia pyramitela Walckenaer, 1841; Linyphia communis Hentz, 1850; Frontinella communis (Hentz, 1850)

= Bowl and doily spider =

Species of spider

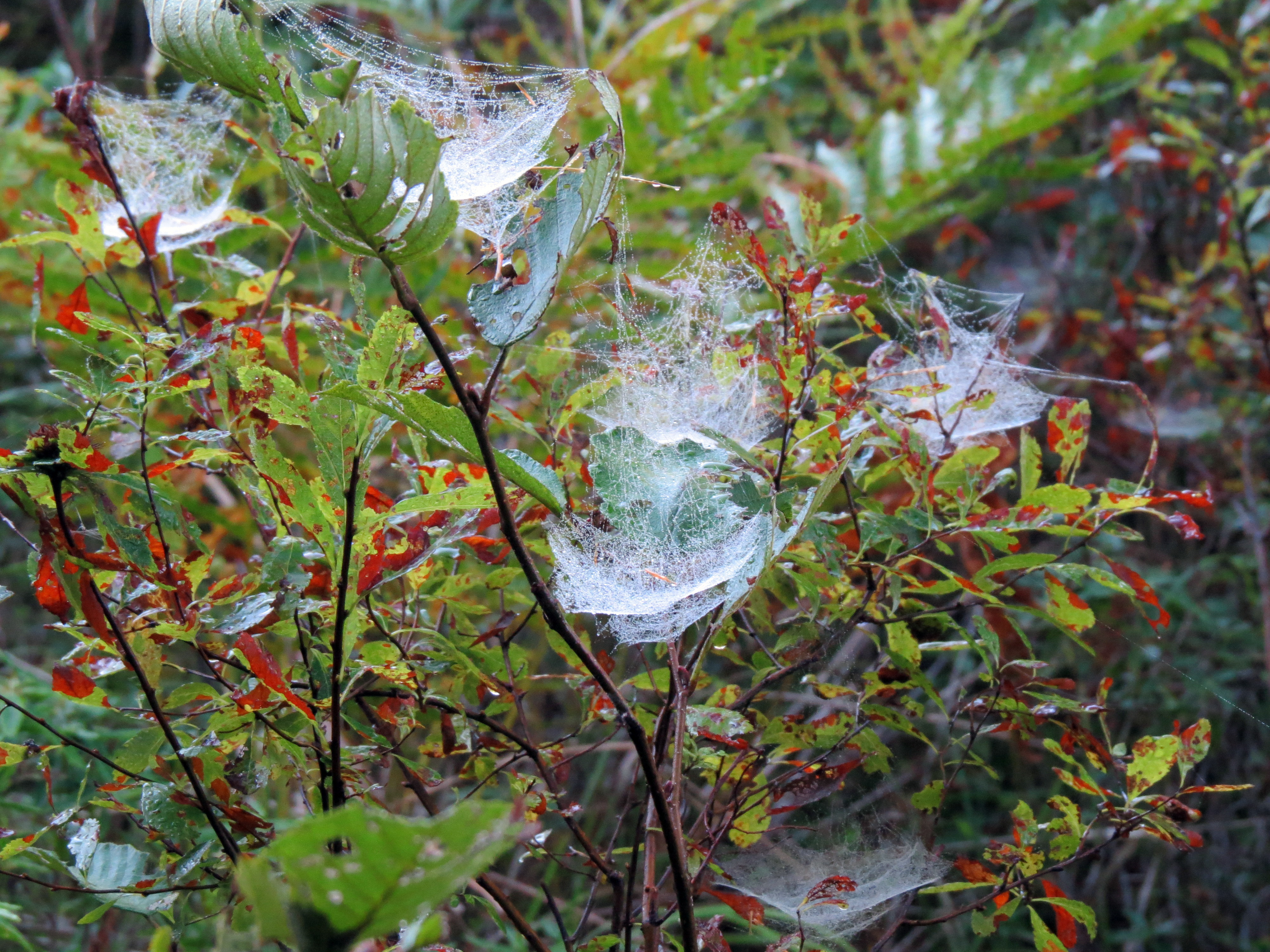
Several bowl and doily spider's webs wet with dew, on a trail in the Adirondacks, between Long Pond and Bessie Pond, St. Regis Canoe Area

The bowl and doily spider (Frontinella pyramitela) is a species of sheet weaver found in North and Central America. It is a small spider, about 4 mm (0.16 in) long, that weaves a fairly complex and unique sheet web system consisting of an inverted dome shaped web, or "bowl," suspended above a horizontal sheet web, or "doily", hence its common name. The spider hangs from the underside of the "bowl", and bites through the web small flies, gnats and other small insects that fall down into the non-sticky webbing. The webs are commonly seen in weedy fields and in shrubs, and may often contain both a male and a female spider in late summer—like many linyphiids, Frontinella males and females may cohabitate for some time. Males exhibit competition for female mates both by fighting and sperm competition. Uniquely, these spiders exhibit behavioral thermoregulation and have lengthened circadian rhythms.

== Taxonomy ==
Frontinella pyramitela was first described by Charles Walckenaer in 1841. In 1850, Nicholas Hentz described a spider which he named Linyphia communis. Both were later regarded as the same species, with Frontinella communis being a junior synonym.

== Description ==
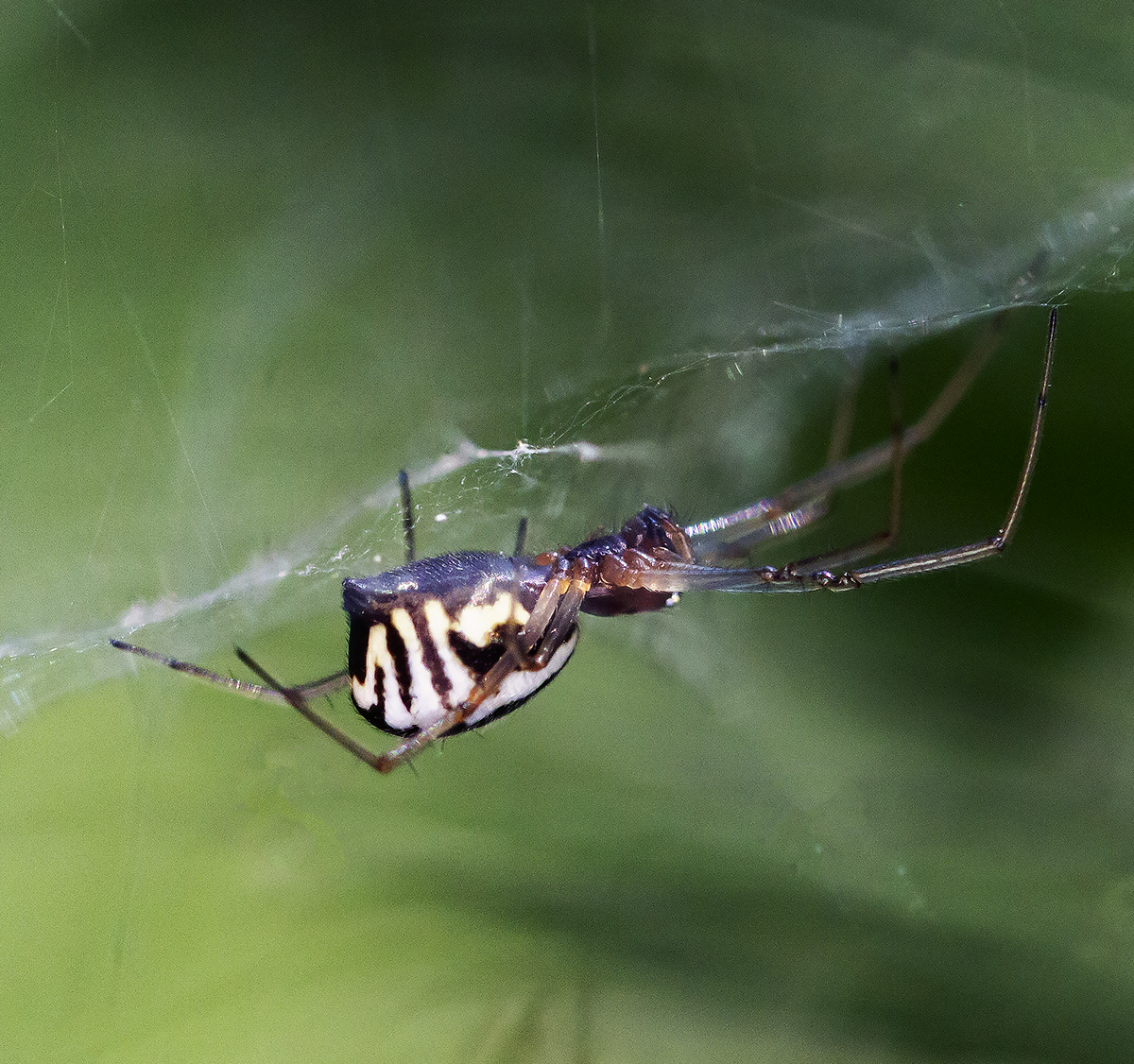
Female in web

F. pyramitela are small (4 mm, or 0.15 in) and are typically a reddish-brown color, with more yellowish colored legs. Their abdomen displays decorative white dots along the sides and has short hairs.

== Habitat and distribution ==
These spiders are found in a large variety of habitats and climates. Some of their more common habitat sites include temperate woods and alpine forests, though they can also be found in more tropical, humid areas. They are most commonly found in North America, often in the United States.

The spiders are most active from May through June, and then again in September.

== Diet ==
=== Typical prey and prey capture ===
The spiders typically eat small insects, such as gnats or small flies that fall down into its web. Once the prey falls into the web, the spider will bite the prey and inject its venom into it in order to immobilize the prey. The spider then pulls the prey into the "bowl" of its web and may consume it.

=== Prey memory ===
Frontinella pyramitela is likely able to retain a memory of their past prey. After prey are removed from their nests, the spiders typically search for the lost prey, with more effort being exerted if the prey was larger. The spiders are able to distinguish between the lost prey that they are looking for and other old prey remnants. Thus, it has been suggested that F. pyramitela are able to remember previous information about prey, including size and quality.

== Webs ==
=== Web design ===
The spiders' webs have an unusual design. The spiders weave a fairly complex sheet web system consisting of an inverted dome-shaped web, or "bowl," suspended above a horizontal sheet web, or "doily." The spider hangs from the underside of the "bowl," and bites through the web prey that falls down into the non-sticky webbing. This web design allows the spider to survey its prey below the web while remaining above in a protected location. The webs are commonly seen in weedy fields and in shrubs.

=== Cohabitation ===
The majority of spider species are solitary; it is, therefore, unique that F. pyramitela exhibit cohabitation between males and females. In these spiders, males rarely build webs and thus rely upon female snares for fodder. Male spiders typically stay at a female's nest for much longer than the time necessary for copulation. The time that males eventually do leave the female's nest is randomly determined and not linked to specific events. Female identity and recent prey capture by the male may influence the length of time the male stays with the female.

== Reproduction and life cycle ==
=== Determinants of female fecundity ===
The major determinants of Frontinella pyramitela fecundity in females are female longevity, foraging success, and size. After each clutch of eggs is birthed, resulting fecundity in the mother decreases, most significantly after the second clutch is delivered. Early mortality significantly affects the spider's lifetime fecundity.

=== Life extension by dietary restriction ===
Female F. pyramitela spiders tend to live longer lives when they have a more restricted food diet. Despite this, when the spiders have more restricted diets, they also have decreased overall fecundity and delay their egg laying.

== Mating ==
=== Courtship practices ===
The courtship practices of this spider are known to be both lengthy and elaborate and can be divided into the pre-mount and the mount phases. When the male first arrives on the female's web, she often exhibits predatory behavior which ends upon the initiation of courtship by the male. Many behaviors in the courtship between males and females produce web-borne vibrations that in turn effect the movement and behavior of the recipient. It is suggested that these unique courtship behaviors function to help spiders of the F. pyramitela species to recognize one another, suppress female aggression, and facilitate the stimulation and synchronization of mating.

=== Pre-copulation ===
Before copulating and building a sperm nest, male spiders will assess a female's virginity. If the male determines that the female is a virgin, he will then fill his pedipalps with sperm and begin insemination. The male assesses a female's virginity by a signal given by the female. Females can only send the signal if they are virgins. There is no signal for a spider that has already copulated.

=== Copulation ===
Typically, the male is the one who terminates copulation; females rarely end copulation mid-way through the event. Due to this, females are usually receptive to mating for their entire adult lives. The exception to this rule is when they are about to deposit an egg sac. They tend to copulate for significantly longer than the required fifteen minutes. One explanation of the purpose of this lengthened copulation time is that longer copulations result in larger hatchlings.

=== Pheromones ===
Male courtship of females has been linked to chemical pheromone release. This pheromone is specific to the Frontinella pyramitela species, distinct from other similar spiders' pheromones. The pheromones are released by mature females only. These pheromones have the dual functions of both letting males know that the female spider is ready to mate, as well as making the female appear more attractive to the male. It is the pheromone itself that attracts the male, not the actual physical presence of the female spider.

=== Male competition over mates ===
Male spiders are known to fight over access to potential female mates. The longer that these fights between males go on, the higher the risk that the males will injure, or even kill one another. When the value of a female is considered equal to two males (determined by war of attrition game theory), the male with the larger body size tends to win. The most common incidents of injury amongst males were found in smaller body sized males who were defending a female that he valued greatly.

=== Sperm competition ===
Sperm competition, which is a post-copulatory occurrence, occurs in F. pyramitela. Because females can mate with multiple males, male competition for female mates occurs even after the physical mating is done, as the sperms must then compete for fertilization inside the female reproductive tract. The male who mates first with the female has a much higher chance of giving the sperm which will get fertilized. The male who mates second may have a small chance of fertilizing a few eggs within the clutch. F. pyramitela thus exhibit first male sperm priority.

== Enemies ==
When forced to share a habitat with the nonnative European spider species Linyphia triangularis, Frontinella pyramitela were found to abandon their nests and decrease their nest building in areas where L. triangularis was present. L. triangularis sometimes took over F. pyramitela's web materials, web site, or even the web itself, but F. pyramitela's never did the same to L. triangularis.

== Physiology ==
=== Behavioral thermoregulation ===
Frontinella pyramitela regulates its behavior based on the positioning of the sun. On days when insolation and ambient temperatures are high, the spiders will align themselves with sun rays. The spider is able to change its body temperature by .5 degrees Celsius by aligning itself with sun rays when compared to when its body is perpendicular to sun rays. It is not likely that this behavior functions to help the spider regulate its body temperature. Instead, the proposed function of this behavior is to depress the spider's metabolic rate so that the body knows to move nutrients from maintenance use to reproductive use.

=== Circadian rhythm ===
This spider has been found to deviate from the traditional 24 hour circadian rhythm, opposing the circadian resonance hypothesis. Frontinella pyramitela runs on a 28.2-hour clock, with high variability in clock length, ranging from 24 hours to 33 hours. The spiders' clock time helps determine their behavior at different hours of the day and varies throughout different seasons of the year. The significance of this long clock length is still under investigation.

== Interactions with humans ==
When exposed to a sublethal dose of the neurotoxic pesticide malathion, the normal diet periodicities, time budgets, and patterns of locomotion all shifted in Frontinella pyramitela. This is likely due to malathion's action as an acetylcholinesterase inhibitor. Malathion has been shown to likely reduce the species' efficiency as agents of biological control.
