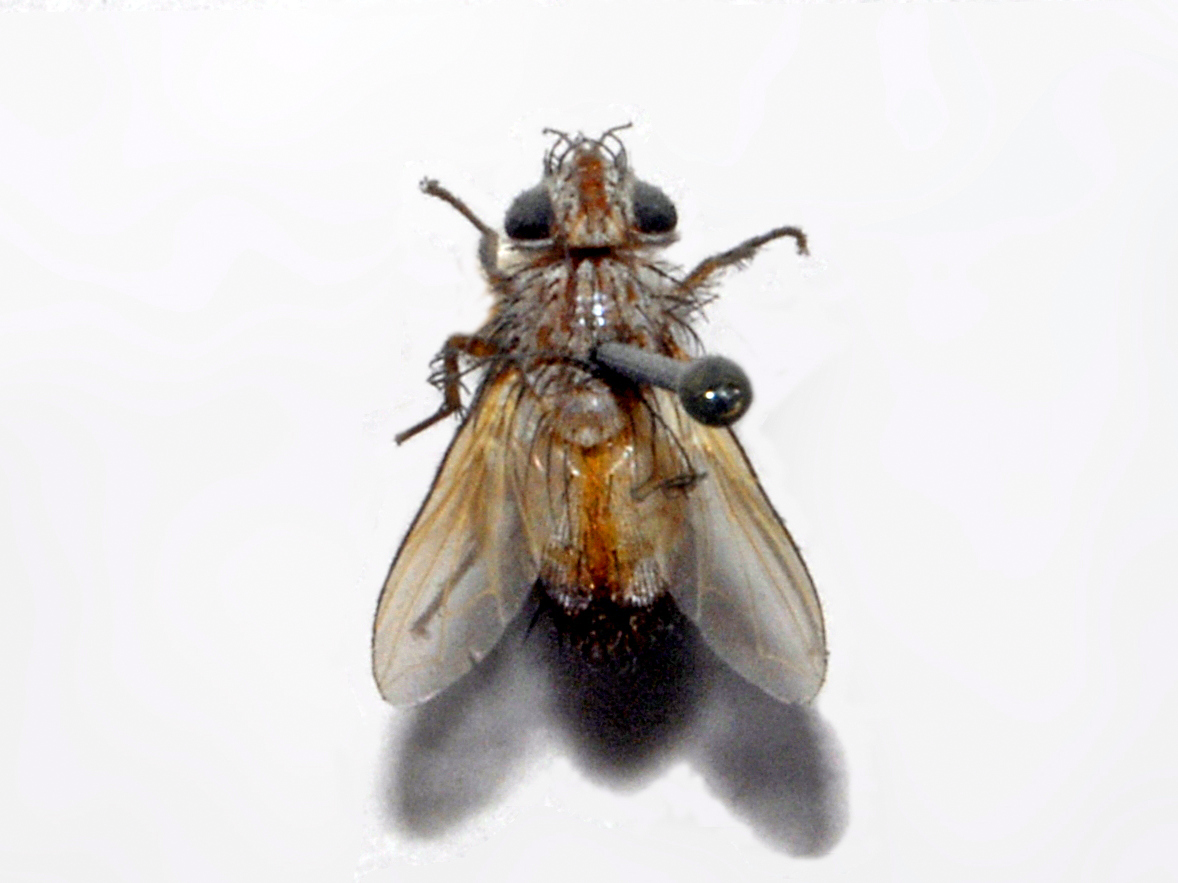
- Frontina laeta. Museum specimen

Scientific classification
- Kingdom: Animalia
- Phylum: Arthropoda
- Class: Insecta
- Order: Diptera
- Family: Tachinidae
- Subfamily: Exoristinae
- Tribe: Goniini
- Genus: Frontina
- Species: F. laeta

Binomial name
- Frontina laeta (Meigen, 1824)

Synonyms
- Tachina laeta Meigen, 1824; Latreillia testacea Robineau-Desvoidy, 1830; Tachina auronitens Hartig, 1838; Tachina laetabilis Zetterstedt, 1844

= Frontina laeta =

Species of fly

Frontina laeta is a species of fly in the family Tachinidae. Known hosts include Smerinthus ocellatus and Sphinx ligustri.

== Distribution ==
British Isles, Czech Republic, Estonia, Hungary, Latvia, Moldova, Poland, Slovakia, Ukraine, Denmark, Finland, Norway, Sweden, Corsica, Croatia, Italy, Portugal, Slovenia, Spain, Austria, Belgium, France, Germany, Netherlands, Switzerland, Japan, Kazakhstan, South Korea, Russia, Transcaucasia, China.
