= John Blackwall =

English naturalist (1790-1881)

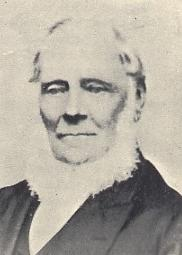
- Born: 20 January 1790; Manchester
- Died: 11 May 1881 (aged 91)
- Known for: A History of the Spiders of Great Britain and Ireland
- Scientific career
- Fields: Natural history
- Author abbrev. (zoology): Blackwall

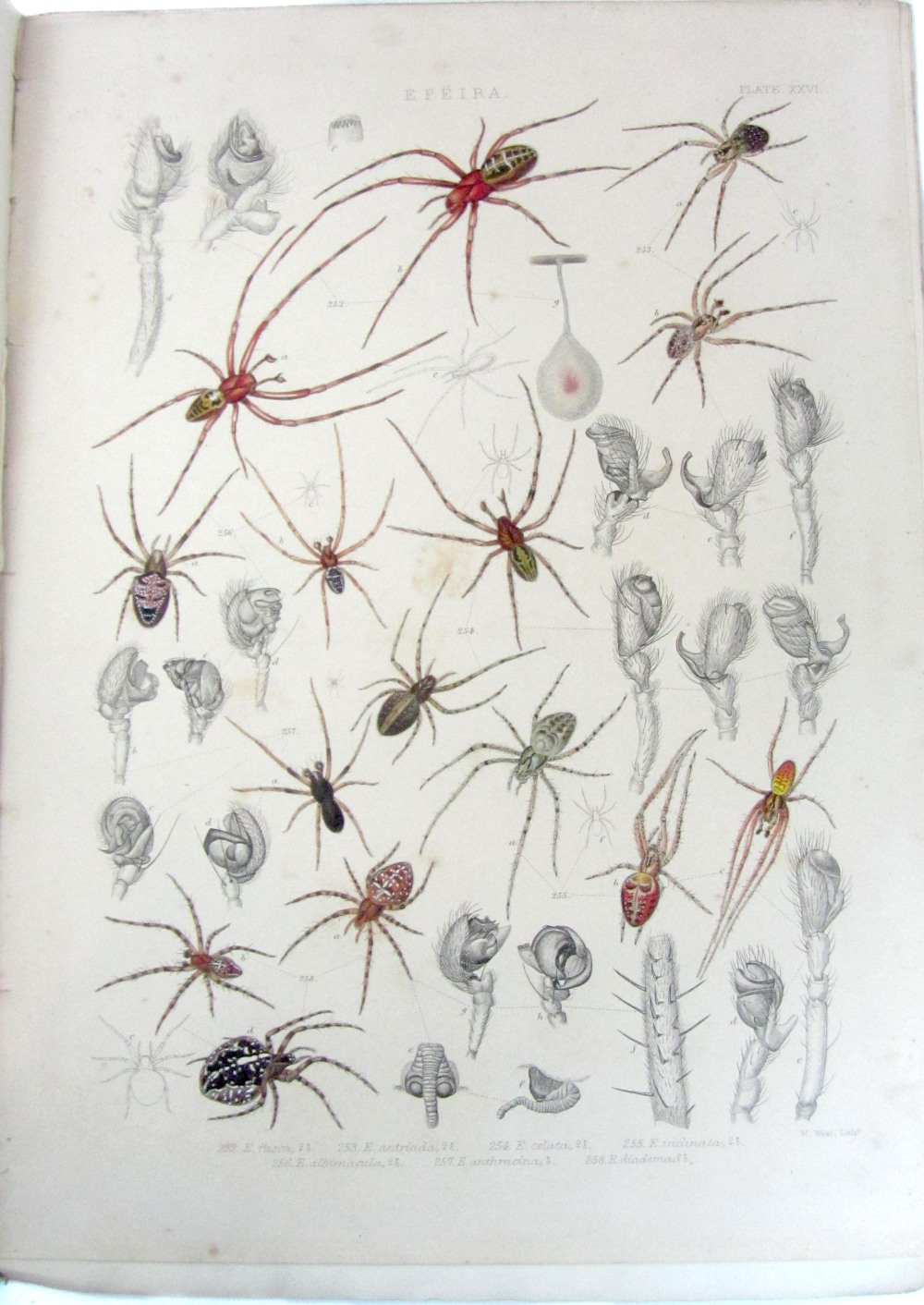
Plate from A History of the Spiders of Great Britain and Ireland

John Blackwall (20 January 1790 – 11 May 1881) was an English naturalist with a particular interest in spiders.

== Life ==
Blackwall was born in Manchester on 20 January 1790. He lived at Hendre House near Llanrwst in north Wales from 1833 until his death. He was interested in nature from an early age, first in birds and then spiders, on which he published his first article in 1827.

He published A History of the Spiders of Great Britain and Ireland (2 volumes, 1861–1864, Ray Society), which included accounts of 304 species and gave the first adequate descriptions of British spiders. Ten of the plates included were by Octavius Pickard-Cambridge and twelve were by the Irish naturalist Robert Templeton. He died 11 May 1881.

== Correspondence with Charles Darwin ==
Blackwall wrote four letters on the subject of spiders to Charles Darwin, dated 12 February 1868, 18 February 1868, 10 August 1869 and 8 September 1869. They survive in the Darwin Archive at Cambridge University Library. The first, second, and third letters are in direct response to communications from Darwin, though the whereabouts of these letters, presumably kept by Blackwall, are unknown. Their subject matter is, broadly, variation among spiders.

The first letter begins

I wish it were in my power to give satisfactory answers to the questions contained in your letter of the 10th instant. Adult spiders of the same species differ so remarkably in size and colour, and that independently to all appearance of the situations in which they are found, that I am unable to assign an adequate cause for this extraordinary fact...

== Legacy ==
Blackwall's work constituted a significant stage in the emergence of arachnology. He was one of the first to be interested in spiders of very small sizes, in particular those belonging to the genera Neriene and Walckenaeria.

A number of spider species are named after Blackwall, including Idiops blackwalli, Salticus blackwalli, Scotophaeus blackwalli, Theriodion blackwalli and the harvestman Leiobunum blackwalli.
