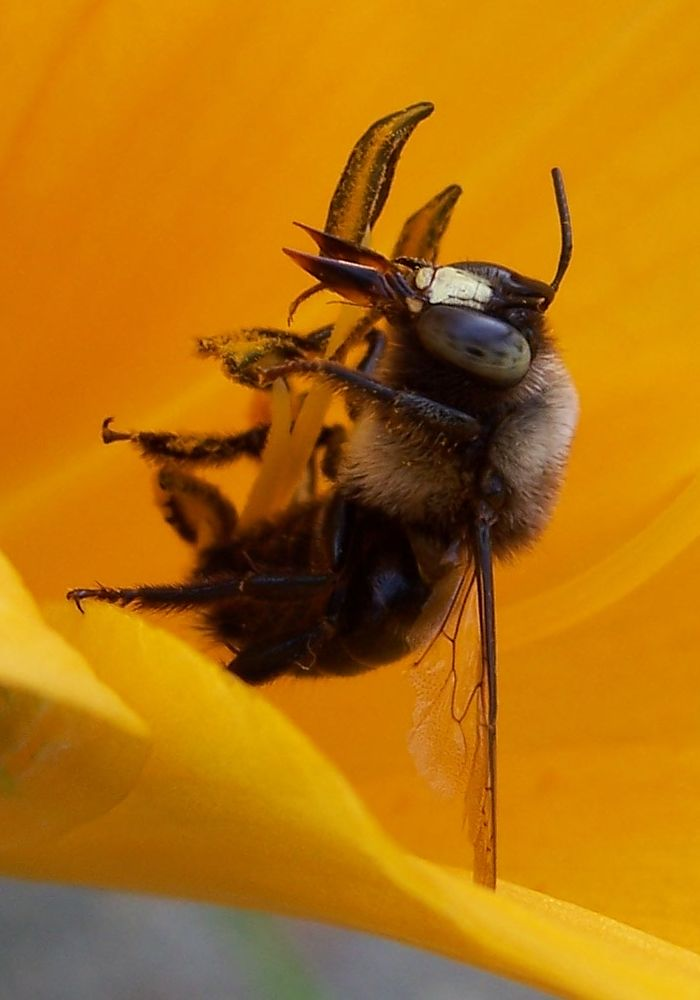

Scientific classification
- Kingdom: Animalia
- Phylum: Arthropoda
- Class: Insecta
- Order: Hymenoptera
- Family: Apidae
- Genus: Xylocopa
- Species: X. tabaniformis

Binomial name
- Xylocopa tabaniformis Smith, 1854

= Xylocopa tabaniformis =

Species of bee

Xylocopa tabaniformis, the horsefly-like carpenter bee or mountain carpenter bee is a species of carpenter bee in the family Apidae. It is found in Central America, North America, and South America. It is 12–18 millimetres (15/32–23/32 in) long and black. Males have yellow hair on the thorax.

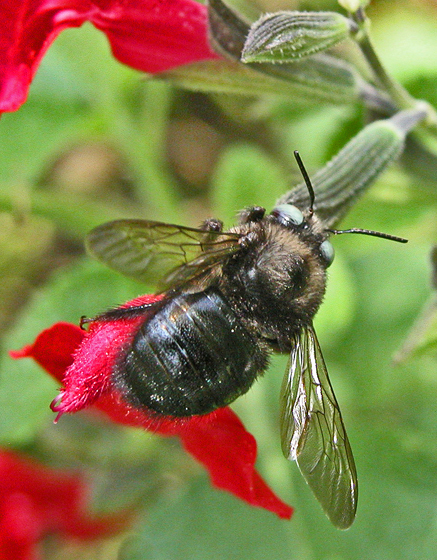
Horsefly-like carpenter bee, Xylocopa tabaniformis

A female mountain carpenter bee robbing nectar from pineapple sage salvia without providing pollination services. The last scene played at one-fourth speed.

Mountain carpenter bees on Lavandula. Including slow motion, to better show the bee and a white cabbage butterfly avoiding each other. Finally even slower speed closeup of the bee

Large eyed male mountain carpenter bee hovering

== Subspecies ==
These 10 subspecies belong to the species Xylocopa tabaniformis:

- Xylocopa tabaniformis androleuca Michener, 1940
- Xylocopa tabaniformis azteca Cresson, 1878
- Xylocopa tabaniformis illota Cockerell, 1919
- Xylocopa tabaniformis melanosoma O'Brien & Hurd, 1963
- Xylocopa tabaniformis melanura Cockerell, 1918
- Xylocopa tabaniformis orpifex Smith, 1874
- Xylocopa tabaniformis pallidiventris O'Brien & Hurd, 1965
- Xylocopa tabaniformis parkinsoniae Cockerell, 1917
- Xylocopa tabaniformis sylvicola O'Brien & Hurd, 1965
- Xylocopa tabaniformis tabaniformis Smith, 1854
