= Xylocopa nigrocaerulea =

Scientific classification
- Kingdom: Animalia
- Phylum: Arthropoda
- Class: Insecta
- Order: Hymenoptera
- Family: Apidae
- Genus: Xylocopa
- Species: X. nigrocaerulea

Binomial name
- Xylocopa nigrocaerulea Smith, 1874

Species of bee

Xylocopa nigrocaerulea, or Xylocopa (Biluna) nigrocaerulea, is a species of carpenter bee.
