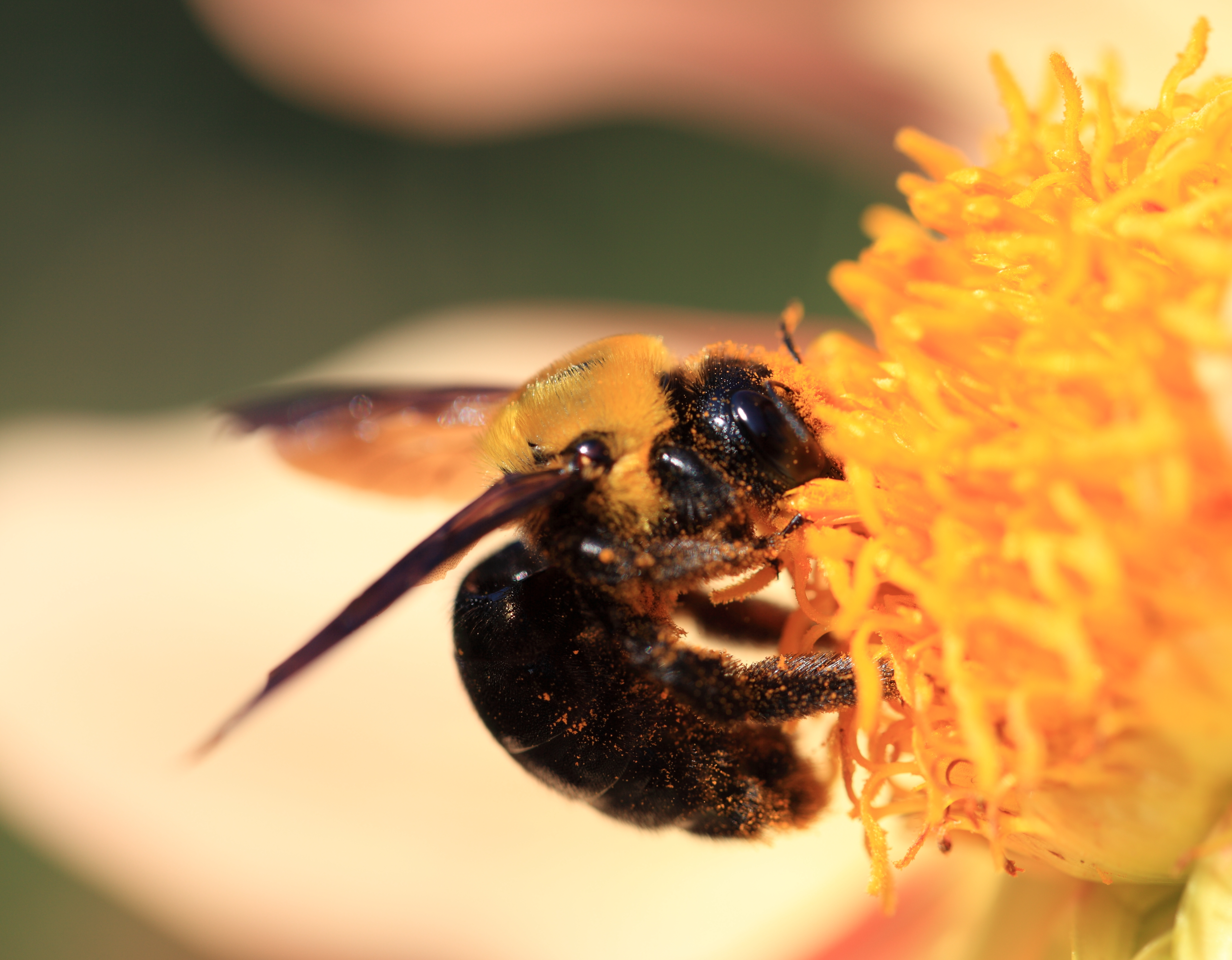

Scientific classification
- Domain: Eukaryota
- Kingdom: Animalia
- Phylum: Arthropoda
- Class: Insecta
- Order: Hymenoptera
- Family: Apidae
- Genus: Xylocopa
- Species: X. appendiculata

Binomial name
- Xylocopa appendiculata Smith, 1852

= Xylocopa appendiculata =

Species of bee

Xylocopa appendiculata is a species of carpenter bee in the family Apidae. It originates from eastern Asia and was first found in the United States in 2013.

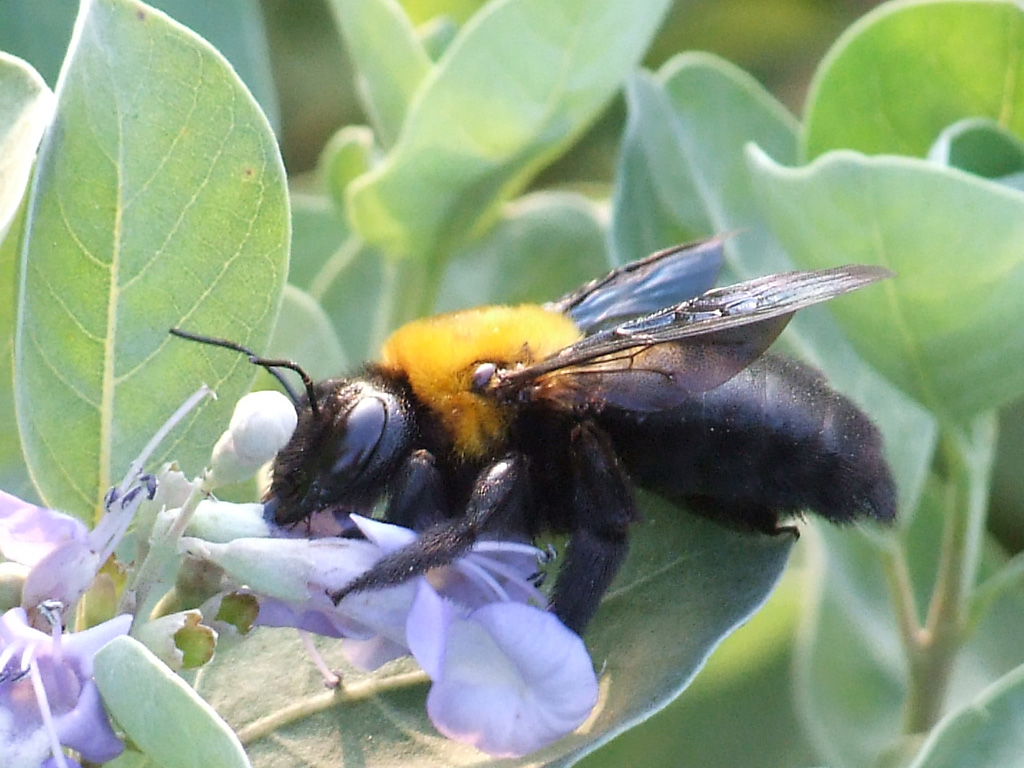

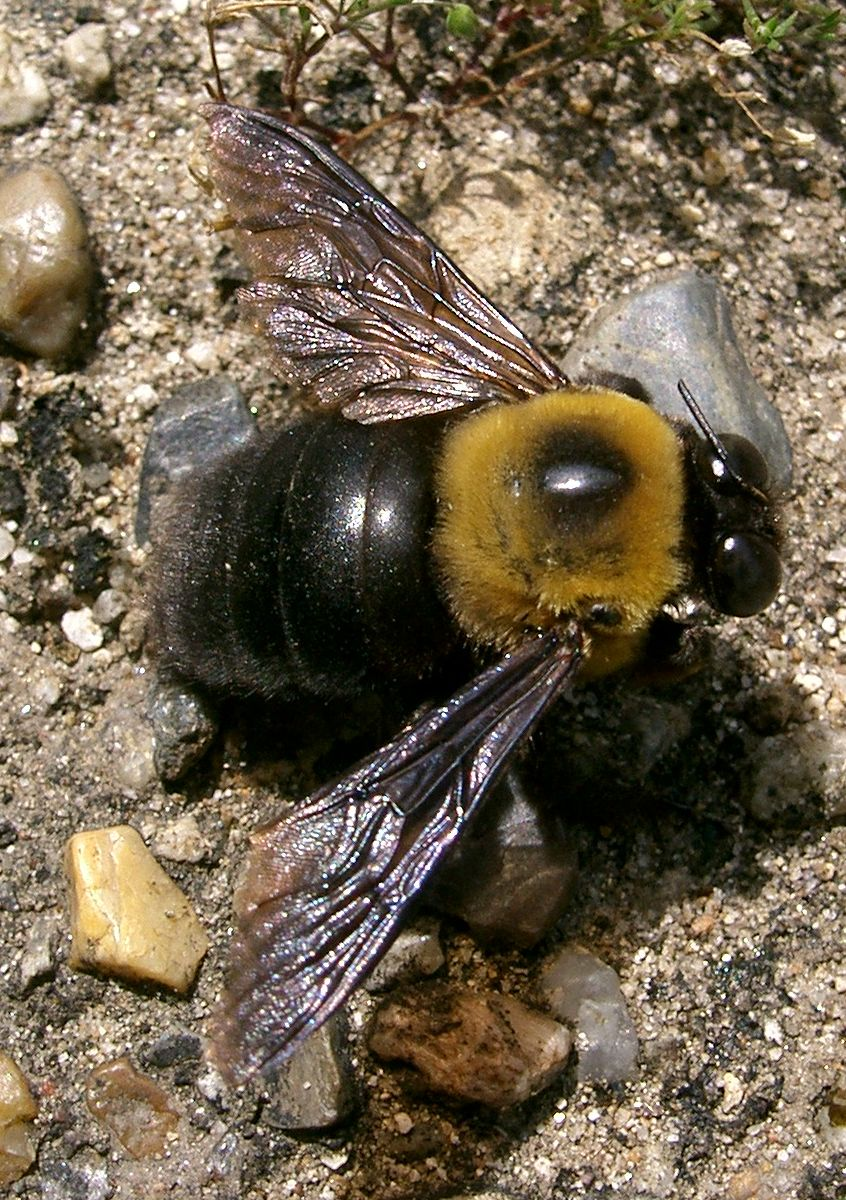
