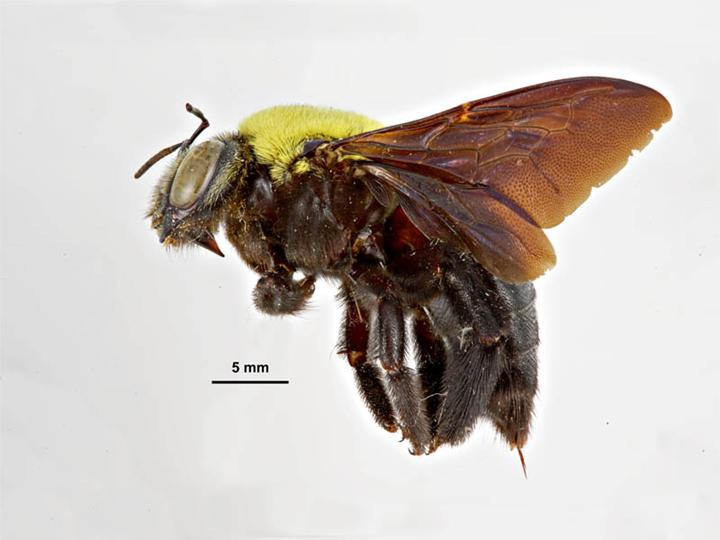
- Female

Scientific classification
- Kingdom: Animalia
- Phylum: Arthropoda
- Clade: Pancrustacea
- Class: Insecta
- Order: Hymenoptera
- Family: Apidae
- Genus: Xylocopa
- Species: X. waterhousei

Binomial name
- Xylocopa waterhousei Remko Leijs, 2000

= Xylocopa waterhousei =

Species of bee

Xylocopa waterhousei or Xylocopa (Koptortosoma) waterhousei is a species of carpenter bee. It is endemic to Australia. It was described in 2000 by Australian entomologist Remko Leijs.

== Description ==
Body length is 20–26 mm; wing length 17–21 mm. Body pubescence is bright yellow.

== Distribution and habitat ==
The species occurs in the Northern Territory in Arnhem Land and Kakadu National Park. The holotype was collected near Mudginberri homestead. Associated habitats include open monsoon forest and shrubland.

== Behaviour ==
The adults are flying mellivores. Flowering plants visited by the bees include Calytrix brachychaeta.

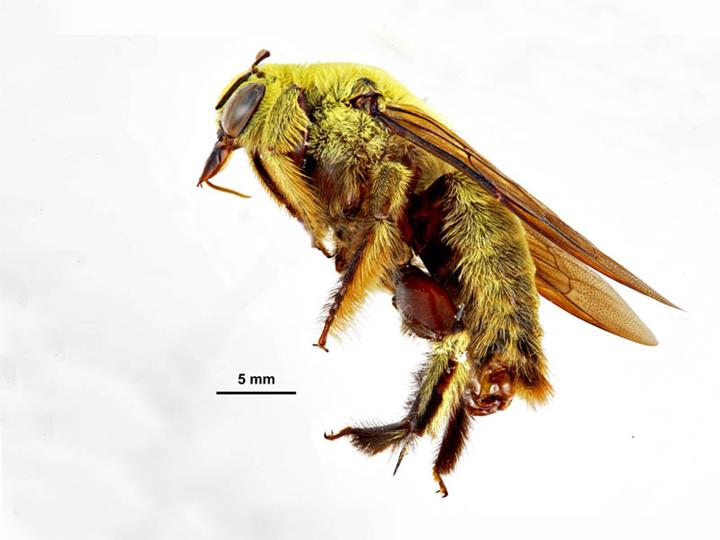
Male
