= Xylocopa auripennis =

Scientific classification
- Kingdom: Animalia
- Phylum: Arthropoda
- Class: Insecta
- Order: Hymenoptera
- Family: Apidae
- Genus: Xylocopa
- Species: X. auripennis

Binomial name
- Xylocopa auripennis Lepeletier, 1841

Synonyms
- Xylocopa hemichlora Cockerell, 1929; Xylocopa semipurpurea Cockerell, 1929; Xylocopa phenachroa Cockerell, 1929; Xylocopa pictipennis Smith, 1874

Species of bee

Xylocopa auripennis, or Xylocopa (Biluna) auripennis, is a species of carpenter bee. It is widely distributed in South Asian countries, and Southeast Asian countries.

== Subspecies ==
- Xylocopa (Biluna) auripennis iridipennis Lepeletier, 1841
- Xylocopa (Biluna) auripennis caspari van der Vecht, 1953
