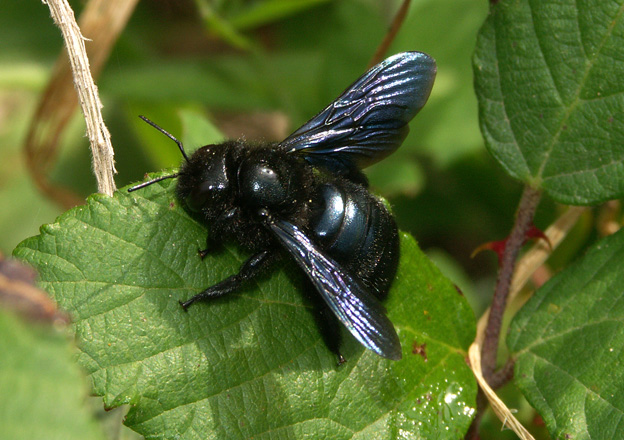

Scientific classification
- Domain: Eukaryota
- Kingdom: Animalia
- Phylum: Arthropoda
- Class: Insecta
- Order: Hymenoptera
- Family: Apidae
- Genus: Xylocopa
- Species: X. iris

Binomial name
- Xylocopa iris (Christ, 1791)

= Xylocopa iris =

Species of bee

The Xylocopa iris is a species of carpenter bee.

It is found in Southwestern Europe.
