= Xylocopa bryorum =

Scientific classification
- Kingdom: Animalia
- Phylum: Arthropoda
- Class: Insecta
- Order: Hymenoptera
- Family: Apidae
- Genus: Xylocopa
- Species: X. bryorum

Binomial name
- Xylocopa bryorum (Fabricius, 1775)

Synonyms
- Apis bryorum Fabricius, 1775; Xylocopa separata Pérez, 1901; Xylocopa (Koptorthosoma) separata Pérez, 1901; Xylocopa (Maiella) bryorum (Fabricius, 1775)

Species of bee

Xylocopa bryorum, or Xylocopa (Koptortosoma) bryorum, is a species of carpenter bee. It is distributed in Sri Lanka, Maldives, Bangladesh, Laos, Vietnam, Thailand.
