= Xylocopa fenestrata =

Scientific classification
- Kingdom: Animalia
- Phylum: Arthropoda
- Class: Insecta
- Order: Hymenoptera
- Family: Apidae
- Genus: Xylocopa
- Species: X. fenestrata

Binomial name
- Xylocopa fenestrata (Fabricius, 1798)

Synonyms
- Apis fenestrata Fabricius, 1798; Xylocopa lunata Klug, 1807; Xylocopa indica Klug, 1807; Xylocopa serripes Burmeister, 1876; Xylocopa gardineri Cameron, 1902; Xylocopa serripes_homonym Hedicke, 1938; Xylocopa hedickae Maa, 1940, replacement name; Xylocopa (Ctenoxylocopa) fenestrata mauritii Maa, 1970

Species of bee

Xylocopa fenestrata, or Xylocopa (Ctenoxylocopa) fenestrata, is a species of carpenter bee. It is widely distributed in Asian countries and very few African countries such as Madagascar, Seychelles and Réunion. It is considered as a pest of timber and bamboo, but is also a valuable pollinator.
