= Xylocopa amethystina =

Scientific classification
- Kingdom: Animalia
- Phylum: Arthropoda
- Class: Insecta
- Order: Hymenoptera
- Family: Apidae
- Genus: Xylocopa
- Species: X. amethystina

Binomial name
- Xylocopa amethystina (Fabricius, 1793)

Synonyms
- Apis amethystina Fabricius, 1793; Xylocopa ignita Smith 1874; Xylocopa amethystina sigiriana Cockerell, 1911

Species of bee

Xylocopa amethystina, or Xylocopa (Nodula) amethystina, is a species of carpenter bee. It is distributed in South Asian countries such as, India, Pakistan and Sri Lanka.

== Subspecies ==
- Xylocopa amethystina amethystina (Fabricius, 1793)
- Xylocopa amethystina phanerocephala Cockerell, 1920
