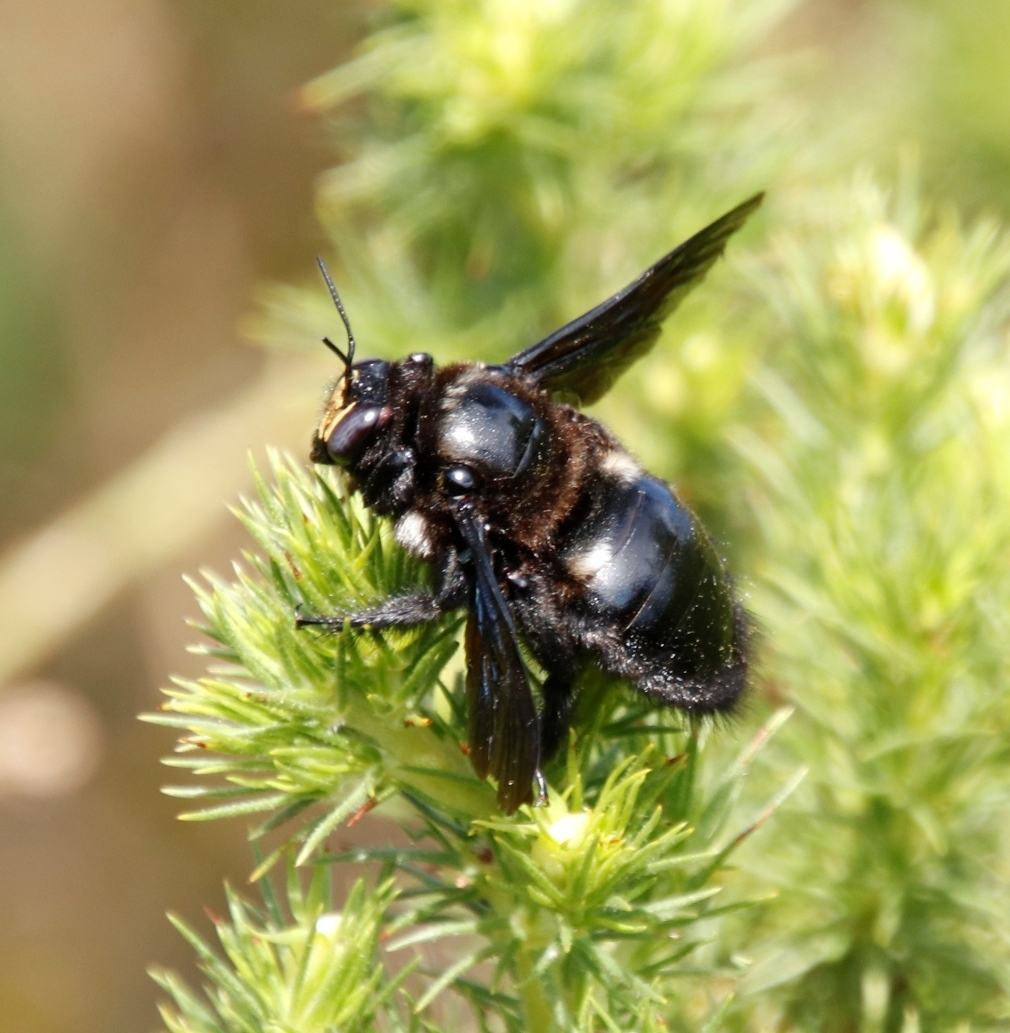
- Xylocopa capitata, South Africa

Scientific classification
- Kingdom: Animalia
- Phylum: Arthropoda
- Clade: Pancrustacea
- Class: Insecta
- Order: Hymenoptera
- Family: Apidae
- Subfamily: Xylocopinae
- Tribe: Xylocopini
- Genus: Xylocopa
- Species: X. capitata

Binomial name
- Xylocopa capitata Smith, 1854

Synonyms
- Xylocopa armata Taschenberg, 1879; Xylocopa capensis Lepeletier

= Xylocopa capitata =

Species of bees

Xylocopa capitata is a species of large carpenter bee in the family Apidae. It is found in Sub-Saharan Africa.

== Subspecies ==
These two subspecies belong to the species Xylocopa capitata:

- Xylocopa capitata capitata
- Xylocopa capitata khuzibiegensis Vicidomini
