= Xylocopa micheneri =

Scientific classification
- Domain: Eukaryota
- Kingdom: Animalia
- Phylum: Arthropoda
- Class: Insecta
- Order: Hymenoptera
- Family: Apidae
- Genus: Xylocopa
- Species: X. micheneri

Binomial name
- Xylocopa micheneri Hurd, 1978

Species of bee

Xylocopa micheneri is a species of carpenter bee in the family Apidae. It is found in Central America and North America.

== Subspecies ==
These two subspecies belong to the species Xylocopa micheneri:

- Xylocopa micheneri decipiens Hurd, 1978
- Xylocopa micheneri micheneri Hurd, 1978
