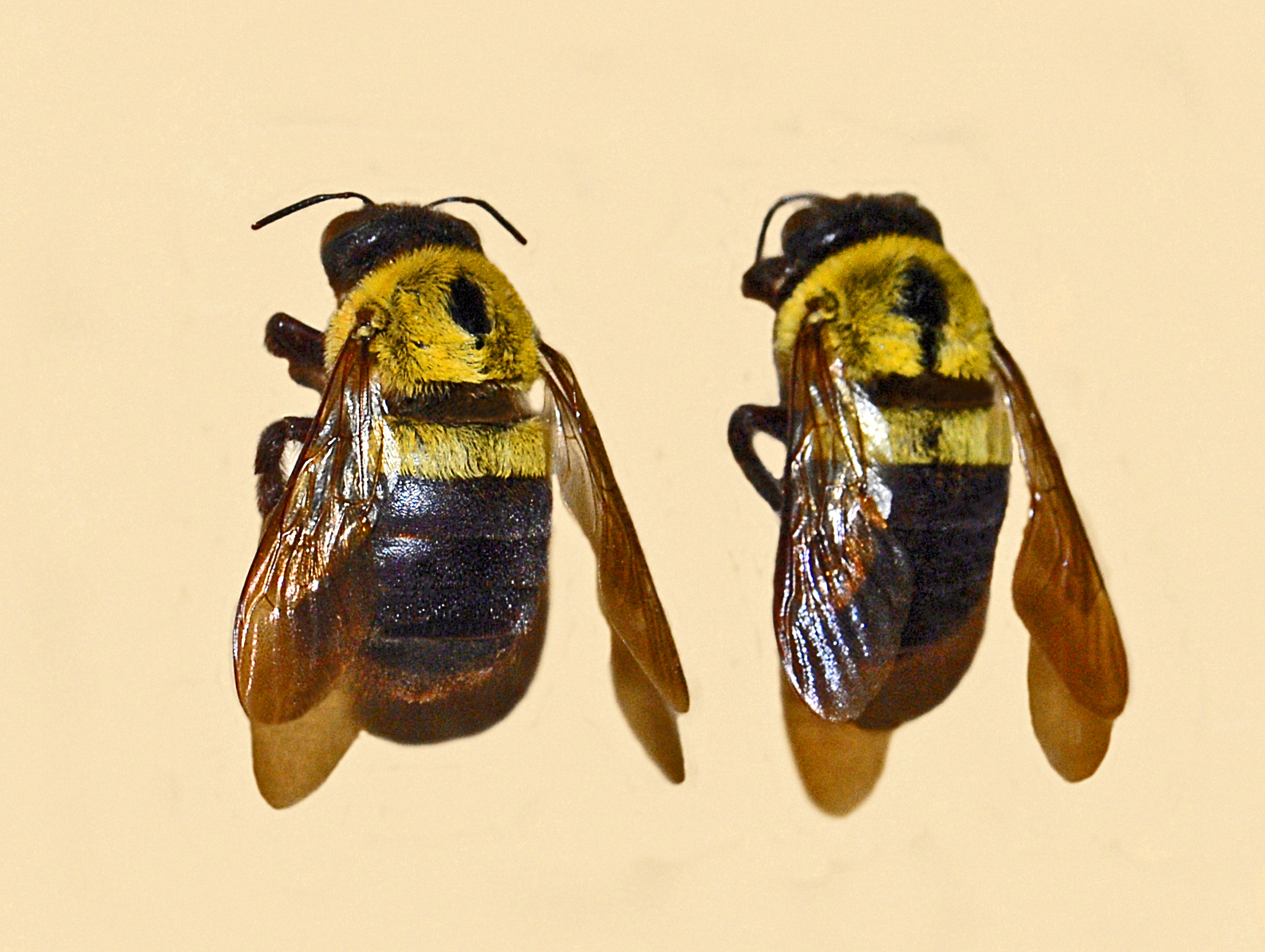
- Xylocopa olivacea from Guinea-Bissau

Scientific classification
- Kingdom: Animalia
- Phylum: Arthropoda
- Class: Insecta
- Order: Hymenoptera
- Family: Apidae
- Genus: Xylocopa
- Species: X. olivacea

Binomial name
- Xylocopa olivacea (Fabricius 1778)

Synonyms
- Xylocopa olivacea var. calens f. atripyga Strand 1911

= Xylocopa olivacea =

Species of bee

Xylocopa olivacea is a species of carpenter bee. It has a completely yellow thorax and a yellow band on the first tergite. This species is very similar to X. calens, endemic to Madagascar. X. calens just differs in the length of the hair on the metasoma.

This species can be found in Senegal, Sierra Leone, Togo, Nigeria, Cameroon, the Democratic Republic of the Congo, Ethiopia, Tanzania, Mozambique, Malawi, Angola, and South Africa.
