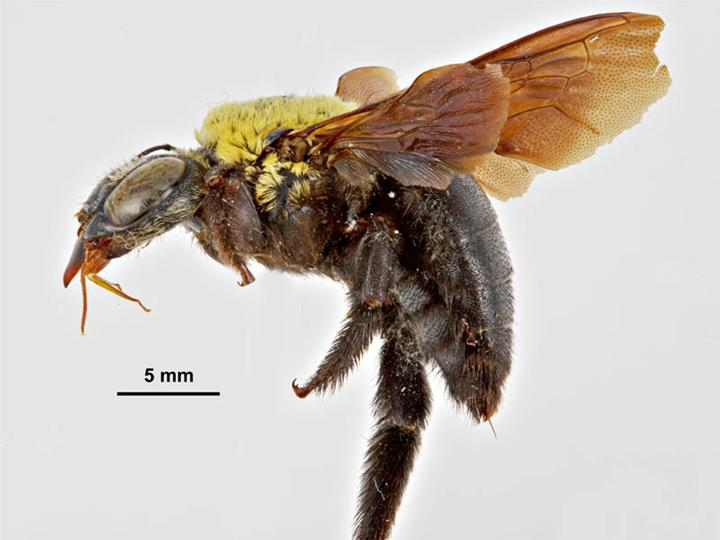

Scientific classification
- Kingdom: Animalia
- Phylum: Arthropoda
- Class: Insecta
- Order: Hymenoptera
- Family: Apidae
- Genus: Xylocopa
- Species: X. nigroclypeata

Binomial name
- Xylocopa nigroclypeata Rayment, 1935

Synonyms
- Xylocopa bryorum nigroclypeata Rayment, 1935

= Xylocopa nigroclypeata =

Species of bee

Xylocopa nigroclypeata or Xylocopa (Koptortosoma) nigroclypeata is a species of carpenter bee. It is endemic to Australia. It was described in 1935 by Australian entomologist Tarlton Rayment.

== Description ==
Body length is 19–22 mm; wing length 18–20 mm.

== Distribution and habitat ==
The species occurs in the Kimberley region of Western Australia. The holotype was collected at Wyndham. Associated habitats include open forest, shrubland and gardens.

== Behaviour ==
The adults are flying mellivores. Flowering plants visited by the bees include Tecoma, Acacia, Crotalaria, Eucalyptus and Passiflora species.
