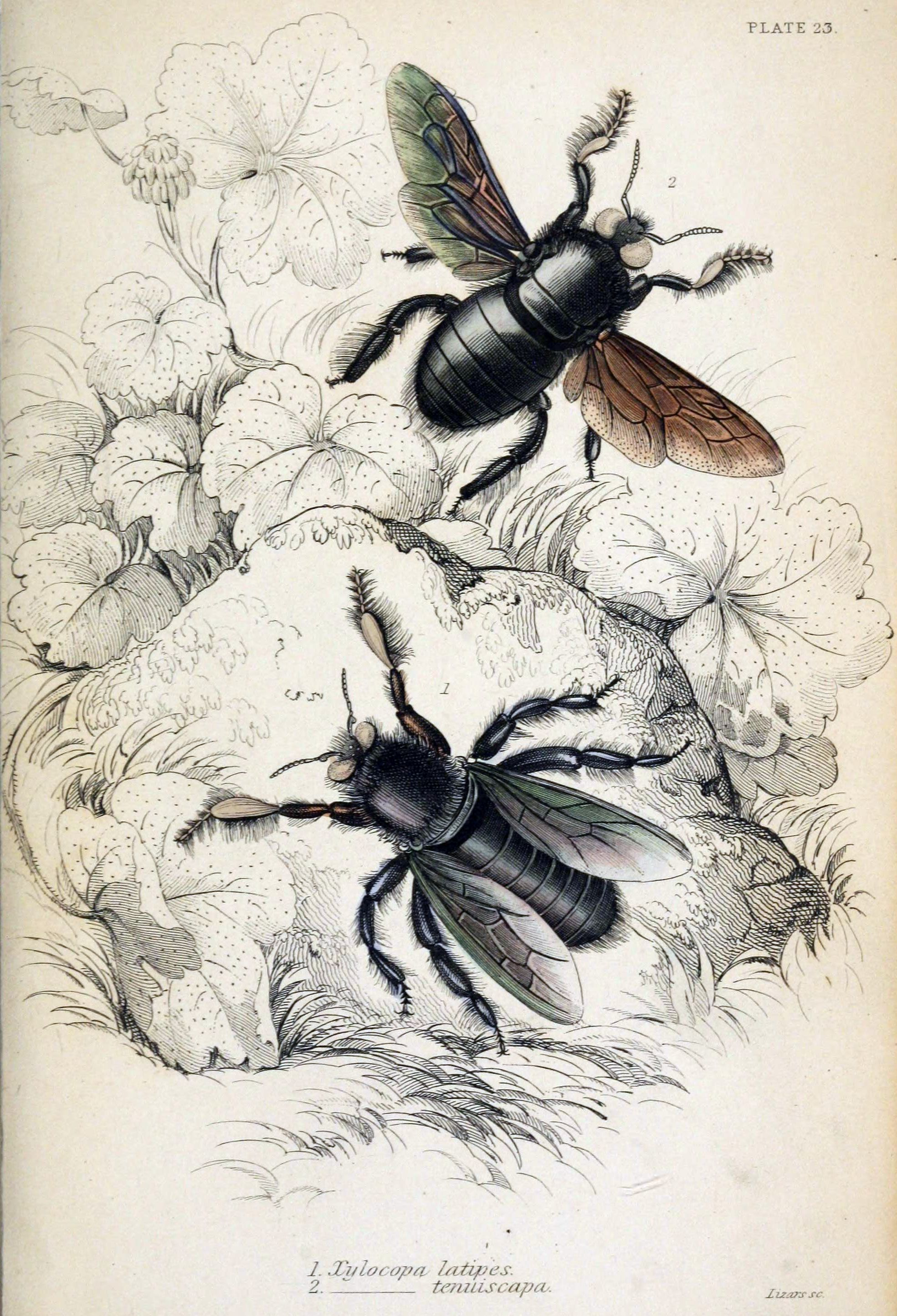
- Xylocopa tenuiscapa (male, top) as depicted in Jardine's The Naturalist's Library

Scientific classification
- Kingdom: Animalia
- Phylum: Arthropoda
- Class: Insecta
- Order: Hymenoptera
- Family: Apidae
- Genus: Xylocopa
- Subgenus: Platynopoda
- Species: X. tenuiscapa

Binomial name
- Xylocopa tenuiscapa Westwood, 1840

Synonyms
- Xylocopa latreillei Lepeletier, 1841; Xylocopa viridipennis Lepeletier, 1841; Xylocopa lativentris Blanchard, 1844; Xylocopa albo-fasciata Sichel, 1867; Xylocopa albofasciata Sichel, 1867; Xylocopa tenuicornis Ashmead, 1904

= Xylocopa tenuiscapa =

Species of bee

Xylocopa tenuiscapa is a species of carpenter bee found only in South Asian and Southeast Asian countries.

Like most bees, X. tenuiscapa has a diurnal activity cycle, but in the Western Ghats of Southern India, the species flies in moonlit nights and has been observed as pollinator of nocturnally flowering trees. Males of the species perch on exposed sites close to nests or in the landscape waiting for occasions to mate.
