= Xylocopa frontalis =

Scientific classification
- Kingdom: Animalia
- Phylum: Arthropoda
- Clade: Pancrustacea
- Class: Insecta
- Order: Hymenoptera
- Family: Apidae
- Genus: Xylocopa
- Species: X. frontalis

Binomial name
- Xylocopa frontalis (Olivier, 1789)
- Distribution Native range

Species of bee

Xylocopa frontalis, also known by its common name ridge-browed carpenter, is a species of carpenter bee (genus Xylocopa).

== Description ==
X. frontalis is part of a group of solitary bees called carpenter bees. X. frontalis is vital in the pollination of wild and cultivated large flowering plants. X. frontalis choose their nesting places very carefully. A study was done to see how X. frontalis chose their nesting sites. They found that the nesting substrates and nesting sites exhibited a clumped spatial distribution. X. frontalis had a preferred substrate and built their nests primarily on those substrates. This shows that they carefully pick out their nesting sites rather than nesting where available.

== Ecology ==
X. frontalis, together with Xylocopa grisescens are the main pollinators for Passiflora edulis, a tropical crop with significant economic value.
