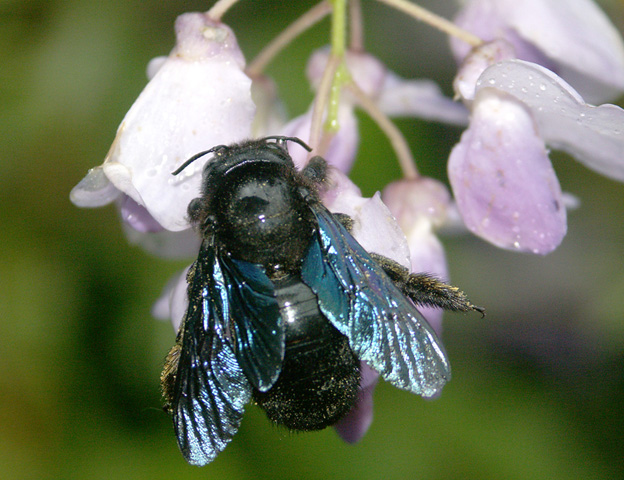
- Carpenter-bee (Xylocopa valga) foraging Chinese wisteria (Wisteria sinensis) flowers.

Conservation status
- Least Concern (IUCN 3.1)

Scientific classification
- Kingdom: Animalia
- Phylum: Arthropoda
- Class: Insecta
- Order: Hymenoptera
- Family: Apidae
- Genus: Xylocopa
- Species: X. valga

Binomial name
- Xylocopa valga Gerstaecker, 1872

= Xylocopa valga =

Species of bee

Xylocopa valga is a species of carpenter bee common to: western, central and southern Europe, except for far northern latitudes; the Caucasus; Middle East; Central Asia; and Mongolia. The species has become extinct in Latvia and Lithuania.

== Description ==
This solitary bee has a black and blue coloured body, 20–27 mm in length, and densely covered with purple hairs. The small wings also have a purple tint. The bee creates cavity nests by gnawing the wood in the trunks of dead trees and in old wooden structures. It inhabits both forests and urban areas.
