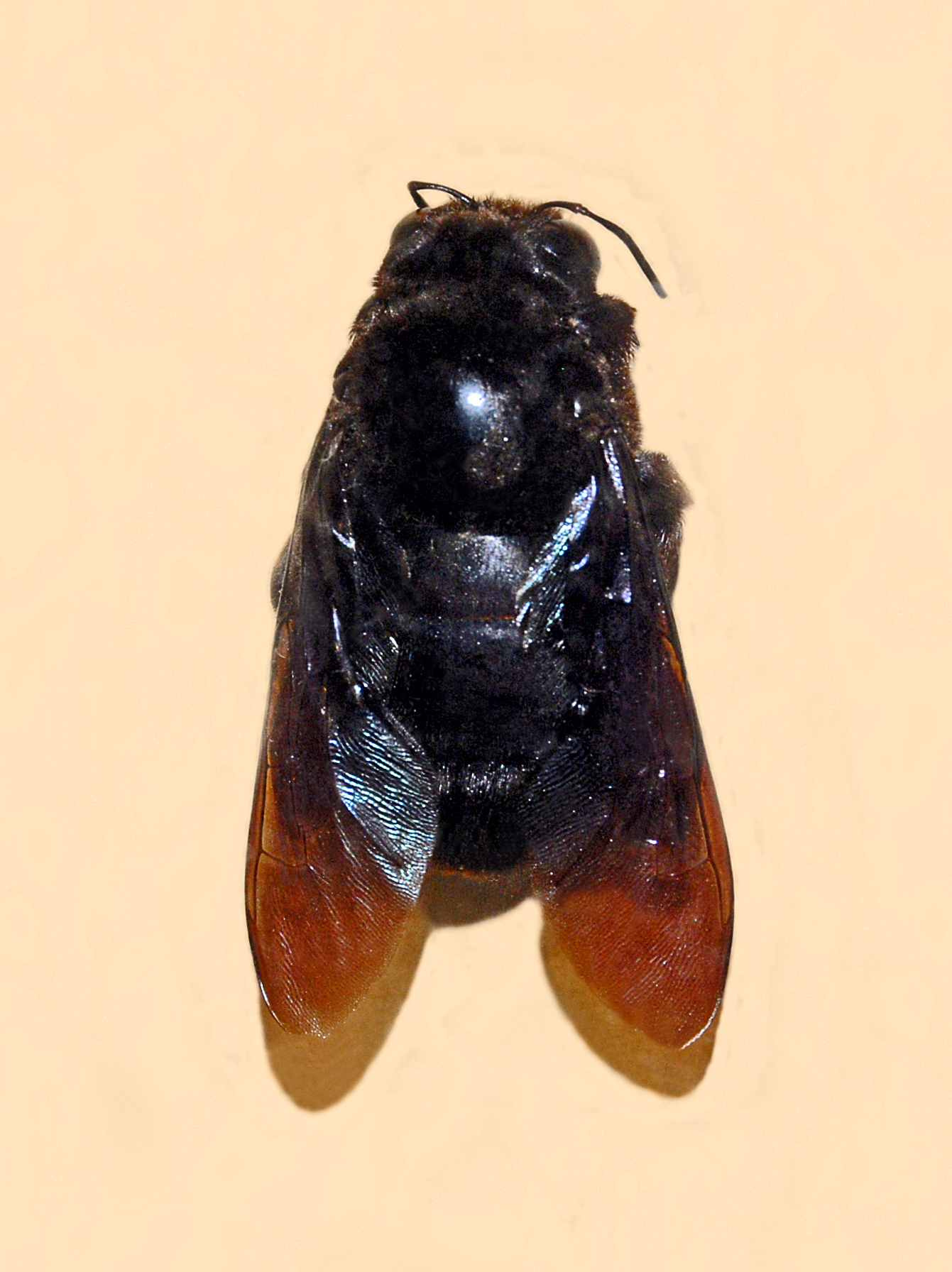
- Xylocopa combusta from Bioko Island

Scientific classification
- Kingdom: Animalia
- Phylum: Arthropoda
- Class: Insecta
- Order: Hymenoptera
- Family: Apidae
- Genus: Xylocopa
- Species: X. combusta

Binomial name
- Xylocopa combusta Smith, 1854

Synonyms
- Xylocopa taczanovskii Radoszkowsky 1876

= Xylocopa combusta =

Species of bee

Xylocopa combusta is a species of carpenter bee.

== Description ==
Xylocopa combusta has a black body with black hair on the head and the thorax. Bristles on the pygidial area are reddish.

== Distribution ==
This species can be found in Sierra Leone, Equatorial Guinea, Democratic Republic of the Congo, Somalia, Ethiopia, Tanzania, Mozambique, Angola.
