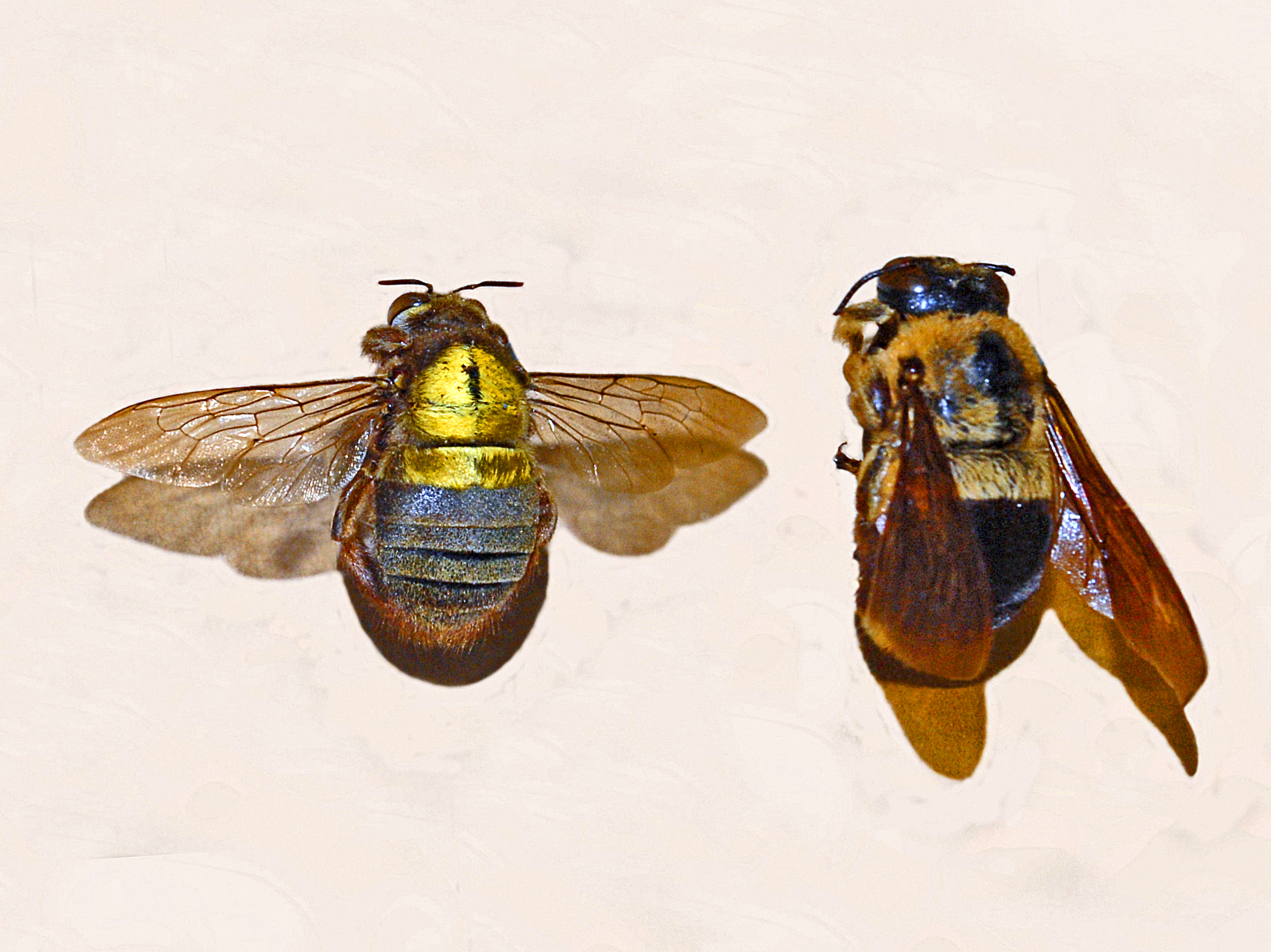
- Xylocopa africana from the Republic of the Congo, male and female

Scientific classification
- Kingdom: Animalia
- Phylum: Arthropoda
- Class: Insecta
- Order: Hymenoptera
- Family: Apidae
- Genus: Xylocopa
- Species: X. africana

Binomial name
- Xylocopa africana (Fabricius, 1781)

Synonyms
- Apis africana Fabricius, 1781; Bombus africanus (Fabricius, 1781); Bremus africanus (Fabricius, 1781); Koptortosoma africana (Fabricius, 1781); Mesotrichia africana (Fabricius, 1781)

= Xylocopa africana =

Species of bee

Xylocopa africana is a species of carpenter bee.

== Subspecies ==
- Xylocopa africana africana (Fabricius, 1781)
- Xylocopa africana congoensis Enderlein, 1903
- Xylocopa africana conradti Enderlein, 1903
- Xylocopa africana longjinensis Strand, 1911

== Description ==
In males, the thorax and the first abdominal segment are golden yellow, while in females they are brown. The abdomen is mainly dark brown or blackish.

== Distribution ==
This species can be found in Senegal, Gambia, Sierra Leone, Liberia, Togo, Nigeria, Cameroon, Republic of the Congo, the Democratic Republic of the Congo, Equatorial Guinea, Gabon, Uganda and Angola.
