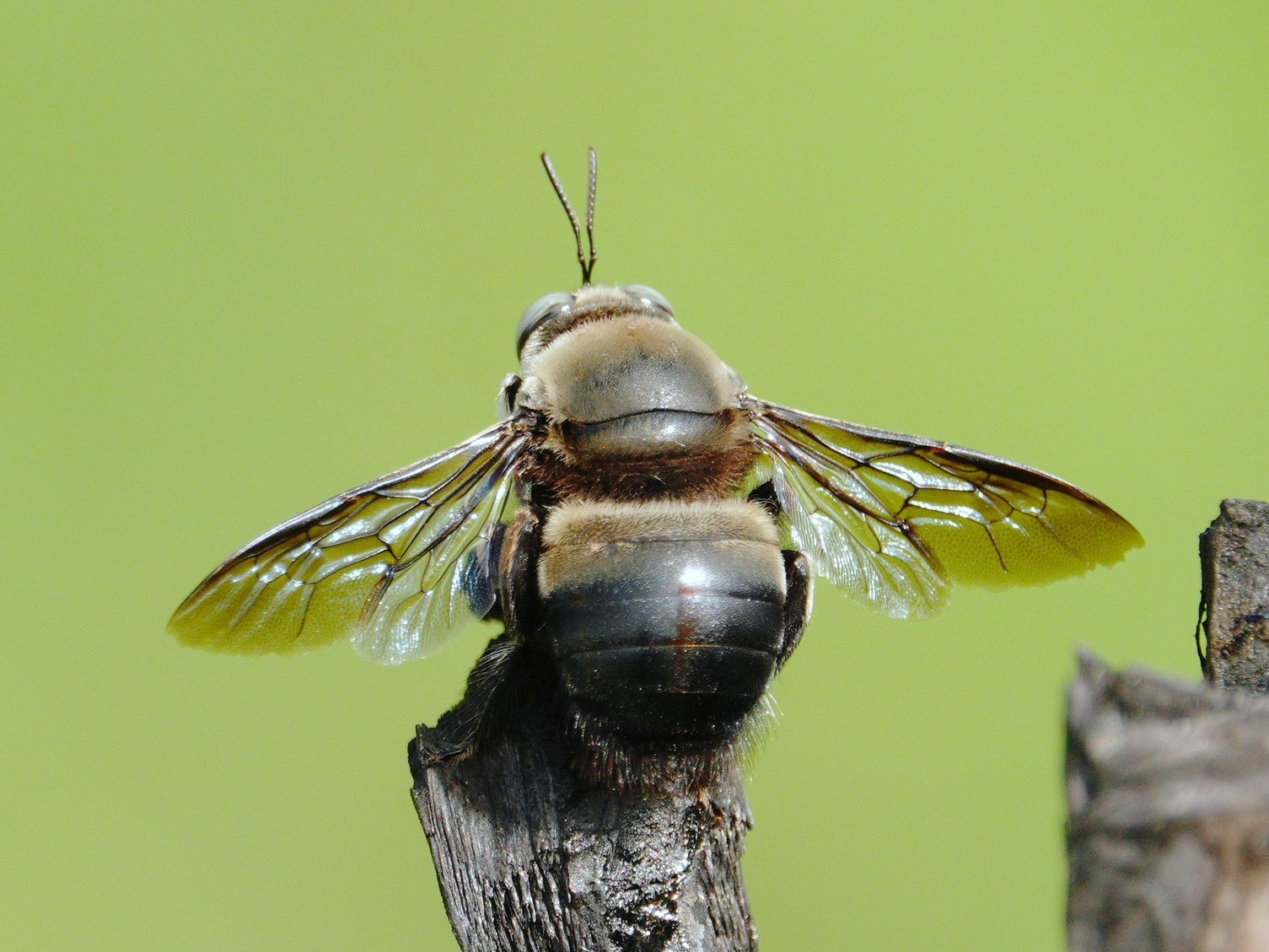

Scientific classification
- Kingdom: Animalia
- Phylum: Arthropoda
- Class: Insecta
- Order: Hymenoptera
- Family: Apidae
- Genus: Xylocopa
- Subgenus: Zonohirsuta
- Species: X. dejeanii

Binomial name
- Xylocopa dejeanii Lepeletier, 1841

= Xylocopa dejeanii =

Species of bee

Xylocopa dejeanii, or Xylocopa (Zonohirsuta) dejeanii, is a species of carpenter bee. It is widely distributed in Asian countries.
