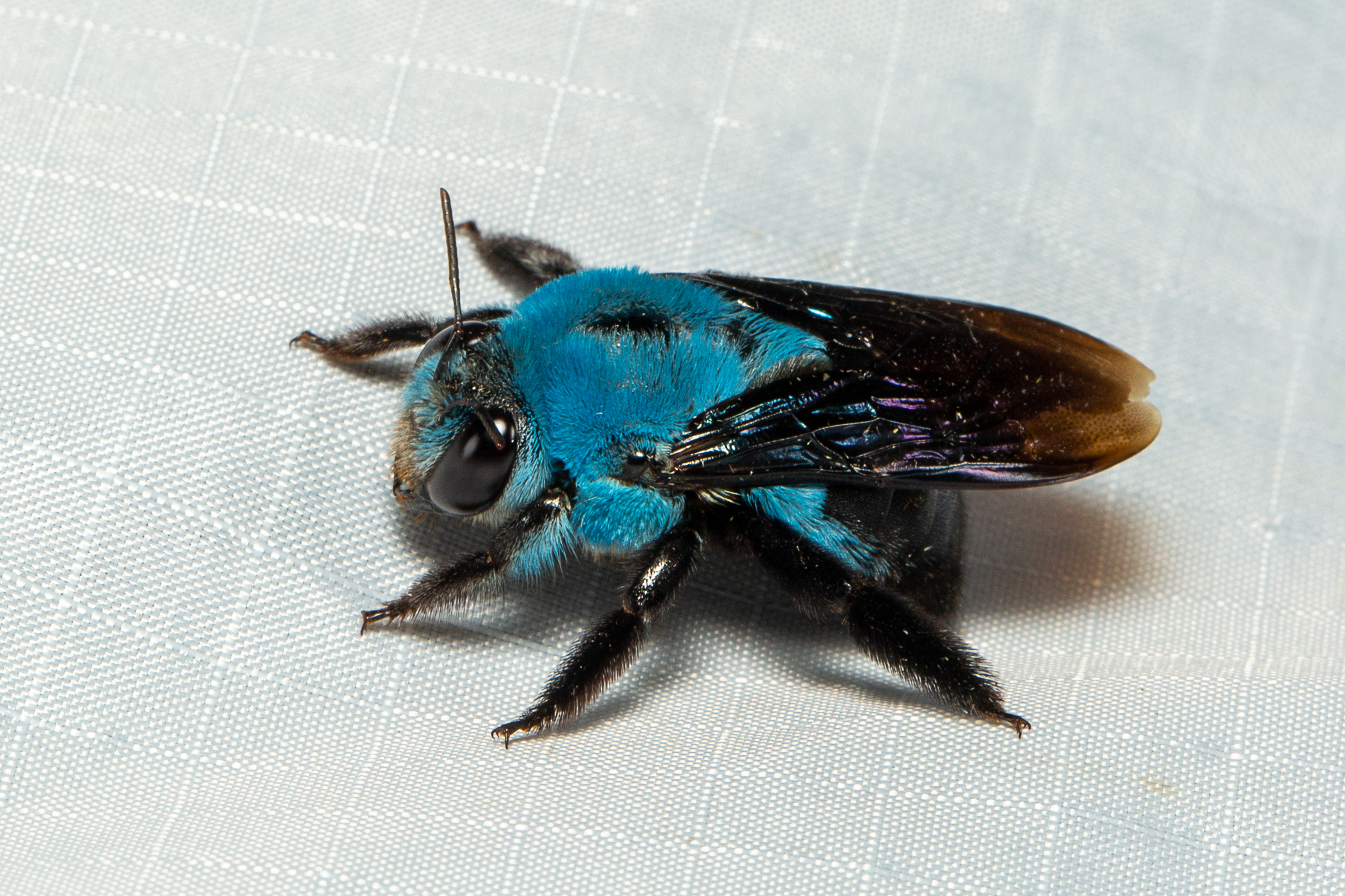

Scientific classification
- Kingdom: Animalia
- Phylum: Arthropoda
- Clade: Pancrustacea
- Class: Insecta
- Order: Hymenoptera
- Family: Apidae
- Genus: Xylocopa
- Species: X. caerulea

Binomial name
- Xylocopa caerulea Fabricius, 1804

= Xylocopa caerulea =

Species of bee

Xylocopa caerulea, or the blue carpenter bee, is a species of carpenter bee.

== Description ==
Xylocopa caerulea is a relatively large species, reaching an average size of 23 mm (0.91 in). The species is sexually dimorphic, with the thoraces of the females having striking blue color and the males' thoraces looking more brownish green. The sides of the abdomen and first abdominal segments are also covered by a similar, albeit finer and thinner, coat of blue hairs. The reflectance spectrum of the thorax of a female Xylocopa caerulea has a broad band in the blue wavelength range, with a trough around 600 nm, indicating the presence of a pigment that strongly reduces reflection in the red wavelength range.

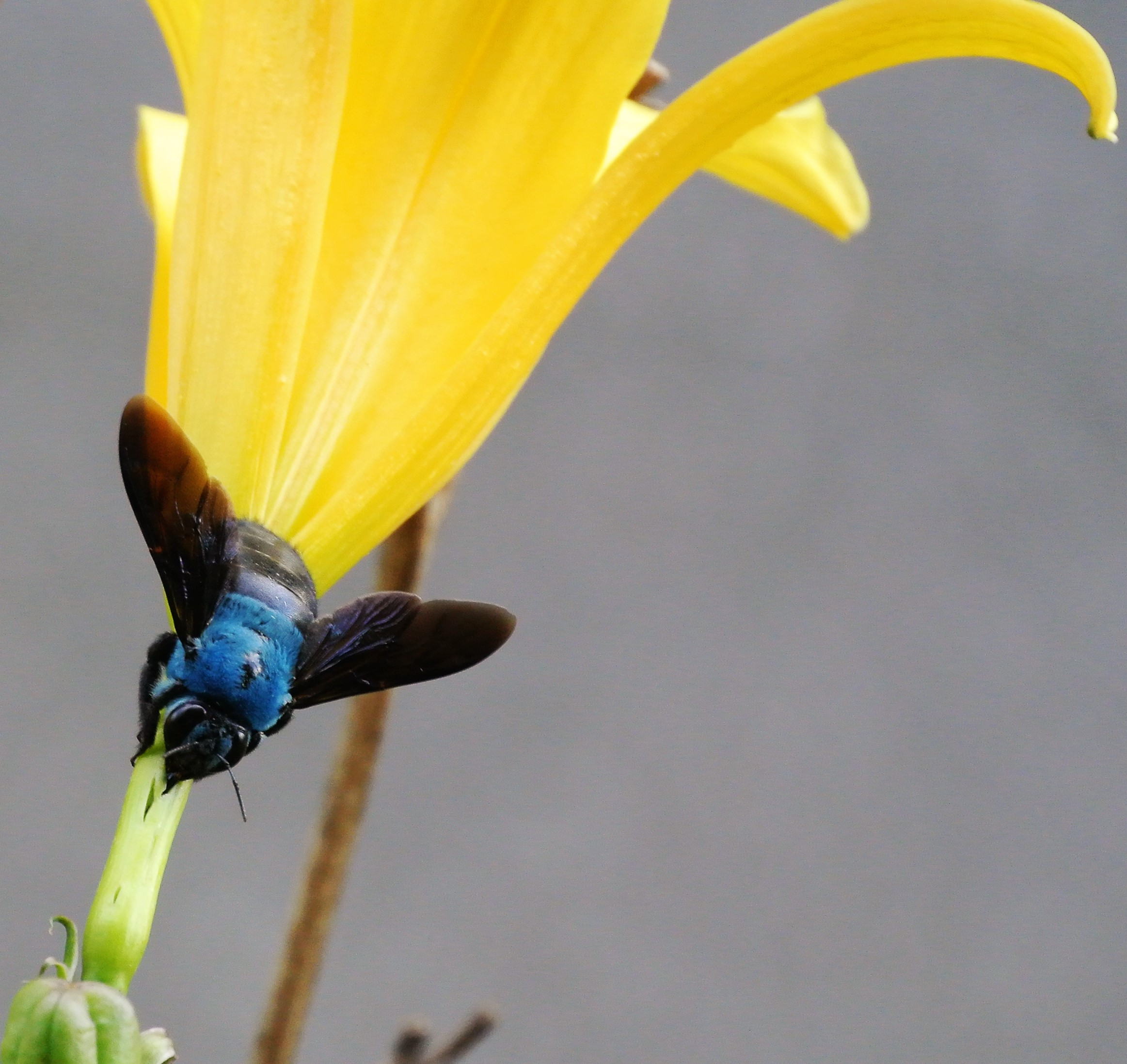

== Distribution ==
This species is widely distributed in Southeast Asia, India and Southern China.

== Behavior ==
Xylocopa caerulea will burrow into trees to make their nests. They usually are solitary, but sometimes multiple bees will share a common entry hole. They create honey which is mixed with pollen to create ambrosia or bee bread. This species will place the bee bread in a wooden chamber which they then lay their eggs on top of. The bee bread serves as a food source for their larvae.
