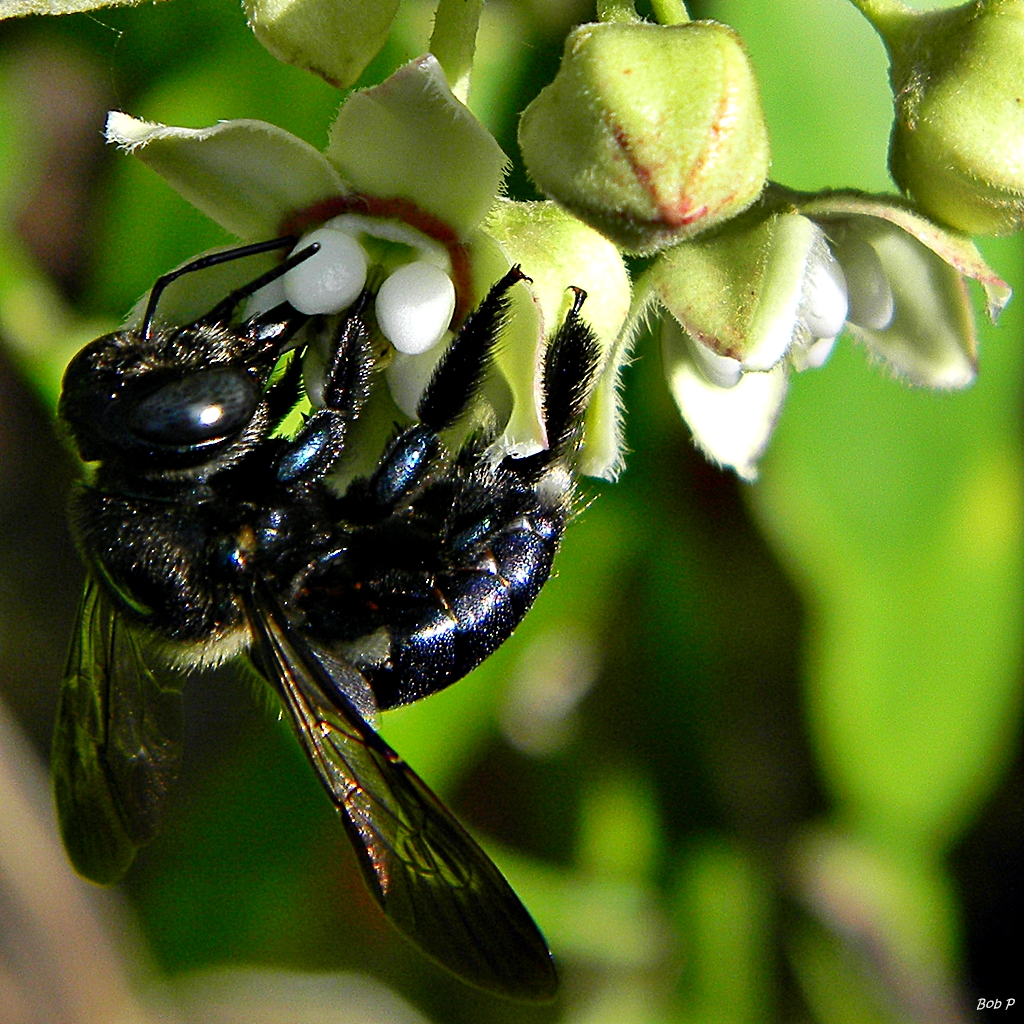
- Foraging female X. micans

Scientific classification
- Kingdom: Animalia
- Phylum: Arthropoda
- Clade: Pancrustacea
- Class: Insecta
- Order: Hymenoptera
- Family: Apidae
- Subfamily: Xylocopinae
- Tribe: Xylocopini
- Genus: Xylocopa; Latreille, 1802

Type species
- Xylocopa violacea Linnaeus, 1758

Species
- See text

Audio
- Sounds emitted from a nest of X. pubescens

= Carpenter bee =

Carpenter bees

Common name for a genus of bees

Carpenter bees are species in the genus Xylocopa of the subfamily Xylocopinae. The genus includes some 500 bees in 31 subgenera. Both the scientific name Xylocopa and common name "carpenter bee" derive from their nesting behavior; nearly all species burrow into hard plant material such as dead wood or bamboo. The main exceptions are species in the subgenus Proxylocopa, which dig nesting tunnels in suitable soil.

Linnaeus named the type species Apis violacea 'violet bee' in the Systema Naturae, and Latreille described the genus Xylocopa, romanized Ancient Greek: ξυλοκόπος, lit. 'wood-cutter', in his Natural history, general and particular of the crustaceans and insects, to which the type species was reassigned.

== Characteristics ==
Many species in this enormous genus are difficult to tell apart; most species are all black, or primarily black with some yellow or white pubescence. Some differ only in subtle morphological features, such as details of the male genitalia. Males of some species differ confusingly from the females, being covered in greenish-yellow fur. The confusion of species arises particularly in the common names; in India, for example, the common name for any all-black species of Xylocopa is bhanvra (or bhomora - ভোমোৰা - in Assamese), and reports and sightings of bhanvra or bhomora are commonly misattributed to a European species, Xylocopa violacea; however, this species is found only in the northern regions of Jammu and Kashmir and Punjab, and most reports of bhanvra, especially elsewhere in India, refer to any of roughly 15 other common black Xylocopa species in the region, such as X. nasalis, X. tenuiscapa, or X. tranquebarorum.

Non-professionals commonly confuse carpenter bees with bumblebees; the simplest rule of thumb for telling them apart is that most carpenter bees have a shiny abdomen, whereas bumblebee abdomens are completely covered with dense hair. Males of some species of carpenter bees have a white or yellow face, unlike bumblebees, while females lack the bare corbicula of bumblebees; the hind leg is entirely hairy.

The wing venation is characteristic; the marginal cell in the front wing is narrow and elongated, and its apex bends away from the costa. The front wing has small stigma. When closed, the bee's short mandibles conceal the labrum. The clypeus is flat. Males of many species have much larger eyes than the females, which relates to their mating behavior.

In the United States, two eastern species, Xylocopa virginica and X. micans, occur. Three more species are primarily western in distribution, X. sonorina, X. tabaniformis orpifex, and X. californica. X. virginica is by far the more widely distributed species.

== Behavior ==
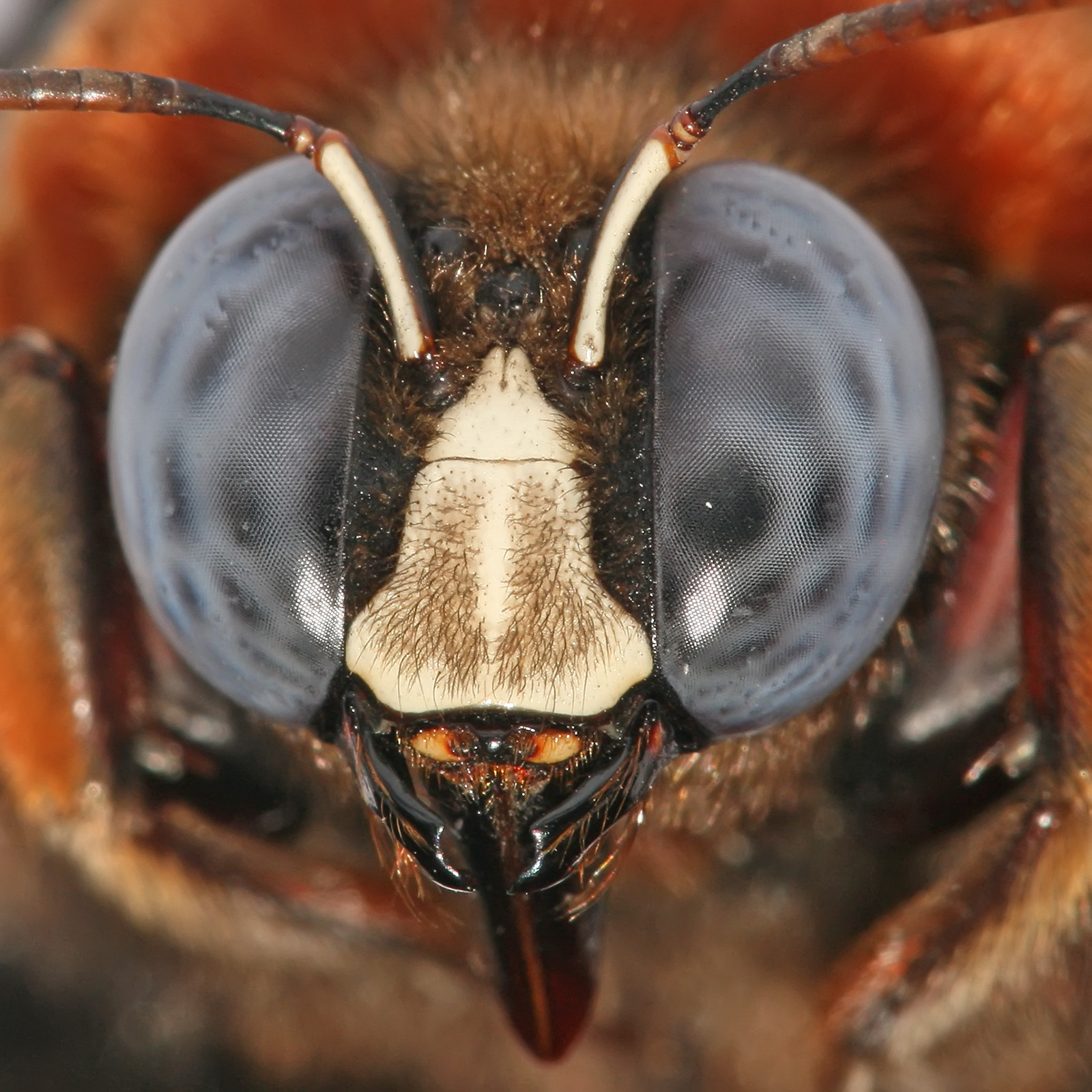
Carpenter bees have large compound eyes. Their mandibles, when closed, cover the labrum.

As a subfamily, they nest in a wide range of host plants, but any one species may show definite adaptations or preferences for particular groups of plants. Carpenter bees are traditionally considered solitary bees, although some species have simple social nests in which mothers and daughters may cohabit. Examples of this type of social nesting can be seen in the species Xylocopa sulcatipes and Xylocopa nasalis. When females cohabit, a division of labor sometimes occurs between them. For example, multiple females may share in the foraging and nest laying, or one female does all the foraging and nest laying, while the other females guard.

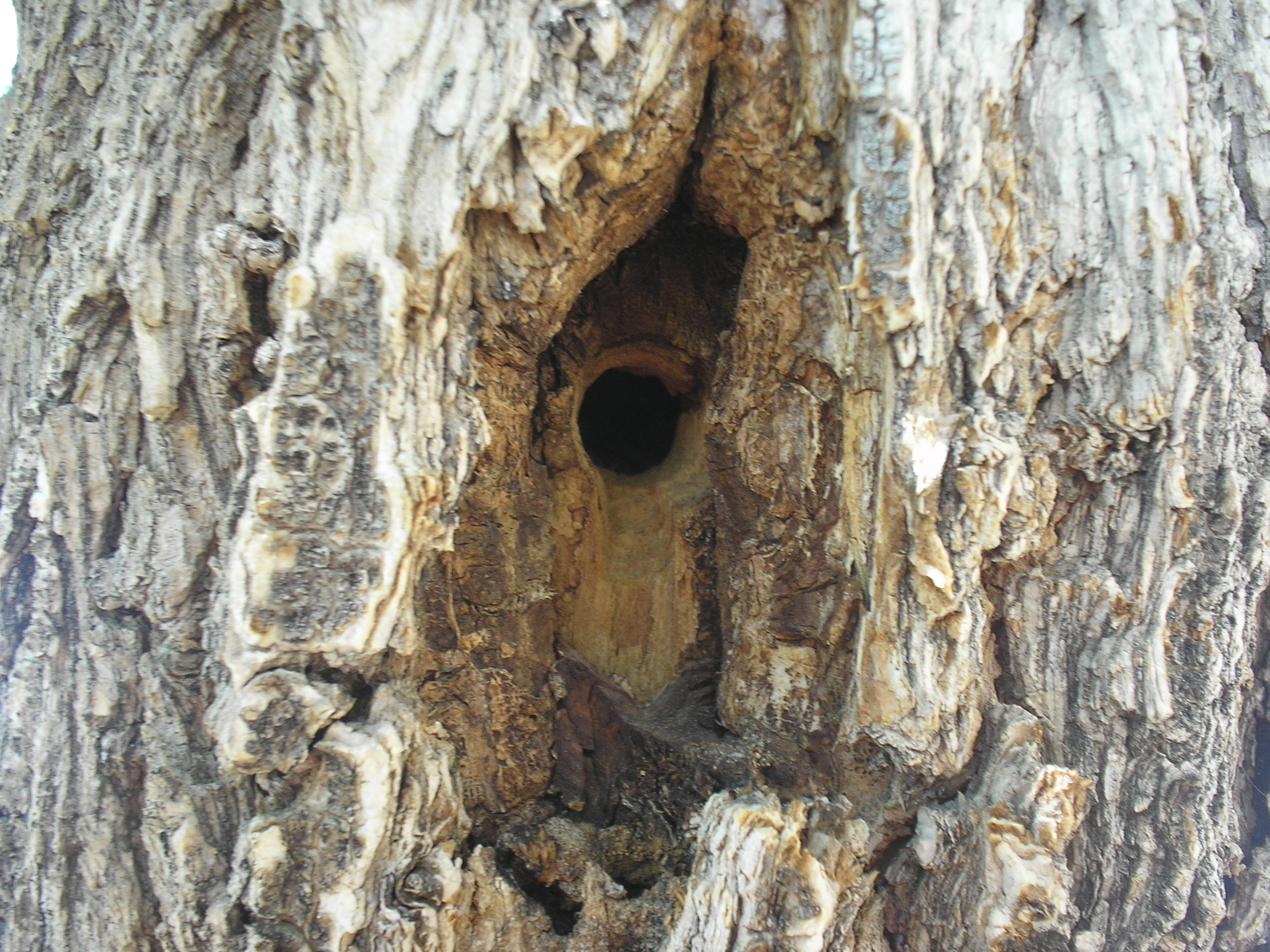
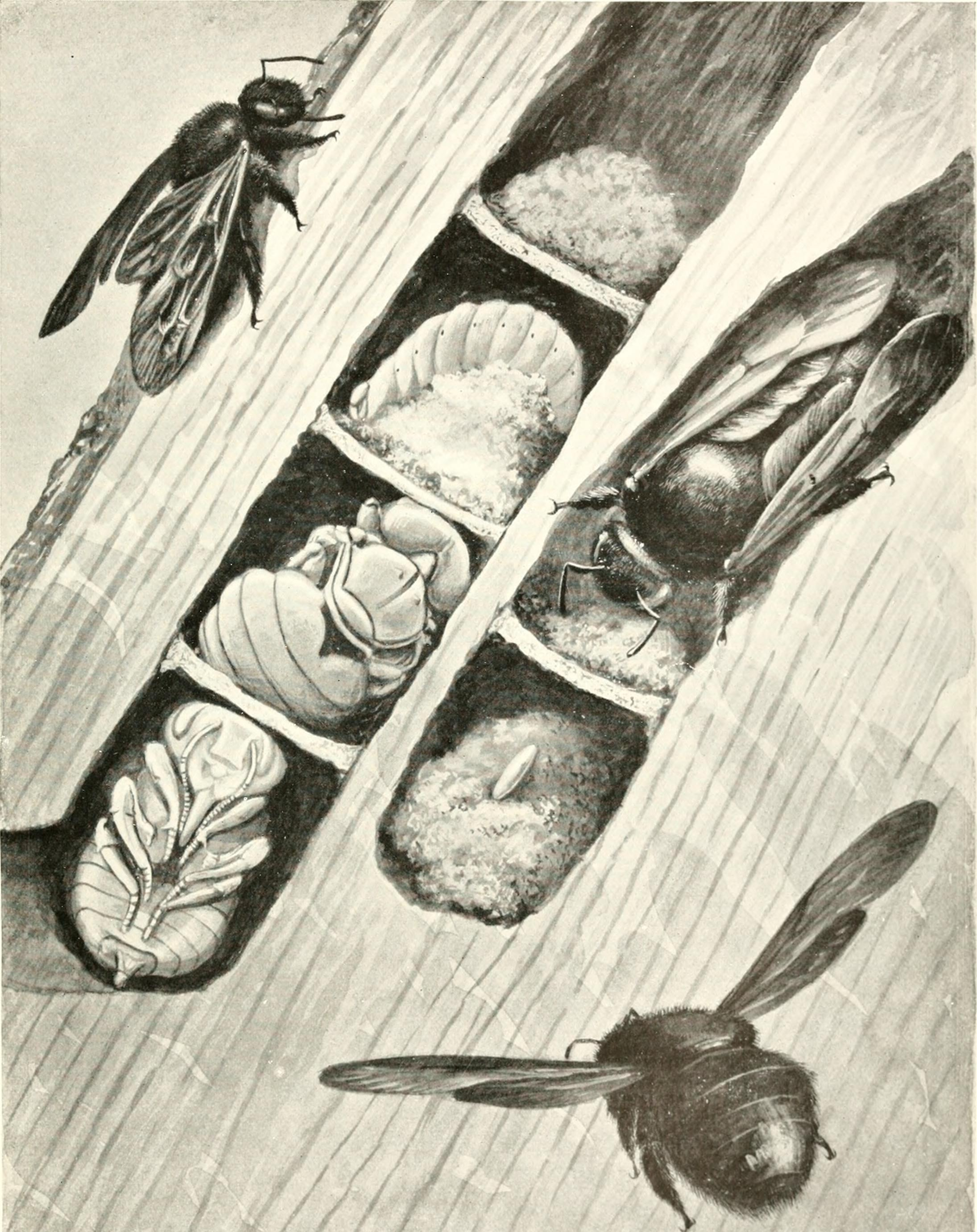
Tunnel entrance, and cross-section of the brood chambers of X. violacea (Note: Tunnels are excavated in wooden posts, divided into chambers which are provisioned, and an egg is laid in each; each cell initially contains a mass of pollen with the egg, on which the grub will feed; the pupa (lower left) is seen from back and front. Illustrated by Theo Carreras.)

Solitary species differ from social species. Solitary bees tend to be gregarious and often several nests of solitary bees are located near each other. In solitary nesting, the founding bee forages, builds cells, lays the eggs, and guards. Normally, only one generation of bees lives in the nest. Xylocopa pubescens is one carpenter bee species that can have both social and solitary nests. Carpenter bees make nests by tunneling into wood, bamboo, and similar hard plant material such as peduncles, usually dead. They vibrate their bodies as they rasp their mandibles against hardwood, each nest having a single entrance which may have many adjacent tunnels. The entrance is often a perfectly circular hole measuring about 16 mm (0.63 in) on the underside of a beam, bench, or tree limb. Carpenter bees do not eat wood; they discard the bits of wood, or reuse particles to build partitions between cells. The tunnel functions as a nursery for brood and storage for the pollen/nectar upon which the brood subsists. The provision masses of some species are among the most complex in shape of any group of bees; whereas most bees fill their brood cells with a soupy mass and others form simple spheroidal pollen masses, Xylocopa species form elongated and carefully sculpted masses that have several projections which keep the bulk of the mass from coming into contact with the cell walls, sometimes resembling an irregular caltrop. The eggs are very large relative to the size of the female, and are some of the largest eggs among all insects. Carpenter bees can be timber pests, and cause substantial damage to wood if infestations go undetected for several years.

Two very different mating systems appear to be common in carpenter bees, and often this can be determined simply by examining specimens of the males of any given species. Species in which the males have large eyes are characterized by a mating system where the males either search for females by patrolling, or by hovering and waiting for passing females, which they then pursue. In the other mating system, the males often have very small heads, but a large, hypertrophied glandular reservoir in the mesosoma releases pheromones into the airstream behind the male while it flies or hovers. The pheromone advertises the presence of the male to females.

Male bees are often seen hovering near nests and will approach nearby animals. However, males are harmless, since they do not have a stinger. Female carpenter bees are capable of stinging, but they are docile and rarely sting unless caught in the hand or otherwise directly provoked.

=== Ecological significance ===
In several species, the females live alongside their own daughters or sisters, creating a small social group. They use wood bits to form partitions between the cells in the nest. A few species bore holes in wood dwellings, chewing out burrows with their robust mandibles. Since the tunnels are near the surface, structural damage is generally minor or superficial. However, carpenter bee nests are attractive to woodpeckers, which may do further damage by drilling into the wood to feed on the bees or larvae.

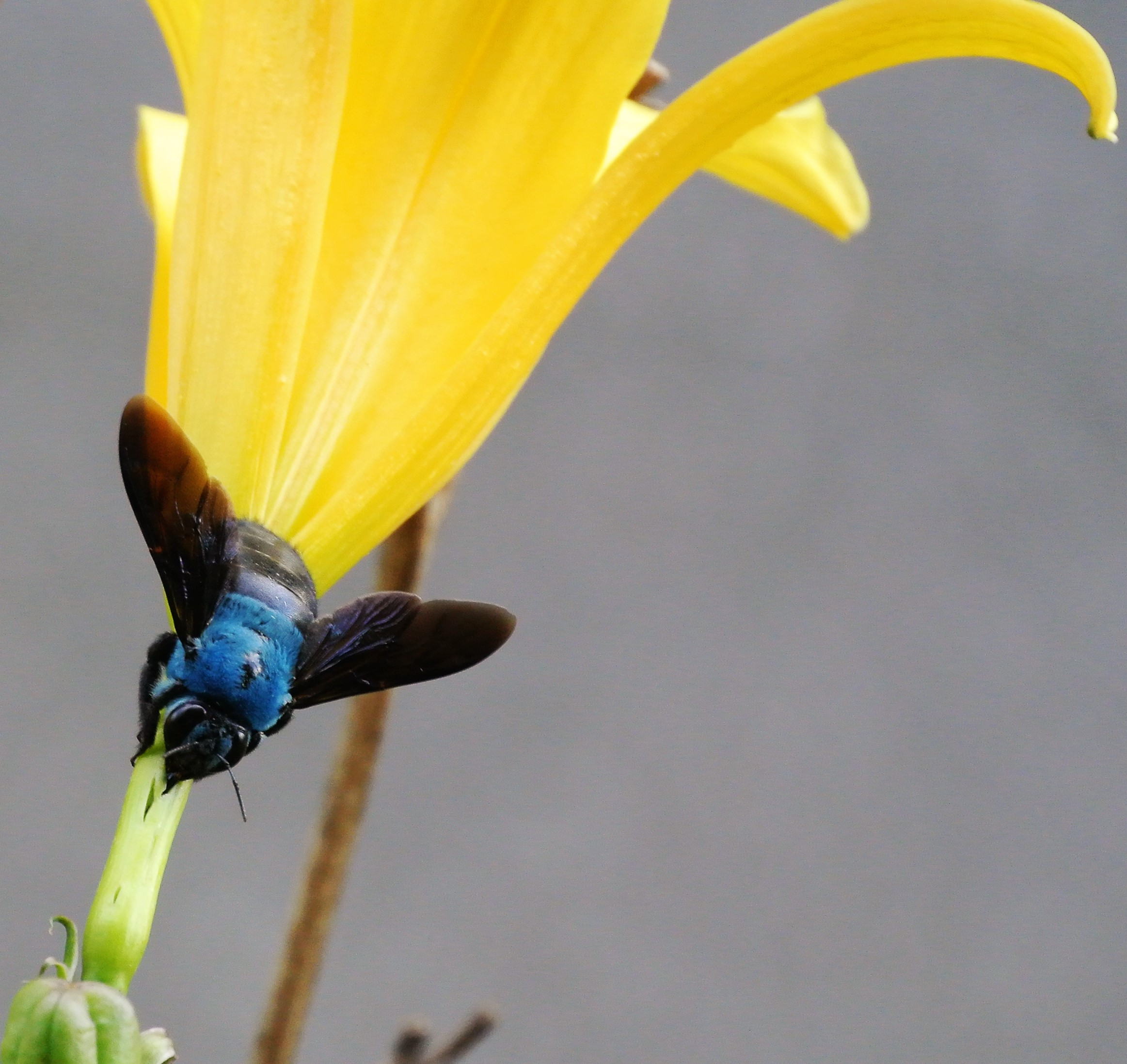
Xylocopa caerulea, the blue carpenter bee, engaged in nectar robbing

Carpenter bees have short mouthparts and are important pollinators on some open-faced or shallow flowers; for some they even are obligate pollinators, for example the maypop (Passiflora incarnata) and Orphium, which are not pollinated by any other insects. They also are important pollinators of flowers with various forms of lids, such as Salvia species and some members of the Fabaceae. However many carpenter bees "rob" nectar by slitting the sides of flowers with deep corollae. Xylocopa virginica is one example of a species with such nectar robbing behavior. With their short labia the bees cannot reach the nectar without piercing the long-tubed flowers; they miss contact with the anthers and perform no pollination. In some plants, this reduces fruit and seed production, while others have developed defense mechanisms against nectar robbing. When foraging for pollen from some species with tubular flowers however, the same species of carpenter bees still achieve pollination, if the anthers and stigmata are exposed together.

Many Old World carpenter bees have a special pouch-like structure on the inside of their first metasomal tergite called the acarinarium where certain mites (Dinogamasus species) reside as commensals or symbionts. The exact nature of the relationship is not fully understood, though in other bees that carry mites, they are beneficial, feeding either on fungi in the nest, or on other harmful mites.

== Predators ==
Woodpeckers eat carpenter bees, being attracted to the noise of the bee larvae and drill holes along the tunnels to feed on them. Other species of birds also prey on these bees, such as shrikes and bee-eaters as well as some mammals such as ratels. Other predators include large mantises and predatory flies, particularly large robber-flies (Asilidae).

Apart from outright predators, parasitoidal species of bee flies (e.g. Xenox) lay eggs in the entrance to the bee's nest and the fly maggots live off the bee larvae.

== Species ==
- Xylocopa abbotti (Cockerell, 1909)
- Xylocopa abbreviata Hurd & Moure, 1963
- Xylocopa acutipennis Smith, 1854
- Xylocopa adumbrata Lieftinck, 1957
- Xylocopa adusta Pérez, 1901
- Xylocopa aeneipennis (DeGeer, 1773)
- Xylocopa aerata (Smith, 1851)
- Xylocopa aestuans (Linnaeus, 1758)
- Xylocopa aethiopica Pérez, 1901
- Xylocopa africana (Fabricius, 1781)
- Xylocopa albiceps Fabricius, 1804
- Xylocopa albifrons Lepeletier, 1841
- Xylocopa albinotum Matsumura, 1926
- Xylocopa alternata Pérez, 1901
- Xylocopa alticola (Cockerell, 1919)
- Xylocopa amamensis Sonan, 1934
- Xylocopa amauroptera Pérez, 1901
- Xylocopa amazonica Enderlein, 1913
- Xylocopa amedaei Lepeletier, 1841
- Xylocopa amethystina (Fabricius, 1793)
- Xylocopa andica Enderlein, 1913
- Xylocopa angulosa Maa, 1954
- Xylocopa anthophoroides Smith, 1874
- Xylocopa apicalis Smith, 1854
- Xylocopa appendiculata Smith, 1852
- Xylocopa artifex Smith, 1874
- Xylocopa aruana Ritsema, 1876
- Xylocopa assimilis Ritsema, 1880
- Xylocopa atamisquensis Lucia & Abrahamovich, 2010
- Xylocopa augusti Lepeletier, 1841
- Xylocopa auripennis Lepeletier, 1841
- Xylocopa aurorea Friese, 1922
- Xylocopa aurulenta (Fabricius, 1804)
- Xylocopa bakeriana (Cockerell, 1914)
- Xylocopa balteata Maa, 1943
- Xylocopa bambusae Schrottky, 1902
- Xylocopa bangkaensis Friese, 1903
- Xylocopa barbatella Cockerell, 1931
- Xylocopa bariwal Maidl, 1912
- Xylocopa basalis Smith, 1854
- Xylocopa bentoni Cockerell, 1919
- Xylocopa bequaerti (Cockerell, 1930)
- Xylocopa bhowara Maa, 1938
- Xylocopa biangulata Vachal, 1899
- Xylocopa bicarinata Alfken, 1932
- Xylocopa bicristata Maa, 1954
- Xylocopa bilineata Friese, 1914
- Xylocopa bimaculata Friese, 1903
- Xylocopa binongkona van der Vecht, 1953
- Xylocopa bluethgeni Dusmet y Alonso, 1924
- Xylocopa bombiformis Smith, 1874
- Xylocopa bomboides Smith, 1879
- Xylocopa bombylans (Fabricius, 1775)
- Xylocopa boops Maidl, 1912
- Xylocopa bouyssoui Vachal, 1898
- Xylocopa brasilianorum (Linnaeus, 1767)
- Xylocopa braunsi Dusmet y Alonso, 1924
- Xylocopa bruesi Cockerell, 1914
- Xylocopa bryorum (Fabricius, 1775)
- Xylocopa buginesica Vecht, 1953
- Xylocopa buruana Lieftinck, 1956
- Xylocopa caerulea (Fabricius, 1804)
- Xylocopa caffra (Linnaeus, 1767)
- Xylocopa calcarata (LeVeque, 1928)
- Xylocopa calens Lepeletier, 1841
- Xylocopa californica Cresson, 1864
- Xylocopa caloptera Pérez, 1901
- Xylocopa canaria (Cockerell & LeVeque, 1925)
- Xylocopa cantabrita Lepeletier, 1841
- Xylocopa capensis Spinola, 1838
- Xylocopa capitata Smith, 1854
- Xylocopa carbonaria Smith, 1854
- Xylocopa caribea Lepeletier, 1841
- Xylocopa caspari van der Vecht, 1953
- Xylocopa caviventris Maidl, 1912
- Xylocopa cearensis Ducke, 1911
- Xylocopa ceballosi Dusmet y Alonso, 1924
- Xylocopa celebensis (Gribodo, 1894)
- Xylocopa chapini (LeVeque, 1928)
- Xylocopa chinensis Friese, 1911
- Xylocopa chiyakensis (Cockerell, 1908)
- Xylocopa chlorina (Cockerell, 1915)
- Xylocopa chrysopoda Schrottky, 1902
- Xylocopa chrysoptera Latreille, 1809
- Xylocopa ciliata Burmeister, 1876
- Xylocopa citrina Friese, 1909
- Xylocopa clarionensis Hurd, 1958
- Xylocopa claripennis Friese, 1922
- Xylocopa cloti Vachal, 1898
- Xylocopa cockerelli Maa, 1943
- Xylocopa codinai Dusmet y Alonso, 1924
- Xylocopa colona Lepeletier, 1841
- Xylocopa columbiensis Pérez, 1901
- Xylocopa combinata Ritsema, 1876
- Xylocopa combusta Smith, 1854
- Xylocopa concolorata Maa, 1938
- Xylocopa conradsiana Friese, 1911
- Xylocopa coracina van der Vecht, 1953
- Xylocopa cornigera Friese, 1909
- Xylocopa coronata Smith, 1861
- Xylocopa cribrata Pérez, 1901
- Xylocopa cubaecola Lucas, 1857
- Xylocopa cuernosensis (Cockerell, 1915)
- Xylocopa cyanea Smith, 1874
- Xylocopa cyanescens Brullé, 1832
- Xylocopa dalbertisi Lieftinck, 1957
- Xylocopa dapitanensis (Cockerell, 1915)
- Xylocopa darwini Cockerell, 1926
- Xylocopa dejeanii Lepeletier, 1841
- Xylocopa dibongoana Hedicke, 1923
- Xylocopa dimidiata Latreille, 1809
- Xylocopa disconota Friese, 1914
- Xylocopa distinguenda Pérez, 1901
- Xylocopa ditypa Vachal, 1898
- Xylocopa diversipes Smith, 1861
- Xylocopa dolosa Vachal, 1899
- Xylocopa dormeyeri (Enderlein, 1909)
- Xylocopa duala Strand, 1921
- Xylocopa electa Smith, 1874
- Xylocopa elegans Hurd & Moure, 1963
- Xylocopa erlangeri Enderlein, 1903
- Xylocopa erythrina Gribodo, 1894
- Xylocopa escalerai Dusmet y Alonso, 1924
- Xylocopa esica Cameron, 1902
- Xylocopa euchlora Pérez, 1901
- Xylocopa euxantha Cockerell, 1933
- Xylocopa eximia Pérez, 1901
- Xylocopa fabriciana Moure, 1960
- Xylocopa fallax Maidl, 1912
- Xylocopa fenestrata (Fabricius, 1798)
- Xylocopa fervens Lepeletier, 1841
- Xylocopa fimbriata Fabricius, 1804
- Xylocopa flavicollis (DeGeer, 1778)
- Xylocopa flavifrons Matsumura, 1912
- Xylocopa flavonigrescens Smith, 1854
- Xylocopa flavorufa (DeGeer, 1778)
- Xylocopa forbesii W. F. Kirby, 1883
- Xylocopa forsiusi Dusmet y Alonso, 1924
- Xylocopa fortissima Cockerell, 1930
- Xylocopa fransseni van der Vecht, 1953
- Xylocopa friesiana Maa, 1939
- Xylocopa frontalis (Olivier, 1789)
- Xylocopa fuliginata Pérez, 1901
- Xylocopa fulva Friese, 1922
- Xylocopa funesta Maidl, 1912
- Xylocopa fuscata Smith, 1854
- Xylocopa gabonica (Gribodo, 1894)
- †Xylocopa gabrielae Engel, 2001
- Xylocopa ganglbaueri Maidl, 1912
- Xylocopa gaullei Vachal, 1898
- Xylocopa ghilianii Gribodo, 1891
- Xylocopa gracilis Dusmet y Alonso, 1923
- Xylocopa graueri Maidl, 1912
- Xylocopa gressitti Lieftinck, 1957
- Xylocopa gribodoi Magretti, 1892
- Xylocopa grisescens Lepeletier, 1841
- Xylocopa griswoldi Mérida, Hinojosa-Díaz, & Ayala, 2022
- Xylocopa grossa (Drury, 1770)
- Xylocopa grubaueri Friese, 1903
- Xylocopa gualanensis Cockerell, 1912
- Xylocopa guatemalensis Cockerell, 1912
- Xylocopa guigliae Lieftinck, 1957
- Xylocopa haefligeri Friese, 1909
- Xylocopa haematospila Moure, 1951
- Xylocopa hafizii Maa, 1938
- Xylocopa hellenica Spinola, 1843
- Xylocopa hirsutissima Maidl, 1912
- Xylocopa hottentotta Smith, 1854
- Xylocopa hyalinipennis Friese, 1922
- Xylocopa ignescens (LeVeque, 1928)
- Xylocopa imitator Smith, 1854
- Xylocopa incandescens (Cockerell, 1932)
- Xylocopa incerta Pérez, 1901
- Xylocopa incompleta Ritsema, 1880
- Xylocopa inconspicua Maa, 1937
- Xylocopa inconstans Smith, 1874
- Xylocopa inquirenda Vachal, 1899
- Xylocopa insola Vachal, 1910
- Xylocopa insularis Smith, 1857
- Xylocopa io Vachal, 1898
- Xylocopa iranica Maa, 1954
- Xylocopa iridipennis Lepeletier, 1841
- Xylocopa iris (Christ, 1791)
- Xylocopa isabelleae Hurd, 1959
- Xylocopa javana Friese, 1914
- Xylocopa kamerunensis Vachal, 1899
- Xylocopa karnyi Maidl, 1912
- Xylocopa kerri (Cockerell, 1929)
- Xylocopa kuehni Friese, 1903
- Xylocopa lachnea Moure, 1951
- Xylocopa lanata Smith, 1854
- Xylocopa langi (LeVeque, 1928)
- Xylocopa lateralis Say, 1837
- Xylocopa lateritia Smith, 1854
- Xylocopa laticeps
- Xylocopa latipes (Drury, 1773)
- Xylocopa lautipennis (Cockerell, 1933)
- Xylocopa lehmanni Friese, 1903
- Xylocopa lepeletieri Enderlein, 1903
- Xylocopa leucocephala Ritsema, 1876
- Xylocopa leucothoracoides Maidl, 1912
- Xylocopa levequeae Maa, 1943
- Xylocopa lieftincki Leys, 2000
- Xylocopa lombokensis Maidl, 1912
- Xylocopa longespinosa Enderlein, 1903
- Xylocopa longula Friese, 1922
- Xylocopa loripes Smith, 1874
- Xylocopa lucbanensis (Cockerell, 1927)
- Xylocopa lucida Smith, 1874
- Xylocopa lugubris Gerstäcker, 1857
- Xylocopa lundqvisti Lieftinck, 1957
- Xylocopa luteola Lepeletier, 1841
- Xylocopa macrops Lepeletier, 1841
- Xylocopa madida Friese, 1925
- Xylocopa madurensis Friese, 1913
- Xylocopa maesoi Dusmet y Alonso, 1924
- Xylocopa magnifica (Cockerell, 1929)
- Xylocopa maidli Maa, 1940
- Xylocopa maior Maidl, 1912
- Xylocopa marginella Lepeletier, 1841
- Xylocopa mastrucata Pérez, 1901
- Xylocopa maya Mérida, Hinojosa-Díaz, & Ayala, 2022
- Xylocopa mazarredoi Dusmet y Alonso, 1924
- Xylocopa mcgregori Cockerell, 1920
- Xylocopa mckeani (Cockerell, 1929)
- Xylocopa meadewaldoi Hurd, 1959
- Xylocopa mendozana Enderlein, 1913
- Xylocopa merceti Dusmet y Alonso, 1924
- Xylocopa metallica Smith, 1874
- Xylocopa mexicanorum Cockerell, 1912
- Xylocopa meyeri Dusmet y Alonso, 1924
- Xylocopa micans Lepeletier, 1841
- Xylocopa micheneri Hurd, 1978
- Xylocopa mimetica Cockerell, 1915
- Xylocopa minor Maidl, 1912
- Xylocopa mirabilis Hurd & Moure, 1963
- Xylocopa mixta Radoszkowski, 1881
- Xylocopa modesta Smith, 1854
- Xylocopa mohnikei Cockerell, 1907
- Xylocopa montana Enderlein, 1903
- Xylocopa mordax Smith, 1874
- Xylocopa morotaiana Lieftinck, 1956
- Xylocopa muscaria (Fabricius, 1775)
- Xylocopa myops Ritsema, 1876
- Xylocopa nasalis Westwood, 1842
- Xylocopa nasica Pérez, 1901
- Xylocopa nautlana Cockerell, 1904
- Xylocopa negligenda Maa, 1939
- Xylocopa nigrella Hurd, 1959
- Xylocopa nigrescens Friese, 1901
- Xylocopa nigricans Vachal, 1910
- Xylocopa nigricaula (LeVeque, 1928)
- Xylocopa nigripes Friese, 1915
- Xylocopa nigrita (Fabricius, 1775)
- Xylocopa nigrocaerulea Smith, 1874
- Xylocopa nigrocaudata Pérez, 1901
- Xylocopa nigrocincta Smith, 1854
- Xylocopa nigroclypeata Rayment, 1935
- Xylocopa nigroplagiata Ritsema, 1876
- Xylocopa nigrotarsata Maa, 1938
- Xylocopa nobilis Smith, 1859
- Xylocopa nogueirai Hurd & Moure, 1960
- Xylocopa nyassica Enderlein, 1903
- Xylocopa oblonga Smith, 1874
- Xylocopa obscurata Smith, 1854
- Xylocopa obscuritarsis Friese, 1922
- Xylocopa occipitalis Pérez, 1901
- Xylocopa ocellaris Pérez, 1901
- Xylocopa ocularis Pérez, 1901
- Xylocopa ogasawarensis Matsumura, 1932
- Xylocopa olivacea (Fabricius, 1778)
- Xylocopa ordinaria Smith, 1874
- Xylocopa ornata Smith, 1874
- Xylocopa orthogonaspis Moure, 2003
- Xylocopa orthosiphonis (Cockerell, 1908)
- Xylocopa pallidiscopa Hurd, 1961
- Xylocopa parvula Rayment, 1935
- Xylocopa perforator Smith, 1861
- Xylocopa perkinsi Cameron, 1901
- Xylocopa perpunctata (LeVeque, 1928)
- Xylocopa peruana Pérez, 1901
- Xylocopa perversa Wiedemann, 1824
- Xylocopa pervirescens Cockerell, 1931
- Xylocopa phalothorax Lepeletier, 1841
- Xylocopa philippinensis Smith, 1854
- Xylocopa pilosa Friese, 1922
- Xylocopa plagioxantha Lieftinck, 1964
- Xylocopa praeusta Smith, 1854
- Xylocopa prashadi Maa, 1938
- Xylocopa preussi Enderlein, 1903
- Xylocopa provida Smith, 1863
- Xylocopa proximata Maa, 1938
- Xylocopa pseudoleucothorax Maidl, 1912
- Xylocopa pseudoviolacea Popov, 1947
- Xylocopa pubescens Spinola, 1838
- Xylocopa pulchra Smith, 1874
- Xylocopa punctifrons Cockerell, 1917
- Xylocopa punctigena Maa, 1938
- Xylocopa punctilabris Morawitz, 1894
- Xylocopa pusulata Vachal, 1910
- Xylocopa ramakrishnai Maa, 1938
- Xylocopa rejecta Vachal, 1910
- Xylocopa remota Maa, 1938
- Xylocopa rogenhoferi Friese, 1900
- Xylocopa romeroi Villamizar, Fernández, & Vivallo, 2020
- Xylocopa rotundiceps Smith, 1874
- Xylocopa ruficeps Friese, 1910
- Xylocopa ruficollis Hurd & Moure, 1963
- Xylocopa ruficornis Fabricius, 1804
- Xylocopa rufidorsum Enderlein, 1913
- Xylocopa rufipes Smith, 1852
- Xylocopa rufitarsis Lepeletier, 1841
- Xylocopa rutilans Lieftinck, 1957
- Xylocopa samarensis (Cockerell & LeVeque, 1925)
- Xylocopa sarawatica Engel, 2017
- Xylocopa schoana Enderlein, 1903
- Xylocopa scioensis Gribodo, 1884
- Xylocopa senex Friese, 1909
- Xylocopa senior Vachal, 1899
- Xylocopa shelfordi Cameron, 1902
- Xylocopa sicheli Vachal, 1898
- Xylocopa signata Morawitz, 1875
- Xylocopa similis Smith, 1874
- Xylocopa simillima Smith, 1854
- Xylocopa sinensis (Wu, 1983)
- Xylocopa sinensis Smith, 1854
- Xylocopa smithii Ritsema, 1876
- Xylocopa sogdiana Popov & Ponomareva, 1961
- Xylocopa somalica Magretti, 1895
- Xylocopa sonorina Smith, 1874
- Xylocopa sphinx Vachal, 1899
- Xylocopa splendidula Lepeletier, 1841
- Xylocopa stadelmanni Vachal, 1899
- Xylocopa stanleyi (LeVeque, 1928)
- Xylocopa steindachneri Maidl, 1912
- Xylocopa strandi Dusmet y Alonso, 1924
- Xylocopa subcombusta (LeVeque, 1928)
- Xylocopa subcyanea Pérez, 1901
- Xylocopa subjuncta Vachal, 1898
- Xylocopa subvirescens Cresson, 1879
- Xylocopa subvolatilis (Cockerell, 1918)
- Xylocopa subzonata Moure, 1949
- Xylocopa sulcatipes Maa, 1970
- Xylocopa sulcifrons Pérez, 1901
- Xylocopa suspecta Moure & Camargo, 1988
- Xylocopa suspiciosa Vachal, 1899
- Xylocopa sycophanta Pérez, 1901
- Xylocopa tabaniformis Smith, 1854
- Xylocopa tacanensis Moure, 1949
- Xylocopa tambelanensis (Cockerell, 1926)
- Xylocopa tanganyikae Strand, 1911
- Xylocopa tayabanica Cockerell, 1930
- Xylocopa tegulata Friese, 1911
- Xylocopa tenkeana Cockerell, 1933
- Xylocopa tenuata Smith, 1874
- Xylocopa tenuiscapa Westwood, 1840
- Xylocopa teredo Guilding, 1825
- Xylocopa tesselata Maa, 1970
- Xylocopa thoracica Friese, 1903
- Xylocopa togoensis Enderlein, 1903
- Xylocopa torrida (Westwood, 1838)
- Xylocopa tranquebarica (Fabricius, 1804)
- Xylocopa tranquebarorum (Swederus, 1787)
- Xylocopa transitoria Pérez, 1901
- Xylocopa tricolor Ritsema, 1876
- Xylocopa trifasciata Gribodo, 1891
- Xylocopa trochanterica Vachal, 1910
- Xylocopa truxali Hurd & Moure, 1963
- Xylocopa tumida Friese, 1903
- Xylocopa tumorifera Lieftinck, 1957
- Xylocopa turanica Morawitz, 1875
- Xylocopa uclesiensis Pérez, 1901
- Xylocopa unicolor Smith, 1861
- Xylocopa ustulata Smith, 1854
- Xylocopa vachali Pérez, 1901
- Xylocopa valga Gerstäcker, 1872
- Xylocopa varentzowi Morawitz, 1895
- Xylocopa varians Smith, 1874
- Xylocopa varipes Smith, 1854
- Xylocopa velutina Lieftinck, 1957
- Xylocopa vestita Hurd & Moure, 1963
- Xylocopa villosa Friese, 1909
- Xylocopa violacea (Linnaeus, 1758)
- Xylocopa virginica (Linnaeus, 1771)
- Xylocopa viridigastra Lepeletier, 1841
- Xylocopa viridis Smith, 1854
- Xylocopa vittata Enderlein, 1903
- Xylocopa vogtiana Enderlein, 1913
- Xylocopa volatilis Smith, 1861
- Xylocopa vulpina Alfken, 1930
- Xylocopa waterhousei Leys, 2000
- Xylocopa watmoughi Eardley, 1983
- Xylocopa wellmani Cockerell, 1906
- Xylocopa wilmattae Cockerell, 1912
- Xylocopa xanti Mocsáry, 1883
- Xylocopa yunnanensis Wu, 1982

Subgenus Proxylocopa

- Xylocopa altaica (Popov, 1947)
- Xylocopa andarabana Hedicke, 1938
- Xylocopa hedickei
- Xylocopa mongolicus (Wu, 1983)
- Xylocopa nitidiventris Smith, 1878
- Xylocopa nix (Maa, 1954)
- Xylocopa olivieri Lepeletier, 1841
- Xylocopa parviceps Morawitz, 1895
- Xylocopa przewalskyi Morawitz, 1886
- Xylocopa rufa Friese, 1901
- Xylocopa versicolor Alfken, 1930
- Xylocopa wui
- Xylocopa zonata Alfken, 1930

== Gallery ==
X. tranquebarorum flight in slow motion

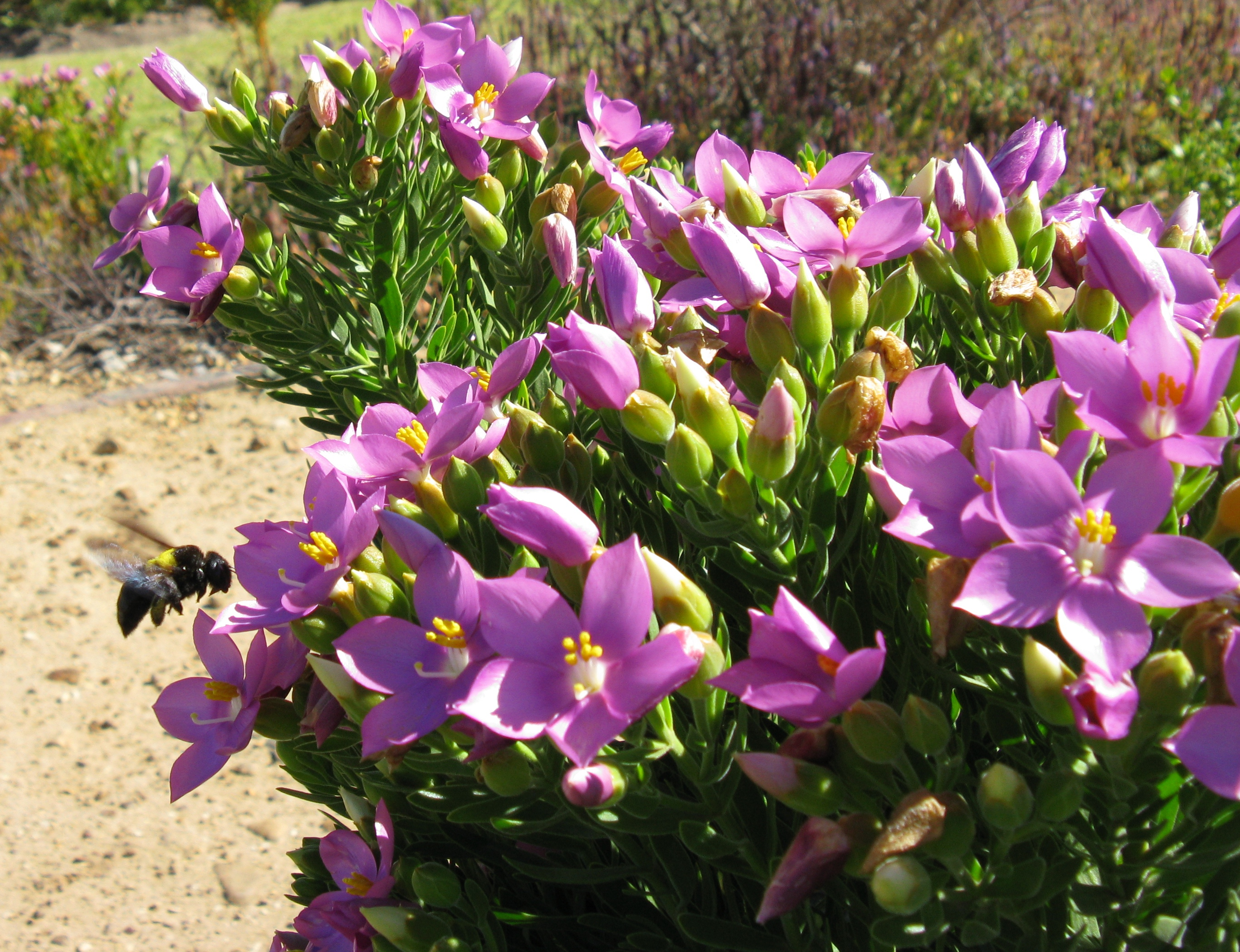
X. caffra female foraging

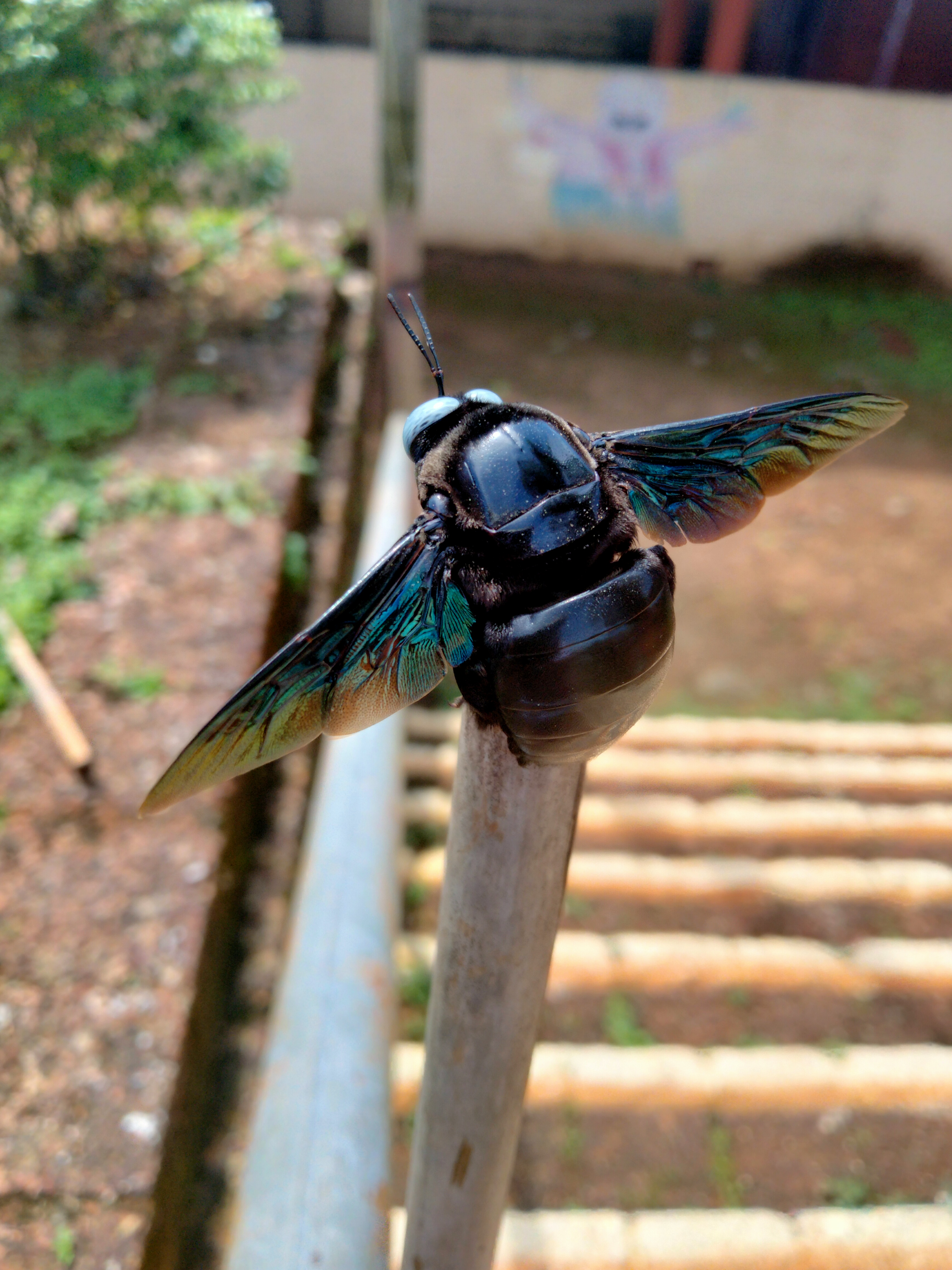
X. tenuiscapa at Kanhangad

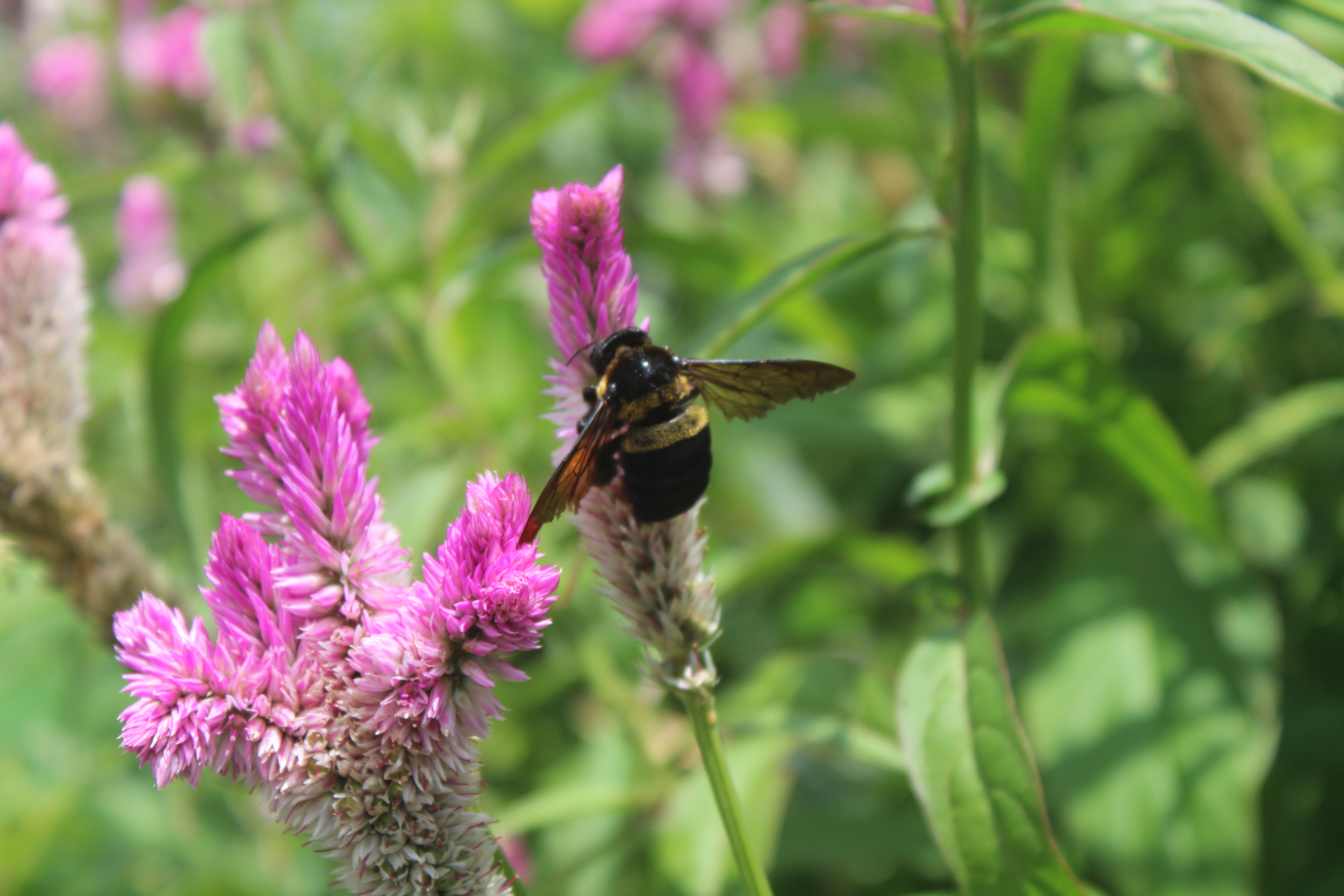
X. ghilianii on Celosia, Albay

X. appendiculata on abelia flowers, Tokyo

Large eyed male mountain carpenter bee hovering

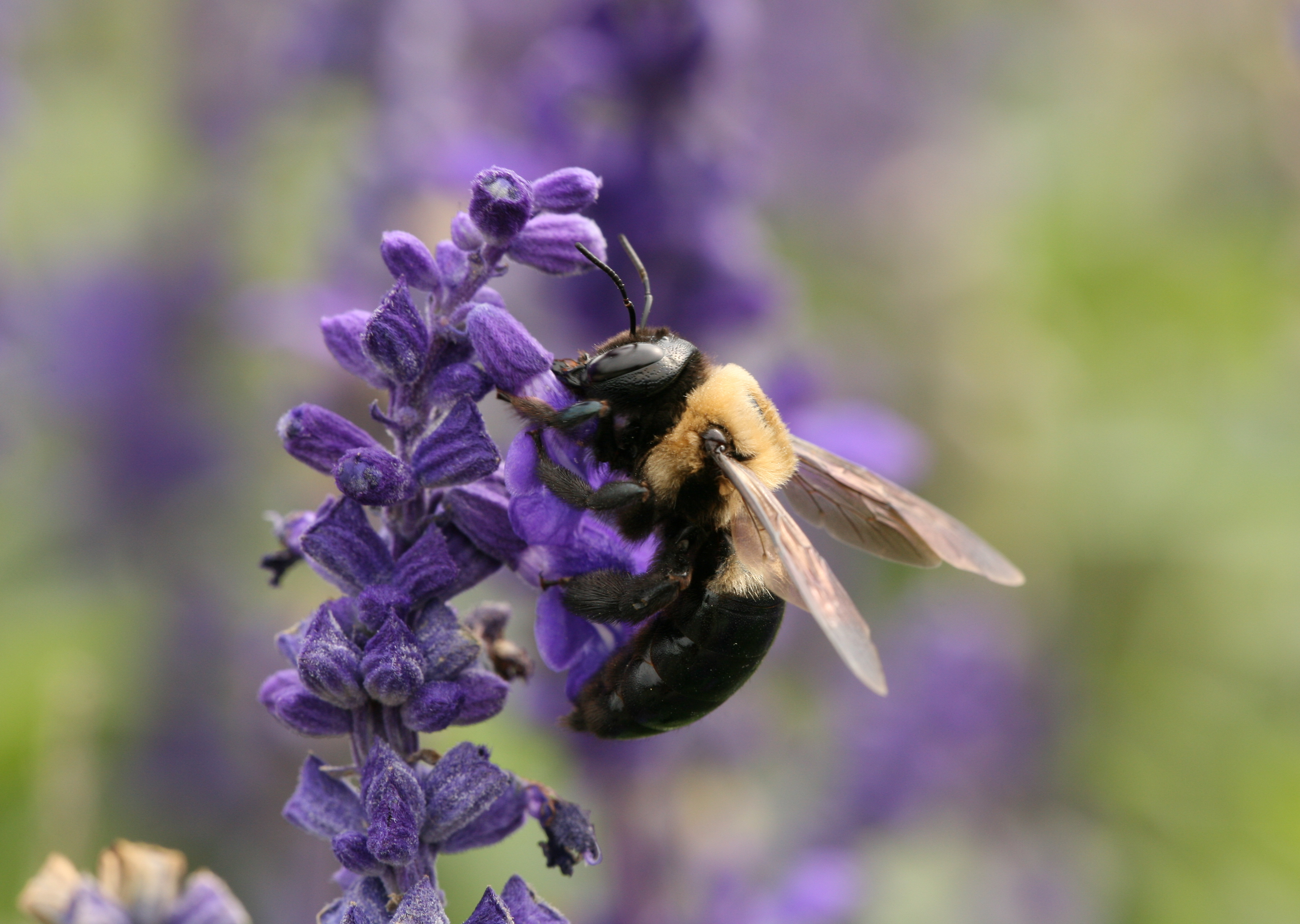
X. virginica in the United States

A female mountain carpenter bee robbing nectar from pineapple sage salvia without providing pollination services. The last scene played at one-fourth speed

Male valley carpenter bee on Coreopsis
