= Xylocopa alticola =

Scientific classification
- Kingdom: Animalia
- Phylum: Arthropoda
- Clade: Pancrustacea
- Class: Insecta
- Order: Hymenoptera
- Family: Apidae
- Genus: Xylocopa
- Species: X. alticola

Binomial name
- Xylocopa alticola Hedicke, 1938

Species of bee

Xylocopa alticola is a species of carpenter bee native to Africa.

The species was described by Hans Hedicke in 1938.

The Smithsonian has specimens collected from Mount Kilimanjaro in Tanzania.
