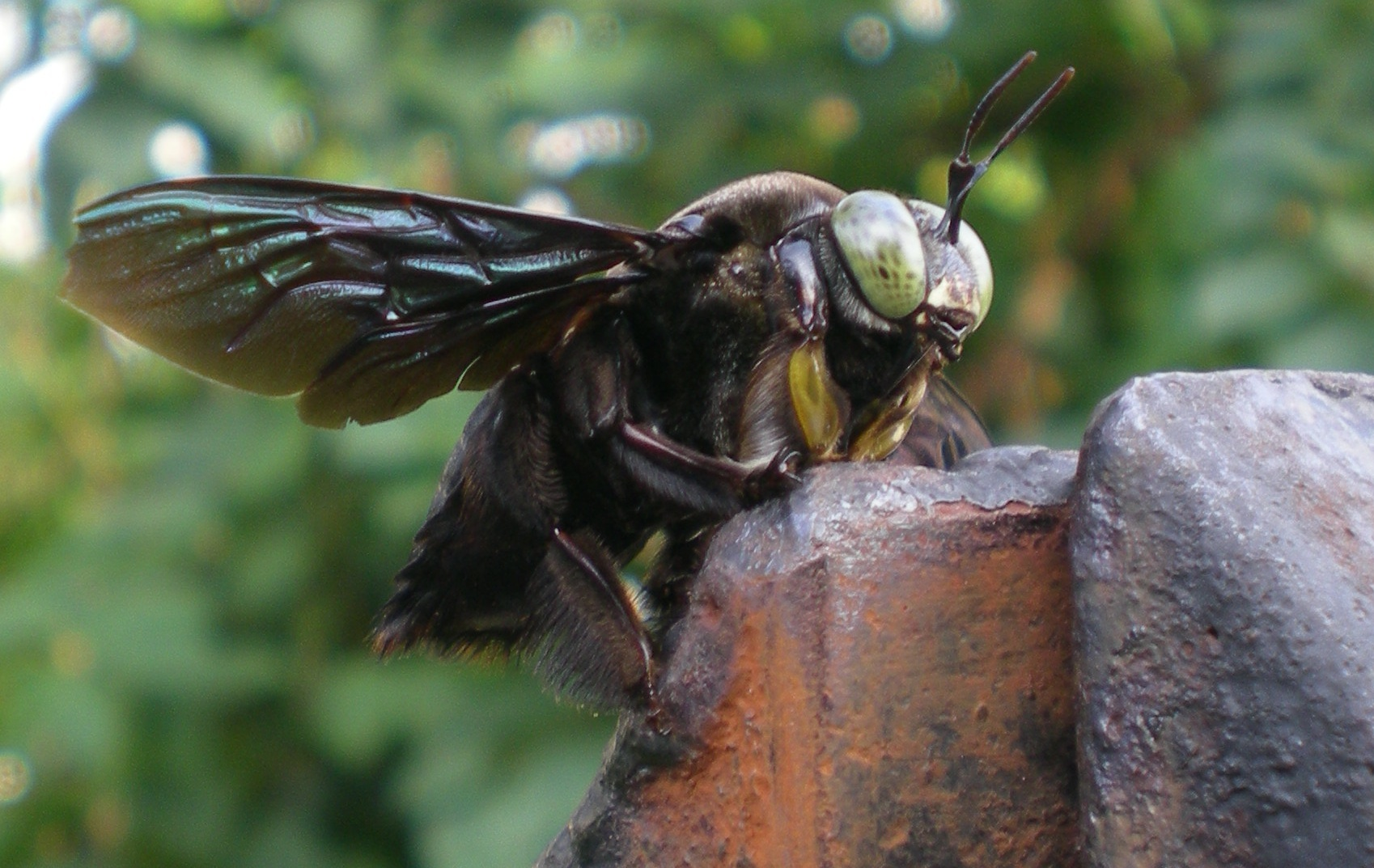
- Kuala Lumpur, Malaysia

Scientific classification
- Domain: Eukaryota
- Kingdom: Animalia
- Phylum: Arthropoda
- Class: Insecta
- Order: Hymenoptera
- Family: Apidae
- Genus: Xylocopa
- Species: X. latipes

Binomial name
- Xylocopa latipes (Drury, 1773)

= Xylocopa latipes =

Species of bee

Xylocopa latipes, the broad-handed carpenter bee, is a species of carpenter bee widely dispersed throughout Southeast Asia. This bee inhabits forests and constructs nests by burrowing into wood. It often makes long deep tunnels in wooden rafters, fallen trees, telephone poles, etc., but is not found in living trees.

It was first described by the English entomologist, Dru Drury in 1773, and is a member of the group of carpenter bees (Family Apidae).

The broad-handed carpenter bee is a very large, robust, solitary bee. It is shiny, fully black in colour with fuscous metallic blue-green or purple wings in sunlight. The broad-handed carpenter bee is among the largest Xylocopa known and among the largest bees of the world (though it is not the world's largest, that title belongs to another Southeast Asian bee, the Indonesian Megachile pluto). It has a loud and distinctive, low-pitched buzzing that can be heard as it flies between flowers or perches. In urban areas, these bees can become attached to certain perches, returning to them day after day, even after several generations.

== Mating ==
Carpenter bees mate on-the-wing. Males grasp the females in flight and place their front or middle legs, which have fringes of long setae, over the compound eyes of their mate. It is thought that the dilated front legs of males of some species of carpenter bees collect and trap oils and odours that function during mating.

Xylocopa latipes are considered multivoltine as they can have more than two generations per year but this depends on the availability of floral resources in their habitat.

== Nesting ==
In Malaysia, broad-handed carpenter bees often choose useful structural woods as nesting sites, as they are able to burrow through it with their powerful mandibles. Broad-handed carpenter bees construct multiple galleries (3 - 5) of about 11 cm in length and 2.1 - 2.3 cm in diameter.

Broad-handed carpenter bees choose dead wood, pithy stems and bamboo culms for nesting. Preferred wood species for the broad-handed carpenter bee include, Syzygium cumini, Cassia siamea, Dyera costulata (jelutong), Agathis alba (damar minyak), Alstonia spp. (pulai), and Shorea spp. (light-red meranti). They tend to avoid nyatoh, kapur, kempas, and mengkulang (local names for native trees of Malaysia).

== Role in Pollination ==
Carpenter bees are used commercially in the Philippines to pollinate passion-fruit flowers. They naturally perform the same function in Indonesia and Malaysia and the rest of Southeast Asia. In addition, passion-fruit flowers (Passiflora edulis flavicarpa) have been found to bloom in synchrony with carpenter bee foraging rhythms, indicating an evolving relationship.
