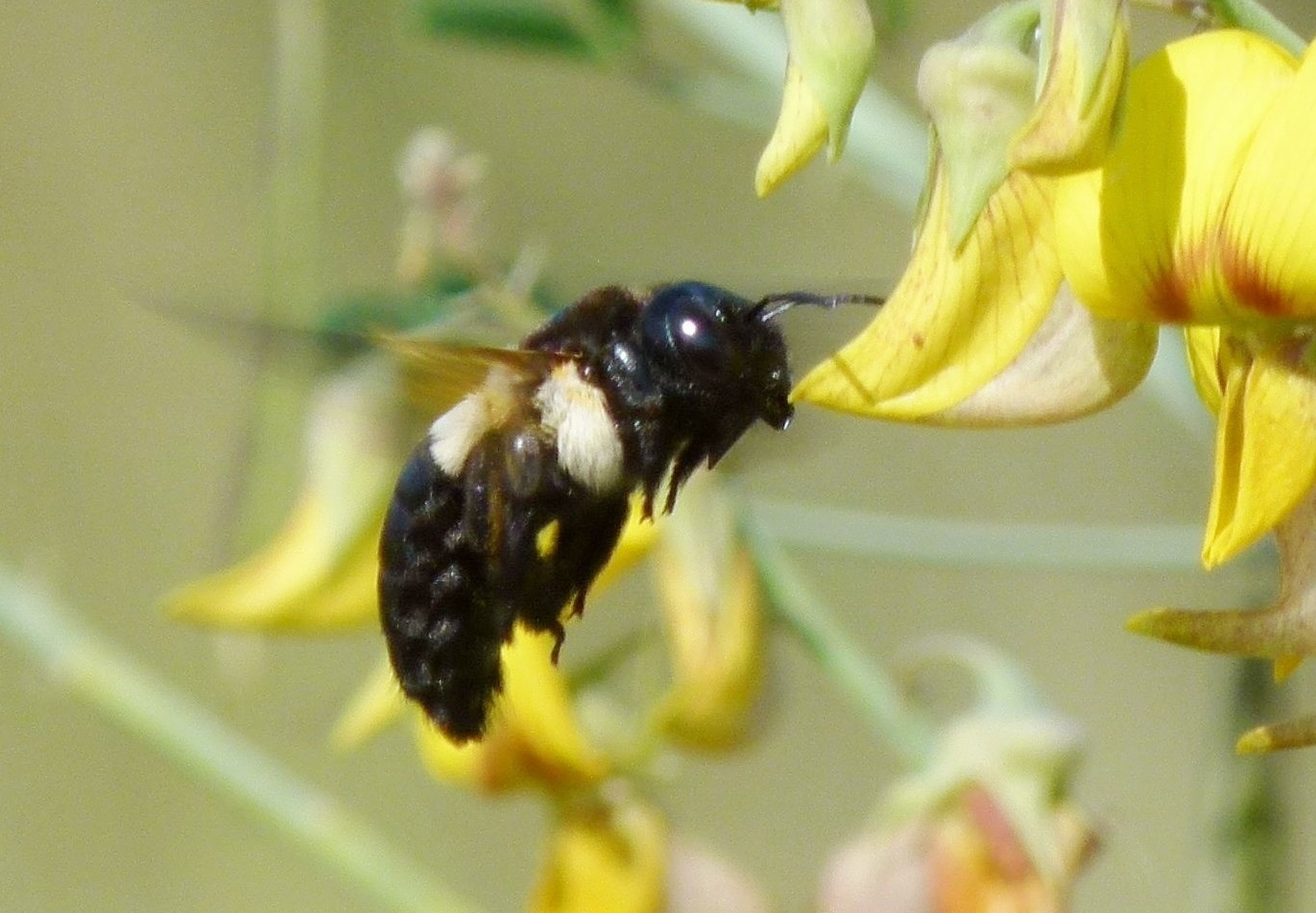
- X. inconstans female in the Kruger NP

Scientific classification
- Kingdom: Animalia
- Phylum: Arthropoda
- Class: Insecta
- Order: Hymenoptera
- Family: Apidae
- Genus: Xylocopa
- Species: X. inconstans

Binomial name
- Xylocopa inconstans Smith, 1874

Synonyms
- Xylocopa abyssinica Radoszkowski 1876; Xylocopa inconstans var. flavescens Vachal 1899.

= Xylocopa inconstans =

Species of bee

Xylocopa inconstans is a species of carpenter bee.

== Description ==
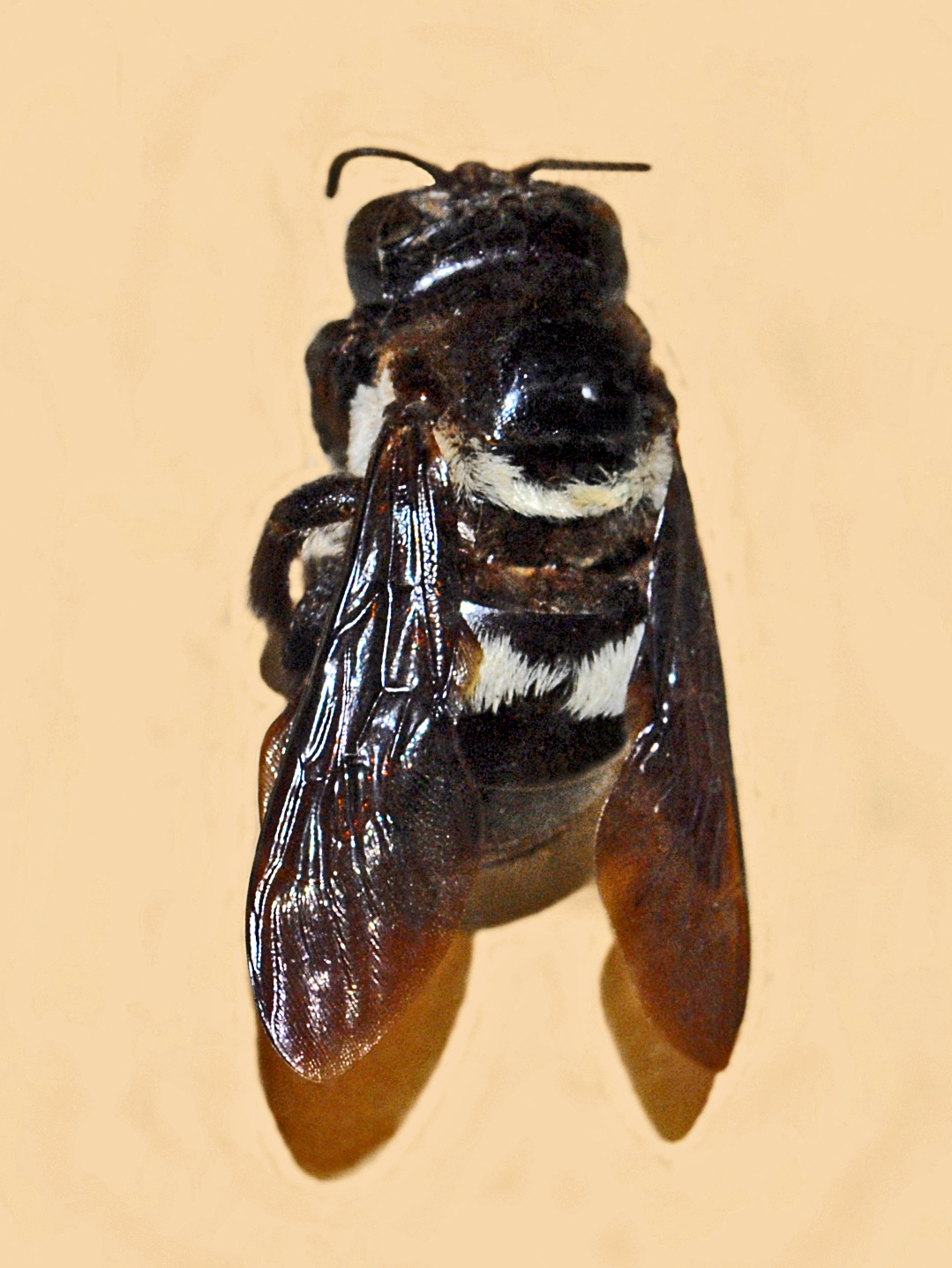
A Xylocopa inconstans specimen from Eritrea

Xylocopa inconstans can reach a length of about 20–26 millimetres (0.79–1.02 in). The scutellum has a right angle. The back side of the mesosoma and the first tergite show a white pubescence.

== Distribution ==
This species can be found in Senegal, Burkina-Faso, Togo, Cameroon, RCongo, DRCongo, Sudan, Somalia, Ethiopia, Kenya, Tanzania, Mozambique, Malawi, Zimbabwe, Angola, Botswana, Namibia and South Africa.
