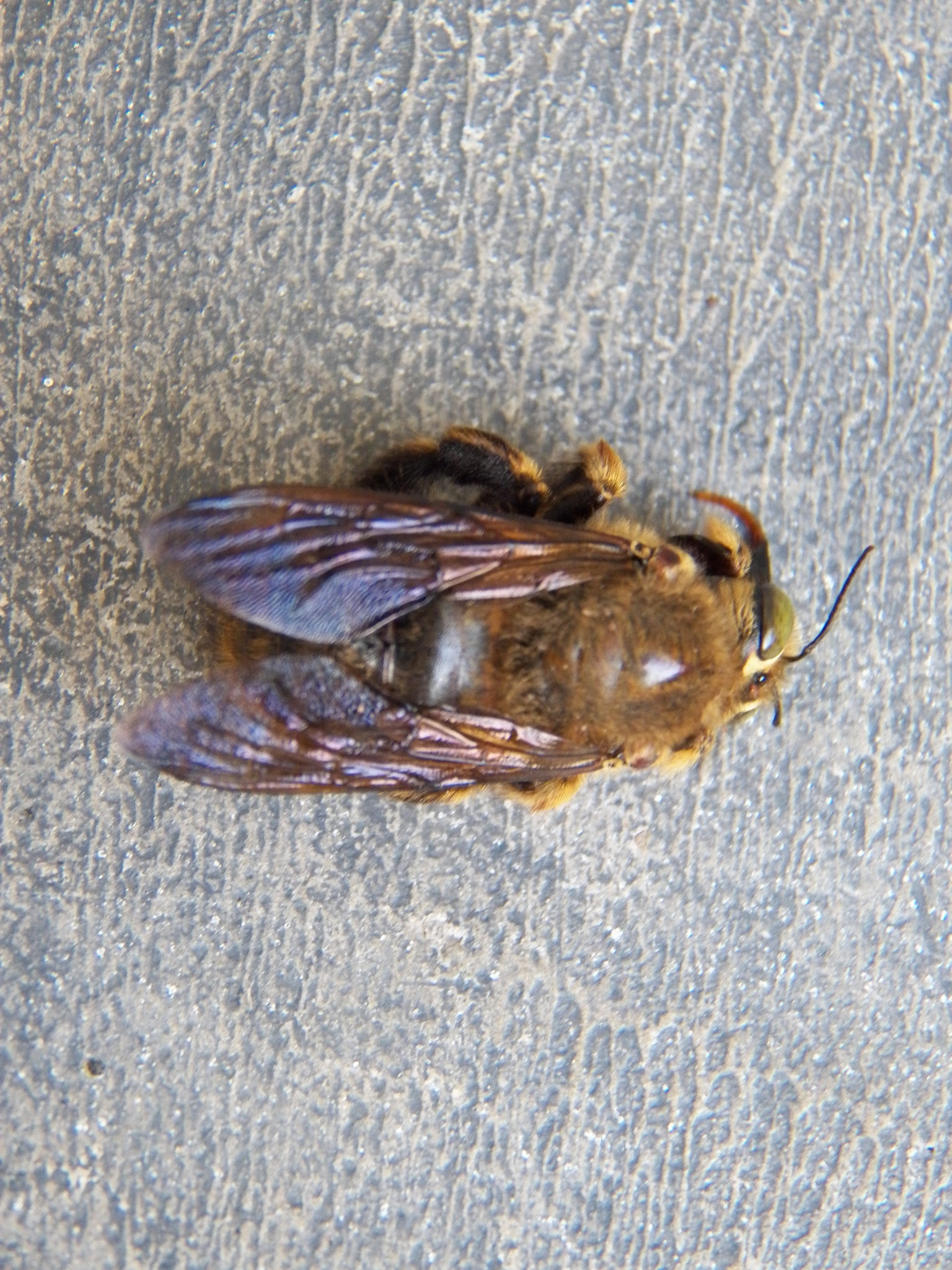

Scientific classification
- Domain: Eukaryota
- Kingdom: Animalia
- Phylum: Arthropoda
- Class: Insecta
- Order: Hymenoptera
- Family: Apidae
- Genus: Xylocopa
- Species: X. strandi

Binomial name
- Xylocopa strandi Dusmet & Alonso, 1924

= Xylocopa strandi =

Species of bee

Xylocopa strandi is a species of carpenter bee in the family Apidae. It is found in Central America and North America.
