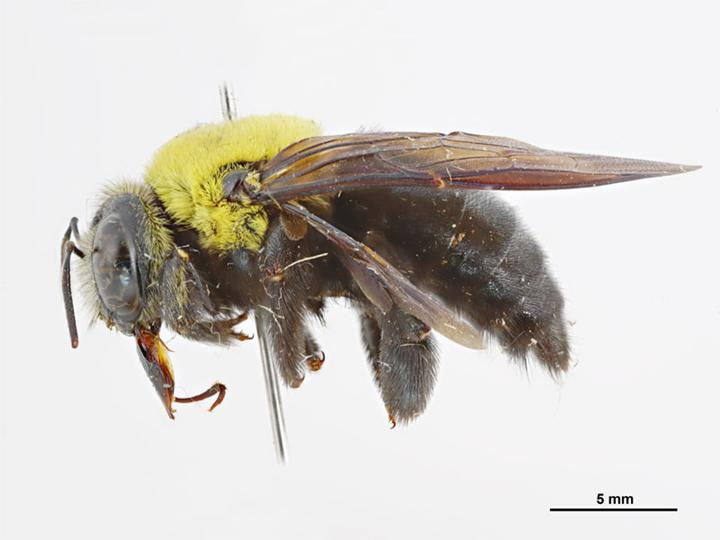
- Female

Scientific classification
- Kingdom: Animalia
- Phylum: Arthropoda
- Clade: Pancrustacea
- Class: Insecta
- Order: Hymenoptera
- Family: Apidae
- Genus: Xylocopa
- Species: X. disconota

Binomial name
- Xylocopa disconota Friese, 1914

= Xylocopa disconota =

Species of bee

Xylocopa disconota or Xylocopa (Koptortosoma) disconota is a species of carpenter bee. It is endemic to Australia. It was described in 1914 by German entomologist Heinrich Friese.

== Description ==
The body length is 17–19 mm; wing length 14–17 mm.

== Distribution and habitat ==
The species occurs along the north-east coast of Far North Queensland, including the Cape York Peninsula. The holotype was collected at Redlynch, Cairns. Associated habitats include open forest and shrubland, as well as agricultural land and gardens.

== Behaviour ==
The adults are flying mellivores. Flowering plants visited by the bees include Melastoma, Crotalaria and Scaevola species.

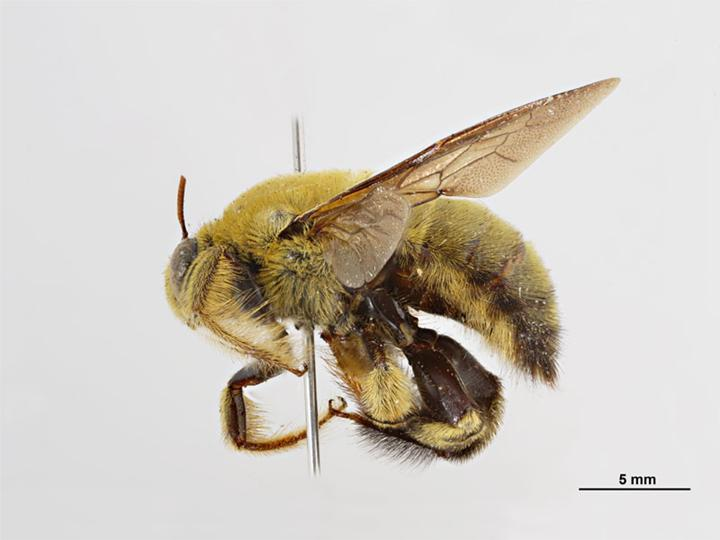
Male
