= Xylocopa mexicanorum =

Scientific classification
- Kingdom: Animalia
- Phylum: Arthropoda
- Class: Insecta
- Order: Hymenoptera
- Family: Apidae
- Genus: Xylocopa
- Species: X. mexicanorum

Binomial name
- Xylocopa mexicanorum Cockerell, 1912

Species of bee

Xylocopa mexicanorum is a species of carpenter bee in the family Apidae. It is found in Central America and North America.
