= Xylocopa tranquebarica =

Xylocopa tranquibarica

Scientific classification
- Kingdom: Animalia
- Phylum: Arthropoda
- Class: Insecta
- Order: Hymenoptera
- Family: Apidae
- Genus: Xylocopa
- Species: X. tranquebarica

Binomial name
- Xylocopa tranquebarica (Fabricius, 1804)

Synonyms
- Bombus tranquebaricus Fabricius, 1804; Xylocopa rufescens Smith, 1874

Species of bee

Xylocopa tranquebarica, or Xylocopa (Nyctomelitta) tranquibarica, is a species of carpenter bee. It is found only in South Asian and Southeast Asian countries. It is a nocturnal bee.
