= Xylocopa ruficornis =

Scientific classification
- Kingdom: Animalia
- Phylum: Arthropoda
- Class: Insecta
- Order: Hymenoptera
- Family: Apidae
- Genus: Xylocopa
- Species: X. ruficornis

Binomial name
- Xylocopa ruficornis Fabricius, 1804

Synonyms
- Xylocopa verticalis Lepeletier, 1841; Xylocopa ceylonica Cameron, 1901; Xylocopa clavicrus Maidl, 1912; Xylocopa (Orbitella_homonym) ceylonica Cameron, 1901; Xylocopa (Maiella) ceylonica Cameron, 1901; Xylocopa (Orbitella_homonym) ruficornis Fabricius, 1804; Xylocopa (Maiella) ruficornis Fabricius, 1804

Species of bee

Xylocopa ruficornis, or Xylocopa (Koptortosoma) ruficornis, is a species of carpenter bee. It is found in Sri Lanka.
