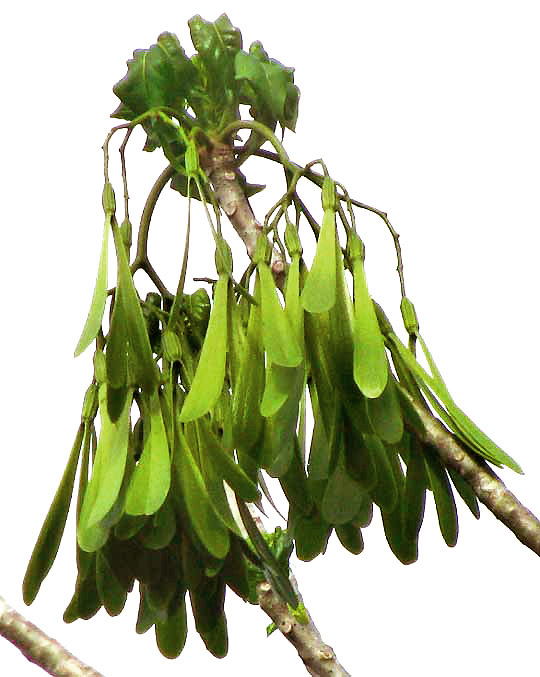
- Gyrocarpus jatrophifolius, immature fruits & emerging leaves

Conservation status
- Least Concern (IUCN 3.1)

Scientific classification
- Kingdom: Plantae
- Clade: Embryophytes
- Clade: Tracheophytes
- Clade: Angiosperms
- Clade: Magnoliids
- Order: Laurales
- Family: Hernandiaceae
- Genus: Gyrocarpus
- Species: G. jatrophifolius

Binomial name
- Gyrocarpus jatrophifolius Domin, 1925

= Gyrocarpus jatrophifolius =

Species of flowering plant

Gyrocarpus jatrophifolius, sometimes sharing the name helicopter tree with several other trees with winged fruits which spin in the wind, belongs to the relatively small family, the Hernandiaceae.

== Description ==
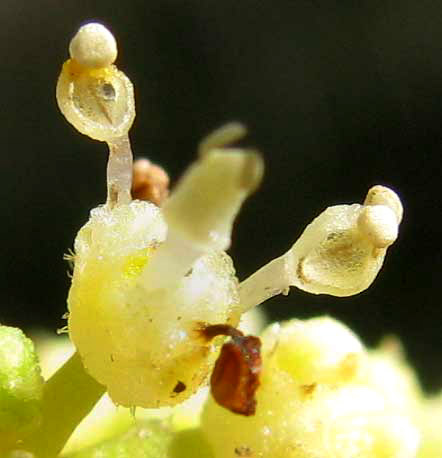
Gyrocarpus jatrophifolius, flower showing the stamens' valvular anthers

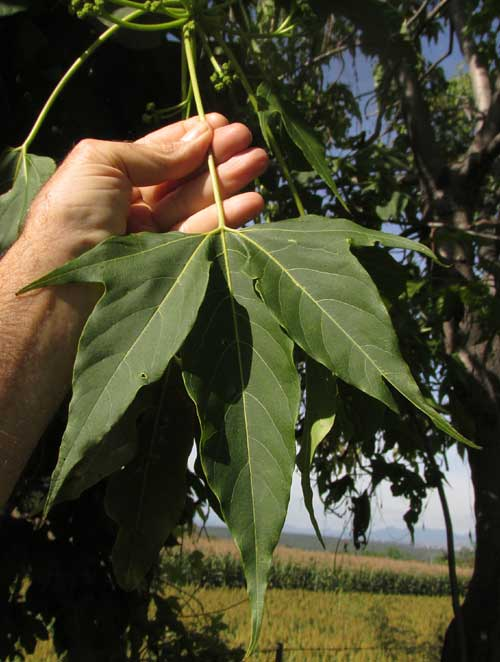
Gyrocarpus jatrophifolius, leaf

Gyrocarpus jatrophifolius is a relatively understudied species belonging to a genus of only five species. In evolutionary terms, the family is regarded as "ancient." This may account for the species displaying this unusual combination of features:

- During the dry season when the trees are leafless, numerous tiny, green to yellowish-green flowers are arrayed in dense, panicle-type inflorescences arising near the tips of branches.
- Flowers may be either male with no female parts, so that they are sterile, or else bear parts of both sexes, thus producing fruits; the species is "andromonoecious."
- The 5 stamens' anthers release pollen through pores over which circular, door-like "valves" open when pollen release is favorable.
- The flowers' 7-8 tepals are only about 0.5 mm long (~ 1/50 inch).
- At the base of the flower's style there's a single staminode, also about 0.5 mm tall, with a minutely granular surface.
- Fruits, dangling in clusters, each bear two downward-pointing, winglike appendages which are a pair of tepals enlarging up to 12.5 cm long, and up to 2.4 cm wide near their tips.
- Leaves, clustered at ends of branches have long petioles up to 42.5 cm long (~17 inches) and blades deeply 3-5 lobed, handlike in shape, and up to 45 cm (~18 inches) in both width and length.

== Distribution ==
Gyrocarpus jatrophifolius occurs from southern Mexico south through Central America into Costa Rica.

== Habitat ==
Gyrocarpus jatrophifolius occurs in tropical forests with extended dry seasons.

== Traditional uses ==
In the Mexican state of Veracruz, Gyrocarpus jatrophifolius is used for building living fences. In Michoacán it is used in the manufacture of watering troughs, canoes, yokes, wooden spoons, guitars and vihuelas.

== Taxonomy ==
In 1925, Karel Domin described Gyrocarpus jatrophifolius from collections from Costa Rica. Later it was realized that plants matching the new species were referable to the concept of a very variable Gyrocarpus americanus already described in 1842 by Schlechtendal. Domin's work, on the flora of Australia, appeared in a publication not commonly available abroad. For many years many Mexican and Central American collections of Gyrocarpus jatrophifolius automatically were assumed to be Gyrocarpus americanus. This assumption was further encouraged when in 1943 Standley and Steyermark, in the Flora of Guatemala, erroneously stated that the genus Gyrocarpus was monotypic.

=== Phylogeny ===
Using a chloroplast DNA matrix of 2210 aligned nucleotides, and maximum likelihood inferences, phylogenetic analysis suggests that around 31 million years ago (mya) Gyrocarpus jatrophifolius broke from -- is the sister to -- all other tested Gyrocarpus species. Around 31 mya, during the Oligocene, the earth was experiencing a period of cooling and drying.

== Etymology ==
The genus name Gyrocarpus clearly is derived from the Greek gyros, meaning "turn" (from the rotation of meat on a spit), and the Greek karp(os) meaning "fruit." Thus, a turning or spinning fruit.

The species name jatrophifolius is built upon the genus name Jatropha, species of which may produce leaves similar to those of Gyrocarpus jatrophifolius. The -folius in from the New Latin foliosus meaning "having (such or so many) leaves."

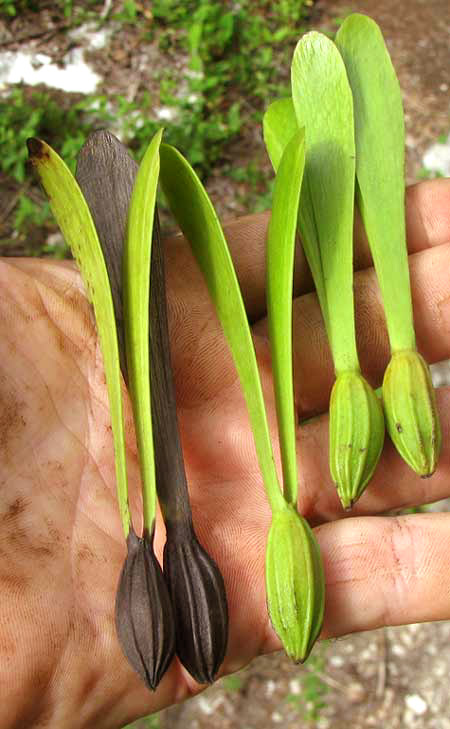
Gyrocarpus jatrophifolius mature fruits

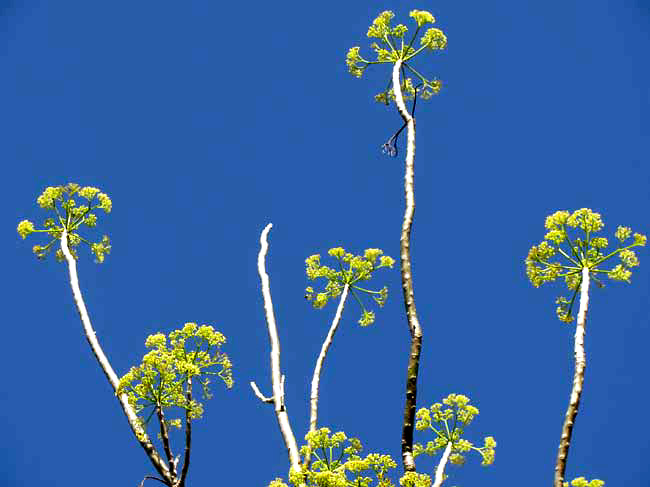
Gyrocarpus jatrophifolius inflorescences on leafless branches

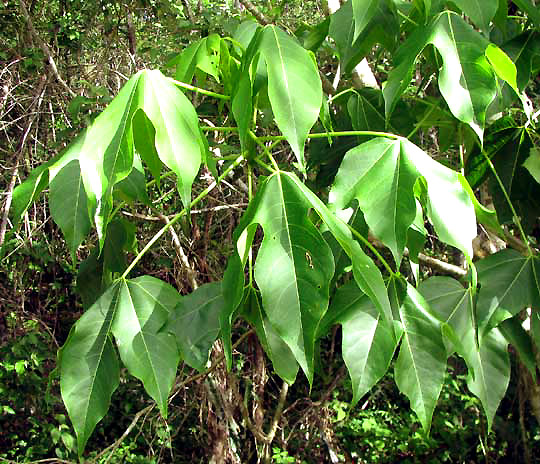
Gyrocarpus jatrophifolius leaves

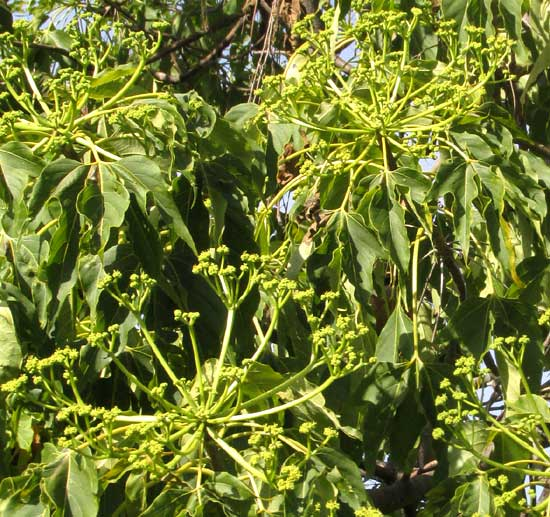
Gyrocarpus jatrophifolius flowering with leaves

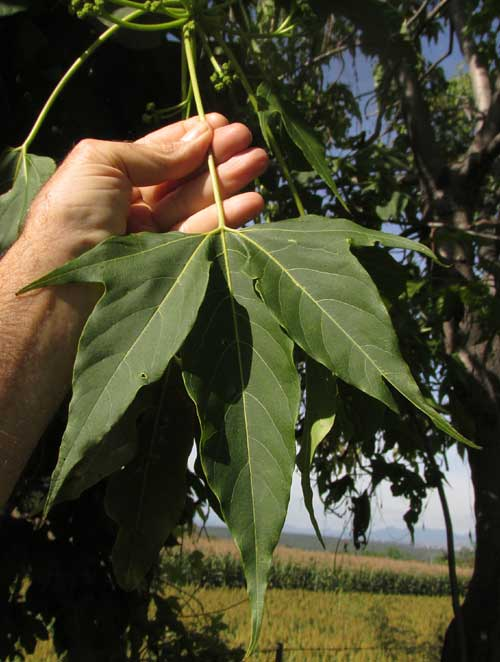
Gyrocarpus jatrophifolius 5-lobed leaf with long petiol
