= G. americanus =

G. americanus may refer to:

- Gavialosuchus americanus, an extinct crocodile species
- Glugea americanus, a fungus species in the genus Glugea
- Gyrocarpus americanus, a tree species in the genus Gyrocarpus

== See also ==
- Americanus (disambiguation)
