= Hernandia ovigera subsp. stokesii =

Conservation status
- Vulnerable (IUCN 2.3)

Scientific classification
- Kingdom: Plantae
- Clade: Embryophytes
- Clade: Tracheophytes
- Clade: Spermatophytes
- Clade: Angiosperms
- Clade: Magnoliids
- Order: Laurales
- Family: Hernandiaceae
- Genus: Hernandia
- Species: H. ovigera
- Subspecies: H. o. subsp. stokesii

Trinomial name
- Hernandia ovigera subsp. stokesii (F.Br.) J.Florence

Synonyms
- Hernandia ovigera var. stokesii F.Br.; Hernandia stokesii (F.Br.) Kubitzki; Hernandia tahitensis J.W.Moore

Species of plant

Hernandia ovigera subsp. stokesii is a subspecies of flowering plant in the Hernandiaceae family. It a tree native to the Pitcairn Islands and the Society Islands and Tubuai Islands of French Polynesia.
