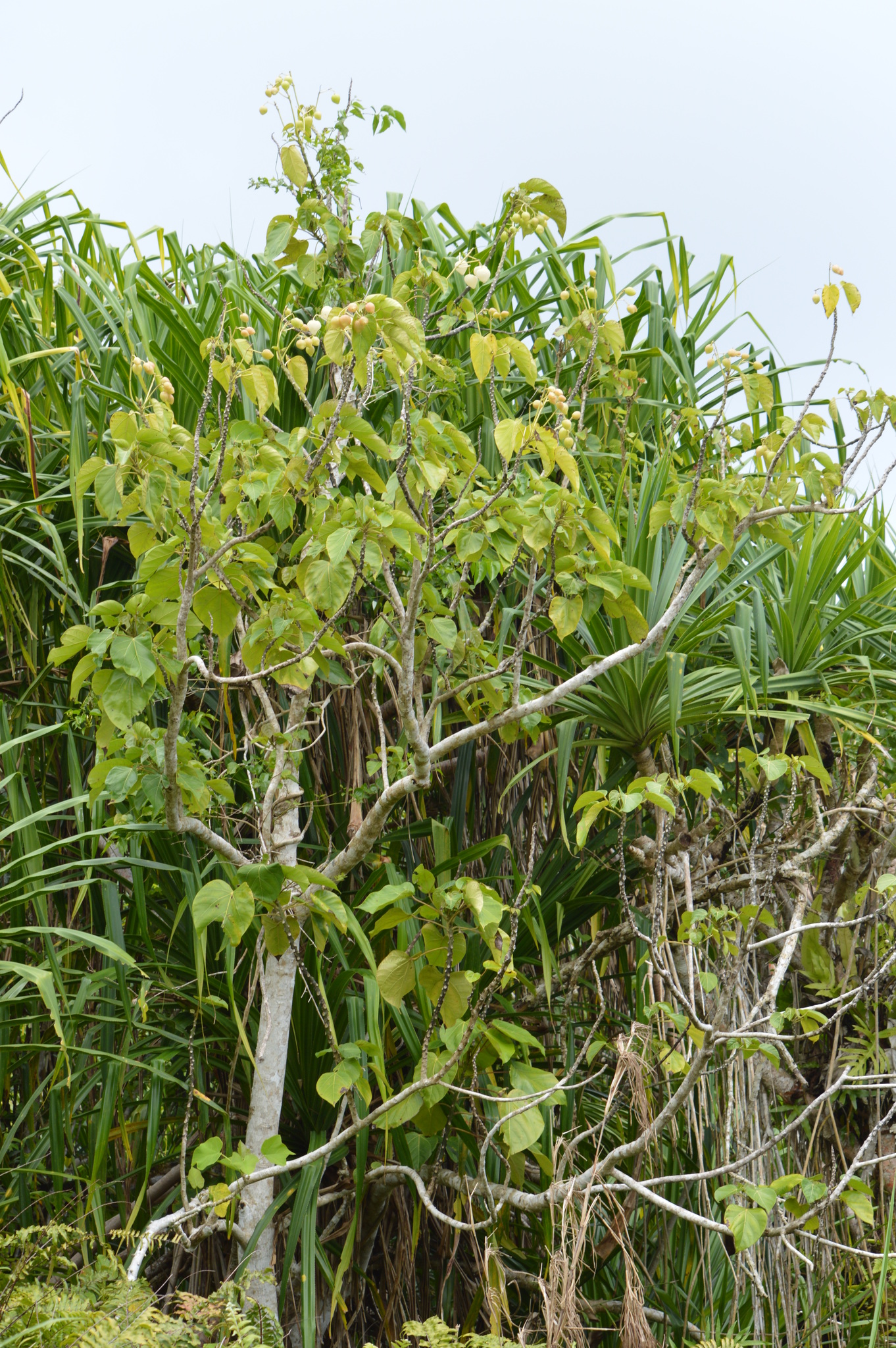
- Oschal tree, Rota, Commonwealth of the Northern Mariana Islands

Scientific classification
- Kingdom: Plantae
- Clade: Embryophytes
- Clade: Tracheophytes
- Clade: Spermatophytes
- Clade: Angiosperms
- Clade: Magnoliids
- Order: Laurales
- Family: Hernandiaceae
- Genus: Hernandia
- Species: H. labyrinthica

Binomial name
- Hernandia labyrinthica Tuyama

= Hernandia labyrinthica =

Species of plant

Hernandia labyrinthica (Carolinian: oschal) is a species of tree in the family Hernandiaceae indigenous to Indonesia, New Guinea, the Solomon Islands, and the islands of Rota and Guam in Micronesia.
