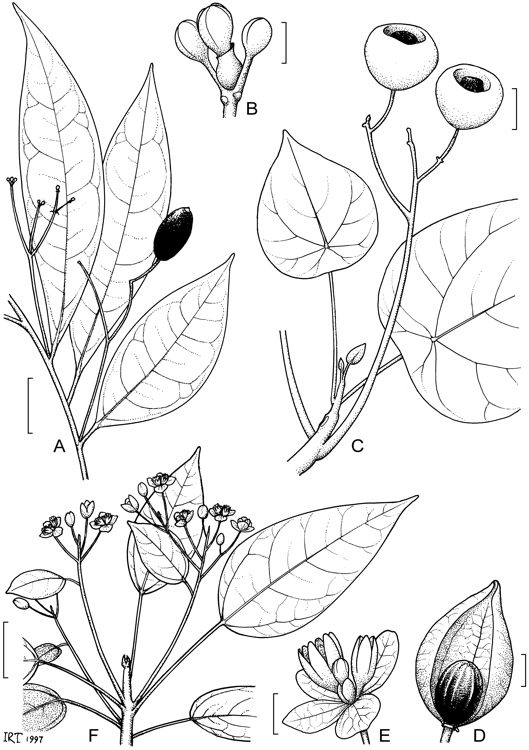
- Botanical illustration

Conservation status
- Least Concern (NCA)

Scientific classification
- Kingdom: Plantae
- Clade: Embryophytes
- Clade: Tracheophytes
- Clade: Spermatophytes
- Clade: Angiosperms
- Clade: Magnoliids
- Order: Laurales
- Family: Hernandiaceae
- Genus: Hernandia
- Species: H. albiflora

Binomial name
- Hernandia albiflora C.T.White

Synonyms
- Valvanthera albiflora C.T.White

= Hernandia albiflora =

Species of flowering plant

Hernandia albiflora is a species of plant in the family Hernandiaceae, native to the Wet Tropics bioregion of Queensland, Australia. It is an understory tree of rainforest, first described in 1969.

== Description ==
Hernandia albiflora is a large shrub or small tree which may grow to about 15 m (49 ft) tall. The ovate leaves grow to about 16 cm (6.3 in) long and 6 cm (2.4 in) wide. Small white flowers are produced in a panicle about 6 cm (2.4 in) long. The fruit is a drupe up to 32 mm (1.3 in) long and 14 mm (0.55 in) wide.

== Distribution and habitat ==
It grows in well-developed rainforest from about Rossville to about Tully, at altitudes from sea level to about 450 m (1,480 ft).

== Conservation ==
This species is listed as least concern under the Queensland Government's Nature Conservation Act.
