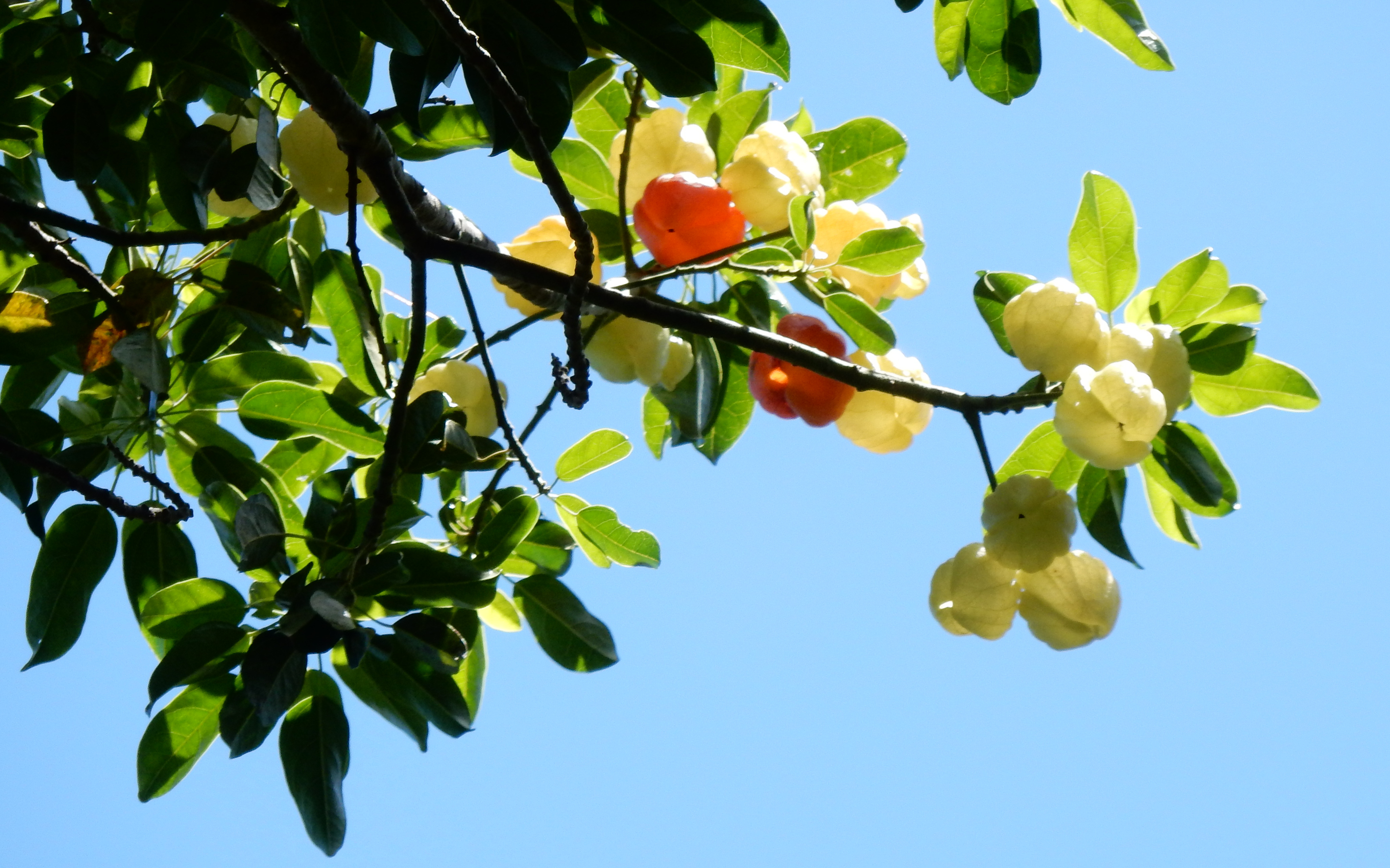
- Royal Botanic Gardens, Sydney

Conservation status
- Near Threatened (NCA)

Scientific classification
- Kingdom: Plantae
- Clade: Embryophytes
- Clade: Tracheophytes
- Clade: Spermatophytes
- Clade: Angiosperms
- Clade: Magnoliids
- Order: Laurales
- Family: Hernandiaceae
- Genus: Hernandia
- Species: H. bivalvis

Binomial name
- Hernandia bivalvis Benth.

= Hernandia bivalvis =

Grease nut

Species of plant

Hernandia bivalvis, known variously as the grease nut and cudgerie, is a species of plant in the family Hernandiaceae. It is endemic to Queensland in Australia.
