= Hernandia stenura =

Conservation status
- Least Concern (IUCN 3.1)

Scientific classification
- Kingdom: Plantae
- Clade: Embryophytes
- Clade: Tracheophytes
- Clade: Spermatophytes
- Clade: Angiosperms
- Clade: Magnoliids
- Order: Laurales
- Family: Hernandiaceae
- Genus: Hernandia
- Species: H. stenura

Binomial name
- Hernandia stenura Standl.

Species of flowering plant

Hernandia stenura is a species of flowering plant in the Hernandiaceae family. It is a shrub native to Costa Rica, Colombia, Guatemala, Honduras, Veracruz and southeastern Mexico, Nicaragua, and Panama.
