= Hernandia jamaicensis =

Conservation status
- Near Threatened (IUCN 2.3)

Scientific classification
- Kingdom: Plantae
- Clade: Embryophytes
- Clade: Tracheophytes
- Clade: Spermatophytes
- Clade: Angiosperms
- Clade: Magnoliids
- Order: Laurales
- Family: Hernandiaceae
- Genus: Hernandia
- Species: H. jamaicensis

Binomial name
- Hernandia jamaicensis Britton & Harris

Species of flowering plant

Hernandia jamaicensis is a species of plant in the Hernandiaceae family. It is endemic to Jamaica.
