= Hernandia cubensis =

Conservation status
- Critically Endangered (IUCN 3.1)

Scientific classification
- Kingdom: Plantae
- Clade: Embryophytes
- Clade: Tracheophytes
- Clade: Spermatophytes
- Clade: Angiosperms
- Clade: Magnoliids
- Order: Laurales
- Family: Hernandiaceae
- Genus: Hernandia
- Species: H. cubensis

Binomial name
- Hernandia cubensis Griseb.

Species of flowering plant

Hernandia cubensis is a species of flowering plant in the family Hernandiaceae. It is endemic to Cuba. It is threatened by habitat loss.
