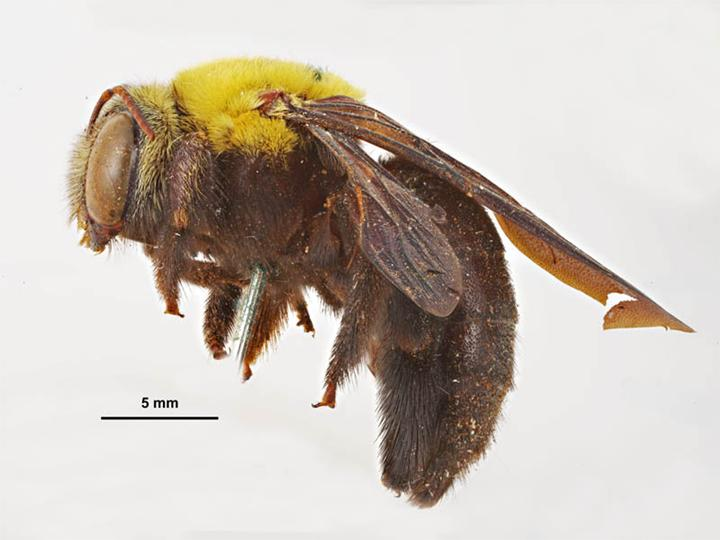
- Female

Scientific classification
- Kingdom: Animalia
- Phylum: Arthropoda
- Clade: Pancrustacea
- Class: Insecta
- Order: Hymenoptera
- Family: Apidae
- Genus: Xylocopa
- Species: X. parvula

Binomial name
- Xylocopa parvula Rayment, 1935

Synonyms
- Xylocopa bryorum parvula Rayment, 1935; Xylocopa (Maiella) wallabia Lieftinck, 1957; Xylocopa (Maiella) xerophila Lieftinck, 1957

= Xylocopa parvula =

Species of bee

Xylocopa parvula or Xylocopa (Koptortosoma) parvula is a species of carpenter bee. It is endemic to Australia. It was described in 1935 by Australian entomologist Tarlton Rayment.

== Description ==
Body length is 18–23 mm; wing length 16–20 mm.

== Distribution and habitat ==
The species occurs widely in Western Australia, the Northern Territory and Queensland. Associated habitats include open forest, shrubland and gardens.

== Behaviour ==
The adults are flying mellivores. Flowering plants visited by the bees include Tecoma, Calytrix, Parkinsonia, Eucalyptus, Solanum, Melaleuca and Grevillea species. Plants used as substrates for nesting burrows include Adansonia, Ficus, Gyrocarpus and Samanea species.
