= Hernandia hammelii =

Conservation status
- Data Deficient (IUCN 2.3)

Scientific classification
- Kingdom: Plantae
- Clade: Embryophytes
- Clade: Tracheophytes
- Clade: Spermatophytes
- Clade: Angiosperms
- Clade: Magnoliids
- Order: Laurales
- Family: Hernandiaceae
- Genus: Hernandia
- Species: H. hammelii

Binomial name
- Hernandia hammelii D'Arcy

Species of flowering plant

Hernandia hammelii is a species of plant in the Hernandiaceae family. It is endemic to Panama. It is threatened by habitat loss.
