= Hernandia didymantha =

Conservation status
- Least Concern (IUCN 3.1)

Scientific classification
- Kingdom: Plantae
- Clade: Embryophytes
- Clade: Tracheophytes
- Clade: Spermatophytes
- Clade: Angiosperms
- Clade: Magnoliids
- Order: Laurales
- Family: Hernandiaceae
- Genus: Hernandia
- Species: H. didymantha

Binomial name
- Hernandia didymantha Donn.Sm.

Species of flowering plant

Hernandia didymantha is a species of flowering plant in the family Hernandiaceae. It is found in Colombia, Costa Rica, Honduras, Nicaragua, and Panama. It is a tree which grows 10 to 25 metres tall, flowers from January to May and November to December, and fruits in March, May to July, and September to November. It grows in lowland and montane rain forests up to 1,600 metres elevation.
