= Hernandia catalpifolia =

Conservation status
- Endangered (IUCN 3.1)

Scientific classification
- Kingdom: Plantae
- Clade: Embryophytes
- Clade: Tracheophytes
- Clade: Spermatophytes
- Clade: Angiosperms
- Clade: Magnoliids
- Order: Laurales
- Family: Hernandiaceae
- Genus: Hernandia
- Species: H. catalpifolia

Binomial name
- Hernandia catalpifolia Britton & Harris

Species of flowering plant

Hernandia catalpifolia is a species of plant in the Hernandiaceae family. It is endemic to Jamaica. It is threatened by habitat loss.
