= Hernandia drakeana =

Conservation status
- Data Deficient (IUCN 3.1)

Scientific classification
- Kingdom: Plantae
- Clade: Embryophytes
- Clade: Tracheophytes
- Clade: Spermatophytes
- Clade: Angiosperms
- Clade: Magnoliids
- Order: Laurales
- Family: Hernandiaceae
- Genus: Hernandia
- Species: H. drakeana

Binomial name
- Hernandia drakeana Nadeaud (1899)

Extinct species of flowering plant

Hernandia drakeana is a species of plant in the Hernandiaceae family. It is endemic to the island of Moorea in the Society Islands of French Polynesia. It was last collected in 1981, and likely extinct.
