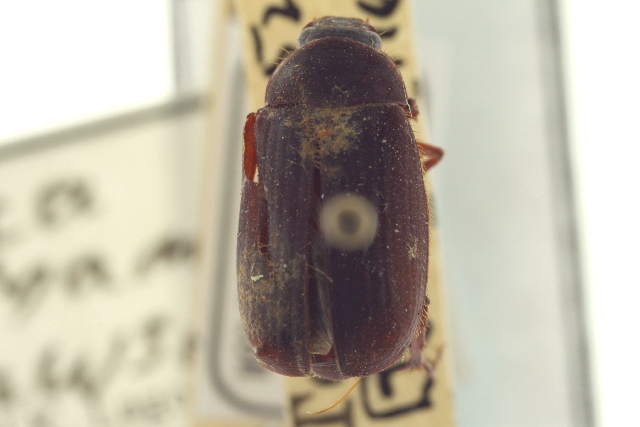

Scientific classification
- Kingdom: Animalia
- Phylum: Arthropoda
- Class: Insecta
- Order: Coleoptera
- Suborder: Polyphaga
- Infraorder: Scarabaeiformia
- Family: Scarabaeidae
- Genus: Serica
- Species: S. alabama

Binomial name
- Serica alabama Dawson, 1967

= Serica alabama =

Species of beetle

Serica alabama is a species of beetle of the family Scarabaeidae. It is found in the United States (Alabama, Georgia, Kentucky, North Carolina, Ohio, Tennessee).

== Description ==
Adults are similar to Serica sericea, but are a little smaller, and the pronotum of the females is pruinose like that of the male, and not shining as in sericea.
