= Serica apatela =

Scientific classification
- Kingdom: Animalia
- Phylum: Arthropoda
- Class: Insecta
- Order: Coleoptera
- Suborder: Polyphaga
- Infraorder: Scarabaeiformia
- Family: Scarabaeidae
- Genus: Serica
- Species: S. apatela

Binomial name
- Serica apatela Dawson, 1922

Species of beetle

Serica apatela is a species of beetle of the family Scarabaeidae. It is found in the United States (Alabama).

== Description ==
Adults reach a length of about 8 mm. The colour is brown (dark bay). Adults are similar to Serica sericea, but the surface is less strongly opaque and velvety, and there is a well-developed and brilliant sheen of colours.
