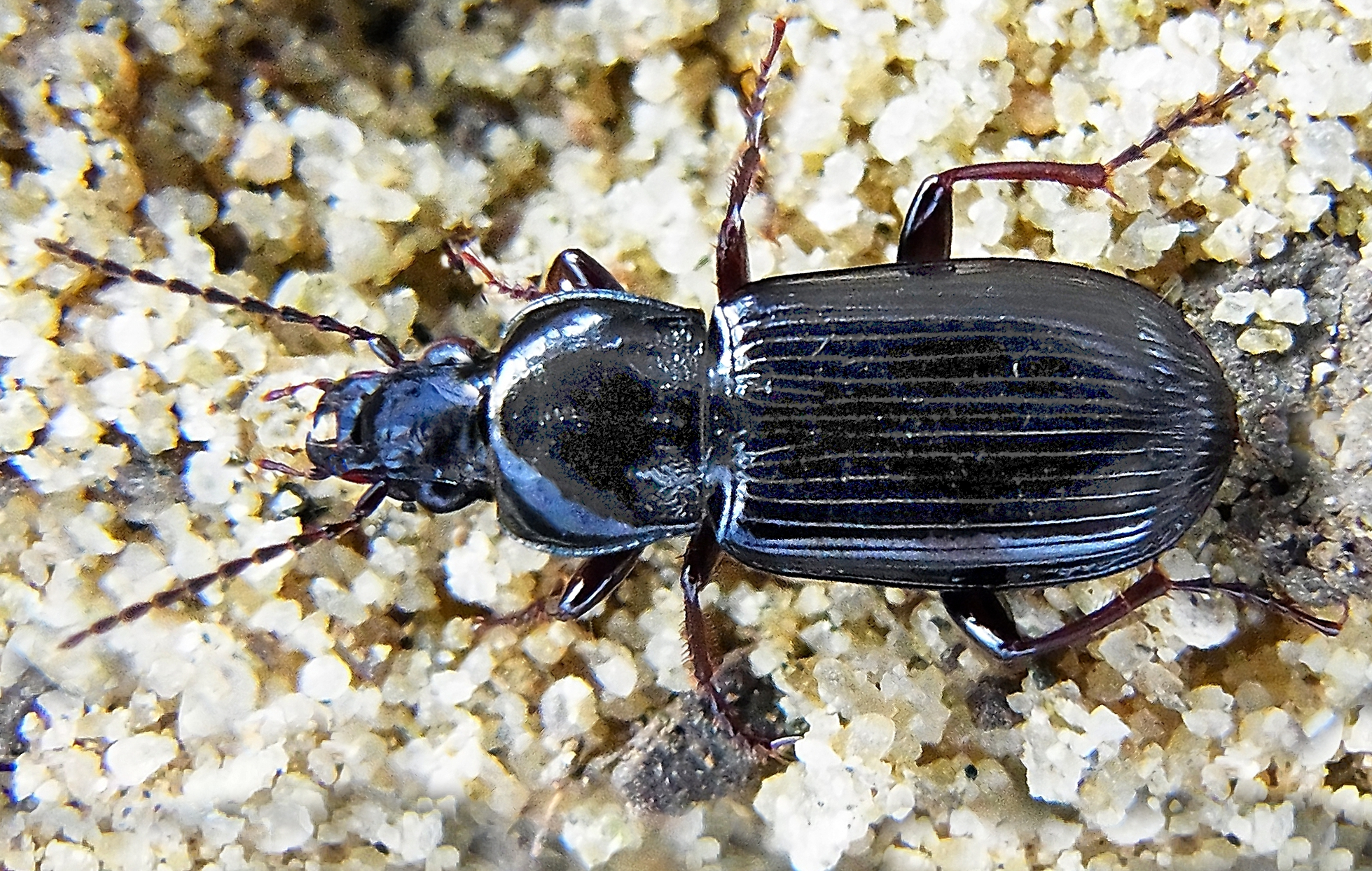

Scientific classification
- Kingdom: Animalia
- Phylum: Arthropoda
- Clade: Pancrustacea
- Class: Insecta
- Order: Coleoptera
- Suborder: Adephaga
- Family: Carabidae
- Subfamily: Pterostichinae
- Tribe: Pterostichini
- Genus: Pterostichus
- Species: P. anthracinus

Binomial name
- Pterostichus anthracinus Illiger, 1798

= Pterostichus anthracinus =

Species of beetle

Pterostichus anthracinus is a species of woodland ground beetle in the family Carabidae, native to Europe.

== Subspecies ==
These four subspecies belong to the species Pterostichus anthracinus:

- Pterostichus anthracinus anthracinus (Illiger, 1798)
- Pterostichus anthracinus biimpressus (Küster, 1853)
- Pterostichus anthracinus depressiusculus (Chaudoir, 1844)
- Pterostichus anthracinus hespericus (Bucciarelli & Sopracordevole, 1958)
