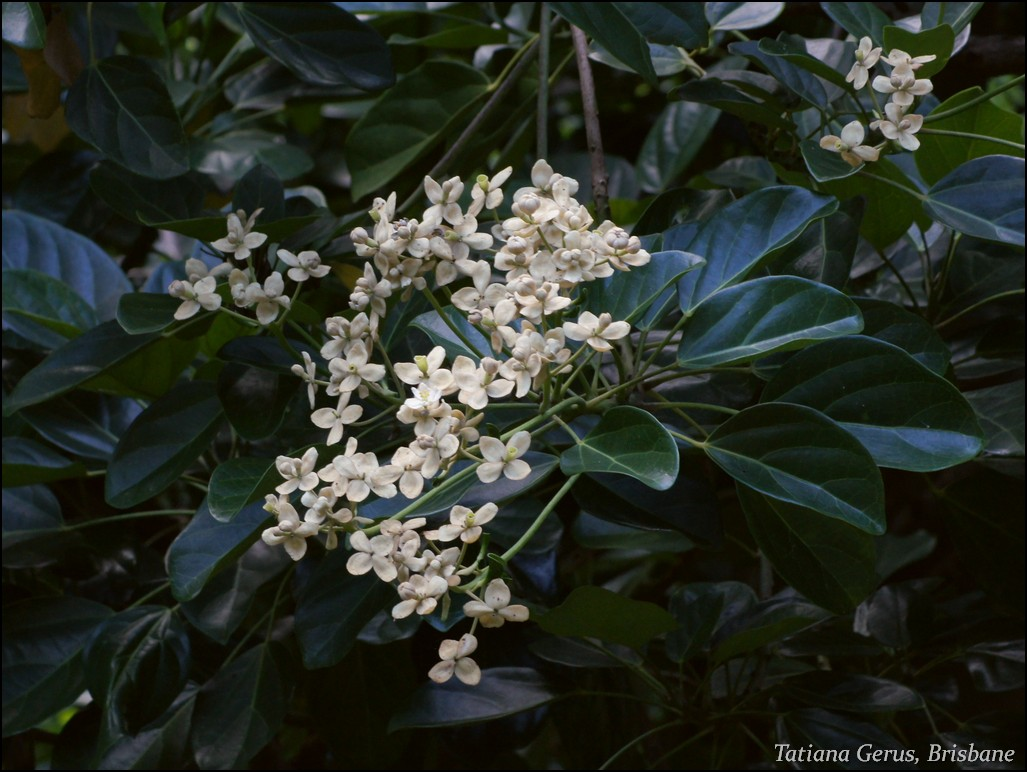

Conservation status
- Least Concern (IUCN 3.1)

Scientific classification
- Kingdom: Plantae
- Clade: Embryophytes
- Clade: Tracheophytes
- Clade: Spermatophytes
- Clade: Angiosperms
- Clade: Magnoliids
- Order: Laurales
- Family: Hernandiaceae
- Genus: Hernandia
- Species: H. moerenhoutiana

Binomial name
- Hernandia moerenhoutiana Guill.

= Hernandia moerenhoutiana =

Species of plant

Hernandia moerenhoutiana (also known as Mountain Lantern-tree, Jack-in-the-box, Tūrina, Puka Tūrina (Cook Islands Māori), Pipi (Samoan) or Pipi Tui (Tongan)) is a species of flowering plant in the family Hernandiaceae. It is widespread in the Pacific islands from Manus Island to the Society Islands, including the Solomon Islands and Cook Islands. It grows on mountainous and makatea (fossilised coral) terrain.

The species was described by Jean Baptiste Antoine Guillemin in 1837.

== Subspecies ==
Four subspecies are accepted.

- Hernandia moerenhoutiana subsp. campanulata Kubitzki – Fiji, Niue, Samoa, Society Islands, Tonga, and Wallis and Futuna
- Hernandia moerenhoutiana subsp. elliptica H.St.John – Cook Islands (Mangaia) and Tubuai Islands (Raivavae and Tubuai). Assessed as Endangered by the IUCN Red List.
- Hernandia moerenhoutiana subsp. moerenhoutiana – Cook Islands and Society Islands
- Hernandia moerenhoutiana subsp. samoensis (Hochr.) Kubitzki (synonym Hernandia samoensis Hochr. – Bismarck Archipelago (Manus), Samoan Islands, Santa Cruz Islands, Solomon Islands, Tonga, Vanuatu, and Wallis and Futuna
