= Illigera rhodantha =

Scientific classification
- Kingdom: Plantae
- Clade: Tracheophytes
- Clade: Angiosperms
- Clade: Magnoliids
- Order: Laurales
- Family: Hernandiaceae
- Genus: Illigera
- Species: I. rhodantha

Binomial name
- Illigera rhodantha Hance

Synonyms
- Illigera rhodantha var. orbiculata Y.R. Li; Illigera rhodantha var. angustifoliolata Y.R. Li; Illigera petelotii Merr.

Species of flowering plant

Illigera rhodantha is a species of liana in the family Hernandiaceae. It is found in subtropical and tropical forests of China and Indo-China; its Vietnamese name is dây ba chẽ. The Catalogue of Life lists the subspecies I. rhodantha dunniana.
