= Carabus alysidotus =

Scientific classification
- Kingdom: Animalia
- Phylum: Arthropoda
- Clade: Pancrustacea
- Class: Insecta
- Order: Coleoptera
- Suborder: Adephaga
- Family: Carabidae
- Genus: Carabus
- Species: C. alysidotus

Binomial name
- Carabus alysidotus Illiger, 1798

Species of beetle

Carabus alysidotus is a species of ground beetle from family Carabidae found in France and Italy.
