= Serica sericeoides =

Scientific classification
- Kingdom: Animalia
- Phylum: Arthropoda
- Class: Insecta
- Order: Coleoptera
- Suborder: Polyphaga
- Infraorder: Scarabaeiformia
- Family: Scarabaeidae
- Genus: Serica
- Species: S. sericeoides

Binomial name
- Serica sericeoides Dawson, 1967

Species of beetle

Serica sericeoides is a species of beetle of the family Scarabaeidae. It is found in the United States (Alabama).

== Description ==
Adults are nearly identical to Serica sericea, but may be distinguished by the male genitalia.
