= Hernandia mascarenensis =

Conservation status
- Endangered (IUCN 2.3)

Scientific classification
- Kingdom: Plantae
- Clade: Embryophytes
- Clade: Tracheophytes
- Clade: Spermatophytes
- Clade: Angiosperms
- Clade: Magnoliids
- Order: Laurales
- Family: Hernandiaceae
- Genus: Hernandia
- Species: H. mascarenensis

Binomial name
- Hernandia mascarenensis (Meisn.) Kubitzki

Synonyms
- Hernandia ovigera var. mascarenensis Meisn.

Species of flowering plant

Hernandia mascarenensis is a species of flowering plant in the Hernandiaceae family. It is a tree native to Mauritius and Réunion.
