= Hernandia lychnifera =

Conservation status
- Endangered (IUCN 3.1)

Scientific classification
- Kingdom: Plantae
- Clade: Embryophytes
- Clade: Tracheophytes
- Clade: Spermatophytes
- Clade: Angiosperms
- Clade: Magnoliids
- Order: Laurales
- Family: Hernandiaceae
- Genus: Hernandia
- Species: H. lychnifera

Binomial name
- Hernandia lychnifera Grayum & N.Zamora

Species of flowering plant

Hernandia lychnifera is a species of flowering plant in the Hernandiaceae family. It is endemic to Ecuador. Its natural habitats are tropical moist lowland forests and tropical moist montane forests.
