= Paratriodonta proboscidea =

Scientific classification
- Kingdom: Animalia
- Phylum: Arthropoda
- Class: Insecta
- Order: Coleoptera
- Suborder: Polyphaga
- Infraorder: Scarabaeiformia
- Family: Scarabaeidae
- Genus: Paratriodonta
- Species: P. proboscidea

Binomial name
- Paratriodonta proboscidea (Illiger, 1801)

Synonyms
- Melolontha proboscidea Illiger, 1801 (not Fabricius, 1775)

Species of beetle

Paratriodonta proboscidea is a species of beetle of the family Scarabaeidae. It is found in Morocco.

== Description ==
Adults reach a length of about 4–5 mm. The upper and lower surfaces are light brown, with a darker pronotal disc and the head entirely black. Sometimes the pronotum, base and sides of the elytra and pygidium are also black. The pubescence consists of short yellow, sparse hairs, and long, erect setae on the head (around the eyes), on the pronotum, pygidium, lateral margin, and base of the elytra.
