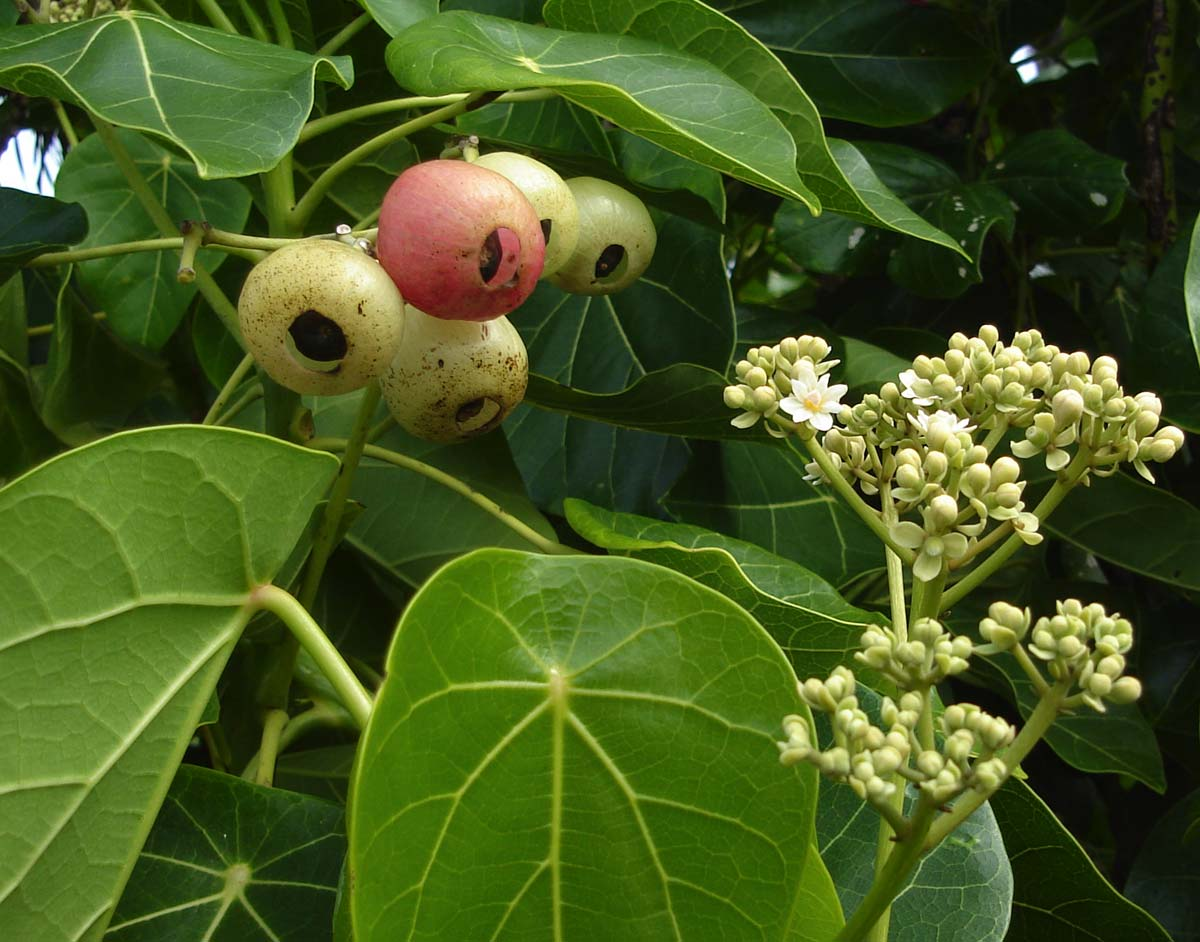
- Hernandia nymphaeifolia

Scientific classification
- Kingdom: Plantae
- Clade: Embryophytes
- Clade: Tracheophytes
- Clade: Spermatophytes
- Clade: Angiosperms
- Clade: Magnoliids
- Order: Laurales
- Family: Hernandiaceae
- Genus: Hernandia; Plum. ex L.

Species
- See text

Synonyms
- Biasolettia J.Presl; Hazomalamia Capuron; Hernandezia Hoffmanns.; Hernandiopsis Meisn.; Hertelia Neck.; Valvanthera C.T.White

= Hernandia =

Genus of flowering plants

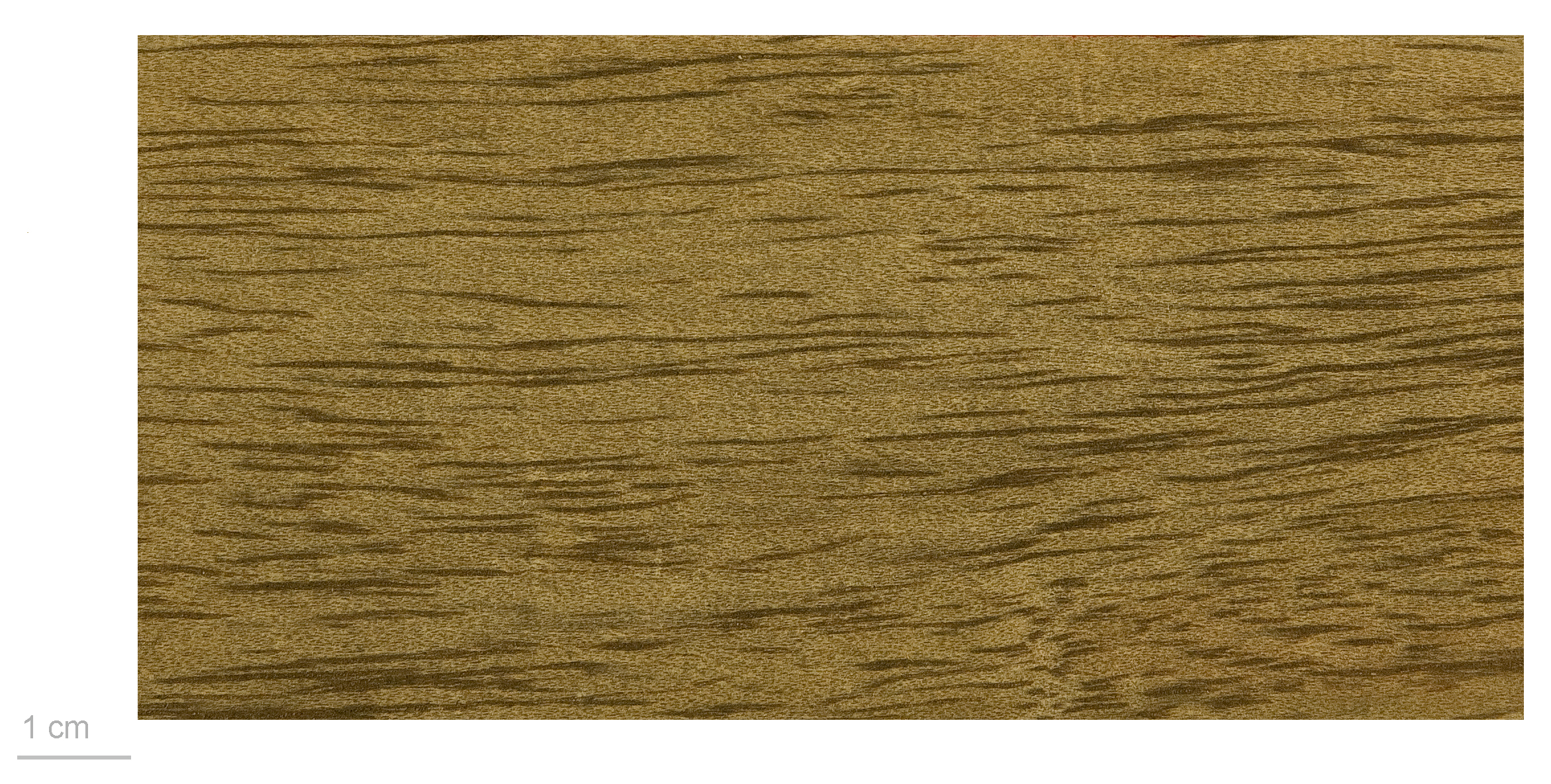
Hernandia cordigera - MHNT

Hernandia is a genus of flowering plants in the family Hernandiaceae. It was named after the Spanish botanist Francisco Hernández de Toledo.

== Species ==
As of May 2026, Plants of the World Online accepts the following species:

- Hernandia albiflora (C.T.White) Kubitzki – northeast Queensland
- Hernandia beninensis Welw. ex Henriq. – São Tomé
- Hernandia bivalvis Benth. – eastern Queensland
- Hernandia catalpifolia Britton & Harris – Jamaica
- Hernandia cordigera Vieill. – New Caledonia
- Hernandia cubensis Griseb. – Cuba
- Hernandia didymantha Donn.Sm. – southern Mexico (Chiapas), Central America, Colombia, and Ecuador
- Hernandia drakeana Nadeaud – Society Islands (Moorea)
- Hernandia guianensis Aubl. – Trinidad, Venezuela, the Guianas, and northern Brazil
- Hernandia hammelii D'Arcy – Panama
- Hernandia jamaicensis Britton & Harris – Jamaica
- Hernandia kunstleri King ex K.Heyne
- Hernandia labyrinthica Tuyama – New Guinea, Solomon Islands, and Marianas
- Hernandia leucomphala (Hoffmanns.) Steud.
- Hernandia lychnifera Grayum & N.Zamora – Ecuador
- Hernandia mascarenensis (Meisn.) Kubitzki – Mauritius and Réunion
- Hernandia moerenhoutiana Guill. – Bismarck Archipelago, Solomon Islands, Vanuatu, Fiji, Tonga, Samoan Islands, Society Islands, Tubuai Islands, Niue, and Wallis and Futuna
- Hernandia nukuhivensis F.Br. – Marquesas Islands
- Hernandia nymphaeifolia (C.Presl) Kubitzki – Madagascar, Indian Ocean islands, Sri Lanka, Indochina, Indonesia, New Guinea, Australia (Northern Territory and Queensland), and South Pacific
- Hernandia obovata O.C.Schmidt – Haiti
- Hernandia olivacea Gillespie – Fiji
- Hernandia ovigera L. – Nicobar Islands, Myanmar, Indonesia, Philippines, New Guinea, and South Pacific
  - Hernandia ovigera subsp. stokesii (F.Br.) J.Florence – Pitcairn Islands, Society Islands, and Tubuai Islands
- Hernandia papuana C.T.White
- Hernandia rostrata Kubitzki – Solomon Islands
- Hernandia samoensis Hochr.
- Hernandia sonora L. – Mexico and the Caribbean islands
- Hernandia stenura Standl. – southern Mexico, Central America, and Colombia
- Hernandia temarii Nadeaud – Society Islands (Tahiti)
- Hernandia voyronii Jum. – Madagascar
- Hernandia wendtii Espejo – central Mexico to Honduras
