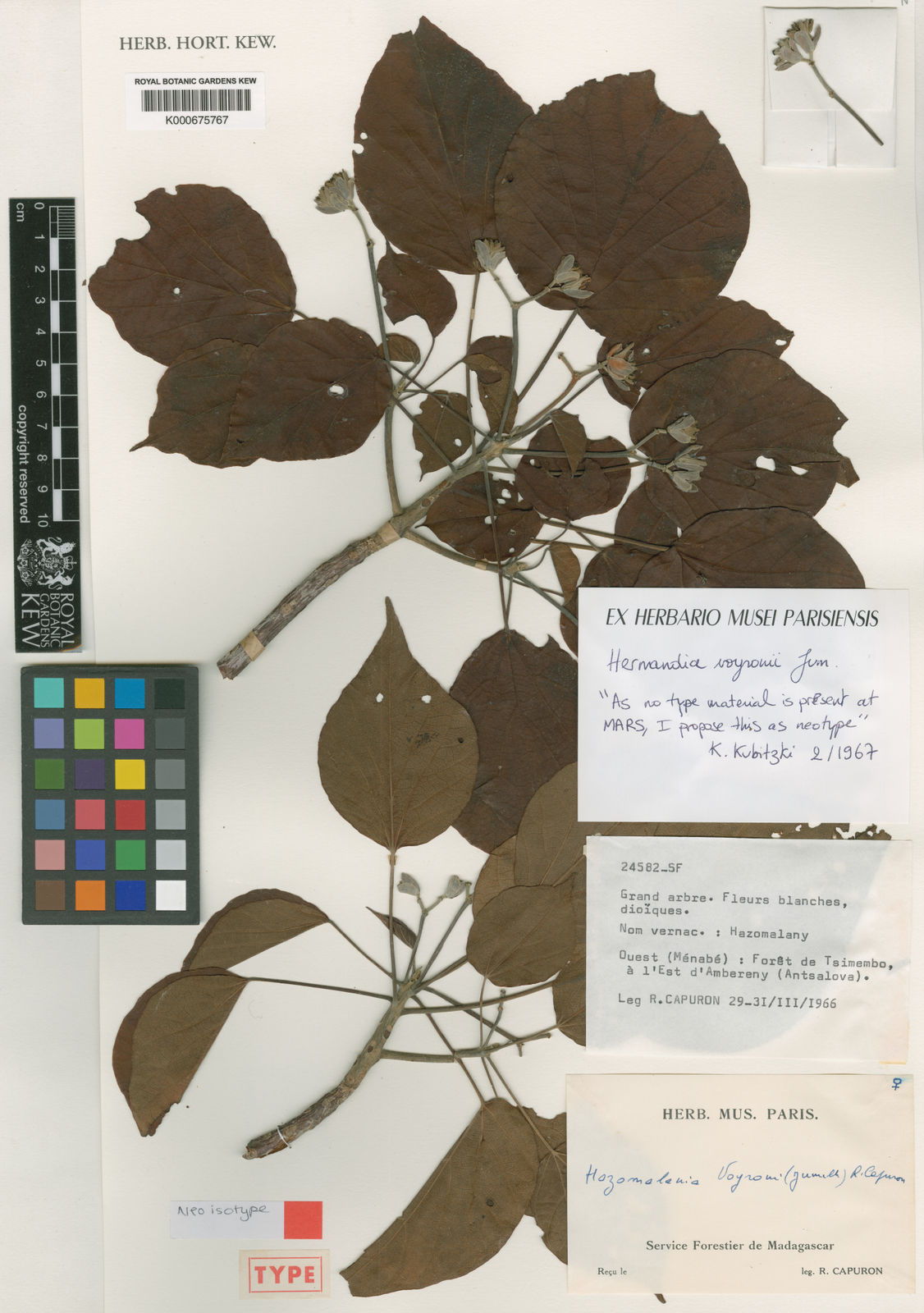
- Neotype at RGB Kew.

Conservation status
- Critically Endangered (IUCN 3.1)

Scientific classification
- Kingdom: Plantae
- Clade: Embryophytes
- Clade: Tracheophytes
- Clade: Spermatophytes
- Clade: Angiosperms
- Clade: Magnoliids
- Order: Laurales
- Family: Hernandiaceae
- Genus: Hernandia
- Species: H. voyronii

Binomial name
- Hernandia voyronii Jum.

Synonyms
- Hazomalania voyronii (Jum.) Capuron

= Hernandia voyronii =

Species of flowering plant

Hernandia voyronii, commonly known as Hazomalany (or the synonym Hazomalania) is a species of plant in the Hernandiaceae family. It is endemic to Madagascar.

== Description ==
Hernandia voyronii is a large tree which grows from 15 to 25 meters tall.

== Range and habitat ==
Hernandia voyronii is endemic to western and southwestern Madagascar. It is found in southern Melaky region, western Menabe region, and west-central Atsimo-Andrefana region, from sea level to 658 meters elevation. It is found in the Tsimembo Forest and Antseva Forest and along the Iakora-Ihosy Road. The species' estimated extent of occurrence (EOO) is 70,569 km^{2}, and its estimated area of occupancy (AOO) is 94 km^{2}.

It grows in spiny thicket, dry forest, and succulent woodland habitats, typically on sandstone and unconsolidated sand substrates. Young trees grow in shade, so reproduction requires limited habitat disturbance.

== Population and threats ==
The species is known from 77 occurrences in 18 subpopulations. Subpopulations are generally 10 to 13 mature individuals, and the species' total population is estimated to be 180 to 234 mature individuals.

The species is threatened with habitat loss from human-caused fires, clearance of land for agriculture, timber harvesting, and a climate change induced increase in rainfall within its range. Its conservation status is assessed as critically endangered. Portions of its habitat are in protected areas.

== Uses ==
The timber of Hernandia voyronii has many uses in western Madagascar, including for canoes, coffins, houses, furniture. Parts of the plant have numerous medicinal uses, including treatment of malaria. The use and trade of the species is prohibited, but it is still sought after and harvested for use by local people.
