= Paratriodonta atlantis =

Scientific classification
- Kingdom: Animalia
- Phylum: Arthropoda
- Class: Insecta
- Order: Coleoptera
- Suborder: Polyphaga
- Infraorder: Scarabaeiformia
- Family: Scarabaeidae
- Genus: Paratriodonta
- Species: P. atlantis

Binomial name
- Paratriodonta atlantis (Baraud, 1961)

Synonyms
- Triodonta atlantis Baraud, 1961

Species of beetle

Paratriodonta atlantis is a species of beetle of the family Scarabaeidae. It is found in Morocco.

== Description ==
The body is entirely black and glossy, covered with black pubescence, consisting of short hairs and long, fine, erect setae.
