= Paratriodonta mskalica =

Scientific classification
- Kingdom: Animalia
- Phylum: Arthropoda
- Class: Insecta
- Order: Coleoptera
- Suborder: Polyphaga
- Infraorder: Scarabaeiformia
- Family: Scarabaeidae
- Genus: Paratriodonta
- Species: P. mskalica

Binomial name
- Paratriodonta mskalica (Escalera, 1914)

Synonyms
- Triodonta mskalica Escalera, 1914

Species of beetle

Paratriodonta mskalica is a species of beetle of the family Scarabaeidae. It is found in Morocco.

== Description ==
Adults reach a length of about 6.5-8 mm. They are black, with the elytra yellowish-brown with black sutures and sides. The pubescence is entirely pale yellow.
