= Paratriodonta cinctipennis =

Scientific classification
- Kingdom: Animalia
- Phylum: Arthropoda
- Class: Insecta
- Order: Coleoptera
- Suborder: Polyphaga
- Infraorder: Scarabaeiformia
- Family: Scarabaeidae
- Genus: Paratriodonta
- Species: P. cinctipennis

Binomial name
- Paratriodonta cinctipennis (Lucas, 1846)

Synonyms
- Hymenoplia cinctipennis Lucas, 1846; Triodontella cinctipennis atra Normand, 1936; Triodonta pumila Burmeister, 1855; Triodonta puberula Erichson, 1848

Species of beetle

Paratriodonta cinctipennis is a species of beetle of the family Scarabaeidae. It is found in Algeria, Italy (Sicily) and Tunisia.

== Description ==
Adults reach a length of about 6–7 mm. They are black, with the elytra yellowish-brown, although the suture and sides are largely black, as well as, sometimes, the base and apex. Sometimes, the elytra are entirely brownish-black. The hairs are always entirely yellow.
