= Paratriodonta normandi =

Scientific classification
- Kingdom: Animalia
- Phylum: Arthropoda
- Class: Insecta
- Order: Coleoptera
- Suborder: Polyphaga
- Infraorder: Scarabaeiformia
- Family: Scarabaeidae
- Genus: Paratriodonta
- Species: P. normandi

Binomial name
- Paratriodonta normandi (Baraud, 1961)

Synonyms
- Triodonta normandi Baraud, 1961

Species of beetle

Paratriodonta normandi is a species of beetle of the family Scarabaeidae. It is found in Tunisia.

== Description ==
Adults reach a length of about 7 mm. The head and pronotum are black, as are the suture and the sides of the elytra. The disc of the elytra is lighter, dark reddish-brown. The underside is black and the legs are reddish-brown. The entire upper surface is covered with yellowish-brown pubescence, consisting of short hairs and long, erect hairs.
