= Paratriodonta ochroptera =

Scientific classification
- Kingdom: Animalia
- Phylum: Arthropoda
- Class: Insecta
- Order: Coleoptera
- Suborder: Polyphaga
- Infraorder: Scarabaeiformia
- Family: Scarabaeidae
- Genus: Paratriodonta
- Species: P. ochroptera

Binomial name
- Paratriodonta ochroptera (Erichson, 1841)

Synonyms
- Omaloplia ochroptera Erichson, 1841

Species of beetle

Paratriodonta ochroptera is a species of beetle of the family Scarabaeidae. It is found in Algeria and Morocco.

== Description ==
Adults reach a length of about 6-6.5 mm. The head, pronotum, scutellum, pygidium, legs and underside are black, while the elytra are yellowish-brown with black-edged sides. The suture is narrowly darkened, with the first interstria remaining mostly pale. The pubescence is entirely pale yellow.
