= Paratriodonta lentula =

Scientific classification
- Kingdom: Animalia
- Phylum: Arthropoda
- Class: Insecta
- Order: Coleoptera
- Suborder: Polyphaga
- Infraorder: Scarabaeiformia
- Family: Scarabaeidae
- Genus: Paratriodonta
- Species: P. lentula

Binomial name
- Paratriodonta lentula (Normand, 1949)

Synonyms
- Triodontella lentula Normand, 1949

Species of beetle

Paratriodonta lentula is a species of beetle of the family Scarabaeidae. It is found in Algeria and Tunisia.

== Description ==
Adults reach a length of about 5–6 mm. They are black, with the elytral disc rusty brown, the first interstria and the three marginal interstriae remain blackish. The pubescence consists of sparse, dark grey, long and erect setae and white, short, thick hairs that form poorly defined bands on the elytra.
