= Paratriodonta vicina =

Scientific classification
- Kingdom: Animalia
- Phylum: Arthropoda
- Class: Insecta
- Order: Coleoptera
- Suborder: Polyphaga
- Infraorder: Scarabaeiformia
- Family: Scarabaeidae
- Genus: Paratriodonta
- Species: P. vicina

Binomial name
- Paratriodonta vicina Baraud, 1962

Species of beetle

Paratriodonta vicina is a species of beetle of the family Scarabaeidae. It is found in Algeria.

== Description ==
Adults reach a length of about 6–7 mm. They have a convex, globose, entirely black and glossy body, although the elytral apex is sometimes lightened and reddish. The pubescence consists of long brownish-black hairs on the pronotum, long yellow hairs on the elytra and ventral surface, and short yellow setae all over the upper surface.
