= Paratriodonta unguicularis =

Scientific classification
- Kingdom: Animalia
- Phylum: Arthropoda
- Class: Insecta
- Order: Coleoptera
- Suborder: Polyphaga
- Infraorder: Scarabaeiformia
- Family: Scarabaeidae
- Genus: Paratriodonta
- Species: P. unguicularis

Binomial name
- Paratriodonta unguicularis (Erichson, 1841)

Synonyms
- Omaloplia unguicularis Erichson, 1841

Species of beetle

Paratriodonta unguicularis is a species of beetle of the family Scarabaeidae. It is found in Algeria and Morocco.

== Description ==
Adults reach a length of about 6.5–7.5 mm. They have an entirely black, globular body. The pubescence is also black, except for short, pale hairs on the elytra and yellow pubescence on the ventral surface. Sometimes the elytral pubescence is entirely pale.
