= Paratriodonta =

Scientific classification
- Kingdom: Animalia
- Phylum: Arthropoda
- Clade: Pancrustacea
- Class: Insecta
- Order: Coleoptera
- Suborder: Polyphaga
- Infraorder: Scarabaeiformia
- Family: Scarabaeidae
- Subfamily: Sericinae
- Tribe: Sericini
- Genus: Paratriodonta; Baraud, 1962

Genus of leaf beetles

Paratriodonta is a genus of beetles belonging to the family Scarabaeidae.

== Species ==
- Paratriodonta algirica (Reitter, 1889)
- Paratriodonta alicantina (Reitter, 1890)
- Paratriodonta atlantis (Baraud, 1961)
- Paratriodonta cinctipennis (Lucas, 1846)
- Paratriodonta demoflysi (Normand, 1949)
- Paratriodonta kocheri (Baraud, 1961)
- Paratriodonta lentula (Normand, 1949)
- Paratriodonta maroccana (Brenske, 1889)
- Paratriodonta morio (Fabricius, 1792)
- Paratriodonta mskalica (Escalera, 1914)
- Paratriodonta normandi (Baraud, 1961)
- Paratriodonta ochroptera (Erichson, 1841)
- Paratriodonta olivieri (Blanchard, 1850)
- Paratriodonta proboscidea (Illiger, 1801)
- Paratriodonta romana (Brenske, 1890)
- Paratriodonta solitudinis Baraud, 1985
- Paratriodonta temperei Baraud, 1962
- Paratriodonta tripolitana (Brenske, 1889)
- Paratriodonta unguicularis (Erichson, 1841)
- Paratriodonta vicina Baraud, 1962
