= Paratriodonta temperei =

Scientific classification
- Kingdom: Animalia
- Phylum: Arthropoda
- Class: Insecta
- Order: Coleoptera
- Suborder: Polyphaga
- Infraorder: Scarabaeiformia
- Family: Scarabaeidae
- Genus: Paratriodonta
- Species: P. temperei

Binomial name
- Paratriodonta temperei Baraud, 1962

Species of beetle

Paratriodonta temperei is a species of beetle of the family Scarabaeidae. It is found in Algeria.

== Description ==
Adults reach a length of about 5 mm. They are black, but the elytra are either yellow with black suture and sides, or entirely black. The elytral disc and legs are very slightly lightened, very dark reddish-brown. The hairs on the head and pronotum are dark, while those on the elytra are light.
