= Paratriodonta algirica =

Scientific classification
- Kingdom: Animalia
- Phylum: Arthropoda
- Class: Insecta
- Order: Coleoptera
- Suborder: Polyphaga
- Infraorder: Scarabaeiformia
- Family: Scarabaeidae
- Genus: Paratriodonta
- Species: P. algirica

Binomial name
- Paratriodonta algirica (Reitter, 1889)

Synonyms
- Triodonta algirica Reitter, 1889

Species of beetle

Paratriodonta algirica is a species of beetle of the family Scarabaeidae. It is found in Algeria.

== Description ==
Adults reach a length of about 5.5–7.5 mm. They have a convex, somewhat elongate body. They are entirely black, except for the tips of the legs, which are slightly lighter. The pubescence on the head and pronotum is black, while the hairs are light on the ventral surface and, most often, on the elytra.
