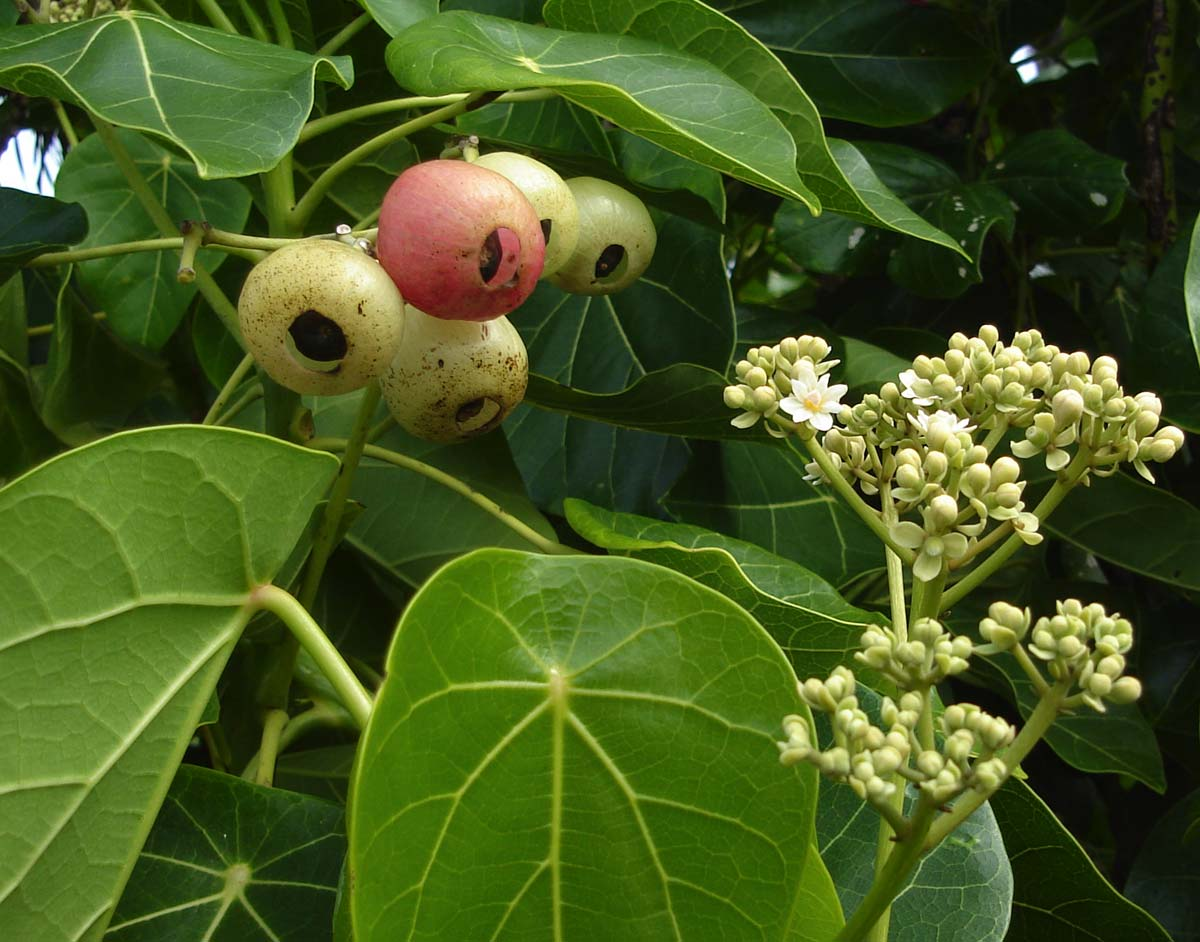

Conservation status
- Least Concern (IUCN 3.1)

Scientific classification
- Kingdom: Plantae
- Clade: Embryophytes
- Clade: Tracheophytes
- Clade: Spermatophytes
- Clade: Angiosperms
- Clade: Magnoliids
- Order: Laurales
- Family: Hernandiaceae
- Genus: Hernandia
- Species: H. nymphaeifolia

Binomial name
- Hernandia nymphaeifolia (C.Presl) Kubitzki

Synonyms
- Biasolettia nymphaeifolia C.Presl (1835); Hernandia sonora var. nymphaeifolia (C.Presl) Fosberg; Hernandia peltata Meisn.; Hernandia peltata var. cordata Hochr.; Hernandia vitiensis Seem. ex Pax; Sassafras mauritianum Bojer

= Hernandia nymphaeifolia =

Species of flowering plant

Hernandia nymphaeifolia is a species of plant in the Hernandiaceae family. Its common name is lantern tree. It is a tree native to Madagascar and the western Indian Ocean islands, the Maldives, Sri Lanka, Indochina, Malesia, Papupasia, northern Australia, and the Pacific.

The species was first described as Biasolettia nymphaeifolia by Carl Borivoj Presl in 1835. In 1970 Klaus Kubitzki placed the species in genus Hernandia as H. nymphaeifolia.

== Description ==
Hernandia nymphaeifolia is a tree with 5–22 m high. The leaves are narrowly or broadly ovate or subcircular. The 5-9 veins are palmate. The flowers are white or greenish, hermaphrodite, with fragrant odour; male and female are separated. The fruit is fleshy, waxy red or white.

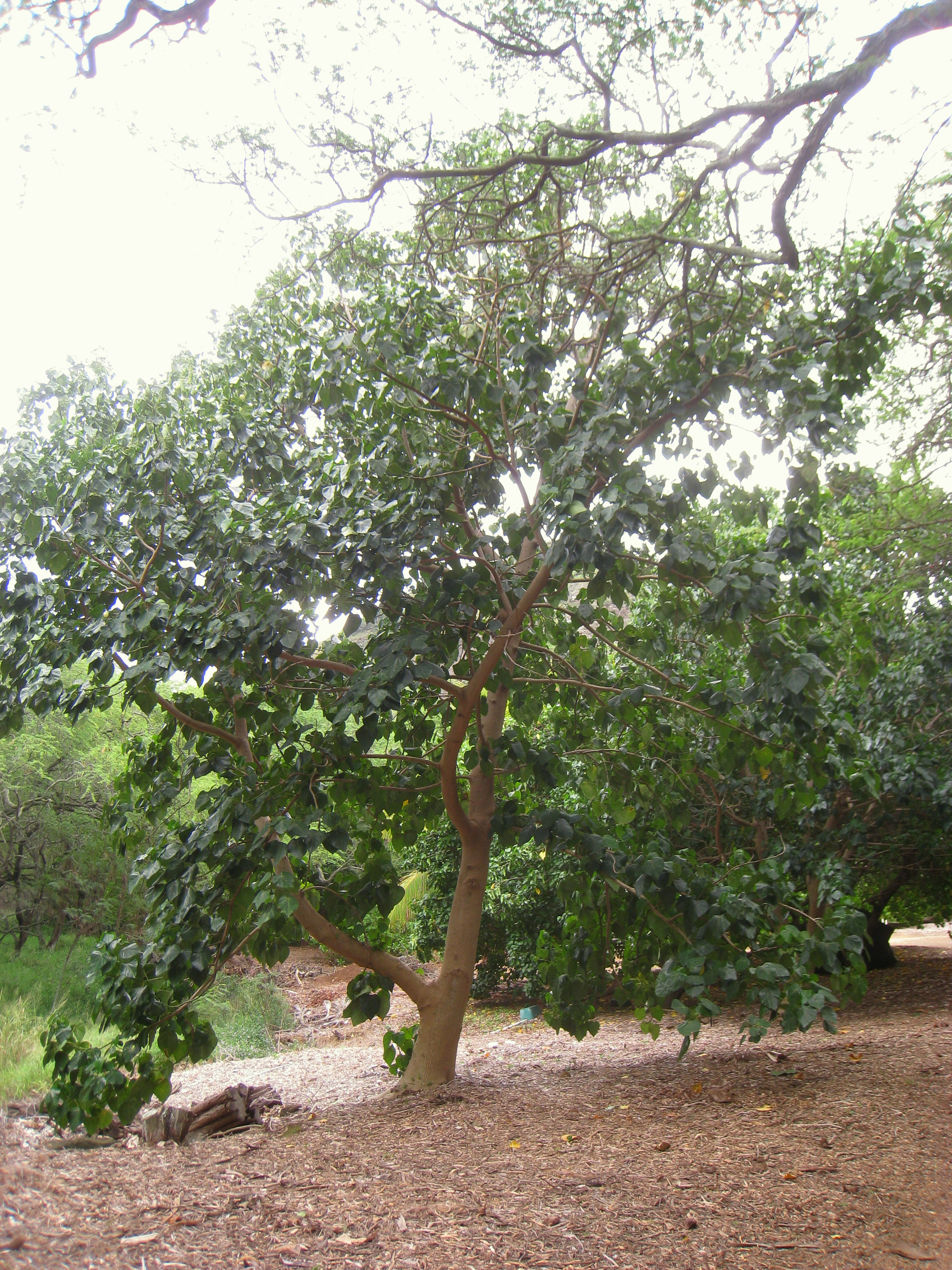
H.nymphaeifolia shrub

== Distribution and ecology ==
This species occurs throughout the tropics (Duyfjes 1996) exclusively in coastal areas: along the sea-shore in littoral forest and in coastal swamps. Fujita (1991) lists H. nymphaeifolia as being seed dispersed by the Marianas flying fox in the Mariana Islands.

It is one of the most common beach trees in New Ireland.

== Uses ==
Hernandia nymphaeifolia has a light, perishable wood. It has been used in South Pacific islands for fishing rods, fish net floats, wooden sandals, fan handles, drawing boards, canoe accessories, furniture and firewood, etc. A woody layer surrounds the seed of the lantern tree fruit. The Tahaitians polish the round brown seeds to a high gloss and fashion them into necklaces. The Marshallese bathe children in a healing bath made from H. nymphaeifolia leaves and relieve headaches with a preparation from other tree parts. The effect of lignans from this species on Ca^{2+} signaling in human neutrophils has been studied.

In parts of New Britain and Vanuatu, its wood is used for to make canoe hulls. In New Britain, the Nakanai people also use its wood to make hourglass drums. The flowers are used to treat asthma on Waya Island, Fiji.
