= Paratriodonta morio =

Scientific classification
- Kingdom: Animalia
- Phylum: Arthropoda
- Clade: Pancrustacea
- Class: Insecta
- Order: Coleoptera
- Suborder: Polyphaga
- Infraorder: Scarabaeiformia
- Family: Scarabaeidae
- Genus: Paratriodonta
- Species: P. morio

Binomial name
- Paratriodonta morio (Fabricius, 1792)

Synonyms
- Melolontha morio Fabricius, 1792; Hymenoplia aterrima Lucas, 1846

Species of beetle

Paratriodonta morio is a species of beetle of the family Scarabaeidae. It is found in Algeria and Tunisia.

== Description ==
Adults reach a length of about 6.5-7 mm. They have a globular body, which is entirely black above and below, although the elytra is very rarely dark brown. The pubescence is entirely black.
