= Paratriodonta kocheri =

Scientific classification
- Kingdom: Animalia
- Phylum: Arthropoda
- Class: Insecta
- Order: Coleoptera
- Suborder: Polyphaga
- Infraorder: Scarabaeiformia
- Family: Scarabaeidae
- Genus: Paratriodonta
- Species: P. kocheri

Binomial name
- Paratriodonta kocheri (Baraud, 1961)

Synonyms
- Triodonta kocheri Baraud, 1961

Species of beetle

Paratriodonta kocheri is a species of beetle of the family Scarabaeidae. It is found in Morocco.

== Description ==
Adults reach a length of about 4–5 mm. The body is entirely black and glossy, covered with a pubescence consisting of small whitish hairs and long, fine, erect, yellow setae.
