= Paratriodonta olivieri =

Scientific classification
- Kingdom: Animalia
- Phylum: Arthropoda
- Class: Insecta
- Order: Coleoptera
- Suborder: Polyphaga
- Infraorder: Scarabaeiformia
- Family: Scarabaeidae
- Genus: Paratriodonta
- Species: P. olivieri

Binomial name
- Paratriodonta olivieri (Blanchard, 1850)

Synonyms
- Omaloplia olivieri Blanchard, 1850; Serica delicatula Fairmaire, 1881

Species of beetle

Paratriodonta olivieri is a species of beetle of the family Scarabaeidae. It is found in Algeria, Egypt, Israel, Libya and Syria.

== Description ==
Adults reach a length of about 7 mm. The head, pronotum, scutellum and ventral surface are black, while the elytra are yellow, slightly darkened at the base and along the suture. The pygidium is also yellow and the legs are reddish-brown. The hairs are entirely pale yellow.
