= Paratriodonta maroccana =

Scientific classification
- Kingdom: Animalia
- Phylum: Arthropoda
- Class: Insecta
- Order: Coleoptera
- Suborder: Polyphaga
- Infraorder: Scarabaeiformia
- Family: Scarabaeidae
- Genus: Paratriodonta
- Species: P. maroccana

Binomial name
- Paratriodonta maroccana (Brenske, 1889)

Synonyms
- Triodonta maroccana Brenske, 1889; Triodonta maroccana mamorensis Baraud, 1961; Triodonta maura Baraud, 1961; Paratriodonta maura

Species of beetle

Paratriodonta maroccana is a species of beetle of the family Scarabaeidae. It is found in Morocco.

== Description ==
Adults reach a length of about 5–8 mm. They are black, with the elytra yellowish-brown edged in black on the sides and suture, but sometimes entirely black. They yellow short hairs, as well as dark yellowish-brown long hairs, at least on the pronotum, sometimes the long hairs are brown-black or black, but the short hairs remain yellow on the pronotum and elytra.
