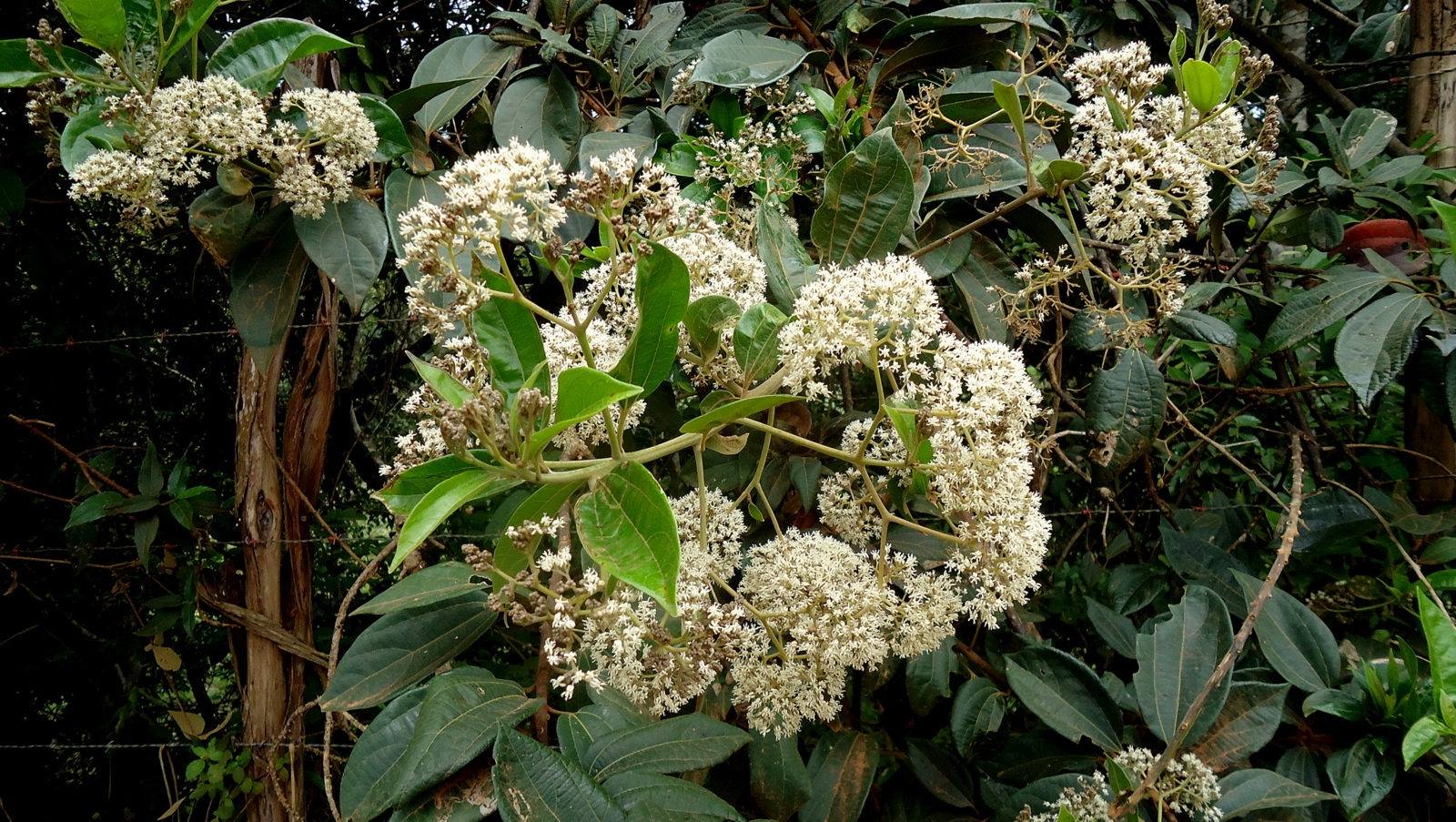
- Sparattanthelium botocudorum

Scientific classification
- Kingdom: Plantae
- Clade: Tracheophytes
- Clade: Angiosperms
- Clade: Magnoliids
- Order: Laurales
- Family: Hernandiaceae
- Genus: Sparattanthelium; Mart.

= Sparattanthelium =

Genus of flowering plants

Sparattanthelium is a genus of flowering plants belonging to the family Hernandiaceae. It includes 28 species native to the tropical Americas, ranging from southern Mexico through Central America and northern South America to Bolivia and southeastern Brazil.

== Species ==
11 species are accepted.

- Sparattanthelium acreanum Pilg.
- Sparattanthelium amazonum Mart.
- Sparattanthelium aruakorum Tutin
- Sparattanthelium borororum Mart.
- Sparattanthelium botocudorum Mart.
- Sparattanthelium burchellii Rusby
- Sparattanthelium glabrum Rusby
- Sparattanthelium guianense Sandwith
- Sparattanthelium tarapotanum Meisn.
- Sparattanthelium tupiniquinorum Mart.
- Sparattanthelium wonotoboense Kosterm.
