= Paratriodonta alicantina =

Scientific classification
- Kingdom: Animalia
- Phylum: Arthropoda
- Class: Insecta
- Order: Coleoptera
- Suborder: Polyphaga
- Infraorder: Scarabaeiformia
- Family: Scarabaeidae
- Genus: Paratriodonta
- Species: P. alicantina

Binomial name
- Paratriodonta alicantina (Reitter, 1890)

Synonyms
- Triodonta alicantina Reitter, 1890

Species of beetle

Paratriodonta alicantina is a species of beetle of the family Scarabaeidae. It is found in Spain.

== Description ==
Adults reach a length of about 6–7 mm. The head, pronotum, pygidium, ventral surface and legs are black and the elytra are yellowish-brown with black on the sides and along the suture. The antennae are black.
