= Paratriodonta romana =

Scientific classification
- Kingdom: Animalia
- Phylum: Arthropoda
- Class: Insecta
- Order: Coleoptera
- Suborder: Polyphaga
- Infraorder: Scarabaeiformia
- Family: Scarabaeidae
- Genus: Paratriodonta
- Species: P. romana

Binomial name
- Paratriodonta romana (Brenske, 1890)

Synonyms
- Triodonta romana Brenske, 1890

Species of beetle

Paratriodonta romana is a species of beetle of the family Scarabaeidae. It is found in Italy.

== Description ==
Adults reach a length of about 5–6 mm. They are entirely black, although sometimes the elytra are dark brown. The pubescence consists of long black hairs on the head, pronotum and base of the elytra (while the hairs are light on the rest of the elytra). There are also more or less dark short hairs on the pronotum.

== Life history ==
Adults appear in April and are diurnal. They can be observed on flowers (especially Cistus species) feeding on pollen.
