= Paratriodonta tripolitana =

Scientific classification
- Kingdom: Animalia
- Phylum: Arthropoda
- Class: Insecta
- Order: Coleoptera
- Suborder: Polyphaga
- Infraorder: Scarabaeiformia
- Family: Scarabaeidae
- Genus: Paratriodonta
- Species: P. tripolitana

Binomial name
- Paratriodonta tripolitana (Brenske, 1889)

Synonyms
- Triodonta tripolitana Brenske, 1889

Species of beetle

Paratriodonta tripolitana is a species of beetle of the family Scarabaeidae. It is found in Israel, Tunisia and Libya.

== Description ==
Adults reach a length of about 6 mm. The head, pronotum, scutellum, pygidium, and ventral surface are black, while the elytra are uniformly pale yellow, or (rarely) darkened brown at the humeral angle. The hairs are very pale (almost white).
