= Paratriodonta demoflysi =

Scientific classification
- Kingdom: Animalia
- Phylum: Arthropoda
- Class: Insecta
- Order: Coleoptera
- Suborder: Polyphaga
- Infraorder: Scarabaeiformia
- Family: Scarabaeidae
- Genus: Paratriodonta
- Species: P. demoflysi

Binomial name
- Paratriodonta demoflysi (Normand, 1949)

Synonyms
- Triodontella demoflysi Normand, 1949

Species of beetle

Paratriodonta demoflysi is a species of beetle of the family Scarabaeidae. It is found in Tunisia.

== Description ==
Adults reach a length of about 7–8 mm. They are black and dull, especially on the pronotum, and covered with yellowish pubescence, consisting of large and erect setae and short hairs. The head is strongly punctate. The pronotum has irregular, fairly dense punctures, more or less arranged in transverse rows. The elytra are finely striated, the interspaces with irregular, more or less dense punctures.
