= Cortical bundle =

Vascular system in cacti

The cortical bundle is a vascular system which allows the transportation of water and nutrients through the voluminous cortex of the cactus. This system is unique to cacti, and helps to replace the water lost to the dry desert air. The cortical bundle emerges radially from the xylem and produces shoots that run tangentially to the cortex, branching extensively and vascularizing every part of the cortex. The size of the cortical bundle can vary greatly from species to species.

Because cacti live a long time, the cortical bundles have to function for many years. In every cactus species, the cortical bundles produce secondary phloems. In very old cortical bundles located at the base of very old shoots, the secondary phloem may attain a thickness of several millimeters.
