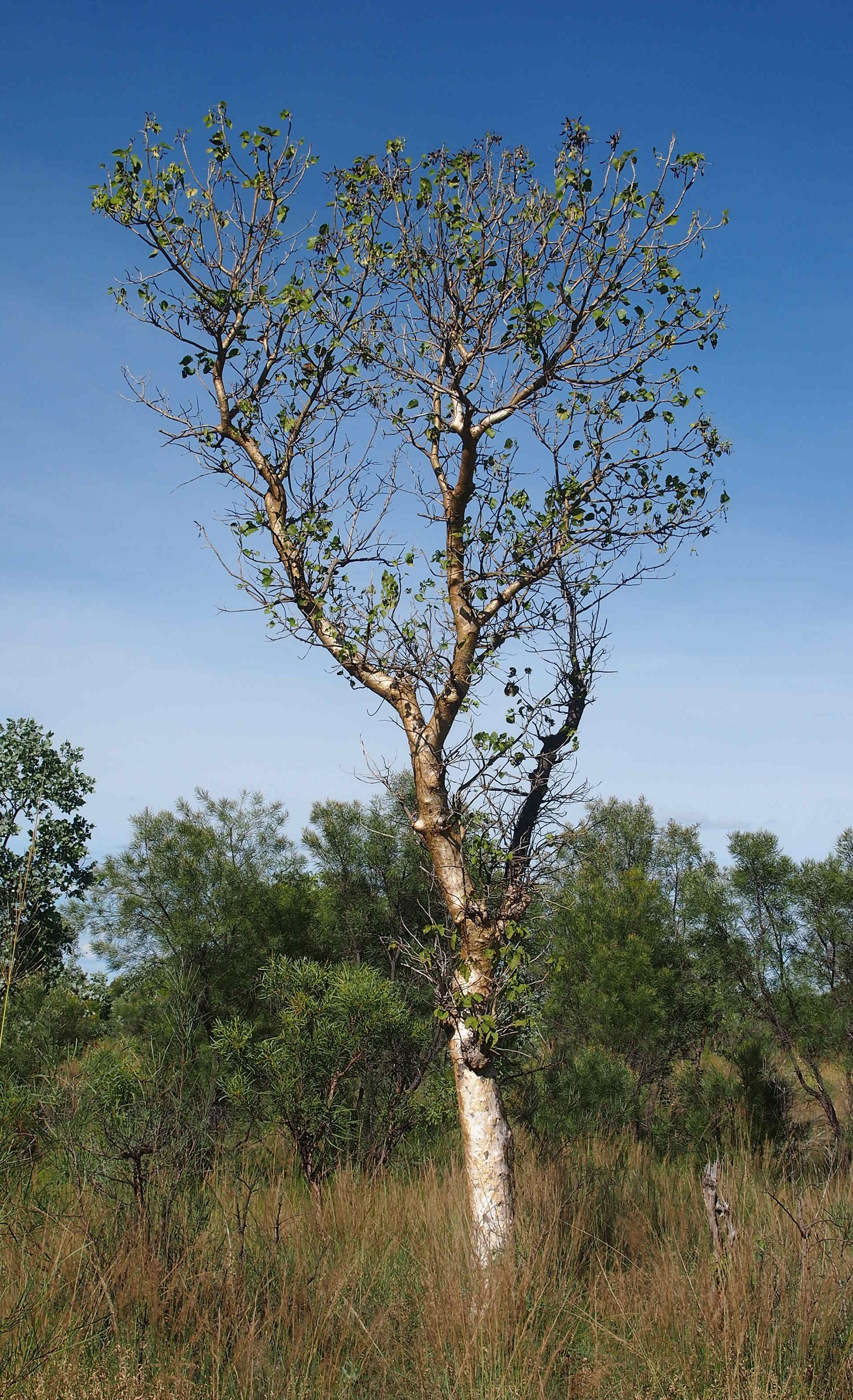

Conservation status
- Least Concern (IUCN 3.1)

Scientific classification
- Kingdom: Plantae
- Clade: Tracheophytes
- Clade: Angiosperms
- Clade: Magnoliids
- Order: Laurales
- Family: Hernandiaceae
- Genus: Gyrocarpus
- Species: G. americanus

Binomial name
- Gyrocarpus americanus Jacq.

Synonyms
- Gyrocarpus acuminatus Meisn.; Gyrocarpus asiaticus Willd.; Gyrocarpus jacquinii Gaertn. nom. illeg.; Gyrocarpus jacquinii Roxb. nom. illeg.; Gyrocarpus lobatus Blanco; Gyrocarpus rugosus R.Br.; Gyrocarpus sphenopterus R.Br.

= Gyrocarpus americanus =

Species of flowering plant

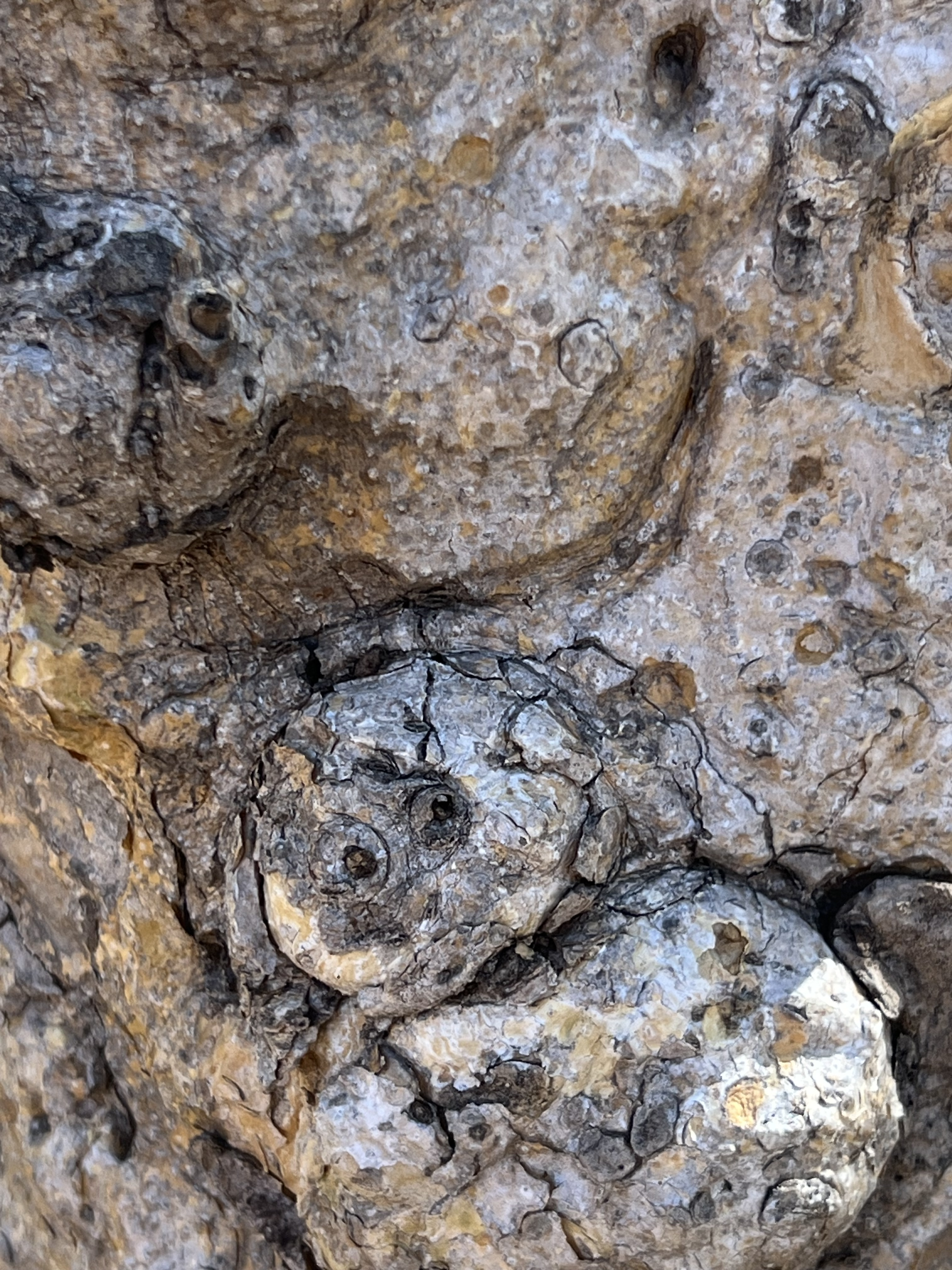
Bark

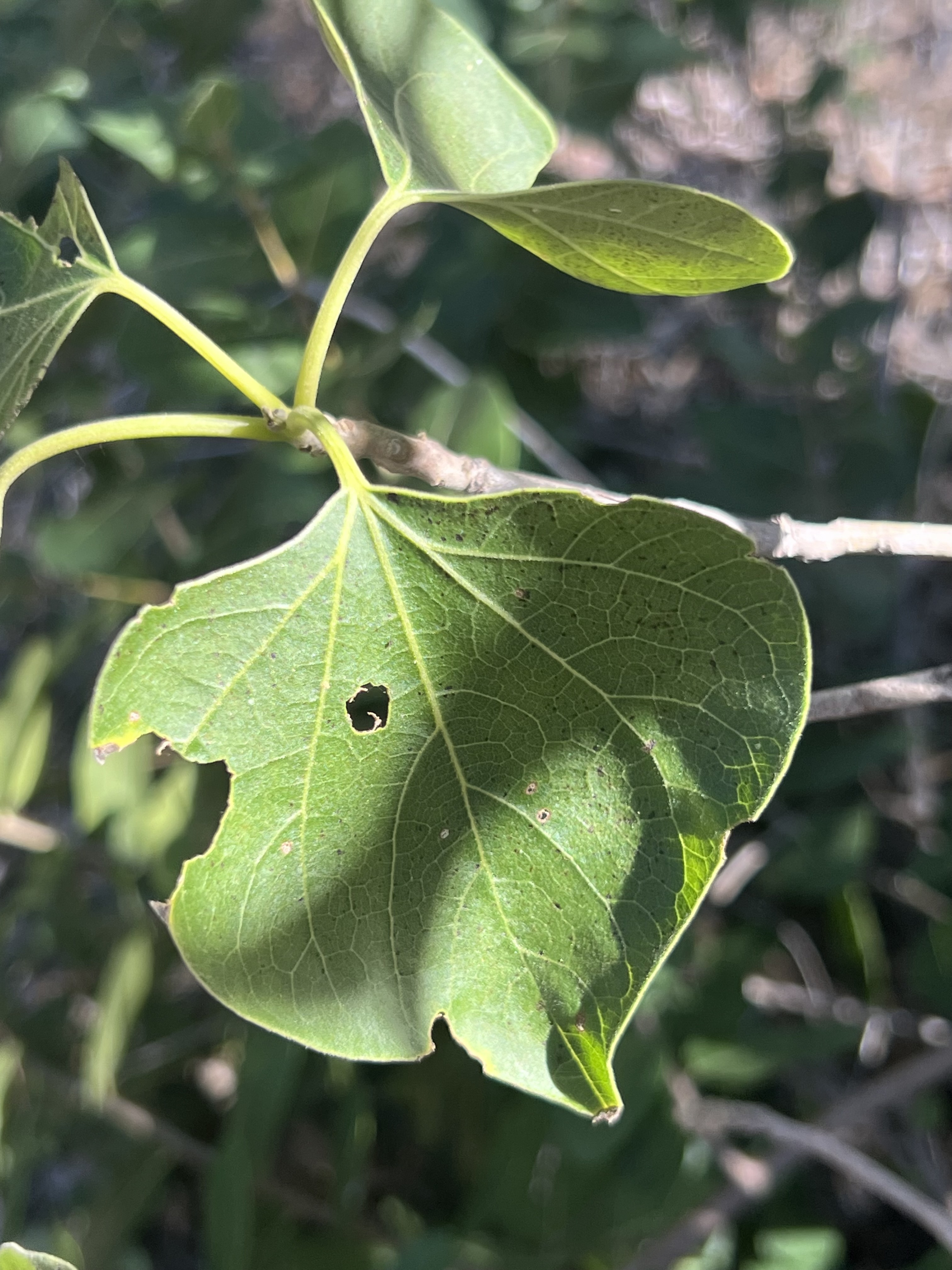
Leaf

Gyrocarpus americanus is a flowering plant in the Hernandiaceae family, with a wide pantropical distribution. Its common names include the helicopter tree, propeller tree, whirly whirly tree, stinkwood or shitwood.

== Description ==
Gyrocarpus americanus is a slender, deciduous tree with smooth, grey bark. The tree grows to about 12 m in height.

The leaves are spirally arranged, crowded near the ends of the branches, and grow up to 150 × 120 mm in size. They are ovate, often 3-lobed, dark green above, paler and greyer below, with velvety surfaces, 3-veined from the base. The veins are yellowish.

The cream to yellowish-green flowers grow in compact heads and have an unpleasant smell. The fruit is a woody nut with two long thin wings that help in wind dispersal. The winged fruit and the smell of the flowers have given the tree its various common names.

== Taxonomy ==
=== Subspecies ===
- G. a. africanus Kubitzki (Africa)
- G. a. americanus Jacq. (East Africa, India, Malesia, northern Australia, Melanesia, Polynesia, and South and Central America)
- G. a. glaber Kubitzki (Madagascar)

Several other subspecies have been described. Kubitzki distinguished eight – three in Madagascar, one each in tropical West and East Africa, one in tropical Australia, and one in Malesia, with the eighth being the typical subspecies G. a. americanus originating in the Palaeotropics and reaching the Neotropics by trans-Pacific dispersal. Most of these are rarely collected or are not recognised. Moreover, the monophyly of G. americanus remains unclear; the African species G. angustifolius and G. hababensis may lie within it.

== Uses ==
Tongan children play with its winged seeds (puko vili); its timber is an occasional vaka building material, an infusion of its bark can be drunk to cure stomach pains.

== Traditional ecological knowledge ==
The Gija people of the East Kimberly, Australia, call this tree Jarlaloony. For tens of thousands of years, they have used the wood of this tree to make coolamons and, more recently, other carved objects.
