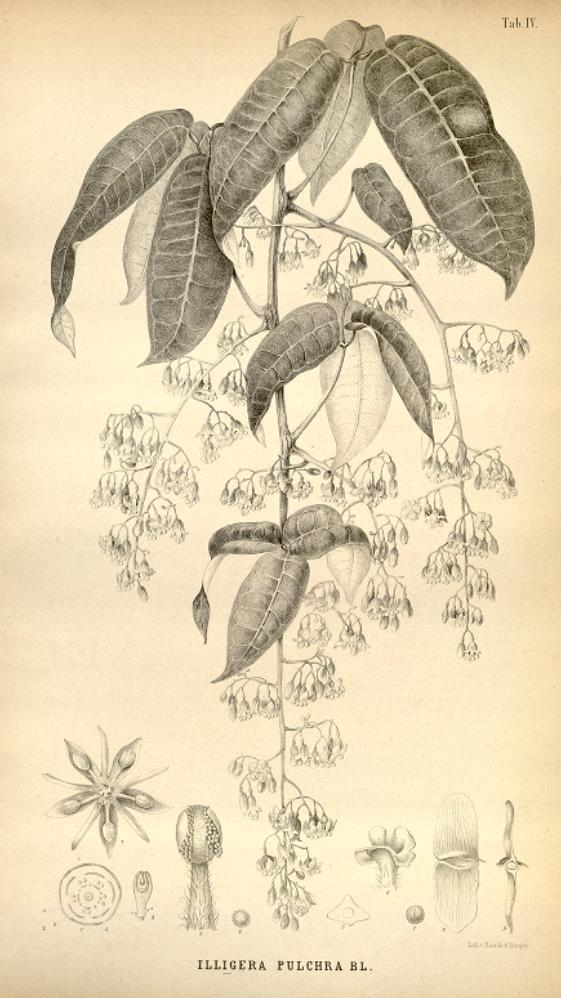
- Illigera pulchra

Scientific classification
- Kingdom: Plantae
- Clade: Tracheophytes
- Clade: Angiosperms
- Clade: Magnoliids
- Order: Laurales
- Family: Hernandiaceae
- Genus: Illigera; Blume (1826)

Species
- 28; see text

Synonyms
- Gronovia Blanco; Henschelia C.Presl; Corysadenia Griff.; Coryzadenia Griff.

= Illigera =

Genus of flowering plants

Illigera is a genus of flowering plants in the family Hernandiaceae, found in tropical regions of Africa and Asia. These plants grow as lianas.

== Species ==
28 species are accepted.

- Illigera appendiculata Blume
- Illigera aromatica S.Z.Huang & S.L.Mo
- Illigera brevistaminata Y.R.Li
- Illigera cava Breteler & Wieringa
- Illigera celebica Miq.
- Illigera cordata Dunn
- Illigera elegans Duyfjes
- Illigera gammiei M.P.Nayar & G.S.Giri
- Illigera glabra Y.R.Li
- Illigera grandiflora W.W.Sm. & Jeffrey
- Illigera henryi W.W.Sm.
- Illigera khasiana C.B.Clarke
- Illigera luzonensis (C. Presl) Merr.
- Illigera madagascariensis H.Perrier
- Illigera megaptera Merr.
- Illigera nervosa Merr.
- Illigera novoguineensis Kubitzki
- Illigera orbiculata C.Y.Wu
- Illigera parviflora Dunn
- Illigera pentaphylla Welw.
- Illigera pierrei Gagnep.
- Illigera pseudoparviflora Y.R.Li
- Illigera pulchra Blume
- Illigera rhodantha Hance
- Illigera thorelii Gagnep.
- Illigera trifoliata (Griff.) Dunn
- Illigera vespertilio (Benth.) Baker f.
- Illigera villosa C.B.Clarke
