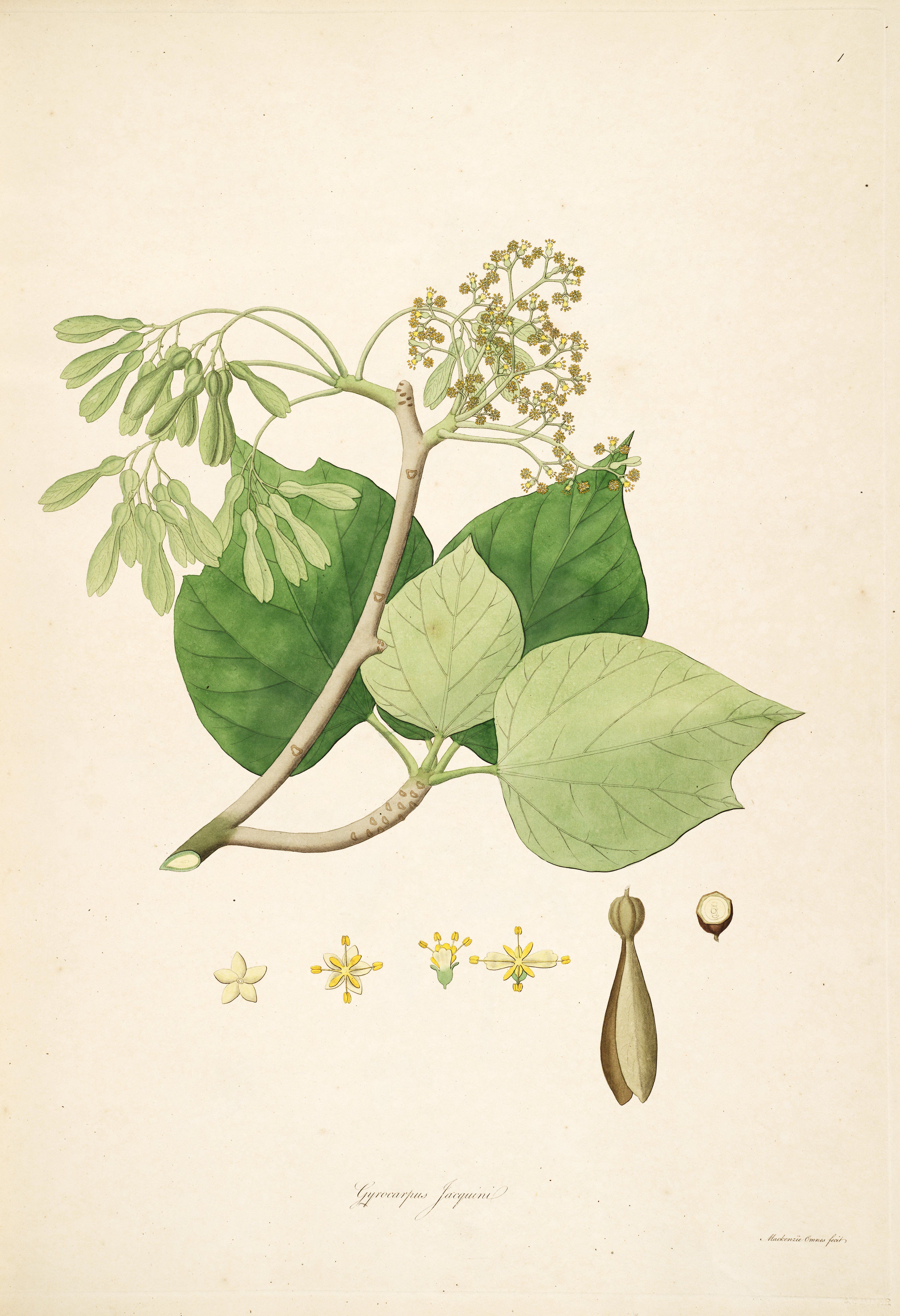
- Illustration of Gyrocarpus americanus by William Roxburgh, 1795

Scientific classification
- Kingdom: Plantae
- Clade: Tracheophytes
- Clade: Angiosperms
- Clade: Magnoliids
- Order: Laurales
- Family: Hernandiaceae
- Genus: Gyrocarpus; Jacq. (1763)

Species
- See text

= Gyrocarpus =

Genus of flowering plants

Gyrocarpus is a small genus of flowering plants in the Hernandiaceae family with a wide pantropical distribution.

== Species ==
Five species are accepted.

- Gyrocarpus americanus Jacq. – Pantropical
- Gyrocarpus angustifolius (Verdc.) Thulin – eastern Ethiopia, northern Kenya, and Somalia
- Gyrocarpus hababensis Chiov. – Eritrea, Djibouti, Ethiopia, Somalia, and northern Kenya
- Gyrocarpus jatrophifolius Domin – Mexico and Central America
- Gyrocarpus mocinoi Espejo – central and southern Mexico, Guatemala, and El Salvador
