= Johann Karl Wilhelm Illiger =

German entomologist and zoologist

- Born: 19 November 1775; Braunschweig, Germany
- Died: 10 May 1813 (aged 37); Berlin, Germany
- Scientific career
- Fields: Entomology; Zoology
- Workplaces: Zoological Museum in Berlin
- Author abbrev. (zoology): Illiger

Johann Karl Wilhelm Illiger (19 November 1775 – 10 May 1813) was a German entomologist and zoologist. He founded the entomological periodical Magazin für Insektenkunde. The plant genus Illigera is named in his honour.

== Biography ==
Illiger was the son of a merchant in Braunschweig. He studied under the entomologist Johann Hellwig, and later worked on the zoological collections of Johann Centurius Hoffmannsegg. He was educated at the University of Helmstedt and at Gottingen. He was unable to pursue medical studies due to tuberculosis. Illiger was invited to Berlin by Alexander von Humboldt and he became professor and director of the "zoological museum" (which is the Natural History Museum of Berlin in the present day) from its formation in 1810 until his death three years later from tuberculosis.

He was the author of Prodromus systematis mammalium et avium (1811), which was an overhaul of the Linnaean system. It was a major influence on the adoption of the concept of the family. He also edited the Magazin für Insektenkunde, widely known as "Illiger's Magazine". This journal would lead him to receive an honorary doctorate from the University of Kiel in 1806.

In 1811 he introduced the taxonomic order Proboscidea for elephants, the American mastodon and the woolly mammoth. He also described the subspecies Odobenus rosmarus divergens, commonly known as the Pacific walrus. He created the order Sirenia based on his opinion that the manatee appeared like a mermaid. Illiger's macaw (Primolius maracana; Vieillot, 1816) and Illiger's saddle-back tamarin (Leontocebus illigeri (Pucheran, 1845)) commemorate his name. The botanical genus Illigera (family Hernandiaceae) also bears his name.

== Published works ==
- "Beschreibung einiger neuer Käfer", in Schneider's entomologisches Magazin (1794) – Description of a new beetle.
- "Nachricht von einer in etlichten Gersten- und Haferfeldern um Braunschweig wahrscheinlich durch Insecten verursachten Verheerung", in Brauschweigisches Magazin 50 (1795) – News about barley and oat fields near Braunschweig likely devastated by insects.
- Verzeichniß der Käfer Preußens; outlined by Johann Gottlieb Kugelann (1798) – Directory of beetles found in Prussia.
- "Die Wurmtrocknis des Harzes", in Braunschweigisches Magazin 49–50 (1798) – Bark beetles found in resin.
- "Die Erdmandel", in Braunschweigisches Magazin 2 (1799) – The nutsedge.
- Versuch einer systematischen vollständigen Terminologie für das Thierreich und Pflanzenreich (1800) – About a systematic complete terminology for the animal and plant kingdoms.
- "Zusätze und Berichte zu Fabricius Systema Eleutheratorum", in Magazin für Insektenkunde 1. viii + 492 pp. (1802) – Additions and comments on Fabricius' "Systema Eleutheratorus".
- "Über die südamerikanischen Gürtelthiere", in Wiedemann's Archiv für die Zoologie (1804) – About the South American armadillo.
- "Die wilden Pferde in Amerika", in Braunschweigisches Magazin 7/(1805) – Wild horses in America.
- "Nachricht von dem Hornvieh in Paraguay in Südamerika", in Braunschweigisches Magazin 15–16 (1805) – On horned cattle of Paraguay.
- Nachlese zu den Bemerkungen, Berichtigungen und Zusätzen zu Fabricii Systema Eleutheratorum; Mag. fur Insektenkunde. 6:296–317 (1807) – Information regarding the comments, corrections and additions to Fabricius' "Systema Eleutheratorum".
- "Vorschlag zur Aufnahme im Fabricischen Systeme fehlender Käfergattungen", in Magazin für Insektenkunde 6:318–350 (1807).
- Prodromus Systematis Mammalium et Avium (1811).
- Überblick der Säugthiere nach ihrer Vertheilung über die Welttheile. Abh. K. Akad. Wiss. Berlin, 1804-1811: 39-159 (1815) – Overview of quadrupeds according to their distribution throughout the world.
