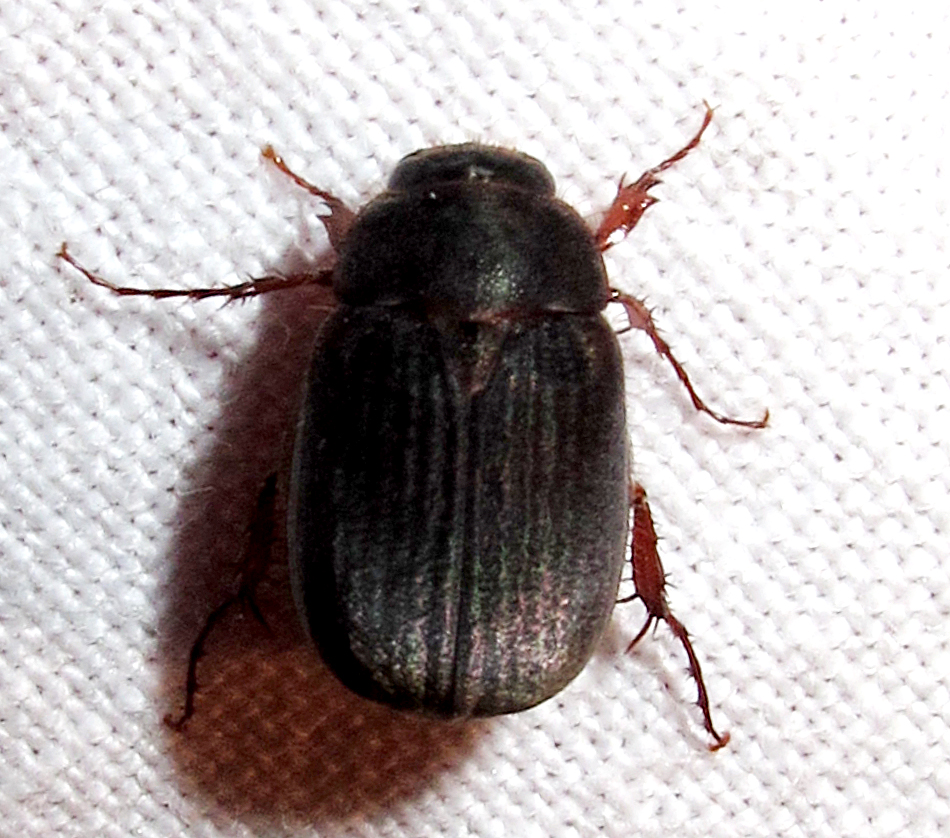

Scientific classification
- Kingdom: Animalia
- Phylum: Arthropoda
- Class: Insecta
- Order: Coleoptera
- Suborder: Polyphaga
- Infraorder: Scarabaeiformia
- Family: Scarabaeidae
- Genus: Serica
- Species: S. sericea

Binomial name
- Serica sericea (Illiger, 1802)

Synonyms
- Melolontha sericea Illiger, 1801; Melolontha chrysomelinus Gmelin, 1790

= Serica sericea =

Species of beetle

Serica sericea is a species of scarab beetle in the family Scarabaeidae. It is found in North America (Connecticut, Florida, Idaho, Indiana, Iowa, Kansas, Maine, Maryland, Massuchusetts, Missouri, Nebraska, New Hamsphire, New Jersey, New York, North Carolina, North Dakota, Ohio, Pennsylvania, South Dakota, Utah, Vermont, Virginia, Washington, Wisconsin, British Columbia, Manitoba, North West Territory, Ontario, Quebec, Saskatchewan).

== Description ==
Adults reach a length of about 7.5-10.5 mm. The colour is deep chestnut and the surface is velvety and opaque, with a brilliant metallic sheen of rainbow colours.
