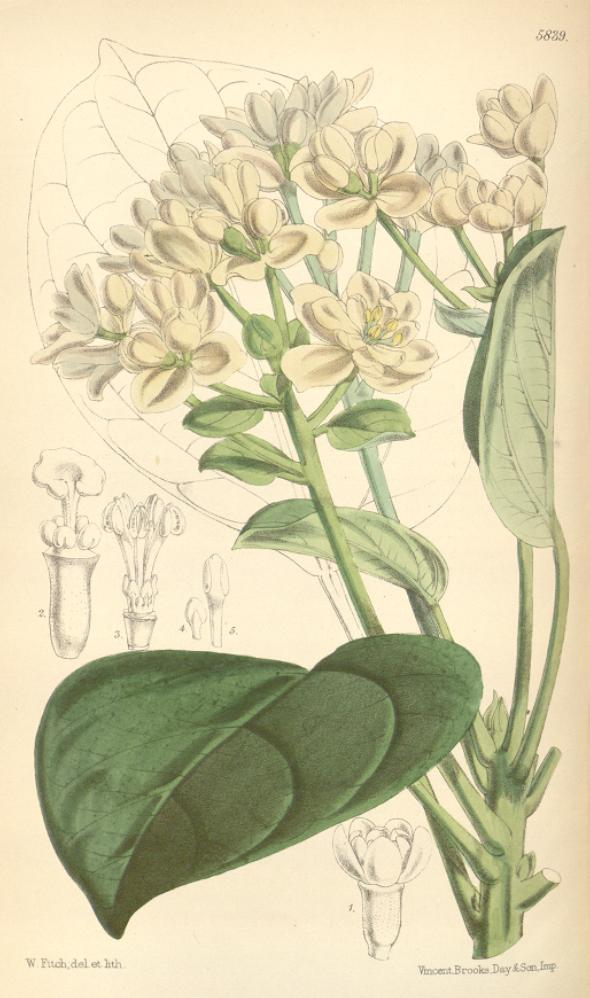
- Hernandia moerenhoutiana

Scientific classification
- Kingdom: Plantae
- Clade: Tracheophytes
- Clade: Angiosperms
- Clade: Magnoliids
- Order: Laurales
- Family: Hernandiaceae; Blume

Genera
- Gyrocarpus Jacq.; Hernandia Plum. ex L. (synonym Hazomalania Capuron); Illigera Blume; Sparattanthelium Mart.

= Hernandiaceae =

Family of flowering plants

The Hernandiaceae are a family of flowering plants (angiosperms) in the order Laurales. Consisting of four genera with about 58 known species, they are distributed over the world's tropical areas, some of them widely distributed in coastal areas, but they occur from sea level to over 2000 m.

The family is closely related to the Lauraceae, and many species inhabit laurel forest habitat; they have laurel-like (lauroid) leaves. Based on morphology, chromosome numbers, geographical distribution, and phylogenetic analyses, the family is clearly divided into two groups that have been given the rank of subfamilies Gyrocarpoideae and Hernandioideae.

== Overview ==
The Hernandiaceae are important components of tropical forests, ranging from low-lying to montane forests.

In general, there is a worldwide lack of knowledge about the family; little is yet known about its diversity. At a national level, in some countries with limited economic means, the majority of specimens are poorly determined or undetermined down to species. Recently-described species come from collections made in such countries. Trees of the family Hernandiaceae occur predominantly in the world's laurel forests and cloud forests, which occur in tropical, subtropical, and mild temperate regions of the Northern and Southern Hemispheres, especially in the African, Indian and Pacific Ocean islands, New Caledonia, Madagascar, and central Chile.

The main economic uses for this family are essential oils, found in many species that are important for spices and perfumes, and the hardwood of many species is a source for timber around the world. A great number of species are in danger of extinction due to overexploitation as medicinal plants, timber extraction and loss of habitat.

== Description ==
The family consists of trees, shrubs or lianas. The plants bear essential oils. The leaves are alternate, aromatic, simple or compound, palmately veined, cross-venulate. They are often peltate in Hernandia. Where the leaves are compound, they are palmately compound. The leaves are stipulate. There is a cork cambium present in the bark; in young growth, this is only superficial. The nodes are unilacunar.

The primary vascular tissue is arranged in a cylinder, without separate bundles. Cortical bundles are absent. Medullary bundles are absent. Internal phloem is absent. Secondary thickening develops from a conventional cambial ring, but included phloem is absent. The xylem has libriform fibres. Vessel elements are without vestured pits and end-walls are simple. The wood parenchyma is paratracheal. Sieve-tube plastids are type I and of the P-type.

== Taxonomy ==
The family has been recognised by most taxonomists. Gyrocarpus was considered in the Cronquist system to belong to a separate family, the Gyrocarpaceae. The APG IV system (2016) recognizes this family, and assigns it to the order Laurales in the clade Magnoliids. As circumscribed by APG, the family includes Gyrocarpus that sometimes have been treated as forming the family Gyrocarpaceae.

=== Genera ===
- Hernandiaceae
  - - Hernandia
    - Hazomalania
    - Illigera
  - - Sparattanthelium
    - Gyrocarpus

== Ecology ==
The Hernandiaceae species inhabit ecosystems with monoecious (rarely dioecious), deciduous or evergreen trees, shrubs, and perennial climbing plants. The mode of dispersion is variable among species. Most species of genus Hernandia have red fruit, suggesting zoochory, while Hernandia guianensis is hydrochorian in fresh water, and H. nymphaeifolia and Gyrocarpus americanus are hydrochorian in sea water.

Some fruits open very violently, expelling the seeds at some distance. Others are small nuts or non-fleshy bodies (achenes) provided with hooks or filaments that attach to the fur of animals, or are shaped to float in water or to facilitate transport by wind.

They are distributed in the lower areas of the tropics, especially in rain forests, cloud forests, and laurel forest, although some species exist even in subtropical or arid areas; they occur from sea level to over 2000 m. The relict character of distributions in Africa and the Americas, for example, from Gyrocarpus hababensis and G. americanus, appear to be due to marine intrusions in the past.

The family originated in the coastal laurel forests of Gondwana, which is the main factor in its pattern of distribution. The Hernandiaceae inhabit montane tropical forests, some species living 4,000 m above sea level, but most species are more frequently found in low-altitude rainforests. Some deciduous species have adapted to demanding conditions in semiarid climates; they tend to depend on favorable, perennial or transient, edaphic conditions. Examples of such conditions include perennial aquifers, periodic groundwater flows, or periodically flooded forests in sand substrates containing very low levels of nutrients.

== Description ==
The plants can have unisexual flowers (dioecious) or be monoecious. The inflorescence forms groups of small flowers in regular cymes. They present as the non-reproductive part of the flower (perianth) with a different corolla and calyx. Androecial members do not belong of the perianth and keeps in liberty of other, single-whorled. The pollen-producing reproductive organ (androecium) is only in fertile stamens. It also includes a variation which form of 1–2 nectariferous glands outside the stamens, the including staminodes. Staminodes in exterior to the stamens viable to reproduction (3–5); de sepals are opposite alternating with the inner perianth whorl (oppositisepalous). The anthers have dehiscing longitudinal valves. The wall of anther in seed of two cotyledons only one type. The pollen grains do not have aperture, constituted by 2 cells. The ovule production are given by gynoecium of one carpel, which are reduced in number related to the perianth. The pistil has only one ovule, the Gynoecium is also monomerous with only one carpel in inferior side. The placentation seems to be in an apex. The ovules form a testa from the outer integument (bitegmic), inverted so that the micropyle faces the placenta (anatropous), with two or more cell layers between the megasporophyte and the epidermal cells (crassinucellate) and pendulous. The endosperm formation is always from cells.

The fruit in some species is not fleshy with carpel indehiscent, seem to be with wings or included in a bloomed envelope derived from connate bracteoles. The seed without endosperm has two cotyledons with the appearance of flesh, oil producing, soft). The embryo is straight.

Hernandine, aporphine alkaloid from Hernandia

== Uses ==
In Samoa some species are used in traditional herbal medicine for a variety of uses, and one type is a piscicide.

Among the chemical compounds isolated from the family Hernandiaceae, the alkaloid corytuberine is the oldest known compound. Later, its derivative O,O-dimethylcorytuberine was reported from several Hernandia species, including H. nymphaeifolia. Actinodaphnine and hernandion, were the earliest chemical compounds reported from the family Hernandiaceae respectively.
