= Life stages of mites =

Mites start as an egg and then may pass through up to six instars: prelarva, larva, protonymph, deutonymph, tritonymph, and adult. These developmental stages may look different or may be omitted depending on the mite group. All mites have an adult stage; the female is the dispersal stage in some Mesostigmata and Prostigmata. Deutonymphs may also be the dispersal stage in Mesostigmata and Astigmata. The deutonymph is unspecialized or slightly specialized in Mesostigmata.

In Astigmata, the larva, protonymph, tritonymph, and adult are usually feeding ontogenetic stages, though exceptions occur, while the deutonymph serves for dispersal or survival in severe conditions, lacks mouthparts, and cannot feed (though non-oral feeding is possible in several taxa). Deutonymphs have many morphological specializations for phoresy, and they are strikingly different from other life stages.

== Identification ==
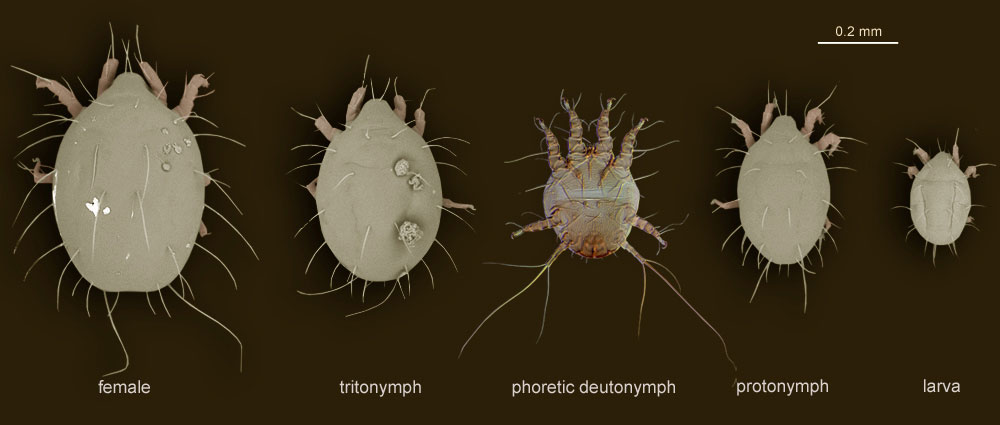
Life stages of Chaetodactylus krombeini (Astigmata). From left to right: adult female, tritonymph, phoretic deutonymph, protonymph, and larva. Egg, prelarva, and adult male not shown.

Life stages of Chaetodactylus krombeini (Astigmata). From left to right: adult female, tritonymph, phoretic deutonymph, protonymph, and larva. Egg, prelarva, and adult male not shown.

The life stages that are useful for identifying mites are adults and specialized dispersal stages called phoretic deutonymphs.

=== Identification of bee mites ===
The majority of mites found on an adult bee will be either a phoretic deutonymph or a female, both of which are useful for identification. In some Prostigmata that are permanent parasites, adult males and juveniles may also be found. An adult bee's internal tracheae or air sacs will be most likely to have adult mites, rather than the phoretic deutonymph. A bee nest will have all life stages, though relatively few phoretic deutonymph, which will be more likely to be on the bee itself. While adults, especially females, are the largest stage, the immature stages are usually more numerous in nests, and it is not always possible for non-acarologists to confidently distinguish adults (especially males) under a dissecting microscope.

== Prelarva ==
The prelarva is the first ontogenetic stage in mite development. In bee-associated mites, the prelarva is inactive, non-feeding, and sac-like (no legs or mouthparts). It develops inside the egg chorion where it consumes yolk and it molts into a larva. The prelarva is absent in Mesostigmata.

== Larva ==
The larva is an active, feeding instar invariably present in mite life cycles. After eclosion, larvae shed both prelarval skin and chorion. In most bee-associated mites, this is the first active stage. It is usually a weak, miniature stage, but in some groups, larvae are aggressive parasites (Parasitengona) or predators (family Cheyletidae). In contrast, in most Mesostigmata (e.g., Varroa), the larval stage is short-lived and non-feeding, sometimes remaining within the egg chorion.

=== Morphology ===
Mite larvae have three pairs of legs (for a total of six). Larvae lack functional external genital structures related to reproduction and oviposition. In taxa with genital papillae (Oribatida and Astigmata), larvae often have Claparède organs. Males of Locustacarus buchneri (Podapolipidae) are an exception: they are born sexually mature and have external genitals developed; in this species all larvae are females that can copulate with males but cannot lay eggs.

== Nymphal stages ==
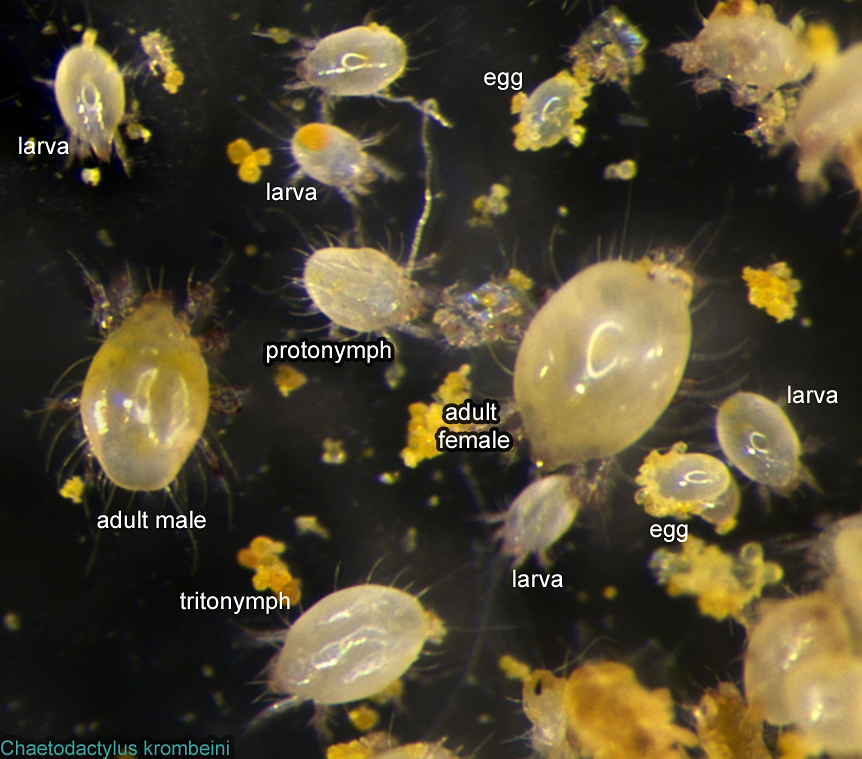
Cultured life stages (feeding stages only) of Chaetodactylus krombeini (Astigmata). Pollen grains visible.

There are three possible nymphal stages separated by molts: protonymph, deutonymph, and tritonymph. One of the stages may be either permanently or optionally suppressed, resulting in only two nymphal stages. Rarely, there is only one nymphal stage. Nymphal stages are suppressed in some Trombidiformes (Podapolipidae, Tarsonemidae, and Pyemotidae). A nymphal stage can be facultative, depending on particular circumstances.

=== In bee-associated mites ===
In bee-associated Astigmata, deutonymphs are heteromorphic with respect to other stages and may also be polymorphic. There are two types of deutonymphs for these taxa: (1) phoretic deutonymph, an active and typically non-feeding stage serving for attachment and dispersal on insect hosts; and (2) non-phoretic (or immobile) deutonymph, a highly regressive, cyst-like stage serving for survival in adverse conditions. The phoretic deutonymph is a facultative stage; it only appears when there is a need for dispersal. Many bees only use nests for a single generation, so mites feeding on pollen inside those nests are doomed unless they can disperse to other nests that have adult bees. The life cycle of mites is therefore synchronized with that of their bee hosts, and the dispersal stage appears when adult bees are about to emerge and leave the nest, thus dispersing mites to new nests. In bee-associated mites, non-phoretic deutonymphs are known only in Chaetodactylus and certain species of Glycyphagus and Acarus. In Chaetodactylus, which is associated with solitary bees constructing nests only for a single generation/season, the deutonymphs remain in the nest cavity waiting for the nest to be re-used by other bees rather than dispersing.

=== Morphology ===
Nymphs have four pairs of legs (for a total of eight) and lack functional external organs related to reproduction and oviposition. In some groups, the nymphal stages can only be distinguished by experts. In Oribatida, different nymphal stages can be relatively easily identified by the number of genital papillae: the protonymph has one pair, deutonymph two pairs, and tritonymph and adult three pairs. In Astigmata the protonymph has one pair of genital papillae, deutonymph two pairs, and tritonymph and adult two pairs. The deutonymph is phoretic and is very different from any other stage. It is easily identified by the presence of the attachment organ and the lack of functional mouthparts. A few taxa in the families Chaetodactylidae, Glycyphagidae, and Acaridae have non-phoretic, immobile deutonymphs. This stage is a featureless sack with greatly reduced legs, attachment organ, and mouthparts, and it usually stays under the protonymphal skin.

== Adult ==
The adult is a sexually mature stage that cannot molt anymore, though rare instances of adult molts are known.

=== Morphology ===
Adults have four pairs of legs (a total of eight) and functional external organs related to reproduction.

The exception is Locustacarus buchneri (Podapolipidae): this species' adult females have one pair of legs and the larviform males have three pairs (like the larva of many other mites). Larviform males of this species can copulate with larviform females, though only adult females lay eggs. The adult female has an ovipore, and the male has either an aedeagus, a gonopode, or a spermatopositor. A sperm access system not connected with the ovipore is present in Astigmata, Prostigmata (Tetranychidae), and some Parasitiformes (Dermanyssina and Heterozerconina). In these cases, the ovipore and copulatory opening are separate and disconnected.
