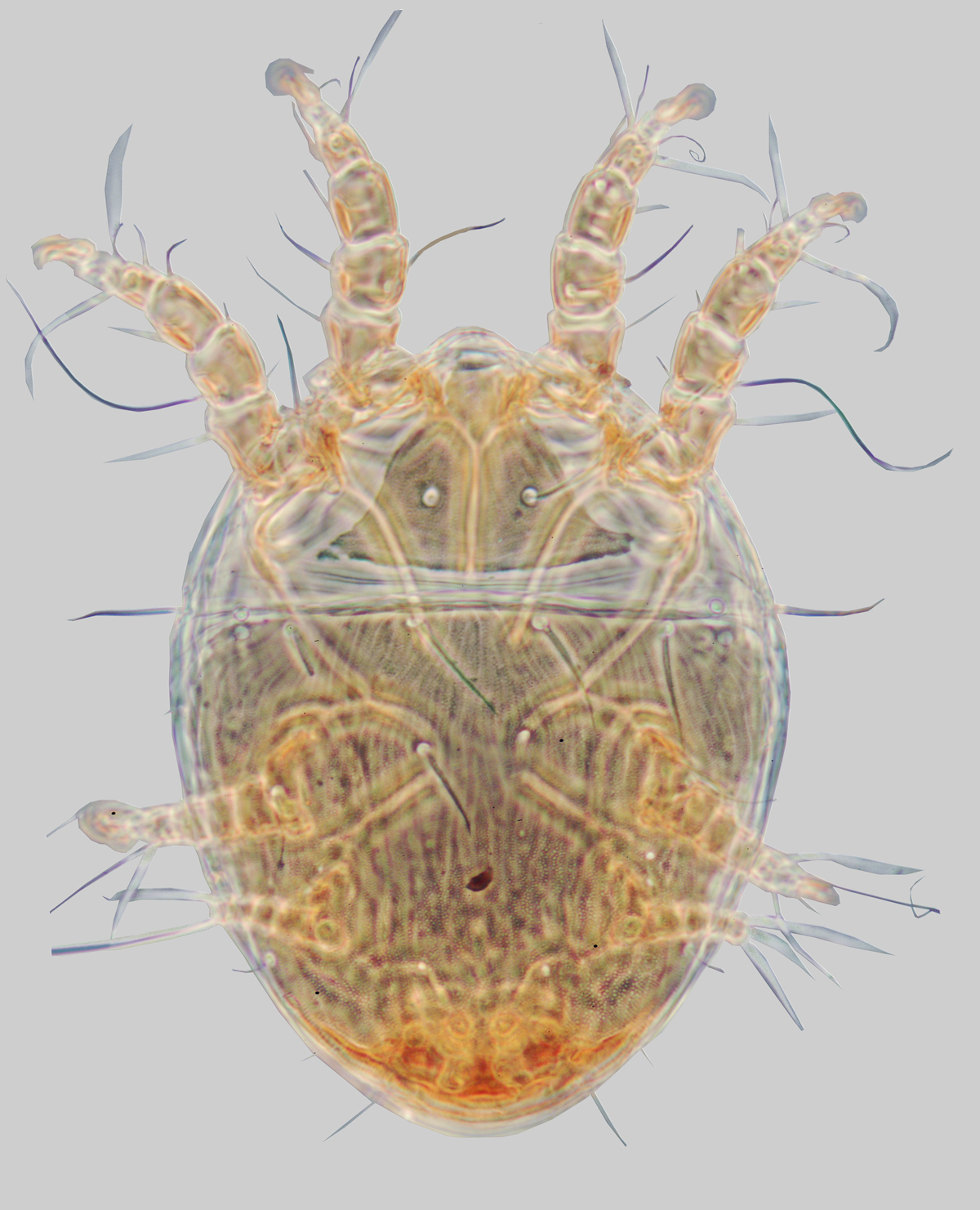
- Roubikia imberba phoretic deuteronymph

Scientific classification
- Kingdom: Animalia
- Phylum: Arthropoda
- Subphylum: Chelicerata
- Class: Arachnida
- Order: Oribatida
- Family: Chaetodactylidae
- Genus: Roubikia; O'Connor, 1993

= Roubikia =

Genus of mites

Roubikia is a genus of bee-associated mites occurring in the neotropics. They are mutualists or commensals, and feed on fatty acids from floral oils and most likely on fungi. The type species is Chaetodactylus panamensis.

== Description ==
Phoretic deutonymph: Gnathosomal solenidion and palp setae present and free palps absent. Coxal fields IV closed. Apodemes of ps1 partially fused anteriorly. Dorsal cuticular folds of ambulacra I-III weakly developed, with distal part smaller than proximal.

Adult: Supracoxal setae scx spiniform, with rounded tip.

Female: Spermatophores present. Inseminatory canal cylindrical, well sclerotized, protruding into spermatheca. Condylophores with short sclerotized portion and distinct proximal unsclerotized portion connected to the tarsus.

Male: Genital setae (g) represented by transparent disk . Genital setae distinctly (more than their diameter at base) anterior to progenital sclerites . Tarsal setae e III-IV absent. Setae s and w IV separated: w submedial, s subapical. Sclerotized portions of condylophores fused and incorporated into disto-ventral sclerotized tarsal wall. Pretarsal suckers not developed. Heteromorphic male present.

== Species identification ==
A dichotomous key to phoretic deutonymphs is available from the bee-associated mites website and Klimov and OConnor, 2008. Adults are known only from one species, Roubikia panamensis, and are described in Baker et al., 1987 and Klimov and OConnor, 2008.

== Hosts and host relations ==
Roubikia species are associated with apid bees of the genus Tetrapedia. They can be phoretic on Coelioxoides spp. (kleptoparasites of Tetrapedia) The feeding stages live in bee nests. As mutualists or commensals, they feed on nest materials, fatty acids from floral oils, and most likely, on fungi harmful to the bee larvae. Phoretic deutonymphs disperse on adult bees from one nest to another.

== Biology ==
This genus is exclusively associated with Tetrapedia (Apidae: Tetrapediini). Adults live in the bee nests, and deutonymphs disperse on the adult bees. Deutonymphs of Roubikia panamensis and R. imberba can also be found dispersing on kleptoparasitic bees of the genus Coelioxoides (Apidae: Tetrapediini). This kleptoparasitic 'cuckoo' bee does not build its own nests but uses nests of Tetrapedia as a resource for its brood. For Roubikia, Coelioxoides bees may serve as transport, dispersing the mites to different nests of Tetrapedia.

In Brazil, mites associated with Tetrapedia diversipes have been shown to be beneficial to the bee as the bee mortality rate in nests was inversely correlated to the level of mite infestation. The mites presumably feed on fungi harmful to the bee larvae inside the bee nests.

A single species, Roubikia latebrosa, is phoretic in the metasomal acarinarium of the host. Dispersal to unrelated host bees can be accomplished via phoresy on kleptoparasitic bees attacking the mite's principal hosts. Mites may disembark from the bees and attach to new host females at places where the bees collect loose dirt for nest material or forage.
