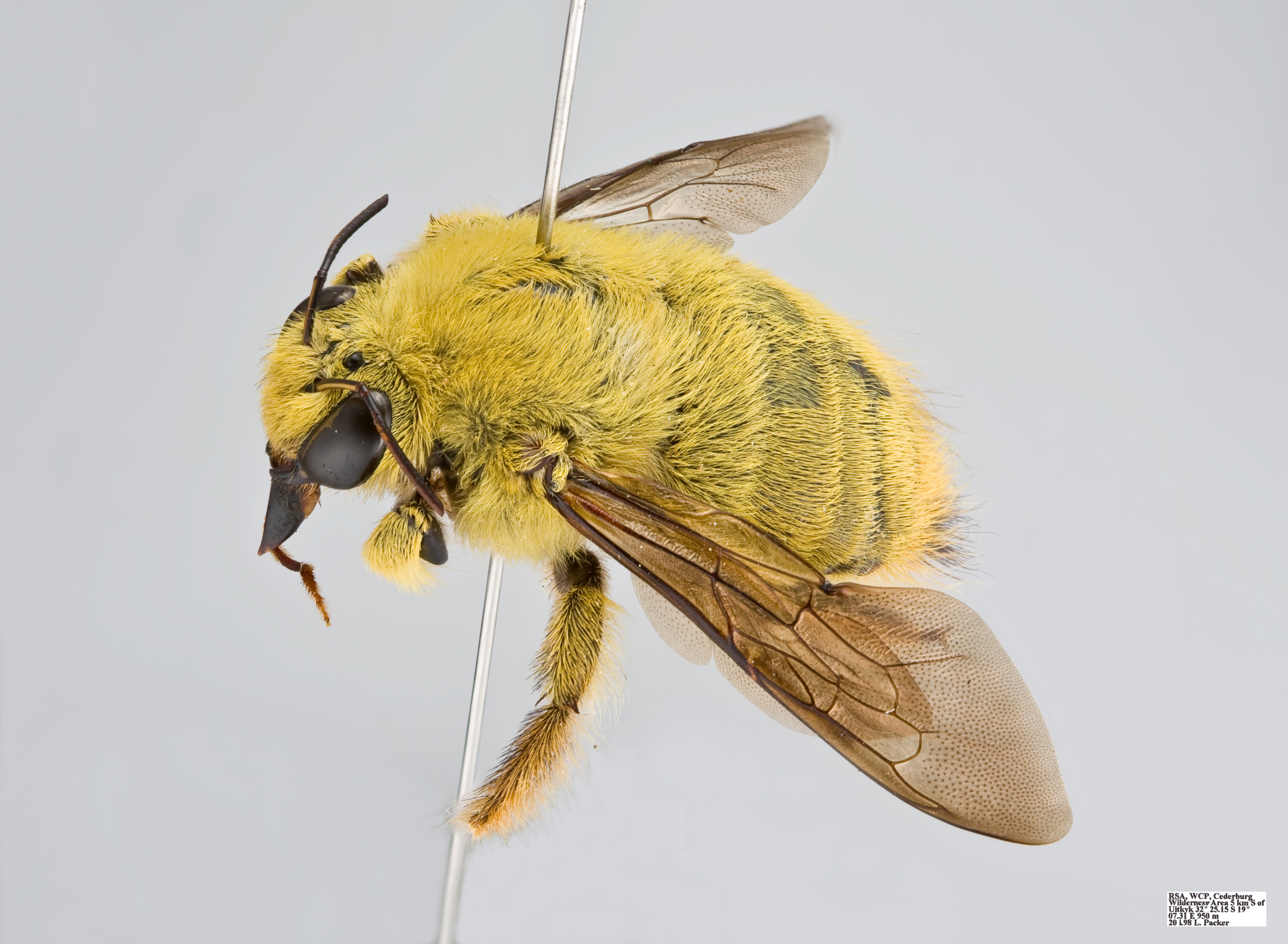
- Male

Scientific classification
- Kingdom: Animalia
- Phylum: Arthropoda
- Class: Insecta
- Order: Hymenoptera
- Family: Apidae
- Genus: Xylocopa
- Species: X. caffra

Binomial name
- Xylocopa caffra (Linnaeus 1767)

Synonyms
- X. mossambica Gribodo, 1894

= Xylocopa caffra =

Species of bee

Xylocopa caffra is a species of Afrotropical carpenter bee that ranges from west to central and southern Africa, besides Madagascar and some Indian Ocean archipelagos.

== Description ==
The females are black with two white or yellow bands over the hind thorax and first abdominal segment respectively, while the males are uniform greenish yellow in colour. Females with white bands are associated with dry climatic conditions during larval development, but females of either colour, or colour grade, may emerge from the same brood. In the Western Cape all have yellow bands however. A form with orange-red bands occurs in East Africa.

== Biology ==
The species is at home in various habitat types, from moist coastal settings to dry savannah. The territorial males patrol small areas around particular plants or flowers. The females are solitary nesters in Aloe or Agave stems, tree branches or timber. The nests are partitioned into various cells, separated by walls of glued wood residue. A wide variety of plants are used as sources of nectar and pollen.

As with other carpenter bees, the larvae are fed a mixture of pollen and nectar. The females have a mutualistic association with phoretic mites that are transported from nest to nest in an abdominal chamber, called the acarinarium. The mites feed on nest fungi that may otherwise infest the nectar and pollen provisions of the larvae.

They are parasitized by various biota including Anthrax, Coelopencyrtus, Dinogamasus, Hyperechia, Physocephala, Sennertia and Synhoria.

== Range ==
It has been recorded from Angola, Botswana, Cameroon, Central African Republic, Republic of the Congo, the Democratic Republic of the Congo, Ethiopia, Guinea, Kenya, Malawi, Mozambique, Somalia, South Africa, Namibia, Tanzania, Uganda, Zambia and Zimbabwe. In the Indian Ocean region it occurs in Madagascar, the Comoro Islands and Seychelles.

== Subspecies ==
It has two subspecies:

- X. c. caffra (Linnaeus, 1767)
- X. c. seychellensis (Cockerell, 1912)
