= Edward Ernest Green =

Sri Lankan-born British mycologist and entomologist

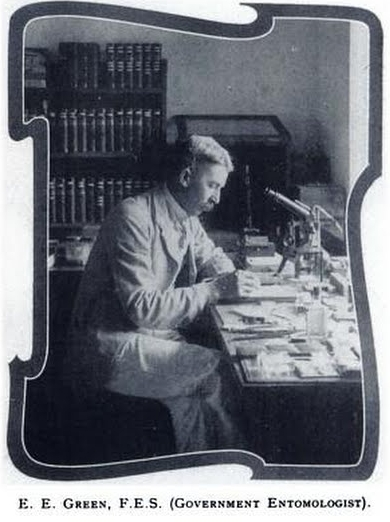
- Green in Sri Lanka, c. 1905
- Born: February 20, 1861; Colombo, Sri Lanka
- Died: July 2, 1949 (aged 88); Camberley
- Education: Charterhouse
- Known for: Specialised in the scale-insects, Coccidae
- Awards: Barclay Medal of the Asiatic Society
- Scientific career
- Fields: Mycologist and entomologist
- Institutions: Royal Entomological Society of London

Edward Ernest Green (20 February 1861 – 2 July 1949) was a Ceylon-born English mycologist and entomologist who specialised in the scale-insects, Coccidae. An accomplished artist, and lithographer, he illustrated the five volume Coccidae of Ceylon.

== Biography ==
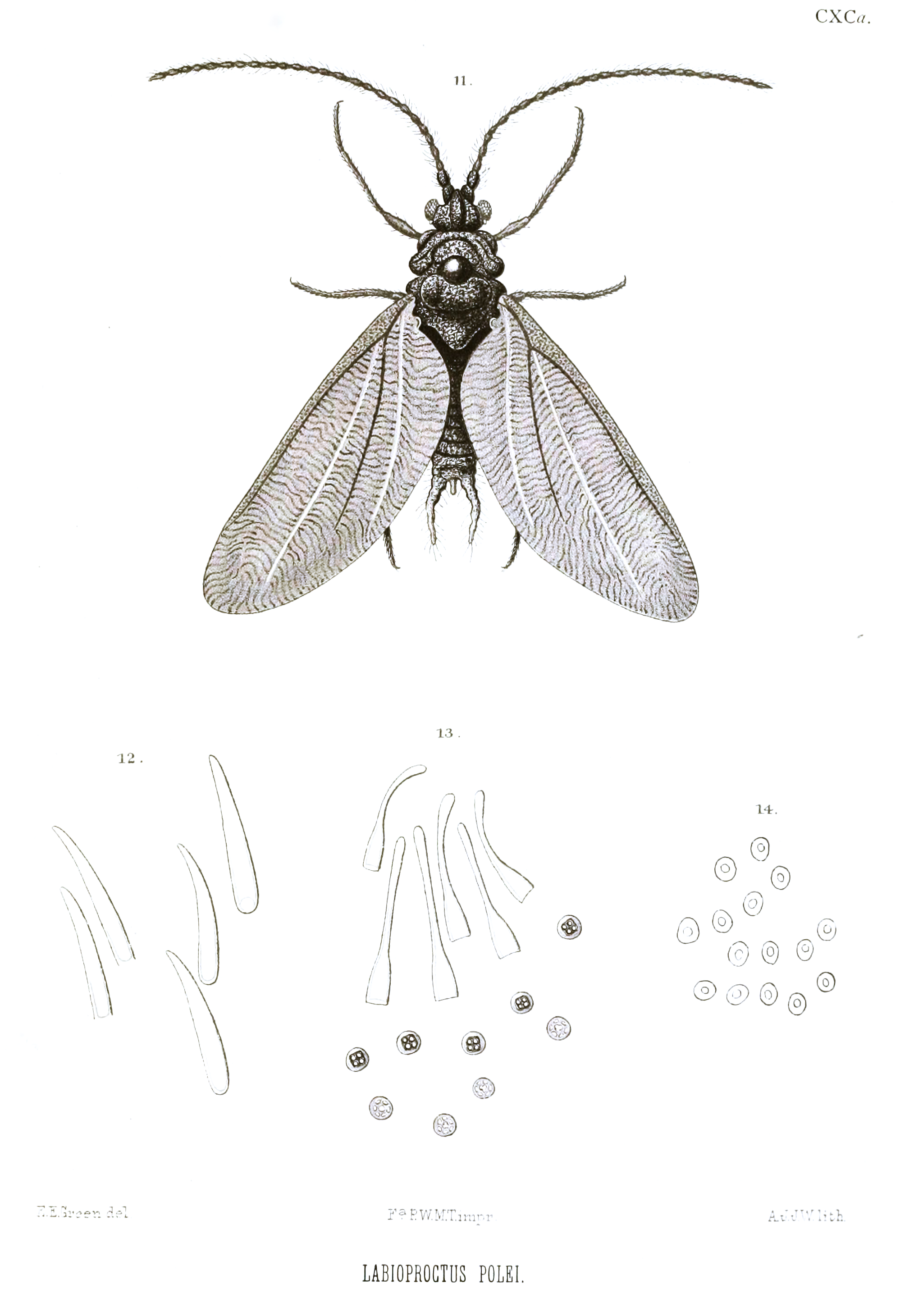
Illustration of Labioproctus polei by Green, 1922

Edward was born in Colombo, Sri Lanka to Jane Mary née Akers (d. 1863) and John Philip Green who owned coffee and tea plantations in Ceylon. His paternal grandfather Philip James Green was Consul-General for Ceylon. An uncle, Staniforth Green was a partner of the German planter and entomologist John Nietner and had hosted Ernst Haeckel and corresponded with entomologists like J.O. Westwood. After schooling at Charterhouse, Edward returned to the family plantations at Pundaluoya in 1880 and became familiar with the ravages of Hemileia vastatrix and Coccus viridis which were to cause the end of coffee cultivation in Ceylon. He met Harry Marshall Ward who was in Ceylon to study the coffee rust and conducted his own studies on Coccus viridis which he published in 1886 and wrote another influential paper on the Insect Pests of Tea in 1890. Around the same time, he went to study under T.H. Huxley at the Royal College of Science in Kensington. Returning to Ceylon he was later invited by the Planters' Association to visit estates and provide advice. This led to travel around Ceylon and Southern India, although this was entirely voluntary and this led to him being appointed "honorary entomologist" of Ceylon in 1897. In 1899 he was made a Government Entomologist with his office in the Royal Botanical Gardens, Peradeniya. He retired and moved to England in 1913. He moved to Camberley where he lived in Way's End and continued his research on scale insects of which he had made a large collection.

Green was awarded the Barclay Medal of the Royal Asiatic Society of Bengal in 1901. Green served as a president of the Royal Entomological Society of London in 1923-24 and as a vice-president (1915, 1925). He married Edith Mary, daughter of Alfred Burnaby Antram in 1891 and they had two sons and a daughter. His specimen collections were donated to the Natural History Museum (BMNH) after he feared damage from bombing during the Second World War. The collection donated in 1940 included 6505 slides and 2172 boxes of dry specimens. He died in Camberley in 1949.

== Contributions to entomology ==
Green's major writings include The Coccidae of Ceylon, that was published by Dulau & Co. in London (five volumes 1896–1922), as well as over 200 other papers. The originals of his paintings are in the Natural History Museum in London. Green's collection of Heteroptera from Ceylon is in the Indian Museum in Calcutta. His Microlepidoptera and Coleoptera from Ceylon are in the Natural History Museum in London. Green collected specimens of various other taxa which were sent to experts in England and Europe. The frog species Fejervarya greenii was named after him by G.A. Boulenger in 1905 while a dragonfly Platysticta greeni was named after him by Kirby in 1891. A mite genus Greenia was named in his honour by A.C. Oudemans in 1902, however this is now treated as a synonym of Dinogamasus. The type species Greenia perkinsi was described as a symbiont found in the acarinarium of Xylocopa tenuiscapa.

Illustrations by Green

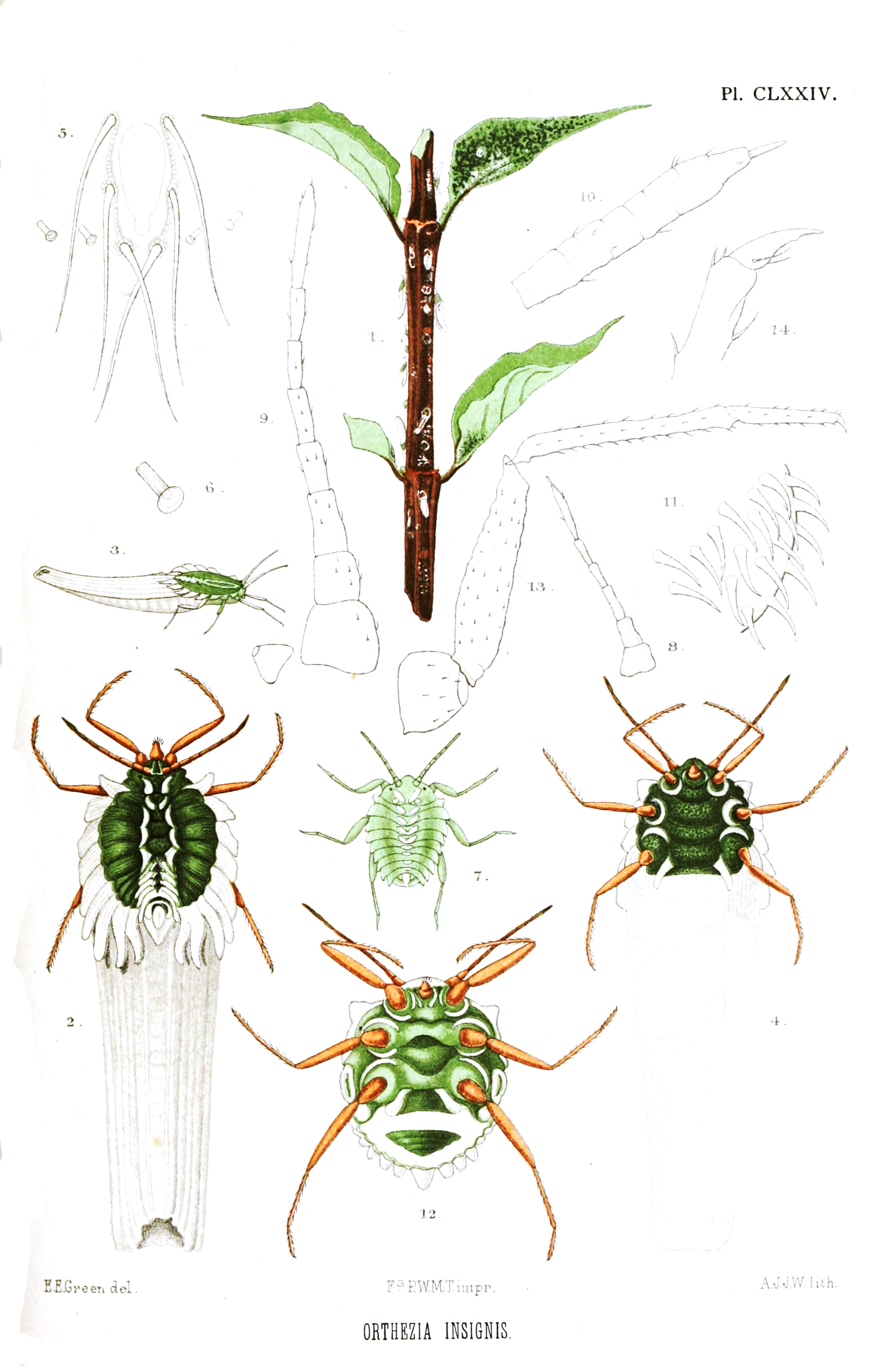
Orthezia insignis

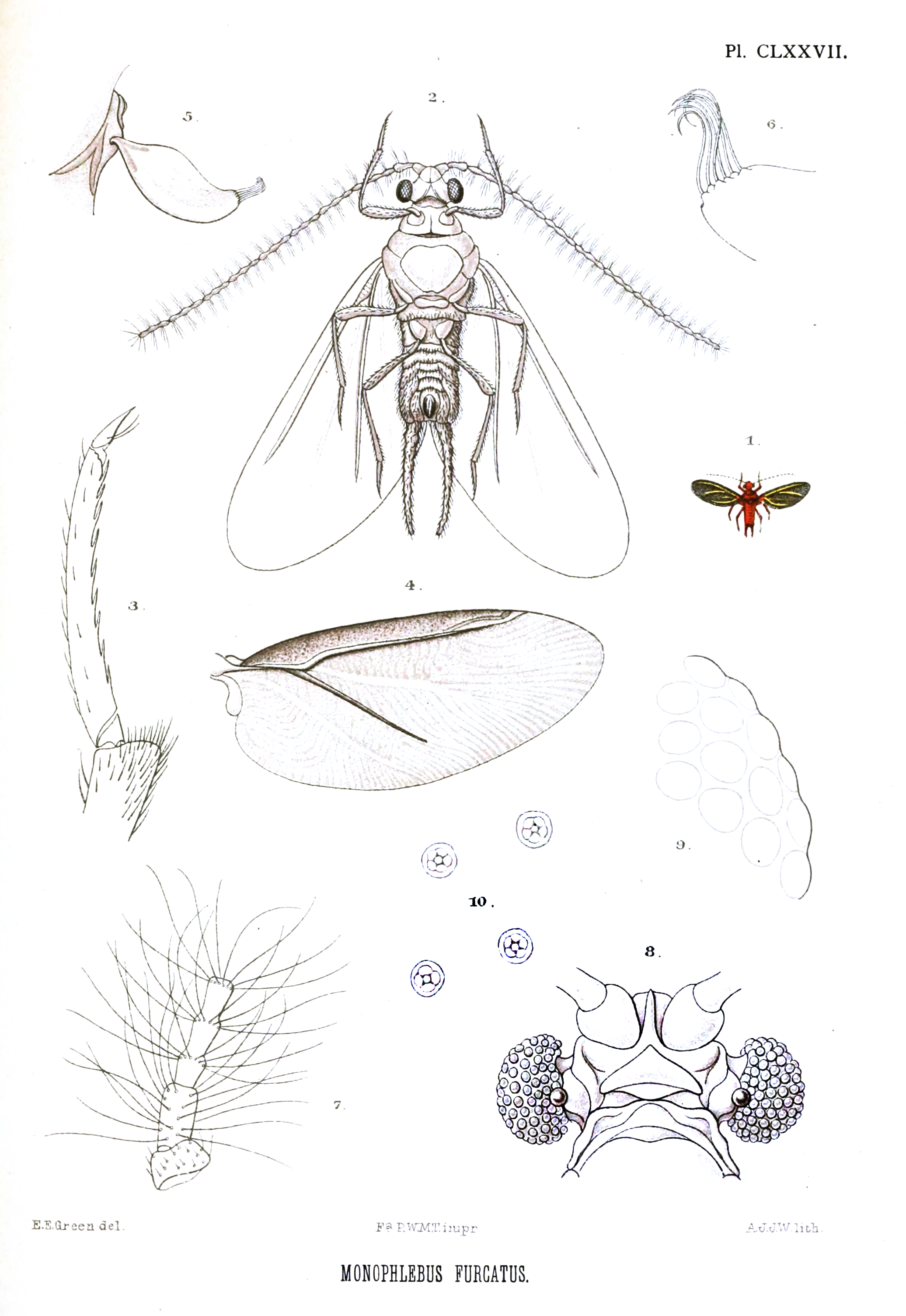
Monophlebus furcatus

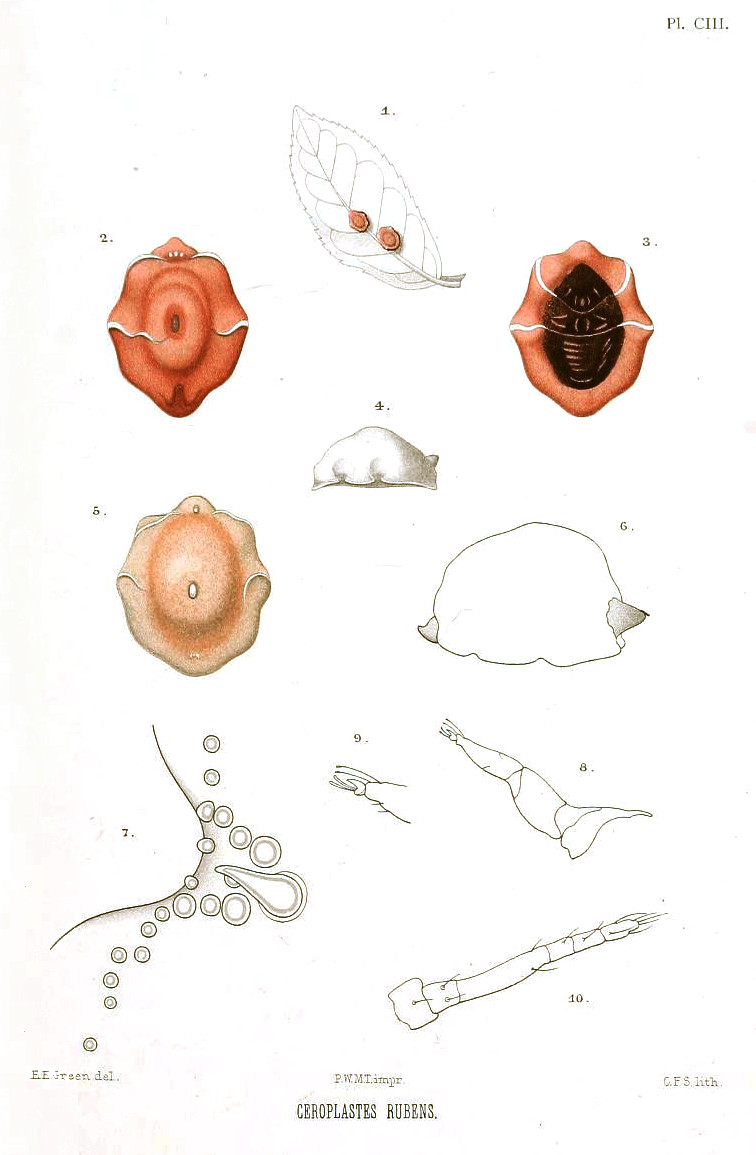
Ceroplastes rubens
