= Bombus hypocrita =

Scientific classification
- Kingdom: Animalia
- Phylum: Arthropoda
- Class: Insecta
- Order: Hymenoptera
- Family: Apidae
- Genus: Bombus
- Species: B. hypocrita

Binomial name
- Bombus hypocrita Pérez, 1905

Synonyms
- Bombus ignitus var hypocrita Pérez, 1905

Species of bumblebee

Bombus hypocrita, also known as the short-tongued bumblebee, is a Japanese bumblebee commonly used in commercial pollination. These short-tongued bumblebees have a proboscis about 7-9mm long, which is folded under their head when flying. Bumblebees are a small fuzzy insect with yellow and black banding along their abdomen. They are round and covered in pile, the hair-like structures that give them their distinct fuzzy appearance.

== Distribution and habitat ==
Bombus hypocrita is one of the most common native bumblebees found in Japan, and can be found throughout all of Japan. B. hypocrita prefer to forage in open, sunny areas and nest underground, often in abandoned rodent dens. B. hypocrita are able to travel over 800 meters foraging for food.

== Behaviour ==
Bumblebees are common commercial pollinators, as they are able to pollinate effectively using a technique called buzz-foraging. Buzz-foraging is when the Bumblebee lands on the anther of the flower and rapidly vibrates their whole body to get as much of the pollen on their body as possible. This allows them to be effective pollinators even for plants like tomatoes who have flowers that do not produce nectar.

=== Mating ===
Bombus hypocrita have very similar reproductive cycles as most other bumblebees with one queen and her colony of male and female worker bees. They have been observed scent-marking flowers and there have been indications that this scent marking plays an important role in premating reproductive isolation. Queens will oviposit 7-10 eggs in wax cells, which can then either hatch without fertilization, resulting in haploid males, or become fertilized, producing diploid females.

=== Diet ===
The main source of food is the nectar of flowering herbs and shrubs, preferring flowers with wide or shallow faces such as roses, squash flowers, or morning glories. It has been speculated that these bumblebees visit squash flowers to help facilitate reproduction in the colony.

== Threats to the population ==
=== Pesticides ===
Bumblebees are incredibly beneficial to the environment and agricultural industries. Unfortunately there is always risk for insects that live or forage in agricultural crops because of pesticides. The four common ones used in Japan are Mosplian, Kingbo, Score, and Lvrtong. While the short-tongued bumblebee is more resistant to these pesticides than other native species in Japan, they still suffer negative effects from them, such as decreased effectiveness in foraging up to death.

=== Invasive Species ===
B. hypocrita is one of the bumblebee species used in commercialization in Japan. After the introduction of Bombus terrestris into their ecosystem, they have started to diminish. This is because B. terrestris has an almost identical foraging season, and forages on similar flowers as B. hypocrita. B. terrestris has also been found to be mating with and inseminating the queens of B. hypocrita. B. hypocrita and B. terrestris have only been able to produce offspring in laboratory settings and all resulting children are inviable, or sterile. Hybridized offspring have not been found in the wild, though B. terrestris do inseminate B. hypocrita. The cross insemination between species only further results in the decline of B. hypocrita since their queens only copulate once or twice. B. hypocrita has its own natural parasites like the mite, but with the global commercialization of B. terrestris, other species of mites have begun to invade their habitat, increasing their risk for decline.

However, in laboratory conditions queens from B. hypocrita are able to increase their number of offspring when supplied with workers from B. terrestris. Up to twice as many worker bees were produced when the queen was given helper bees from the invasive species.
