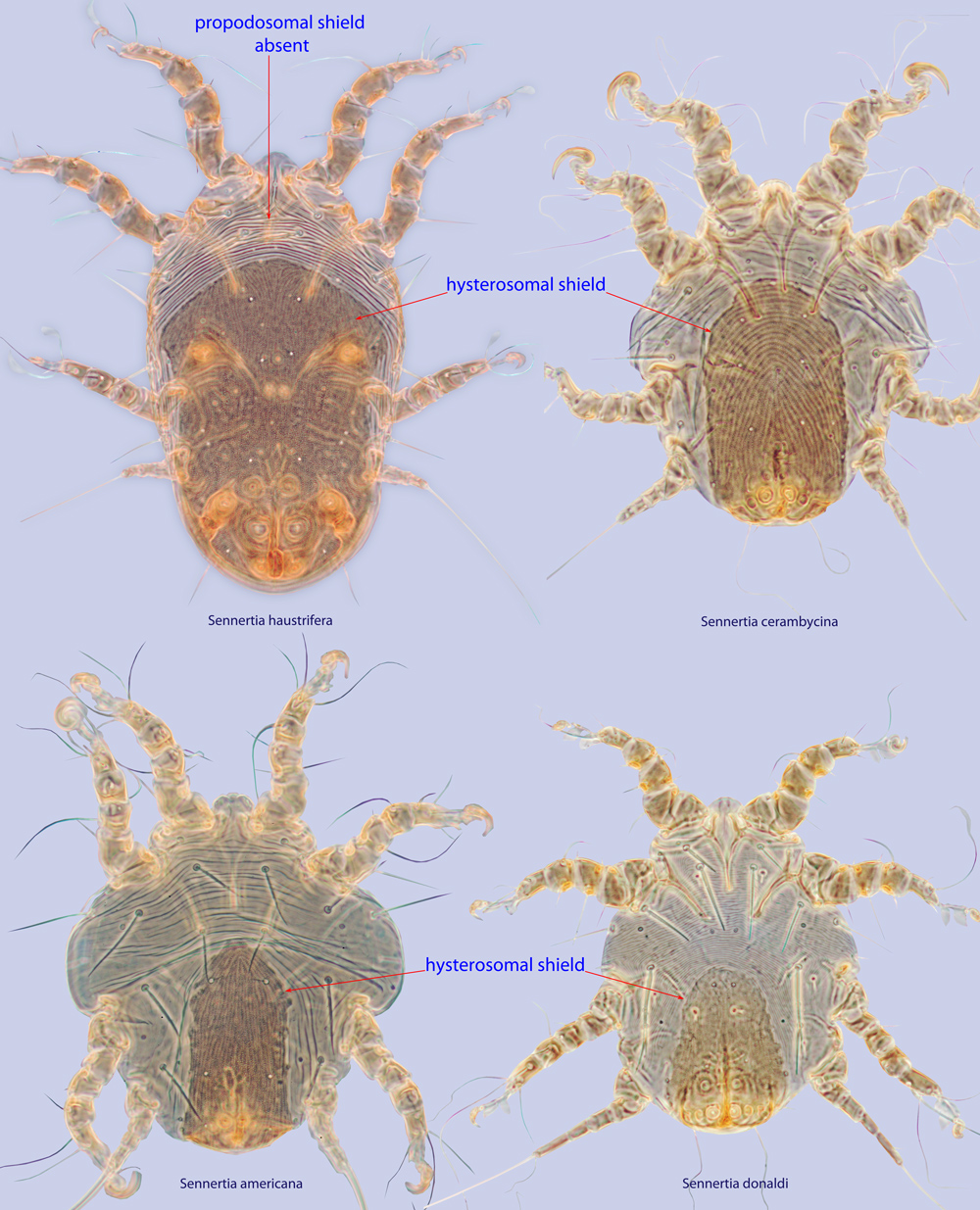
- Hysterosomal shield on 4 species of Sennertia

Scientific classification
- Kingdom: Animalia
- Phylum: Arthropoda
- Subphylum: Chelicerata
- Class: Arachnida
- Order: Oribatida
- Family: Chaetodactylidae
- Genus: Sennertia; Oudemans, 1905

= Sennertia =

Genus of mites

Sennertia is a genus of mites in the Chaetodactylidae family. There are more than 70 species. Some of these mites are parasites or commensals of bees, but the presence in some bees of specialized structures for carrying mites (acarinarium) indicates the mutualistic nature of the relationship of some species (Sennertia sayutara, Sennertia devincta). Most species of the genus Sennertia settle on adult bees as heteromorphic deutonymphs, but the species Sennertia vaga has no deutonymph and settle on adult bees in the eating adult stages. Reproduction and feeding occurs during resettlement. Most species occur on small carpenter bees (Ceratina) and large carpenter bees (Xylocopa) of the family Apidae. A few species (Sennertia vaga-group) are associated with Centris (Paracentris) in the Neotropics.

== Distribution ==
Sennertia are found worldwide, except for in the Antarctic. (The species Sennertia antarctica is likely erroneously named, as the species of bee it parasitizes is not found in the Antarctic).

== Species ==
There are 6 subgenera and more than 70 species. The genus was discovered by the Dutch zoologist A.K. Udemans (Anthonie Cornelis Oudemans; 1858—1943).

- Sennertia aldeodadi - Haitlinger, 2000
- Sennertia alfkeni - Oudemans, 1900 (=Sennertia japonica (Oudemans, 1900))
- Sennertia americana - Delfinado and Baker, 1976
- Sennertia antarctica - Trägårdh, 1907
- Sennertia argentina - Vitzthum, 1941
- Sennertia augustii - Alzuet and Abrahamovich, 1990
- Sennertia basilewskyi - Fain, 1974
- Sennertia benoiti - Fain, 1974
- Sennertia bifida - Kurosa, 2003
- Sennertia bifilis - (Canestrini, 1897)
- Sennertia caffra - Vitzthum, 1919
- Sennertia cantabrica - Zachvatkin, 1941
- Sennertia capensis - Fain, 1971
- Sennertia cerambycina - (Scopoli, 1763)
- Sennertia ceratinarum - Fain, 1974
- Sennertia congoicola - Fain, 1971
- Sennertia dalyi - Fain, 1980
- Sennertia dalyi nilotica - Fain, 1980
- Sennertia delfinadoae - Fain, 1981 (=Sennertia bakeri Ramaraju and Mohanasundaram, 2001)
- Sennertia devincta - Klimov and OConnor, 2007
- Sennertia dissimilis - Zachvatkin, 1941
- Sennertia donaldi - Turk, 1948
- Sennertia duweinii - Sherbef and Duweini, 1980
- Sennertia egyptiaca - Elbadry, 1971
- Sennertia elseni - Fain, 1971
- Sennertia faini - Baker and Delfinado-Baker, 1983
- Sennertia flabellifera - Oudemans, 1924
- Sennertia frontalis - Vitzthum, 1941
- Sennertia gargantua - Zachvatkin, 1941
- Sennertia greeni - Oudemans, 1917
- Sennertia haustrifera - Klimov and OConnor, 2008
- Sennertia herminae - Haitlinger, 1999
- Sennertia hipposideros - Oudemans, 1902
- Sennertia horrida - Vitzthum, 1912 ( equivalent to Sennertia sumatrensis Oudemans, 1924; Sennertia leucothorae Ramaraju and Mohanasundaram, 2001)
- Sennertia hurdi - Klimov and OConnor, 2008
- Sennertia ignota - Delfinado and Baker, 1976
- Sennertia indica - Delfinado and Baker, 1976
- Sennertia jeanalexi - Fain, 1971
- Sennertia koptorthosomae - Oudemans, 1901
- Sennertia latipilis - Fain, 1974
- Sennertia lauta - Klimov and OConnor, 2007
- Sennertia leclercqi - Fain, 1971
- Sennertia leei - Fain, 1982
- Sennertia longipilis - Alzuet and Abrahamovich, 1987
- Sennertia loricata - Klimov and OConnor, 2008
- Sennertia lucrosa - Klimov and OConnor, 2008
- Sennertia madagascarensis - Fain, 1971
- Sennertia mesotrichia - Fain, 1971
- Sennertia micheli - Fain, 1971
- Sennertia monicae - Fain, 1971
- Sennertia morstatti - Vitzthum 1914 (=Sennertia moandensis Fain, 1971)
- Sennertia oudemansi - Zachvatkin, 1941
- Sennertia perturbans - Vitzthum, 1919
- Sennertia pirata - Klimov and OConnor, 2008
- Sennertia potanini - Zachvatkin, 1941
- Sennertia queenslandica Womersley, 1941
- Sennertia ratiocinator - Klimov and OConnor, 2007
- Sennertia recondita - Klimov and OConnor, 2008
- Sennertia robusta - Delfinado and Baker, 1976 (=Sennertia carpenteri Ramaraju and Mohanasundaram, 2001)
- Sennertia roepkei - Oudemans, 1924
- Sennertia sayutara - Klimov and OConnor, 2007
- Sennertia scutata - Fain, 1974
- Sennertia segnis - Klimov and OConnor, 2008
- Sennertia shimanukii - Baker and Delfinado-Baker, 1983
- Sennertia simplex - Trägårdh, 1904
- Sennertia sodalis - Klimov and OConnor, 2008
- Sennertia spinifera - Fain, 1974
- Sennertia splendidulae - Alzuet and Abrahamovich, 1989
- Sennertia surinamensis - Fain and Lukoschus, 1971
- Sennertia tanythrix - Fain, 1971
- Sennertia tunisiana - Fain, 1980
- Sennertia vaga - Klimov and OConnor, 2008
- Sennertia vanderhammeni brevipilis - Fain, 1974
- Sennertia vanderhammeni - Fain, 1974
- Sennertia varicosa - Fain, 1971
- Sennertia vitzthumi - Fain, 1981
- Sennertia zhelochovtsevi - Zachvatkin, 1941
