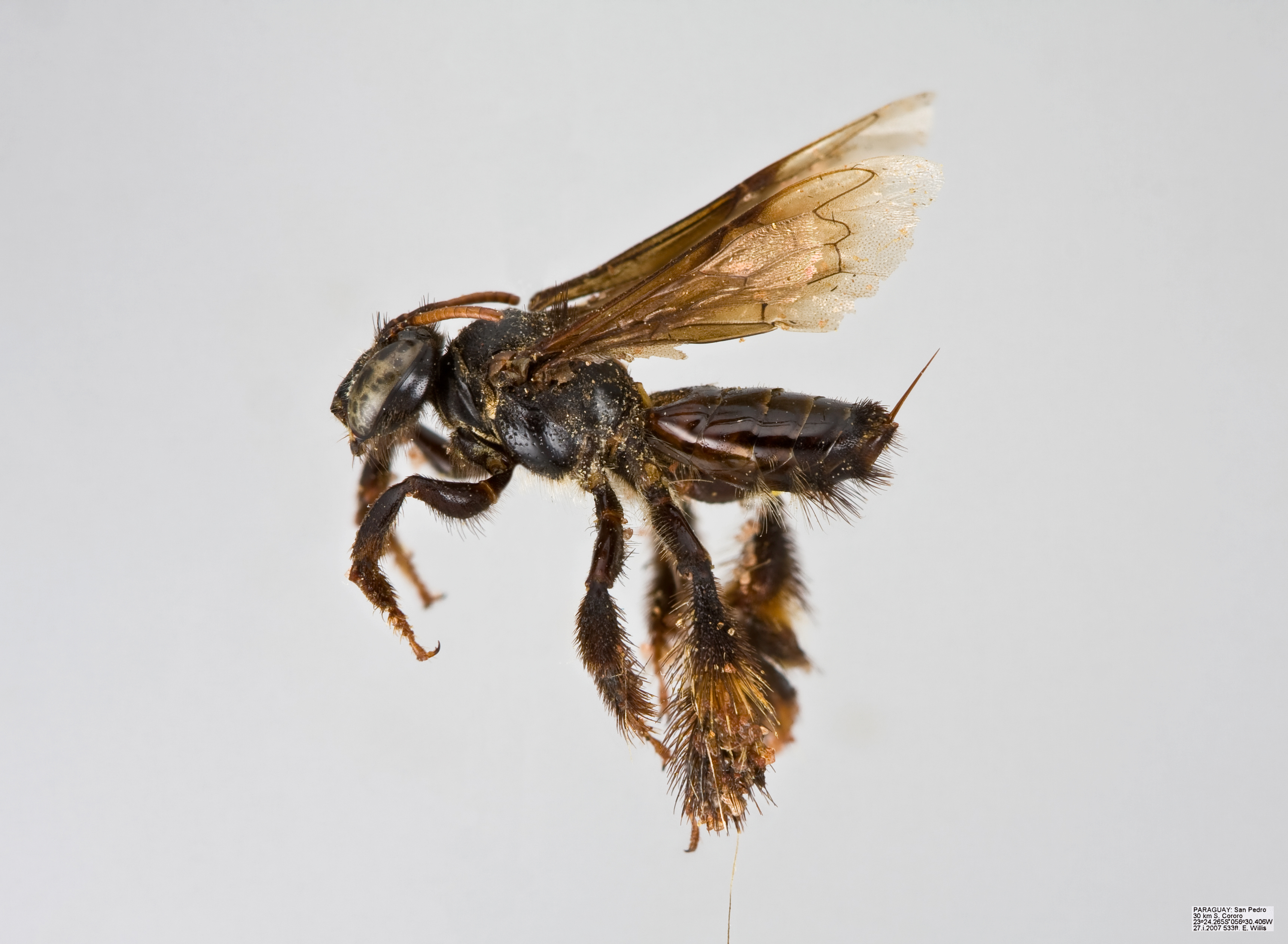
- Tetrapedia sp. (female)

Scientific classification
- Kingdom: Animalia
- Phylum: Arthropoda
- Class: Insecta
- Order: Hymenoptera
- Family: Apidae
- Tribe: Tetrapediini
- Genus: Tetrapedia; Klug, 1810

Species
- ~13 species

Synonyms
- Tetrapedium Berthold, 1827; Lagobata Smith, 1861; Tetrapaedia Dalla Torre, 1896

= Tetrapedia (bee) =

Genus of bees

The genus Tetrapedia contains approximately 13 species of small apid bees occurring in the Neotropics (from Mexico to Argentina), and they are unusual in possessing adaptations for carrying floral oils rather than (or in addition to) pollen or nectar. The floral oils are typically gathered from plants of the family Malpighiaceae, though other plants may be visited. They also gather plant resins for use in nest cell construction, sometimes mixed with sand.

They are small bees (8–13 mm), generally black in color, though they may have yellow faces.

== Species ==
The following species are in the genus Tetrapedia:

- Tetrapedia albodecorata Moure, 1999
- Tetrapedia alfkeni Cockerell, 1914
- Tetrapedia amplitarsis Friese, 1899
- Tetrapedia atripes Smith, 1854
- Tetrapedia basalis Smith, 1879
- Tetrapedia bipartita Moure, 1999
- Tetrapedia clypeata Friese, 1899
- Tetrapedia curvitarsis Friese, 1899
- Tetrapedia diversipes Klug, 1810
- Tetrapedia garofaloi Moure, 1999
- Tetrapedia helvola Moure, 1999
- Tetrapedia hemileuca Moure, 1999
- Tetrapedia hypoleuca Moure, 1999
- Tetrapedia imitatrix Moure, 1999
- Tetrapedia longipes Vachal, 1909
- Tetrapedia maura Cresson, 1879
- Tetrapedia melampoda Moure, 1999
- Tetrapedia nigropilosa Moure, 1999
- Tetrapedia ornata (Spinola, 1853)
- Tetrapedia peckoltii Friese, 1899
- Tetrapedia pulchella Moure, 1999
- Tetrapedia pyramidalis Friese, 1899
- Tetrapedua rugulosa Friese, 1899
- Tetrapedia rutilipes Vachal, 1909
- Tetrapedia spanosticta Moure, 1999
- Tetrapedia xanthorrhina Moure, 1999
