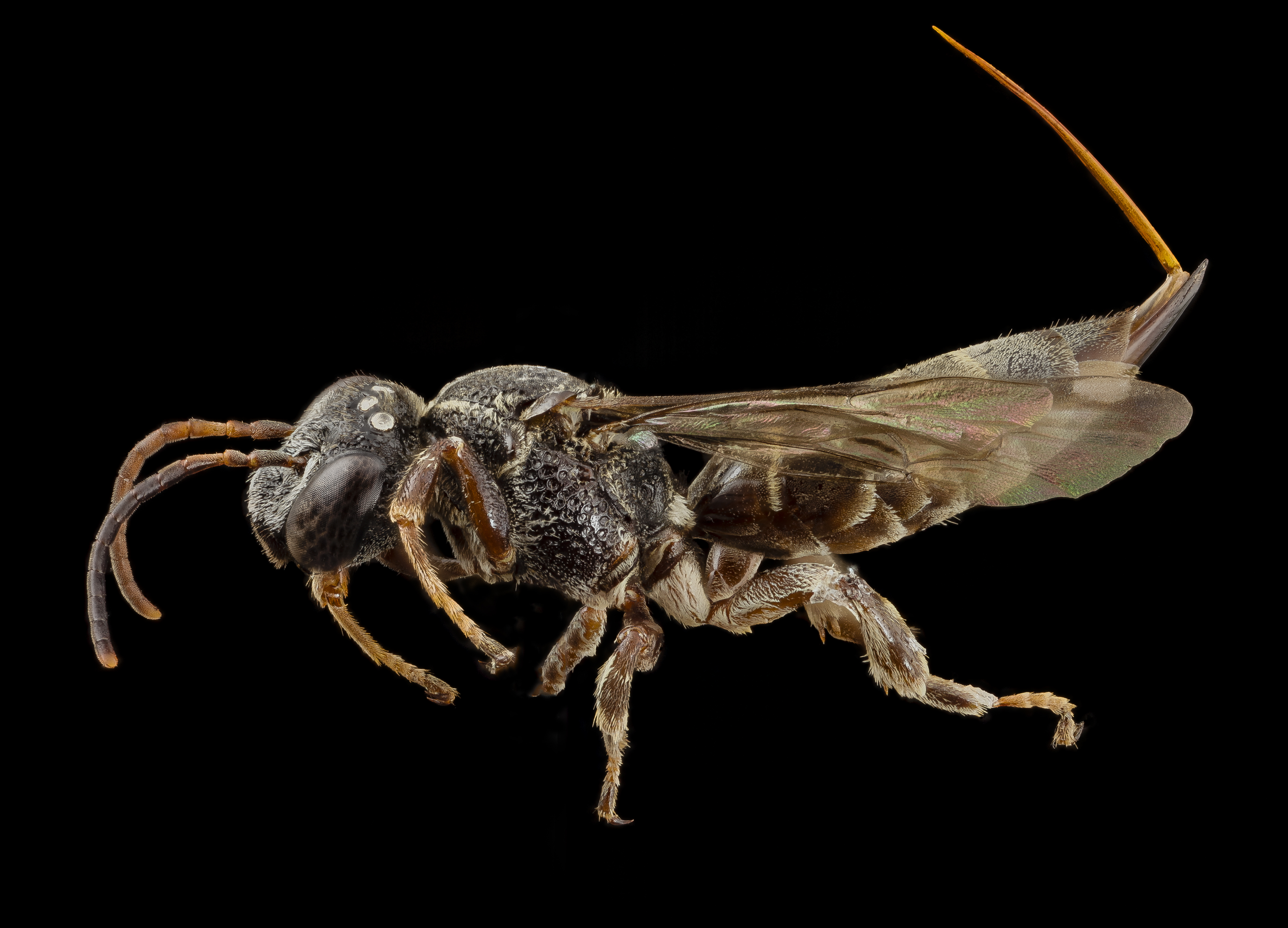
- Coelioxoides waltheriae

Scientific classification
- Kingdom: Animalia
- Phylum: Arthropoda
- Clade: Pancrustacea
- Class: Insecta
- Order: Hymenoptera
- Family: Apidae
- Subfamily: Apinae
- Tribe: Tetrapediini
- Genus: Coelioxoides; Cresson, 1879

= Coelioxoides =

Genus of bees

Coelioxoides is a genus of apid bees. They are found in North and South America.

== Species ==
The following species belong to the genus Coelioxoides:

- Coelioxoides exulans (Holmberg, 1887)
- Coelioxoides piscicauda Rocha-Filho, 2017
- Coelioxoides punctipennis Cresson, 1879
- Coelioxoides waltheriae Ducke, 1908
