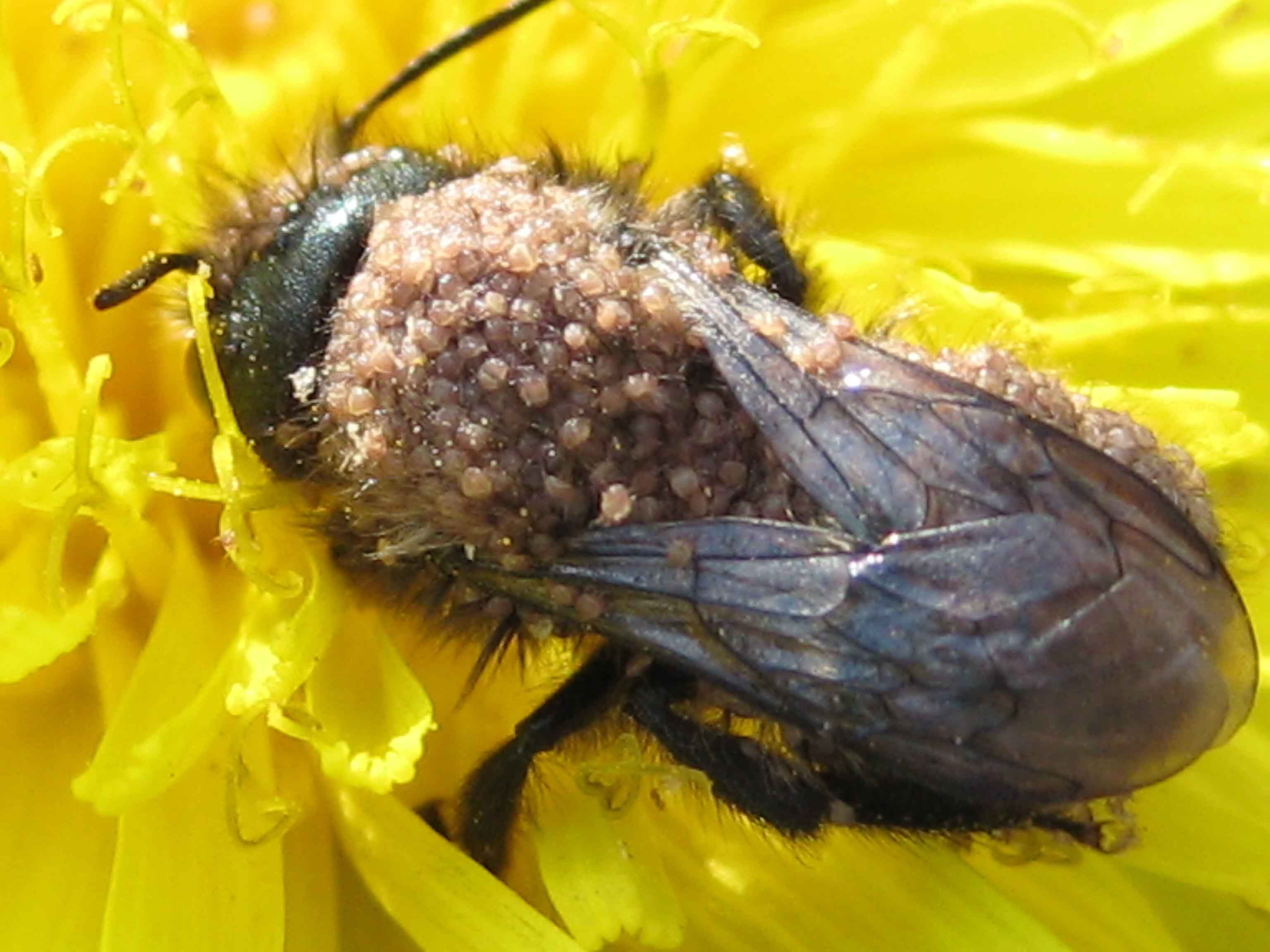
- Chaetodactylus on Osmia lignaria

Scientific classification
- Kingdom: Animalia
- Phylum: Arthropoda
- Subphylum: Chelicerata
- Class: Arachnida
- Order: Oribatida
- Superfamily: Hemisarcoptoidea
- Family: Chaetodactylidae

= Chaetodactylidae =

Family of mites

Chaetodactylidae is a family of mites in the order Sarcoptiformes. There are five genera: Sennertia, Chaetodactylus, Achaetodactylus, Centriacarus, and Roubikia.

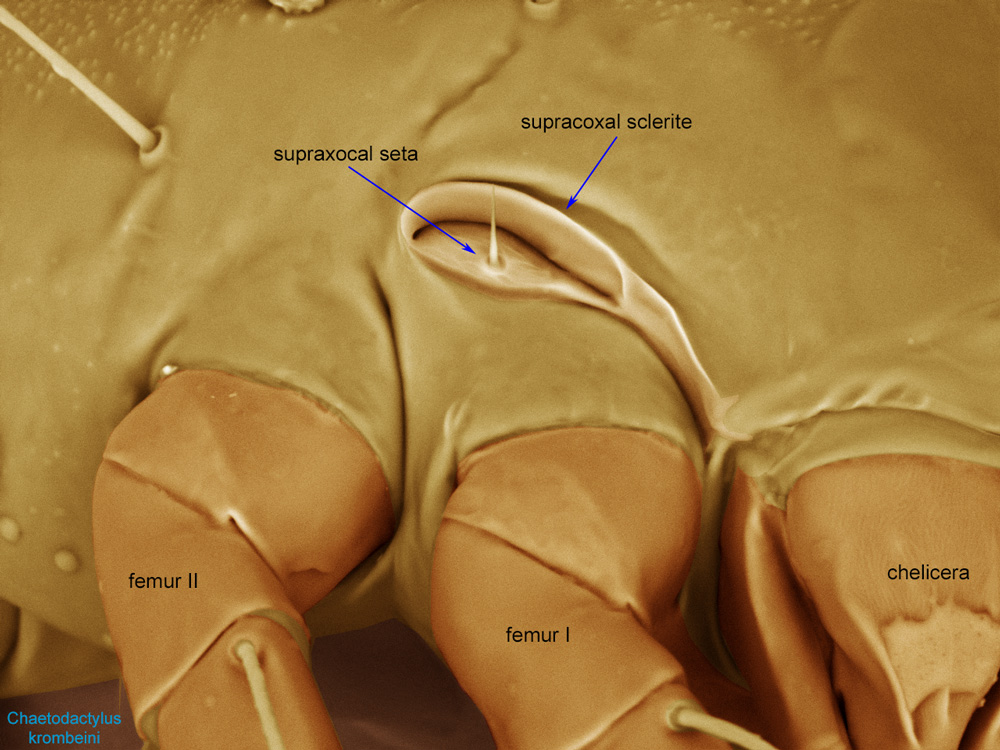
Chaetodactylus krombeini female lateral propodosoma showing enlarged supracoxal sclerite. This trait is diagnostic for the family Chaetodactylidae.
