= Podapolipidae =

Scientific classification
- Kingdom: Animalia
- Phylum: Arthropoda
- Subphylum: Chelicerata
- Class: Arachnida
- Order: Trombidiformes
- Infraorder: Eleutherengona
- Superfamily: Tarsonemoidea
- Family: Podapolipidae

Family of mites

Podapolipidae is a family of mites. All members of the family Podapolipidae are specialized obligate external (and rarely internal) parasites of various insects, among which at least 20 genera are subelytral ectoparasites of different beetle families, mainly Carabidae, Chrysomelidae, Coccinellidae, and Scarabaeidae.

These mites are sexually transmitted, i.e. the motile stages of the mite (larvae or adult females) move from one host individual to another during copulation. Parasitisation with these mites can negatively affect host fitness. For example, in some ladybirds, individuals parasitised with Coccipolipus suffer lower fecundity and egg viability and sometimes reduced longevity. Beyond this, these mites can modify host sexual and behavioural traits to boost their transmission success among individual hosts. For example, in the milk weed leaf beetle, males parasitized by Chrysomelobia tend to more frequently contact other males, and are more successful in mating competition compared to unparasitised males; and this facilitates the mite's higher transmission rate.

Four genera of Podapolipidae are exclusively associated with carabid beetles: Dorsipes (22 species), Eutarsopolipus (99 species), Ovacarus (3 species) and Regenpolipus (5 species). Apart from Ovacarus, which is an endoparasite of the reproductive tracts of some carabids, the rest are subelytral ectoparasites. Species of Eutarsopolipus are versatile in morphology and are currently grouped into ten species groups. Most of the species are specific to a single host species. However, a few parasitize more than one host species or more rarely more than one genus, yet the possibility of them being cryptic species remains untested. More interestingly, in some cases more than one species can parasitize one host species and sometimes they are specialized to different microhabitats such as the elytral cavity, on hindwings or on the dorsal abdomen of their host.
