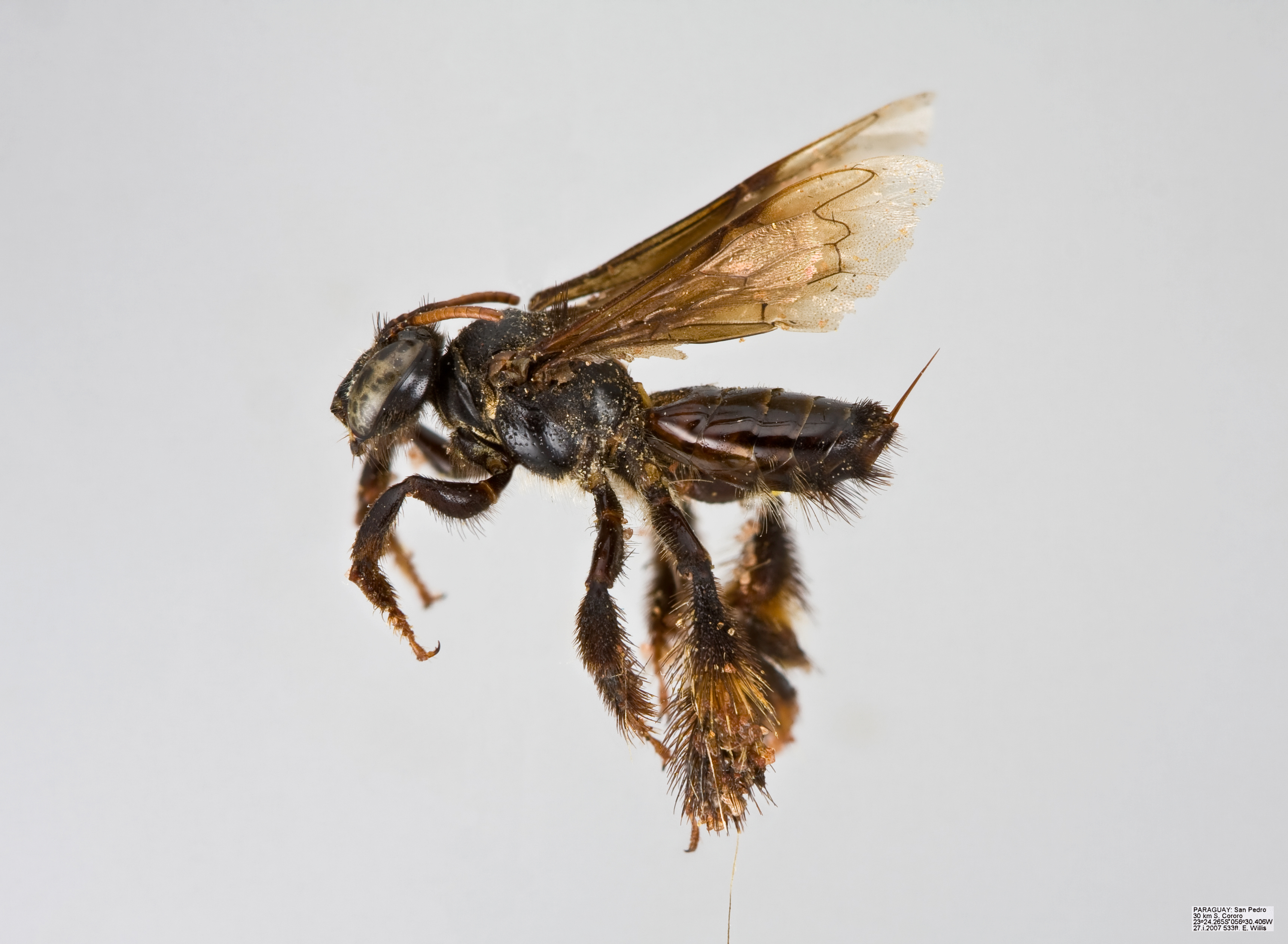
- Tetrapedia sp. (female)

Scientific classification
- Kingdom: Animalia
- Phylum: Arthropoda
- Clade: Pancrustacea
- Class: Insecta
- Order: Hymenoptera
- Family: Apidae
- Subfamily: Apinae
- Tribe: Tetrapediini; Michener & Moure, 1957

= Tetrapediini =

Tribe of bees

The Tetrapediini are a tribe of apid bees.

== Genera ==
- Coelioxoides
- Tetrapedia
