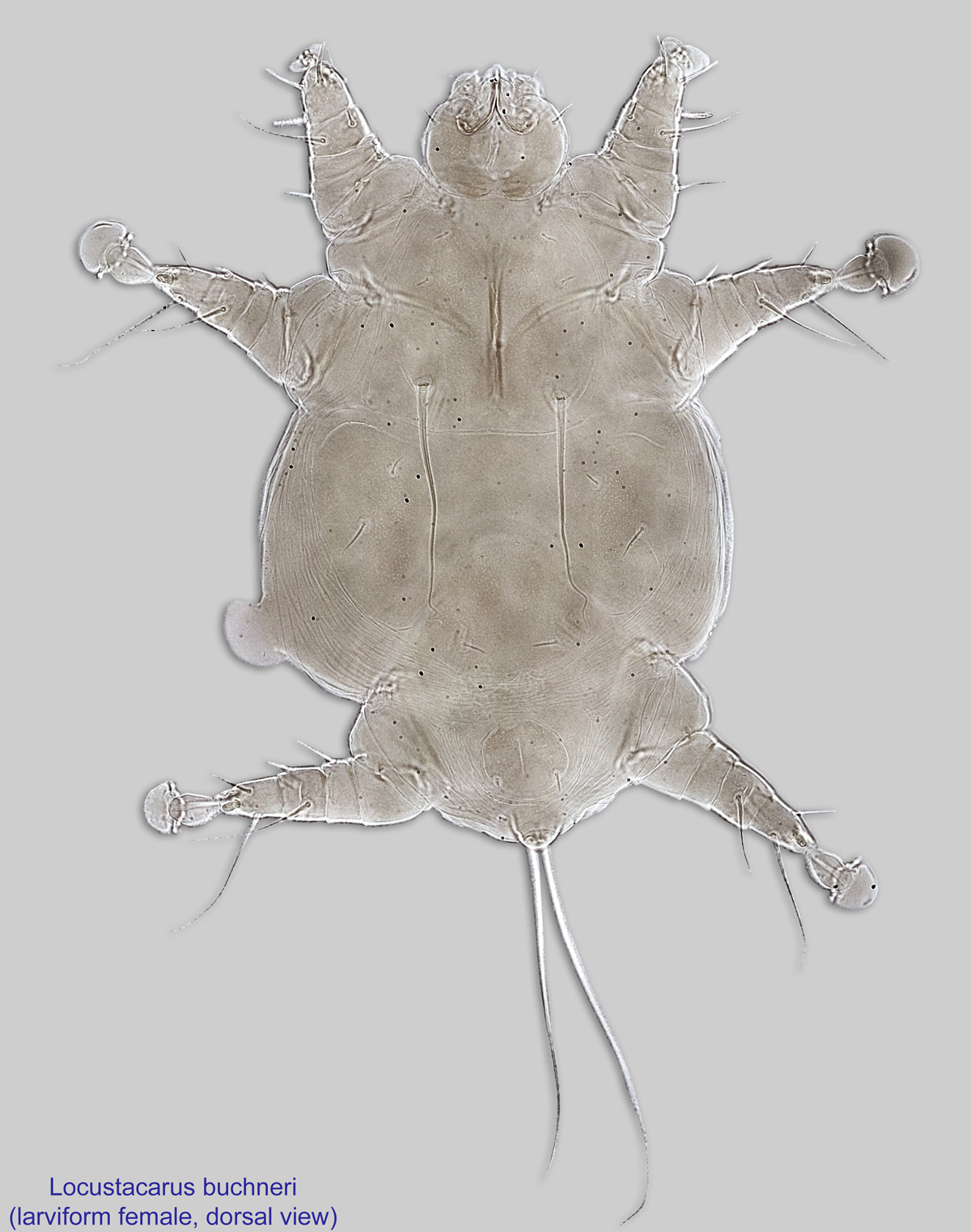
- Larviform female, dorsal view

Scientific classification
- Kingdom: Animalia
- Phylum: Arthropoda
- Subphylum: Chelicerata
- Class: Arachnida
- Order: Trombidiformes
- Family: Podapolipidae
- Genus: Locustacarus
- Species: L. buchneri

Binomial name
- Locustacarus buchneri (Stammer, 1951)

Synonyms
- Bombacarus buchneri Stammer, 1951

= Locustacarus buchneri =

Species of mite

Locustacarus buchneri is a parasitic mite that lives in the respiratory air sacs of bumblebees. They are relatively host-specific and are found primarily in the subgenus Bombus sensu stricto. Bees infested with the mite have a reduced lifespan in laboratory conditions, and although in one study they foraged at a rate similar to uninfected bees, infected bees showed a greater preference for a single flower type. Prevalence varies, but infection appears to be more common among commercial colonies than wild populations. Among colonies commercially imported from the Netherlands and Belgium to Japan, infestation rates were 20%. In South America, prevalence is very low in native populations. In Canada, there was evidence that commercial bumblebee populations were spreading L. buchneri to wild populations.
