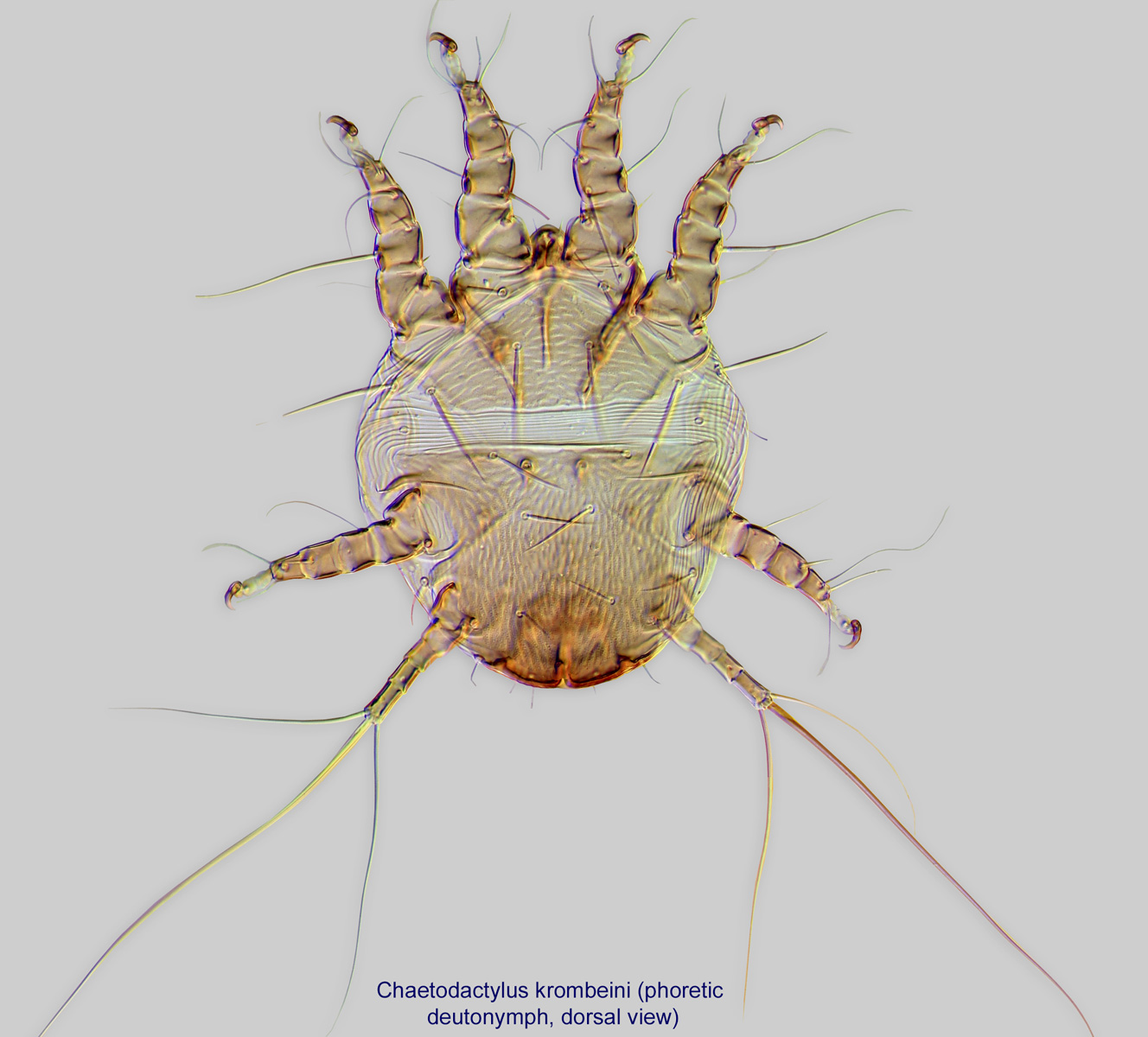
- Phoretic deuteronymph

Scientific classification
- Kingdom: Animalia
- Phylum: Arthropoda
- Subphylum: Chelicerata
- Class: Arachnida
- Superorder: Acariformes
- Order: Oribatida
- Superfamily: Hemisarcoptoidea
- Family: Chaetodactylidae
- Genus: Chaetodactylus
- Species: C. krombeini

Binomial name
- Chaetodactylus krombeini Baker, 1962

= Chaetodactylus krombeini =

Species of mite

Chaetodactylus krombeini (Krombein's hairy-footed pollen mite) was described by Karl Krombein and E. W. Baker in 1962. The mites are about 0.5 mm across, with the females larger than the males. Pollen mites are a kleptoparasitic pest of megachilid solitary bees, with Ch. krombeini found with Osmia lignaria of North America, (the orchard mason bee). Pollen mites do not feed on bees, but rather their provisions, and are harmful because they consume the food resources and starve or stunt the developing larvae; there is evidence that pollen mites also directly harm the egg by puncturing it.

The common name is somewhat misleading, as pollen mites consume more nectar than pollen. Both their feeding habits and their size differs significantly from Varroa destructor, the mite very harmful to the European honey bee. Although both are classified as mites, varroa mites are more closely related to ticks and only distantly related to Chaetodactylus.

A mason bee, upon emerging from its nest, may be burdened by hundreds of hitchhiking pollen mites. While mites do shed off bees after leaving the nest, including during mating, studies find that mites are rarely picked up when visiting flowers. The mite's life cycle is necessarily tied to the bee's reproductive cycle, but the mechanisms are not fully understood. They have both mobile and immobile phases that are reproductive and non-reproductive, at times simultaneously. Ch. krombeini appears to be more successful in humid conditions, possibly because the food mass stays moist longer under these conditions; heat and dehydration is sometimes used for pollen mite pest management.

== Identification ==
Because accurate identification of different pollen mite species is exacting and microscopic, and several host bees are in commerce and shipped regularly, it is likely that Ch. Krombeini is over-identified. Even experts express reluctance in specifying mites, such as reported in a study of Osmia pumila. In Japan, Chaetodactylus nipponicus is linked to the hornfaced bee, Osmia cornifrons, and in Europe, Chaetodactylus osmiae is associated with the red mason bee, Osmia rufa. But, Ch. osmiae has been recorded in eastern Oregon, where O. rufa is not known.

== Gallery ==
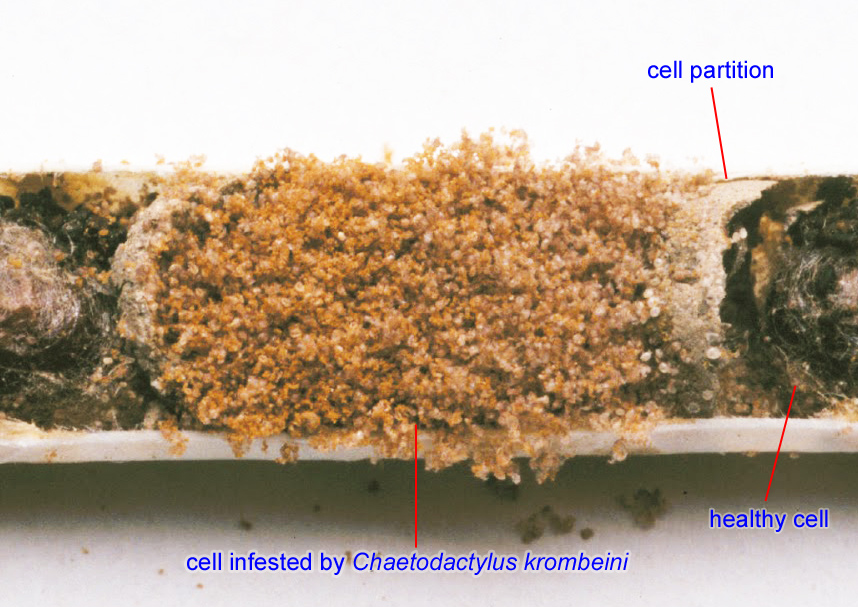
Chaetodactylus krombeini infestation of an Osmia lignaria nest cell.

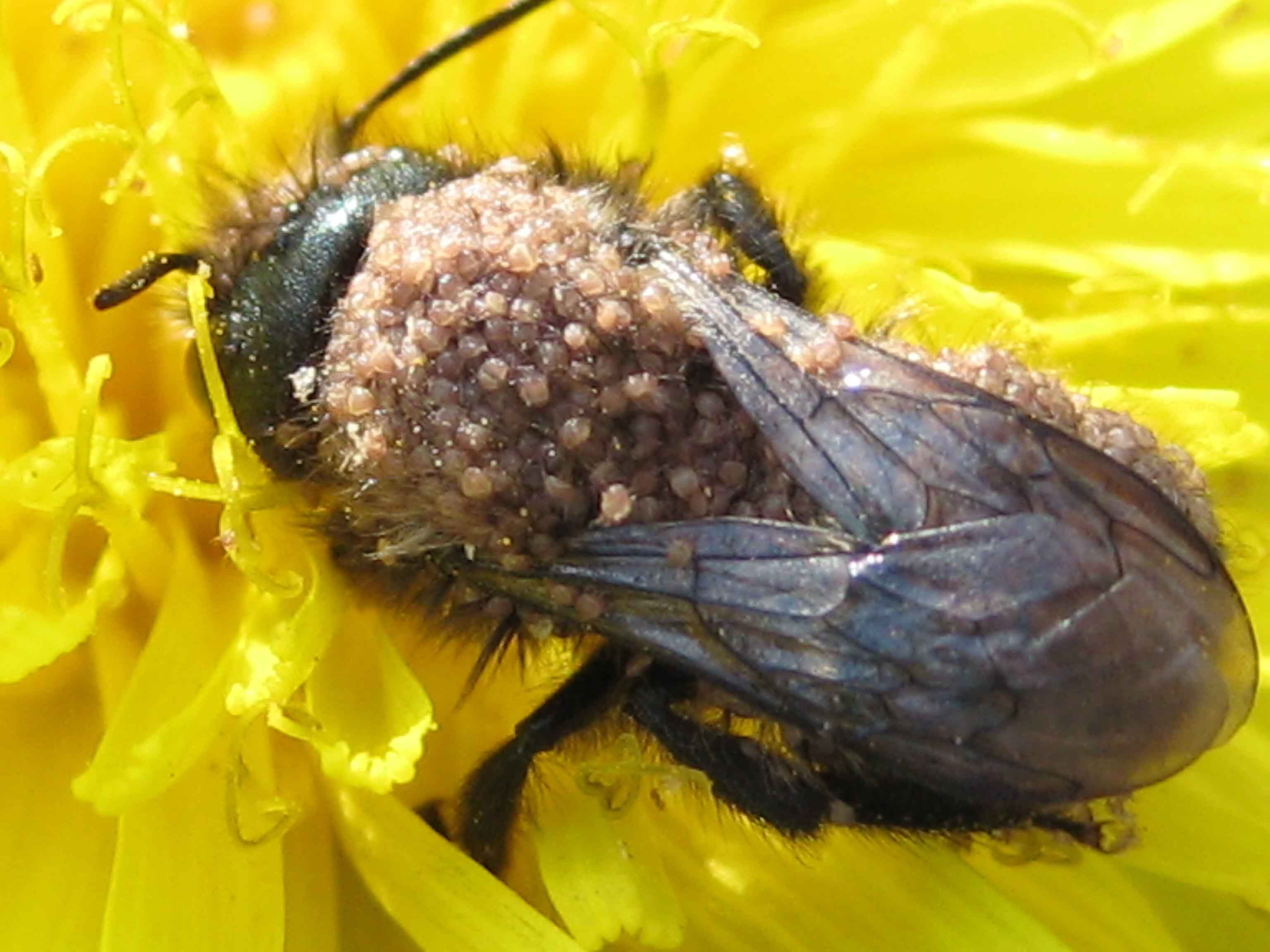
Mason bee covered in Chaetodactylus krombeini mites

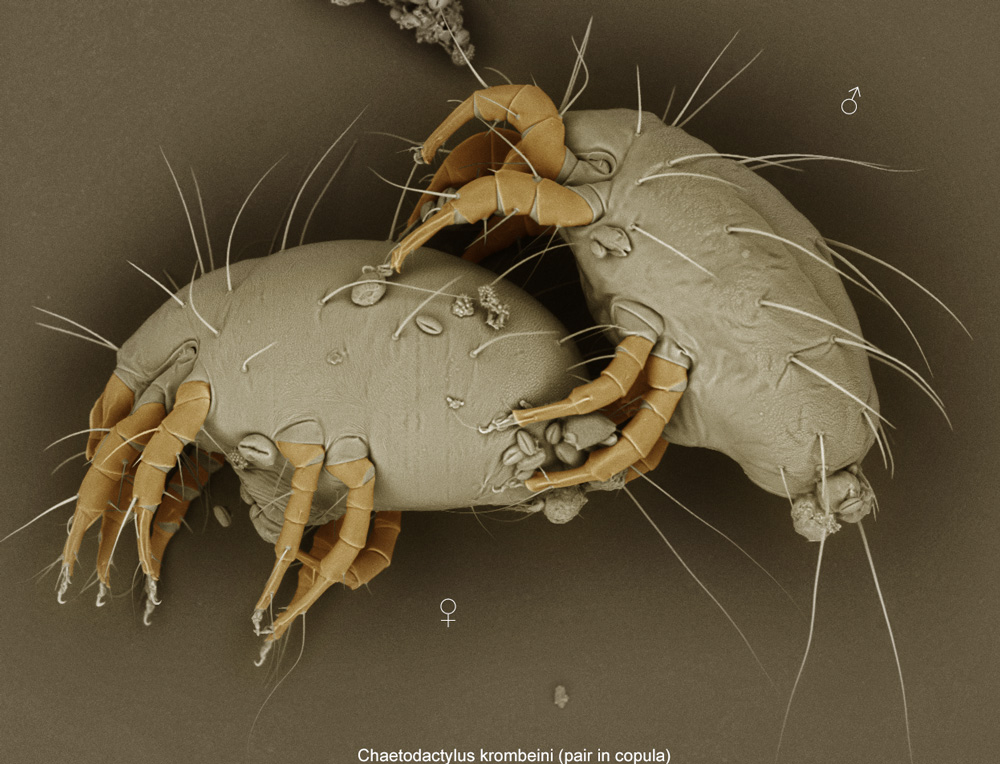
Chaetodactylus krombeini mites copulating

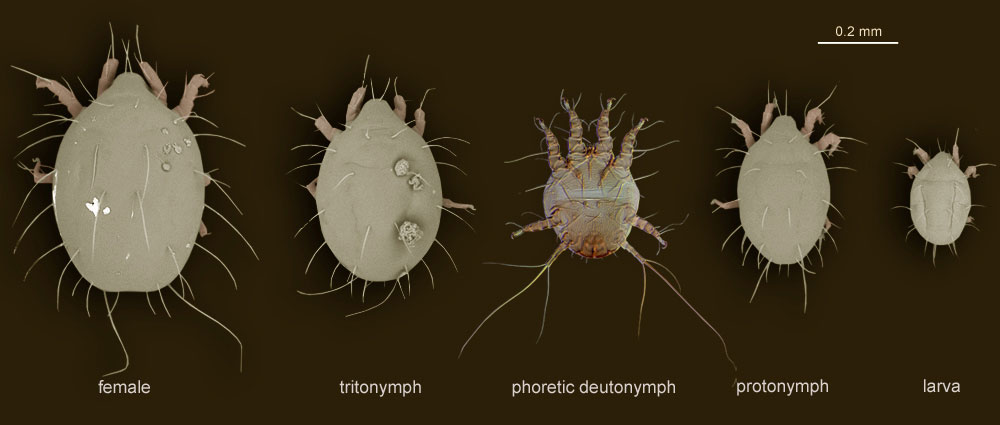
Life stages of Chaetodactylus krombeini; non-phoretic deutonymph and male not shown.

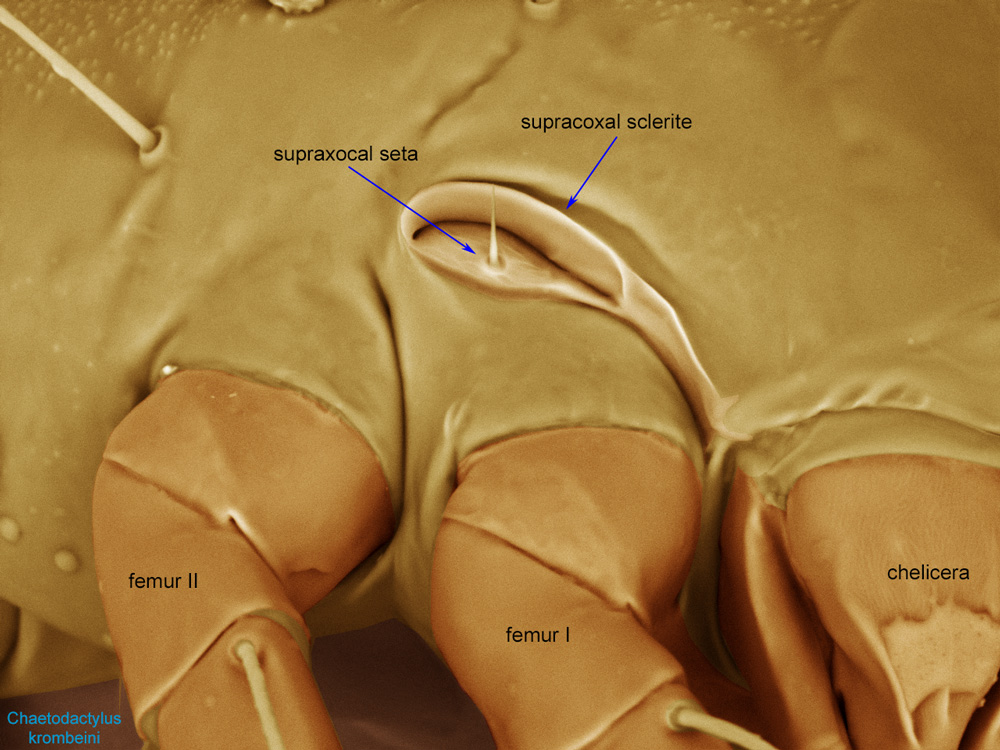
Chaetodactylus krombeini female lateral propodosoma showing enlarged supracoxal sclerite. This trait is diagnostic for the family Chaetodactylidae.

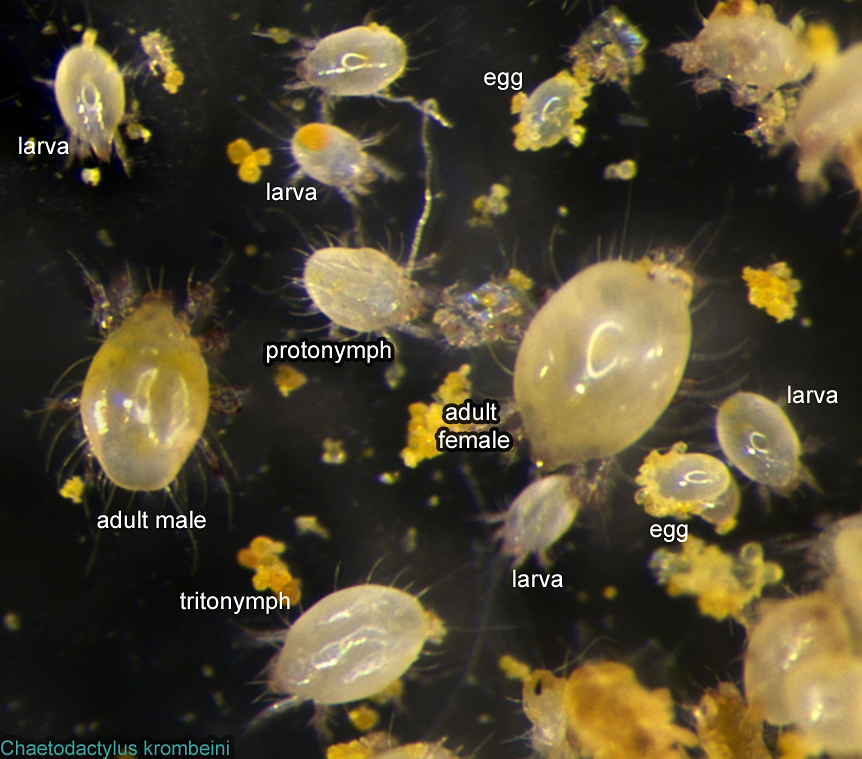
Cultured life stages (feeding stages only) of Chaetodactylus krombeini (Astigmata). Pollen grains visible.
