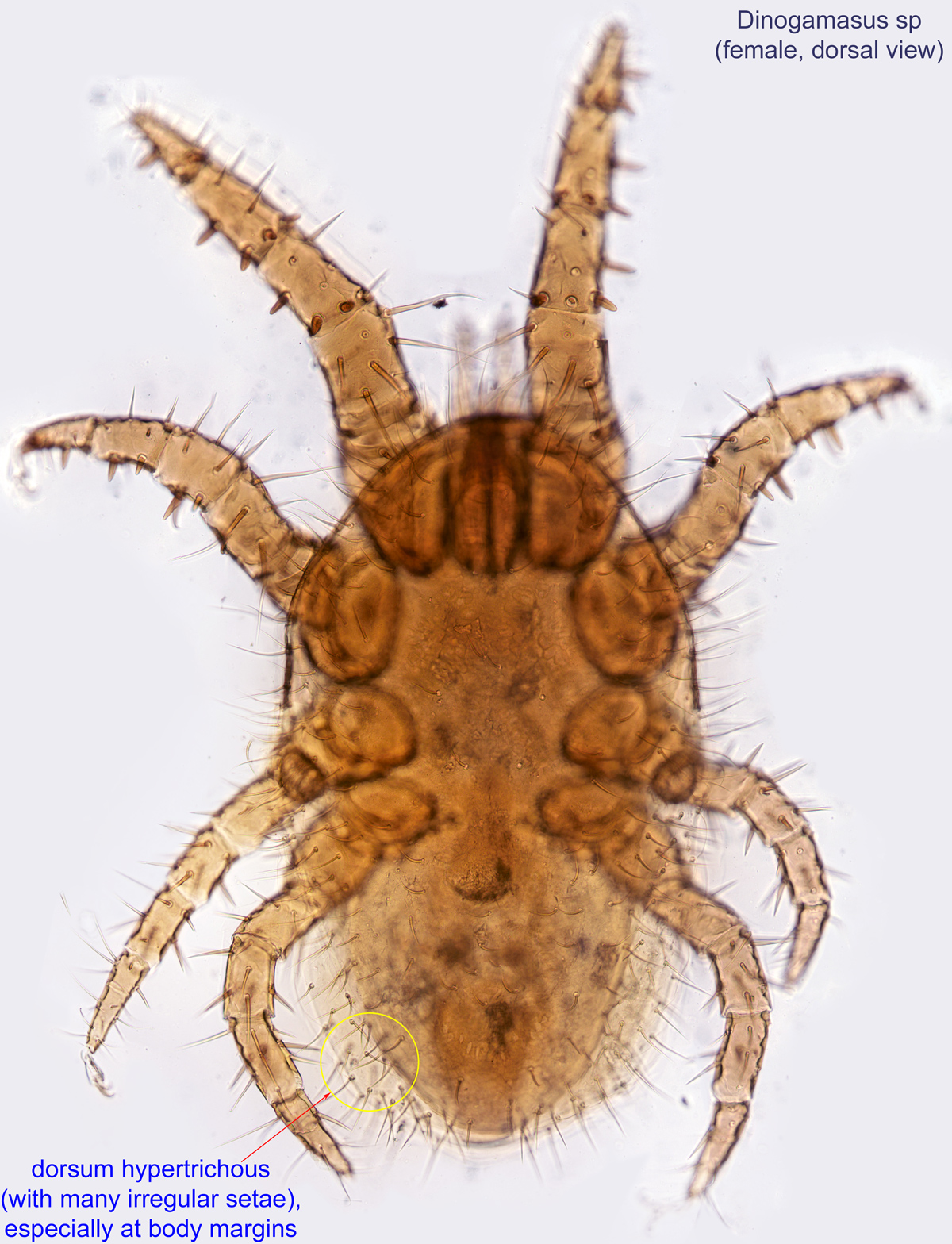

Scientific classification
- Kingdom: Animalia
- Phylum: Arthropoda
- Subphylum: Chelicerata
- Class: Arachnida
- Order: Mesostigmata
- Family: Laelapidae
- Genus: Dinogamasus; Kramer, 1898

= Dinogamasus =

Genus of mites

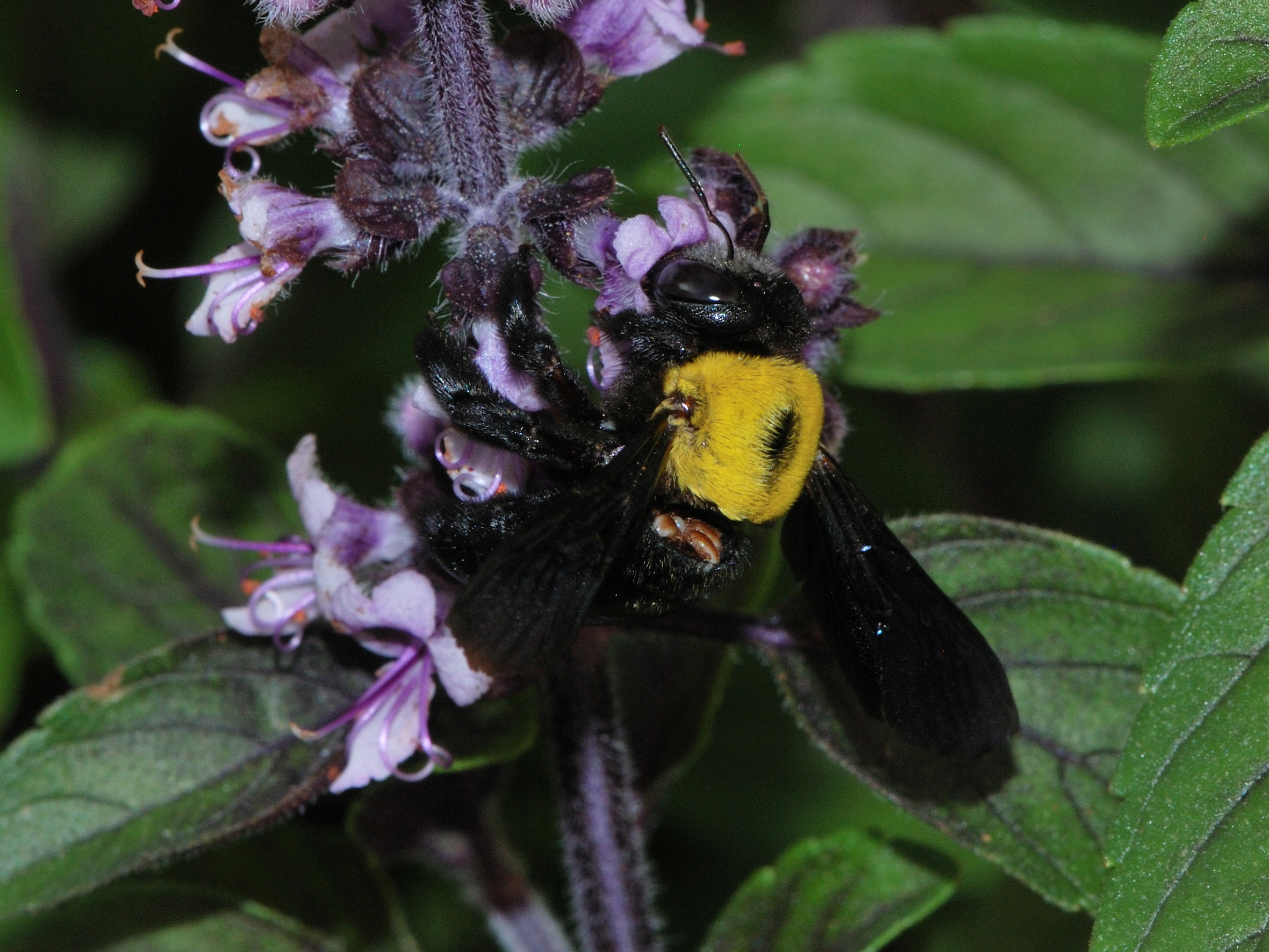
Female Xylocopa pubescens. Symbiotic mites (Dinogamasus sp.) can be seen in the bee's acarinarium.

Dinogamasus is a genus of mites in the family Laelapidae. Most species are associated with carpenter bees in the genus Xylocopa and are found in their acarinarium.

== Species ==
- Dinogamasus acutus LeVeque, 1930
- Dinogamasus affinis (Berlese, 1918)
- Dinogamasus albulus Lundqvist, 1998
- Dinogamasus alfkeni (Oudemans, 1902)
- Dinogamasus amaniensis (Vitzthum, 1919)
- Dinogamasus assimiensis Lundqvist, 1998
- Dinogamasus bakeri LeVeque, 1931
- Dinogamasus bequaerti LeVeque, 1930
- Dinogamasus braunsi (Vitzthum, 1914)
- Dinogamasus brevihirtus LeVeque, 1930
- Dinogamasus brevipes LeVeque, 1931
- Dinogamasus collarti (Oudemans, 1929)
- Dinogamasus concinnus LeVeque, 1931
- Dinogamasus crassipes Kramer, 1898
- Dinogamasus heteraspis LeVeque, 1930
- Dinogamasus inflatus LeVeque, 1930
- Dinogamasus jacobsoni (Berlese, 1910)
- Dinogamasus kerrianus LeVeque, 1931
- Dinogamasus kordofaniensis Lundqvist, 1998
- Dinogamasus levequae Lundqvist, 1998
- Dinogamasus macgregori LeVeque, 1931
- Dinogamasus maxima (Vitzthum, 1919)
- Dinogamasus medini Cunliffe, 1959
- Dinogamasus minor Lundqvist, 1998
- Dinogamasus northolmensis Loots, 1980
- Dinogamasus occidentalis Lundqvist, 1998
- Dinogamasus octoconus LeVeque, 1931
- Dinogamasus oudemansi LeVeque, 1930
- Dinogamasus parvus LeVeque, 1930
- Dinogamasus perkinsi (Oudemans, 1901)
- Dinogamasus philippinensis LeVeque, 1930
- Dinogamasus piperi LeVeque, 1930
- Dinogamasus productus LeVeque, 1930
- Dinogamasus ramaleyi LeVeque, 1931
- Dinogamasus schoutedeni (Oudemans, 1929)
- Dinogamasus similis LeVeque, 1931
- Dinogamasus sjoestedti (Trägårdh, 1904)
- Dinogamasus sternisetosa (Vitzthum, 1930)
- Dinogamasus tonkinensis Lundqvist, 1998
- Dinogamasus tortivus Lundqvist, 1998
- Dinogamasus trihirtus LeVeque, 1931
- Dinogamasus villosior (Berlese, 1918)
- Dinogamasus vitzthumi (Oudemans, 1926)
