= Acarinarium =

Specialized anatomical structure which is evolved to facilitate the retention of mites

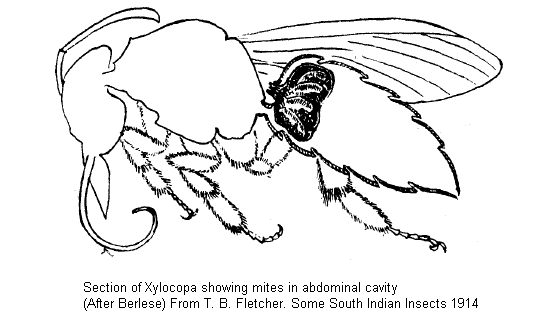
Acarinarium in Xylocopa

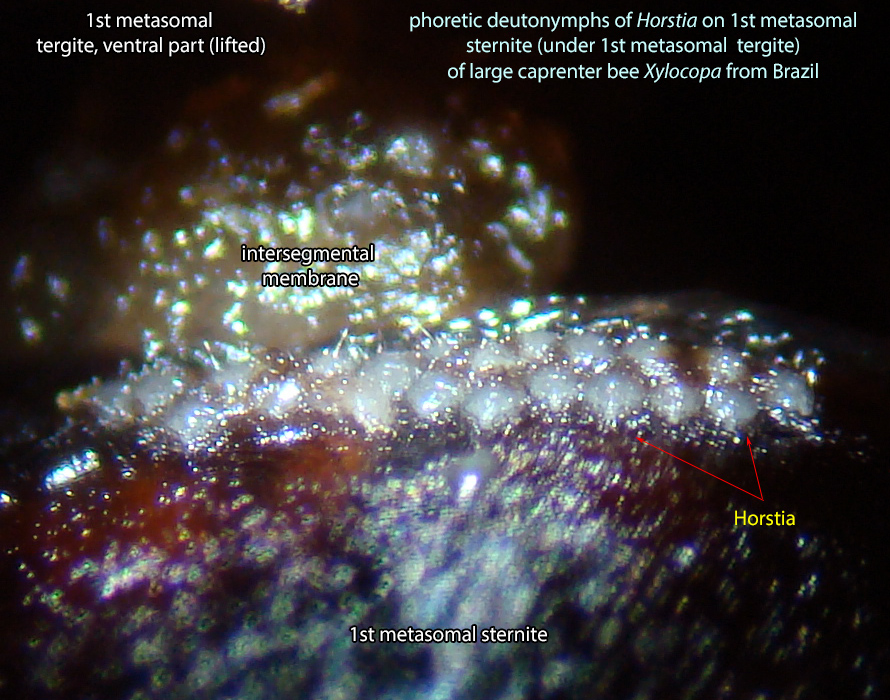
Acaridae Horstia under the first metasomal tergite in Xylocopa spp

An acarinarium is a specialized anatomical structure which is evolved to facilitate the retention of mites on the body of an organism, typically a bee or a wasp. The term was introduced by Walter Karl Johann Roepke.

== Evolution ==
The acarinarium has evolved to enhance the mutualistic relationship between the mites and the host organism. There are numerous cases where mites are phoretic on organisms that benefit from the mites' presence; cases where the host's body has changed over evolutionary time to accommodate the mites are far less common. The best-known examples are among the Apocritan Hymenoptera, in which the hosts are typically nest-making species, and it appears that the mites feed on fungi in the host nests (thus keeping away the fungi from host's offspring or their provisions), or possibly other parasites or mites whose presence in the nest is detrimental to the hosts. It is especially telling that nearly all the examples involve only the females of the host species, as it is the females that build and provision the nests. Fossil evidence of halictid bees with an acarinarium is found in the early Miocene extinct genus Oligochlora from Dominican amber deposits on Hispaniola.

The presence or absence of this structure has been used as a taxonomic character.

== Variations ==
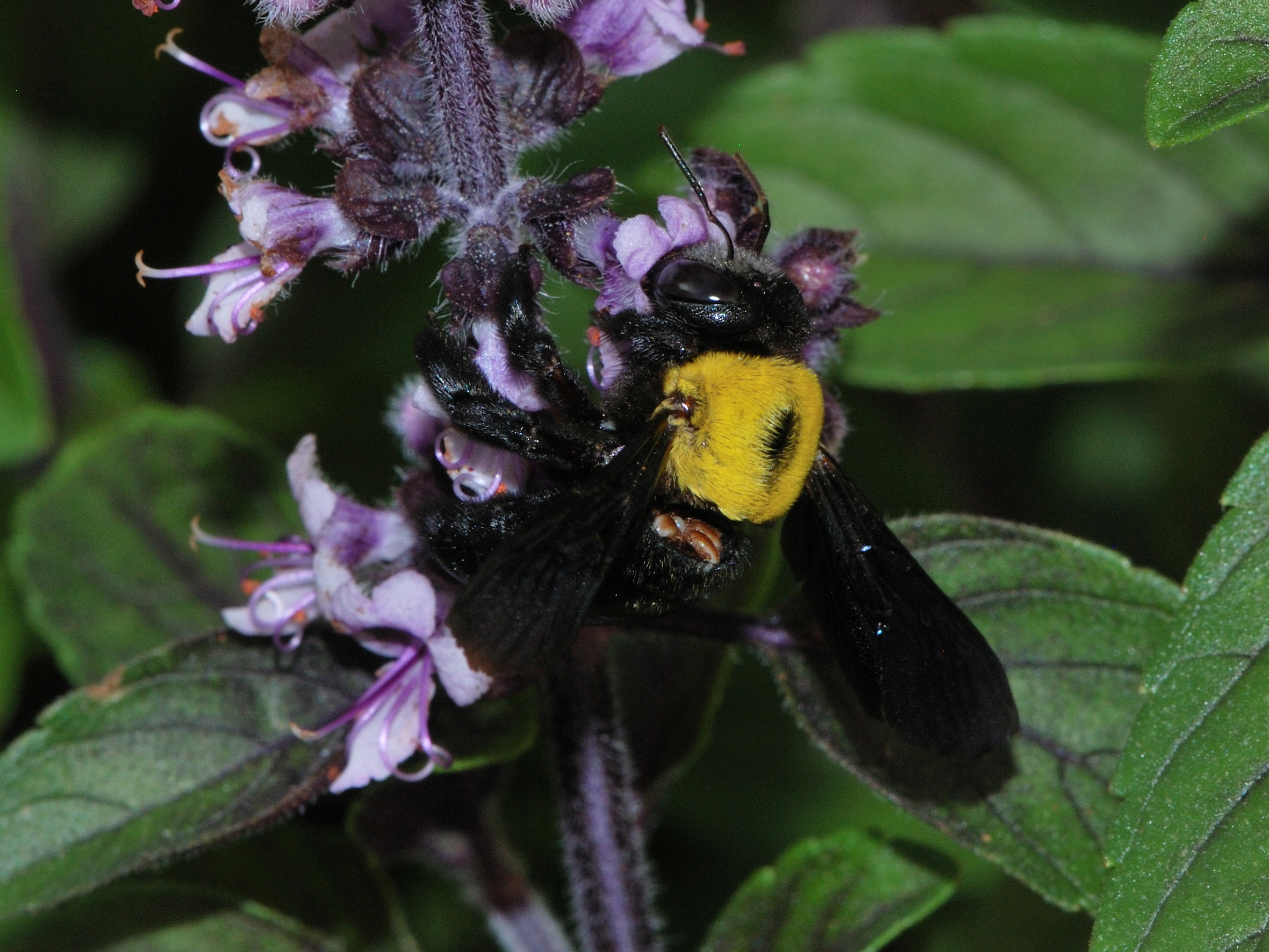
Xylocopa (Koptortosoma) pubescens with symbiotic mites (Dinogamasus sp.)

Several examples can be found among the bees, and in most such cases, only the females possess acarinaria:

- Various forms of acarinaria have evolved within different lineages of carpenter bees, in the Old World subgenera Koptortosoma and Mesotrichia - in some cases, the entire anterior portion of the metasoma is hollowed out into an enormous internal chamber, entered through a small opening on the face of the first metasomal tergite, in which the mites can travel. Some species in these groups also have supplementary acarinaria on the mesosoma in addition to the metasomal chamber.
- The augochlorine halictid genus Thectochlora is characterized by a dense brush of hairs just in front of the anterior face of the first metasomal tergite (the same effective location as in carpenter bees), which sets off a "pouchlike" space in which the mites are carried.
- In the nominate subgenus of the halictine genus Lasioglossum, many species have the anterior face of the first metasomal tergite modified by the elimination of the central setae, forming a central glabrous area, around which there is a fringe of appressed hairs, and mites cling to this area. Species without this modification rarely if ever have mites in this region, while those with the glabrous area almost never lack mites, so despite its simple nature it does indeed appear to function as an acarinarium. In some cases, sister species may differ in this feature, one having an acarinarium, and one lacking it, suggesting that the trait can be lost and possibly regained.

Other examples include:

- In the potter wasp genus Parancistrocerus, the base of the second metasomal tergite is concave, and covered by the posterior lip of the first metasomal tergite, and mites are carried in the concavity. This structure appears the same in both males and females, though it is difficult to assess whether both sexes carry mites with equal frequency.
