= List of Ceratina species =

This is a list of species in genus Ceratina, the small carpenter bees.

== Species ==
- Ceratina acantha Provancher, 1895
- Ceratina accusator Cockerell, 1919
- Ceratina acuta Friese, 1896
- Ceratina aeneiceps Friese, 1917
- Ceratina aenescens Friese, 1917
- Ceratina aereola Vachal, 1903
- Ceratina aetana Shiokawa, 2006
- Ceratina ahngeri Kokujev, 1905
- Ceratina albopicta Cockerell, 1937
- Ceratina albosticta Cockerell, 1931
- Ceratina alexandrae Baker, 2002
- Ceratina aliceae Cockerell, 1937
- Ceratina allodapoides Strand, 1912
- Ceratina aloes Cockerell, 1932
- Ceratina angulata Roig-Alsina, 2013
- Ceratina apacheorum Daly, 1973
- Ceratina apatela Engel, 2018
- Ceratina arabiae (Daly, 1983)
- Ceratina arizonensis Cockerell, 1898
- Ceratina armata Smith, 1854
- Ceratina aspera Schrottky, 1902
- Ceratina asunciana Strand, 1910
- Ceratina asuncionis Strand, 1910
- Ceratina atopura Cockerell, 1937
- Ceratina atra Friese, 1917
- Ceratina atrata H. S. Smith, 1907
- Ceratina augochloroides Ducke, 1911
- Ceratina auriviridis H. S. Smith, 1907
- Ceratina australensis (Perkins, 1912)
- Ceratina azteca Cresson, 1878
- Ceratina azurea Benoist, 1955
- Ceratina ballotae Eardley & Daly, 2007
- Ceratina barbarae Eardley & Daly, 2007
- Ceratina basaltica Flórez-Gómez et al., 2022
- Ceratina beata Cameron, 1897
- Ceratina belizensis Baker, 1907
- Ceratina belliata Shiokawa, 2008
- Ceratina benguetensis Cockerell, 1916
- Ceratina bhawani Bingham, 1908
- Ceratina bicolorata Smith, 1879
- Ceratina bicuneata Cockerell, 1918
- Ceratina bifida Friese, 1900
- Ceratina biguttulata (Moure, 1941)
- Ceratina bilobata Cockerell, 1937
- Ceratina binghami Cockerell, 1908
- Ceratina bispinosa Handlirsch, 1889
- Ceratina boninensis Yasumatsu, 1955
- Ceratina braunsi Eardley & Daly, 2007
- Ceratina braunsiana Friese, 1905
- Ceratina breviceps Michener, 1954
- Ceratina bryanti Cockerell, 1919
- Ceratina buscki Cockerell, 1919
- Ceratina calcarata Robertson, 1900
- Ceratina callosa (Fabricius, 1794)
- Ceratina canaliculata Roig-Alsina, 2016
- Ceratina canarensis Cockerell, 1919
- Ceratina capitosa Smith, 1879
- Ceratina carinifrons Baker, 2002
- Ceratina catamarcensis Schrottky, 1907
- Ceratina caveata Roig-Alsina, 2013
- Ceratina cavifrons Shiokawa, 2006
- Ceratina chalcea Spinola, 1841
- Ceratina chalcites Germar, 1839
- Ceratina chalybea Chevrier, 1872
- Ceratina chiangmaiensis Warrit et al., 2012
- Ceratina chinensis (Wu, 1963)
- Ceratina chloris (Fabricius, 1804)
- Ceratina christellae Terzo, 1998
- Ceratina chrysocephala Cockerell, 1912
- Ceratina chrysomalla Gerstäcker, 1869
- Ceratina citrinifrons Cockerell, 1937
- Ceratina citriphila Cockerell, 1935
- Ceratina cladura Cockerell, 1919
- Ceratina claripennis Friese, 1917
- Ceratina cobaltina Cresson, 1878
- Ceratina cockerelli H. S. Smith, 1907
- Ceratina cognata Smith, 1879
- Ceratina collusor Cockerell, 1919
- Ceratina combinata Friese, 1910
- Ceratina compacta Smith, 1879
- Ceratina congoensis Meunier, 1890
- Ceratina coptica Baker, 2002
- Ceratina corinna Nurse, 1904
- Ceratina correntina Schrottky, 1907
- Ceratina cosmiocephala Cameron, 1908
- Ceratina crassiceps Friese, 1925
- Ceratina crewi Cockerell, 1903
- Ceratina cucurbitina (Rossi, 1792)
- Ceratina cupreiventris Smith, 1879
- Ceratina cuprifrons Strand, 1910
- Ceratina currani Schwarz, 1934
- Ceratina cyanea (Kirby, 1802)
- Ceratina cyanicollis Schrottky, 1902
- Ceratina cyaniventris Cresson, 1865
- Ceratina cyanura Cockerell, 1918
- Ceratina cypriaca Mavromoustakis, 1954
- Ceratina dallatorreana Friese, 1896
- Ceratina dalyi Terzo, 1998
- Ceratina daressalamica Strand, 1912
- Ceratina darwini Friese, 1910
- Ceratina demotica Baker, 2002
- Ceratina denesi Terzo, 1998
- Ceratina dentipes Friese, 1914
- Ceratina dentiventris Gerstäcker, 1869
- Ceratina diligens Smith, 1879
- Ceratina diloloensis Cockerell, 1932
- Ceratina dimidiata Friese, 1910
- Ceratina diodonta H. S. Smith, 1907
- Ceratina duckei Friese, 1910
- Ceratina dupla Say, 1837
- Ceratina egeria Nurse, 1904
- Ceratina electron Cockerell, 1937
- Ceratina elisabethae Cockerell, 1937
- Ceratina emeiensis Wu, 2000
- Ceratina ericia Vachal, 1903
- Ceratina esakii Yasumatsu & Hirashima, 1969
- Ceratina excavata Cockerell, 1937
- Ceratina eximia Smith, 1862
- Ceratina fastigiata Fox, 1896
- Ceratina ferghanica Morawitz, 1875
- Ceratina fimbriata Roig-Alsina, 2013
- Ceratina fioreseana Oliveira, 2020
- Ceratina flavipes Smith, 1879
- Ceratina flavolateralis Cockerell, 1916
- Ceratina flavopicta Smith, 1858
- Ceratina floridana Mitchell, 1962
- Ceratina foveifera Strand, 1912
- Ceratina fuliginosa Cockerell, 1916
- Ceratina fulvitarsis Friese, 1925
- Ceratina fulvofasciata Ducke, 1908
- Ceratina fumipennis Friese, 1917
- Ceratina glossata Michener, 1954
- Ceratina gnoma Eardley & Daly, 2007
- Ceratina gomphrenae Schrottky, 1909
- Ceratina gossypii Schrottky, 1907
- Ceratina grandis Shiokawa, 2015
- Ceratina gravidula Gerstäcker, 1869
- Ceratina guarnacciana Genaro, 1998
- Ceratina guineae Strand, 1912
- Ceratina gurkhana Shiokawa, 2008
- Ceratina hakkarica Kocourek, 1998
- Ceratina haladai Terzo & Rasmont, 2004
- Ceratina hexae Eardley & Daly, 2007
- Ceratina hieratica Baker, 2002
- Ceratina hieroglyphica Smith, 1854
- Ceratina himalayana Shiokawa, 2008
- Ceratina huberi Friese, 1910
- Ceratina humilior Cockerell, 1916
- Ceratina hurdi Daly, 1973
- Ceratina ignara Cresson, 1878
- Ceratina immaculata Friese, 1910
- Ceratina incertula Cockerell, 1937
- Ceratina incognita Bingham, 1898
- Ceratina indica (Hirashima, 1969)
- Ceratina indigovirens Flórez-Gómez et al., 2022
- Ceratina inermis Friese, 1905
- Ceratina interrupta Alfken, 1926
- Ceratina itzarum Cockerell, 1931
- Ceratina iwatai Yasumatsu, 1936
- Ceratina jacobsoni van der Vecht, 1952
- Ceratina japonica Cockerell, 1911
- Ceratina jejuensis S. Lee, 2005
- Ceratina kankauensis Strand, 1913
- Ceratina kopili Flórez-Gómez et al., 2022
- Ceratina kosemponis Strand, 1913
- Ceratina kraussi Michener, 1954
- Ceratina labrosa Friese, 1905
- Ceratina laevifrons Morawitz, 1895
- Ceratina laeviuscula Wu, 1963
- Ceratina langenburgiae Strand, 1912
- Ceratina langi Cockerell, 1934
- Ceratina latisetis Roig-Alsina, 2013
- Ceratina lativentris Friese, 1905
- Ceratina lehmanni Friese, 1910
- Ceratina lepida Smith, 1879
- Ceratina liberica Cockerell, 1937
- Ceratina lieftincki van der Vecht, 1952
- Ceratina liliputana Cockerell, 1932
- Ceratina lineola Vachal, 1903
- Ceratina litoraria van der Vecht, 1952
- Ceratina loa Strand, 1912
- Ceratina loewi Gerstäcker, 1869
- Ceratina longiceps Smith, 1879
- Ceratina loquata Nurse, 1902
- Ceratina lucidula Smith, 1854
- Ceratina lucifera Cockerell, 1934
- Ceratina ludwigsi Strand, 1914
- Ceratina lunata Friese, 1905
- Ceratina maai Shiokawa & Hirashima, 1982
- Ceratina macondiana Flórez-Gómez & Griswold, 2020
- Ceratina maculifrons Smith, 1854
- Ceratina madecassa Friese, 1900
- Ceratina maghrebensis Daly, 1983
- Ceratina malindiae (Daly, 1988)
- Ceratina mandibularis Friese, 1896
- Ceratina manni Cockerell, 1912
- Ceratina marginata Baker, 1907
- Ceratina mariannensis Yasumatsu, 1939
- Ceratina mauritanica Lepeletier, 1841
- Ceratina megastigmata Yasumatsu & Hirashima, 1969
- Ceratina melanochroa (Moure, 1941)
- Ceratina melanoptera Cockerell, 1924
- Ceratina mendozina Roig-Alsina, 2016
- Ceratina metaria Cockerell, 1920
- Ceratina mexicana Cresson, 1878
- Ceratina micheneri Daly, 1973
- Ceratina mikmaqi Rehan & Sheffield, 2011
- Ceratina minima Friese, 1909
- Ceratina minuta Friese, 1905
- Ceratina mocsaryi Friese, 1896
- Ceratina moderata Cameron, 1897
- Ceratina moerenhouti Vachal, 1903
- Ceratina monstrata Sung & Shiokawa, 2012
- Ceratina montana Holmberg, 1886
- Ceratina morawitzi Sickmann, 1894
- Ceratina moricei Friese, 1899
- Ceratina morrensis Strand, 1910
- Ceratina muelleri Friese, 1910
- Ceratina muscatella Nurse, 1902
- Ceratina namibensis Eardley & Daly, 2007
- Ceratina nanula Cockerell, 1897
- Ceratina nasalis Friese, 1905
- Ceratina nasiinsignita Strand, 1912
- Ceratina nativitatis Cockerell, 1937
- Ceratina nautlana Cockerell, 1897
- Ceratina neocallosa Daly, 1983
- Ceratina neomexicana Cockerell, 1901
- Ceratina nigra Handlirsch, 1889
- Ceratina nigriceps Friese, 1905
- Ceratina nigrita Ashmead, 1900
- Ceratina nigritula Michener, 1954
- Ceratina nigroaenea Gerstäcker, 1869
- Ceratina nigrolabiata Friese, 1896
- Ceratina nigrolateralis Cockerell, 1916
- Ceratina nilotica Cockerell, 1937
- Ceratina nitidella Cockerell, 1937
- Ceratina nitidifrons Roig-Alsina, 2016
- Ceratina nyassensis Strand, 1912
- Ceratina obtusicauda Cockerell, 1919
- Ceratina okinawana Matsumura & Uchida, 1926
- Ceratina opaca Friese, 1905
- Ceratina opipara Shiokawa, 2015
- Ceratina oxalidis Schrottky, 1907
- Ceratina pacifica H. S. Smith, 1907
- Ceratina pacis Cockerell, 1937
- Ceratina palauensis Yasumatsu, 1939
- Ceratina papuana van der Vecht, 1952
- Ceratina paraguayensis Schrottky, 1907
- Ceratina parvula Smith, 1854
- Ceratina paulyi (Daly, 1988)
- Ceratina pembana Cockerell, 1935
- Ceratina penicillata Friese, 1905
- Ceratina penicilligera Strand, 1912
- Ceratina perforatrix Smith, 1879
- Ceratina perpolita Cockerell, 1937
- Ceratina personata Friese, 1905
- Ceratina picta Smith, 1854
- Ceratina pictifrons Smith, 1861
- Ceratina piracicabana Schrottky, 1911
- Ceratina placida Smith, 1862
- Ceratina polita Friese, 1902
- Ceratina politifrons Cockerell, 1937
- Ceratina politula Shiokawa, 2006
- Ceratina popovi Wu, 1963
- Ceratina propinqua Cameron, 1897
- Ceratina psaenythia Engel, 2018
- Ceratina pubescens Smith, 1879
- Ceratina pulchripes Shiokawa, 2002
- Ceratina punctaticeps Van der Vecht, 1953
- Ceratina punctigena Cockerell, 1916
- Ceratina punctiventris Friese, 1910
- Ceratina punctulata Spinola, 1841
- Ceratina pusilla Roig-Alsina, 2016
- Ceratina quadripunctata Wu, 2000
- Ceratina quinquemaculata Cockerell, 1912
- Ceratina raquelitae Flórez-Gómez & Ayala, 2022
- Ceratina rasmonti Terzo, 1998
- Ceratina rectangulifera Schwarz & Michener, 1954
- Ceratina regalis Cockerell, 1912
- Ceratina rehanae Flórez-Gómez & Ayala, 2022
- Ceratina rhodura Cockerell, 1937
- Ceratina richardsoniae Schrottky, 1909
- Ceratina ridleyi Cockerell, 1910
- Ceratina roseoviridis Cockerell, 1937
- Ceratina rossi (Daly, 1988)
- Ceratina rothschildiana Vachal, 1909
- Ceratina rotundiceps Smith, 1879
- Ceratina rufigastra Cockerell, 1937
- Ceratina rufipes Smith, 1879
- Ceratina rugifrons Smith, 1879
- Ceratina rugosissima Cockerell, 1932
- Ceratina rukaina Sung & Shiokawa, 2012
- Ceratina rupestris Holmberg, 1884
- Ceratina ruwenzorica Cockerell, 1937
- Ceratina sakagamii Terzo, 1998
- Ceratina sakagamina Shiokawa, 2015
- Ceratina samburuensis Cockerell, 1910
- Ceratina sapphira Flórez-Gómez & Ayala, 2022
- Ceratina satoi Yasumatsu, 1936
- Ceratina saundersi Daly, 1983
- Ceratina sauteri Strand, 1913
- Ceratina schwarzi Kocourek, 1998
- Ceratina schwarziana Terzo, 1998
- Ceratina sclerops Schrottky, 1907
- Ceratina sculpturata Smith, 1858
- Ceratina seikii Sung & Shiokawa, 2012
- Ceratina senegalensis Strand, 1912
- Ceratina sequoiae Michener, 1936
- Ceratina sericea Friese, 1910
- Ceratina shinnersi Daly, 1973
- Ceratina silvicola Shiokawa, 2015
- Ceratina simillima Smith, 1854
- Ceratina smaragdula (Fabricius, 1787)
- Ceratina spectata Shiokawa, 2015
- Ceratina speculifrons Cockerell, 1920
- Ceratina speculina Cockerell, 1937
- Ceratina spilota Cockerell, 1932
- Ceratina spinipes Shiokawa, 2009
- Ceratina splendida Shiokawa, 2008
- Ceratina stilbonota Moure, 1941
- Ceratina strenua Smith, 1879
- Ceratina stuckenbergi Eardley & Daly, 2007
- Ceratina subcarinata Roig-Alsina, 2013
- Ceratina subquadrata Smith, 1854
- Ceratina subscintilla Cockerell, 1937
- Ceratina sulcata Friese, 1905
- Ceratina sutepensis Cockerell, 1929
- Ceratina tabescens Cockerell, 1912
- Ceratina taborae Strand, 1912
- Ceratina takasagona Shiokawa & Hirashima, 1982
- Ceratina takeshii Shiokawa, 2008
- Ceratina tanganyicensis Strand, 1911
- Ceratina tanoi Shiokawa, 2010
- Ceratina tantilla (Moure, 1941)
- Ceratina tarsata Morawitz, 1872
- Ceratina tawangensisGhosh, Jobiraj, Subramanian, 2023
- Ceratina tejonensis Cresson, 1864
- Ceratina tenkeana Cockerell, 1937
- Ceratina tepetlana Flórez-Gómez et al., 2022
- Ceratina teunisseni Terzo & Rasmont, 1997
- Ceratina texana Daly, 1973
- Ceratina tibialis Morawitz, 1895
- Ceratina timberlakei Daly, 1973
- Ceratina titusi Cockerell, 1903
- Ceratina triangulifera Cockerell, 1914
- Ceratina tricolor Michener, 1954
- Ceratina trimaculata Friese, 1917
- Ceratina tropica Crawford, 1910
- Ceratina truncata Friese, 1905
- Ceratina tucumana Roig-Alsina, 2013
- Ceratina turgida (Moure, 1941)
- Ceratina umbricosta Roig-Alsina, 2013
- Ceratina unicolor Friese, 1911
- Ceratina unimaculata Smith, 1879
- Ceratina velthuisi Terzo & Rasmont, 2001
- Ceratina verhoeffi Terzo & Rasmont, 1997
- Ceratina vernoniae Schrottky, 1920
- Ceratina virescens Friese, 1910
- Ceratina viridicincta Cockerell, 1931
- Ceratina viridifrons Cockerell, 1934
- Ceratina viridis Guérin-Méneville, 1844
- Ceratina volitans Schrottky, 1907
- Ceratina wagneri Friese, 1910
- Ceratina waini (Shiokawa & Sakagami, 1969)
- Ceratina warnckei Terzo, 1998
- Ceratina whiteheadi Eardley & Daly, 2007
- Ceratina xanthocera (Moure, 1941)
- Ceratina xanthostoma Cockerell, 1912
- Ceratina yamanei Sung & Shiokawa, 2012
- Ceratina yasumatsui Hirashima, 1971
- Ceratina yonagunensis Shiokawa, 2011
- Ceratina yucatanica Cockerell, 1931
- Ceratina zandeni Terzo, 1998
- Ceratina zeteki Cockerell, 1934
- Ceratina zwakhalsi Terzo & Rasmont, 1997
- † Ceratina disrupta (Cockerell 1906)
