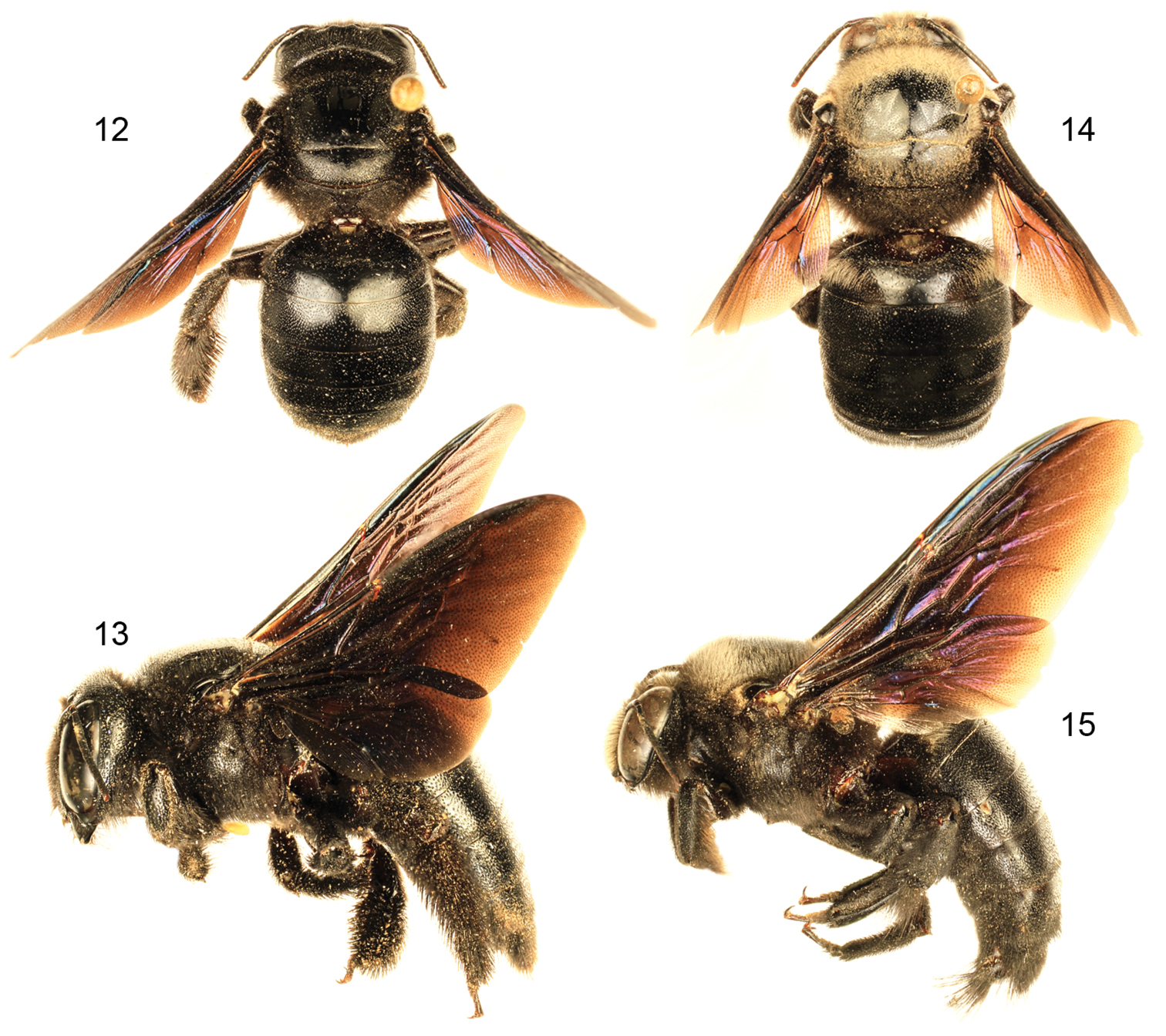
- 12 - Dorsal view, female 13 - Lateral view, female 14 - Dorsal view, male 15 - Lateral view, male

Scientific classification
- Kingdom: Animalia
- Phylum: Arthropoda
- Clade: Pancrustacea
- Class: Insecta
- Order: Hymenoptera
- Family: Apidae
- Genus: Xylocopa
- Species: X. sulcatipes

Binomial name
- Xylocopa sulcatipes Maa 1970

= Xylocopa sulcatipes =

Species of bee

Xylocopa sulcatipes is a large Arabian carpenter bee. These multivoltine bees take part in social nesting and cooperative nesting. They are metasocial carpenter bees that nest in thin dead branches. One or more cooperating females build many brood cells. They have been extensively studied in Saudi Arabia and Israel.

== Taxonomy and phylogeny ==
X. sulcatipes is part of the subfamily Xylocopinae within the hymenopteran family Apidae. Xylocopinae is divided into four tribes: Allodapini, Ceratinini, Xylocopini, and Manueliini. The genus Xylocopa, composed of large carpenter bees, consists of about 469 species in 31–51 subgenera, and the species are found throughout the world. X. sulcatipes is part of the subgenus Ctenoxylocopa.

== Description and identification ==
X. sulcatipes differs from other Arabian carpenter bees. Females are distinguishable by the presence of black pubescence (short matted hairs) on the face and the back side of the mesosoma. The mesoscutellum, or female middle body shield, does not extend over the metanotum, or middle thorax. The apical margin, the lower part of the abdomen, is rounded instead of squared off. They have a plate on their pygidium, their lowermost abdominal section.

Males' bodies are covered in a dark to black pubescence except their faces. The middle section on their back is mostly light or pale. The first metasomal tergum, or back, with subhorizontal dorsal surface rounds into the anterior surface.

X. sulcatipes eggs measure around 11 mm in length and 2.2 mm in diameter. Adults are approximately 22 mm in length.

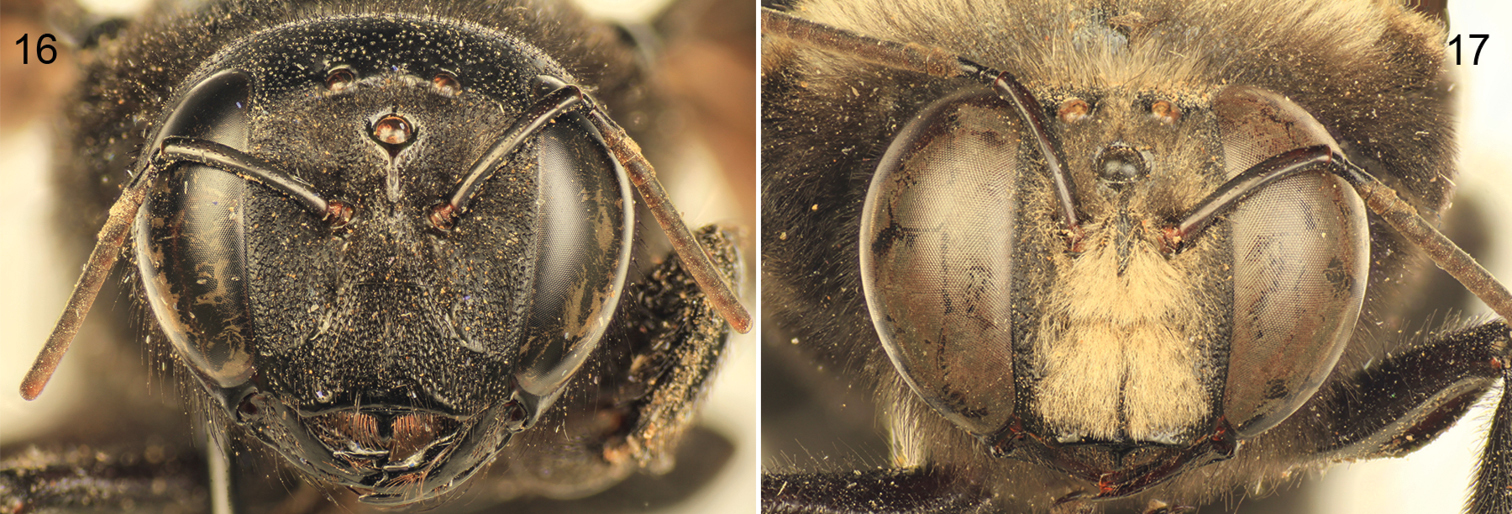
Faces of the X. sulcatipes female (left) and male (right)

== Distribution and habitat ==
X. sulcatipes is a large Arabian carpenter bee. They have been found in Saudi Arabia, Yemen, Palestine, Egypt, and Transcaspia.

X. sulcatipes are known to nest in cane or thin-branch nests. They use plants that are native to their region to build their nests; therefore, materials for nesting may vary. X. sulcatipes nests utilize dead branches, sticks, dead flowering stalks of Ferula spp., or other suitable soft, wooden, tubular objects abandoned by human beings. The holes for their nest entrances are approximately 1.2 cm wide and the tunnels range from 1.2 to 1.6 cm wide and are at least 12 cm long. X. sulcatipes construct their nests in diverse methods; for example, the female bee may cut a hole along the side of the nesting material, enter it, and then make the nest along the grain in one or both directions. They often burrow into substrate that needs little or no digging. Another way X. sulcatipes constructs its nest is by cutting into a pre-existing cut surface or broken cross-section, which they use to gain entry into the substrate. After the structure of the nest has been formed, females linearly layer the walls with pollen and nectar before inserting an egg into the food mass. Finally, the nest is sealed off.

The location of nests may vary from dead branches on the ground or cut wood that was hung above the ground; however, they are normally found in partially shaded areas.

== Colony cycle ==
The nesting season starts early in the spring when males are looking for females to mate with. Some nests of X. sulcatipes may be matrifilial, where the line of descent is from mother to son, while others consist of sisters or unrelated females. Colonies may or may not have reproductive division of labor, which involves some of the reproductive females giving up reproducing in favor of the dominant female. This can occur after oophagy, which results from reproductive competition.

Nesting can either be metasocial or solitary. In a metasocial nest, there is more than one generation of bees occupying and cooperating within a nest. In solitary nesting, the founding bee forages, builds cells, lays the eggs, and guards; normally only one generation of bees live in the nest. Nests can differ in how many female bees live in the nest for extended periods of time. If the nest only has one female living in it, the offspring of the founding mother take on some duties, such as guarding, after they are born and until they leave. Progeny normally leave about 1–2 weeks after emerging.

In other nests, there is more than one female that lives in the nest. In this type of nesting, multiple females either share in the foraging and nest laying, or one female does all the foraging and nest laying, while the other females guard.

== Ontogeny ==
X. sulcatipes eggs are laid in closed cells that are prepared within 1–3 days. Preparation includes pollen gathering and bee-breading. When the eggs hatch, the small larvae feed on the bee-bread while remaining in the same position. A few days afterwards, the larvae begin to move and molt. This second instar takes various positions on the bee-bread. The second molt is followed by the deposition of meconia and exhaustion of the bee-bread supply. Next, the pre-pupal stage starts. This stage lasts several days and ends in pupation. The pupae start out white and get darker with time. The gap in hatching between the youngest and oldest bees increases when the nest gets larger. After the bees hatch, they stay in the nest for some time. While in the nest, the bees do not harm the unhatched bees and are fed by the mother. Once all the bees have hatched, they clear the tunnel of all the broken-down partitions and meconia. The mother stays with her offspring until they are independent, after which she starts building new cells.

== Kin selection ==
X. sulcatipes are known to take part in altruistic behavior. These behaviors may be attributed to guarding and the concessions received from undisturbed broods. A benefit from partaking in such a behavior where the guards are related to the mother bee is that it increases the bee's indirect fitness when they help kin because that helps propagate some small portion of the bee's genes. The guarding behavior of X. sulcatipes is similar to that of Xylocopa pubescens. However, unrelated guards do not receive much genetic gain, as unrelated workers that help guard do not share any common genes with the queen whom is the breeder, and therefore cannot pass on genes they share in common.

== Seasonal activity ==
In order for X. sulcatipes to fly, they must first raise their muscular temperature to 37 °C. However, in order to maintain flight activity, they need to be at a threshold temperature of around 21 °C. Warmer days in the winter trigger X. sulcatipes to eat more of their food supply. While they do not normally fly around in the winter, the frequency of flights they take during the cold season results from how many warm winter days there are. When the weather starts getting warmer, they begin flying more frequently. During May, night temperatures reach 21 °C so X. sulcatipes can start flying out at dawn. They typically stop flying shortly after sunset.

X. sulcatipes nest and lay their eggs in the spring and summer. They are normally not active during the winter months and expend less energy to sustain life. During the winter months, the bees fly around in search of nectar on warm days, which give them just enough nectar and energy to make more trips on warm days during this cold season.

== Behavior ==
=== Territorial behavior ===
X. sulcatipes males are known to mark and defend their territories by secreting chemicals from their mandibular glands. Chemical analysis showed that the secretions are composed of p-cresol, guaiacol, and vanillin. Territorial males defend their territories either by identifying intruding males through sight or recognizing the distinct odor the encroaching male emits from its mandibular glands. If the visitor is a female it is not chased out. Sometimes, if a reconstituted pheromonal secretion is treated to the female, it is dealt with as if it were a male and chased out of the territory.

Other territorial behaviors include the flight of males from one nest to another, aggregating in a mass around flowering trees where each male defends a small section of the area around the tree. Males also cruise and defend their own plant or plants. Another behavior includes a massive flight of males flying around the canes that females nest in. The territorial mechanism used depends on what is being defended and the location. For example, if flowers that females feed on are more dispersed and close to their nesting sites, males may defend their own flower or flowers as a strategy.

=== Mating behavior ===
X. sulcatipes males chase after anything that is approximately their own size. If it happens to be a female, the male will follow the female to the flower she is seeking. He will fly over her with his antennae outstretched above her abdomen. If the female wants to mate, she will spread her wings and release an odor from her mandibular glands. This secretion is a signal to the male and he continues to hover over her until she leaves the flower. As the female flies off the flower, the male grasps her in the air, and they copulate while in flight. While copulating, the male is turned 60° to the female. Many times the male will follow the female after copulation.

==== Resource defense polygyny ====
Because males defend areas near nesting or flowering sites, female and/or resource defense polygyny is common. Resource defense polygyny is when males acquire females by taking control of limited resources such as food and nesting sites. Females can gain access to these resources by mating with the males that defend these territories. Males can copulate with the best mate by defending the best resource because females are more attracted to these better resources. Therefore, the male will mate with multiple females that come to use the resources that the male is defending.

=== Nesting behavior ===
Most X. sulcatipes are asleep at night. A common sleeping position for X. sulcatipes is laying on their dorsum with their face turned upward on top of a pollen slant. A female in the nest spends much of her time licking the walls of the nest tunnels or the walls where she is about to build a new nest. They also tap the walls of the tunnel with their abdomen, which secretes chemicals. X. sulcatipes have also been found to walk around with their sting-chamber open; this behavior is attributed to having to do with the release of contents from glands that open from the chamber. The secretions coat the walls of the nest with a thin, transparent film.

Only minor cleanings are routinely done in the nest. Major nest cleanings take place during and right after tunnel excavation, and when all the offspring have hatched. Pupal skins, broken cell partitions, meconia, and the remnants of development cells are discarded. There is no need to remove defecation from adult bees because this takes place outside the entrance hole or away from the nest.

== Defense ==
In nest defense, there is competition among conspecific females for nesting sites. As the population of X. sulcatipes increases in a region, competition also increases. This increase in competition results in an intensive guarding of nests, especially in the spring and summer when it is prime nesting season. Nest guarding can be against bees of the same species or against those of other species.

=== Parasites ===
X. sulcatipes nests have been found to be invaded by termites, in particular nests on Ferula plants in the deserts around Sede-Boqer. Once the termites get into the nest, they take apart the walls and fill it with refuse. The bees may respond by stopping tunnel digging once they are aware of termite damage.

=== Predators ===
Other insects may also pose a threat to X. sulcatipes; for example, a female praying mantis (Sphodromantis viridis) was observed catching and eating a male X. sulcatipes.

== Diet ==
X. sulcatipes visit flowers for both pollen and nectar collection. In the Arava Valley, Calotropis procera, Retama raetam, Acacia tortilis, and A. raddianna are native plants most commonly visited. Certain plants are preferred in different seasons. For example, C. procera only gives nectar to the bees and blooms from March to September. Retama raetam blooms for only a short period of time between March and April. X. sulcatipes collects nectar by settling on a flower and inserting their proboscises. They mix the gathered nectar and pollen at irregular intervals, which leads to a variability in bee bread sizes and different adult bee sizes.

== Interactions with humans ==
Plant species cultivated for human consumption are commonly visited by X. sulcatipes for their nectar and pollen. In the Arava Valley, these include Cassia spp., Lucaena glauca, Solanum elaeagnifolium, and Vitex agnus-castus.
