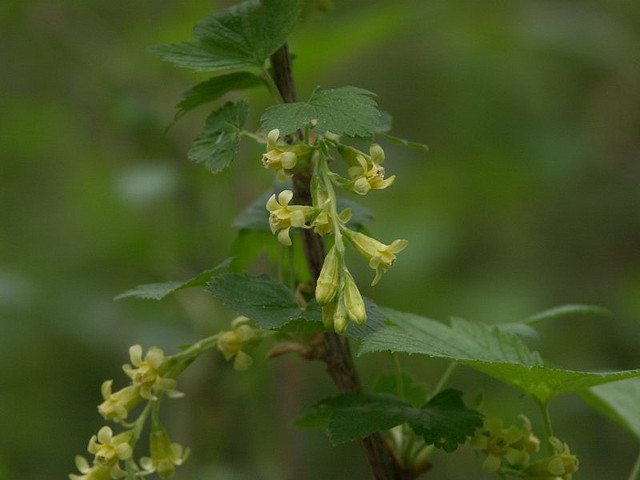

Conservation status
- Secure (NatureServe)

Scientific classification
- Kingdom: Plantae
- Clade: Tracheophytes
- Clade: Angiosperms
- Clade: Eudicots
- Order: Saxifragales
- Family: Grossulariaceae
- Genus: Ribes
- Species: R. americanum

Binomial name
- Ribes americanum Mill., 1768

Synonyms
- List: Coreosma americana (Mill.) Nieuwl. (1915); Coreosma americana var. mesochora Nieuwl. (1915); Coreosma florida (L'Hér.) Spach (1835); Ribes billenei Medik. (1799); Ribes campanulatum Moench (1794); Ribes dillenii Medik. (1783); Ribes floridum L'Hér. (1785); Ribes floridum var. grandiflorum Loudon (1838); Ribes heterotrichum K.Koch (1869); Ribes intermedium Tausch (1838); Ribes nigrum var. pennyslvanicum Marshall (1785); Ribes pensylvanicum Lam. (1789); Ribes recurvatum Michx. (1803); Ribes schmidtianum Tausch (1838); Ribesium campanulatum (Moench) Medik. (1799); Ribesium dillenii (Medik.) Medik. (1789)

= Ribes americanum =

North American species of currant

Ribes americanum is a North American species of flowering plant in the gooseberry family known as wild black currant, American black currant, and eastern black currant. It is widespread in much of Canada (from Alberta to Nova Scotia) and the northern United States (from New England to Washington, with additional populations in Colorado and New Mexico).

== Description ==
Ribes americanum is a shrub growing 0.5 to 1.5 meters (20-60 inches) in height. The branches are erect and bear deciduous leaves. There are no spines. The plant may form thickets. The glandular leaves are up to 7–8 cm (3–3 in) long and have 3 or 5 lobes. They turn red and gold in the fall.

The inflorescence is a spreading or drooping raceme of up to 15 flowers. Each flower has reflexed white or greenish sepals a few millimeters long and smaller whitish petals. The fruit is a smooth rounded black berry about a centimeter (0.4 inch) wide and edible when cooked. The plant reproduces mostly by seed.

== Distribution and habitat ==
This shrub is native to the United States and Canada where grows in a variety of ecosystems. It occurs in many types of forests and in conifer bogs. In Manitoba it can be found in marshes. In the Great Lakes region it grows abundantly in sedge meadows (Carex spp.). Ribes americanum grows on plains and in mountains and sometimes in disturbed areas such as roadsides. It is also shade-tolerant, growing in the understory of closed-canopy woodlands and forests.

It has also been introduced to northern China.

== Ecology ==
Several bee species visit the flowers: Augochlora pura, Augochlorella aurata, Ceratina calcarata, Ceratina dupla, and Ceratina strenua.

This plant is an alternate host for the white pine blister rust (Cronartium ribicola), the vector of a pine tree disease. It is sometimes eradicated in attempts to control the rust.

The cluster cup rust (Puccinia caricina) forms aecia on the leaves of Ribes americanum in the spring, later developing brown blotches of pustules. The telia are formed on sedges (Carex).

== Uses ==
Native Americans made pemmican from the berries, which are also known for being made into jam and jelly.
