= Dupla =

Dupla may refer to:

== Species ==
- Bertelia dupla, species of snout moth
- Campiglossa dupla, species of tephritid
- Ceratina dupla, species of small carpenter bee
- Eudonia dupla, species of moth
- Megachile dupla, species of bee

== Other uses ==
- Dupla Identidade, television series
