= Ceratina picta =

Scientific classification
- Kingdom: Animalia
- Phylum: Arthropoda
- Class: Insecta
- Order: Hymenoptera
- Family: Apidae
- Genus: Ceratina
- Species: C. picta

Binomial name
- Ceratina picta Smith, 1854

Species of bee

Ceratina picta, also known as Ceratina (Xanthoceratina) picta, is a species of bee belonging to the family Apidae subfamily Xylocopinae. It is endemic to Sri Lanka.
