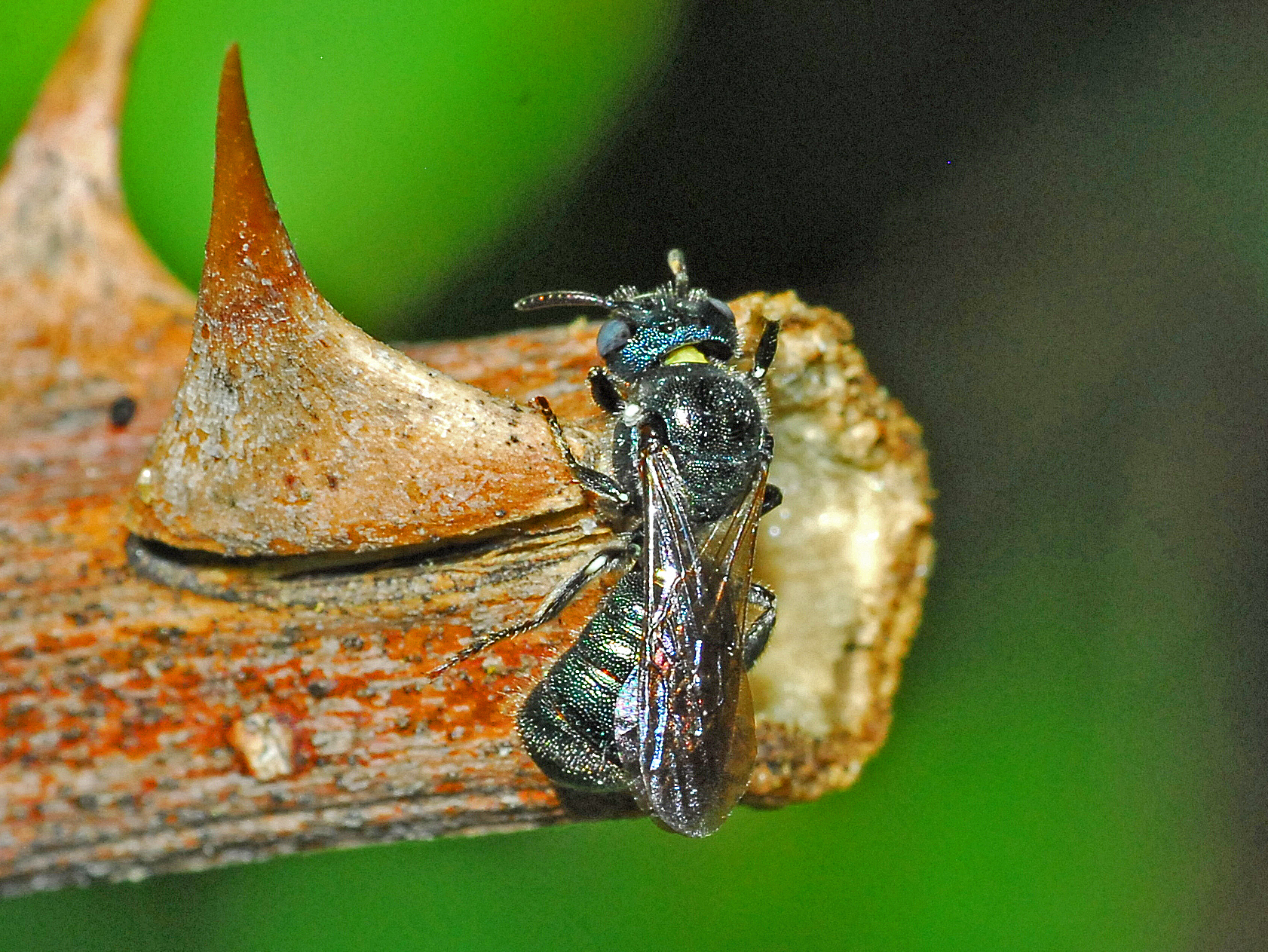
- Female of Ceratina cyanea close to the nest

Scientific classification
- Kingdom: Animalia
- Phylum: Arthropoda
- Class: Insecta
- Order: Hymenoptera
- Family: Apidae
- Genus: Ceratina
- Species: C. cyanea

Binomial name
- Ceratina cyanea (Kirby, 1802)

Synonyms
- Apis cyanea Kirby, 1802

= Ceratina cyanea =

Species of bee

Ceratina cyanea, common name blue carpenter bee, is a species of bee belonging to the family Apidae, subfamily Xylocopinae.

== Distribution ==
This species is present in most of Western Europe, in North West Africa and in the eastern Palearctic realm (excluding China).

== Habitat ==
This undemanding species colonize both dry habitats and wetlands. It inhabits forest edges, thickets and gardens.

== Description ==
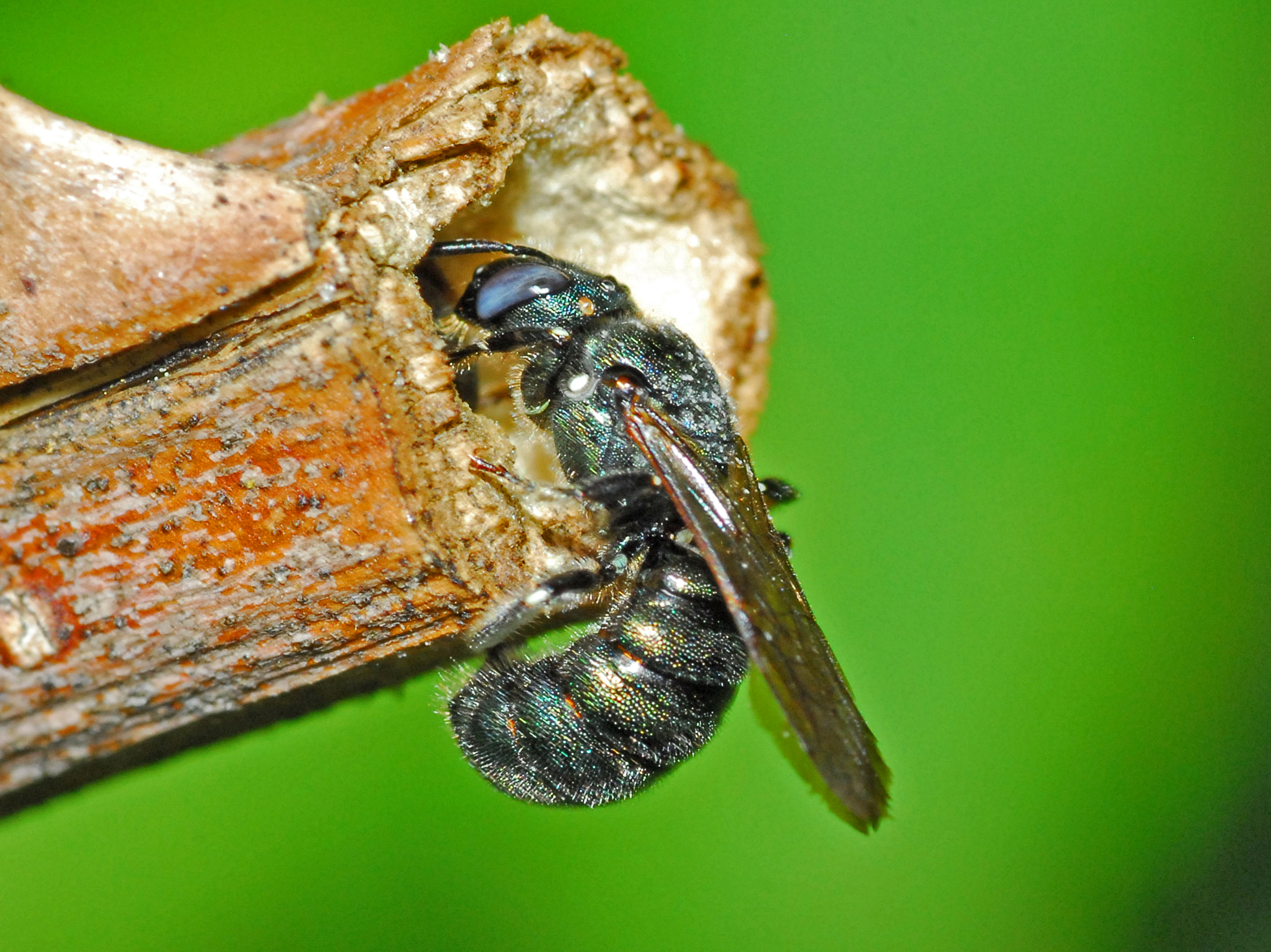
Digging the nest

Ceratina cyanea can reach a length of 5–9 millimetres (0.20–0.35 in) (females) and 5–7 millimetres (0.20–0.28 in) (males). Head, chest and abdomen show a metallic blue colour. These bees have three submarginal cells in forewings, club-shaped antennae and a long thin tongue. The scutellum is densely punctured. The seventh tergite has a deep saddle and ends in two points.

== Biology ==
The blue carpenter bees fly from mid-March to mid-October, collecting pollen at various families of plants, especially knapweed (Centaurea), yellow composites (Asteraceae) and Lotus (Fabaceae).

Females dig the nest extracting the soft tissue that fills the cavities of the vertical or slanted dry plant stems and small branches, such as thistles, blackberries (Rubus species), elderberries (Sambucus species) and roses. Then they provide the cells with a mixture of regurgitated nectar and pollen to feed the larvae. Adult males and females overwinter inside their cells into the stems. Often several insects spend the winter together.
