= Ceratina beata =

Scientific classification
- Kingdom: Animalia
- Phylum: Arthropoda
- Class: Insecta
- Order: Hymenoptera
- Family: Apidae
- Genus: Ceratina
- Species: C. beata

Binomial name
- Ceratina beata Cameron, 1897

Species of bee

Ceratina beata, also known as Ceratina (Xanthoceratina) beata, is a species of bee belonging to the family Apidae, subfamily Xylocopinae.
