= Ceratina tanganyicensis =

Scientific classification
- Kingdom: Animalia
- Phylum: Arthropoda
- Class: Insecta
- Order: Hymenoptera
- Family: Apidae
- Genus: Ceratina
- Species: C. tanganyicensis

Binomial name
- Ceratina tanganyicensis Strand, 1911

Species of bee

Ceratina tanganyicensis, also known as Ceratina (Simioceratina) tanganyicensis, is a species of bee belonging to the family Apidae, subfamily Xylocopinae.
