= Ceratina binghami =

Scientific classification
- Kingdom: Animalia
- Phylum: Arthropoda
- Class: Insecta
- Order: Hymenoptera
- Family: Apidae
- Genus: Ceratina
- Species: C. binghami

Binomial name
- Ceratina binghami Cockerell, 1908

Synonyms
- Ceratina viridissima sensu Bingham, 1897; Pithitis sympatrica Shiokawa and Sakagami, 1969

Species of bee

Ceratina binghami is a species of bee belonging to the family Apidae, subfamily Xylocopinae. It constructs nests in stems of plants such as Caesalpinia pulcherrima and Adenanthera pavonina. Females guard the nest entrance.
