= Ceratina hieroglyphica =

Scientific classification
- Kingdom: Animalia
- Phylum: Arthropoda
- Class: Insecta
- Order: Hymenoptera
- Family: Apidae
- Genus: Ceratina
- Species: C. hieroglyphica

Binomial name
- Ceratina hieroglyphica Smith, 1854

Species of bee

Ceratina hieroglyphica is a species of bee belonging to the family Apidae, subfamily Xylocopinae. It makes its nest out of twigs of multiple plant species, including Anacardium occidentale and Caesalpinia pulcherrima.
