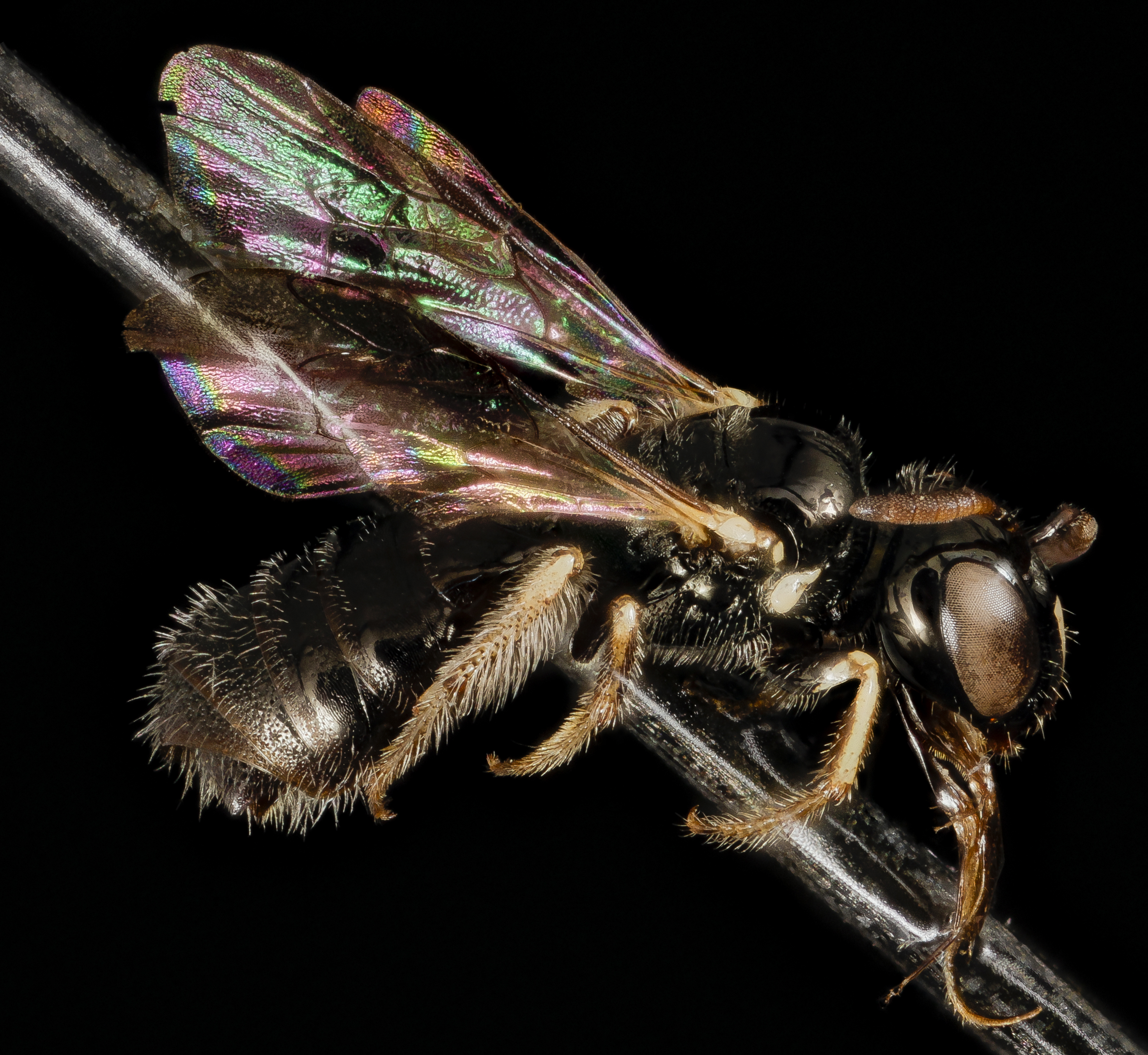

Scientific classification
- Kingdom: Animalia
- Phylum: Arthropoda
- Class: Insecta
- Order: Hymenoptera
- Family: Apidae
- Genus: Ceratina
- Species: C. arizonensis

Binomial name
- Ceratina arizonensis Cockerell, 1898

= Ceratina arizonensis =

Species of bee

Ceratina arizonensis is a species of small carpenter bee in the family Apidae. It is found in Central America and North America.
