= Bertelia =

Scientific classification
- Domain: Eukaryota
- Kingdom: Animalia
- Phylum: Arthropoda
- Class: Insecta
- Order: Lepidoptera
- Family: Pyralidae
- Subfamily: Phycitinae
- Genus: Bertelia; Barnes & McDunnough, 1913

Genus of moths

Bertelia is a genus of snout moths. It was described by William Barnes and James Halliday McDunnough in 1913.

== Species ==
- Bertelia dupla Blanchard, 1976
- Bertelia grisella Barnes & McDunnough, 1913
