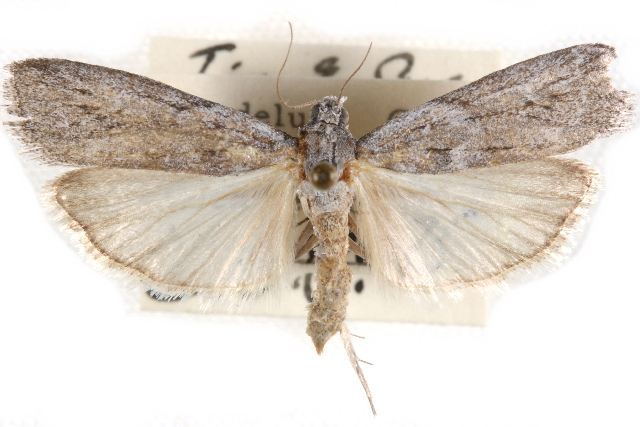

Scientific classification
- Domain: Eukaryota
- Kingdom: Animalia
- Phylum: Arthropoda
- Class: Insecta
- Order: Lepidoptera
- Family: Pyralidae
- Genus: Bertelia
- Species: B. grisella

Binomial name
- Bertelia grisella Barnes & McDunnough, 1913

= Bertelia grisella =

Species of moth

Bertelia grisella is a species of snout moth. It is found in North America, including Arizona.
