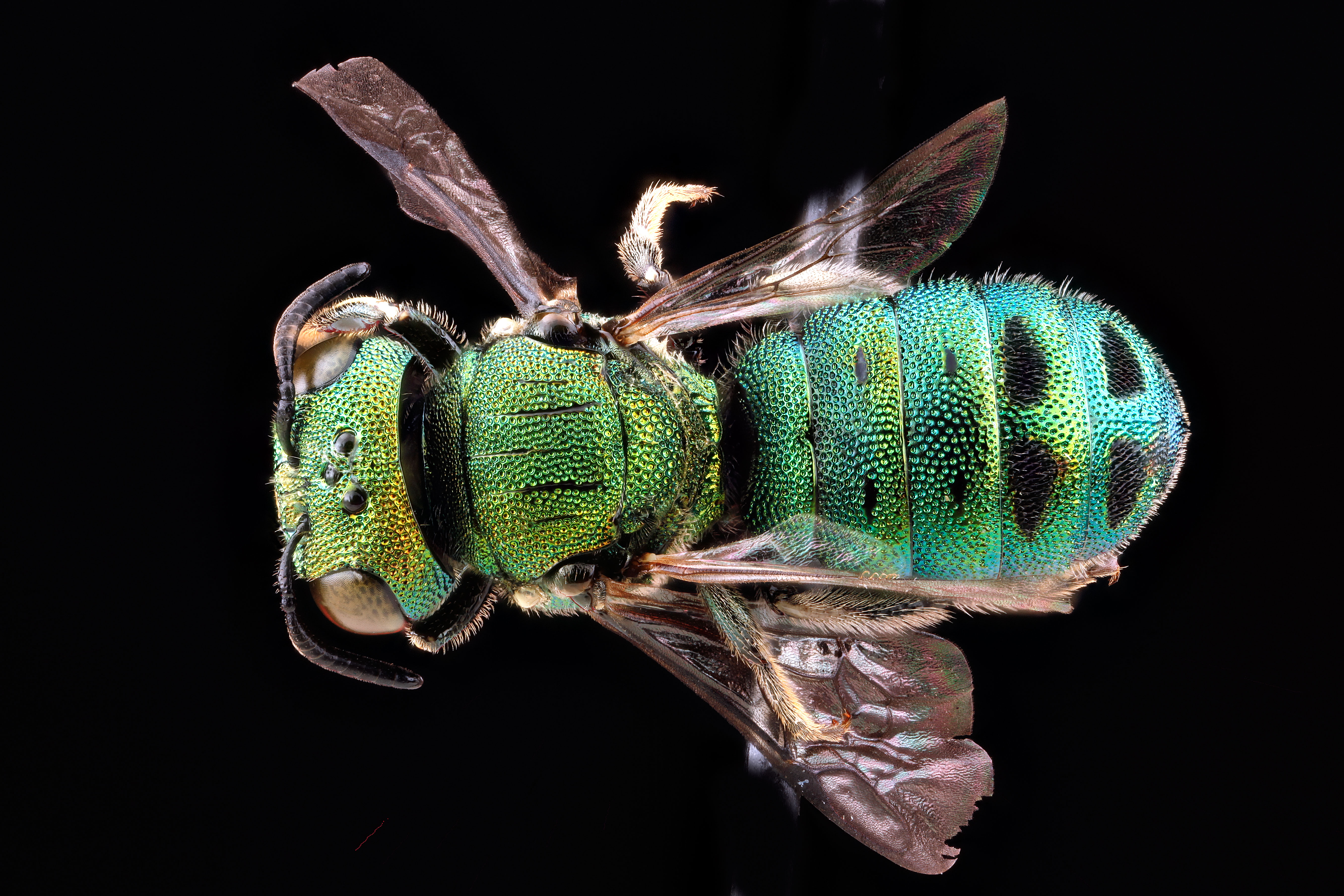

Scientific classification
- Kingdom: Animalia
- Phylum: Arthropoda
- Class: Insecta
- Order: Hymenoptera
- Family: Apidae
- Genus: Ceratina
- Species: C. smaragdula

Binomial name
- Ceratina smaragdula (Fabricius, 1787)

= Ceratina smaragdula =

Species of bee

Ceratina smaragdula, also known as Ceratina (Pithitis) smaragdula, is a species of green metallic bees belonging to the family Apidae, subfamily Xylocopinae.
