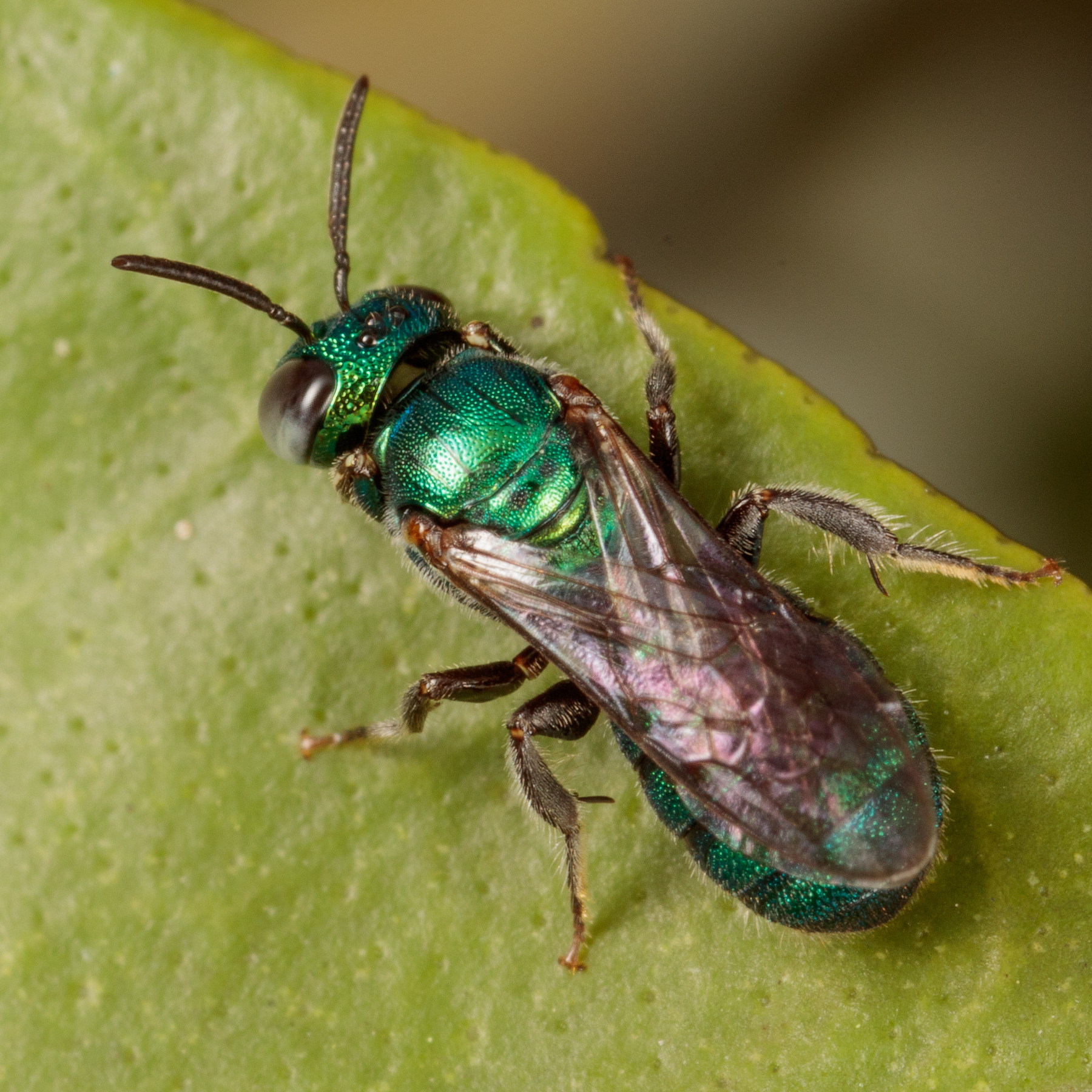

Scientific classification
- Domain: Eukaryota
- Kingdom: Animalia
- Phylum: Arthropoda
- Class: Insecta
- Order: Hymenoptera
- Family: Apidae
- Genus: Ceratina
- Species: C. cobaltina

Binomial name
- Ceratina cobaltina Cresson, 1878

= Ceratina cobaltina =

Species of bee

Ceratina cobaltina is a species of small carpenter bee in the family Apidae. It is found in Central America.
