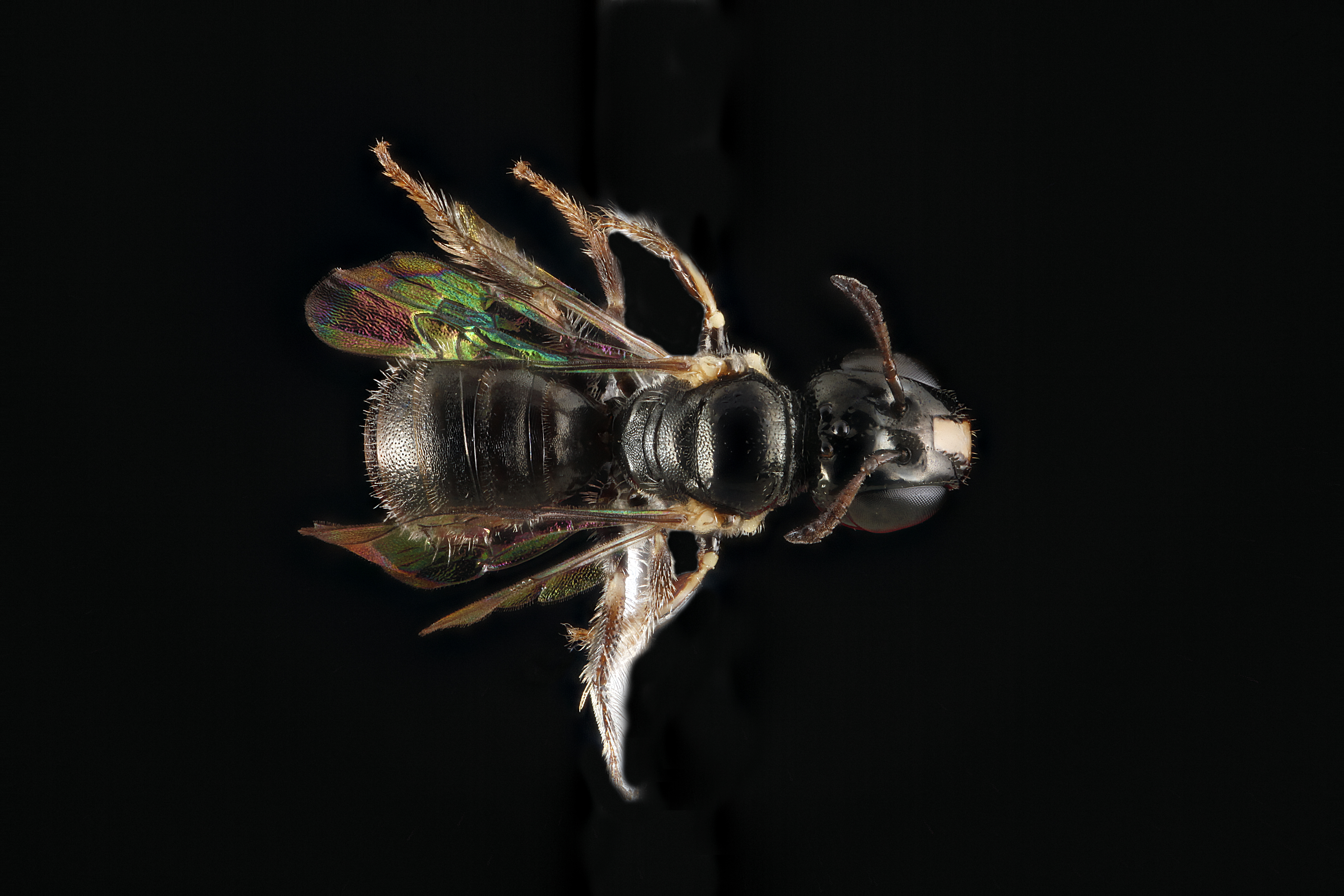

Scientific classification
- Domain: Eukaryota
- Kingdom: Animalia
- Phylum: Arthropoda
- Class: Insecta
- Order: Hymenoptera
- Family: Apidae
- Genus: Ceratina
- Species: C. cockerelli

Binomial name
- Ceratina cockerelli H. S. Smith, 1907

= Ceratina cockerelli =

Species of bee

Ceratina cockerelli is a species of small carpenter bee in the family Apidae. It is found in the Caribbean Sea and North America.
