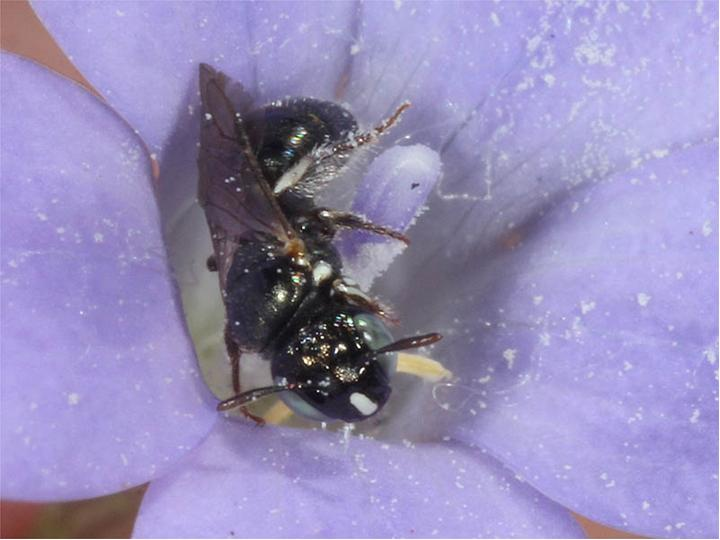

Scientific classification
- Kingdom: Animalia
- Phylum: Arthropoda
- Clade: Pancrustacea
- Class: Insecta
- Order: Hymenoptera
- Family: Apidae
- Genus: Ceratina
- Species: C. australensis

Binomial name
- Ceratina australensis Perkins, 1912

Synonyms
- Neoceratina australensis Perkins, 1912; Allodape bribiensis Cockerell, 1914

= Ceratina australensis =

Species of bee

Ceratina australensis or Ceratina (Neoceratina) australensis, also known as the Australian small carpenter bee, is a species of small carpenter bee. It is endemic to Australia. It was described in 1912 by British entomologist Robert Cyril Layton Perkins.

== Distribution and habitat ==
The species occurs in Queensland, New South Wales, Victoria and South Australia. The type locality is Bribie Island.

== Behaviour ==
The adults are solitary, flying mellivores with solitary larvae. They nest in the dry, pithy stems of plants, including Lantana, Rubus, Verbena and Xanthorrhoea species. Each larva is raised individually in a mass provisioned cell.

The species exhibits all the pre-adaptations for successful group living. It is socially polymorphic with both solitary and social nests collected in sympatry. Social colonies consist of two foundresses, one contributing both foraging and reproductive effort and a second that remains at the nest as a passive guard. Cooperative nesting provides no overt reproductive benefits over solitary nesting, although brood survival tends to be greater in social colonies. Maternal longevity, subsociality and bivoltine nesting phenology favour colony formation, while dispersal habits and offspring longevity may inhibit more frequent social nesting in this and other ceratinines.
