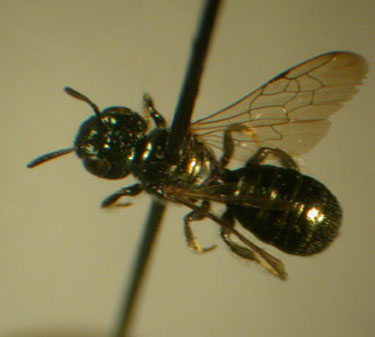

Scientific classification
- Domain: Eukaryota
- Kingdom: Animalia
- Phylum: Arthropoda
- Class: Insecta
- Order: Hymenoptera
- Family: Apidae
- Genus: Ceratina
- Species: C. acantha

Binomial name
- Ceratina acantha Provancher, 1895

= Ceratina acantha =

Species of bee

Ceratina acantha is a species of small carpenter bee in the family Apidae. It is found in Central America and North America. These bees nest in dead twigs.
