= Ceratina sequoiae =

Scientific classification
- Domain: Eukaryota
- Kingdom: Animalia
- Phylum: Arthropoda
- Class: Insecta
- Order: Hymenoptera
- Family: Apidae
- Genus: Ceratina
- Species: C. sequoiae

Binomial name
- Ceratina sequoiae Michener, 1936

Species of bee

Ceratina sequoiae is a species of small carpenter bee in the family Apidae. It is found in North America. It is a specialist on Clarkia flowers.
