= Bertelia dupla =

Scientific classification
- Domain: Eukaryota
- Kingdom: Animalia
- Phylum: Arthropoda
- Class: Insecta
- Order: Lepidoptera
- Family: Pyralidae
- Genus: Bertelia
- Species: B. dupla

Binomial name
- Bertelia dupla Blanchard, 1976

Species of moth

Bertelia dupla is a species of snout moth described by André Blanchard in 1976. It is found in North America, including Texas.

The wingspan is 23–27 mm.
