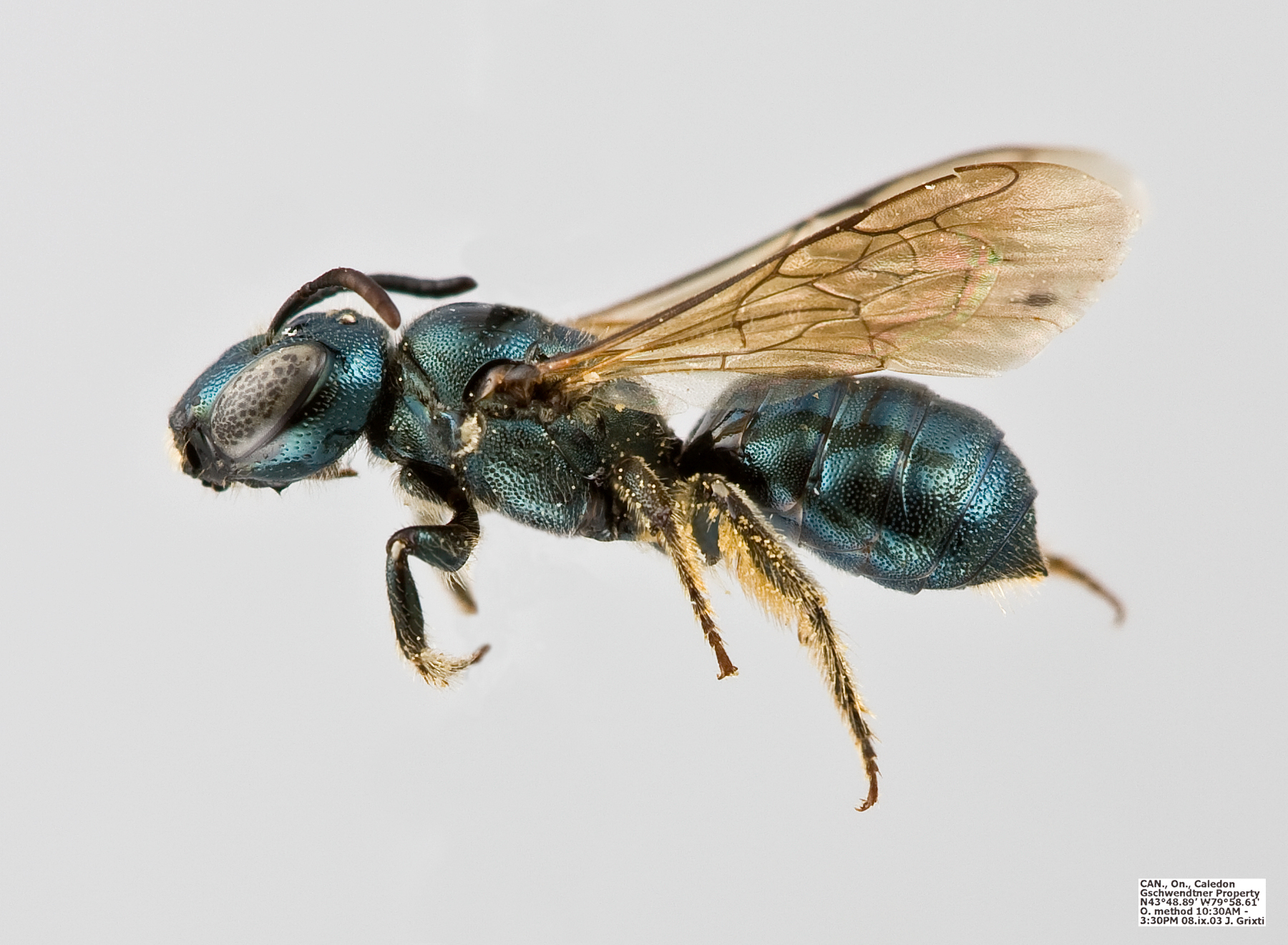
- Female
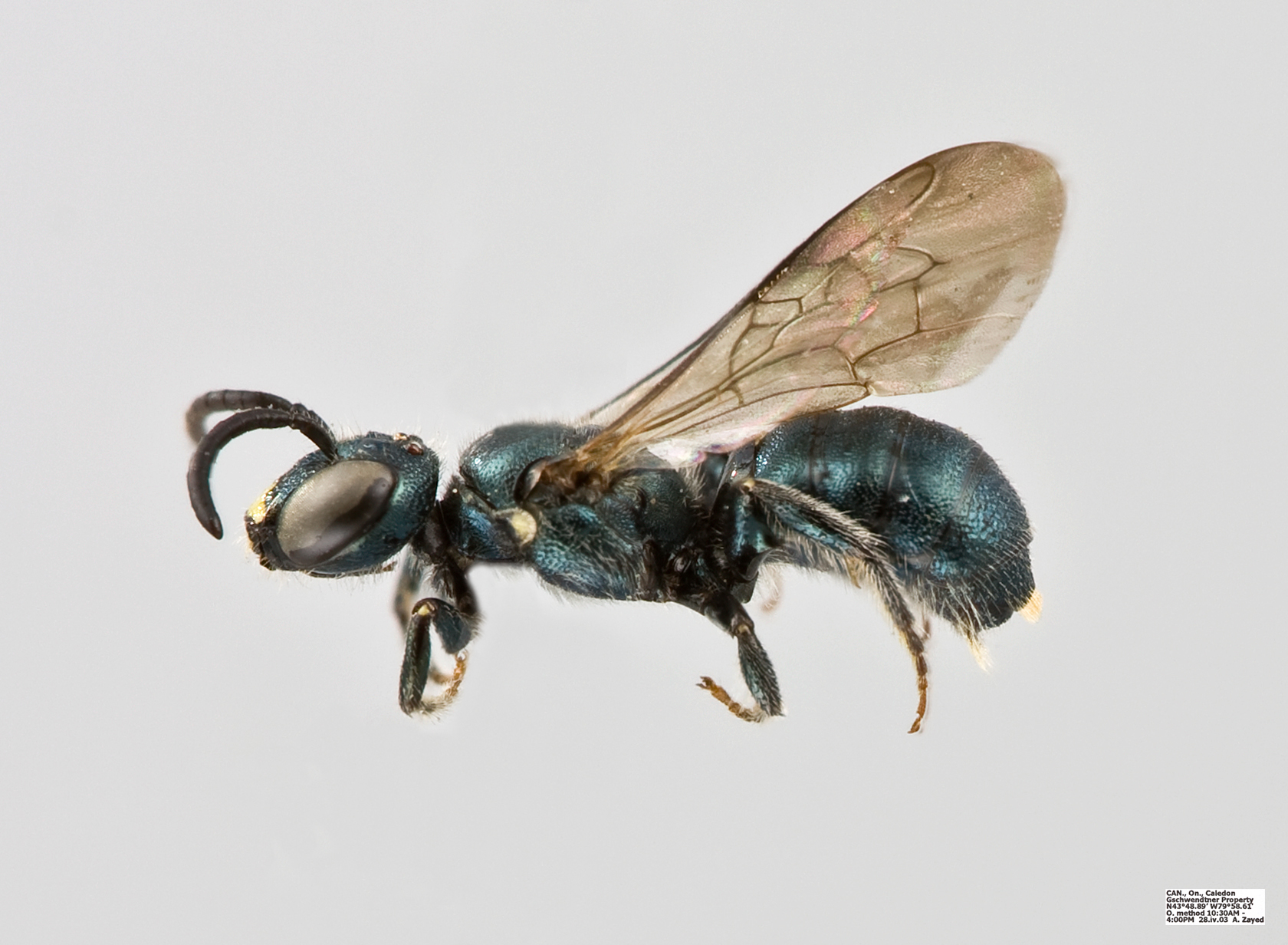
- Male

Conservation status
- Secure (NatureServe)

Scientific classification
- Kingdom: Animalia
- Phylum: Arthropoda
- Clade: Pancrustacea
- Class: Insecta
- Order: Hymenoptera
- Family: Apidae
- Genus: Ceratina
- Species: C. calcarata

Binomial name
- Ceratina calcarata Robertson, 1900

= Ceratina calcarata =

Species of bee

Ceratina calcarata, the spurred ceratina, is a species of small carpenter bee in the family Apidae. It is found in eastern North America. This species ranges from Georgia, USA north to Ontario, Canada and east to Nova Scotia, Canada. This bee is a common generalist, native pollinator, it pollinates plants like watermelon and cucumber very effectively. C. calcarata adds to the productivity of a wide range of ecological and agricultural systems due to its wide range and abundance. This small bee is becoming a model organism in the scientific research of social evolution. C. calcarata is the first subsocial bee species to have its genome published, allowing researchers to investigate the evolutionary origins of social behaviour.

== Reproduction ==
Male eggs are laid on provision masses that are smaller than those that female eggs are laid on. Based on the size of the mother's provision masses, there is a positive association between her size and her foraging capabilities; however, more daughters are not produced by larger mothers as it might be assumed. Larger offspring are more beneficial for C. calcarata because the progeny are more likely to survive the winter months, resulting in an indirect increase in fecundity since the more bees that survive the colder months will be able to procreate and increase the potential number of grand-offspring.

Cuticle hydrocarbons are used to indicate reproductive status and age in C. calcarata; the fertility signal is the hydrocarbon pentacosane. Since the reproductive signal has been discovered, those signals have likely developed the queen bee's pheromones. Typically in eusocial insects, the queen uses pheromonal influence to subdue daughter/worker reproduction; however, in the subsocial Ceratina calcarata, pre-dispersal females have fully developed ovaries and are capable of laying eggs, but they have no chance at becoming fertilized. They are about to enter diapause and will have no chance at having offspring this season, and therefore, queen maternal overexpression of pentacosane is not required for the suppression in offspring regulation.

It has been hypothesized that this bee can use chemical profiles to distinguish between different individuals. This means that based on the chemicals that a particular bee emits, other C. calcarata can tell the difference among specific nest members and non-nest members.

=== Interbreeding with Ceratina dupla ===
Females of C. calcarata and C. dupla look nearly identical; however, the males are dissimilar. The degree of development of a metafemoral tooth is the most visible trait that distinguishes males of the two species. Although interbreeding only occurs in nature where they are sympatric, viable offspring have been produced between these two species of bees. Furthermore, C. calcarata and C. dupla mate at such low rates that they should be treated as two distinct species despite having morphologically exact females.

== Maternal Care ==
Ceratina calcarata is a subsocial bee, meaning that there is extended care of the offspring and prolonged interaction between parent and offspring; however, there are no other interactions between individuals of this species except for mating. Females clean and defend their progeny into adulthood. C. calcarata mothers will feed their newly enclosed offspring twice, which is a behaviour known as called dual-phase pollen provisioning and is typically not observed in all bees. This double feeding most likely helps ensure the youngs' survival during their diapause throughout the winter season. Females create social relationships with their parents and a single generation of children, with the eldest dwarf daughter foraging and feeding her siblings. This dwarf daughter isn't consistently reared in all nests, but when she is, it's thought that she serves as a form of brood insurance during the second phase when the mother bee is unable to give adequate care and provision for her enclosed young.

Mother bees help their offspring develop peaceful behaviours, whereas bees who grow up as orphans are more likely to be violent and aggressive.

Adult size is directly correlated to the quantity of food the individual received as a larva; in order to produce successful female offspring, the mother bee must do more work foraging compared to the work needed to produce male offspring. This is due to the female bee's greater size than their male counterpart. Daughters are roughly 8% larger than sons and 11% smaller than their mothers. Larger bees are more likely to survive the winter and initiate their own successful nests for the next season.

== Nesting ==
The nesting period takes place between late May to early July. Females typically make their nests from small stems and broken twigs; for example, wild carrot, also known as Queen Anne's Lace (Daucus carota) and the multifloral rose (Rosa multiflora). C. calcarata mothers pick both sunny and shady sites to build their nests but typically prefer sunnier areas. Lower temperatures within a species' tolerance limit commonly lead to slower metabolic rates and development, and higher temperatures lead to the opposite. Mother bees can begin nurturing their brood earlier in the season when the nest is warmer, allowing them to develop faster and giving the mother bee more time to bring up more progeny. It also ensures that the offspring are mature enough by the end of the summer, allowing enough time for feeding and mating before overwintering.

=== Overwintering ===
Adult C. calcarata spend their first winter in their natal nests, with males leaving in early May and the females following two weeks later; the new females then venture out to build their own nests. Scientific findings have shown that overwintering C. calcarata have a substantial decrease in protein production related to cellular and muscle structural maintenance, in support of a significant increase in protein production linked to lipid storage and metabolism. Increased lipid storage has been proposed as a crucial trait for overwintering. Many of the molecular mechanisms and genes linked to overwintering in this small carpenter bee were comparable to those found in other insect species, such as enhanced lipid metabolism and changes in proteins associated with muscle and cuticle tissue composition.

==== Agricultural effects ====
Mother bees had more live broods and larger clutch sizes on traditional farms than roadsides and organic farms; brood survival was also the highest in nests on conventional farms due to lack of parasites. The lack of parasites is due to the consistent application of pesticides in agriculturally increased environments. Two-thirds of the females from traditional farm broods have too small of a body size to survive the winter, leading to a steady decrease in the C. calcarata population in agriculture landscapes. It could be possible that the nesting locations in agricultural landscapes of not only C. calcarata but also many other Apidae species be a factor in what is causing their population decline.
