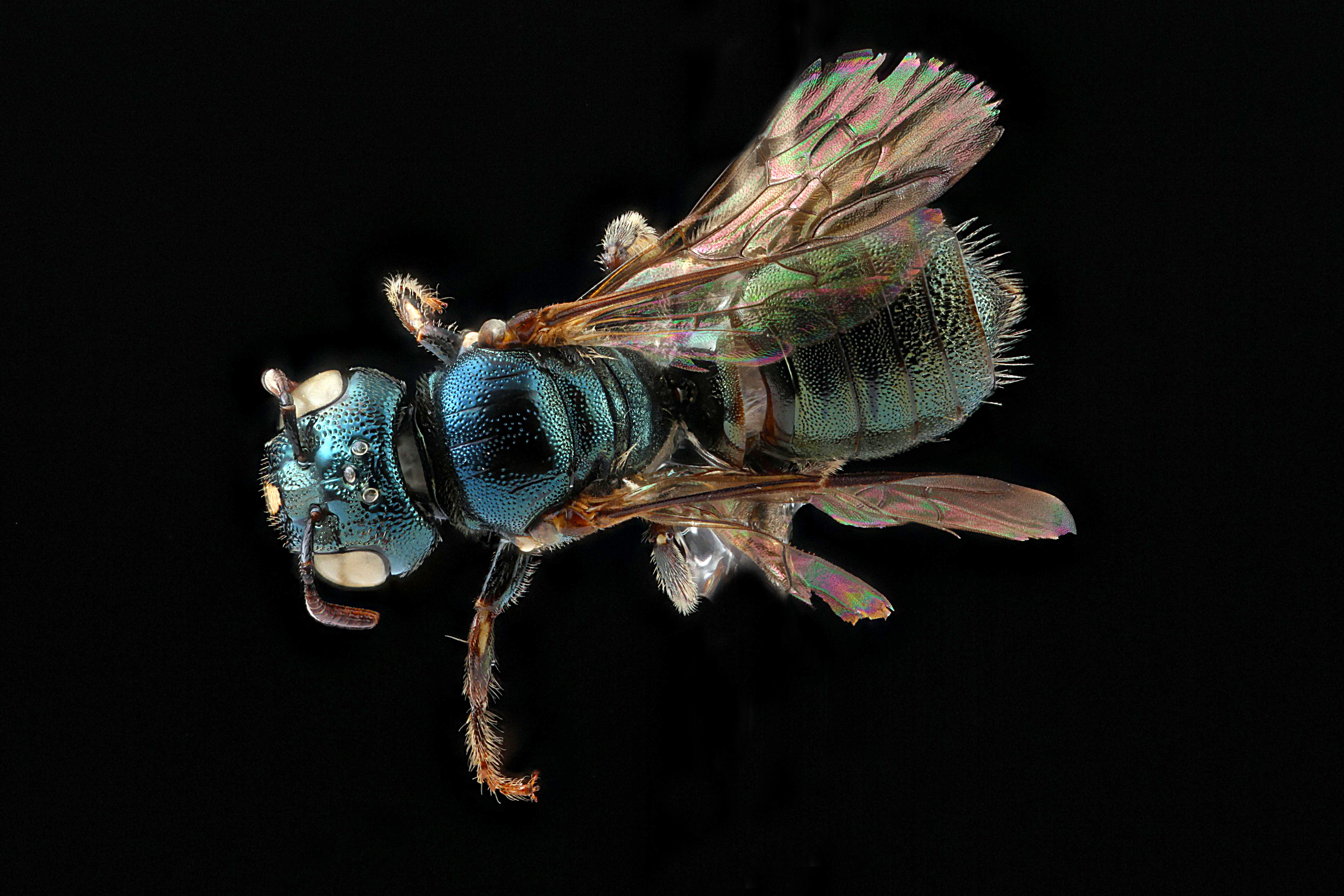

Scientific classification
- Domain: Eukaryota
- Kingdom: Animalia
- Phylum: Arthropoda
- Class: Insecta
- Order: Hymenoptera
- Family: Apidae
- Genus: Ceratina
- Species: C. strenua

Binomial name
- Ceratina strenua Smith, 1879

= Ceratina strenua =

Species of bee

Ceratina strenua, the nimble ceratina, is a species of small carpenter bee in the family Apidae. It is found in North America.
