= Megachile dupla =

Scientific classification
- Domain: Eukaryota
- Kingdom: Animalia
- Phylum: Arthropoda
- Class: Insecta
- Order: Hymenoptera
- Family: Megachilidae
- Genus: Megachile
- Species: M. dupla

Binomial name
- Megachile dupla Ritsema, 1880

Species of leafcutter bee (Megachile)

Megachile dupla is a species of bee in the family Megachilidae. It was described by Ritsema in 1880.
