= Ceratina dallatorreana =

Scientific classification
- Domain: Eukaryota
- Kingdom: Animalia
- Phylum: Arthropoda
- Class: Insecta
- Order: Hymenoptera
- Family: Apidae
- Genus: Ceratina
- Species: C. dallatorreana

Binomial name
- Ceratina dallatorreana Friese, 1896

Species of bee

Ceratina dallatorreana is a species of small carpenter bee in the family Apidae. It is found in Africa, Europe and Northern Asia (excluding China), and North America. This species reproduces by parthenogenesis, and never produces males.
