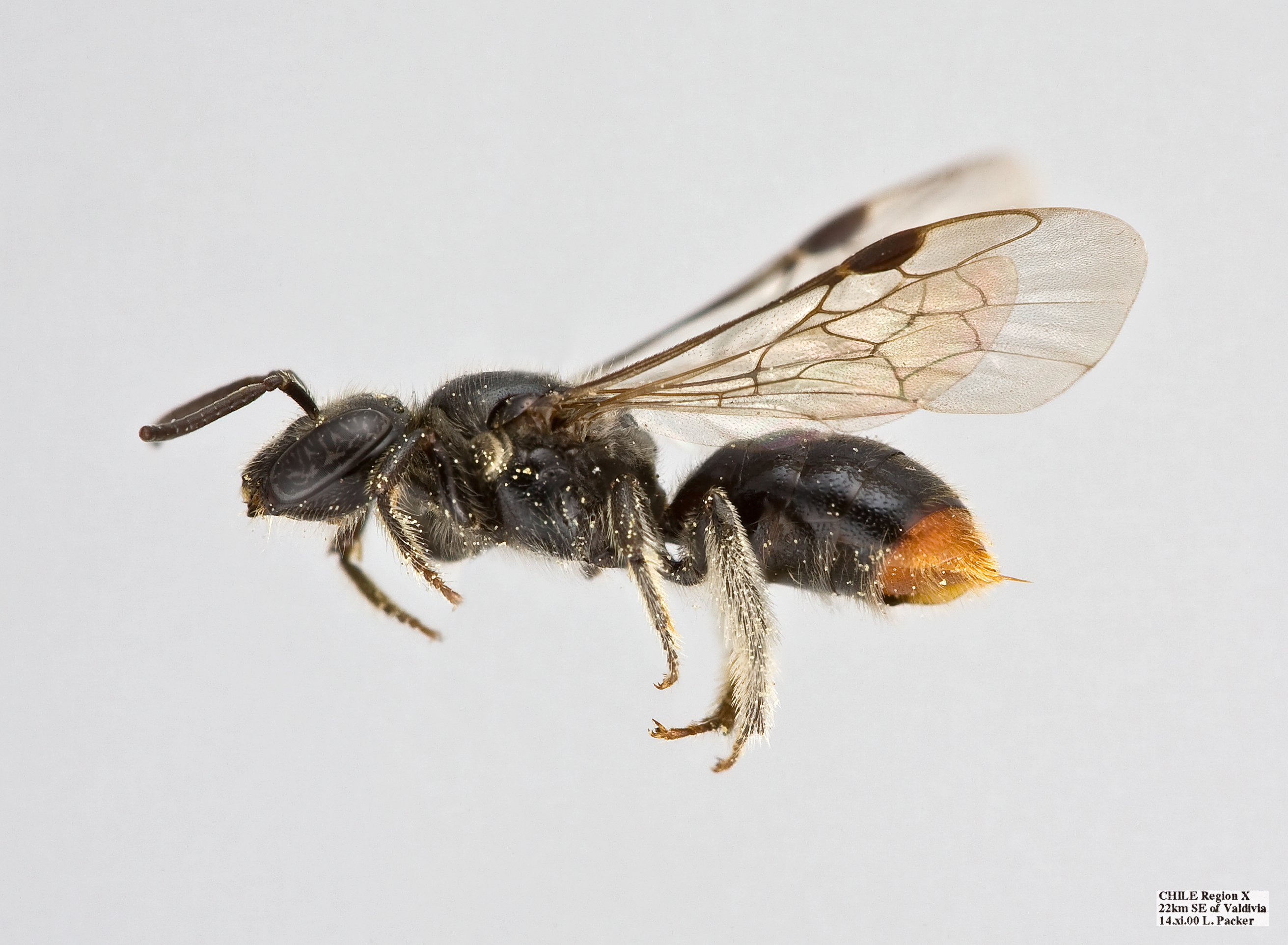
- Manuelia postica, female

Scientific classification
- Domain: Eukaryota
- Kingdom: Animalia
- Phylum: Arthropoda
- Class: Insecta
- Order: Hymenoptera
- Family: Apidae
- Tribe: Manueliini; Sakagami & Michener, 1987
- Genus: Manuelia; Vachal, 1905

Species
- 3, see text

= Manuelia =

Genus of bees

Manuelia is a genus of bees in the subfamily Xylocopinae, the only genus in the tribe Manueliini. There are three species.

This tribe is relictual. Today it is limited to Chile and Argentina.

These are small, slender bees measuring up to 8.5 millimeters long. They may be metallic blue or matte black, sometimes with reddish parts on the abdomen. Because Manuelia species are so distinct from each other, the genus is divided into two subgenera.

== Species ==
- Manuelia gayatina (Spinola, 1851)
- Manuelia gayi (Spinola, 1851)
- Manuelia postica (Spinola, 1851)
