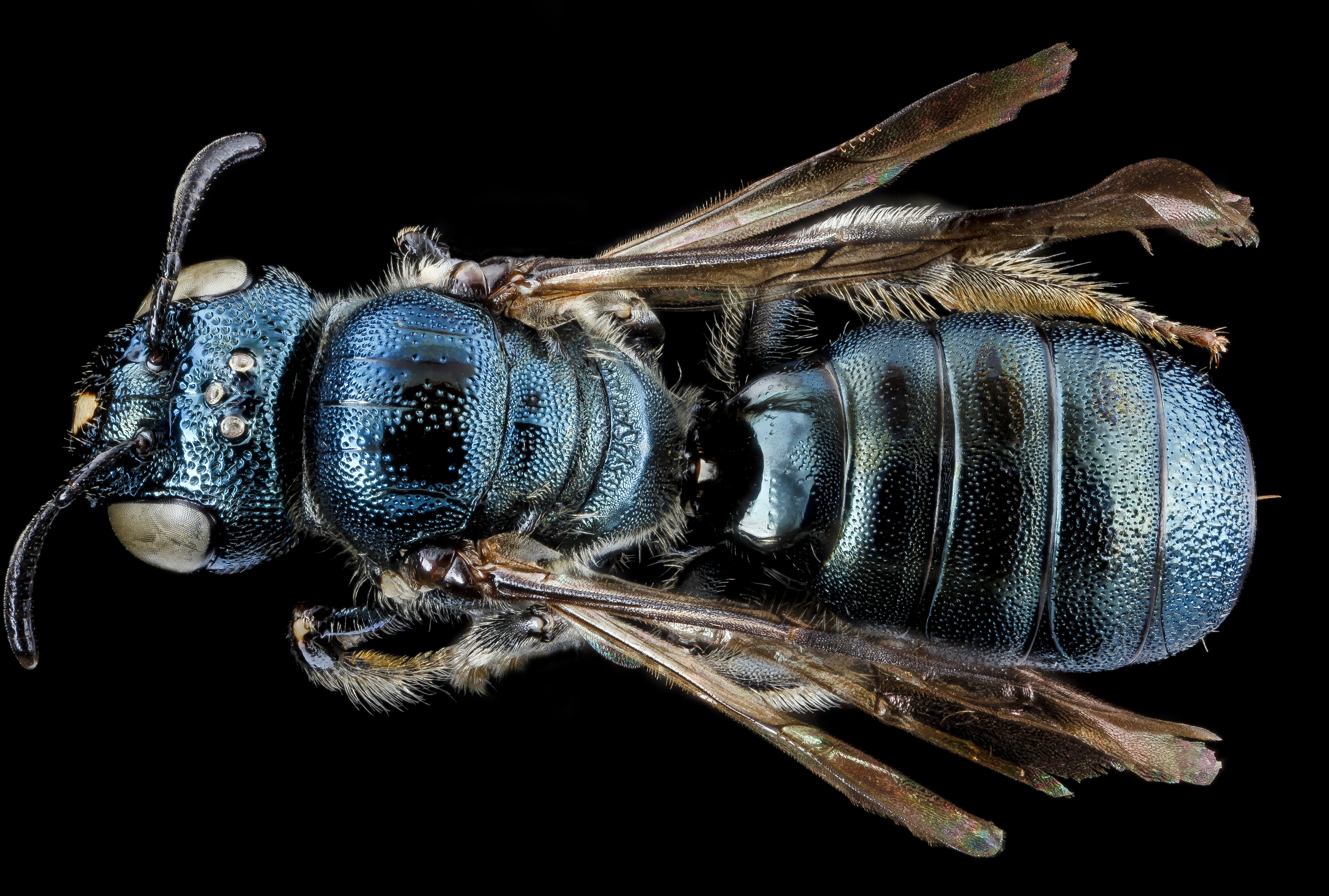

Scientific classification
- Domain: Eukaryota
- Kingdom: Animalia
- Phylum: Arthropoda
- Class: Insecta
- Order: Hymenoptera
- Family: Apidae
- Genus: Ceratina
- Species: C. dupla

Binomial name
- Ceratina dupla Say, 1837

Synonyms
- Halictus ontariensis Provancher, 1882; Ceratina dupla halophila Cockerell, 1911

= Ceratina dupla =

Species of bee

Ceratina dupla, the doubled ceratina, is a species of small carpenter bee in the family Apidae. It is found in the eastern half of North America. It was formerly confused with the species Ceratina floridana and Ceratina mikmaqi, until molecular analyses demonstrated significant genetic differences between the taxa.
