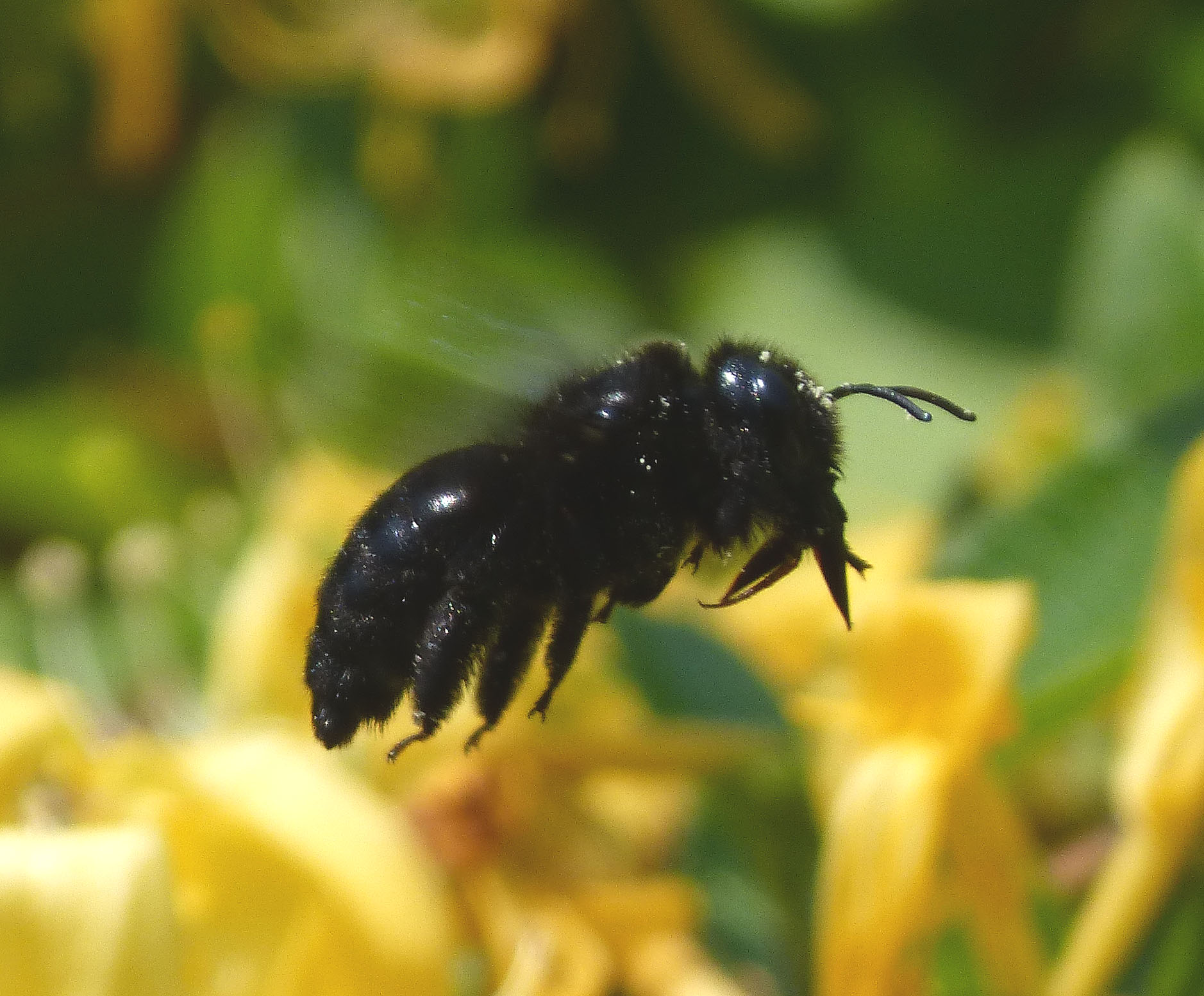
- Xylocopa sp.

Scientific classification
- Kingdom: Animalia
- Phylum: Arthropoda
- Class: Insecta
- Order: Hymenoptera
- Family: Apidae
- Subfamily: Xylocopinae; Latreille, 1802

Tribes
- Allodapini - allodapine bees †Boreallodapini; Ceratinini - small carpenter bees Manueliini; Xylocopini - large carpenter bees

= Xylocopinae =

Xylocopinae Temporal range: 45–Present Ma

Subfamily of bees

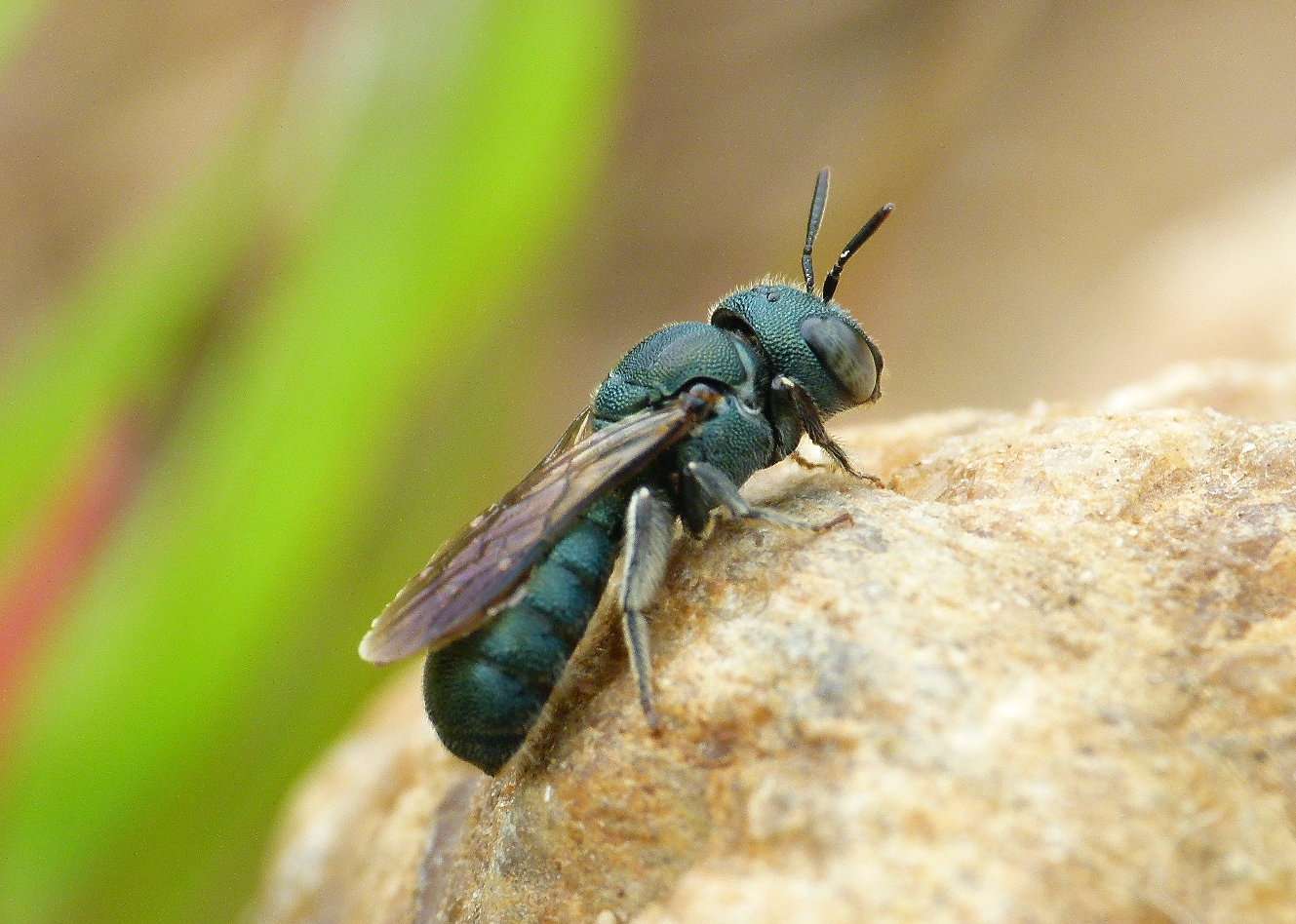
Ceratina sp.

The subfamily Xylocopinae (family Apidae) occurs worldwide, and includes the large carpenter bees (tribe Xylocopini), the small carpenter bees (tribe Ceratinini), the allodapine bees (tribe Allodapini), and the relictual genus Manuelia (tribe Manueliini).

== Subdivisions ==
The Tribes of Xylocopinae are:

- The Xylocopini comprise a single genus, Xylocopa, and occur in worldwide distribution, on all continents except Antarctica.
- The Ceratinini comprise a single genus, Ceratina, with a worldwide distribution.
- The Manueliini comprise a single genus, Manuelia, with only three species, which are restricted to Chile and the Lakes Region in Argentina.
- The Allodapini are restricted to sub-Saharan Africa, Madagascar, Southeast Asia, and Australasia, with a rare genus Exoneuridia also occurring in montane regions of the Middle East.
- The Boreallodapini is extinct, and known from specimens in amber.

== Description ==
Some Xylocopinae have a cavity between the thorax and abdomen, called acarinarium, which provides accommodation for a colony of predatory mites, cleaning their hosts of external parasites.

The vast majority of the Xylocopinae species make nests in dead wood, stems, or pith, and while many are solitary, many are also communal or primitively social. Some genera of Allodapines commonly form eusocial colonies.

== See also ==
- Bee taxa by rank
