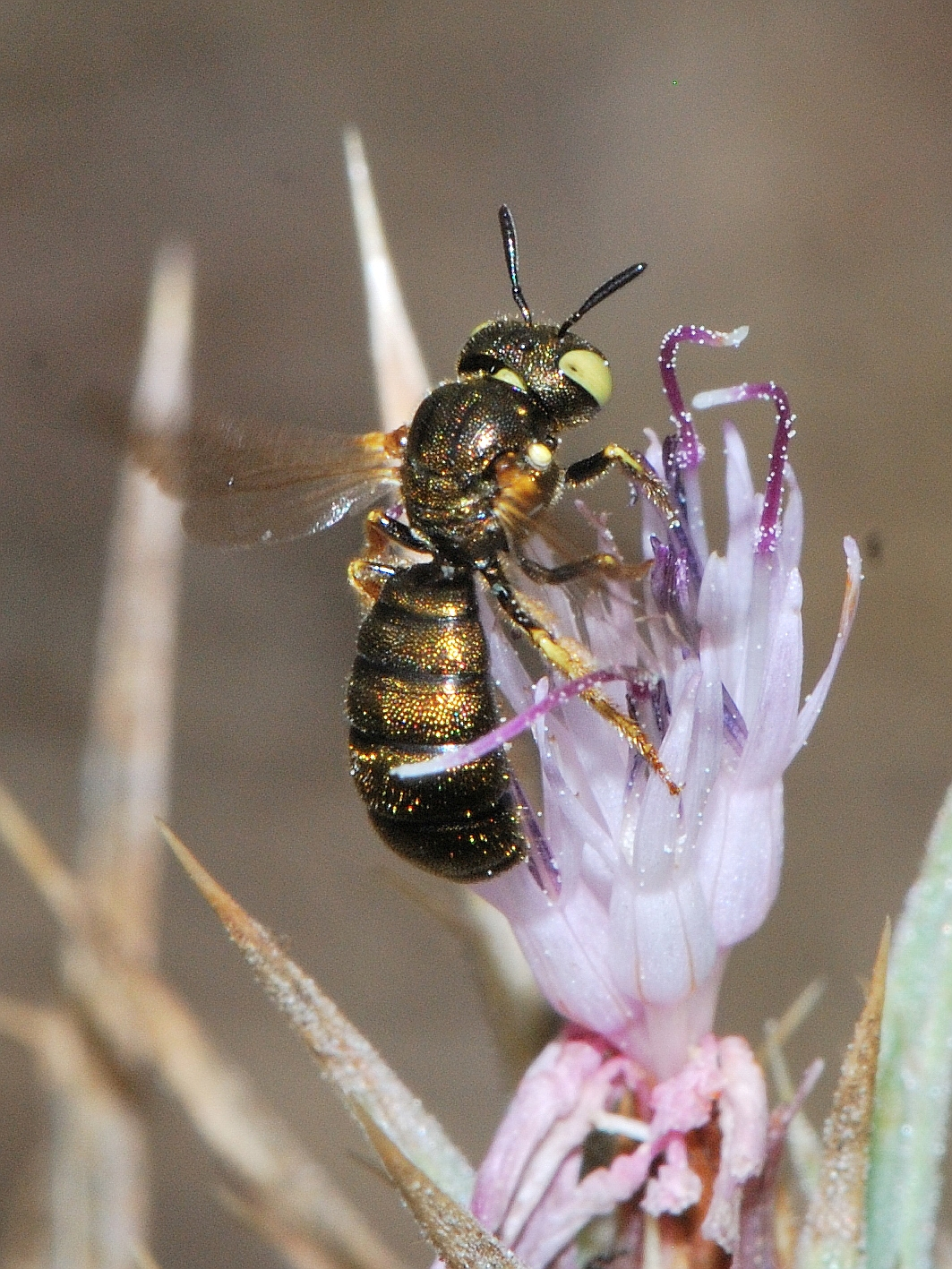
- Ceratina bifida

Scientific classification
- Kingdom: Animalia
- Phylum: Arthropoda
- Clade: Pancrustacea
- Class: Insecta
- Order: Hymenoptera
- Family: Apidae
- Tribe: Ceratinini
- Genus: Ceratina; Latreille, 1802

Type species
- Ceratina cucurbitina (Rossi, 1792)

Species
- >200 species

Synonyms
- Ceratine Illiger, 1807; Dalyatina Terzo, 2007; Megaceratina Hirashima, 1971; Neoclavicera Roig Alsina, 2013

= Ceratina =

Ceratina Temporal range: 37–0 Ma

Genus of bees

The cosmopolitan bee genus Ceratina, often referred to as small carpenter bees, is the sole lineage of the tribe Ceratinini, and is not closely related to the more familiar carpenter bees. The genus presently contains over 300 species in 23 subgenera. They make nests in dead wood, stems, or pith. Although they were considered as mostly solitary in the past, there is growing evidence that many species are facultatively eusocial.

Ceratina are commonly dark, shining, even metallic bees, with fairly sparse body hairs and a weak scopa on the hind tibia. Most species have some yellow markings, most often restricted to the face, but often elsewhere on the body. They are very commonly mistaken for "sweat bees" (family Halictidae), due to their small size, metallic coloration, and some similarity in wing venation; they can be easily separated from halictids by the mouthparts (with a long glossa) and the hindwings (with a tiny jugal lobe).

== Distribution ==
Ceratina have a global distribution and are found on every continent except Antarctica. The genus originated from the Afrotropics before spreading to Europe, Asia, Oceania, and the Americas. New World Ceratina form a single monophyletic clade, suggesting a single colonization event for the Americas. Today, much of the species diversity remains in the Old World tropics, though Australasia contains noticeably few species.

== Behaviour ==
Ceratina bees form nests inside dead plant stems with exposed ends, creating sequential chambers containing pollen balls upon which offspring feed. Chambers are divided using particles of the stem pith.

There can be multiple females in a single nest, where daughters or sisters may form very small, weakly eusocial colonies (where one bee forages and the other remains in the nest and lays eggs). In Ceratina calcarata, division of labour can be seen between the mother and a "dwarf eldest daughter" who stays at the maternal nest to feed her siblings. This "dwarf eldest daughter" is allocated a smaller pollen ball during development, contributing to her smaller size. This behaviour has prompted the study of C. calcarata in order to better understand the origins of social behaviour in social insects.

In Ceratina nigrolabiata, a Mediterranean species, males may guard the opening to the nest of a female they hope to mate with, and are often not the father of the brood within the nest; this is the first bee species in which male nest-guarding has been classified as a form of biparental care, but males guarding nests and mating with females has been documented in other species (e.g., Macrotera portalis).

A few species of Ceratina are exceptional among bees in that they are parthenogenetic, reproducing without males. Parthenogenetic reproduction was genetically confirmed in Ceratina dallatorreana and it is presumed also in Ceratina parvula and Ceratina dentipes.

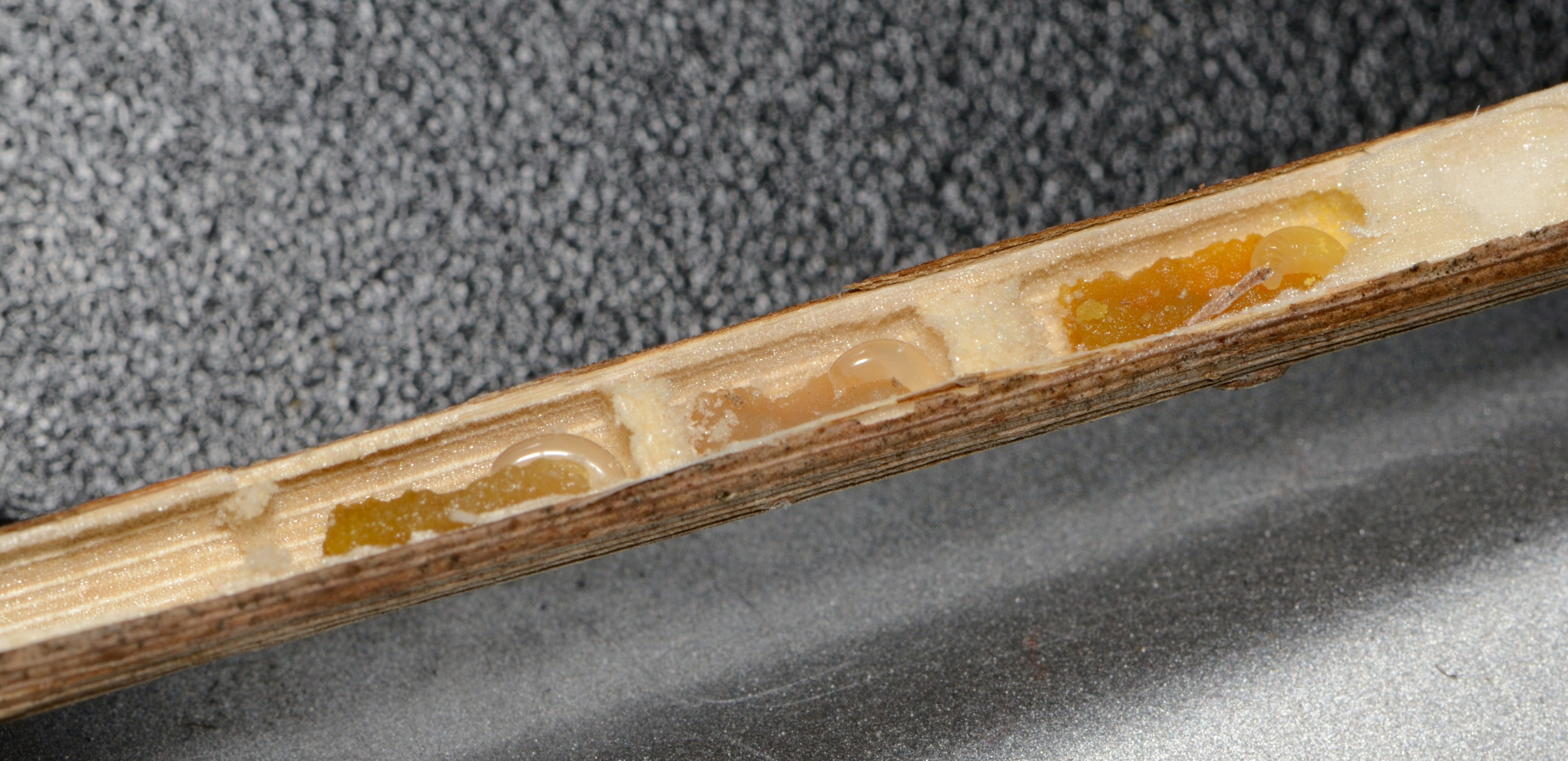
Typical interior structure of a small carpenter bee's nest, here built into a dry stem of fennel. The stem cavity is partitioned into cells, each one containing pollen bread and one offspring. In the lowermost cell (on the right), the larva has already hatched. The other two cells still contain eggs.

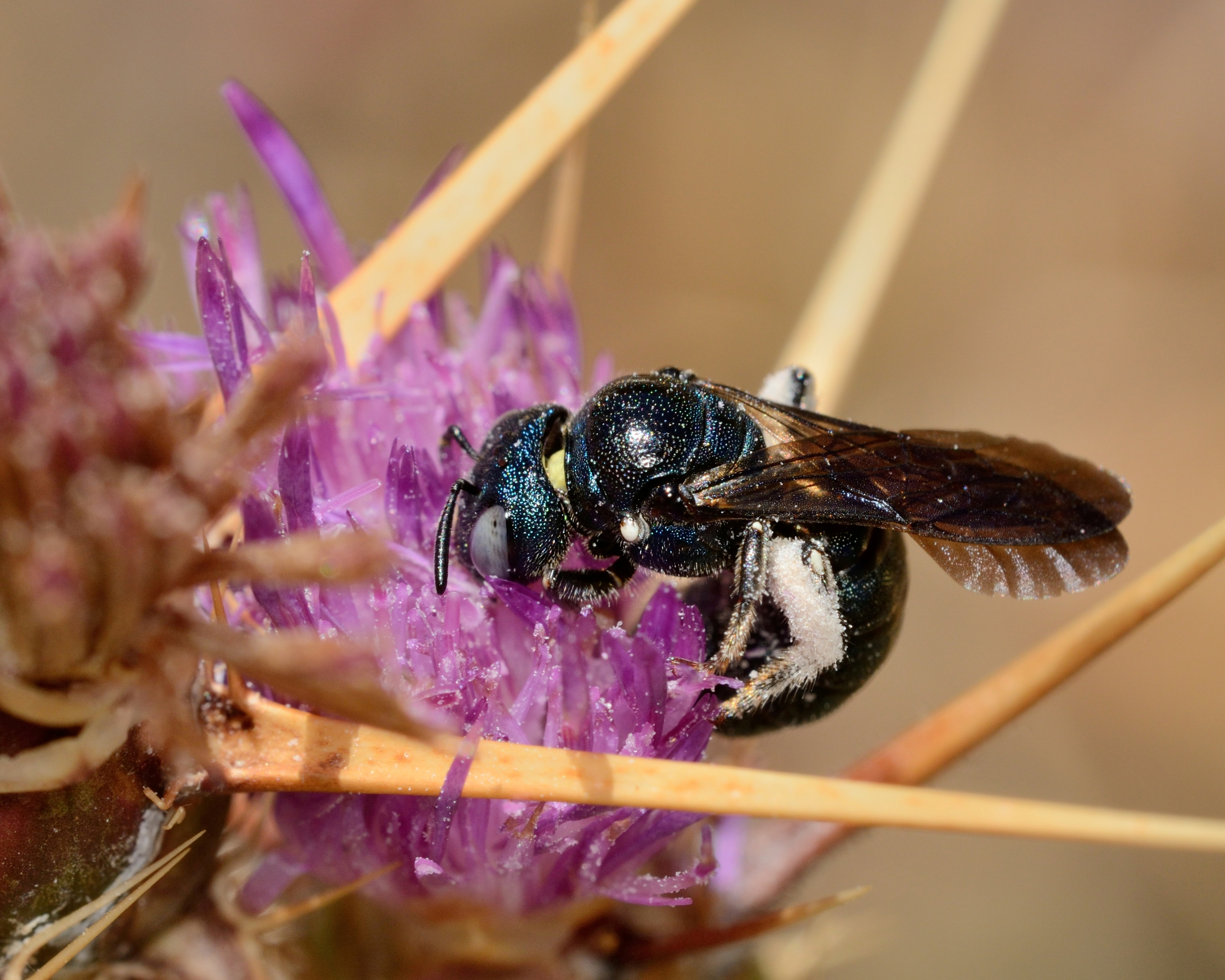
Ceratina chalcites

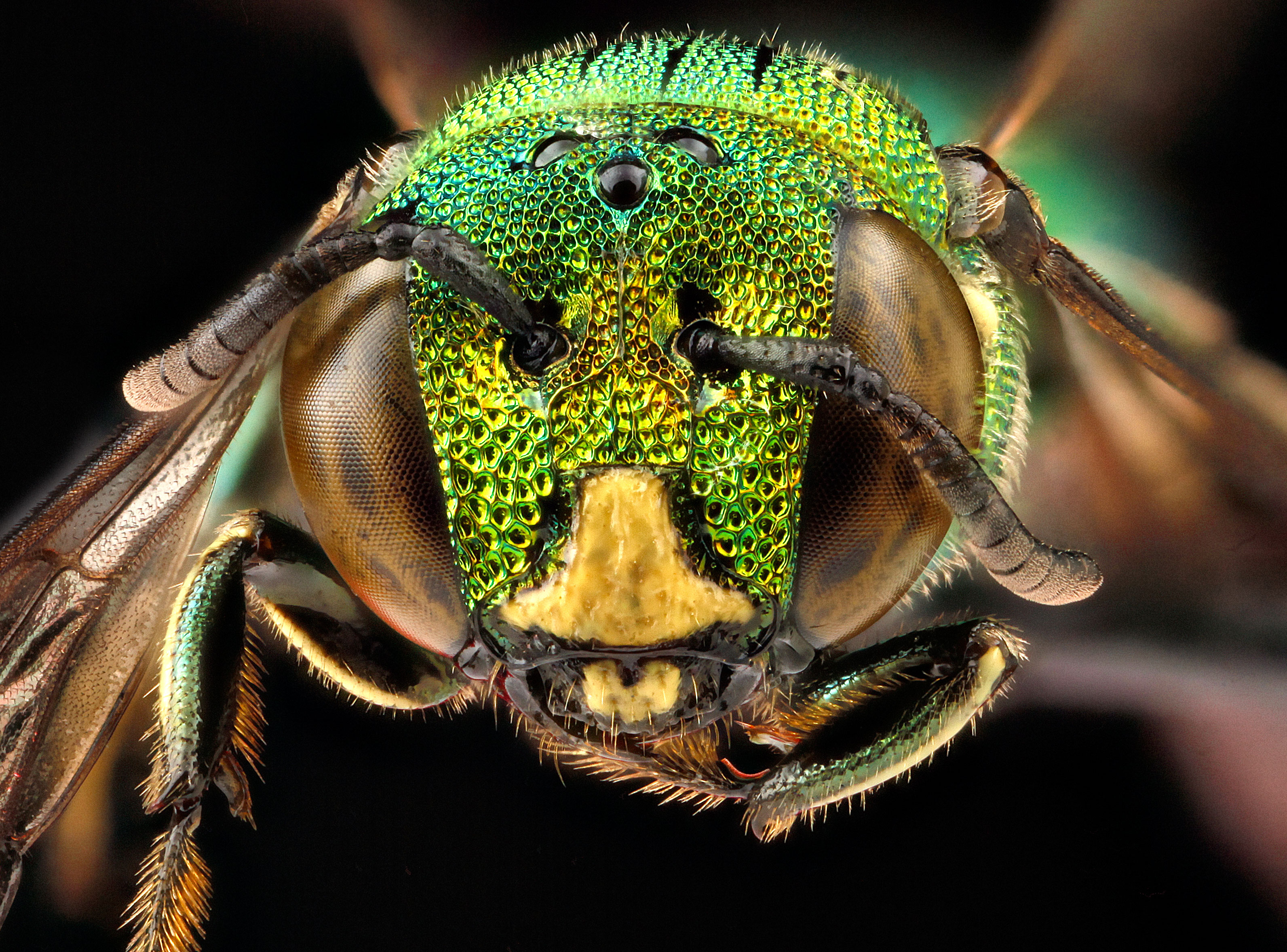
Ceratina smaragdula

Male Ceratina bee foraging on yellow ironweed.

== Species and diversity ==
See: List of Ceratina species

The species in the genus Ceratina are spread across around 20+ subgenera:

- Ceratina (Calloceratina) Cockerell, 1924
- Ceratina (Catoceratina) Vecht, 1952
- Ceratina (Ceratina) Latreille, 1802
- Ceratina (Ceratinidia) Cockerell & Porter, 1899
- Ceratina (Ceratinula) Moure, 1941
- Ceratina (Chloroceratina) Cockerell, 1918
- Ceratina (Copoceratina) Terzo & Pauly, 2001
- Ceratina (Crewella) Cockerell, 1903
- Ceratina (Ctenoceratina) Daly & Moure, 1988
- Ceratina (Dalyatina) Terzo, 2007
- Ceratina (Euceratina) Hirashima, Moure & Daly, 1971
- Ceratina (Hirashima) Terzo & Pauly, 2001
- Ceratina (Lioceratina) Vecht, 1952
- Ceratina (Malgatina) Terzo & Pauly, 2001
- Ceratina (Megaceratina) Hirashima, 1971
- Ceratina (Neoceratina) Perkins, 1912
- Ceratina (Neoclavicera) Roig Alsina, 2013
- Ceratina (Pithitis) Klug, 1807
- Ceratina (Protopithitis) Hirashima, 1969
- Ceratina (Rhysoceratina) Michener, 2000
- Ceratina (Scuticeratina) Sless, Tucker & Rehan, 2026
- Ceratina (Simioceratina) Daly & Moure, 1988
- Ceratina (Xanthoceratina) Vecht, 1952
- Ceratina (Zadontomerus) Ashmead, 1899
