= Canestriniidae =

Scientific classification
- Kingdom: Animalia
- Phylum: Arthropoda
- Subphylum: Chelicerata
- Class: Arachnida
- Order: Sarcoptiformes
- Superfamily: Canestrinioidea
- Family: Canestriniidae; Berlese, 1884

Genera
- Apalotacarus Summers & Schuster, 1981

Family of mites

Canestriniidae is a family of mites belonging to the superfamily Canestrinioidea. It contains 343 accepted species under 99 genera.
