= Apalotacarus =

Scientific classification
- Kingdom: Animalia
- Phylum: Arthropoda
- Subphylum: Chelicerata
- Class: Arachnida
- Order: Sarcoptiformes
- Family: Canestriniidae
- Genus: Apalotacarus; Summers & Schuster, 1981

Genus of mites

Apalotacarus is a genus of mites belonging to the family Canestriniidae.

Species:

- Apalotacarus aristatus Summers & Schuster, 1981
- Apalotacarus trullus Summers & Schuster, 1981
- Apalotacarus aristatus Summers & Schuster, 1981
- Apalotacarus cidaris Summers & Schuster, 1981
- Apalotacarus echinatus Summers & Schuster, 1981
- Apalotacarus fulgens Summers & Schuster, 1981
- Apalotacarus fusticulus Summers & Schuster, 1981
- Apalotacarus fusulus Summers & Schuster, 1981
- Apalotacarus glaber Summers & Schuster, 1981
- Apalotacarus gracilis Summers & Schuster, 1981
- Apalotacarus luroris Summers & Schuster, 1981
- Apalotacarus paxillus Summers & Schuster, 1981
- Apalotacarus petilus Summers & Schuster, 1981
- Apalotacarus protensus Summers & Schuster, 1981
- Apalotacarus rigescens Summers & Schuster, 1981
- Apalotacarus sajanae Haitlinger, 1990
- Apalotacarus scaurus Summers & Schuster, 1981
- Apalotacarus scissus Summers & Schuster, 1981
- Apalotacarus trullus Summers & Schuster, 1981
